= List of rural localities in Voronezh Oblast =

Map of Russia with Voronezh Oblast highlighted

This is a list of rural localities in Voronezh Oblast. Voronezh Oblast (Russian: Воронежская область, romanized: Voronežskaja oblastj) is a federal subject of Russia (an oblast). Its administrative center is the city of Voronezh. Its population was 2,335,380 as of the 2010 Census.

== Anninsky District ==
Rural localities in Anninsky District:

- Alexandrovka
- Arkhangelskoye
- Artyushkino
- Beryozovka
- Bobyakovo
- Bolshaya Alexeyevka
- Bolshye Yasyrki
- Brodovoye
- Denisovka
- Deryabkino
- Dubrovka
- Gusevka 2nd
- Gusevka
- Khleborodnoye
- Krasny Log
- Krasny
- Kruglovsky
- Levashovka
- Mokhovoye
- Mosolovka
- Nashchyokino
- Nikolayevka
- Nikolskoye
- Novaya Zhizn
- Novonadezhdinsky
- Novy Kurlak
- Ostrovki
- Petrovka
- Posyolok Komsomolskogo otdeleniya sovkhoza Krasnoye Znamya
- Posyolok Oktyabrskogo otdeleniya sovkhoza Pugachyovsky
- Posyolok Pervomayskogo otdeleniya sovkhoza Pugachyovsky
- Posyolok otdeleniya 2-ya Pyatiletka sovkhoza Krasnoye Znamya
- Progress
- Ramonye
- Rubashevka
- Saburovka
- Sadovoye
- Sergeyevka
- Staraya Chigla
- Staraya Toyda
- Stary Kurlak
- Surovsky
- Tsentralnaya Usadba sovkhoza Pugachyovsky
- Vasilyevka
- Verkhnyaya Toyda
- Zagirshchino
- Zhelannoye

== Bobrovsky District ==
Rural localities in Bobrovsky District:

- 2nd Nikolskoe
- Annovka
- Chesmenka
- Duginka
- Karandeyevka
- Khrenishche
- Khrenovoye
- Kopanya
- Korshevo
- Krasny
- Lipovka
- Lushnikovka
- Mechyotka
- Mitrofanovka
- Neskuchny
- Nezhdanovka
- Nikolo-Varvarinka
- Novy Buravl
- Pchelinovka
- Peskovatka
- Petrovo-Borkovsky
- Pogromok
- Razdolny
- Semyono-Alexandrovka
- Shestakovo
- Shestikurganny
- Shishovka
- Shkarin
- Sloboda
- Sokolovsky
- Sukhaya Beryozovka
- Troynya
- Verkhny Ikorets
- Yasenki
- Yudanovka
- Zarechny

== Bogucharsky District ==
Rural localities in Bogucharsky District:

- Batovka
- Belaya Gorka 1-ya
- Dantsevka
- Dubovikovo
- Dubrava
- Dyachenkovo
- Dyadin
- Filonovo
- Galiyevka
- Karazeyevo
- Krasnodar
- Krasnogorovka
- Kravtsovo
- Krinitsa
- Kupyanka
- Lebedinka
- Lipchanka
- Lofitskoye
- Lugovoye
- Medovo
- Monastyrshchina
- Novonikolsk
- Pereshchepnoye
- Plesnovka
- Podkolodnovka
- Poltavka
- Popovka
- Radchenskoye
- Raskovka
- Shurinovka
- Starotolucheyevo
- Sukhoy Donets
- Svoboda
- Tereshkovo
- Travkino
- Tverdokhlebovka
- Varvarovka
- Vervekovka
- Vishnyovy
- Yuzhny
- Zaliman
- Zhuravka

== Buturlinovsky District ==
Rural localities in Buturlinovsky District:

- Chernavka
- Chulok
- Dmitriyevka
- Filippenkovo
- Gvazda
- Karaychevka
- Klyopovka
- Kolodeyevka
- Kozlovka
- Kucheryayevka
- Makogonovo
- Maly Kislyay
- Masychevo
- Otradnoye
- Ozerki
- Patokino
- Piramidy
- Puzevo
- Serikovo
- Tolucheyevo
- Tyunikovo
- Udarnik
- Vasilyevka
- Velikoarkhangelskoye
- Verhnie Ozerki
- Yelizavetino
- Zelyony Gay
- Zelyony

== Ertilsky District ==
Rural localities in Ertilsky District:

- Alexandrovka
- Begichevo
- Bityug-Matryonovka
- Bolshaya Dobrinka
- Bolshoy Samovets
- Borshchyovskiye Peski
- Buravtsovka
- Chapayevskoye
- Dmitriyevka
- Dzerzhinsky
- Gnilusha
- Golevka
- Gorokhovka
- Gryaztsy
- Kolodeyevka
- Komsomolskoye
- Kopyl
- Krasnoarmeysky
- MTF Voskhod
- Malorechensky 2-y
- Malye Yasyrki
- Maryevka
- Michurinsky
- Morozovka
- Nikolsky
- Novogeorgiyevka
- Oktyabrsky
- Pervo-Ertil
- Pervomaysky
- Privolny
- Rostoshi
- Semyonovsky
- Sergeyevka
- Shchuchinskiye Peski
- Shchuchye
- Shuravka
- Slastyonka
- Sosnovka
- Stary Ertil
- Studyonovka
- Vasilyevka
- Veselovka
- Voznesenovka
- Vozrozhdeniye
- Vvedenka
- Vyazkovka
- Yacheyka

== Kalacheyevsky District ==
Rural localities in Kalacheyevsky District:

- Garankin
- Grinyov
- Ilyinka
- Kalacheyevsky
- Manino
- Medvezhye
- Morozov
- Morozovka
- Nikolenkov
- Novaya Kriusha
- Novomelovatka
- Perevolochnoye
- Semyonovka
- Sovetskoye
- Zalesny

== Kamensky District ==
Rural localities in Kamensky District:

- Atamanovka
- Dalneye Stoyanovo
- Degtyarnoye
- Goykalovo
- Ivchenkovo
- Karpenkovo
- Kirichenkovo
- Kozki
- Krutets
- Lyapino
- Marki
- Mikhnovo
- Novikovsky
- Rybalchino
- Timiryazevo
- Verkhniye Marki
- Volchanskoye
- Yevdakovo

== Kantemirovsky District ==
Rural localities in Kantemirovsky District:

- Bondarevo
- Kasyanovka
- Kazimirovka
- Koleshchatovka
- Kolesnikovka
- Kovalenkovsky
- Kulikovka
- Kuznetsovsky
- Mikhaylovka
- Novobelaya
- Pisarevka
- Shevchenkovo
- Volokonovka
- Yevdokiyevka
- Zaytsevka
- Zhuravka

== Kashirsky District ==
Rural localities in Kashirsky District:

- 40 let Oktyabrya
- Biryuchenskoye
- Boyevo
- Dankovo
- Kamenno-Verkhovka
- Karamyshevo
- Kashirskoye
- Kolomenskoye
- Kommuna
- Kondrashkino
- Krugloye
- Levaya Rossosh
- Mosalskoye
- Mozhayskoye
- Posyolok Ilyicha
- Posyolok imeni Dzerzhinskogo
- Verkhneye Maryino
- Zaprudskoye

== Khokholsky District ==
Rural localities in Khokholsky District:

- Arkhangelskoye
- Borshchyovo
- Dmitriyevka
- Gremyachye
- Ivanovka
- Khokhol
- Kochetovka
- Kostyonki
- Nikolskoye-na-Yemanche
- Novogremyachenskoye
- Orlovka
- Oskino
- Pashenkovo
- Petino
- Posyolok Opytnoy Stantsii VNIIK
- Rudkino
- Semidesyatnoye
- Staronikolskoye
- Ustye
- Verkhnenikolskoye
- Yablochnoye
- Yemancha 1-ya

== Liskinsky District ==
Rural localities in Liskinsky District:

- Bodeyevka
- Divnogorye
- Dmitriyevka
- Dobrino
- Drakino
- Fyodorovsky
- Kolomytsevo
- Kolybelka
- Kopanishche
- Kovalyovo
- Liski
- Liskinskoye
- Lugovoy
- Mashkino
- Maslovka
- Melakhino
- Nikolayevka
- Nikolsky
- Nizhnemaryino
- Nizhny Ikorets
- Novozadonsky
- Pochepskoye
- Posyolok sovkhoza 2-ya Pyatiletka
- Priyar
- Shchyuchye
- Sredny Ikorets
- Strelka
- Troitskoye
- Vladimirovka
- Voznesenovka
- Vysokoye
- Yekaterinovka
- Yermolovka
- Zaluzhnoye

== Nizhnedevitsky District ==
Rural localities in Nizhnedevitsky District:

- Andreyevka
- Dmitriyevsky
- Glazovo
- Kuchugury
- Kurbatovo
- Lebyazhye
- Log
- Mikhnyovo
- Nizhnedevitsk
- Nizhnedevitsk
- Nizhneye Turovo
- Novaya Olshanka
- Verkhneye Turovo
- Vyaznovatovka

== Novousmansky District ==
Rural localities in Novousmansky District:

- 1st otdeleniya sovkhoza 'Maslovskiy'
- 1st otdeleniya sovkhoza 'Novousmanskiy'
- 2nd otdeleniya sovkhoza 'Maslovskiy'
- Alexandrovka
- Alfyorovka
- Andreyevka
- Babyakovo
- Beryozovka
- Bolshevik
- Borozdinovsky
- Burlyayevka
- Dimitrovsky
- Dolginka
- Dolinovsky
- Druzhelyubiye
- Gorenskiye Vyselki
- Gorki
- Kamenka-Sadovka
- Karachanovsky
- Kazanskaya Khava
- Khrenovoye
- Krasnoye
- Krylovka
- Lekarstvenny
- Leninsky
- Lepyokhinka
- Makarye
- Maklok
- Mikhaylovka
- Mikhaylovsky
- Moskovsky 2-y
- Nechayevka
- Nekrylovo
- Nekrylovsky
- Nizhnyaya Katukhovka
- Novaya Usman
- Novopokrovsky
- Otradnoye
- Ozyorny
- Parusnoye
- Pionersky
- Podkletnoye
- Polovtsevo
- Pykhovka
- Rozhdestvenskaya Khava
- Rusanovo
- Sadovy
- Shevlyaginsky
- Shuberskoye
- Sokolovsky
- Studyony
- Timiryazevo
- Trudolyubovka
- Trudovoye
- Ushanovka
- Varvarino
- Volya
- Yarki
- Zamelnichny

== Olkhovatsky District ==
Rural localities in Olkhovatsky District:

- Adrianovka
- Bolshiye Bazy
- Bugayevka
- Drozdovo
- Gvozdovka
- Karayashnik
- Kilishovka
- Kolesnikovo
- Kopanaya 1-ya
- Kopanaya 2-ya
- Kostovo
- Kravtsovka
- Kryukov
- Limarev
- Malye Bazy
- Marchenkovka
- Maryevka
- Nazarovka
- Nerovnovka
- Novaya Sotnya
- Novodmitriyevka
- Novokarayashnik
- Novokharkovka
- Novokulishovka
- Pervomayskoye
- Peschany
- Politotdelskoye
- Postoyaly
- Posyolok imeni Lenina
- Rakovka
- Remezovo
- Rodina Geroya
- Rybny
- Salovka
- Vysoky
- Yurasovka
- Zabolotovka
- Zagiryanka

== Ostrogozhsky District ==
Rural localities in Ostrogozhsky District:

- Alexandrovka
- Beryozovo
- Blizhneye Stoyanovo
- Blizhnyaya Polubyanka
- Boldyrevka
- Buzenki
- Dalnyaya Polubyanka
- Devitsa
- Dolzhik
- Dubovoy
- Elevatorny
- Gniloye
- Grushevaya Polyana
- Khokhol-Trostyanka
- Kolovatovka
- Korotoyak
- Krivaya Polyana
- Luki
- Mastyugino
- Nizhny Olshan
- Novaya Melnitsa
- Novaya Osinovka
- Novo-Uspenka
- Palenin
- Peski-Kharkovskiye
- Petrenkovo
- Petropavlovka
- Pokrovka
- Rastykaylovka
- Russkaya Trostyanka
- Rybnoye
- Shinkin
- Shubnoye
- Sibirsky
- Soldatskoye
- Sredne-Voskresenskoye
- Storozhevoye 1-ye
- Ternovoye
- Trud
- Uryv-Pokrovka
- Uspenskoye
- Veretye
- Verkhny Olshan
- Vladimirovka
- Voloshino
- Yablochny
- Yezdochnoye
- Zasosna
- Zavershye

== Paninsky District ==
Rural localities in Paninsky District:

- Alexandrovka
- Aloye Pole
- Bogoroditskoye
- Bolshiye Yasyrki
- Bolshoye Martyn
- Borshchyovo
- Chernavka
- Dmitriyevka
- Georgiyevka
- Ivanovka 1-ya
- Ivanovka
- Kalininsky
- Kalmychyok
- Kazinovka
- Khitrovka
- Kirovskoye
- Krasnoye
- Krasny Liman
- Krasny Liman 2-y
- Krasnye Kholmy
- Kriusha
- Maryevka
- Maysky
- Michurinsky
- Mikhaylovka 1-ya
- Mikhaylovka 2-ya
- Mikhaylovsky
- Mirovka
- Nikolskoye 1-ye
- Nikolskoye
- Novoalexandrovka
- Novokhrenovoye
- Oktyabrsky
- Otrada
- Pady
- Partizan
- Perelyoshino
- Pervomaysky
- Petrovskoye
- Rostashevka
- Sergeyevka
- Shcherbachyovka
- Sofyinka
- Tarasovka
- Timiryazevsky
- Toyda
- Toyda 1-ya
- Toyda 2-ya
- Toydensky
- Usmanskiye Vyselki
- Verkhnyaya Katukhovka

== Petropavlovsky District ==
Rural localities in Petropavlovsky District:

- Bereznyagi
- Bychok
- Chervono-Chekhursky
- Dedovka
- Dedovochka
- Fomenkovo
- Glubokoye
- Indychy
- Kotovka
- Krasnoflotskoye
- Krasnosyolovka
- Novobogoroditskoye
- Novotroitskoye
- Novy Liman
- Ogarev
- Peski
- Petropavlovka
- Posyolok sovkhoza Trud
- Progoreloye
- Staraya Kriusha
- Staraya Melovaya
- Zamostye

== Povorinsky District ==
Rural localities in Povorinsky District:

- Andreyevka
- Baychurovo
- Belogorye
- Beryozovo
- Bolshaya Dmitrovka
- Bolshaya Khvoshchevatka
- Bolshoy Skororyb
- Dankovsky
- Dolzhik
- Galsky
- Goncharovka
- Grishevka
- Ilmen
- Kamenka
- Kardailovka
- Kolodezhnoye
- Korenshchina
- Kosharnoye
- Kostomarovo
- Kostyukovka
- Krasny Voskhod
- Krasyukovsky
- Kuleshovka
- Kurennoye
- Lugovoy
- Lykovo
- Malaya Sudyovka
- Mazurka
- Mokhovoye
- Morozovka
- Nikolsky
- Okrayushkin
- Oktyabrskoye
- Oktyabrsky
- Opyt
- Perevalnoye
- Peski
- Petropavlovka
- Pobedinshchina
- Podgornoye
- Pogorelovka
- Pokrovka
- Probuzhdeniye
- Rozhdestvenskoye
- Saguny
- Saguny
- Samodurovka
- Samoylenko
- Saprino
- Semeyka
- Sergeyevka
- Serpanki
- Stepanovka
- Sud-Nikolayevka
- Sukhaya Rossosh
- Ternovoye
- Varvarovka
- Verkhny Karabut
- Vikhlyayevka
- Vitebsk
- Yudino

== Ramonsky District ==
Rural localities in Ramonsky District:

- Aydarovo
- Beryozovo
- Bogdanovo
- Bolshaya Treshchevka
- Bolshaya Vereyka
- Chertovitsy
- Chistaya Polyana
- Glushitsy
- Gorozhanka
- Gremyachye
- Gvozdyovka
- Ivnitsy
- Karachun
- Khvoshchevatka
- Knyazevo
- Komsomolsky
- Krasnoye
- Krivoborye
- Lebyazhye
- Lomovo
- Lopatki
- Medovka
- Mokhovatka
- Nelzha
- Nizhnyaya Vereyka
- Novopodkletnoye
- Novozhivotinnoye
- Olkhovatka
- Pchelniki
- Petrovskoye
- Russkaya Gvozdyovka
- Sennoye
- Sergeyevskoye
- Sklyayevo
- Solntse-Dubrava
- Somovo
- Starozhivotinnoye
- Stupino
- Treshchevka
- VNIISS
- Yamnoye

== Repyovsky District ==
Rural localities in Repyovsky District:

- Butyrki
- Drakino
- Fabritskoye
- Kolbino
- Korneyevka
- Krasnolipye
- Krestyansky
- Novosoldatka
- Odintsovka
- Platava
- Prilepy
- Priluzhny
- Repyovka
- Rossosh
- Rossoshki
- Sasovka 1-ya
- Sasovka 2-ya
- Serdyuki
- Skoritskoye
- Ust-Muravlyanka

== Rossoshansky District ==
Rural localities in Rossoshansky District:

- Alexandrovka
- Aleynikovo
- Antselovich
- Arkhangelsk
- Arkhipovka
- Artyomovo
- Atamanovka
- Chagari
- Chernyshovka
- Golubaya Krinitsa
- Grigoryevka
- Ivanovka
- Khersonsky
- Kokarevka
- Kolbinka
- Komarovo
- Kopanki
- Kopyonkina
- Krinichnoye
- Krivonosovo
- Kulakovka
- Lebed-Sergeyevka
- Lizinovka
- Loshchina
- Malaya Mezhenka
- Molodyozhny
- Morozovka
- Nachalo
- Nagornoye
- Nikonorovka
- Nizhny Karabut
- Novaya Kalitva
- Novopostoyalovka
- Novosyolovka
- Opytnoy plodovo-yagodnoy stantsii
- Pereshchepnoye
- Pervomayskoye
- Poddubnoye
- Podgornoye
- Popovka
- Posyolok sovkhoza Rossoshansky
- Raynovskoye
- Shekalovka
- Shramovka
- Slavyanka
- Staraya Kalitva
- Stefanidovka
- Stetsenkovo
- Ternovka
- Tsapkovo
- Ukrainsky
- Verkhny Kiev
- Voroshilovsky
- Yekaterinovka
- Yelenovka
- Yevstratovka

== Semiluksky District ==
Rural localities in Semiluksky District:

- Bystrik
- Dalneye Lyapino
- Devitsa
- Dolgo-Makhovatka
- Gnilusha
- Golovishche
- Goslesopitomnika
- Gubaryovo
- Izbishche
- Kamenka
- Kaverye
- Kondrashyovka
- Losevo
- Malaya Pokrovka
- Malaya Vereyka
- Melovatka
- Nizhnyaya Veduga
- Novosilskoye
- Perlyovka
- Posyolok sovkhoza Razdolye
- Privolye
- Razdolye
- Semiluki
- Serebryanka
- Stadnitsa
- Staraya Olshanka
- Staraya Veduga
- Ternovoye
- Voznesenka
- Yendovishche
- Zatsepnoye
- Zemlyansk

== Talovsky District ==
Rural localities in Talovsky District:

- Abramovka
- Abramovka
- Alexandrovka
- Anokhinka
- Biryuch
- Dokuchayevsky
- Ilyinka
- Kazanka
- Khleborob
- Khorolsky
- Komintern
- Komsomolsky
- Kozlovsky
- Krasny
- Kupalny
- Leningradsky
- Manidinsky
- Mikhinsky
- Nikolskoye
- Nizhnyaya Kamenka
- Novaya Chigla
- Novenky
- Novitchenko
- Novogolsky 2-y
- Novogradsky
- Novonikolsky
- Novotroitsky
- Novy mir
- Orlovka
- Osinki
- Pervomaysky
- Porokhovo
- Posyolok 1-go uchastka instituta imeni Dokuchayeva
- Posyolok 2-go uchastka instituta imeni Dokuchayeva
- Posyolok 3-go uchastka instituta imeni Dokuchayeva
- Sergiyevsky
- Sinyavka
- Solontsovka
- Terekhovo
- Troitsky
- Tsentralny
- Uchastok №12
- Uchastok №26
- Uchastok №28
- Uchastok №4
- Uspensky
- Utinovka
- Vasilyevsky
- Verkhneozyorsky
- Veryovkin 1-y
- Veryovkin 2-y
- Vidny
- Voznesenovka
- Voznesensky
- Vyazovka
- Vysoky
- Zarechensky
- Znamenka

== Ternovsky District ==
Rural localities in Ternovsky District:

- Aleshki
- Alexandrovka
- Babino
- Bratki
- Chubrovka
- Dolina
- Dubrovka
- Kiselnoye
- Korshunovka
- Kostino-Otdelets
- Lipyagi
- Lunacharovka
- Narodnoye
- Nikitskaya
- Nikolayevka
- Novokirsanovka
- Novotroitskoye
- Orlovka
- Platonovka
- Polyana
- Popovka
- Rusanovo
- Rzhavets
- Savalskogo lesnichestva
- Semigorovka
- Sergeyevka
- Tambovka
- Ternovka
- Yesipovo
- Zarechye

== Verkhnekhavsky District ==
Rural localities in Verkhnekhavsky District:

- Abramovka
- Alexandrovka
- Andreyevka 1-ya
- Belovka
- Bogoslovka
- Bolshaya Privalovka
- Dmitro-Pokrovskoye
- Grushino
- Malaya Privalovka
- Malinovka
- Maly Samovets
- Mitrofanovka
- NIIOKH
- Nikolskoye
- Nikonovo
- Nizhnyaya Baygora
- Nizhnyaya Maza
- Parizhskaya Kommuna
- Perovka
- Plyasovatka
- Podlesny
- Pokrovka
- Pravaya Khava
- Semyonovka
- Shukayevka
- Sukhiye Gai
- Talovaya
- Uglyanets
- Vasilyevka 1-ya
- Verkhnyaya Baygora
- Verkhnyaya Khava
- Verkhnyaya Lugovatka
- Verkhnyaya Maza
- Verkhnyaya Plavitsa
- Vishnevka
- Volya
- Zheldayevka

== Verkhnemamonsky District ==
Rural localities in Verkhnemamonsky District:

- Derezovka
- Gorokhovka
- Lozovoye
- Mamonovka
- Nizhny Mamon
- Olkhovatka
- Orobinsky
- Osetrovka
- Prirechoye
- Russkaya Zhuravka
- Verkhny Mamon

== Vorobyovsky District ==
Rural localities in Vorobyovsky District:

- Alexeyevka
- Bannoye
- Beryozovka
- Bolshiye Alabukhi
- Dmitriyevka
- Goryushkin
- Grinyov
- Kalinovo
- Kamenka
- Kirsanovka
- Krasnopolye
- Krasnorechenka
- Krasovka
- Kutki
- Kvashino
- Lavrovka
- Leshchanoye
- Listopadovka
- Malaya Gribanovka
- Malye Alabukhi 1-ye
- Malye Alabukhi 2-ye
- Mirny
- Muzhichye
- Nagolny
- Nikolskoye 1-ye
- Nikolskoye 2-ye
- Nizhny Byk
- Nizhny Karachan
- Novogolskoye
- Novogolyelan
- Novotolucheyevo
- Pervomaysky
- Posyolok sovkhoza Pavlovka
- Solontsy
- Sredny Karachan
- Vasilyevka
- Verkhnetolucheyevo
- Verkhny Byk
- Verkhny Karachan
- Vlasovka
- Vorobyovka
- Vysokoye
- Yelizavetovka
- Zaton

== See also ==
- Lists of rural localities in Russia
