= Yezdochnoye =

Yezdochnoye Ездочное
- Selo
- Location within Voronezh Oblast Location within Russia
- Coordinates: 51°01′N 38°58′E
- Country: Russia
- Region: Voronezh Oblast
- District: Ostrogozhsky District
- Time zone: UTC+3:00

Yezdochnoye (Russian: Ездочное) is a rural locality (a selo) in Ternovskoye Rural Settlement, Ostrogozhsky District, Voronezh Oblast, Russia. The population was 164 as of 2010. There are 2 streets.

== Geography ==
Yezdochnoye is located 23 km northwest of Ostrogozhsk (the district's administrative centre) by road. Soldatskoye is the nearest rural locality.
