= Chernyshovka =

Chernyshovka Чернышовка
- Khutor
- Location within Voronezh Oblast Location within Russia
- Coordinates: 50°08′N 39°32′E
- Country: Russia
- Region: Voronezh Oblast
- District: Rossoshansky District
- Time zone: UTC+3:00

Chernyshovka (Russian: Чернышовка) is a rural locality (a khutor) in Lizinovskoye Rural Settlement, Rossoshansky District, Voronezh Oblast, Russia. The population was 212 as of 2010.

== Geography ==
Chernyshovka is located 11 km southwest of Rossosh (the district's administrative centre) by road. Artyomovo is the nearest rural locality.
