= Verkhnyaya Maza =

Verkhnyaya Maza Верхняя Маза
- Settlement
- Location within Voronezh Oblast Location within Russia
- Coordinates: 51°48′N 40°08′E
- Country: Russia
- Region: Voronezh Oblast
- District: Verkhnekhavsky District
- Time zone: UTC+3:00

Verkhnyaya Maza (Russian: Верхняя Маза) is a rural locality (a settlement) and the administrative center of Verkhnemazovskoye Rural Settlement, Verkhnekhavsky District, Voronezh Oblast, Russia. The population was 448 as of 2010. There are 6 streets.

== Geography ==
Verkhnyaya Maza is located 24 km east of Verkhnyaya Khava (the district's administrative centre) by road. Fominichi is the nearest rural locality.
