= Sklyayevo =

Sklyayevo Скляево
- Selo
- Location within Voronezh Oblast Location within Russia
- Coordinates: 51°57′N 39°02′E
- Country: Russia
- Region: Voronezh Oblast
- District: Ramonsky District
- Time zone: UTC+3:00

Sklyayevo (Russian: Скляево) is a rural locality (a selo) and the administrative center of Sklyayevskoye Rural Settlement, Ramonsky District, Voronezh Oblast, Russia. The population was 547 as of 2010. There are 5 streets.

== Geography ==
Sklyayevo is located 29 km northwest of Ramon (the district's administrative centre) by road. Nizhnyaya Vereyka is the nearest rural locality.
