= Pisarevka =

Pisarevka Писаревка
- Selo
- Location within Voronezh Oblast Location within Russia
- Coordinates: 49°53′N 40°10′E
- Country: Russia
- Region: Voronezh Oblast
- District: Kantemirovsky District
- Time zone: UTC+3:00

Pisarevka (Russian: Писаревка) is a rural locality (a selo) and the administrative center of Pisarevskoye Rural Settlement, Kantemirovsky District, Voronezh Oblast, Russia. The population was 1,658 as of 2010. There are 15 streets.

== Geography ==
Pisarevka is located 35 km northeast of Kantemirovka (the district's administrative centre) by road. Taly is the nearest rural locality.
