= Starotolucheyevo =

Starotolucheyevo Старотолучеево
- Selo
- Location within Voronezh Oblast Location within Russia
- Coordinates: 49°58′N 40°45′E
- Country: Russia
- Region: Voronezh Oblast
- District: Bogucharsky District
- Time zone: UTC+3:00

Starotolucheyevo (Russian: Старотолучеево) is a rural locality (a selo) in Podkolodnovskoye Rural Settlement, Bogucharsky District, Voronezh Oblast, Russia. The population was 375 as of 2010. There are 10 streets.

== Geography ==
Starotolucheyevo is located on the Tolucheyevka River, 20 km northeast of Boguchar (the district's administrative centre) by road. Podkolodnovka is the nearest rural locality.
