= Morozovka, Rossoshansky District, Voronezh Oblast =

Morozovka Морозовка
- Selo
- Location within Voronezh Oblast Location within Russia
- Coordinates: 50°08′N 39°38′E
- Country: Russia
- Region: Voronezh Oblast
- District: Rossoshansky District
- Time zone: UTC+3:00

Morozovka (Russian: Морозовка) is a rural locality (a selo) and the administrative center of Morozovskoye Rural Settlement, Rossoshansky District, Voronezh Oblast, Russia. The population was 1,239 as of 2010. There are 18 streets.

== Geography ==
Morozovka is located 19 km southeast of Rossosh (the district's administrative centre) by road. Rossosh is the nearest rural locality.
