= Novaya Melnitsa =

Novaya Melnitsa Новая Мельница
- Selo
- Location within Voronezh Oblast Location within Russia
- Coordinates: 50°48′N 39°01′E
- Country: Russia
- Region: Voronezh Oblast
- District: Ostrogozhsky District
- Time zone: UTC+3:00

Novaya Melnitsa (Russian: Новая Мельница) is a rural locality (a selo) in Ostrogozhsk, Ostrogozhsky District, Voronezh Oblast, Russia. The population was 316 as of 2010. There are 8 streets.

== Geography ==
Novaya Melnitsa is located 12 km southwest of Ostrogozhsk (the district's administrative centre) by road. Gniloye is the nearest rural locality.
