= Kalinovo, Gribanovsky District, Voronezh Oblast =

Kalinovo Калиново
- Selo
- Location within Voronezh Oblast Location within Russia
- Coordinates: 51°25′N 41°35′E
- Country: Russia
- Region: Voronezh Oblast
- District: Gribanovsky District
- Time zone: UTC+3:00

Kalinovo (Russian: Кали́ново) is a rural locality (a selo) and the administrative center of Kalinovskoye Rural Settlement, Gribanovsky District, Voronezh Oblast, Russia. The population was 139 as of 2010. There are 5 streets.

== Geography ==
Kalinovo is located 32 km west of Gribanovsky (the district's administrative centre) by road. Dmitriyevka is the nearest rural locality.
