= Malaya Gribanovka =

Malaya Gribanovka Малая Грибановка
- Selo
- Location within Voronezh Oblast Location within Russia
- Coordinates: 51°30′N 42°04′E
- Country: Russia
- Region: Voronezh Oblast
- District: Gribanovsky District
- Time zone: UTC+3:00

Malaya Gribanovka (Russian: Ма́лая Гриба́новка) is a rural locality (a selo) and the administrative center of Malogribanovskoye Rural Settlement, Gribanovsky District, Voronezh Oblast, Russia. The population was 728 as of 2010. There are 24 streets.

== Geography ==
Malaya Gribanovka is located 12 km northeast of Gribanovsky (the district's administrative centre) by road. Mayak is the nearest rural locality.
