= Zamelnichny =

Zamelnichny Замельничный
- Khutor
- Location within Voronezh Oblast Location within Russia
- Coordinates: 51°06′N 41°39′E
- Country: Russia
- Region: Voronezh Oblast
- District: Novokhopyorsky District
- Time zone: UTC+3:00

Zamelnichny (Russian: Заме́льничный) is a rural locality (a khutor) in Novokhopyorsk, Novokhopyorsky District, Voronezh Oblast, Russia. The population was 328 as of 2010. There are 8 streets.

== Geography ==
Zamelnichny is located 4 km northeast of Novokhopyorsk (the district's administrative centre) by road. Novokhopyorsk is the nearest rural locality.
