= Verkhnyaya Lugovatka =

Verkhnyaya Lugovatka Верхняя Луговатка
- Selo
- Location within Voronezh Oblast Location within Russia
- Coordinates: 51°57′N 40°05′E
- Country: Russia
- Region: Voronezh Oblast
- District: Verkhnekhavsky District
- Time zone: UTC+3:00

Verkhnyaya Lugovatka (Russian: Верхняя Луговатка) is a rural locality (a selo) and the administrative center of Verkhnelugovatskoye Rural Settlement, Verkhnekhavsky District, Voronezh Oblast, Russia. The population was 576 as of 2010. There are 7 streets.

== Geography ==
Verkhnyaya Lugovatka is located 19 km northeast of Verkhnyaya Khava (the district's administrative centre) by road. Priozernoye is the nearest rural locality.
