= Novokarayashnik =

Novokarayashnik Новокараяшник
- Sloboda
- Location within Voronezh Oblast Location within Russia
- Coordinates: 50°23′N 39°14′E
- Country: Russia
- Region: Voronezh Oblast
- District: Olkhovatsky District
- Time zone: UTC+3:00

Novokarayashnik (Russian: Новокараяшник) is a rural locality (a sloboda) in Karayashnikovskoye Rural Settlement, Olkhovatsky District, Voronezh Oblast, Russia. The population was 201 as of 2010. There are 2 streets.
