= Kopyonkina =

Kopyonkina Копёнкина
- Settlement
- Location within Voronezh Oblast Location within Russia
- Coordinates: 50°03′N 39°33′E
- Country: Russia
- Region: Voronezh Oblast
- District: Rossoshansky District
- Time zone: UTC+3:00

Kopyonkina (Russian: Копёнкина) is a rural locality (a settlement) and the administrative center of Kopenkinskoye Rural Settlement, Rossoshansky District, Voronezh Oblast, Russia. The population was 601 as of 2010. There are 9 streets.

== Geography ==
Kopyonkina is located 24 km south of Rossosh (the district's administrative centre) by road. Voroshilovsky is the nearest rural locality.
