= Toydensky =

Toydensky Тойденский
- Settlement
- Location within Voronezh Oblast Location within Russia
- Coordinates: 51°32′N 40°06′E
- Country: Russia
- Region: Voronezh Oblast
- District: Paninsky District
- Time zone: UTC+3:00

Toydensky (Russian: Тойденский) is a rural locality (a settlement) in Oktyabrskoye Rural Settlement, Paninsky District, Voronezh Oblast, Russia. The population was 166 as of 2010. There are 3 streets.

== Geography ==
Toydensky is located 20 km south of Panino (the district's administrative centre) by road. Oktyabrsky is the nearest rural locality.
