= Orlovka, Khokholsky District, Voronezh Oblast =

Orlovka Орловка
- Settlement
- Location within Voronezh Oblast Location within Russia
- Coordinates: 51°36′N 38°59′E
- Country: Russia
- Region: Voronezh Oblast
- District: Khokholsky District
- Time zone: UTC+3:00

Orlovka (Russian: Орловка) is a rural locality (a settlement) in Petinskoye Rural Settlement, Khokholsky District, Voronezh Oblast, Russia. The population was 969 as of 2010. There are 7 streets.

== Geography ==
Orlovka is located on the right bank of the Don River, 27 km northeast of Khokholsky (the district's administrative centre) by road. Petino is the nearest rural locality.
