= Zagiryanka =

Zagiryanka Загирянка
- Settlement
- Location within Voronezh Oblast Location within Russia
- Coordinates: 50°16′N 39°15′E
- Country: Russia
- Region: Voronezh Oblast
- District: Olkhovatsky District
- Time zone: UTC+3:00

Zagiryanka (Russian: Загирянка) is a rural locality (a settlement) in Olkhovatskoye Urban Settlement, Olkhovatsky District, Voronezh Oblast, Russia. The population was 250 as of 2010. There are 3 streets.

== Geography ==
Zagiryanka is located 4 km west of Olkhovatka (the district's administrative centre) by road. Olkhovatka is the nearest rural locality.
