= Malaya Privalovka =

Malaya Privalovka Малая Приваловка
- Selo
- Location within Voronezh Oblast Location within Russia
- Coordinates: 51°51′N 39°40′E
- Country: Russia
- Region: Voronezh Oblast
- District: Verkhnekhavsky District
- Time zone: UTC+3:00

Malaya Privalovka (Russian: Малая Приваловка) is a rural locality (a selo) and the administrative center of Maloprivalovskoye Rural Settlement, Verkhnekhavsky District, Voronezh Oblast, Russia. The population was 435 as of 2010. There are 9 streets.

== Geography ==
Malaya Privalovka is located 20 km west of Verkhnyaya Khava (the district's administrative centre) by road. Zheldayevka is the nearest rural locality.
