= Marchenkovka =

Marchenkovka Марченковка
- Selo
- Location within Voronezh Oblast Location within Russia
- Coordinates: 50°16′N 39°13′E
- Country: Russia
- Region: Voronezh Oblast
- District: Olkhovatsky District
- Time zone: UTC+3:00

Marchenkovka (Russian: Марченковка) is a rural locality (a selo) in Maryevskoye Rural Settlement, Olkhovatsky District, Voronezh Oblast, Russia. The population was 638 as of 2010. There are 5 streets.

== Geography ==
Marchenkovka is located 8 km west of Olkhovatka (the district's administrative centre) by road. Zagiryanka is the nearest rural locality.
