= Kaverye =

Kaverye Каверье
- Selo
- Location within Voronezh Oblast Location within Russia
- Coordinates: 51°54′N 39°01′E
- Country: Russia
- Region: Voronezh Oblast
- District: Semiluksky District
- Time zone: UTC+3:00

Kaverye (Russian: Каверье) is a rural locality (a selo) in Medvezhenskoye Rural Settlement, Semiluksky District, Voronezh Oblast, Russia. The population was 134 as of 2010. There are 3 streets.

== Geography ==
Kaverye is located 28 km north of Semiluki (the district's administrative centre) by road. Treshchevka is the nearest rural locality.
