= Moskovsky 2-y =

Moskovsky 2-y Московский 2-й
- Settlement
- Location within Voronezh Oblast Location within Russia
- Coordinates: 51°17′N 41°13′E
- Country: Russia
- Region: Voronezh Oblast
- District: Novokhopyorsky District
- Time zone: UTC+3:00

Moskovsky 2-y (Russian: Моско́вский 2-й) is a rural locality (a settlement) in Novopokrovskoye Rural Settlement, Novokhopyorsky District, Voronezh Oblast, Russia. The population was 58 as of 2010. There are 2 streets.

== Geography ==
Moskovsky 2-y is located 47 km northwest of Novokhopyorsk (the district's administrative centre) by road. Leninsky is the nearest rural locality.
