= Dankovo =

Dankovo Данково
- Selo
- Location within Voronezh Oblast Location within Russia
- Coordinates: 51°17′N 39°31′E
- Country: Russia
- Region: Voronezh Oblast
- District: Kashirsky District
- Time zone: UTC+3:00

Dankovo (Russian: Данково) is a rural locality (a selo) and the administrative center of Dankovskoye Rural Settlement, Kashirsky District, Voronezh Oblast, Russia. The population was 1,226 as of 2010. There are 14 streets.

== Geography ==
Dankovo is located 18 km southwest of Kashirskoye (the district's administrative centre) by road. Starina is the nearest rural locality.
