= Nelzha =

Nelzha Нелжа
- Selo
- Location within Voronezh Oblast Location within Russia
- Coordinates: 52°02′N 39°23′E
- Country: Russia
- Region: Voronezh Oblast
- District: Ramonsky District
- Time zone: UTC+3:00

Nelzha (Russian: Нелжа) is a rural locality (a selo) in Stupinskoye Rural Settlement, Ramonsky District, Voronezh Oblast, Russia. The population was 284 as of 2010. There are 12 streets.

== Geography ==
Nelzha is located 20 km north of Ramon (the district's administrative centre) by road. SNT 'Vitta' is the nearest rural locality.
