= Khleborodnoye =

Khleborodnoye Хлебородное
- Selo
- Location within Voronezh Oblast Location within Russia
- Coordinates: 51°27′N 40°41′E
- Country: Russia
- Region: Voronezh Oblast
- District: Anninsky District
- Time zone: UTC+3:00

Khleborodnoye (Russian: Хлебородное) is a rural locality (a selo) and the administrative center of Khleborodnenskoye Rural Settlement, Anninsky District, Voronezh Oblast, Russia. The population was 608 as of 2010. There are 7 streets.

== Geography ==
Khleborodnoye is located on the Kurlak River, 20 km east of Anna (the district's administrative centre) by road. Mokhovoye is the nearest rural locality.
