= Dokuchayevsky =

Dokuchayevsky Докучаевский
- Settlement
- Location within Voronezh Oblast Location within Russia
- Coordinates: 51°03′N 40°39′E
- Country: Russia
- Region: Voronezh Oblast
- District: Talovsky District
- Time zone: UTC+3:00

Dokuchayevsky (Russian: Докучаевский) is a rural locality (a settlement) in Voznesenskoye Rural Settlement, Talovsky District, Voronezh Oblast, Russia. The population was 342 as of 2010. There are 2 streets.
