= Mikhaylovka 2-ya =

Mikhaylovka 2-ya Михайловка 2-я
- Selo
- Location within Voronezh Oblast Location within Russia
- Coordinates: 51°44′N 39°59′E
- Country: Russia
- Region: Voronezh Oblast
- District: Paninsky District
- Time zone: UTC+3:00

Mikhaylovka 2-ya (Russian: Михайловка 2-я) is a selo in Dmitriyevskoye Rural Settlement, Paninsky District, Voronezh Oblast, Russia. The population is 162 as of 2010. There are five streets.

== Geography ==
Mikhaylovka 2-ya is located on the Rtishchevo River, 26 km northwest of Panino (the district's administrative centre) by road. Nikolskoye 1-ye is the nearest rural locality.
