= Krasny Log =

Krasny Log Красный Лог
- Settlement
- Location within Voronezh Oblast Location within Russia
- Coordinates: 51°31′N 41°04′E
- Country: Russia
- Region: Voronezh Oblast
- District: Anninsky District
- Time zone: UTC+3:00

Krasny Log (Russian: Красный Лог) is a rural locality (a settlement) and the administrative center of Krasnologskoye Rural Settlement, Anninsky District, Voronezh Oblast, Russia. The population was 242 as of 2010. There are 5 streets.

== Geography ==
Krasny Log is located 60 km east of Anna (the district's administrative centre) by road. Krasny is the nearest rural locality.
