= Shurinovka =

Shurinovka Шуриновка
- Selo
- Location within Voronezh Oblast Location within Russia
- Coordinates: 49°44′N 40°23′E
- Country: Russia
- Region: Voronezh Oblast
- District: Bogucharsky District
- Time zone: UTC+3:00

Shurinovka (Russian: Шуриновка) is a rural locality (a selo) in Lipchanskoye Rural Settlement, Bogucharsky District, Voronezh Oblast, Russia. The population was 383 as of 2010. There are 3 streets.

== Geography ==
Shurinovka is located on the Levaya Bogucharka River, 31 km southwest of Boguchar (the district's administrative centre) by road. Varvarovka is the nearest rural locality.
