= Khvoshchevatka =

Khvoshchevatka Хвощеватка
- Selo
- Location within Voronezh Oblast Location within Russia
- Coordinates: 51°52′N 39°07′E
- Country: Russia
- Region: Voronezh Oblast
- District: Ramonsky District
- Time zone: UTC+3:00

Khvoshchevatka (Russian: Хвощеватка) is a rural locality (a selo) in Novozhivotinnovskoye Rural Settlement, Ramonsky District, Voronezh Oblast, Russia. The population was 216 as of 2010. There are 29 streets.

== Geography ==
Khvoshchevatka is located on the right bank of the Don River, 22 km southwest of Ramon (the district's administrative centre) by road. Novozhivotinnoye is the nearest rural locality.
