= Novikovsky =

Khutor in Voronezh Oblast, Russia

Novikovsky Новиковский
- Khutor
- Show map of Voronezh Oblast. Show map of Russia. Novikovsky (Russia)
- Coordinates: 50°41′N 39°35′E
- Country: Russia
- Region: Voronezh Oblast
- District: Kamensky District
- Rural settlement: Sonchinskoye Rural Settlement
- Time zone: MSK (UTC+3)

Novikovsky (Russian: Новиковский) is a rural locality (a khutor) in Sonchinskoye Rural Settlement, Kamensky District, Voronezh Oblast, Russia. The population was 251 as of 2010. There are 5 streets.

== Geography ==
Novikovsky is located 15 km east of Kamenka (the district's administrative centre) by road. Ivchenkovo is the nearest rural locality.
