= Stefanidovka, Voronezh Oblast =

Stefanidovka Стефанидовка
- Khutor
- Location within Voronezh Oblast Location within Russia
- Coordinates: 50°17′N 39°28′E
- Country: Russia
- Region: Voronezh Oblast
- District: Rossoshansky District
- Time zone: UTC+3:00

Stefanidovka (Russian: Стефанидовка) is a rural locality (a khutor) in Novopostoyalovskoye Rural Settlement, Rossoshansky District, Voronezh Oblast, Russia. The population was 52 as of 2010.

== Geography ==
Stefanidovka is located 17 km northwest of Rossosh (the district's administrative centre) by road. Drozdovo is the nearest rural locality.
