= Krestyansky =

Krestyansky Крестьянский
- Khutor
- Location within Voronezh Oblast Location within Russia
- Coordinates: 51°04′N 38°33′E
- Country: Russia
- Region: Voronezh Oblast
- District: Repyovsky District
- Time zone: UTC+3:00

Krestyansky (Russian: Крестьянский) is a rural locality (a khutor) in Butyrskoye Rural Settlement, Repyovsky District, Voronezh Oblast, Russia. The population was 54 as of 2010.

== Geography ==
Krestyansky is located 6 km west of Repyovka (the district's administrative centre) by road. Korneyevka is the nearest rural locality.
