= Malaya Mezhenka =

Malaya Mezhenka Малая Меженка
- Khutor
- Location within Voronezh Oblast Location within Russia
- Coordinates: 50°07′N 39°45′E
- Country: Russia
- Region: Voronezh Oblast
- District: Rossoshansky District
- Time zone: UTC+3:00

Malaya Mezhenka (Russian: Малая Меженка) is a rural locality (a khutor) in Yevstratovskoye Rural Settlement, Rossoshansky District, Voronezh Oblast, Russia. The population was 211 as of 2010.

== Geography ==
Malaya Mezhenka is located 19 km southeast of Rossosh (the district's administrative centre) by road. Yevstratovka is the nearest rural locality.
