= Novodmitriyevka =

Novodmitriyevka Новодмитриевка
- Khutor
- Location within Voronezh Oblast Location within Russia
- Coordinates: 50°21′N 39°04′E
- Country: Russia
- Region: Voronezh Oblast
- District: Olkhovatsky District
- Time zone: UTC+3:00

Novodmitriyevka (Russian: Новодмитриевка) is a rural locality (a khutor) in Maryevskoye Rural Settlement, Olkhovatsky District, Voronezh Oblast, Russia. The population was 91 as of 2010.

== Geography ==
Novodmitriyevka is located 24 km northwest of Olkhovatka (the district's administrative centre) by road. Limarev is the nearest rural locality.
