= Pervomayskoye, Olkhovatsky District, Voronezh Oblast =

Pervomayskoye Первомайское
- Settlement
- Location within Voronezh Oblast Location within Russia
- Coordinates: 50°21′N 39°23′E
- Country: Russia
- Region: Voronezh Oblast
- District: Olkhovatsky District
- Time zone: UTC+3:00

Pervomayskoye (Russian: Первомайское) is a rural locality (a settlement) in Lisichanskoye Rural Settlement, Olkhovatsky District, Voronezh Oblast, Russia. The population was 109 as of 2010. There are 3 streets.

== Geography ==
Pervomayskoye is located 36 km southwest of Olkhovatka (the district's administrative centre) by road. Atamanovka is the nearest rural locality.
