= Artyushkino =

Artyushkino Артюшкино
- Selo
- Location within Voronezh Oblast Location within Russia
- Coordinates: 51°20′N 40°57′E
- Country: Russia
- Region: Voronezh Oblast
- District: Anninsky District
- Time zone: UTC+3:00

Artyushkino (Russian: Артюшкино) is a rural locality (a selo) and the administrative center of Artyushkinskoye Rural Settlement, Anninsky District, Voronezh Oblast, Russia. The population was 500 as of 2018. There are 13 streets.

== Geography ==
Artyushkino is located 50 km southeast of Anna (the district's administrative centre) by road. Vyazovka is the nearest rural locality.
