= Staraya Toyda =

Staraya Toyda Старая Тойда
- Selo
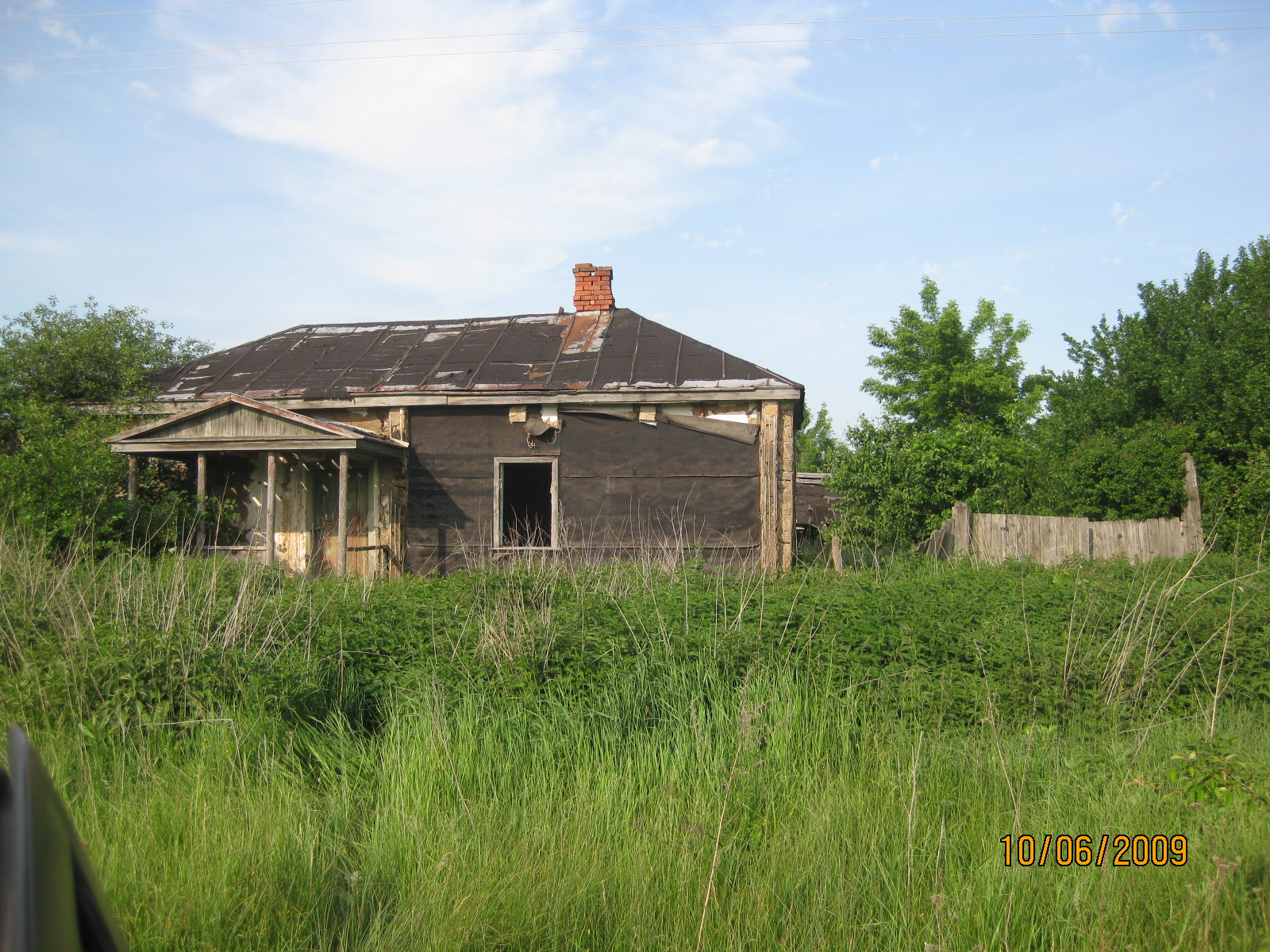

- Location within Voronezh Oblast Location within Russia
- Coordinates: 51°22′N 40°25′E
- Country: Russia
- Region: Voronezh Oblast
- District: Anninsky District
- Time zone: UTC+3:00

Staraya Toyda (Russian: Старая Тойда) is a rural locality (a selo) and the administrative center of Starotoydenskoye Rural Settlement, Anninsky District, Voronezh Oblast, Russia. The population was 679 as of 2010. There are 15 streets.

== Geography ==
Staraya Toyda is located 26 km south of Anna (the district's administrative centre) by road. Verkhnyaya Toyda is the nearest rural locality.
