= Svoboda, Bogucharsky District, Voronezh Oblast =

Svoboda Свобода
- Selo
- Location within Voronezh Oblast Location within Russia
- Coordinates: 50°01′N 40°26′E
- Country: Russia
- Region: Voronezh Oblast
- District: Bogucharsky District
- Time zone: UTC+3:00

Svoboda (Russian: Свобода) is a rural locality (a selo) in Filonovskoye Rural Settlement, Bogucharsky District, Voronezh Oblast, Russia. The population was 175 as of 2010. There are 3 streets.

== Geography ==
Svoboda is located 17 km north of Boguchar (the district's administrative centre) by road. Filonovo is the nearest rural locality.
