= Kulakovka, Voronezh Oblast =

Kulakovka Кулаковка
- Selo
- Location within Voronezh Oblast Location within Russia
- Coordinates: 50°13′N 40°03′E
- Country: Russia
- Region: Voronezh Oblast
- District: Rossoshansky District
- Time zone: UTC+3:00

Kulakovka (Russian: Кулаковка) is a rural locality (a selo) in Starokalitvenskoye Rural Settlement, Rossoshansky District, Voronezh Oblast, Russia. The population was 163 as of 2010. There are 3 streets.

== Geography ==
It is located on the right bank of the Don River, 27 km ENE of Rossosh.
