= Makogonovo =

Makogonovo Макогоново
- Selo
- Location within Voronezh Oblast Location within Russia
- Coordinates: 50°55′N 40°48′E
- Country: Russia
- Region: Voronezh Oblast
- District: Buturlinovsky District
- Time zone: UTC+3:00

Makogonovo (Russian: Макогоново) is a rural locality (a selo) in Serikovskoye Rural Settlement, Buturlinovsky District, Voronezh Oblast, Russia. The population was 193 as of 2010. There are 2 streets.

== Geography ==
Makogonovo is located 28 km northeast of Buturlinovka (the district's administrative centre) by road. Serikovo is the nearest rural locality.
