= Chubrovka =

Chubrovka Чубровка
- Village
- Location within Voronezh Oblast Location within Russia
- Coordinates: 51°45′N 41°34′E
- Country: Russia
- Region: Voronezh Oblast
- District: Ternovsky District
- Time zone: UTC+3:00

Chubrovka (Russian: Чубровка) is a rural locality (a village) in Yesipovskoye Rural Settlement, Ternovsky District, Voronezh Oblast, Russia. The population was 131 as of 2010.

== Geography ==
Chubrovka is located 19 km northwest of Ternovka (the district's administrative centre) by road. Yesipovo is the nearest rural locality.
