= Korenshchina =

Korenshchina Коренщина
- Khutor
- Location within Voronezh Oblast Location within Russia
- Coordinates: 50°23′N 39°44′E
- Country: Russia
- Region: Voronezh Oblast
- District: Podgorensky District
- Time zone: UTC+3:00

Korenshchina (Russian: Коренщина) is a rural locality (a khutor) in Sergeyevskoye Rural Settlement, Podgorensky District, Voronezh Oblast, Russia. The population was 93 as of 2010.

== Geography ==
Korenshchina is located 11 km southeast of Podgorensky (the district's administrative centre) by road. Kuleshovka is the nearest rural locality.
