= Korneyevka, Voronezh Oblast =

Korneyevka Корнеевка
- Khutor
- Location within Voronezh Oblast Location within Russia
- Coordinates: 51°05′N 38°32′E
- Country: Russia
- Region: Voronezh Oblast
- District: Repyovsky District
- Time zone: UTC+3:00

Korneyevka (Russian: Корнеевка) is a rural locality (a khutor) in Butyrskoye Rural Settlement, Repyovsky District, Voronezh Oblast, Russia. The population was 67 as of 2010.

== Geography ==
Korneyevka is located 11 km northwest of Repyovka (the district's administrative centre) by road. Zarosly is the nearest rural locality.
