= Nizhnyaya Maza =

Nizhnyaya Maza Нижняя Маза
- Selo
- Location within Voronezh Oblast Location within Russia
- Coordinates: 51°48′N 40°15′E
- Country: Russia
- Region: Voronezh Oblast
- District: Verkhnekhavsky District
- Time zone: UTC+3:00

Nizhnyaya Maza (Russian: Нижняя Маза) is a rural locality (a selo) in Verkhnemazovskoye Rural Settlement, Verkhnekhavsky District, Voronezh Oblast, Russia. The population was 89 as of 2010.

== Geography ==
Nizhnyaya Maza is located 29 km east of Verkhnyaya Khava (the district's administrative centre) by road. Nikolskoye 3-ye is the nearest rural locality.
