= Savalskogo lesnichestva =

Savalskogo lesnichestva Савальского лесничества
- Settlement
- Location within Voronezh Oblast Location within Russia
- Coordinates: 51°41′N 41°32′E
- Country: Russia
- Region: Voronezh Oblast
- District: Ternovsky District
- Time zone: UTC+3:00

Savalskogo lesnichestva (Russian: Савальского лесничества) (Note: The name is in the genitive form, being part of the descriptive name "посёлок Савальского лесничества", "Settlement of Savalskoye Forestry") is a rural locality (a settlement) in Ternovskoye Rural Settlement, Ternovsky District, Voronezh Oblast, Russia. The population was 55 as of 2010.

== Geography ==
Savalskogo lesnichestva is located 195 km east of Voronezh. Ternovka is the nearest rural locality.
