= Kazinovka =

Kazinovka Казиновка
- Settlement
- Location within Voronezh Oblast Location within Russia
- Coordinates: 51°38′N 40°00′E
- Country: Russia
- Region: Voronezh Oblast
- District: Paninsky District
- Time zone: UTC+3:00

Kazinovka (Russian: Казиновка) is a rural locality (a settlement) in Rostashevskoye Rural Settlement, Paninsky District, Voronezh Oblast, Russia. The population was 83 as of 2010. There are 3 streets.

== Geography ==
Kazinovka is located 10 km west of Panino (the district's administrative centre) by road. Bereznyagi is the nearest rural locality.
