= Alexandrovka (selo), Ternovsky District, Voronezh Oblast =

Alexandrovka Александровка
- Selo
- Location within Voronezh Oblast Location within Russia
- Coordinates: 51°37′N 41°54′E
- Country: Russia
- Region: Voronezh Oblast
- District: Ternovsky District
- Time zone: UTC+3:00

Alexandrovka (Russian: Александровка) is a rural locality (a selo) and the administrative center of Alexandrovskoye Rural Settlement, Ternovsky District, Voronezh Oblast, Russia. The population was 634 as of 2010. There are 15 streets.

== Geography ==
Alexandrovka is located 52 km southwest of Ternovka (the district's administrative centre) by road. Kiselnoye is the nearest rural locality.
