= Pashenkovo =

Pashenkovo Пашенково
- Khutor
- Location within Voronezh Oblast Location within Russia
- Coordinates: 51°17′N 39°10′E
- Country: Russia
- Region: Voronezh Oblast
- District: Khokholsky District
- Time zone: UTC+3:00

Pashenkovo (Russian: Пашенково) is a rural locality (a khutor) in Borshchyovskoye Rural Settlement, Khokholsky District, Voronezh Oblast, Russia. The population was 52 as of 2010.

== Geography ==
Pashenkovo is located 58 km southeast of Khokholsky (the district's administrative centre) by road. Arkhangelskoye is the nearest rural locality.
