= Opytnoy plodovo-yagodnoy stantsii =

Opytnoy plodovo-yagodnoy stantsii Опытной плодово-ягодной станции
- Settlement
- Location within Voronezh Oblast Location within Russia
- Coordinates: 50°09′N 39°33′E
- Country: Russia
- Region: Voronezh Oblast
- District: Rossoshansky District
- Time zone: UTC+3:00

Opytnoy plodovo-yagodnoy stantsii (Russian: Опытной плодово-ягодной станции) is a rural locality (a settlement) and the administrative center of Podgorenskoye Rural Settlement, Rossoshansky District, Voronezh Oblast, Russia. The population was 354 as of 2010.
