= Krasnoflotskoye =

Krasnoflotskoye Краснофлотское
- Selo
- Location within Voronezh Oblast Location within Russia
- Coordinates: 50°04′N 41°14′E
- Country: Russia
- Region: Voronezh Oblast
- District: Petropavlovsky District
- Time zone: UTC+3:00

Krasnoflotskoye (Russian: Краснофлотское) is a rural locality (a selo) and the administrative center of Krasnoflotskoye Rural Settlement, Petropavlovsky District, Voronezh Oblast, Russia. The population was 1,069 as of 2010. There are 7 streets.

== Geography ==
Krasnoflotskoye is located 35 km west of Petropavlovka (the district's administrative centre) by road. Ogarev is the nearest rural locality.
