= Novozhivotinnoye =

Novozhivotinnoye Новоживотинное
- Selo
- Location within Voronezh Oblast Location within Russia
- Coordinates: 51°53′N 39°10′E
- Country: Russia
- Region: Voronezh Oblast
- District: Ramonsky District
- Time zone: UTC+3:00

Novozhivotinnoye (Russian: Новоживотинное) is a rural locality (a selo) and the administrative center of Novozhivotinovskoye Rural Settlement, Ramonsky District, Voronezh Oblast, Russia. The population was 1,997 as of 2010. There are 32 streets.

== Geography ==
Novozhivotinnoye is located 17 km southwest of Ramon (the district's administrative centre) by road. Mokhovatka is the nearest rural locality.
