= Bolshaya Khvoshchevatka =

Bolshaya Khvoshchevatka Большая Хвощеватка
- Khutor
- Location within Voronezh Oblast Location within Russia
- Coordinates: 50°38′N 39°43′E
- Country: Russia
- Region: Voronezh Oblast
- District: Podgorensky District
- Time zone: UTC+3:00

Bolshaya Khvoshchevatka (Russian: Больша́я Хвощеватка) is a rural locality (a khutor) in Sagunovskoye Rural Settlement, Podgorensky District, Voronezh Oblast, Russia. The population was 316 as of 2010. There are 3 streets.

== Geography ==
Bolshaya Khvoshchevatka is located 30 km north of Podgorensky (the district's administrative centre) by road. Yudino is the nearest rural locality.
