= Luki, Voronezh Oblast =

Luki Луки
- Settlement
- Location within Voronezh Oblast Location within Russia
- Coordinates: 50°56′N 39°14′E
- Country: Russia
- Region: Voronezh Oblast
- District: Ostrogozhsky District
- Time zone: UTC+3:00

Luki (Russian: Луки) is a rural locality (a settlement) in Krinichenskoye Rural Settlement, Ostrogozhsky District, Voronezh Oblast, Russia. The population was 736 as of 2010. There are 9 streets.

== Geography ==
Luki is located 27 km northeast of Ostrogozhsk (the district's administrative centre) by road. Peski-Kharkovskiye is the nearest rural locality.
