= Posyolok sovkhoza Trud =

Posyolok sovkhoza Trud Посёлок совхоза «Труд»
- Settlement
- Location within Voronezh Oblast Location within Russia
- Coordinates: 50°09′N 41°14′E
- Country: Russia
- Region: Voronezh Oblast
- District: Petropavlovsky District
- Time zone: UTC+3:00

Posyolok sovkhoza Trud (Russian: Посёлок совхоза «Труд») is a rural locality (a settlement) in Starokriushanskoye Rural Settlement, Petropavlovsky District, Voronezh Oblast, Russia. The population was 74 as of 2010.
