= Karazeyevo =

Karazeyevo Каразеево
- Selo
- Location within Voronezh Oblast Location within Russia
- Coordinates: 49°42′N 40°46′E
- Country: Russia
- Region: Voronezh Oblast
- District: Bogucharsky District
- Time zone: UTC+3:00

Karazeyevo (Russian: Каразеево) is a rural locality (a selo) in Medovskoye Rural Settlement, Bogucharsky District, Voronezh Oblast, Russia. The population was 78 as of 2010. There are 7 streets.

== Geography ==
Karazeyevo is located 44 km southeast of Boguchar (the district's administrative centre) by road. Yuzhny is the nearest rural locality.
