= Sasovka 1-ya =

Sasovka 1-ya Сасовка 1-я
- Khutor
- Location within Voronezh Oblast Location within Russia
- Coordinates: 51°02′N 38°53′E
- Country: Russia
- Region: Voronezh Oblast
- District: Repyovsky District
- Time zone: UTC+3:00

Sasovka 1-ya (Russian: Сасовка 1-я) is a rural locality (a khutor) in Kolbinskoye Rural Settlement, Repyovsky District, Voronezh Oblast, Russia. The population was 61 as of 2010.

== Geography ==
Sasovka 1-ya is located 22 km east of Repyovka (the district's administrative centre) by road. Kolbino is the nearest rural locality.
