= Novogremyachenskoye =

Novogremyachenskoye Новогремяченское
- Selo
- Location within Voronezh Oblast Location within Russia
- Coordinates: 51°32′N 39°02′E
- Country: Russia
- Region: Voronezh Oblast
- District: Khokholsky District
- Time zone: UTC+3:00

Novogremyachenskoye (Russian: Новогремяченское) is a rural locality (a selo) and the administrative center of Novogremyachenskoye Rural Settlement, Khokholsky District, Voronezh Oblast, Russia. The population was 1,642 as of 2010. There are 26 streets.

== Geography ==
Novogremyachenskoye is located on the right bank of the Don River, 27 km southeast of Khokholsky (the district's administrative centre) by road. Ustye is the nearest rural locality.
