= Posyolok sovkhoza Rossoshansky =

Posyolok sovkhoza Rossoshansky Посёлок совхоза «Россошанский»
- Settlement
- Location within Voronezh Oblast Location within Russia
- Coordinates: 50°11′N 39°27′E
- Country: Russia
- Region: Voronezh Oblast
- District: Rossoshansky District
- Time zone: UTC+3:00

Posyolok sovkhoza Rossoshansky (Russian: Посёлок совхоза «Россошанский») is a rural locality (a settlement) in Arkhipovskoye Rural Settlement, Rossoshansky District, Voronezh Oblast, Russia. The population was 571 as of 2010. There are 10 streets.

== Geography ==
The settlement is located 10 km west of Rossosh (the district's administrative centre) by road. Arkhipovka is the nearest rural locality.
