= Manidinsky =

Manidinsky Манидинский
- Settlement
- Location within Voronezh Oblast Location within Russia
- Coordinates: 51°14′N 40°37′E
- Country: Russia
- Region: Voronezh Oblast
- District: Talovsky District
- Time zone: UTC+3:00

Manidinsky (Russian: Манидинский) is a rural locality (a settlement) in Alexandrovskoye Rural Settlement, Talovsky District, Voronezh Oblast, Russia. The population was 72 as of 2010.

== Geography ==
Manidinsky is located 20 km northwest of Talovaya (the district's administrative centre) by road. Alexandrovka is the nearest rural locality.
