= Kopanaya 1-ya =

Kopanaya 1-ya Копаная 1-я
- Selo
- Location within Voronezh Oblast Location within Russia
- Coordinates: 50°27′N 39°05′E
- Country: Russia
- Region: Voronezh Oblast
- District: Olkhovatsky District
- Time zone: UTC+3:00

Kopanaya 1-ya (Russian: Копаная 1-я) is a rural locality (a selo) and the administrative center of Kopanyanskoye Rural Settlement, Olkhovatsky District, Voronezh Oblast, Russia. The population was 293 as of 2010. There are 5 streets.

== Geography ==
It is located 25 km northwest from Olkhovatka.
