= Bychok =

Bychok Бычок
- Selo
- Location within Voronezh Oblast Location within Russia
- Coordinates: 50°01′N 40°46′E
- Country: Russia
- Region: Voronezh Oblast
- District: Petropavlovsky District
- Time zone: UTC+3:00

Bychok (Russian: Бычок) is a rural locality (a selo) and the administrative center of Bychkovskoye Rural Settlement, Petropavlovsky District, Voronezh Oblast, Russia. The population was 972 as of 2010. There are 25 streets.

== Geography ==
Bychok is located 12 km southwest of Petropavlovka (the district's administrative centre) by road. Zamostye is the nearest rural locality.
