= Samoylenko, Voronezh Oblast =

Samoylenko Самойленко
- Khutor
- Location within Voronezh Oblast Location within Russia
- Coordinates: 50°22′N 39°30′E
- Country: Russia
- Region: Voronezh Oblast
- District: Podgorensky District
- Time zone: UTC+3:00

Samoylenko (Russian: Само́йленко) is a rural locality (a khutor) in Skororybskoye Rural Settlement, Podgorensky District, Voronezh Oblast, Russia. The population was 52 as of 2010. There are 3 streets.

== Geography ==
Samoylenko is located 12 km west of Podgorensky (the district's administrative centre) by road. Bolshoy Skororyb is the nearest rural locality.
