= Novy Liman =

Novy Liman Новый Лиман
- Selo
- Location within Voronezh Oblast Location within Russia
- Coordinates: 49°56′N 40°55′E
- Country: Russia
- Region: Voronezh Oblast
- District: Petropavlovsky District
- Time zone: UTC+3:00

Novy Liman (Russian: Новый Лиман) is a rural locality (a selo) and the administrative center of Novolimanskoye Rural Settlement, Petropavlovsky District, Voronezh Oblast, Russia. The population was 484 as of 2010. There are 3 streets.

== Geography ==
Novy Liman is located 21 km south of Petropavlovka (the district's administrative centre) by road. Progoreloye is the nearest rural locality.
