= Malaya Vereyka =

Malaya Vereyka Малая Верейка
- Selo
- Location within Voronezh Oblast Location within Russia
- Coordinates: 51°58′N 38°43′E
- Country: Russia
- Region: Voronezh Oblast
- District: Semiluksky District
- Time zone: UTC+3:00

Malaya Vereyka (Russian: Малая Верейка) is a rural locality (a selo) in Zemlyanskoye Rural Settlement, Semiluksky District, Voronezh Oblast, Russia. The population was 543 as of 2010. There are 11 streets.

== Geography ==
Malaya Vereyka is located 49 km northwest of Semiluki (the district's administrative centre) by road. Dolgoye is the nearest rural locality.
