= Belovka =

Belovka Беловка
- Selo
- Location within Voronezh Oblast Location within Russia
- Coordinates: 51°54′N 39°48′E
- Country: Russia
- Region: Voronezh Oblast
- District: Verkhnekhavsky District
- Time zone: UTC+3:00

Belovka (Russian: Беловка) is a rural locality (a selo) in Bolsheprivalovskoye Rural Settlement, Verkhnekhavsky District, Voronezh Oblast, Russia. The population was 154 as of 2010. There are 3 streets.

== Geography ==
Belovka is located 19 km northwest of Verkhnyaya Khava (the district's administrative centre) by road. Bolshaya Privalovka is the nearest rural locality.
