= Kalmychyok =

Kalmychyok Калмычёк
- Selo
- Location within Voronezh Oblast Location within Russia
- Coordinates: 51°41′N 40°06′E
- Country: Russia
- Region: Voronezh Oblast
- District: Paninsky District
- Time zone: UTC+3:00

Kalmychyok (Russian: Калмычёк) is a rural locality (a selo) in Panino, Paninsky District, Voronezh Oblast, Russia. The population was 174 as of 2010. There are six streets.

== Geography ==
Kalmychyok is located 8 km north of Panino (the district's administrative centre) by road. Khavenka is the nearest rural locality.
