= Shinkin, Voronezh Oblast =

Shinkin Шинкин
- Khutor
- Location within Voronezh Oblast Location within Russia
- Coordinates: 50°42′N 38°53′E
- Country: Russia
- Region: Voronezh Oblast
- District: Ostrogozhsky District
- Time zone: UTC+3:00

Shinkin (Russian: Шинкин) is a rural locality (a khutor) in Olshanskoye Rural Settlement, Ostrogozhsky District, Voronezh Oblast, Russia. The population was 166 as of 2010. There are 7 streets.

== Geography ==
Shinkin is located 28 km southwest of Ostrogozhsk (the district's administrative centre) by road. Nizhny Olshan is the nearest rural locality.
