= Shestakovo, Voronezh Oblast =

Shestakovo Шестаково
- Selo
- Location within Voronezh Oblast Location within Russia
- Coordinates: 50°47′N 40°03′E
- Country: Russia
- Region: Voronezh Oblast
- District: Bobrovsky District
- Time zone: UTC+3:00

Shestakovo (Russian: Шестаково) is a rural locality (a selo) and the administrative center of Shestakovskoye Rural Settlement, Bobrovsky District, Voronezh Oblast, Russia. The population was 1,112 as of 2010. There are 20 streets.

== Geography ==
Shestakovo is located 63 km south of Bobrov (the district's administrative centre) by road. Lipovka is the nearest rural locality.
