= Buravtsovka =

Buravtsovka Буравцовка
- Village
- Location within Voronezh Oblast Location within Russia
- Coordinates: 51°41′N 40°57′E
- Country: Russia
- Region: Voronezh Oblast
- District: Ertilsky District
- Time zone: UTC+3:00

Buravtsovka (Russian: Буравцовка) is a rural locality (a village) and the administrative center of Buravtsovskoye Rural Settlement, Ertilsky District, Voronezh Oblast, Russia. The population was 402 as of 2010. There are 3 streets.

== Geography ==
Buravtsovka is located 25 km southeast of Ertil (the district's administrative centre) by road. Begichevo is the nearest rural locality.
