= Shekalovka =

Shekalovka Шекаловка
- Selo
- Location within Voronezh Oblast Location within Russia
- Coordinates: 50°02′N 39°18′E
- Country: Russia
- Region: Voronezh Oblast
- District: Rossoshansky District
- Time zone: UTC+3:00

Shekalovka (Russian: Шекаловка) is a rural locality (a selo) and the administrative center of Shekalovskoye Rural Settlement, Rossoshansky District, Voronezh Oblast, Russia. The population was 625 as of 2010. There are eight streets.

== Geography ==
Shekalovka is located 32 km northwest of Rossosh (the district's administrative centre) by road. Novosyolovka is the nearest rural locality.
