= Sredny Karachan =

Sredny Karachan Средний Карачан
- Selo
- Location within Voronezh Oblast Location within Russia
- Coordinates: 51°22′N 41°46′E
- Country: Russia
- Region: Voronezh Oblast
- District: Gribanovsky District
- Time zone: UTC+3:00

Sredny Karachan (Russian: Сре́дний Карача́н) is a rural locality (a selo) in Verkhnekarachanskoye Rural Settlement, Gribanovsky District, Voronezh Oblast, Russia. The population was 1,091 as of 2010. There are 12 streets.

== Geography ==
Sredny Karachan is located on the Karachan River, 18 km southwest of Gribanovsky (the district's administrative centre) by road. Verkhny Karachan is the nearest rural locality.
