= Kovalyovo, Voronezh Oblast =

Kovalyovo Ковалёво
- Selo
- Location within Voronezh Oblast Location within Russia
- Coordinates: 50°53′N 39°23′E
- Country: Russia
- Region: Voronezh Oblast
- District: Liskinsky District
- Time zone: UTC+3:00

Kovalyovo (Russian: Ковалёво) is a rural locality (a selo) and the administrative center of Kovalyovskoye Rural Settlement, Liskinsky District, Voronezh Oblast, Russia. The population was 1,303 as of 2010. There are 23 streets.

== Geography ==
Kovalyovo is located 30 km southwest of Liski (the district's administrative centre) by road. Shepelev is the nearest rural locality.
