= Timiryazevsky, Voronezh Oblast =

Timiryazevsky Тимирязевский
- Settlement
- Location within Voronezh Oblast Location within Russia
- Coordinates: 51°37′N 40°11′E
- Country: Russia
- Region: Voronezh Oblast
- District: Paninsky District
- Time zone: UTC+3:00

Timiryazevsky (Russian: Тимирязевский) is a rural locality (a settlement) in Mikhaylovskoye Rural Settlement, Paninsky District, Voronezh Oblast, Russia. The population was 207 as of 2010. There are 4 streets.

== Geography ==
Timiryazevsky is located 6 km southeast of Panino (the district's administrative centre) by road. Toyda is the nearest rural locality.
