= Fabritskoye =

Fabritskoye Фабрицкое
- Selo
- Location within Voronezh Oblast Location within Russia
- Coordinates: 51°05′N 38°47′E
- Country: Russia
- Region: Voronezh Oblast
- District: Repyovsky District
- Time zone: UTC+3:00

Fabritskoye (Russian: Фабрицкое) is a rural locality (a selo) in Skoritskoye Rural Settlement, Repyovsky District, Voronezh Oblast, Russia. The population was 222 as of 2010. There are 3 streets.

== Geography ==
Fabritskoye is located 19 km east of Repyovka (the district's administrative centre) by road. Prudovy is the nearest rural locality.
