= Verkhny Ikorets =

Verkhny Ikorets Верхний Икорец
- Selo
- Location within Voronezh Oblast Location within Russia
- Coordinates: 51°10′N 39°47′E
- Country: Russia
- Region: Voronezh Oblast
- District: Bobrovsky District
- Time zone: UTC+3:00

Verkhny Ikorets (Russian: Верхний Икорец) is a rural locality (a selo) and the administrative center of Verkhneikoretskoye Rural Settlement, Bobrovsky District, Voronezh Oblast, Russia. The population was 1,155 as of 2010. There are 16 streets.

== Geography ==
Verkhny Ikorets is located 21 km northwest of Bobrov (the district's administrative centre) by road. Neskuchny is the nearest rural locality.
