= Plesnovka =

Plesnovka Плесновка
- Selo
- Location within Voronezh Oblast Location within Russia
- Coordinates: 49°39′N 40°29′E
- Country: Russia
- Region: Voronezh Oblast
- District: Bogucharsky District
- Time zone: UTC+3:00

Plesnovka (Russian: Плесновка) is a rural locality (a selo) in Pervomayskoye Rural Settlement, Bogucharsky District, Voronezh Oblast, Russia. The population was 296 as of 2010. There are 4 streets.

== Geography ==
Plesnovka is located 39 km south of Boguchar (the district's administrative centre) by road. Lebedinka is the nearest rural locality.
