= Aleynikovo, Voronezh Oblast =

Aleynikovo Алейниково
- Selo
- Location within Voronezh Oblast Location within Russia
- Coordinates: 50°14′N 39°48′E
- Country: Russia
- Region: Voronezh Oblast
- District: Rossoshansky District
- Time zone: UTC+3:00

Aleynikovo (Russian: Алейниково) is a rural locality (a selo) in Aleynikovskoye Rural Settlement, Rossoshansky District, Voronezh Oblast, Russia. The population was 536 as of 2010. There are 3 streets.

== Geography ==
Aleynikovo is located 21 km northeast of Rossosh (the district's administrative centre) by road. Pavlovka is the nearest rural locality.
