= Odintsovka, Voronezh Oblast =

Odintsovka Одинцовка
- Selo
- Location within Voronezh Oblast Location within Russia
- Coordinates: 51°05′N 38°26′E
- Country: Russia
- Region: Voronezh Oblast
- District: Repyovsky District
- Time zone: UTC+3:00

Odintsovka (Russian: Одинцовка) is a rural locality (a selo) in Rossoshanskoye Rural Settlement, Repyovsky District, Voronezh Oblast, Russia. The population was 340 as of 2010. There are 4 streets.

== Geography ==
Odintsovka is located 18 km northwest of Repyovka (the district's administrative centre) by road. Vladimirovka is the nearest rural locality.
