= Pchelinovka =

Pchelinovka Пчелиновка
- Selo
- Location within Voronezh Oblast Location within Russia
- Coordinates: 50°56′N 40°00′E
- Country: Russia
- Region: Voronezh Oblast
- District: Bobrovsky District
- Time zone: UTC+3:00

Pchelinovka (Russian: Пчелиновка) is a rural locality (a selo) and the administrative center of Pchelinovskoye Rural Settlement, Bobrovsky District, Voronezh Oblast, Russia. The population was 634 as of 2010. The locality contains 11 streets.

== Geography ==
Pchelinovka is located 22 km south of Bobrov (the district's administrative centre) by road. Nikolo-Varvarinka is the nearest rural locality.
