= Zabolotovka =

Zabolotovka Заболотовка
- Settlement
- Location within Voronezh Oblast Location within Russia
- Coordinates: 50°16′N 39°19′E
- Country: Russia
- Region: Voronezh Oblast
- District: Olkhovatsky District
- Time zone: UTC+3:00

Zabolotovka (Russian: Заболотовка) is a rural locality (a settlement) in Olkhovatskoye Urban Settlement, Olkhovatsky District, Voronezh Oblast, Russia. The population was 3,156 as of 2010. There are 25 streets.

== Geography ==
Zabolotovka is located 3 km southeast of Olkhovatka (the district's administrative centre) by road. Bugayevka is the nearest rural locality.
