= Staraya Melovaya =

Staraya Melovaya Старая Меловая
- Selo
- Location within Voronezh Oblast Location within Russia
- Coordinates: 50°17′N 40°51′E
- Country: Russia
- Region: Voronezh Oblast
- District: Petropavlovsky District
- Time zone: UTC+3:00

Staraya Melovaya (Russian: Старая Меловая) is a rural locality (a selo) and the administrative center of Staromelovatskoye Rural Settlement, Petropavlovsky District, Voronezh Oblast, Russia. The population was 539 as of 2010. There are 19 streets.

== Geography ==
Staraya Melovaya is located 23 km north of Petropavlovka (the district's administrative centre) by road. Peski is the nearest rural locality.
