= Derezovka =

Derezovka Дерезовка
- Selo
- Location within Voronezh Oblast Location within Russia
- Coordinates: 50°04′N 40°18′E
- Country: Russia
- Region: Voronezh Oblast
- District: Verkhnemamonsky District
- Time zone: UTC+3:00

Derezovka (Russian: Дерезовка) is a rural locality (a selo) and the administrative center of Derezovskoye Rural Settlement, Verkhnemamonsky District, Voronezh Oblast, Russia. The population was 825 as of 2010. There are 15 streets.

== Geography ==
Derezovka is located 34 km southwest of Verkhny Mamon (the district's administrative centre) by road. Dubovikovo is the nearest rural locality.
