= Parizhskaya Kommuna, Voronezh Oblast =

Parizhskaya Kommuna Парижская Коммуна
- Selo
- Location within Voronezh Oblast Location within Russia
- Coordinates: 51°47′N 39°37′E
- Country: Russia
- Region: Voronezh Oblast
- District: Verkhnekhavsky District
- Time zone: UTC+3:00

Parizhskaya Kommuna (Russian: Парижская Коммуна) is a rural locality (a selo) and the administrative center of Parizhskokommunskoye Rural Settlement, Verkhnekhavsky District, Voronezh Oblast, Russia. The population was 844 as of 2010. There are 5 streets.

== Geography ==
Parizhskaya Kommuna is located 27 km west of Verkhnyaya Khava (the district's administrative centre) by road. Nikonovo is the nearest rural locality.
