= Kurennoye =

Kurennoye Куренное
- Khutor
- Location within Voronezh Oblast Location within Russia
- Coordinates: 50°20′N 39°50′E
- Country: Russia
- Region: Voronezh Oblast
- District: Podgorensky District
- Time zone: UTC+3:00

Kurennoye (Russian: Куренно́е) is a rural locality (a khutor) in Semeyskoye Rural Settlement, Podgorensky District, Voronezh Oblast, Russia. The population was 138 as of 2010. There are 5 streets.

== Geography ==
Kurennoye is located 28 km southeast of Podgorensky (the district's administrative centre) by road. Saprino is the nearest rural locality.
