= Bondarevo =

Bondarevo Бондарево
- Selo
- Location within Voronezh Oblast Location within Russia
- Coordinates: 49°47′N 39°26′E
- Country: Russia
- Region: Voronezh Oblast
- District: Kantemirovsky District
- Time zone: UTC+3:00

Bondarevo (Russian: Бондарево) is a rural locality (a selo) and the administrative center of Bondarevskoye Rural Settlement, Kantemirovsky District, Voronezh Oblast, Russia. The population was 808 as of 2010. There are 7 streets.

== Geography ==
Bondarevo is located 53 km northwest of Kantemirovka (the district's administrative centre) by road. Volokonovka is the nearest rural locality.
