= Kopyl, Voronezh Oblast =

Kopyl Копыл
- Selo
- Location within Voronezh Oblast Location within Russia
- Coordinates: 51°39′N 41°02′E
- Country: Russia
- Region: Voronezh Oblast
- District: Ertilsky District
- Time zone: UTC+3:00

Kopyl (Russian: Копыл) is a rural locality (a selo) and the administrative center of Alexandrovskoye Rural Settlement, Ertilsky District, Voronezh Oblast, Russia. The population was 537 as of 2010. There are 16 streets.

== Geography ==
Kopyl is located on the left bank of the Tokay River, 31 km southeast of Ertil (the district's administrative centre) by road. Tambovka is the nearest rural locality.
