= Yudanovka =

Yudanovka Юдановка
- Selo
- Location within Voronezh Oblast Location within Russia
- Coordinates: 51°16′N 39°50′E
- Country: Russia
- Region: Voronezh Oblast
- District: Bobrovsky District
- Time zone: UTC+3:00

Yudanovka (Russian: Юдановка) is a rural locality (a selo) and the administrative center of Yudanovskoye Rural Settlement, Bobrovsky District, Voronezh Oblast, Russia. The population was 611 as of 2010. There are 4 streets.

== Geography ==
Yudanovka is located 32 km northwest of Bobrov (the district's administrative centre) by road. Peskovatka is the nearest rural locality.
