= Kopanishche =

Kopanishche Копанище
- Selo
- Location within Voronezh Oblast Location within Russia
- Coordinates: 51°00′N 39°19′E
- Country: Russia
- Region: Voronezh Oblast
- District: Liskinsky District
- Time zone: UTC+3:00

Kopanishche (Russian: Копанище) is a rural locality (a selo) and the administrative center of Kopanishchenskoye Rural Settlement, Liskinsky District, Voronezh Oblast, Russia. The population was 958 as of 2010. There are 10 streets.

== Geography ==
Kopanishche is located 20 km west of Liski (the district's administrative centre) by road. Podlesny is the nearest rural locality.
