= Chagari =

Chagari Чагари
- Khutor
- Location within Voronezh Oblast Location within Russia
- Coordinates: 50°03′N 39°27′E
- Country: Russia
- Region: Voronezh Oblast
- District: Rossoshansky District
- Time zone: UTC+3:00

Chagari (Russian: Чагари) is a rural locality (a khutor) in Lizinovskoye Rural Settlement, Rossoshansky District, Voronezh Oblast, Russia. The population was 210 as of 2010. There are 3 streets.

== Geography ==
Chagari is located 23 km southwest of Rossosh (the district's administrative centre) by road. Lizinovka is the nearest rural locality.
