= Radchenskoye =

Radchenskoye Радченское
- Selo
- Location within Voronezh Oblast Location within Russia
- Coordinates: 49°48′N 40°30′E
- Country: Russia
- Region: Voronezh Oblast
- District: Bogucharsky District
- Time zone: UTC+3:00

Radchenskoye (Russian: Радченское) is a rural locality (a selo) and the administrative center of Radchenskoye Rural Settlement, Bogucharsky District, Voronezh Oblast, Russia. The population was 1,175 as of 2010. There are 23 streets.

== Geography ==
Radchenskoye is located on the right bank of the Levaya Bogucharka River, 18 km of from Boguchar (the district's administrative centre) by road. Dyadin is the nearest rural locality.
