= Utinovka =

Utinovka Утиновка
- Settlement
- Location within Voronezh Oblast Location within Russia
- Coordinates: 51°03′N 40°52′E
- Country: Russia
- Region: Voronezh Oblast
- District: Talovsky District
- Time zone: UTC+3:00

Utinovka (Russian: Утиновка) is a rural locality (a settlement) in Nizhnekamenskoye Rural Settlement, Talovsky District, Voronezh Oblast, Russia. The population was 291 as of 2010. There are 4 streets.

== Geography ==
Utinovka is located 16 km southeast of Talovaya (the district's administrative centre) by road. Talovaya is the nearest rural locality.
