= Yasenki =

Yasenki Ясенки
- Settlement
- Location within Voronezh Oblast Location within Russia
- Coordinates: 51°02′N 39°58′E
- Country: Russia
- Region: Voronezh Oblast
- District: Bobrovsky District
- Time zone: UTC+3:00

Yasenki (Russian: Ясенки) is a rural locality (a settlement) and the administrative center of Yasenkovskoye Rural Settlement, Bobrovsky District, Voronezh Oblast, Russia. The population was 611 as of 2010. There are 17 streets.

== Geography ==
Yasenki is located 8 km southwest of Bobrov (the district's administrative centre) by road. Bityug is the nearest rural locality.
