= 2nd otdeleniya sovkhoza 'Maslovskiy' =

2nd otdeleniya sovkhoza 'Maslovskiy' 2-го отделения совхоза «Масловский»
- Settlement
- Location within Voronezh Oblast Location within Russia
- Coordinates: 51°30′N 39°26′E
- Country: Russia
- Region: Voronezh Oblast
- District: Novousmansky District
- Time zone: UTC+03:00

2nd otdeleniya sovkhoza 'Maslovskiy' is a settlement in Novousmansky District, Voronezh Oblast, Russia. The population was 335 as of 2010. There are 3 streets.

== Geography ==
2nd otdeleniya sovkhoza 'Maslovskiy' is located 20 km southwest of Novaya Usman (the district's administrative centre) by road. Maslovka is the nearest rural locality.
