= Veryovkin 2-y =

Veryovkin 2-y Верёвкин 2-й
- Settlement
- Location within Voronezh Oblast Location within Russia
- Coordinates: 51°07′N 40°46′E
- Country: Russia
- Region: Voronezh Oblast
- District: Talovsky District
- Time zone: UTC+3:00

Veryovkin 2-y (Russian: Верёвкин 2-й) is a rural locality (a settlement) in Nizhnekamenskoye Rural Settlement, Talovsky District, Voronezh Oblast, Russia. The population was 168 as of 2010.

== Geography ==
Veryovkin 2-y is located 8 km northeast of Talovaya (the district's administrative centre) by road. Nizhnyaya Kamenka is the nearest rural locality.
