= Zelyony Gay =

Zelyony Gay Зелёный Гай
- Settlement
- Location within Voronezh Oblast Location within Russia
- Coordinates: 50°48′N 40°31′E
- Country: Russia
- Region: Voronezh Oblast
- District: Buturlinovsky District
- Time zone: UTC+3:00

Zelyony Gay (Russian: Зелёный Гай) is a rural locality (a settlement) in Beryozovskoye Rural Settlement, Buturlinovsky District, Voronezh Oblast, Russia. The population was 240 as of 2010. There are 3 streets.

== Geography ==
Zelyony Gay is located 7 km southwest of Buturlinovka (the district's administrative centre) by road. Maryevka is the nearest rural locality.
