= Alexandrovka, Verkhnekhavsky District, Voronezh Oblast.docx =

Alexandrovka Александровка
- Selo
- Location within Voronezh Oblast Location within Russia
- Coordinates: 51°50′N 40°19′E
- Country: Russia
- Region: Voronezh Oblast
- District: Verkhnekhavsky District
- Time zone: UTC+3:00

Alexandrovka (Russian: Александровка) is a rural locality (a selo) and the administrative center of Alexandrovskoye Rural Settlement, Verkhnekhavsky District, Voronezh Oblast, Russia. The population was 285 as of 2010. There are 2 streets.

== Geography ==
Alexandrovka is located 35 km east of Verkhnyaya Khava (the district's administrative centre) by road. Mitrofanovka is the nearest rural locality.
