= Khrenishche =

Khrenishche Хренище
- Khutor
- Location within Voronezh Oblast Location within Russia
- Coordinates: 51°05′N 39°47′E
- Country: Russia
- Region: Voronezh Oblast
- District: Bobrovsky District
- Time zone: UTC+3:00

Khrenishche (Russian: Хренище) is a rural locality (a khutor) in Nikolskoye Rural Settlement, Bobrovsky District, Voronezh Oblast, Russia. The population was 99 as of 2010.

== Geography ==
Khrenishche is located 20 km west of Bobrov (the district's administrative centre) by road. Sredny Ikorets is the nearest rural locality.
