= Anokhinka =

Anokhinka Анохинка
- Settlement
- Location within Voronezh Oblast Location within Russia
- Coordinates: 51°01′N 40°58′E
- Country: Russia
- Region: Voronezh Oblast
- District: Talovsky District
- Time zone: UTC+3:00

Anokhinka (Russian: Анохинка) is a rural locality (a settlement) in Nizhnekamenskoye Rural Settlement, Talovsky District, Voronezh Oblast, Russia. The population was 167 as of 2010. There are 3 streets.

== Geography ==
It is located 17 km southeast of Talovaya.
