= Probuzhdeniye, Voronezh Oblast =

Probuzhdeniye Пробуждение
- Settlement
- Location within Voronezh Oblast Location within Russia
- Coordinates: 50°31′N 39°35′E
- Country: Russia
- Region: Voronezh Oblast
- District: Podgorensky District
- Time zone: UTC+3:00

Probuzhdeniye (Russian: Пробужде́ние) is a rural locality (a settlement) and the administrative center of Perevalenskoye Rural Settlement, Podgorensky District, Voronezh Oblast, Russia. The population was 487 as of 2010. There are 8 streets.

== Geography ==
Probuzhdeniye is located 21 km north of Podgorensky (the district's administrative centre) by road. Perevalnoye is the nearest rural locality.
