= Chertovitsy =

Chertovitsy Чертовицы
- Selo
- Location within Voronezh Oblast Location within Russia
- Coordinates: 51°49′N 39°16′E
- Country: Russia
- Region: Voronezh Oblast
- District: Ramonsky District
- Time zone: UTC+3:00

Chertovitsy (Russian: Чертовицы) is a rural locality (a selo) in Aydarovskoye Rural Settlement, Ramonsky District, Voronezh Oblast, Russia. The population was 1,199 as of 2010. There are 37 streets.

== Geography ==
Chertovitsy is located 23 km southwest of Ramon (the district's administrative centre) by road. Solnechny is the nearest rural locality.
