= Kulishovka =

Kulishovka Кулишовка
- Settlement
- Location within Voronezh Oblast Location within Russia
- Coordinates: 50°20′N 39°17′E
- Country: Russia
- Region: Voronezh Oblast
- District: Olkhovatsky District
- Time zone: UTC+3:00

Kulishovka (Russian: Кулишовка) is a rural locality (a settlement) in Novokharkovskoye Rural Settlement, Olkhovatsky District, Voronezh Oblast, Russia. The population was 83 as of 2010.

== Geography ==
Kulishovka is located 9 km north of Olkhovatka (the district's administrative centre) by road. Kulishovka is the nearest rural locality.
