= Pogorelovka, Voronezh Oblast =

Pogorelovka Погореловка
- Khutor
- Location within Voronezh Oblast Location within Russia
- Coordinates: 50°26′N 39°48′E
- Country: Russia
- Region: Voronezh Oblast
- District: Podgorensky District
- Time zone: UTC+3:00

Pogorelovka (Russian: Погоре́ловка) is a rural locality (a khutor) in Sergeyevskoye Rural Settlement, Podgorensky District, Voronezh Oblast, Russia. The population was 62 as of 2010. There are 2 streets.

== Geography ==
Pogorelovka is located 17 km east of Podgorensky (the district's administrative centre) by road. Sergeyevka is the nearest rural locality.
