= Pervomaysky, Ertilsky District, Voronezh Oblast =

Pervomaysky Первомайский
- Settlement
- Location within Voronezh Oblast Location within Russia
- Coordinates: 51°43′N 40°42′E
- Country: Russia
- Region: Voronezh Oblast
- District: Ertilsky District
- Time zone: UTC+3:00

Pervomaysky (Russian: Первомайский) is a rural locality (a settlement) and the administrative center of Pervomayskoye Rural Settlement, Ertilsky District, Voronezh Oblast, Russia. The population was 880 as of 2010. There are 21 streets.

== Geography ==
Pervomaysky is located 22 km southwest of Ertil (the district's administrative centre) by road. Ertil is the nearest rural locality.
