= Bolshiye Yasyrki =

Bolshiye Yasyrki Большие Ясырки
- Settlement
- Location within Voronezh Oblast Location within Russia
- Coordinates: 51°40′N 40°16′E
- Country: Russia
- Region: Voronezh Oblast
- District: Paninsky District
- Time zone: UTC+3:00

Bolshiye Yasyrki (Russian: Большие Ясырки) is a rural locality (a settlement) in Perelyoshinskoye Urban Settlement, Paninsky District, Voronezh Oblast, Russia. The population was 223 as of 2010. There are 6 streets.

== Geography ==
Bolshiye Yasyrki is located 14 km (8.7 mi) northeast of Panino (the district's administrative centre) by road. Alekseyevka is the nearest rural locality.
