= Kolodeyevka =

Kolodeyevka Колодеевка
- Selo
- Location within Voronezh Oblast Location within Russia
- Coordinates: 50°51′N 41°00′E
- Country: Russia
- Region: Voronezh Oblast
- District: Buturlinovsky District
- Time zone: UTC+3:00

Kolodeyevka (Russian: Колодеевка) is a rural locality (a selo) and the administrative center of Kolodeyevskoye Rural Settlement, Buturlinovsky District, Voronezh Oblast, Russia. The population was 530 as of 2010. There are 4 streets.

== Geography ==
Kolodeyevka is located 38 km east of Buturlinovka (the district's administrative centre) by road. Kucheryayevka is the nearest rural locality.
