= Chervono-Chekhursky =

Chervono-Chekhursky Червоно-Чехурский
- Khutor
- Location within Voronezh Oblast Location within Russia
- Coordinates: 50°04′N 40°49′E
- Country: Russia
- Region: Voronezh Oblast
- District: Petropavlovsky District
- Time zone: UTC+3:00

Chervono-Chekhursky (Russian: Червоно-Чехурский) is a rural locality (a khutor) in Petropavlovskoye Rural Settlement, Petropavlovsky District, Voronezh Oblast, Russia. The population was 78 as of 2010. There are 5 streets.

== Geography ==
Chervono-Chekhursky is located 7 km southwest of Petropavlovka (the district's administrative centre) by road. Petropavlovka is the nearest rural locality.
