= Gorozhanka =

Gorozhanka Горожанка
- Selo
- Location within Voronezh Oblast Location within Russia
- Coordinates: 51°59′N 39°06′E
- Country: Russia
- Region: Voronezh Oblast
- District: Ramonsky District
- Time zone: UTC+3:00

Gorozhanka (Russian: Горожанка) is a rural locality (a selo) in Gorozhanskoye Rural Settlement, Ramonsky District, Voronezh Oblast, Russia. The population was 428 as of 2010. There are 6 streets.

== Geography ==
Gorozhanka is located on the left bank of the Don River, 25 km northwest of Ramon (the district's administrative centre) by road. Petrovskoye is the nearest rural locality.
