= Usmanskiye Vyselki =

Usmanskiye Vyselki Усманские Выселки
- Selo
- Location within Voronezh Oblast Location within Russia
- Coordinates: 51°28′N 39°44′E
- Country: Russia
- Region: Voronezh Oblast
- District: Paninsky District
- Time zone: UTC+3:00

Usmanskiye Vyselki (Russian: Усманские Выселки) is a rural locality (a selo) in Krasnolimanskoye Rural Settlement, Paninsky District, Voronezh Oblast, Russia. The population was 91 as of 2010. There are 2 streets.

== Geography ==
Usmanskiye Vyselki is located 47 km southwest of Panino (the district's administrative centre) by road. Pavlovka is the nearest rural locality.
