= Yevdokiyevka =

Yevdokiyevka Евдокиевка
- Selo
- Location within Voronezh Oblast Location within Russia
- Coordinates: 49°58′N 39°43′E
- Country: Russia
- Region: Voronezh Oblast
- District: Kantemirovsky District
- Time zone: UTC+3:00

Yevdokiyevka (Russian: Евдокиевка) is a rural locality (a selo) in Mitrofanovskoye Rural Settlement, Kantemirovsky District, Voronezh Oblast, Russia. The population was 478 as of 2010. There are 3 streets.

== Geography ==
Yevdokiyevka is located 44 km (27 mi) north of Kantemirovka (the district's administrative centre) by road. Mitrofanovka is the nearest rural locality.
