= Chernavka, Buturlinovsky District, Voronezh Oblast =

Chernavka Чернавка
- Village
- Location within Voronezh Oblast Location within Russia
- Coordinates: 50°41′N 40°21′E
- Country: Russia
- Region: Voronezh Oblast
- District: Buturlinovsky District
- Time zone: UTC+3:00

Chernavka (Russian: Чернавка) is a rural locality (a village) in Puzevskoye Rural Settlement, Buturlinovsky District, Voronezh Oblast, Russia. The population was 347 as of 2010. There are 5 streets.

== Geography ==
Chernavka is located 30 km southwest of Buturlinovka (the district's administrative centre) by road. Puzevo is the nearest rural locality.
