= Nikolskoye 1-ye, Paninsky District, Voronezh Oblast =

Nikolskoye 1-ye Никольское 1-е
- Settlement
- Location within Voronezh Oblast Location within Russia
- Coordinates: 51°43′N 40°04′E
- Country: Russia
- Region: Voronezh Oblast
- District: Paninsky District
- Time zone: UTC+3:00

Nikolskoye 1-ye (Russian: Никольское 1-е) is a rural locality (a settlement) in Dmitriyevskoye Rural Settlement, Paninsky District, Voronezh Oblast, Russia. The population was 52 as of 2010. There are 2 streets.

== Geography ==
Nikolskoye 1-ye is located on the right bank of the Pravaya Khava River, 20 km north of Panino (the district's administrative centre) by road. Dmitriyevka is the nearest rural locality.
