= Goryushkin =

Goryushkin Горюшкин
- Khutor
- Location within Voronezh Oblast Location within Russia
- Coordinates: 50°34′N 41°04′E
- Country: Russia
- Region: Voronezh Oblast
- District: Vorobyovsky District
- Time zone: UTC+3:00

Goryushkin (Russian: Горюшкин) is a rural locality (a khutor) in Nikolskoye 1-ye Rural Settlement, Vorobyovsky District, Voronezh Oblast, Russia. The population was 64 as of 2010.

== Geography ==
Goryushkin is located 17 km southeast of Vorobyovka (the district's administrative centre) by road. Nikolskoye 1-ye is the nearest rural locality.
