= Uchastok No. 4 =

Uchastok №4 Участок № 4
- Settlement
- Location within Voronezh Oblast Location within Russia
- Coordinates: 51°08′N 40°54′E
- Country: Russia
- Region: Voronezh Oblast
- District: Talovsky District
- Time zone: UTC+3:00

Uchastok №4 (Russian: Участок № 4) is a rural locality (a settlement) in Shaninskoye Rural Settlement, Talovsky District, Voronezh Oblast, Russia. The population was 216 as of 2010. There are 7 streets.
