= Kuchugury, Voronezh Oblast =

Kuchugury Кучугуры
- Selo
- Location within Voronezh Oblast Location within Russia
- Coordinates: 51°35′N 38°19′E
- Country: Russia
- Region: Voronezh Oblast
- District: Nizhnedevitsky District
- Time zone: UTC+3:00

Kuchugury (Russian: Кучугуры) is a rural locality (a selo) in Kuchugurovskoye Rural Settlement, Nizhnedevitsky District, Voronezh Oblast, Russia. The population was 475 as of 2010. There are 4 streets.

== Geography ==
Kuchugury is located 10 km north of Nizhnedevitsk (the district's administrative centre) by road. Log is the nearest rural locality.
