= Malinovka, Verkhnekhavsky District, Voronezh Oblast =

Malinovka Малиновка
- Settlement
- Location within Voronezh Oblast Location within Russia
- Coordinates: 51°52′N 39°51′E
- Country: Russia
- Region: Voronezh Oblast
- District: Verkhnekhavsky District
- Time zone: UTC+3:00

Malinovka (Russian: Малиновка) is a rural locality (a settlement) in Spasskoye Rural Settlement, Verkhnekhavsky District, Voronezh Oblast, Russia. The population was 153 as of 2010. There are 2 streets.

== Geography ==
Malinovka is located 9 km northwest of Verkhnyaya Khava (the district's administrative centre) by road. Vishnyovka is the nearest rural locality.
