= Kondrashkino =

Kondrashkino Кондрашкино
- Selo
- Location within Voronezh Oblast Location within Russia
- Coordinates: 51°23′N 39°40′E
- Country: Russia
- Region: Voronezh Oblast
- District: Kashirsky District
- Time zone: UTC+3:00

Kondrashkino (Russian: Кондрашкино) is a rural locality (a selo) and the administrative center of Kondrashkinskoye Rural Settlement, Kashirsky District, Voronezh Oblast, Russia. The population was 597 as of 2010. There are 7 streets.

== Geography ==
Kondrashkino is located 7 km east of Kashirskoye (the district's administrative centre) by road. Kashirskoye is the nearest rural locality.
