= Grushevaya Polyana =

Grushevaya Polyana Грушевая Поляна
- Settlement
- Location within Voronezh Oblast Location within Russia
- Coordinates: 50°50′N 38°56′E
- Country: Russia
- Region: Voronezh Oblast
- District: Ostrogozhsky District
- Time zone: UTC+3:00

Grushevaya Polyana (Russian: Грушевая Поляна) is a rural locality (a settlement) in Shubinskoye Rural Settlement, Ostrogozhsky District, Voronezh Oblast, Russia. The population was 276 as of 2010. There are 2 streets.

== Geography ==
Grushevaya Polyana is located 11 km west of Ostrogozhsk (the district's administrative centre) by road. Gubarevka is the nearest rural locality.
