= Morozovka, Podgorensky District, Voronezh Oblast =

Morozovka Морозовка
- Khutor
- Location within Voronezh Oblast Location within Russia
- Coordinates: 50°27′N 39°53′E
- Country: Russia
- Region: Voronezh Oblast
- District: Podgorensky District
- Time zone: UTC+3:00

Morozovka (Russian: Моро́зовка) is a rural locality (a khutor) in Beloroyevskoye Rural Settlement, Podgorensky District, Voronezh Oblast, Russia. The population was 107 as of 2010. There are 4 streets.

== Geography ==
Morozovka is located 24 km northeast of Podgorensky (the district's administrative centre) by road. Vitebsk is the nearest rural locality.
