= Dalneye Lyapino =

Dalneye Lyapino Дальнее Ляпино
- Selo
- Location within Voronezh Oblast Location within Russia
- Coordinates: 51°40′N 38°53′E
- Country: Russia
- Region: Voronezh Oblast
- District: Semiluksky District
- Time zone: UTC+3:00

Dalneye Lyapino (Russian: Дальнее Ляпино) is a rural locality (a selo) in Latnenskoye Rural Settlement, Semiluksky District, Voronezh Oblast, Russia. The population was 247 as of 2010. There are 2 streets.

== Geography ==
Dalneye Lyapino is located on the Gnilusha River, 14 km southwest of Semiluki (the district's administrative centre) by road. Latnaya is the nearest rural locality.
