= Saprino =

Saprino Саприно
- Selo
- Location within Voronezh Oblast Location within Russia
- Coordinates: 50°22′N 39°53′E
- Country: Russia
- Region: Voronezh Oblast
- District: Podgorensky District
- Time zone: UTC+3:00

Saprino (Russian: Саприно) is a rural locality (a selo) in Vitebskoye Rural Settlement, Podgorensky District, Voronezh Oblast, Russia. The population was 447 as of 2010. There are 11 streets.

== Geography ==
Saprino is located 24 km east of Podgorensky (the district's administrative centre) by road. Kurennoye is the nearest rural locality.
