= Tereshkovo =

Tereshkovo Терешково
- Selo
- Location within Voronezh Oblast Location within Russia
- Coordinates: 49°55′N 40°39′E
- Country: Russia
- Region: Voronezh Oblast
- District: Bogucharsky District
- Time zone: UTC+3:00

Tereshkovo (Russian: Терешково) is a rural locality (a selo) in Dyachenkovskoye Rural Settlement, Bogucharsky District, Voronezh Oblast, Russia. The population was 624 as of 2010. There are 12 streets.

== Geography ==
Tereshkovo is located 13 km east of Boguchar (the district's administrative centre) by road. Dyachenkovo is the nearest rural locality.
