= Mokhovatka =

Mokhovatka Моховатка
- Village
- Location within Voronezh Oblast Location within Russia
- Coordinates: 51°52′N 39°10′E
- Country: Russia
- Region: Voronezh Oblast
- District: Ramonsky District
- Time zone: UTC+3:00

Mokhovatka (Russian: Моховатка) is a rural locality (a village) in Novozhivotinnovskoye Rural Settlement, Ramonsky District, Voronezh Oblast, Russia. The population was 167 as of 2010. There are 6 streets.

== Geography ==
Mokhovatka is located 18 km southwest of Ramon (the district's administrative centre) by road. Novozhivotinnoye is the nearest rural locality.
