= Zaliman =

Zaliman Залиман
- Selo
- Location within Voronezh Oblast Location within Russia
- Coordinates: 49°56′N 40°34′E
- Country: Russia
- Region: Voronezh Oblast
- District: Bogucharsky District
- Time zone: UTC+3:00

Zaliman (Russian: Залиман) is a rural locality (a selo) and the administrative center of Zalimanskoye Rural Settlement, Bogucharsky District, Voronezh Oblast, Russia. The population was 2,569 as of 2010. There are 41 streets.

== Geography ==
Zaliman is located 2 km northeast of Boguchar (the district's administrative centre) by road. Boguchar is the nearest rural locality.
