= Koleshchatovka =

Koleshchatovka Колещатовка
- Selo
- Location within Voronezh Oblast Location within Russia
- Coordinates: 49°34′N 39°53′E
- Country: Russia
- Region: Voronezh Oblast
- District: Kantemirovsky District
- Time zone: UTC+3:00

Koleshchatovka (Russian: Колещатовка) is a rural locality (a selo) in Bugayevskoye Rural Settlement, Kantemirovsky District, Voronezh Oblast, Russia. The population was 308 as of 2010. There are 2 streets.

== Geography ==
Koleshchatovka is located 15 km south of Kantemirovka (the district's administrative centre) by road. Kantemirovka is the nearest rural locality.
