= Petino =

Petino Петино
- Selo
- Location within Voronezh Oblast Location within Russia
- Coordinates: 51°35′N 38°59′E
- Country: Russia
- Region: Voronezh Oblast
- District: Khokholsky District
- Time zone: UTC+3:00

Petino (Russian: Петино) is a rural locality (a selo) and the administrative center of Petinskoye Rural Settlement, Khokholsky District, Voronezh Oblast, Russia. The population was 937 as of 2010. There are 12 streets.

== Geography ==
Petino is located on the right bank of the Don River, 27 km east of Khokholsky (the district's administrative centre) by road. Orlovka is the nearest rural locality.
