= Chapayevskoye =

Chapayevskoye Чапаевское
- Settlement
- Location within Voronezh Oblast Location within Russia
- Coordinates: 51°49′N 40°42′E
- Country: Russia
- Region: Voronezh Oblast
- District: Ertilsky District
- Time zone: UTC+3:00

Chapayevskoye (Russian: Чапаевское) is a rural locality (a settlement) in Ertil, Ertilsky District, Voronezh Oblast, Russia. The population was 98 as of 2010. There are 2 streets.

== Geography ==
Chapayevskoye is located 6 km west of Ertil (the district's administrative centre) by road. Ertil is the nearest rural locality.
