= Galsky =

Galsky Гальский
- Khutor
- Location within Voronezh Oblast Location within Russia
- Coordinates: 50°21′N 39°35′E
- Country: Russia
- Region: Voronezh Oblast
- District: Podgorensky District
- Time zone: UTC+3:00

Galsky (Russian: Га́льский) is a rural locality (a khutor) in Skororybskoye Rural Settlement, Podgorensky District, Voronezh Oblast, Russia. The population was 77 as of 2010.

== Geography ==
Galsky is located 8 km southwest of Podgorensky (the district's administrative centre) by road, on the Sukhaya Rossosh River. Petropavlovka is the nearest rural locality.
