= Ivchenkovo =

Ivchenkovo Ивченково
- Khutor
- Location within Voronezh Oblast Location within Russia
- Coordinates: 50°40′36″N 39°33′03″E
- Country: Russia
- Region: Voronezh Oblast
- District: Kamensky District
- Time zone: UTC+3:00

Ivchenkovo (Russian: Ивченково) is a rural locality (a khutor) in Sonchinskoye Rural Settlement, Kamensky District, Voronezh Oblast, Russia. The population was 92 as of 2010. There are 5 streets.

== Geography ==
Ivchenkovo is located 11 km southeast of Kamenka (the district's administrative centre) by road. Molchanovo is the nearest rural locality.
