= Lebed-Sergeyevka =

Lebed-Sergeyevka Лебедь-Сергеевка
- Selo
- Location within Voronezh Oblast Location within Russia
- Coordinates: 50°03′N 39°45′E
- Country: Russia
- Region: Voronezh Oblast
- District: Rossoshansky District
- Time zone: UTC+3:00

Lebed-Sergeyevka (Russian: Лебедь-Сергеевка) is a rural locality (a selo) in Morozovskoye Rural Settlement, Rossoshansky District, Voronezh Oblast, Russia. The population was 121 as of 2010.

== Geography ==
Lebed-Sergeyevka is located 34 km southeast of Rossosh (the district's administrative centre) by road. Krinichnoye is the nearest rural locality.
