= Pokrovka, Ostrogozhsky District, Voronezh Oblast =

Pokrovka Покровка
- Selo
- Location within Voronezh Oblast Location within Russia
- Coordinates: 50°58′N 39°10′E
- Country: Russia
- Region: Voronezh Oblast
- District: Ostrogozhsky District
- Time zone: UTC+3:00

Pokrovka (Russian: Покровка) is a rural locality (a selo) in Korotoyakskoye Rural Settlement, Ostrogozhsky District, Voronezh Oblast, Russia. The population was 1,746 as of 2010. There are 23 streets.
