= Sredne-Voskresenskoye =

Sredne-Voskresenskoye Средне-Воскресенское
- Selo
- Location within Voronezh Oblast Location within Russia
- Coordinates: 50°53′N 39°10′E
- Country: Russia
- Region: Voronezh Oblast
- District: Ostrogozhsky District
- Time zone: UTC+3:00

Sredne-Voskresenskoye (Russian: Средне-Воскресенское) is a rural locality (a selo) in Krinichenskoye Rural Settlement, Ostrogozhsky District, Voronezh Oblast, Russia. The population was 72 as of 2010. There are 8 streets.

== Geography ==
Sredne-Voskresenskoye is located 18 km northeast of Ostrogozhsk (the district's administrative centre) by road. Rybnoye is the nearest rural locality.
