= Mikhaylovka 1-ya =

Mikhaylovka 1-ya Михайловка 1-я
- Selo
- Location within Voronezh Oblast Location within Russia
- Coordinates: 51°38′N 40°22′E
- Country: Russia
- Region: Voronezh Oblast
- District: Paninsky District
- Time zone: UTC+3:00

Mikhaylovka 1-ya (Russian: Михайловка 1-я) is a rural locality (a selo) and the administrative center of Progressovskoye Rural Settlement, Paninsky District, Voronezh Oblast, Russia. The population was 607 as of 2010. There are 9 streets.

== Geography ==
Mikhaylovka 1-ya is located 21 km east of Panino (the district's administrative centre) by road. Maryevka is the nearest rural locality.
