= Nikolayevka, Ternovsky District, Voronezh Oblast =

Nikolayevka Николаевка
- Selo
- Location within Voronezh Oblast Location within Russia
- Coordinates: 51°43′N 41°13′E
- Country: Russia
- Region: Voronezh Oblast
- District: Ternovsky District
- Time zone: UTC+3:00

Nikolayevka (Russian: Николаевка) is a rural locality (a selo) in Tambovskoye Rural Settlement, Ternovsky District, Voronezh Oblast, Russia. The population was 322 as of 2010. There are 5 streets.
