= Tsentralnaya Usadba sovkhoza Pugachyovsky =

Tsentralnaya Usadba sovkhoza Pugachyovsky Центральная Усадьба совхоза «Пугачёвский»
- Settlement
- Location within Voronezh Oblast Location within Russia
- Coordinates: 51°34′N 40°43′E
- Country: Russia
- Region: Voronezh Oblast
- District: Anninsky District
- Time zone: UTC+3:00

Tsentralnaya Usadba sovkhoza Pugachyovsky (Russian: Центральная Усадьба совхоза «Пугачёвский») is a rural locality (a settlement) and the administrative center of Pugachyovskoye Rural Settlement, Anninsky District, Voronezh Oblast, Russia. The population was 743 as of 2010. There are 10 streets.

== Geography ==
The settlement is located 25 km northeast of Anna (the district's administrative centre) by road. Posyolok Oktyabrskogo otdeleniya sovkhoza Pugachyovsky is the nearest rural locality.
