= Serikovo =

Serikovo Сериково
- Selo
- Location within Voronezh Oblast Location within Russia
- Coordinates: 50°57′N 40°52′E
- Country: Russia
- Region: Voronezh Oblast
- District: Buturlinovsky District
- Time zone: UTC+3:00

Serikovo (Russian: Сериково) is a rural locality (a selo) and the administrative center of Serikovskoye Rural Settlement, Buturlinovsky District, Voronezh Oblast, Russia. The population was 435 as of 2010. There are 6 streets.

== Geography ==
Serikovo is located 33 km northeast of Buturlinovka (the district's administrative centre) by road. Makogonovo is the nearest rural locality.
