= Grinyov =

Grinyov Гринёв
- Khutor
- Location within Voronezh Oblast Location within Russia
- Coordinates: 50°36′N 40°45′E
- Country: Russia
- Region: Voronezh Oblast
- District: Vorobyovsky District
- Time zone: UTC+3:00

Grinyov (Russian: Гринёв) is a rural locality (a khutor) in Solonetskoye Rural Settlement, Vorobyovsky District, Voronezh Oblast, Russia. The population was 229 as of 2010. There are 3 streets.

== Geography ==
Grinyov is located 23 km west of Vorobyovka (the district's administrative centre) by road. Solontsy is the nearest rural locality.
