= Fomenkovo =

Fomenkovo Фоменково
- Selo
- Location within Voronezh Oblast Location within Russia
- Coordinates: 50°05′N 41°03′E
- Country: Russia
- Region: Voronezh Oblast
- District: Petropavlovsky District
- Time zone: UTC+3:00

Fomenkovo (Russian: Фоменково) is a rural locality (a selo) in Novotroitskoye Rural Settlement, Petropavlovsky District, Voronezh Oblast, Russia. The population was 277 as of 2010. There are 6 streets.

== Geography ==
Fomenkovo is located 21 km east of Petropavlovka (the district's administrative centre) by road. Novotroitskoye is the nearest rural locality.
