= Nizhnemaryino =

Nizhnemaryino Нижнемарьино
- Selo
- Location within Voronezh Oblast Location within Russia
- Coordinates: 51°13′N 39°29′E
- Country: Russia
- Region: Voronezh Oblast
- District: Liskinsky District
- Time zone: UTC+3:00

Nizhnemaryino (Russian: Нижнемарьино) is a rural locality (a selo) in Tresorukovskoye Rural Settlement, Liskinsky District, Voronezh Oblast, Russia. The population was 1,190 as of 2010. There are 11 streets.

== Geography ==
Nizhnemaryino is located 33 km north of Liski (the district's administrative centre) by road. Tresorukovo is the nearest rural locality.
