= Bolshoy Skororyb =

Bolshoy Skororyb Большой Скорорыб
- Khutor
- Location within Voronezh Oblast Location within Russia
- Coordinates: 50°24′N 39°29′E
- Country: Russia
- Region: Voronezh Oblast
- District: Podgorensky District
- Time zone: UTC+3:00

Bolshoy Skororyb (Russian: Большо́й Скорорыб) is a rural locality (a khutor) and the administrative center of Skororybskoye Rural Settlement, Podgorensky District, Voronezh Oblast, Russia. The population was 573 as of 2010. There are 8 streets.

== Geography ==
Bolshoy Skororyb is located 16 km west of Podgorensky (the district's administrative centre) by road. Samoylenko is the nearest rural locality.
