= Dankovsky, Voronezh Oblast =

Dankovsky Даньковский
- Khutor
- Location within Voronezh Oblast Location within Russia
- Coordinates: 50°31′N 39°40′E
- Country: Russia
- Region: Voronezh Oblast
- District: Podgorensky District
- Time zone: UTC+3:00

Dankovsky (Russian: Данько́вский) is a rural locality (a khutor) in Bolshedmitrovskoye Rural Settlement, Podgorensky District, Voronezh Oblast, Russia. The population was 156 as of 2010.

== Geography ==
Dankovsky is located 14 km north of Podgorensky (the district's administrative centre) by road. Krasyukovsky is the nearest rural locality.
