= Atamanovka, Rossoshansky District, Voronezh Oblast =

Atamanovka Атамановка
- Khutor
- Location within Voronezh Oblast Location within Russia
- Coordinates: 49°55′N 39°57′E
- Country: Russia
- Region: Voronezh Oblast
- District: Rossoshansky District
- Time zone: UTC+3:00

Atamanovka (Russian: Атамановка) is a rural locality (a khutor) in Krinichanskoye Rural Settlement, Rossoshansky District, Voronezh Oblast, Russia. The population was 53 as of 2010. There are 2 streets.

== Geography ==
Atamanovka is located 58 km southeast of Rossosh (the district's administrative centre) by road. Pervomayskoye is the nearest rural locality.
