= Uchastok No. 28 =

Uchastok №28 Участок № 28
- Settlement
- Location within Voronezh Oblast Location within Russia
- Coordinates: 51°10′N 40°53′E
- Country: Russia
- Region: Voronezh Oblast
- District: Talovsky District
- Time zone: UTC+3:00

Uchastok №28 (Russian: Участок № 28) is a rural locality (a settlement) in Shaninskoye Rural Settlement, Talovsky District, Voronezh Oblast, Russia. The population was 216 as of 2010. There are 3 streets.

== Geography ==
Uchastok №28 is located 18 km northeast of Talovaya (the district's administrative centre) by road. Uchastok №4 is the nearest rural locality.
