= Lizinovka =

Lizinovka Лизиновка
- Selo
- Location within Voronezh Oblast Location within Russia
- Coordinates: 50°07′N 39°27′E
- Country: Russia
- Region: Voronezh Oblast
- District: Rossoshansky District
- Time zone: UTC+3:00

Lizinovka (Russian: Лизиновка) is a rural locality (a selo) and the administrative center of Lizinovskoye Rural Settlement, Rossoshansky District, Voronezh Oblast, Russia. The population was 1,239 as of 2010. There are 7 streets.

== Geography ==
Lizinovka is located 15 km southwest of Rossosh (the district's administrative centre) by road. Yekaterinovka is the nearest rural locality.
