= Serebryanka, Voronezh Oblast =

Serebryanka Серебрянка
- Selo
- Location within Voronezh Oblast Location within Russia
- Coordinates: 51°51′N 38°44′E
- Country: Russia
- Region: Voronezh Oblast
- District: Semiluksky District
- Time zone: UTC+3:00

Serebryanka (Russian: Серебрянка) is a rural locality (a selo) in Zemlyanskoye Rural Settlement, Semiluksky District, Voronezh Oblast, Russia. The population was 573 as of 2010. There are 5 streets.

== Geography ==
Serebryanka is located 34 km northwest of Semiluki (the district's administrative centre) by road. Zemlyansk is the nearest rural locality.
