= Zasosna, Voronezh Oblast =

Zasosna Засосна
- Khutor
- Location within Voronezh Oblast Location within Russia
- Coordinates: 50°46′N 38°58′E
- Country: Russia
- Region: Voronezh Oblast
- District: Ostrogozhsky District
- Time zone: UTC+3:00

Zasosna (Russian: Засосна) is a rural locality (a khutor) in Olshanskoye Rural Settlement, Ostrogozhsky District, Voronezh Oblast, Russia. The population was 78 as of 2010. There are 2 streets.

== Geography ==
Zasosna is located 19 km southwest of Ostrogozhsk (the district's administrative centre) by road. Nizhny Olshan is the nearest rural locality.
