= Troynya =

Troynya Тройня
- Selo
- Location within Voronezh Oblast Location within Russia
- Coordinates: 51°02′N 40°25′E
- Country: Russia
- Region: Voronezh Oblast
- District: Bobrovsky District
- Time zone: UTC+3:00

Troynya (Russian: Тройня) is a rural locality (a selo) and the administrative center of Troynyanskoye Rural Settlement, Bobrovsky District, Voronezh Oblast, Russia. The population was 153 as of 2010. There are three streets in the village.

== Geography ==
Troynya is located 31 km southeast of Bobrov (the district's administrative centre) by road. Orlovka is the nearest rural locality.
