= Privolye, Voronezh Oblast =

Privolye Приволье
- Selo
- Location within Voronezh Oblast Location within Russia
- Coordinates: 51°48′N 38°56′E
- Country: Russia
- Region: Voronezh Oblast
- District: Semiluksky District
- Time zone: UTC+3:00

Privolye (Russian: Приволье) is a rural locality (a selo) in Medvezhenskoye Rural Settlement, Semiluksky District, Voronezh Oblast, Russia. The population was 51 as of 2010. There are 3 streets.

== Geography ==
Privolye is located on the Kamyshovka River, 20 km northwest of Semiluki (the district's administrative centre) by road. Razdolye is the nearest rural locality.
