= Rybalchino =

Rybalchino Рыбальчино
- Khutor
- Location within Voronezh Oblast Location within Russia
- Coordinates: 50°45′N 39°26′E
- Country: Russia
- Region: Voronezh Oblast
- District: Kamensky District
- Time zone: UTC+3:00

Rybalchino (Russian: Рыбальчино) is a rural locality (a khutor) in Volchanskoye Rural Settlement, Kamensky District, Voronezh Oblast, Russia. The population was 116 as of 2010.

== Geography ==
Rybalchino is located 25 km north of Kamenka (the district's administrative centre) by road. Yevdakovo is the nearest rural locality.
