= Morozovka, Kalacheyevsky District, Voronezh Oblast =

Morozovka Морозовка
- Khutor
- Location within Voronezh Oblast Location within Russia
- Coordinates: 50°23′N 40°34′E
- Country: Russia
- Region: Voronezh Oblast
- District: Kalacheyevsky District
- Time zone: UTC+3:00

Morozovka (Russian: Морозовка) is a rural locality (a khutor) in Semyonovskoye Rural Settlement, Kalacheyevsky District, Voronezh Oblast, Russia. The population was 135 as of 2010. There are 3 streets.

== Geography ==
Morozovka is located 38 km west of Kalach (the district's administrative centre) by road. Semyonovka is the nearest rural locality.
