= Boldyrevka, Voronezh Oblast =

Boldyrevka Болдыревка
- Selo
- Location within Voronezh Oblast Location within Russia
- Coordinates: 51°07′N 39°03′E
- Country: Russia
- Region: Voronezh Oblast
- District: Ostrogozhsky District
- Time zone: UTC+3:00

Boldyrevka (Russian: Болдыревка) is a rural locality (a selo) and the administrative center of Boldyrevskoye Rural Settlement, Ostrogozhsky District, Voronezh Oblast, Russia. The population was 496 as of 2010. There are 7 streets.

== Geography ==
Boldyrevka is located 35 km north of Ostrogozhsk (the district's administrative centre) by road. Novo-Uspenka is the nearest rural locality.
