= Kuznetsovsky, Voronezh Oblast =

Kuznetsovsky Кузнецовский
- Settlement
- Location within Voronezh Oblast Location within Russia
- Coordinates: 49°42′N 40°18′E
- Country: Russia
- Region: Voronezh Oblast
- District: Kantemirovsky District
- Time zone: UTC+3:00

Kuznetsovsky (Russian: Кузнецовский) is a rural locality (a settlement) in Osikovskoye Rural Settlement, Kantemirovsky District, Voronezh Oblast, Russia. The population was 311 as of 2010. There are 2 streets.

== Geography ==
Kuznetsovsky is located 41 km east of Kantemirovka (the district's administrative centre) by road. Osikovka is the nearest rural locality.
