= Melakhino =

Melakhino Мелахино
- Selo
- Location within Voronezh Oblast Location within Russia
- Coordinates: 50°51′N 39°20′E
- Country: Russia
- Region: Voronezh Oblast
- District: Liskinsky District
- Time zone: UTC+3:00

Melakhino (Russian: Мелахино) is a rural locality (a selo) in Kovalyovskoye Rural Settlement, Liskinsky District, Voronezh Oblast, Russia. The population was 61 as of 2010. There are 2 streets.

== Geography ==
Melakhino is located 35 km southwest of Liski (the district's administrative centre) by road. Misevo is the nearest rural locality.
