= Druzhelyubiye =

Druzhelyubiye Дружелюбие
- Selo
- Location within Voronezh Oblast Location within Russia
- Coordinates: 51°32′N 39°31′E
- Country: Russia
- Region: Voronezh Oblast
- District: Novousmansky District
- Time zone: UTC+3:00

Druzhelyubiye (Russian: Дружелюбие) is a rural locality (a selo) in Rogachyovskoye Rural Settlement, Novousmansky District, Voronezh Oblast, Russia. The population was 204 as of 2010.

== Geography ==
Druzhelyubiye is located 17 km southeast of Novaya Usman (the district's administrative centre) by road. Tamlyk is the nearest rural locality.
