= Gorokhovka, Verkhnemamonsky District, Voronezh Oblast =

Gorokhovka Гороховка
- Selo
- Location within Voronezh Oblast Location within Russia
- Coordinates: 50°06′N 40°10′E
- Country: Russia
- Region: Voronezh Oblast
- District: Verkhnemamonsky District
- Time zone: UTC+3:00

Gorokhovka (Russian: Гороховка) is a rural locality (a selo) and the administrative center of Gorokhovskoye Rural Settlement, Verkhnemamonsky District, Voronezh Oblast, Russia. The population was 1,284 as of 2010. There are 15 streets.

== Geography ==
Gorokhovka is located 19 km southwest of Verkhny Mamon (the district's administrative centre) by road. Derezovka is the nearest rural locality.
