= Yesipovo, Voronezh Oblast =

Yesipovo Есипово
- Settlement
- Location within Voronezh Oblast Location within Russia
- Coordinates: 51°45′N 41°31′E
- Country: Russia
- Region: Voronezh Oblast
- District: Ternovsky District
- Time zone: UTC+3:00

Yesipovo (Russian: Есипово) is a rural locality (a settlement) and the administrative center of Yesipovskoye Rural Settlement, Ternovsky District, Voronezh Oblast, Russia. The population was 1,620 as of 2010. There are 15 streets.

== Geography ==
Yesipovo is located 15 km northwest of Ternovka (the district's administrative centre) by road. Polyana is the nearest rural locality.
