= Posyolok 3-go uchastka instituta imeni Dokuchayeva =

Posyolok 3-go uchastka instituta imeni Dokuchayeva Посёлок 3-го участка института имени Докучаева
- Settlement
- Location within Voronezh Oblast Location within Russia
- Coordinates: 51°02′N 40°42′E
- Country: Russia
- Region: Voronezh Oblast
- District: Talovsky District
- Time zone: UTC+3:00

Posyolok 3-go uchastka instituta imeni Dokuchayeva (Russian: Посёлок 3-го участка института имени Докучаева) is a rural locality (a settlement) in Kamenno-Stepnoye Rural Settlement, Talovsky District, Voronezh Oblast, Russia. The population was 359 as of 2010. There are 4 streets.

== Geography ==
It is located 9 km south of Talovaya (the district's administrative centre) by road. Posyolok 2-go uchastka instituta imeni Dokuchayeva is the nearest rural locality.
