= Kozlovka, Buturlinovsky District, Voronezh Oblast =

Kozlovka Козловка
- Selo
- Location within Voronezh Oblast Location within Russia
- Coordinates: 50°51′N 40°27′E
- Country: Russia
- Region: Voronezh Oblast
- District: Buturlinovsky District
- Time zone: UTC+3:00

Kozlovka (Russian: Козловка) is a rural locality (a selo) and the administrative center of Kozlovskoye Rural Settlement, Buturlinovsky District, Voronezh Oblast, Russia. The population was 3,137 as of 2010. There are 41 streets.

== Geography ==
Kozlovka is located 13 km northwest of Buturlinovka (the district's administrative centre) by road. Zemledelets is the nearest rural locality.
