= Posyolok sovkhoza 2-ya Pyatiletka =

Posyolok sovkhoza 2-ya Pyatiletka Посёлок совхоза «2-я Пятилетка»
- Khutor
- Location within Voronezh Oblast Location within Russia
- Coordinates: 51°04′N 39°32′E
- Country: Russia
- Region: Voronezh Oblast
- District: Liskinsky District
- Time zone: UTC+3:00

Posyolok sovkhoza 2-ya Pyatiletka (Russian: Посёлок совхоза «2-я Пятилетка») is a rural locality (a khutor) and the administrative center of Stepnyanskoye Rural Settlement, Liskinsky District, Voronezh Oblast, Russia. The population was 1,161 as of 2010. There are 17 streets.

== Geography ==
It is located 15 km north of Liski (the district's administrative centre) by road. Vysokoye is the nearest rural locality.
