= Malye Alabukhi 1-ye =

Malye Alabukhi 1-ye Малые Алабухи 1-е
- Selo
- Location within Voronezh Oblast Location within Russia
- Coordinates: 51°33′N 42°09′E
- Country: Russia
- Region: Voronezh Oblast
- District: Gribanovsky District
- Time zone: UTC+3:00

Malye Alabukhi 1-ye (Russian: Ма́лые Ала́бухи 1-е) is a rural locality (a selo) and the administrative center of Maloabukhskoye Rural Settlement, Gribanovsky District, Voronezh Oblast, Russia. The population was 974 as of 2010. There are 9 streets.

== Geography ==
Malye Alabukhi 1-ye is located 22 km northeast of Gribanovsky (the district's administrative centre) by road. Malye Abukhi 2-ye is the nearest rural locality.
