= Kopanaya 2-ya =

Kopanaya 2-ya Копаная 2-я
- Sloboda
- Location within Voronezh Oblast Location within Russia
- Coordinates: 50°26′N 39°04′E
- Country: Russia
- Region: Voronezh Oblast
- District: Olkhovatsky District
- Time zone: UTC+3:00

Kopanaya 2-ya (Russian: Копаная 2-я) is a rural locality (a sloboda) in Kopanyanskoye Rural Settlement, Olkhovatsky District, Voronezh Oblast, Russia. The population was 90 as of 2010. There are 2 streets.
