= Novenky, Talovsky District, Voronezh Oblast =

Novenky Новенький
- Khutor
- Location within Voronezh Oblast Location within Russia
- Coordinates: 51°08′N 40°45′E
- Country: Russia
- Region: Voronezh Oblast
- District: Talovsky District
- Time zone: UTC+3:00

Novenky (Russian: Новенький) is a rural locality (a khutor) in Alexandrovskoye Rural Settlement, Talovsky District, Voronezh Oblast, Russia. The population was 364 as of 2010. There are 3 streets.

== Geography ==
Novenky is located 8 km northeast of Talovaya (the district's administrative centre) by road. Svetly is the nearest rural locality.
