= Mikhinsky =

Mikhinsky Михинский
- Settlement
- Location within Voronezh Oblast Location within Russia
- Coordinates: 50°59′N 40°42′E
- Country: Russia
- Region: Voronezh Oblast
- District: Talovsky District
- Time zone: UTC+3:00

Mikhinsky (Russian: Михинский) is a rural locality (a settlement) in Kamenno-Stepnoye Rural Settlement, Talovsky District, Voronezh Oblast, Russia. The population was 613 as of 2010. There are 5 streets.
