= Degtyarnoye =

Degtyarnoye Дегтярное
- Selo
- Location within Voronezh Oblast Location within Russia
- Coordinates: 50°38′N 39°16′E
- Country: Russia
- Region: Voronezh Oblast
- District: Kamensky District
- Time zone: UTC+3:00

Degtyarnoye (Russian: Дегтярное) is a rural locality (a selo) and the administrative center of Degtyarenskoye Rural Settlement, Kamensky District, Voronezh Oblast, Russia. The population was 406 as of 2010. There are 6 streets.

== Geography ==
Degtyarnoye is located 17 km southwest of Kamenka (the district's administrative centre) by road. Khvoshchevaty is the nearest rural locality.
