= Yelenovka, Voronezh Oblast =

Yelenovka Еленовка
- Selo
- Location within Voronezh Oblast Location within Russia
- Coordinates: 49°56′N 39°27′E
- Country: Russia
- Region: Voronezh Oblast
- District: Rossoshansky District
- Time zone: UTC+3:00

Yelenovka (Russian: Еленовка) is a rural locality (a selo) in Shramovskoye Rural Settlement, Rossoshansky District, Voronezh Oblast, Russia. The population was 350 as of 2010. There are 6 streets.
