= Serpanki =

Serpanki Серпанки
- Khutor
- Location within Voronezh Oblast Location within Russia
- Coordinates: 50°25′N 39°33′E
- Country: Russia
- Region: Voronezh Oblast
- District: Podgorensky District
- Time zone: UTC+3:00

Serpanki (Russian: Серпанки) is a rural locality (a khutor) in Grishevskoye Rural Settlement, Podgorensky District, Voronezh Oblast, Russia. The population was 105 as of 2010. There are 2 streets.

== Geography ==
Serpanki is located 15 km northwest of Podgorensky (the district's administrative centre) by road. Peschany is the nearest rural locality.
