= Kazanskaya Khava =

Kazanskaya Khava Казанская Хава
- Selo
- Location within Voronezh Oblast Location within Russia
- Coordinates: 51°34′N 39°43′E
- Country: Russia
- Region: Voronezh Oblast
- District: Novousmansky District
- Time zone: UTC+3:00

Kazanskaya Khava (Russian: Казанская Хава) is a rural locality (a selo) in Timiryazevskoye Rural Settlement, Novousmansky District, Voronezh Oblast, Russia. The population was 126 as of 2010. There are 3 streets.

== Geography ==
Kazanskaya Khava is located 27 km southeast of Novaya Usman (the district's administrative centre) by road. Timiryazevo is the nearest rural locality.
