= Malorechensky 2-y =

Malorechensky 2-y Малореченский 2-й
- Settlement
- Location within Voronezh Oblast Location within Russia
- Coordinates: 51°40′N 40°56′E
- Country: Russia
- Region: Voronezh Oblast
- District: Ertilsky District
- Time zone: UTC+3:00

Malorechensky 2-y (Russian: Малореченский 2-й) is a rural locality (a settlement) in Buravtsovskoye Rural Settlement, Ertilsky District, Voronezh Oblast, Russia. The population was 98 as of 2010. There are 2 streets.

== Geography ==
Malorechensky 2-y is located 27 km southeast of Ertil (the district's administrative centre) by road. Kopyl is the nearest rural locality.
