= Lipovka, Voronezh Oblast =

Lipovka Липовка
- Selo
- Location within Voronezh Oblast Location within Russia
- Coordinates: 50°51′N 40°01′E
- Country: Russia
- Region: Voronezh Oblast
- District: Bobrovsky District
- Time zone: UTC+3:00

Lipovka (Russian: Липовка) is a rural locality (a selo) and the administrative center of Lipovskoye Rural Settlement, Bobrovsky District, Voronezh Oblast, Russia. The population was 803 as of 2010. There are 14 streets.

== Geography ==
Lipovka is located 49 km south of Bobrov (the district's administrative centre) by road. Shestakovo is the nearest rural locality.
