= Kvashino =

Kvashino Квашино
- Selo
- Location within Voronezh Oblast Location within Russia
- Coordinates: 50°38′N 40°49′E
- Country: Russia
- Region: Voronezh Oblast
- District: Vorobyovsky District
- Time zone: UTC+3:00

Kvashino (Russian: Квашино) is a rural locality (a selo) in Solonetskoye Rural Settlement, Vorobyovsky District, Voronezh Oblast, Russia. The population was 429 as of 2010. There are 5 streets.

== Geography ==
Kvashino is located 9 km west of Vorobyovka (the district's administrative centre) by road. Pervomaysky is the nearest rural locality.
