= Zaprudskoye =

Zaprudskoye Запрудское
- Selo
- Location within Voronezh Oblast Location within Russia
- Coordinates: 51°20′54″N 39°43′39″E
- Country: Russia
- Region: Voronezh Oblast
- District: Kashirsky District
- Time zone: UTC+3:00

Zaprudskoye (Russian: Запрудское) is a rural locality (a selo) and the administrative center of Zaprudskoye Rural Settlement, Kashirsky District, Voronezh Oblast, Russia. The population was 768 as of 2010. There are 10 streets.

== Geography ==
Zaprudskoye is located 18 km southeast of Kashirskoye (the district's administrative centre) by road. Krasny Log is the nearest rural locality.
