= Sasovka 2-ya =

Sasovka 2-ya Сасовка 2-я
- Khutor
- Location within Voronezh Oblast Location within Russia
- Coordinates: 51°01′N 38°53′E
- Country: Russia
- Region: Voronezh Oblast
- District: Repyovsky District
- Time zone: UTC+3:00

Sasovka 2-ya (Russian: Сасовка 2-я) is a rural locality (a khutor) in Kolbinskoye Rural Settlement, Repyovsky District, Voronezh Oblast, Russia. The population was 64 as of 2010.

== Geography ==
Sasovka 2-ya is located 26 km east of Repyovka (the district's administrative centre) by road. Kolbino is the nearest rural locality.
