= Zaluzhnoye =

Zaluzhnoye Залужное
- Selo
- Location within Voronezh Oblast Location within Russia
- Coordinates: 50°57′N 39°31′E
- Country: Russia
- Region: Voronezh Oblast
- District: Liskinsky District
- Time zone: UTC+3:00

Zaluzhnoye (Russian: Залужное) is a rural locality (a selo) and the administrative center of Zaluzhenskoye Rural Settlement, Liskinsky District, Voronezh Oblast, Russia. The population was 1,970 as of 2010. There are 40 streets.

== Geography ==
Zaluzhnoye is located 11 km southeast of Liski (the district's administrative centre) by road. Nikolsky is the nearest rural locality.
