= Dmitro-Pokrovskoye =

Dmitro-Pokrovskoye Дмитро-Покровское
- Selo
- Location within Voronezh Oblast Location within Russia
- Coordinates: 51°46′N 39°52′E
- Country: Russia
- Region: Voronezh Oblast
- District: Verkhnekhavsky District
- Time zone: UTC+3:00

Dmitro-Pokrovskoye (Russian: Дмитро-Покровское) is a rural locality (a selo) in Sukhogayovskoye Rural Settlement, Verkhnekhavsky District, Voronezh Oblast, Russia. The population was 56 as of 2010. There are 3 streets.

== Geography ==
Dmitro-Pokrovskoye is located 10 km southwest of Verkhnyaya Khava (the district's administrative centre) by road. Sukhiye Gai is the nearest rural locality.
