= Leninsky, Voronezh Oblast =

Leninsky Ленинский
- Settlement
- Location within Voronezh Oblast Location within Russia
- Coordinates: 51°17′N 41°15′E
- Country: Russia
- Region: Voronezh Oblast
- District: Novokhopyorsky District
- Time zone: UTC+3:00

Leninsky (Russian: Ле́нинский) is a rural locality (a settlement) in Novopokrovskoye Rural Settlement, Novokhopyorsky District, Voronezh Oblast, Russia. The population was 245 as of 2010. There are 4 streets.
