= Khitrovka, Voronezh Oblast =

Khitrovka Хитровка
- Selo
- Location within Voronezh Oblast Location within Russia
- Coordinates: 51°43′N 40°16′E
- Country: Russia
- Region: Voronezh Oblast
- District: Paninsky District
- Time zone: UTC+3:00

Khitrovka (Russian: Хитровка) is a rural locality (a selo) in Krasnenskoye Rural Settlement, Paninsky District, Voronezh Oblast, Russia. The population was 60 as of 2010. There are 2 streets.

== Geography ==
Khitrovka is located 20 km northeast of Panino (the district's administrative centre) by road. Shcherbachyovka is the nearest rural locality.
