= Liski (selo) =

Liski Лиски
- Selo
- Location within Voronezh Oblast Location within Russia
- Coordinates: 50°56′N 39°29′E
- Country: Russia
- Region: Voronezh Oblast
- District: Liskinsky District
- Time zone: UTC+3:00

Liski (Russian: Лиски) is a rural locality (a selo) in Zaluzhenskoye Rural Settlement, Liskinsky District, Voronezh Oblast, Russia. The population was 2,490 as of 2010. There are 12 streets.

== Geography ==
It is located 15 km south of Liski (the district's administrative centre) by road. Zaluzhnoye is the nearest rural locality.
