= Dalnyaya Polubyanka =

Dalnyaya Polubyanka Дальняя Полубянка
- Selo
- Location within Voronezh Oblast Location within Russia
- Coordinates: 50°43′N 39°01′E
- Country: Russia
- Region: Voronezh Oblast
- District: Ostrogozhsky District
- Time zone: UTC+3:00

Dalnyaya Polubyanka (Russian: Дальняя Полубянка) is a rural locality (a selo) and the administrative center of Dalnepolubyanskoye Rural Settlement, Ostrogozhsky District, Voronezh Oblast, Russia. The population was 401 as of 2010. There are 7 streets.

== Geography ==
Dalnyaya Polubyanka is located 29 km south of Ostrogozhsk (the district's administrative centre) by road. Vladimirovka is the nearest rural locality.
