= Morozov, Voronezh Oblast =

Morozov Морозов
- Khutor
- Location within Voronezh Oblast Location within Russia
- Coordinates: 50°24′N 40°48′E
- Country: Russia
- Region: Voronezh Oblast
- District: Kalacheyevsky District
- Time zone: UTC+3:00

Morozov (Russian: Морозов) is a rural locality (a khutor) in Melovatskoye Rural Settlement, Kalacheyevsky District, Voronezh Oblast, Russia. The population was 73 as of 2010.

== Geography ==
Morozov is located 19 km west of Kalach (the district's administrative centre) by road. Novomelovatka is the nearest rural locality.
