= Verkhnyaya Plavitsa =

Verkhnyaya Plavitsa Верхняя Плавица
- Selo
- Location within Voronezh Oblast Location within Russia
- Coordinates: 51°55′N 40°13′E
- Country: Russia
- Region: Voronezh Oblast
- District: Verkhnekhavsky District
- Time zone: UTC+3:00

Verkhnyaya Plavitsa (Russian: Верхняя Плавица) is a rural locality (a selo) and the administrative center of Verkhneplavitskoye Rural Settlement, Verkhnekhavsky District, Voronezh Oblast, Russia. The population was 432 as of 2010. There are 9 streets.

== Geography ==
Verkhnyaya Plavitsa is located 26 km northeast of Verkhnyaya Khava (the district's administrative centre) by road. Maly Samovets is the nearest rural locality.
