= MTF Voskhod =

MTF Voskhod МТФ «Восход»
- Settlement
- Location within Voronezh Oblast Location within Russia
- Coordinates: 51°50′N 40°45′E
- Country: Russia
- Region: Voronezh Oblast
- District: Ertilsky District
- Time zone: UTC+3:00

MTF Voskhod (Russian: МТФ «Восход») is a rural locality (a settlement) in Ertil, Ertilsky District, Voronezh Oblast, Russia. The population was 394 as of 2010. There are 4 streets.

== Geography ==
MTF Voskhod is located 2 km northwest of Ertil (the district's administrative centre) by road. Ertil is the nearest rural locality.
