= Krasovka =

Krasovka Красовка
- Village
- Location within Voronezh Oblast Location within Russia
- Coordinates: 51°26′N 41°29′E
- Country: Russia
- Region: Voronezh Oblast
- District: Gribanovsky District
- Time zone: UTC+3:00

Krasovka (Russian: Кра́совка) is a rural locality (a village) in Listopadovskoye Rural Settlement, Gribanovsky District, Voronezh Oblast, Russia. The population was 148 in 2010.

== Geography ==
Krasovka is located 38 km west of Gribanovsky (the district's administrative centre) by road. Polyana is the nearest rural locality.
