= Novotolucheyevo =

Novotolucheyevo Новотолучеево
- Selo
- Location within Voronezh Oblast Location within Russia
- Coordinates: 50°32′N 40°58′E
- Country: Russia
- Region: Voronezh Oblast
- District: Vorobyovsky District
- Time zone: UTC+3:00

Novotolucheyevo (Russian: Новотолучеево) is a rural locality (a selo) in Vorobyovskoye Rural Settlement, Vorobyovsky District, Voronezh Oblast, Russia. The population was 823 as of 2010. There are seven streets.

== Geography ==
Novotolucheyevo is located 15 km south of Vorobyovka (the district's administrative centre) by road. Rudnya is the nearest rural locality.
