= Tverdokhlebovka =

Tverdokhlebovka Твердохлебовка
- Selo
- Location within Voronezh Oblast Location within Russia
- Coordinates: 49°58′N 40°23′E
- Country: Russia
- Region: Voronezh Oblast
- District: Bogucharsky District
- Time zone: UTC+3:00

Tverdokhlebovka (Russian: Твердохлебовка) is a rural locality (a selo) and the administrative center of Tverdokhlebovskoye Rural Settlement, Bogucharsky District, Voronezh Oblast, Russia. The population was 726 as of 2010. There are 9 streets.

== Geography ==
Tverdokhlebovka is located on the left bank of the Bogucharka River, 23 km west of Boguchar (the district's administrative centre) by road. Lugovoye is the nearest rural locality.
