= Pervomaysky, Talovsky District, Voronezh Oblast =

Pervomaysky Первомайский
- Settlement
- Location within Voronezh Oblast Location within Russia
- Coordinates: 51°06′N 40°33′E
- Country: Russia
- Region: Voronezh Oblast
- District: Talovsky District
- Time zone: UTC+3:00

Pervomaysky (Russian: Первомайский) is a rural locality (a settlement) in Novochigolskoye Rural Settlement, Talovsky District, Voronezh Oblast, Russia. The population was 51 as of 2010.

== Geography ==
It is located on the Chigla River, 15 km west of Talovaya.
