= Zaytsevka =

Zaytsevka Зайцевка
- Selo
- Location within Voronezh Oblast Location within Russia
- Coordinates: 49°41′N 40°00′E
- Country: Russia
- Region: Voronezh Oblast
- District: Kantemirovsky District
- Time zone: UTC+3:00

Zaytsevka (Russian: Зайцевка) is a rural locality (a selo) and the administrative center of Zaytsevskoye Rural Settlement, Kantemirovsky District, Voronezh Oblast, Russia. The population was 545 as of 2010. There are 2 streets.

== Geography ==
Zaytsevka is located 13 km east of Kantemirovka (the district's administrative centre) by road. Garmashevka is the nearest rural locality.
