= Kupalny =

Kupalny Купальный
- Settlement
- Location within Voronezh Oblast Location within Russia
- Coordinates: 51°03′N 40°52′E
- Country: Russia
- Region: Voronezh Oblast
- District: Talovsky District
- Time zone: UTC+3:00

Kupalny (Russian: Купальный) is a rural locality (a settlement) in Nizhnekamenskoye Rural Settlement, Talovsky District, Voronezh Oblast, Russia. The population was 94 as of 2010.

== Geography ==
It is located 10 km southeast from Talovaya.
