= Varvarino, Voronezh Oblast =

Varvarino Варварино
- Settlement
- Location within Voronezh Oblast Location within Russia
- Coordinates: 51°12′N 41°43′E
- Country: Russia
- Region: Voronezh Oblast
- District: Novokhopyorsky District
- Time zone: UTC+3:00

Varvarino (Russian: Варва́рино) is a rural locality (a settlement) in Novokhopyorsk, Novokhopyorsky District, Voronezh Oblast, Russia. The population was 165 as of 2010.

== Geography ==
Varvarino is located 19 km northeast of Novokhopyorsk (the district's administrative centre) by road. Alfyorovka is the nearest rural locality.
