= Administrative divisions of Voronezh Oblast =

Voronezh Oblast Russia
- Administrative center: Voronezh

Administrative structure (as of 2012)
- Districts: 32
- Cities/towns: 15
- Urban-type settlements: 21
- Selsovets: 488

Municipal structure (as of 2002)
- Rural settlements: 1,872 (inhabited); 125 (uninhabited)

Voronezh Oblast is a federal subject of Russia.

== Administrative and municipal divisions ==
- Cities and towns under the oblast's jurisdiction:
  - Voronezh (Воронеж) (administrative center)
    - city districts:
      - Kominternovsky (Коминтерновский)
        - with 1 selsovet under the city district's jurisdiction.
      - Leninsky (Ленинский)
      - Levoberezhny (Левобережный)
        - with 2 selsovets under the city district's jurisdiction.
      - Sovetsky (Советский)
        - Urban-type settlements under the city district's jurisdiction:
          - Pridonskoy (Придонской)
          - Shilovo (Шилово)
        - with 2 selsovets under the city district's jurisdiction.
      - Tsentralny (Центральный)
      - Zheleznodorozhny (Железнодорожный)
        - Urban-type settlements under the city district's jurisdiction:
          - Krasnolesny (Краснолесный)
          - Somovo (Сомово)
        - with 1 selsovet under the city district's jurisdiction.
  - Borisoglebsk (Борисоглебск)
  - Novovoronezh (Нововоронеж)
- Districts:
  - Anninsky (Аннинский)
    - Urban-type settlements under the district's jurisdiction:
      - Anna (Анна)
    - with 22 selsovets under the district's jurisdiction.
  - Bobrovsky (Бобровский)
    - Towns under the district's jurisdiction:
      - Bobrov (Бобров)
    - with 18 selsovets under the district's jurisdiction.
  - Bogucharsky (Богучарский)
    - Towns under the district's jurisdiction:
      - Boguchar (Богучар)
    - with 13 selsovets under the district's jurisdiction.
  - Borisoglebsky (Борисоглебский)
    - with 11 selsovets under the district's jurisdiction.
  - Buturlinovsky (Бутурлиновский)
    - Towns under the district's jurisdiction:
      - Buturlinovka (Бутурлиновка)
    - Urban-type settlements under the district's jurisdiction:
      - Nizhny Kislyay (Нижний Кисляй)
    - with 14 selsovets under the district's jurisdiction.
  - Ertilsky (Эртильский)
    - Towns under the district's jurisdiction:
      - Ertil (Эртиль)
    - with 13 selsovets under the district's jurisdiction.
  - Gribanovsky (Грибановский)
    - Urban-type settlements under the district's jurisdiction:
      - Gribanovsky (Грибановский)
    - with 16 selsovets under the district's jurisdiction.
  - Kalacheyevsky (Калачеевский)
    - Towns under the district's jurisdiction:
      - Kalach (Калач)
    - with 16 selsovets under the district's jurisdiction.
  - Kamensky (Каменский)
    - Urban-type settlements under the district's jurisdiction:
      - Kamenka (Каменка)
    - with 10 selsovets under the district's jurisdiction.
  - Kantemirovsky (Кантемировский)
    - Urban-type settlements under the district's jurisdiction:
      - Kantemirovka (Кантемировка)
    - with 15 selsovets under the district's jurisdiction.
  - Kashirsky (Каширский)
    - with 14 selsovets under the district's jurisdiction.
  - Khokholsky (Хохольский)
    - Urban-type settlements under the district's jurisdiction:
      - Khokholsky (Хохольский)
    - with 15 selsovets under the district's jurisdiction.
  - Liskinsky (Лискинский)
    - Towns under the district's jurisdiction:
      - Liski (Лиски)
    - Urban-type settlements under the district's jurisdiction:
      - Davydovka (Давыдовка)
    - with 21 selsovets under the district's jurisdiction.
  - Nizhnedevitsky (Нижнедевицкий)
    - with 15 selsovets under the district's jurisdiction.
  - Novokhopyorsky (Новохопёрский)
    - Towns under the district's jurisdiction:
      - Novokhopyorsk (Новохопёрск)
    - Urban-type settlements under the district's jurisdiction:
      - Novokhopyorsky (Новохопёрский)
      - Yelan-Kolenovsky (Елань-Коленовский)
    - with 19 selsovets under the district's jurisdiction.
  - Novousmansky (Новоусманский)
    - with 16 selsovets under the district's jurisdiction.
  - Olkhovatsky (Ольховатский)
    - Urban-type settlements under the district's jurisdiction:
      - Olkhovatka (Ольховатка)
    - with 12 selsovets under the district's jurisdiction.
  - Ostrogozhsky (Острогожский)
    - Towns under the district's jurisdiction:
      - Ostrogozhsk (Острогожск)
    - with 19 selsovets under the district's jurisdiction.
  - Paninsky (Панинский)
    - Urban-type settlements under the district's jurisdiction:
      - Panino (Панино)
      - Perelyoshinsky (Перелёшинский)
    - with 14 selsovets under the district's jurisdiction.
  - Pavlovsky (Павловский)
    - Towns under the district's jurisdiction:
      - Pavlovsk (Павловск)
    - with 14 selsovets under the district's jurisdiction.
  - Petropavlovsky (Петропавловский)
    - with 11 selsovets under the district's jurisdiction.
  - Podgorensky (Подгоренский)
    - Urban-type settlements under the district's jurisdiction:
      - Podgorensky (Подгоренский)
    - with 15 selsovets under the district's jurisdiction.
  - Povorinsky (Поворинский)
    - Towns under the district's jurisdiction:
      - Povorino (Поворино)
    - with 8 selsovets under the district's jurisdiction.
  - Ramonsky (Рамонский)
    - Urban-type settlements under the district's jurisdiction:
      - Ramon (Рамонь)
    - with 15 selsovets under the district's jurisdiction.
  - Repyovsky (Репьёвский)
    - with 11 selsovets under the district's jurisdiction.
  - Rossoshansky (Россошанский)
    - Towns under the district's jurisdiction:
      - Rossosh (Россошь)
    - with 17 selsovets under the district's jurisdiction.
  - Semiluksky (Семилукский)
    - Towns under the district's jurisdiction:
      - Semiluki (Семилуки)
    - Urban-type settlements under the district's jurisdiction:
      - Latnaya (Латная)
      - Strelitsa (Стрелица)
    - with 20 selsovets under the district's jurisdiction.
  - Talovsky (Таловский)
    - Urban-type settlements under the district's jurisdiction:
      - Talovaya (Таловая)
    - with 23 selsovets under the district's jurisdiction.
  - Ternovsky (Терновский)
    - with 15 selsovets under the district's jurisdiction.
  - Verkhnekhavsky (Верхнехавский)
    - with 17 selsovets under the district's jurisdiction.
  - Verkhnemamonsky (Верхнемамонский)
    - with 12 selsovets under the district's jurisdiction.
  - Vorobyovsky (Воробьёвский)
    - with 11 selsovets under the district's jurisdiction.
