= Lomovo =

Lomovo may refer to the following villages in Russia:

- Lomovo, Bashkortostan
- Lomovo, Belgorod Oblast
- Lomovo, Kaliningrad Oblast
- Lomovo, Vologda Oblast
- Lomovo, Voronezh Oblast
