= Devitsa, Semiluksky District, Voronezh Oblast =

Devitsa Девица
- Selo
- Location within Voronezh Oblast Location within Russia
- Coordinates: 51°38′N 38°57′E
- Country: Russia
- Region: Voronezh Oblast
- District: Semiluksky District
- Time zone: UTC+3:00

Devitsa (Russian: Девица) is a rural locality (a selo) and the administrative center of Devitskoye Rural Settlement, Semiluksky District, Voronezh Oblast, Russia. The population was 5,219 (2021 census).

== Geography ==
Devitsa is located on the Veduga river, two kilometres (1.2 mi) of from Semiluki (the district's administrative centre) by road. Semiluki is the nearest rural locality.
