= Buturlinovsky =

Buturlinovsky (masculine), Buturlinovskaya (feminine), or Buturlinovskoye (neuter) may refer to:

- Buturlinovsky District, a district in Voronezh Oblast, Russia
- Buturlinovskoye Urban Settlement, an administrative division and a municipal formation which the town of Buturlinovka and three rural localities in Buturlinovsky District of Voronezh Oblast, Russia are incorporated as
