= Staraya Olshanka =

Staraya Olshanka Старая Ольшанка
- Selo
- Location within Voronezh Oblast Location within Russia
- Coordinates: 51°51′N 38°33′E
- Country: Russia
- Region: Voronezh Oblast
- District: Semiluksky District
- Time zone: UTC+3:00

Staraya Olshanka (Russian: Старая Ольшанка) is a rural locality (a selo) in Starovedugskoye Rural Settlement, Semiluksky District, Voronezh Oblast, Russia. The population was 383 as of 2010. There are 7 streets.

== Geography ==
Staraya Olshanka is located on the Olshanka River, 57 km northwest of Semiluki (the district's administrative centre) by road. Staraya Veduga is the nearest rural locality.
