= Gremyachye =

Gremyachye Гремячье
- Selo
- Location within Voronezh Oblast Location within Russia
- Coordinates: 51°58′N 38°47′E
- Country: Russia
- Region: Voronezh Oblast
- District: Ramonsky District
- Time zone: UTC+3:00

Gremyachye (Russian: Гремячье) is a rural locality (a selo) and the administrative center of Pavlovskoye Rural Settlement, Ramonsky District, Voronezh Oblast, Russia. The population was 235 as of 2010. There are 5 streets.

== Geography ==
Gremyachye is located on the Bolshaya Vereyka River, 48 km northwest of Ramon (the district's administrative centre) by road. Lebyazhye is the nearest rural locality.
