= VNIISS =

VNIISS ВНИИСС
- Settlement
- Location within Voronezh Oblast Location within Russia
- Coordinates: 51°55′N 39°18′E
- Country: Russia
- Region: Voronezh Oblast
- District: Ramonsky District
- Time zone: UTC+3:00

VNIISS (Russian: ВНИИСС) is a rural locality (a settlement) in Aydarovskoye Rural Settlement, Ramonsky District, Voronezh Oblast, Russia. The population was 2,286 as of 2010. There are 18 streets.

== Geography ==
VNIISS is located 3 km northwest of Ramon (the district's administrative centre) by road. Aydarovo is the nearest rural locality.
