= Bystrik, Voronezh Oblast =

Bystrik Быстрик
- Khutor
- Location within Voronezh Oblast Location within Russia
- Coordinates: 51°53′N 38°46′E
- Country: Russia
- Region: Voronezh Oblast
- District: Semiluksky District
- Time zone: UTC+3:00

Bystrik (Russian: Быстрик) is a rural locality (a khutor) in Zemlyanskoye Rural Settlement, Semiluksky District, Voronezh Oblast, Russia. The population was 51 as of 2010.

== Geography ==
Bystrik is located 33 km northwest of Semiluki (the district's administrative centre) by road. Zemlyansk is the nearest rural locality.
