= Lopatki, Voronezh Oblast =

Lopatki Лопатки
- Selo
- Location within Voronezh Oblast Location within Russia
- Coordinates: 51°58′N 39°20′E
- Country: Russia
- Region: Voronezh Oblast
- District: Ramonsky District
- Time zone: UTC+3:00

Lopatki (Russian: Лопатки) is a rural locality (a selo) in Beryozovskoye Rural Settlement, Ramonsky District, Voronezh Oblast, Russia. The population was 358 as of 2010. There are 8 streets.

== Geography ==
Lopatki is located 12 km north of Ramon (the district's administrative centre) by road. Borki is the nearest rural locality.
