= Novosilsky =

Novosilsky (Russian: Новосильский; masculine), Novosilskaya (Новосильская; feminine), or Novosilskoye (Новосильское; neuter) is the name of several rural localities in Russia:

- Novosilskoye, Lipetsk Oblast, a selo in Novosilsky Selsoviet of Terbunsky District of Lipetsk Oblast
- Novosilskoye, Voronezh Oblast, a selo in Novosilskoye Rural Settlement of Semiluksky District of Voronezh Oblast
