= Malaya Pokrovka =

Malaya Pokrovka Малая Покровка
- Selo
- Location within Voronezh Oblast Location within Russia
- Coordinates: 52°00′N 38°38′E
- Country: Russia
- Region: Voronezh Oblast
- District: Semiluksky District
- Time zone: UTC+3:00

Malaya Pokrovka (Russian: Малая Покровка) is a rural locality (a selo) in Zemlyanskoye Rural Settlement, Semiluksky District, Voronezh Oblast, Russia. The population was 329 as of 2010. There are 2 streets.

== Geography ==
Malaya Pokrovka is located 55 km northwest of Semiluki (the district's administrative centre) by road. Malaya Vereyka is the nearest rural locality.
