= Yamnoye, Voronezh Oblast =

Yamnoye Ямное
- Selo
- Location within Voronezh Oblast Location within Russia
- Coordinates: 51°47′N 39°08′E
- Country: Russia
- Region: Voronezh Oblast
- District: Ramonsky District
- Time zone: UTC+3:00

Yamnoye (Russian: Ямное) is a rural locality (a selo) and the administrative center of Yamenskoye Rural Settlement, Ramonsky District, Voronezh Oblast, Russia. The population was 6,062 (2021 census); 2,309 as of 2010. There are 180 streets.

== Geography ==
Yamnoye is located 30 km southwest of Ramon (the district's administrative centre) by road. Novopodkletnoye is the nearest rural locality.
