= Starozhivotinnoye =

Starozhivotinnoye Староживотинное
- Selo
- Location within Voronezh Oblast Location within Russia
- Coordinates: 51°53′N 39°15′E
- Country: Russia
- Region: Voronezh Oblast
- District: Ramonsky District
- Time zone: UTC+3:00

Starozhivotinnoye (Russian: Староживотинное) is a rural locality (a selo) in Aydarovskoye Rural Settlement, Ramonsky District, Voronezh Oblast, Russia. The population was 179 as of 2010. There are 103 streets.

== Geography ==
Starozhivotinnoye is located 8 km southwest of Ramon (the district's administrative centre) by road. Aydarovo is the nearest rural locality.
