= Karaychevka =

Karaychevka Карайчевка
- Selo
- Location within Voronezh Oblast Location within Russia
- Coordinates: 50°53′N 40°17′E
- Country: Russia
- Region: Voronezh Oblast
- District: Buturlinovsky District
- Time zone: UTC+3:00

Karaychevka (Russian: Карайчевка) is a rural locality (a selo) and the administrative center of Karaychevskoye Rural Settlement, Buturlinovsky District, Voronezh Oblast, Russia. The population was 860 as of 2010. There are 9 streets. Karaychevka is located 27 km northwest of Buturlinovka (the district's administrative centre) by road. Piramidy is the nearest rural locality.
