= Russkaya Gvozdyovka =

Russkaya Gvozdyovka Русская Гвоздёвка
- Selo
- Location within Voronezh Oblast Location within Russia
- Coordinates: 51°49′N 39°04′E
- Country: Russia
- Region: Voronezh Oblast
- District: Ramonsky District
- Time zone: UTC+3:00

Russkaya Gvozdyovka (Russian: Русская Гвоздёвка) is a rural locality (a selo) and the administrative center of Russko-Gvozdyovskoye Rural Settlement, Ramonsky District, Voronezh Oblast, Russia. The population was 892 as of 2010. There are 16 streets.

== Geography ==
Russkaya Gvozdyovka is located on the right bank of the Don River, 30 km southwest of Ramon (the district's administrative centre) by road. Gvozdyovka is the nearest rural locality.
