= Treshchevka =

Treshchevka Трещевка
- Selo
- Location within Voronezh Oblast Location within Russia
- Coordinates: 51°52′N 38°57′E
- Country: Russia
- Region: Voronezh Oblast
- District: Ramonsky District
- Time zone: UTC+3:00

Treshchevka (Russian: Трещевка) is a rural locality (a selo) in Chistopolyanskoye Rural Settlement, Ramonsky District, Voronezh Oblast, Russia. The population was 77 as of 2010. There are 3 streets.

== Geography ==
Treshchevka is located 41 km west of Ramon (the district's administrative centre) by road. Medvezhye is the nearest rural locality.
