= Glushitsy, Voronezh Oblast =

Glushitsy Глушицы
- Selo
- Location within Voronezh Oblast Location within Russia
- Coordinates: 52°02′30″N 39°20′55″E
- Country: Russia
- Region: Voronezh Oblast
- District: Ramonsky District
- Time zone: UTC+3:00

Glushitsy (Russian: Глушицы) is a rural locality (a selo) in Karachunskoye Rural Settlement, Ramonsky District, Voronezh Oblast, Russia. The population was 187 as of 2010. There are 7 streets.

== Geography ==
Glushitsy is located on the right bank of the Voronezh River, 21 km north of Ramon (the district's administrative centre) by road. Nelzha is the nearest rural locality.
