= Kondrashyovka =

Kondrashyovka Кондрашёвка
- Selo
- Location within Voronezh Oblast Location within Russia
- Coordinates: 51°47′N 38°44′E
- Country: Russia
- Region: Voronezh Oblast
- District: Semiluksky District

Population (2010)
  - Total: 229
- Time zone: UTC+3:00

Kondrashyovka (Russian: Кондрашёвка) is a rural locality (a selo) in Stadnitskoye Rural Settlement, Semiluksky District, Voronezh Oblast, Russia. As of the 2010 census, its population was 229. The locality includes 12 streets.

== Geography ==
Kondrashyovka is located 40 km northwest of Semiluki, the administrative centre of the district by road. The nearest rural locality is Stadnitsa.
