= Tolucheyevo =

Tolucheyevo Толучеево
- Selo
- Location within Voronezh Oblast Location within Russia
- Coordinates: 50°50′N 41°01′E
- Country: Russia
- Region: Voronezh Oblast
- District: Buturlinovsky District
- Time zone: UTC+3:00

Tolucheyevo (Russian: Толучеево) is a rural locality (a selo) in Kolodeyevskoye Rural Settlement, Buturlinovsky District, Voronezh Oblast, Russia. The population was 86 as of 2010.

== Geography ==
Tolucheyevo is located 40 km east of Buturlinovka (the district's administrative centre) by road. Kucheryayevka is the nearest rural locality.
