= Kucheryayevka =

Kucheryayevka Кучеряевка
- Selo
- Location within Voronezh Oblast Location within Russia
- Coordinates: 50°52′N 40°55′E
- Country: Russia
- Region: Voronezh Oblast
- District: Buturlinovsky District
- Time zone: UTC+3:00

Kucheryayevka (Russian: Кучеряевка) is a rural locality (a selo) and the administrative center of Kucheryayevskoye Rural Settlement, Buturlinovsky District, Voronezh Oblast, Russia. The population was 530 as of 2010. There are 6 streets.

== Geography ==
Kucheryayevka is located 32 km east of Buturlinovka (the district's administrative centre) by road. Vasilyevka is the nearest rural locality.
