= Goslesopitomnika =

Goslesopitomnika Гослесопитомника
- Settlement
- Location within Voronezh Oblast Location within Russia
- Coordinates: 51°42′N 38°36′E
- Country: Russia
- Region: Voronezh Oblast
- District: Semiluksky District
- Time zone: UTC+3:00

Goslesopitomnika (Russian: Гослесопитомника) is a rural locality (a settlement) in Nizhnevedugskoye Rural Settlement, Semiluksky District, Voronezh Oblast, Russia. The population was 222 as of 2010.

== Geography ==
Goslesopitomnika is located 36 km west of Semiluki (the district's administrative centre) by road. Izbishche is the nearest rural locality.
