= Zatsepnoye =

Zatsepnoye Зацепное
- Khutor
- Location within Voronezh Oblast Location within Russia
- Coordinates: 51°53′N 38°40′E
- Country: Russia
- Region: Voronezh Oblast
- District: Semiluksky District
- Time zone: UTC+3:00

Zatsepnoye (Russian: Зацепное) is a rural locality (a khutor) in Zemlyanskoye Rural Settlement, Semiluksky District, Voronezh Oblast, Russia. The population was 65 as of 2010.

== Geography ==
Zatsepnoye is located 40 km northwest of Semiluki (the district's administrative centre) by road. Zemlyansk is the nearest rural locality.
