= Piramidy =

Piramidy Пирамиды
- Selo
- Location within Voronezh Oblast Location within Russia
- Coordinates: 50°51′N 40°18′E
- Country: Russia
- Region: Voronezh Oblast
- District: Buturlinovsky District
- Time zone: UTC+3:00

Piramidy (Russian: Пирамиды) is a rural locality (a selo) in Karaychevskoye Rural Settlement, Buturlinovsky District, Voronezh Oblast, Russia. The population was 84 as of 2010. There are 2 streets.

== Geography ==
Piramidy is located 25 km west of Buturlinovka (the district's administrative centre) by road. Alekseyevsky is the nearest rural locality.
