= Beryozovo, Ramonsky District, Voronezh Oblast =

Beryozovo Берёзово
- Selo
- Location within Voronezh Oblast Location within Russia
- Coordinates: 51°55′N 39°21′E
- Country: Russia
- Region: Voronezh Oblast
- District: Ramonsky District
- Time zone: UTC+3:00

Beryozovo (Russian: Берёзово) is a rural locality (a selo) and the administrative center of Beryozovskoye Rural Settlement, Ramonsky District, Voronezh Oblast, Russia. The population was 1,542 as of 2010. There are 25 streets.

== Geography ==
Beryozovo is located 4 km north of Ramon (the district's administrative centre) by road. Ramon is the nearest rural locality.
