= Nizhnyaya Vereyka =

Nizhnyaya Vereyka Нижняя Верейка
- Selo
- Location within Voronezh Oblast Location within Russia
- Coordinates: 51°58′N 39°03′E
- Country: Russia
- Region: Voronezh Oblast
- District: Ramonsky District
- Time zone: UTC+3:00

Nizhnyaya Vereyka (Russian: Нижняя Верейка) is a rural locality (a selo) in Sklyayevskoye Rural Settlement, Ramonsky District, Voronezh Oblast, Russia. The population was 108 as of 2010. There are 4 streets.

== Geography ==
Nizhnyaya Vereyka is located on the Bolshaya Vereyka River, 33 km northwest of Ramon (the district's administrative centre) by road. Sklyayevo is the nearest rural locality.
