= Izbishche =

Izbishche Избище
- Selo
- Location within Voronezh Oblast Location within Russia
- Coordinates: 51°42′N 38°34′E
- Country: Russia
- Region: Voronezh Oblast
- District: Semiluksky District
- Time zone: UTC+3:00

Izbishche (Russian: Избище) is a rural locality (a selo) in Nizhnevedugskoye Rural Settlement, Semiluksky District, Voronezh Oblast, Russia. The population was 119 as of 2010. There are 7 streets.

== Geography ==
Izbishche is located 49 km west of Semiluki (the district's administrative centre) by road. Andreyevka is the nearest rural locality.
