= Melovatka, Voronezh Oblast =

Melovatka Меловатка
- Selo
- Location within Voronezh Oblast Location within Russia
- Coordinates: 51°49′N 38°39′E
- Country: Russia
- Region: Voronezh Oblast
- District: Semiluksky District
- Time zone: UTC+3:00

Melovatka (Russian: Меловатка) is a rural locality (a selo) in Nizhnevedugskoye Rural Settlement, Semiluksky District, Voronezh Oblast, Russia. The population was 349 as of 2010. There are 9 streets.

== Geography ==
Melovatka is located 47 km northwest of Semiluki (the district's administrative centre) by road. Staraya Olshanka is the nearest rural locality.
