= Ivnitsy =

Ivnitsy Ивницы
- Village
- Location within Voronezh Oblast Location within Russia
- Coordinates: 51°56′N 39°21′E
- Country: Russia
- Region: Voronezh Oblast
- District: Ramonsky District
- Time zone: UTC+3:00

Ivnitsy (Russian: Ивницы) is a rural locality (a village) in Beryozovskoye Rural Settlement, Ramonsky District, Voronezh Oblast, Russia. The population was 115 as of 2010. There are 18 streets.

== Geography ==
Ivnitsy is located 8 km northeast of Ramon (the district's administrative centre) by road. Borki is the nearest rural locality.
