= Gvozdyovka =

Gvozdyovka Гвоздёвка
- Selo
- Location within Voronezh Oblast Location within Russia
- Coordinates: 51°49′N 39°05′E
- Country: Russia
- Region: Voronezh Oblast
- District: Ramonsky District
- Time zone: UTC+3:00

Gvozdyovka (Russian: Гвоздёвка) is a rural locality (a selo) in Russko-Gvozdyovskoye Rural Settlement, Ramonsky District, Voronezh Oblast, Russia. The population was 103 as of 2010. There are 6 streets.

== Geography ==
Gvozdyovka is located 28 km southwest of Ramon (the district's administrative centre) by road. Russkaya Gvozdyovka is the nearest rural locality.
