= Solntse-Dubrava =

Solntse-Dubrava Солнце-Дубрава
- Selo
- Location within Voronezh Oblast Location within Russia
- Coordinates: 51°58′N 39°12′E
- Country: Russia
- Region: Voronezh Oblast
- District: Ramonsky District
- Time zone: UTC+3:00

Solntse-Dubrava (Russian: Солнце-Дубрава) is a rural locality (a selo) and the administrative center of Gorozhanskoye Rural Settlement, Ramonsky District, Voronezh Oblast, Russia. The population was 64 as of 2010. There are 4 streets.

== Geography ==
Solntse-Dubrava is located 14 km northwest of Ramon (the district's administrative centre) by road. Komsomolsky is the nearest rural locality.
