= Ternovoye, Semiluksky District, Voronezh Oblast =

Ternovoye Терновое
- Selo
- Location within Voronezh Oblast Location within Russia
- Coordinates: 51°44′N 39°01′E
- Country: Russia
- Region: Voronezh Oblast
- District: Semiluksky District
- Time zone: UTC+3:00

Ternovoye (Russian: Терновое) is a rural locality (a selo) in Gubaryovskoye Rural Settlement, Semiluksky District, Voronezh Oblast, Russia. The population was 113 as of 2010. There are 29 streets.

== Geography ==
Ternovoye is located on the right bank of the Veduga, 8 km north of Semiluki (the district's administrative centre) by road. Gudovka is the nearest rural locality.
