= Bolshaya Treshchevka =

Bolshaya Treshchevka Большая Трещевка
- Selo
- Location within Voronezh Oblast Location within Russia
- Coordinates: 51°56′N 38°50′E
- Country: Russia
- Region: Voronezh Oblast
- District: Ramonsky District
- Time zone: UTC+3:00

Bolshaya Treshchevka (Russian: Большая Трещевка) is a rural locality (a selo) in Somovskoye Rural Settlement, Ramonsky District, Voronezh Oblast, Russia. The population was 66 as of 2010. There are 7 streets.

== Geography ==
Bolshaya Treshchevka is located 44 km west of Ramon (the district's administrative centre) by road. Somovo is the nearest rural locality.
