= Tyunikovo =

Tyunikovo Тюниково
- Selo
- Location within Voronezh Oblast Location within Russia
- Coordinates: 50°52′N 40°43′E
- Country: Russia
- Region: Voronezh Oblast
- District: Buturlinovsky District
- Time zone: UTC+3:00

Tyunikovo (Russian: Тюниково) is a rural locality (a selo) in Velikoarkhangelskoye Rural Settlement, Buturlinovsky District, Voronezh Oblast, Russia. The population was 128 as of 2010. There are 4 streets.

== Geography ==
Tyunikovo is located 20 km northeast of Buturlinovka (the district's administrative centre) by road. Velikoarkhangelskoye is the nearest rural locality.
