= Filippenkovo =

Filippenkovo Филиппенково
- Selo
- Location within Voronezh Oblast Location within Russia
- Coordinates: 50°44′N 40°44′E
- Country: Russia
- Region: Voronezh Oblast
- District: Buturlinovsky District
- Time zone: UTC+3:00

Filippenkovo (Russian: Филиппенково) is a rural locality (a selo) and the administrative center of Filippenkovskoye Rural Settlement, Buturlinovsky District, Voronezh Oblast, Russia. The population was 915 as of 2010. There are 8 streets.

== Geography ==
Filippenkovo is located 18 km southeast of Buturlinovka (the district's administrative centre) by road. Masychevo is the nearest rural locality.
