= Patokino =

Patokino Патокино
- Selo
- Location within Voronezh Oblast Location within Russia
- Coordinates: 50°48′N 40°47′E
- Country: Russia
- Region: Voronezh Oblast
- District: Buturlinovsky District
- Time zone: UTC+3:00

Patokino (Russian: Патокино) is a rural locality (a selo) in Filippenkovskoye Rural Settlement, Buturlinovsky District, Voronezh Oblast, Russia. The population was 280 as of 2010. There are 4 streets.

== Geography ==
Patokino is located 16 km east of Buturlinovka (the district's administrative centre) by road. Yelizavetino is the nearest rural locality.
