= Puzevo =

Puzevo Пузево
- Selo
- Location within Voronezh Oblast Location within Russia
- Coordinates: 50°40′N 40°23′E
- Country: Russia
- Region: Voronezh Oblast
- District: Buturlinovsky District
- Time zone: UTC+3:00

Puzevo (Russian: Пузево) is a rural locality (a selo) and the administrative center of Puzevskoye Rural Settlement, Buturlinovsky District, Voronezh Oblast, Russia. The population was 1,977 as of 2010. There are 19 streets.

== Geography ==
Puzevo is located 26 km southwest of Buturlinovka (the district's administrative centre) by road. Klyopovka is the nearest rural locality.
