= Gnilusha =

Gnilusha Гнилуша
- Selo
- Location within Voronezh Oblast Location within Russia
- Coordinates: 51°44′N 38°34′E
- Country: Russia
- Region: Voronezh Oblast
- District: Semiluksky District
- Time zone: UTC+3:00

Gnilusha (Russian: Гнилуша) is a rural locality (a selo) in Nizhnevedugskoye Rural Settlement, Semiluksky District, Voronezh Oblast, Russia. The population was 444 as of 2010. There are 15 streets.

== Geography ==
Gnilusha is located 37 km northwest of Semiluki (the district's administrative centre) by road. Izbishche is the nearest rural locality.
