= Maly Kislyay =

Maly Kislyay Малый Кисляй
- Settlement
- Location within Voronezh Oblast Location within Russia
- Coordinates: 50°52′N 40°07′E
- Country: Russia
- Region: Voronezh Oblast
- District: Buturlinovsky District
- Time zone: UTC+3:00

Maly Kislyay (Russian: Малый Кисляй) is a rural locality (a settlement) in Nizhnekislyayskoye Rural Settlement, Buturlinovsky District, Voronezh Oblast, Russia. The population was 325 as of 2010. There are 2 streets.

== Geography ==
Maly Kislyay is located 39 km west of Buturlinovka (the district's administrative centre) by road. Nizhny Kislyay is the nearest rural locality.
