= Chulok =

Chulok Чулок
- Selo
- Location within Voronezh Oblast Location within Russia
- Coordinates: 50°56′N 40°38′E
- Country: Russia
- Region: Voronezh Oblast
- District: Buturlinovsky District
- Time zone: UTC+3:00

Chulok (Russian: Чулок) is a rural locality (a selo) and the administrative center of Chulokskoye Rural Settlement, Buturlinovsky District, Voronezh Oblast, Russia. The population was 610 as of 2010. There are 7 streets.

== Geography ==
Chulok is located 13 km northeast of Buturlinovka (the district's administrative centre) by road. Udarnik is the nearest rural locality.
