= Yelizavetino, Voronezh Oblast =

Yelizavetino Елизаветино
- Selo
- Location within Voronezh Oblast Location within Russia
- Coordinates: 50°45′N 40°48′E
- Country: Russia
- Region: Voronezh Oblast
- District: Buturlinovsky District
- Time zone: UTC+3:00

Yelizavetino (Russian: Елизаветино) is a rural locality (a selo) in Filippenkovskoye Rural Settlement, Buturlinovsky District, Voronezh Oblast, Russia. The population was 488 as of 2010. There are 7 streets.

== Geography ==
Yelizavetino is located 20 km southeast of Buturlinovka (the district's administrative centre) by road. Filippenkovo is the nearest rural locality.
