= Semiluki (selo) =

Semiluki Семилуки
- Selo
- Location within Voronezh Oblast Location within Russia
- Coordinates: 51°43′N 39°02′E
- Country: Russia
- Region: Voronezh Oblast
- District: Semiluksky District
- Time zone: UTC+3:00

Semiluki (Russian: Семилу́ки) is a rural locality (a selo) and the administrative center of Semilukskoye Rural Settlement, Semiluksky District, Voronezh Oblast, Russia. The population was 2,406 as of 2010. There are 47 streets.

== Geography ==
It is located 5 km north of Semiluki (the district's administrative centre) by road.
