= Sergeyevskoye, Voronezh Oblast =

Sergeyevskoye Сергеевское
- Settlement
- Location within Voronezh Oblast Location within Russia
- Coordinates: 51°59′N 39°13′E
- Country: Russia
- Region: Voronezh Oblast
- District: Ramonsky District
- Time zone: UTC+3:00

Sergeyevskoye (Russian: Сергеевское) is a rural locality (a settlement) in Komsomolskoye Rural Settlement, Ramonsky District, Voronezh Oblast, Russia. The population was 59 as of 2010. There are 2 streets.

== Geography ==
Sergeyevskoye is located 19 km northwest of Ramon (the district's administrative centre) by road. Komsomolsky is the nearest rural locality.
