= Posyolok sovkhoza Razdolye =

Posyolok sovkhoza Razdolye Посёлок совхоза «Раздолье»
- Settlement
- Location within Voronezh Oblast Location within Russia
- Coordinates: 51°47′N 39°01′E
- Country: Russia
- Region: Voronezh Oblast
- District: Semiluksky District
- Time zone: UTC+3:00

Posyolok sovkhoza Razdolye (Russian: Посёлок совхоза «Раздолье») is a rural locality (a settlement) in Gubaryovskoye Rural Settlement, Semiluksky District, Voronezh Oblast, Russia. The population was 436 as of 2010. There are 12 streets.

== Geography ==
The settlement is located 10 km north of Semiluki (the district's administrative centre) by road. Bogoyavlenovka is the nearest rural locality.
