= Klyopovka =

Klyopovka Клёповка
- Selo
- Location within Voronezh Oblast Location within Russia
- Coordinates: 50°42′N 40°26′E
- Country: Russia
- Region: Voronezh Oblast
- District: Buturlinovsky District
- Time zone: UTC+3:00

Klyopovka (Russian: Клёповка) is a rural locality (a selo) and the administrative center of Klyopovskoye Rural Settlement, Buturlinovsky District, Voronezh Oblast, Russia. The population was 2,453 as of 2010. There are 29 streets.

== Geography ==
Klyopovka is located 19 km southwest of Buturlinovka (the district's administrative centre) by road. Puzevo is the nearest rural locality.
