= Chistaya Polyana =

Chistaya Polyana Чистая Поляна
- Selo
- Location within Voronezh Oblast Location within Russia
- Coordinates: 51°53′N 38°50′E
- Country: Russia
- Region: Voronezh Oblast
- District: Ramonsky District
- Time zone: UTC+3:00

Chistaya Polyana (Russian: Чистая Поляна) is a rural locality (a selo) and the administrative center of Chistopolyanskoye Rural Settlement, Ramonsky District, Voronezh Oblast, Russia. The population was 499 as of 2010. There are 17 streets.

== Geography ==
Chistaya Polyana is located 44 km west of Ramon (the district's administrative centre) by road. Perlevka is the nearest rural locality.
