= Karachun, Voronezh Oblast =

Karachun Карачун
- Selo
- Location within Voronezh Oblast Location within Russia
- Coordinates: 52°00′N 39°21′E
- Country: Russia
- Region: Voronezh Oblast
- District: Ramonsky District
- Time zone: UTC+3:00

Karachun (Russian: Карачун) is a rural locality (a selo) and the administrative center of Karachunskoye Rural Settlement, Ramonsky District, Voronezh Oblast, Russia. The population was 708 as of 2010. There are 14 streets.

== Geography ==
Karachun is located 18 km north of Ramon (the district's administrative centre) by road. Pekshevo is the nearest rural locality.
