= Gvazda =

Gvazda Гвазда
- Selo
- Location within Voronezh Oblast Location within Russia
- Coordinates: 50°44′N 40°28′E
- Country: Russia
- Region: Voronezh Oblast
- District: Buturlinovsky District
- Time zone: UTC+3:00

Gvazda (Russian: Гвазда) is a rural locality (a selo) and the administrative center of Gvazdenskoye Rural Settlement, Buturlinovsky District, Voronezh Oblast, Russia. The population was 2,508 as of 2010. There are 27 streets.

== Geography ==
Gvazda is located 14 km southwest of Buturlinovka (the district's administrative centre) by road. Klyopovka is the nearest rural locality.
