= Zelyony, Voronezh Oblast =

Zelyony Зелёный
- Settlement
- Location within Voronezh Oblast Location within Russia
- Coordinates: 50°48′N 40°39′E
- Country: Russia
- Region: Voronezh Oblast
- District: Buturlinovsky District
- Time zone: UTC+3:00

Zelyony (Russian: Зелёный) is a rural locality (a settlement) and the administrative center of Beryozovskoye Rural Settlement, Buturlinovsky District, Voronezh Oblast, Russia. The population was 705 as of 2010. There are 8 streets.

== Geography ==
Zelyony is located 11 km southeast of Buturlinovka (the district's administrative centre) by road. Buturlinovka is the nearest rural locality.
