= Krivoborye =

Krivoborye Кривоборье
- Village
- Location within Voronezh Oblast Location within Russia
- Coordinates: 52°02′N 39°08′E
- Country: Russia
- Region: Voronezh Oblast
- District: Ramonsky District
- Time zone: UTC+3:00

Krivoborye (Russian: Кривоборье) is a rural locality (a village) in Gorozhanskoye Rural Settlement, Ramonsky District, Voronezh Oblast, Russia. The population was 710 as of 2010. There are 3 streets.

== Geography ==
Krivoborye is located 26 km northwest of Ramon (the district's administrative centre) by road. Knyazevo is the nearest rural locality.
