= Dolgo-Makhovatka =

Dolgo-Makhovatka Долго-Маховатка
- Selo
- Location within Voronezh Oblast Location within Russia
- Coordinates: 51°53′N 38°31′E
- Country: Russia
- Region: Voronezh Oblast
- District: Semiluksky District
- Time zone: UTC+3:00

Dolgo-Makhovatka (Russian: Долго-Маховатка) is a rural locality (a selo) in Novosilskoye Rural Settlement, Semiluksky District, Voronezh Oblast, Russia. The population was 69 as of 2010. There are 3 streets.

== Geography ==
Dolgo-Makhovatka is located on the right bank of the Olshanka River, 59 km northwest of Semiluki (the district's administrative centre) by road. Staraya Olshanka is the nearest rural locality.
