= Pchelniki =

Pchelniki Пчельники
- Selo
- Location within Voronezh Oblast Location within Russia
- Coordinates: 51°58′N 39°28′E
- Country: Russia
- Region: Voronezh Oblast
- District: Ramonsky District
- Time zone: UTC+3:00

Pchelniki (Russian: Пчельники) is a rural locality (a selo) in Stupinskoye Rural Settlement, Ramonsky District, Voronezh Oblast, Russia. The population was 56 as of 2010. There are 8 streets.

== Geography ==
Pchelniki is located 17 km northeast of Ramon (the district's administrative centre) by road. Belyayevo is the nearest rural locality.
