= Velikoarkhangelskoye =

Velikoarkhangelskoye Великоархангельское
- Selo
- Location within Voronezh Oblast Location within Russia
- Coordinates: 50°50′N 40°45′E
- Country: Russia
- Region: Voronezh Oblast
- District: Buturlinovsky District
- Time zone: UTC+3:00

Velikoarkhangelskoye (Russian: Великоархангельское) is a rural locality (a selo) and the administrative center of Velikoarkhangelskoye Rural Settlement, Buturlinovsky District, Voronezh Oblast, Russia. In ХІХ century the village an administrative center of Velikoarkhangelskaya volost, Bobrovsky Uyezd, Voronezh Governorate. The population was 1,134 as of 2010. There are 11 streets.

== Geography ==
Velikoarkhangelskoye is located 16 km east of Buturlinovka (the district's administrative centre) by road. Tyunikovo is the nearest rural locality.
