= Yendovishche =

Yendovishche Ендовище
- Selo
- Location within Voronezh Oblast Location within Russia
- Coordinates: 51°43′N 39°00′E
- Country: Russia
- Region: Voronezh Oblast
- District: Semiluksky District
- Time zone: UTC+3:00

Yendovishche (Russian: Ендовище) is a rural locality (a selo) in Semilukskoye Rural Settlement, Semiluksky District, Voronezh Oblast, Russia. The population was 1,933 as of 2010. There are 16 streets.

== Geography ==
Yendovishche is located 8 km north of Semiluki (the district's administrative centre) by road. Semiluki is the nearest rural locality.
