= Razdolye, Voronezh Oblast =

Razdolye Раздолье
- Selo
- Location within Voronezh Oblast Location within Russia
- Coordinates: 51°48′N 38°59′E
- Country: Russia
- Region: Voronezh Oblast
- District: Semiluksky District
- Time zone: UTC+3:00

Razdolye (Russian: Раздолье) is a rural locality (a selo) in Medvezhenskoye Rural Settlement, Semiluksky District, Voronezh Oblast, Russia. The population was 64 as of 2010. There are 3 streets.

== Geography ==
Razdolye is located on the right bank of the Treshchevka River, 17 km north of Semiluki (the district's administrative centre) by road. Privolye is the nearest rural locality.
