= Bolshaya Vereyka =

Bolshaya Vereyka Большая Верейка
- Selo
- Location within Voronezh Oblast Location within Russia
- Coordinates: 52°01′N 38°55′E
- Country: Russia
- Region: Voronezh Oblast
- District: Ramonsky District
- Time zone: UTC+3:00

Bolshaya Vereyka (Russian: Большая Верейка) is a rural locality (a selo) and the administrative center of Bolshevereyskoye Rural Settlement, Ramonsky District, Voronezh Oblast, Russia. The population was 862 as of 2010. There are 11 streets.

== Geography ==
Bolshaya Vereyka is located 46 km northwest of Ramon (the district's administrative centre) by road. Lebyazhye is the nearest rural locality.
