= Losevo, Semiluksky District, Voronezh Oblast =

Losevo Лосево
- Selo
- Location within Voronezh Oblast Location within Russia
- Coordinates: 51°43′N 38°50′E
- Country: Russia
- Region: Voronezh Oblast
- District: Semiluksky District
- Time zone: UTC+3:00

Losevo (Russian: Лосево) is a rural locality (a selo) and the administrative center of Losevskoye Rural Settlement, Semiluksky District, Voronezh Oblast, Russia. The population was 531 as of 2010. There are 8 streets.

== Geography ==
Losevo is located on the left bank of the Veduga River, 25 km northwest of Semiluki (the district's administrative centre) by road. Voznesenka is the nearest rural locality.
