= Vadim Kuleshenko =

Russian footballer

Personal information
- Full name: Vadim Valeryevich Kuleshenko
- Date of birth: 26 June 1966 (age 60)
- Place of birth: Ramon, Russian SFSR
- Height: 1.80 m (5 ft 11 in)
- Position: Forward

Youth career
- FC Torpedo Ramon

Senior career*
Years	Team	Apps	(Gls)
1990–1992	FC Rudgormash Voronezh		
1992	FC Fakel Voronezh	1	(0)
1993–2003	FC Rudgormash Voronezh		
- * Club domestic league appearances and goals

Vadim Valeryevich Kuleshenko (Russian: Вадим Валерьевич Кулешенко; born 26 June 1966 in Ramon) is a former Russian football player.
