= Novosilskoye, Voronezh Oblast =

Novosilskoye Новосильское
- Selo
- Location within Voronezh Oblast Location within Russia
- Coordinates: 51°55′N 38°30′E
- Country: Russia
- Region: Voronezh Oblast
- District: Semiluksky District
- Time zone: UTC+3:00

Novosilskoye (Russian: Новосильское) is a rural locality (a selo) and the administrative center of Novosilskoye Rural Settlement, Semiluksky District, Voronezh Oblast, Russia. The population was 1,038 as of 2010. There are 22 streets.

== Geography ==
Novosilskoye is located 58 km northwest of Semiluki (the district's administrative centre) by road. Dolgo-Makhovatka is the nearest rural locality.
