= Zheleznodorozhny City District, Voronezh =

Zheleznodorozhny district Железнодорожный район (Russian)
- District
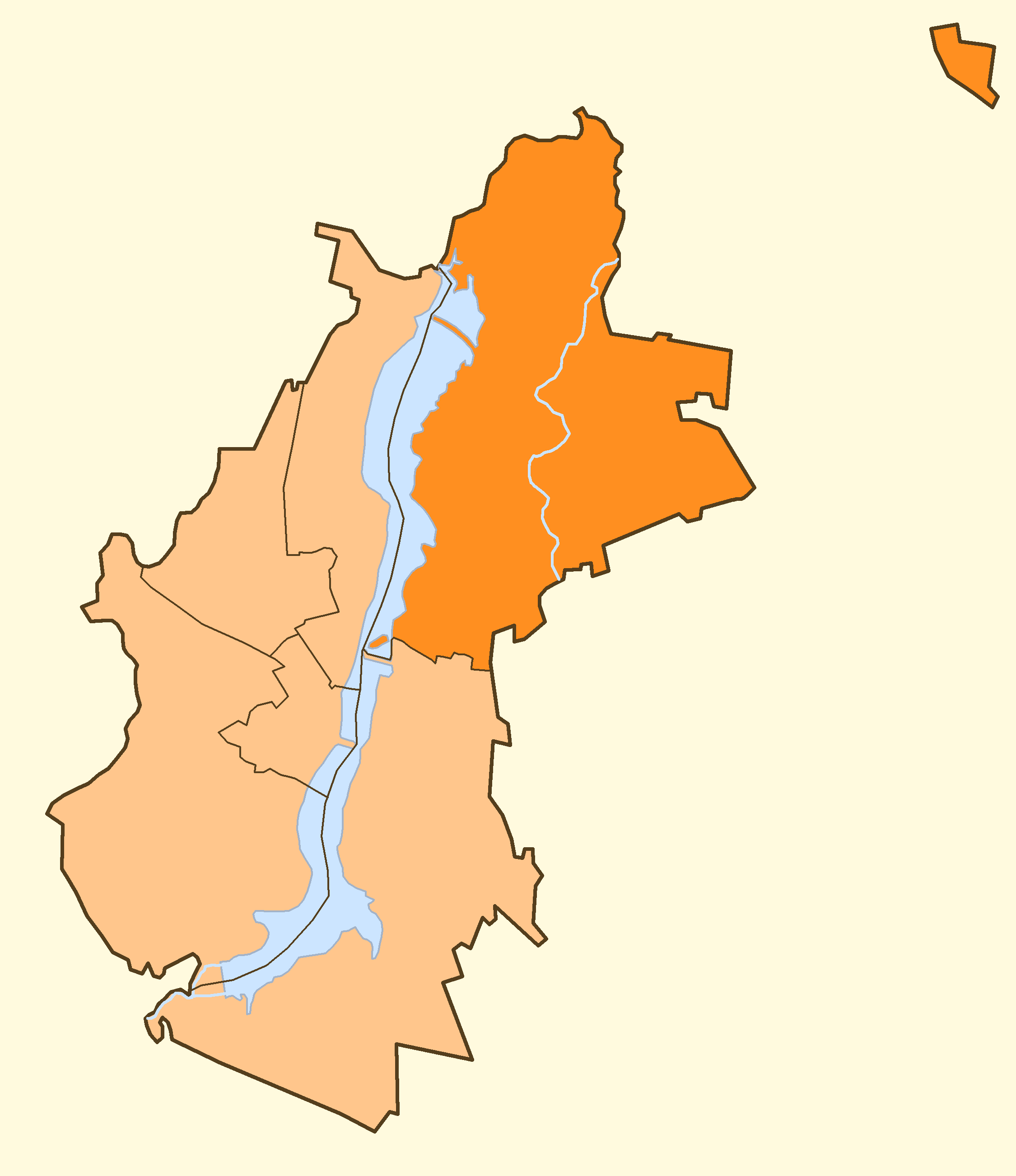
- Zheleznodorozhny district on the map

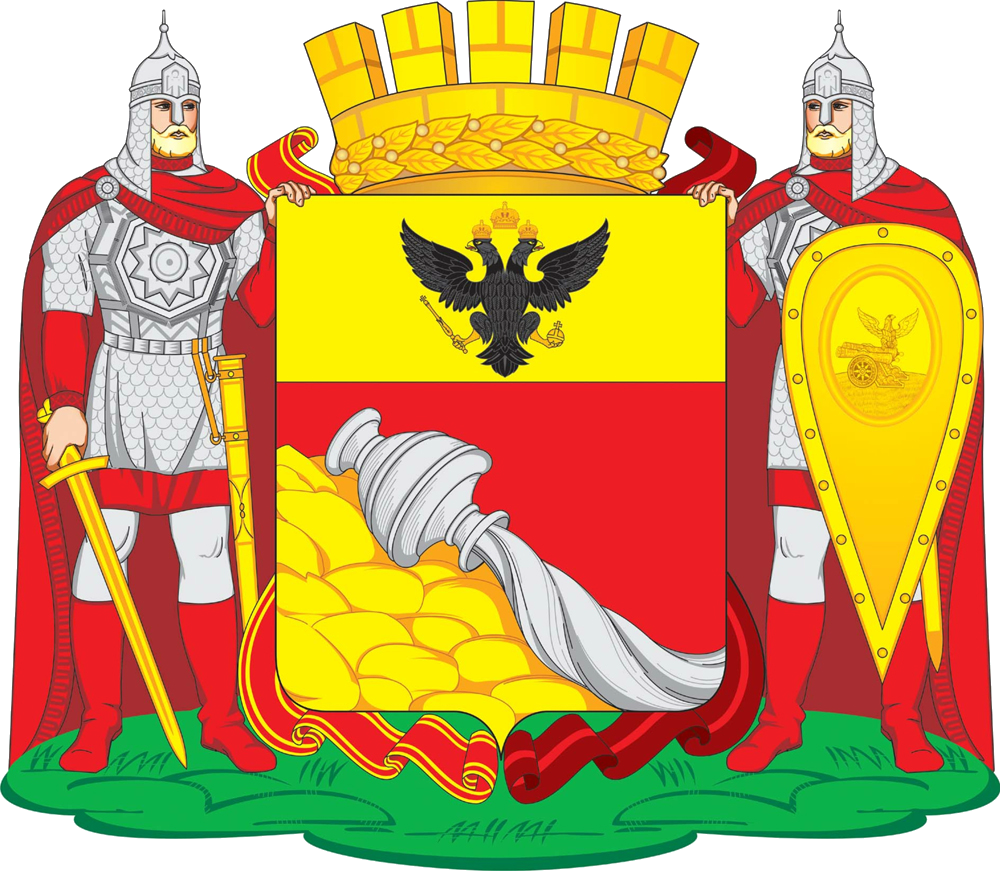
- Coat of arms
- Interactive map of Zheleznodorozhny district
- Coordinates: 51°42′40″N 39°17′25″E
- Country: Russia
- Federal subject: Federal city of Voronezh

Government
  - Type: Local government
  - Head: Leonid Belyaev

Area
  - Total: 183,200 km^{2} (70,700 sq mi)

Population
  - Estimate (2020): 131 651.
- Website: http://www.voronezh-city.ru/administration/structure/detail/11264

Zheleznodorozhny District (Russian: Железнодоро́жный райо́н) is a territorial division (a district, or raion) in Voronezh on the left side of Voronezh water reservoir. The area of the district is 183,200 square kilometers (70,700 sq mi). The total population of the district was 131 651.

The head of Zheleznodorozhny district is Belyaev Leonid Ivanovich.

== Geography ==
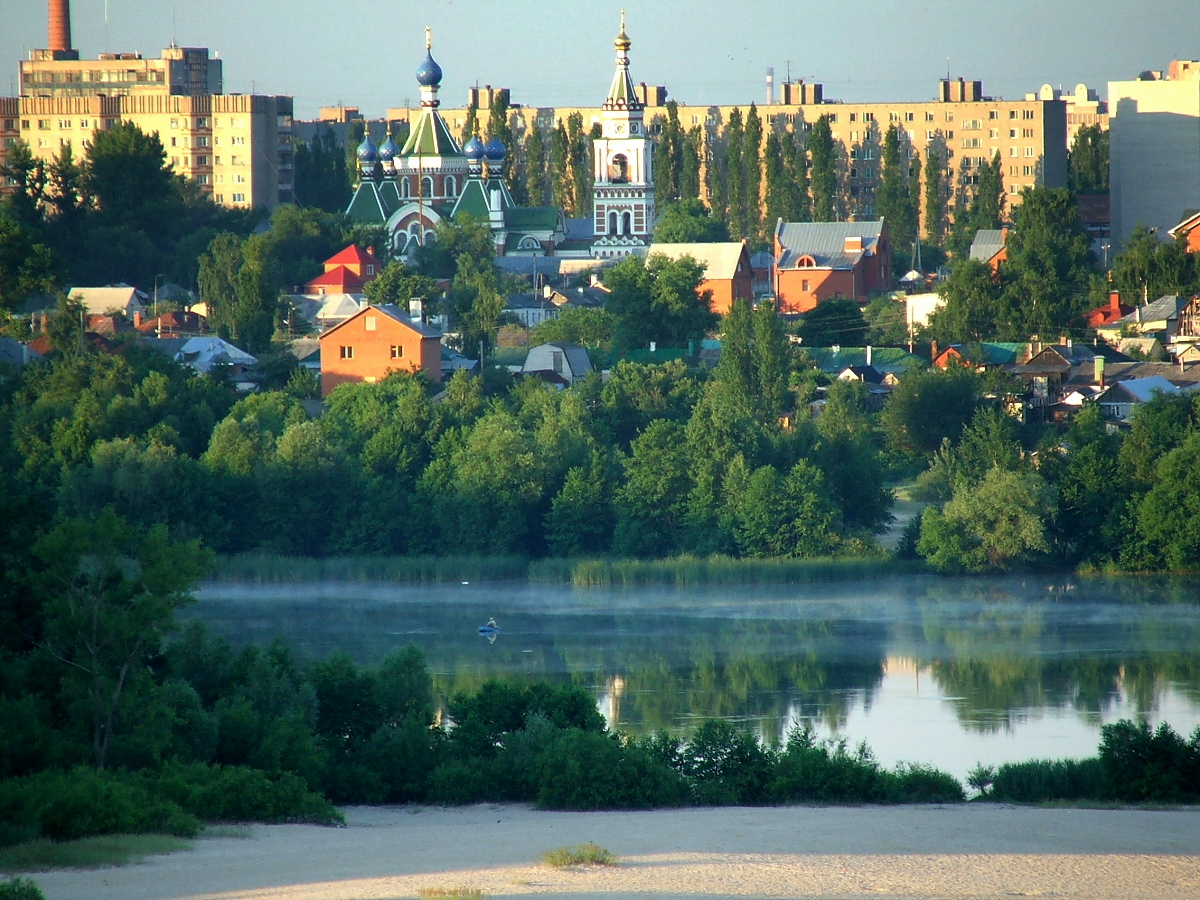
Church of the Kazan Icon of the Mother of God

Zheleznodorozhny district is the largest district of Voronezh. It's located in the northeastern part of Voronezh. It borders on the Levoberezhny District of the city, from the north it borders on Ramonsky District, from the east it borders on Novousmansky District.

It also includes neighborhoods such as Otrozhka, Krasnolesniy and Somovo.

One of the main street in the district is Leninsky Avenue.

== History ==
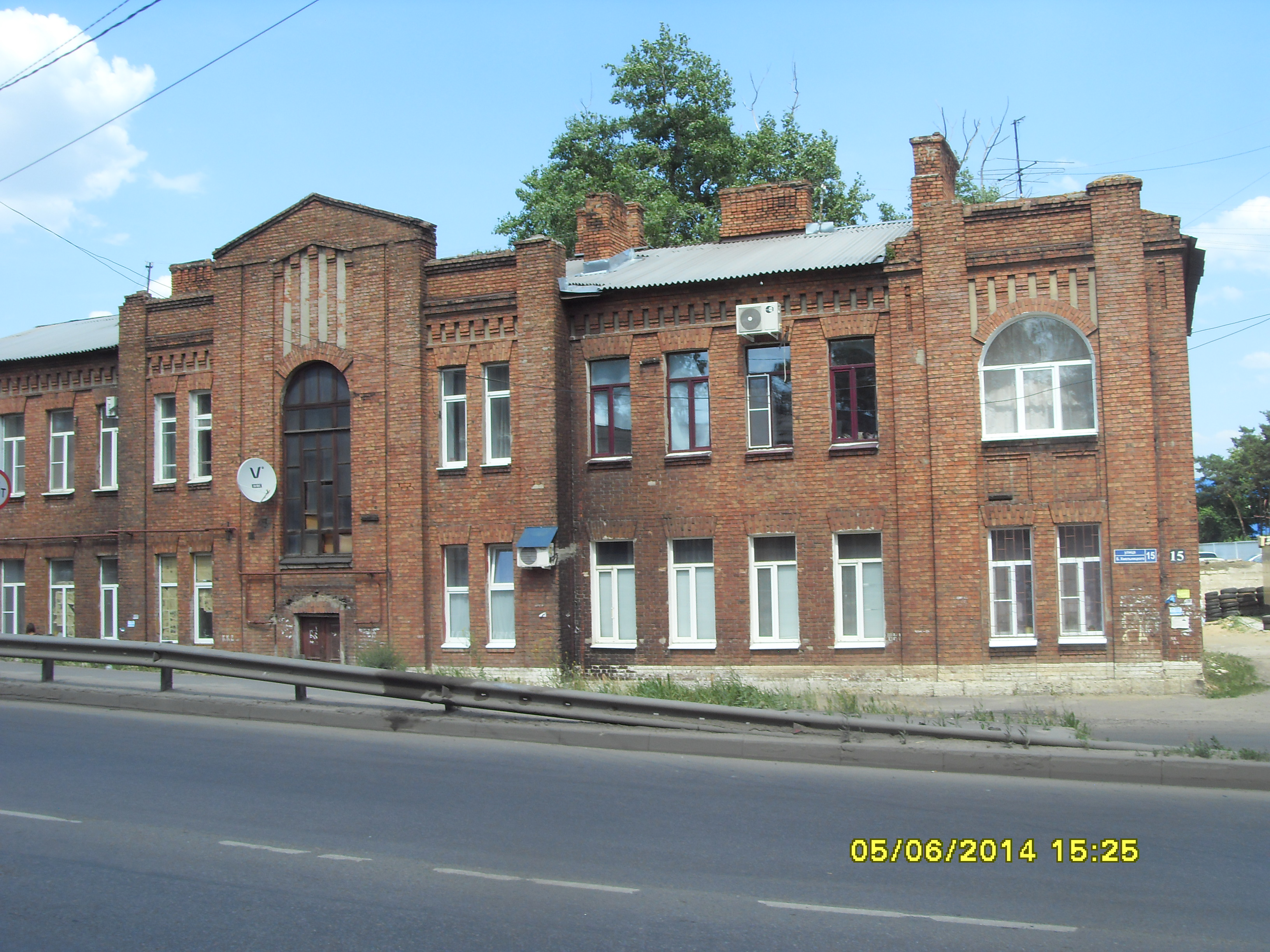
The house of railways workers from the beginning of XX century

Initially the district consisted of two old slobodas, Pridacha and Otrozhka. Zheleznodorozhnyy district was established on 30 April 1936. The local residents themselves divide the district into Bogdanka, Odintsovo, Koldunovka and Otrozhka. There are a lot of gloomy legends related to Koldunovka, which translates to English as "a witchcraft place".
