= Losevo =

Losevo may refer to the following Russian rural localities:

- Losevo, Leningrad Oblast
- Losevo, Semiluksky District, Voronezh Oblast
