= Lomovo, Voronezh Oblast =

Lomovo Ломово
- Selo
- Location within Voronezh Oblast Location within Russia
- Coordinates: 52°02′N 38°49′E
- Country: Russia
- Region: Voronezh Oblast
- District: Ramonsky District
- Time zone: UTC+3:00

Lomovo (Russian: Ломово) is a rural locality (a selo) and the administrative center of Lomovskoye Rural Settlement, Ramonsky District, Voronezh Oblast, Russia. The population was 383 as of 2010. There are 8 streets.

== Geography ==
Lomovo is located 75 km northwest of Ramon (the district's administrative centre) by road. Bolshaya Vereyka is the nearest rural locality.
