= Verhnie Ozerki =

Verhnie Ozerki Верхние Озерки
- village
- Etymology: Upper Ponds
- Interactive map of Verhnie Ozerki
- Coordinates: 50°55′47″N 40°22′39″E
- Country: Russia
- Province: Voronezh
- District: Buturlinovsky
- Rural Settlement: Karaychevskoe

Population (2010)
  - Total: 1
- Time zone: UTC+3
- Postal code: 397533
- Telephone code: 47361
- Postal code: 397533
- OKATO Code: 20 208 836 004
- UTC offset: +3
- Vehicle code: 36, 136
- OKTMO Code: 20 608 436 116

Verhnie Ozerki (Russian: Верхние Озерки, meaning "Upper Ponds") is a village in Russia, in the Buturlinovsky District of Voronezh Oblast. It is part of the Karaychevskoe Rural Settlement.

The population (as of 2010) is one person.
