= Borisoglebsky District, Voronezh Oblast =

Borisoglebsky District Борисоглебский район
- District
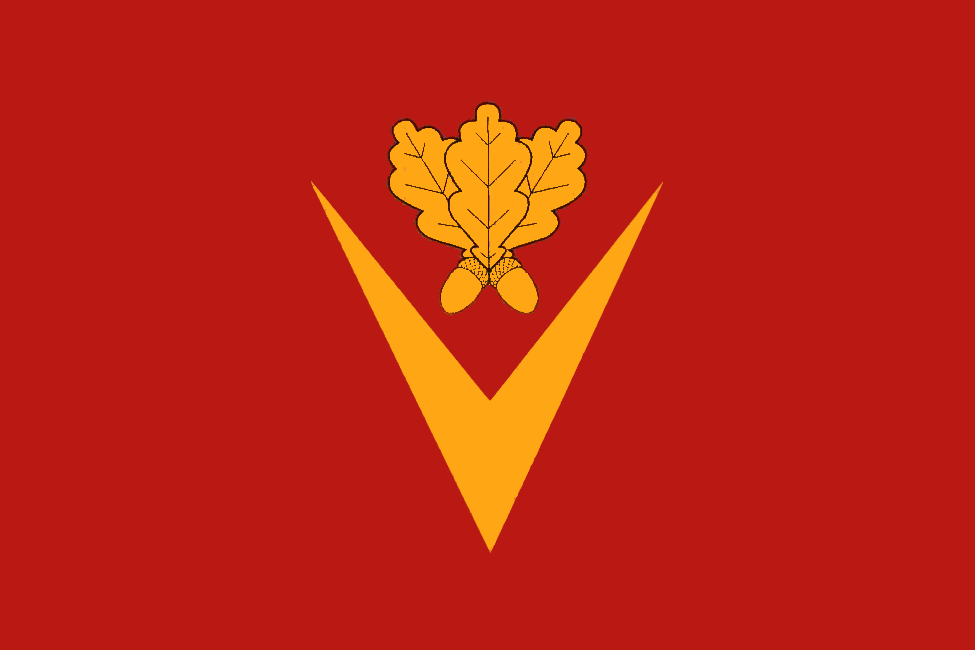
- Flag
- Location of Borisoglebsky District, Voronezh Oblast on the map of Voronezh Oblast
- Coordinates: 51°22′N 42°5′E
- Country: Russia
- Federal subject: Voronezh Oblast
- Established: 2006
- Administrative center: Borisoglebsk
- Time zone: UTC+3 (MSK)
- OKTMO ID: 20710000

Borisoglebsky District (Russian: Борисогле́бский райо́н) was an administrative and municipal district (raion), one of the 32 in Voronezh Oblast, Russia. As of the 2021 Census, its population was 70,407.

== See also ==
- Administrative divisions of Voronezh Oblast
