= Strelitsa =

Strelitsa Стрелица
- Urban-type settlement
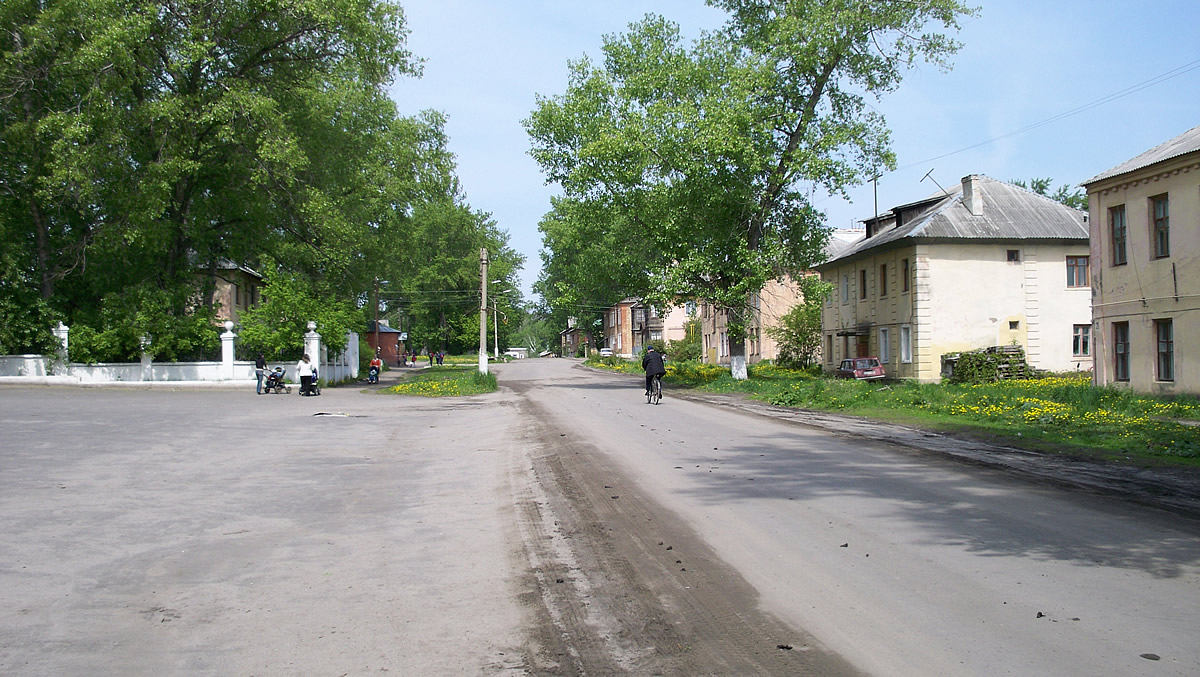

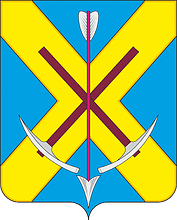
- Coat of arms
- Interactive map of Strelitsa
- Location of Strelitsa Strelitsa (Voronezh Oblast)
- Coordinates: 51.6094°N 38.9058°E
- Country: Russia
- Federal subject: Voronezh Oblast
- Administrative district: Semiluksky District

Population (2010 Census)
  - Total: 3,937
  - Estimate (2021): 4,008 (+1.8%)
- Time zone: UTC+3 (MSK)
- Postal code: 396941
- OKTMO ID: 20649165051

Strelitsa (Russian: Стрелица) is an urban locality (an urban-type settlement) in Semiluksky District of Voronezh Oblast, Russia. Population: 4,008 (2021 census); 3,937 (2010 census); 4,828 (2002 census); 4,569 (1989 Soviet census).
