= Nizhny Kislyay =

Nizhny Kislyay Нижний Кисляй
- Urban-type settlement
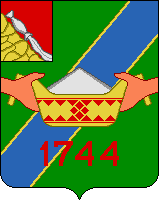
- Coat of arms
- Interactive map of Nizhny Kislyay
- Location of Nizhny Kislyay Nizhny Kislyay (Voronezh Oblast)
- Coordinates: 50.8564°N 40.1693°E
- Country: Russia
- Federal subject: Voronezh Oblast
- Administrative district: Buturlinovsky District

Population (2010 Census)
  - Total: 3,967
  - Estimate (2021): 3,156 (−20.4%)
- Time zone: UTC+3 (MSK)
- Postal code: 397535
- OKTMO ID: 20608160051

Nizhny Kislyay (Russian: Нижний Кисляй) is an urban locality (an urban-type settlement) in Buturlinovsky District of Voronezh Oblast, Russia. Population: 3,158 (2021 census); 3,967 (2010 census); 4,456 (2002 census); 4,469 (1989 Soviet census).
