= Somovo =

Somovskoe Сомово
- Selo
- Location within Voronezh Oblast Location within Russia
- Coordinates: 51°56′N 38°48′E
- Country: Russia
- Region: Voronezh Oblast
- District: Ramonsky District
- Time zone: UTC+3:00

Somovo (Russian: Сомово) is a rural locality (a selo) and the administrative center of Somovskoye Rural Settlement, Ramonsky District, Voronezh Oblast, Russia. The population was 547 as of 2010. There are 6 streets.

== Geography ==
Somovo is located 47 km west of Ramon (the district's administrative centre) by road. Gremyachye is the nearest rural locality.
