= Latnaya =

Latnaya Латная
- Urban-type settlement
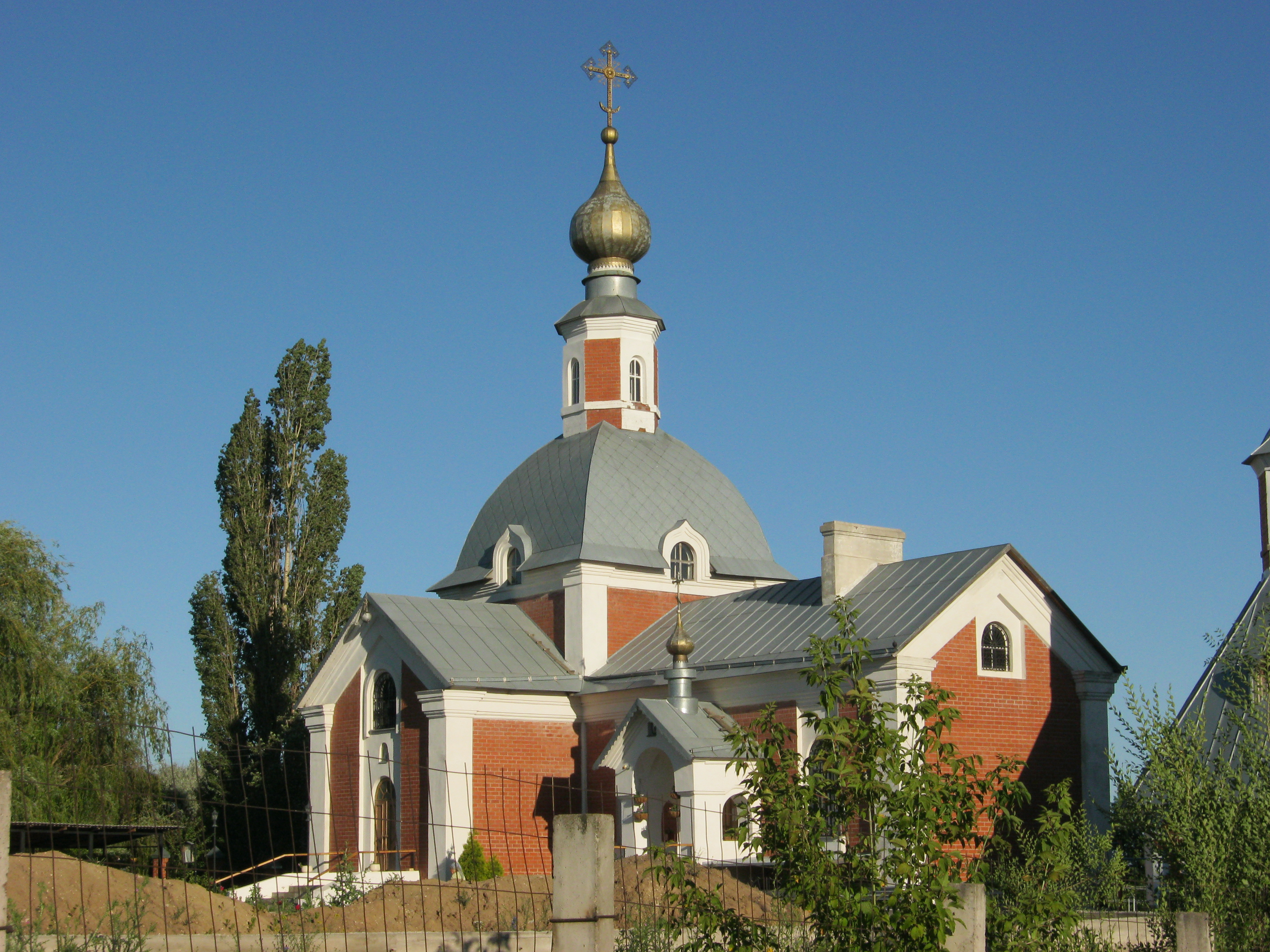

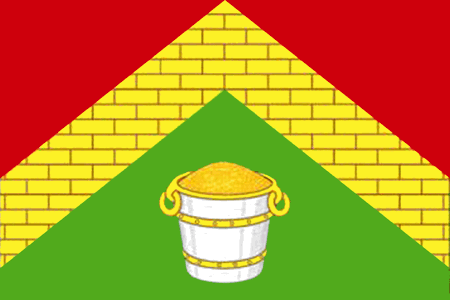
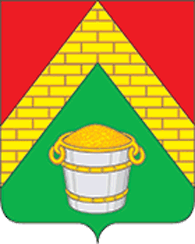
- Flag Coat of arms
- Interactive map of Latnaya
- Location of Latnaya Latnaya (Voronezh Oblast)
- Coordinates: 51.6571°N 38.9019°E
- Country: Russia
- Federal subject: Voronezh Oblast
- Administrative district: Semiluksky District
- Founded: 1887

Population (2010 Census)
  - Total: 7,528
  - Estimate (2021): 7,285 (−3.2%)
- Time zone: UTC+3 (MSK)
- Postal code: 396950
- OKTMO ID: 20649160051

Latnaya (Russian: Латная) is an urban locality (an urban-type settlement) in Semiluksky District of Voronezh Oblast, Russia. Population: 7,285 (2021 census); 7,528 (2010 census); 7,333 (2002 census); 7,496 (1989 Soviet census).
