= Osered =

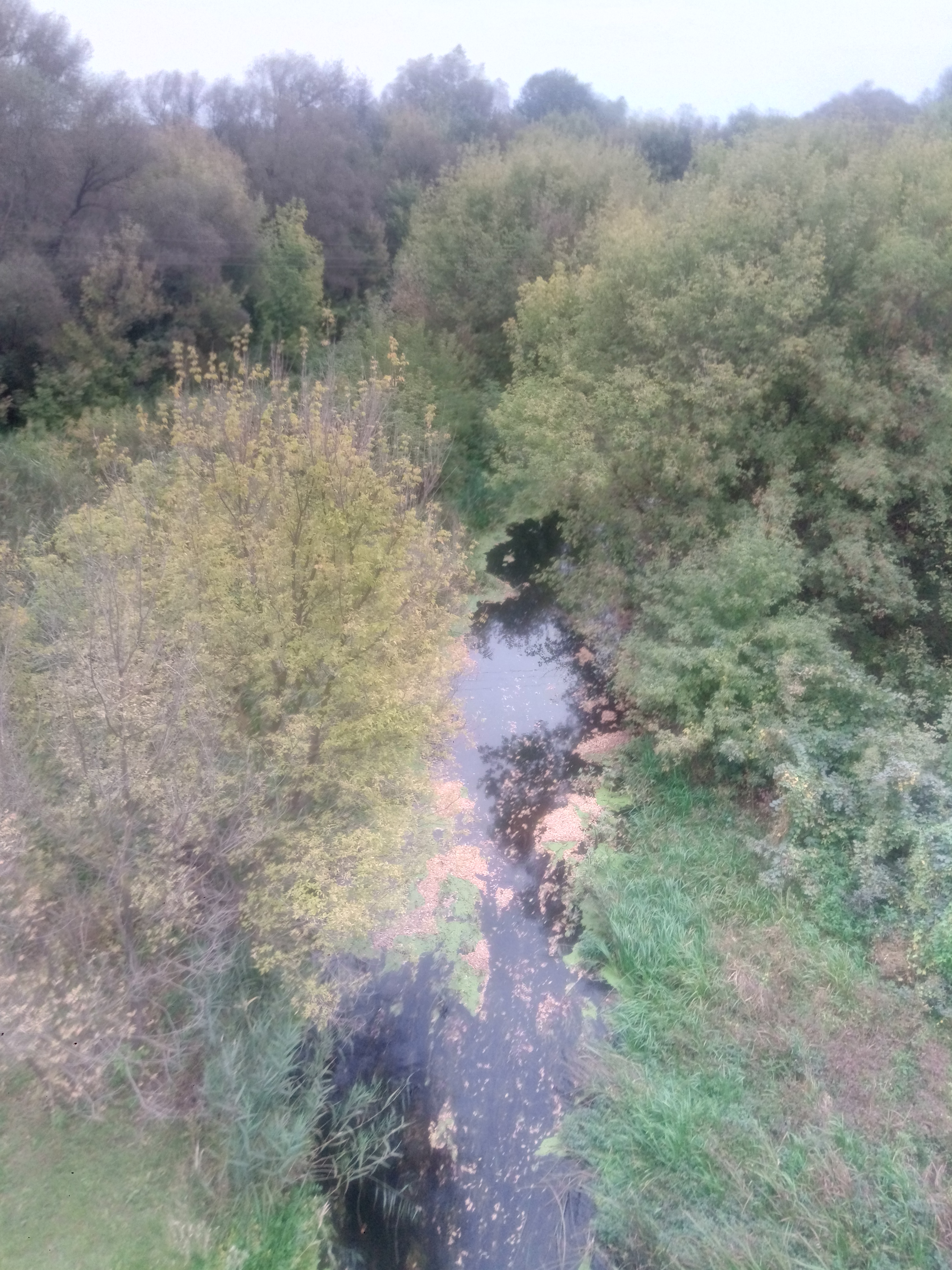
- Intersection between Osered and M4 highway
- Native name: Осередь (Russian)

Location
- Country: Russia

Physical characteristics
- Mouth: Don
  - coordinates: 50°27′16″N 40°05′16″E
- Length: 89 km (55 mi)
- Basin size: 2,420 km^{2} (930 sq mi)

Basin features
- Progression: Don→ Sea of Azov

The Osered (Russian: Осере́дь) is a river in Voronezh Oblast in Russia. It is a tributary of the Don. It has a total length of 89 km (55 mi) and a drainage area of 2,420 km^{2} (930 sq mi).
