= Perelyoshinsky =

Pereleshinsky Перелёшинский
- Urban-type settlement
- Interactive map of Pereleshinsky
- Location of Pereleshinsky Pereleshinsky (Voronezh Oblast)
- Coordinates: 51.7149°N 40.1992°E
- Country: Russia
- Federal subject: Voronezh Oblast
- Administrative district: Paninsky District

Population (2010 Census)
  - Total: 3,122
  - Estimate (2021): 2,577 (−17.5%)
- Time zone: UTC+3 (MSK)
- Postal code: 396160
- OKTMO ID: 20635160051

Pereleshinsky (Russian: Перелёшинский) is an urban locality (an urban-type settlement) in Paninsky District of Voronezh Oblast, Russia. Population: 2,577 (2021 census); 3,122 (2010 census); 3,303 (2002 census); 3,611 (1989 Soviet census).
