= Yelan-Kolenovsky =

Yelan-Kolenovsky Елань-Коленовский
- Urban-type settlement
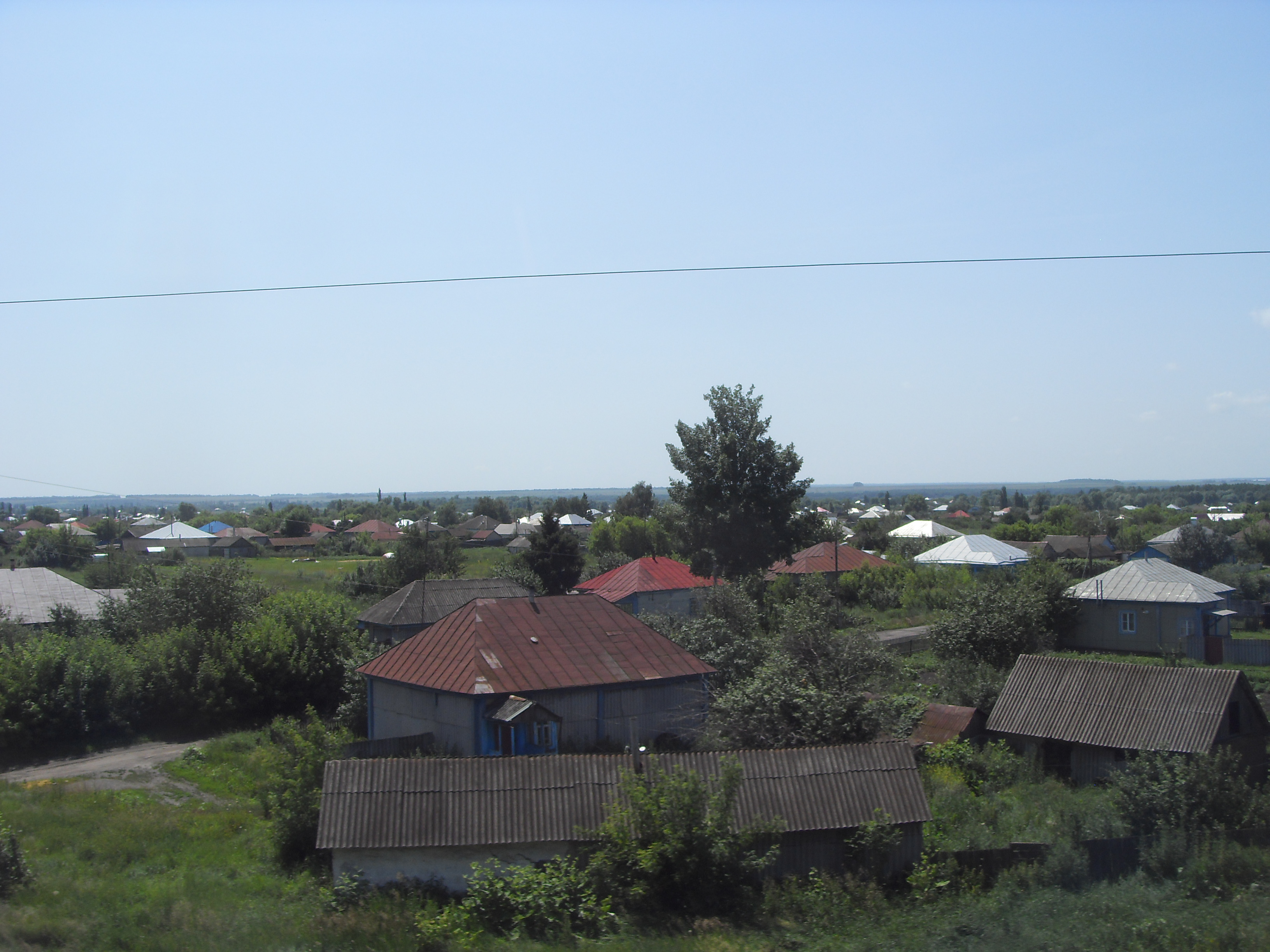

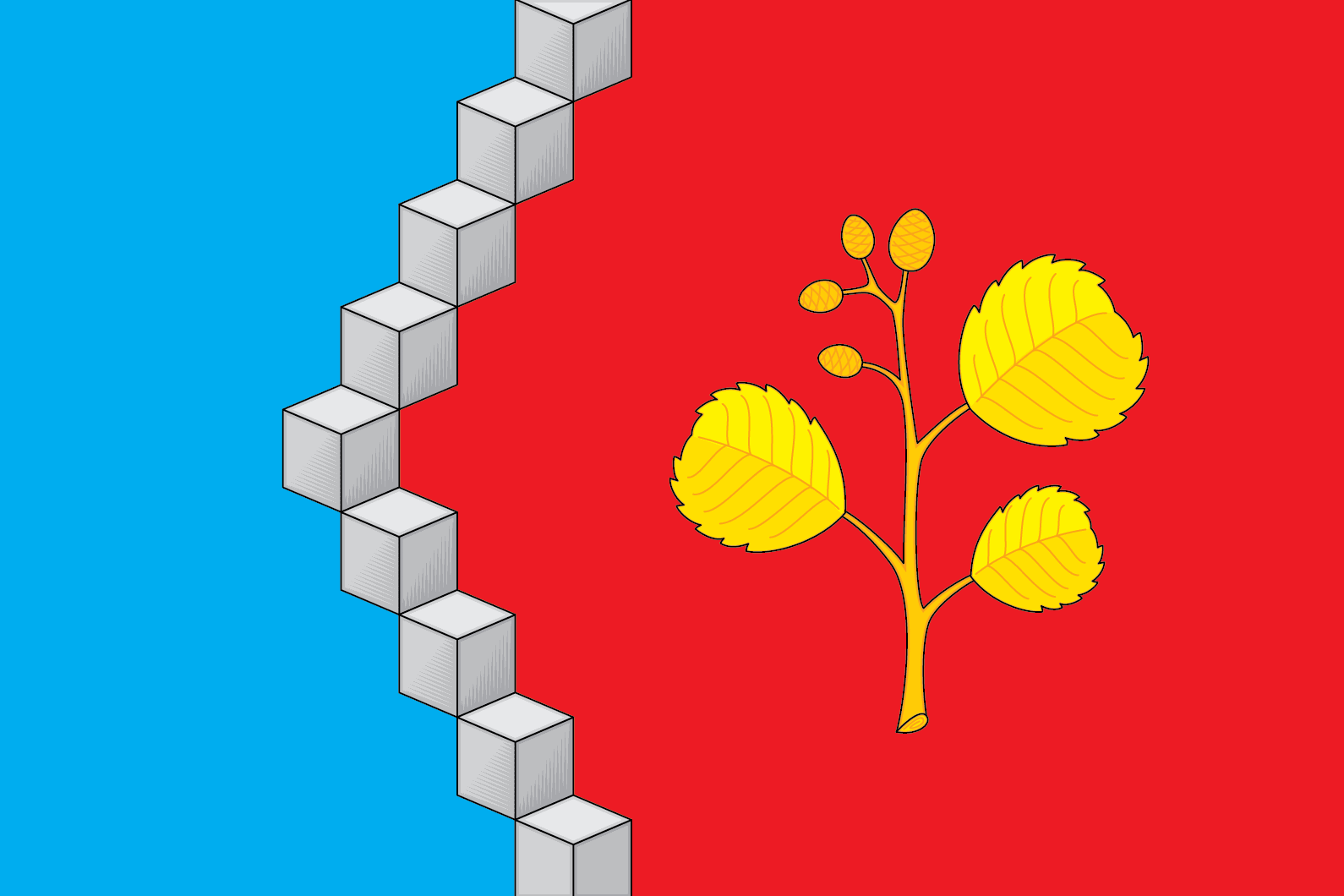
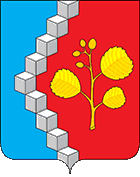
- Flag Coat of arms
- Interactive map of Yelan-Kolenovsky
- Location of Yelan-Kolenovsky Yelan-Kolenovsky (Voronezh Oblast)
- Coordinates: 51.1626°N 41.1514°E
- Country: Russia
- Federal subject: Voronezh Oblast
- Administrative district: Novokhopyorsky District

Population (2010 Census)
  - Total: 3,916
  - Estimate (2021): 3,274 (−16.4%)
- Time zone: UTC+3 (MSK)
- Postal code: 397431
- OKTMO ID: 20627160051

Yelan-Kolenovsky (Russian: Елань-Коленовский) is an urban locality (an urban-type settlement) in Novokhopyorsky District of Voronezh Oblast, Russia. Population: 3,274 (2021 census); 3,916 (2010 census); 4,170 (2002 census); 5,085 (1989 Soviet census).
