= Veduga =

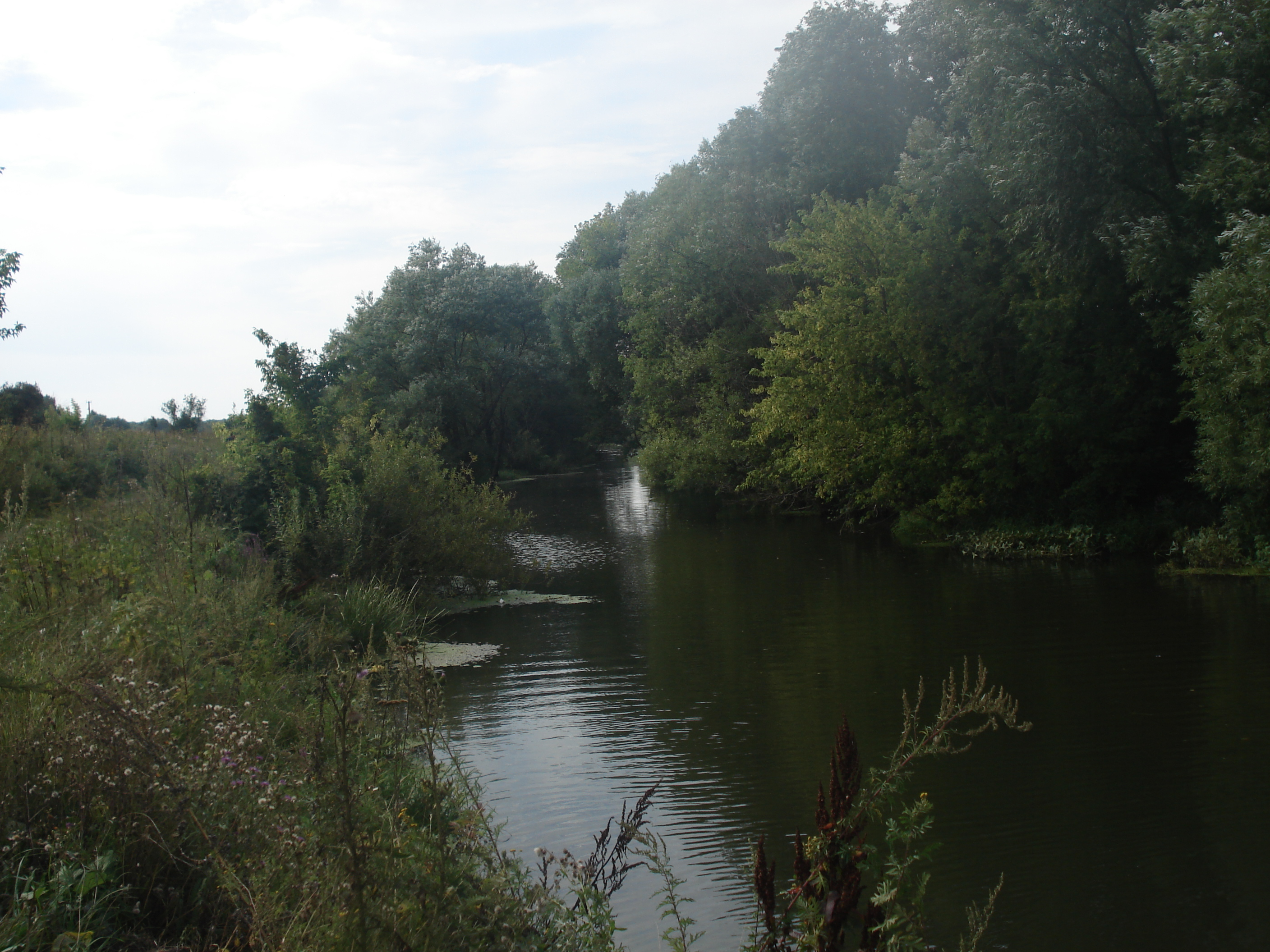
- Native name: Ведуга (Russian)

Location
- Country: Russia

Physical characteristics
- Mouth: Don
  - coordinates: 51.7515°N 39.0784°E
- Length: 94 km (58 mi)
- Basin size: 1,570 km^{2} (610 sq mi)

Basin features
- Progression: Don→ Sea of Azov

The Veduga (Russian: Ве́дуга) is a right tributary of the river Don, flowing through the northwestern corner of Voronezh Oblast in Russia. It is 94 kilometres (58 mi) long, and has a drainage basin of 1,570 square kilometres (610 sq mi). It is meandering, never wider than 15 metres (49 ft), and never deeper than 3 metres (10 ft). There are settlements almost continuously along its banks; the nearest large town is Semiluki.
