= Lomovo, Belgorod Oblast =

Lomovo Ломово
- Selo
- Location within Belgorod Oblast Location within Russia
- Coordinates: 50°44′N 36°56′E
- Country: Russia
- Region: Belgorod Oblast
- District: Korochansky District
- Time zone: UTC+3:00

Lomovo (Russian: Ломово) is a rural locality (a selo) and the administrative center of Lomovskoye Rural Settlement, Korochansky District, Belgorod Oblast, Russia. The population was 904 as of 2010. There are 8 streets.

== Geography ==
Lomovo is located 21 km southwest of Korocha (the district's administrative centre) by road. Gremyachye is the nearest rural locality.
