= Lomovo, Bashkortostan =

Lomovo Ломово
- Village
- Location within Bashkortostan Location within Russia
- Coordinates: 54°51′N 54°47′E
- Country: Russia
- Region: Bashkortostan
- District: Blagovarsky District
- Time zone: UTC+5:00

Lomovo (Russian: Ломово) is a rural locality (a village) in Kucherbayevsky Selsoviet, Blagovarsky District, Bashkortostan, Russia. The population was 107 as of 2010. There are 2 streets.

== Geography ==
Lomovo is located 43 km northwest of Yazykovo (the district's administrative centre) by road. Klimentovka is the nearest rural locality.
