= Buturlinovka =

Town in Voronezh Oblast, Russia

Buturlinovka Бутурлиновка
- Town
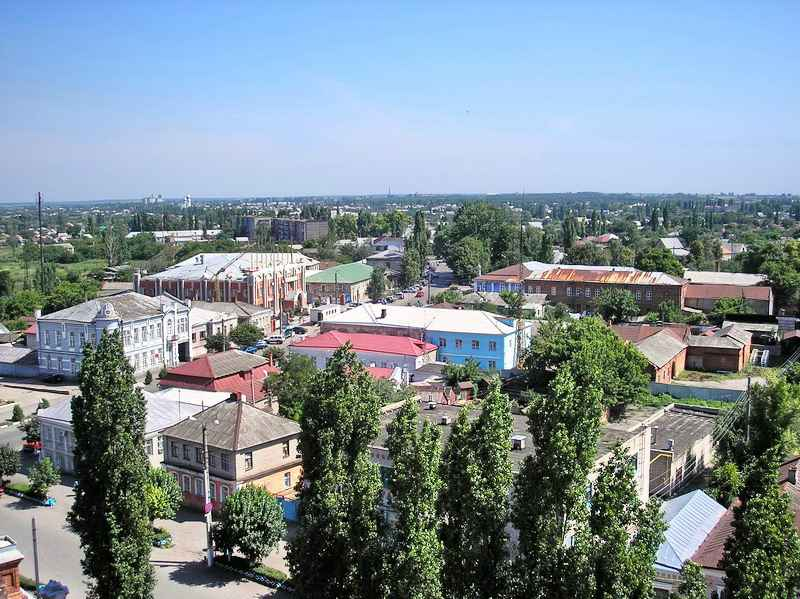
- View of central Buturlinovka

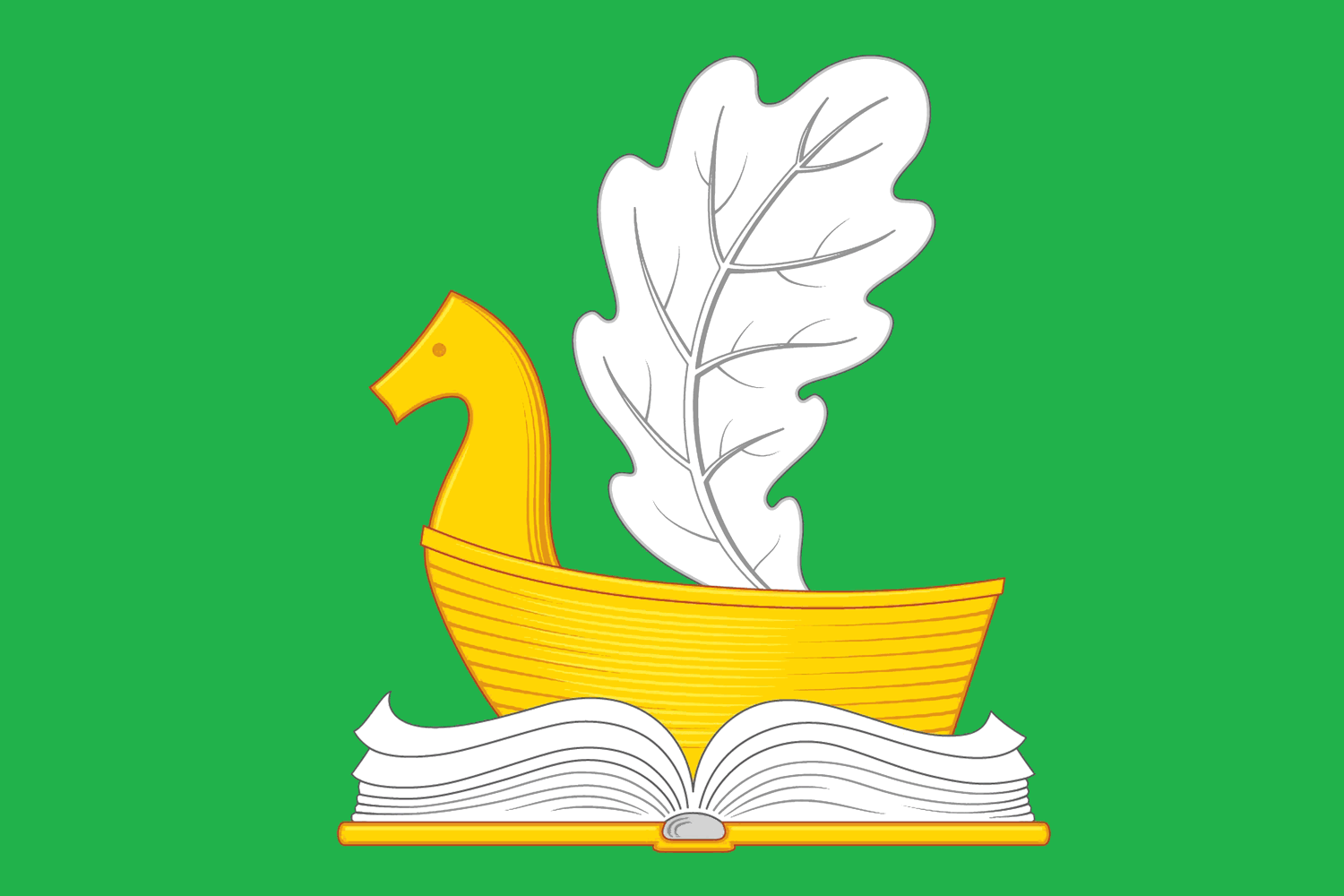
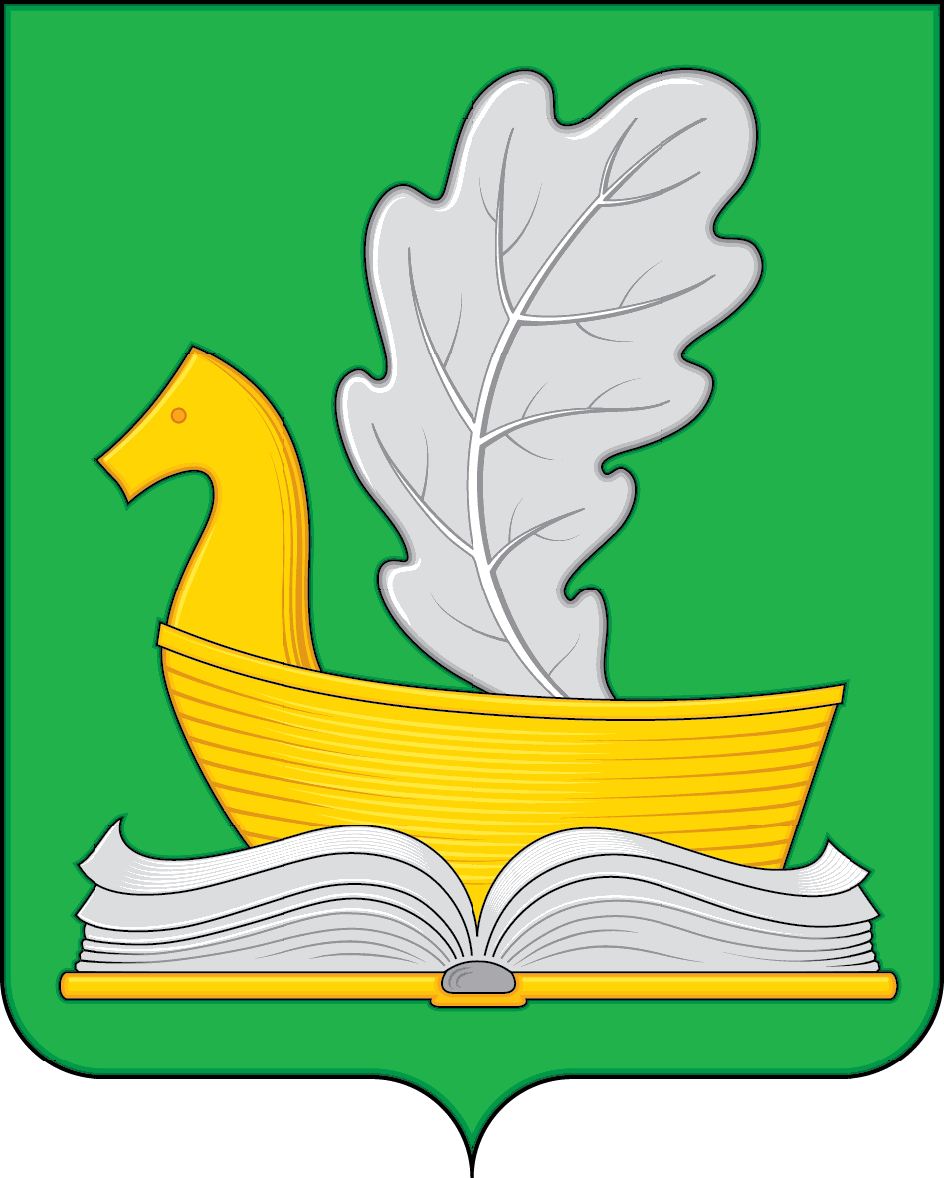
- Flag Coat of arms
- Interactive map of Buturlinovka
- Location of Buturlinovka Buturlinovka (Voronezh Oblast)
- Coordinates: 50°50′N 40°35′E
- Country: Russia
- Federal subject: Voronezh Oblast
- Administrative district: Buturlinovsky District
- Urban settlementSelsoviet: Buturlinovskoye
- Founded: 1740
- Town status since: 1917
- Elevation: 120 m (390 ft)

Population (2010 Census)
  - Total: 27,208
  - Estimate (2025): 23,648 (−13.1%)

Administrative status
  - Capital of: Buturlinovsky District, Buturlinovskoye Urban Settlement

Municipal status
  - Municipal district: Buturlinovsky Municipal District
  - Urban settlement: Buturlinovskoye Urban Settlement
  - Capital of: Buturlinovsky Municipal District, Buturlinovskoye Urban Settlement
- Time zone: UTC+3 (MSK)
- Postal codes: 397500–397507, 397549
- OKTMO ID: 20608101001

Buturlinovka (Russian: Бутурли́новка) is a town in Voronezh Oblast, Russia, on the Ossered River, a tributary of the Don. It serves as the administrative center of Buturlinovsky District. Its population as of 2021 was 24,397.

== History ==
It was founded in 1740 as a sloboda inhabited by settlers from Left-bank Ukraine. After the settlement was transferred into the ownership of count Buturlin, in 1766 local residents staged a rebellion against enserfment. Under the Tsarist rule Buturlinovka was the biggest village of Voronezh Governorate, and local population engaged in handicrafts. Town status was granted to Buturlinovka in 1917.

The settlement represented the northeasternmost part of Ukrainian ethnic territory, with 85% of its population of 28,000 identifying as Ukrainians (according to the 1926 Soviet census). Its population has shrunk throughout the past 30 years, as per the Russian census: 24,397 (2021 census); 27,208 (2010 census); 28,627 (2002 census); 29,258 (1989 Soviet census)..

== Administrative and municipal status ==
Buturlinovka lies about 137 kilometers (85 mi) southeast from Voronezh, the center of the oblast. Within the framework of administrative divisions, Buturlinovka serves as the administrative center of Buturlinovsky District. As an administrative division, it is, together with three rural localities in Buturlinovsky District, incorporated within Buturlinovsky District as Buturlinovskoye Urban Settlement. As a municipal division, this administrative unit also has urban settlement status and is a part of Buturlinovsky Municipal District.

== Military ==
Buturlinovka air base is situated 4 kilometers (2.5 mi) south of the town.
