= Buturlinovsky District =

Buturlinovsky District Бутурлиновский район (Russian)
- District
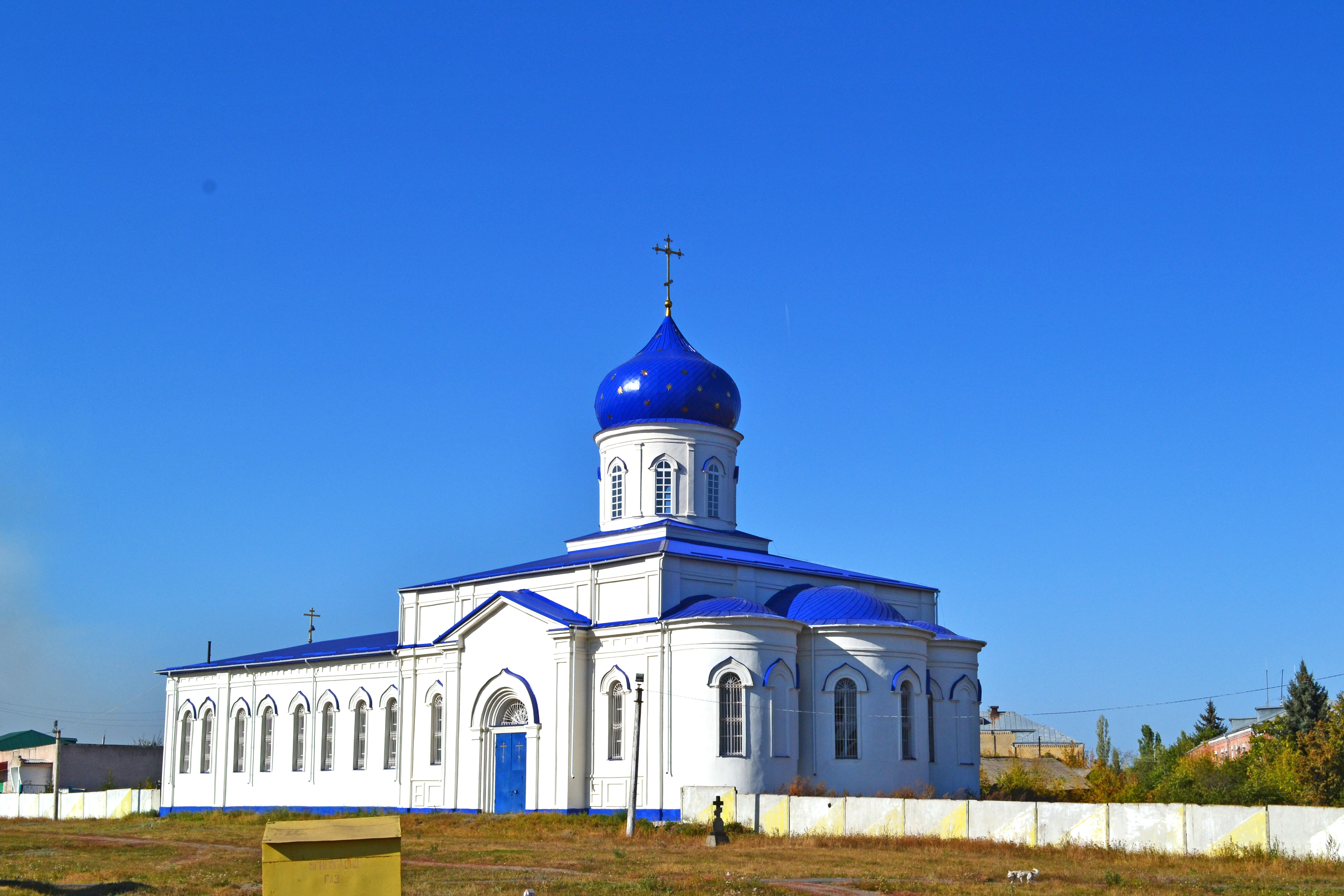
- Exaltation of the Holy Cross Church, Buturlinovka

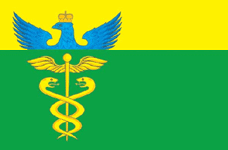
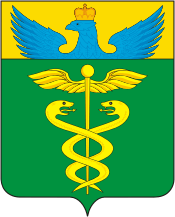
- Flag Coat of arms
- Location of Buturlinovsky District in Voronezh Oblast
- Coordinates: 50°49′30″N 40°35′20″E
- Country: Russia
- Federal subject: Voronezh Oblast
- Established: 30 July 1928
- Administrative center: Buturlinovka

Area
  - Total: 1,802 km^{2} (696 sq mi)

Population (2010 Census)
  - Total: 52,575
  - Density: 29.18/km^{2} (75.57/sq mi)
  - Urban: 59.3%
  - Rural: 40.7%

Administrative structure
  - Administrative divisions: 1 Urban settlements (towns), 1 Urban settlements (urban-type settlements), 14 Rural settlements
  - Inhabited localities: 1 cities/towns, 1 urban-type settlements, 40 rural localities

Municipal structure
  - Municipally incorporated as: Buturlinovsky Municipal District
  - Municipal divisions: 2 urban settlements, 14 rural settlements
- Time zone: UTC+3 (MSK)
- OKTMO ID: 20608000
- Website: http://www.butur-rn.ru/

Buturlinovsky District (Russian: Бутурли́новский райо́н) is an administrative and municipal district (raion), one of the thirty-two in Voronezh Oblast, Russia. It is located in the center of the oblast. The area of the district is 1,802 square kilometers (696 sq mi). Its administrative center is the town of Buturlinovka. Population: 44,139 (2021 census); 52,575 (2010 census); 57,204 (2002 census); 60,915 (1989 Soviet census). The population of Buturlinovka accounts for 55.3% of the district's total population.
