= Semiluki =

Town in Voronezh Oblast, Russia

Semiluki Семилуки
- Town
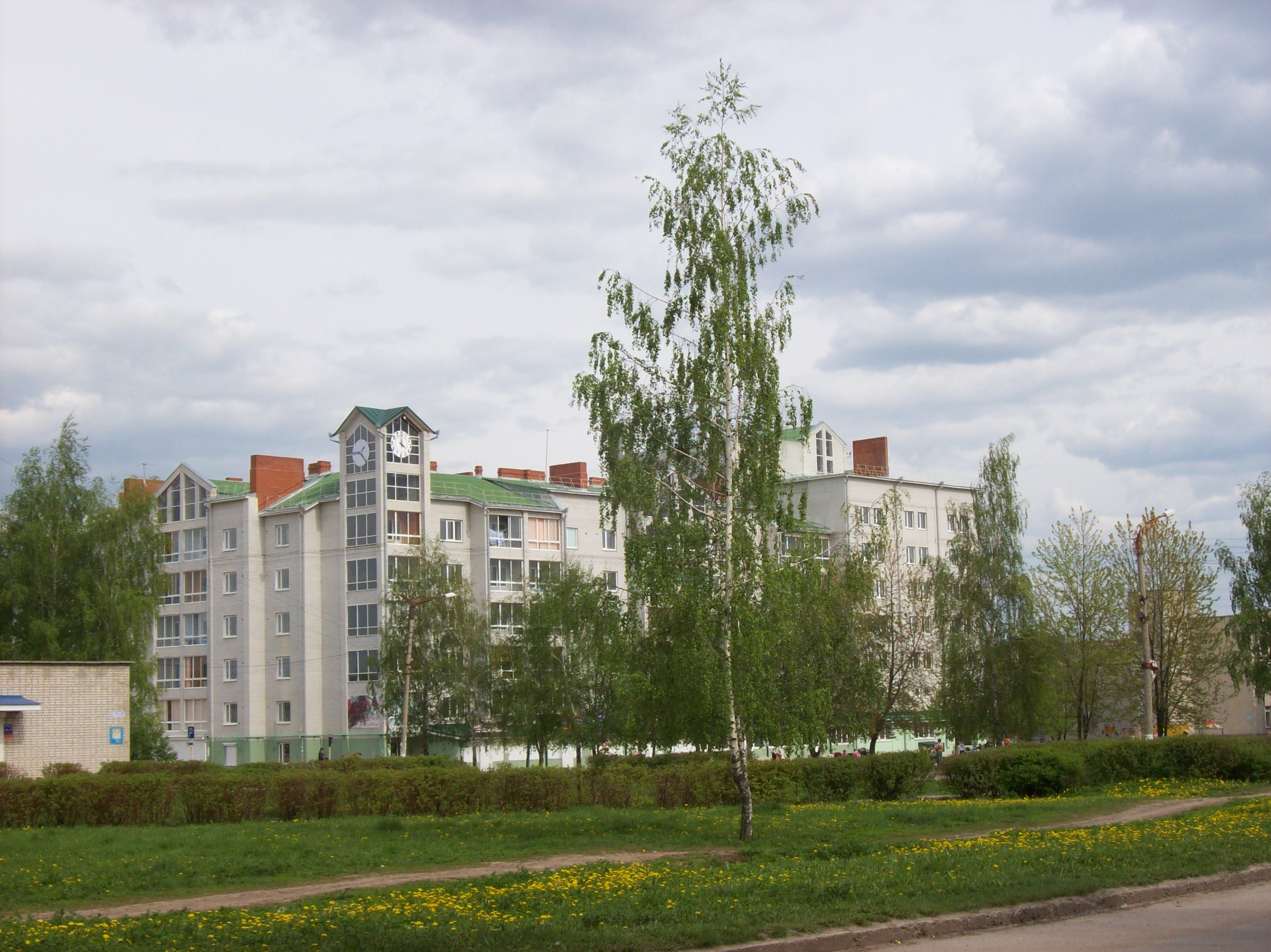
- In Semiluki

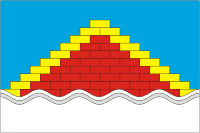
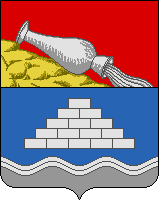
- Flag Coat of arms
- Interactive map of Semiluki
- Location of Semiluki Semiluki (Voronezh Oblast)
- Coordinates: 51°41′N 39°02′E
- Country: Russia
- Federal subject: Voronezh Oblast
- Administrative district: Semiluksky District
- Urban settlementSelsoviet: Semiluki
- Founded: 1894
- Town status since: 1954
- Elevation: 130 m (430 ft)

Population (2010 Census)
  - Total: 26,023
  - Estimate (2025): 28,103 (+8%)

Administrative status
  - Capital of: Semiluksky District, Semiluki Urban Settlement

Municipal status
  - Municipal district: Semiluksky Municipal District
  - Urban settlement: Semiluki Urban Settlement
  - Capital of: Semiluksky Municipal District, Semiluki Urban Settlement
- Time zone: UTC+3 (MSK)
- Postal codes: 396900–396902, 396959
- OKTMO ID: 20649101001
- Website: semiluki-gorod.ru

Semiluki (Russian: Семилу́ки) is a town and the administrative center of Semiluksky District in Voronezh Oblast, Russia, located on the Don River. Population 27,938 (2021 census); 26,023 (2010 census); 25,559 (2002 census); 21,650 (1989 Soviet census).

== Paleontology ==
In the spring of 1984, on the right bank of the Veduga River, 4 km north of Semiluki, students of the Geological Faculty of Voronezh State University found an incomplete sketeton of ichthyosaur during their field work. Remains, including bones of skull, a fragmentary coracoid, limbs, incomplete vertebral column and ribs, were collected from the glauconitic–quartz sand, whose age is set in the range from Albian to Cenomanian (Cretaceous). In 2008, this animal was named Platypterygius ochevi, after the paleozoologist and professor Vitalii Ochev. In 2020, this naming was declared a junior synonym of Maiaspondylus cantabrigiensis.

== History ==
It was founded in 1894 near the Semiluki railway station, which was named after the nearby village. In 1929, the main enterprise of the settlement, a factory of fireproof materials (now JSC "Semiluksky refractory plant"), was built. In 1931, Semiluki became the administrative center of Semiluksky District. In July 1942, it was occupied by Nazi Germany. It was liberated on January 25, 1943. A factory of fireproof materials was almost completely destroyed by the Nazis. Town status was granted to Semiluki in 1954.

== Administrative and municipal status ==
Within the framework of administrative divisions, Semiluki serves as the administrative center of Semiluksky District. As an administrative division, it is incorporated within Semiluksky District as Semiluki Urban Settlement. As a municipal division, this administrative unit also has urban settlement status and is a part of Semiluksky Municipal District.

=== Informal divisions ===
As most other towns in Russia, Semiluki is divided into microdistricts for town planning purposes. The microdistricts bear proper names; however, an informal and traditional system of dividing the town into residential areas also exists. Many such areas also have informal names, and some of those names are used in official documents together with, or instead of, the official names. Severny 1 Microdistrict, for example, is commonly known as Pole chudes (lit. the field of wonders).
