= Semiluksky District =

Semiluksky District Семилукский район (Russian)
- District
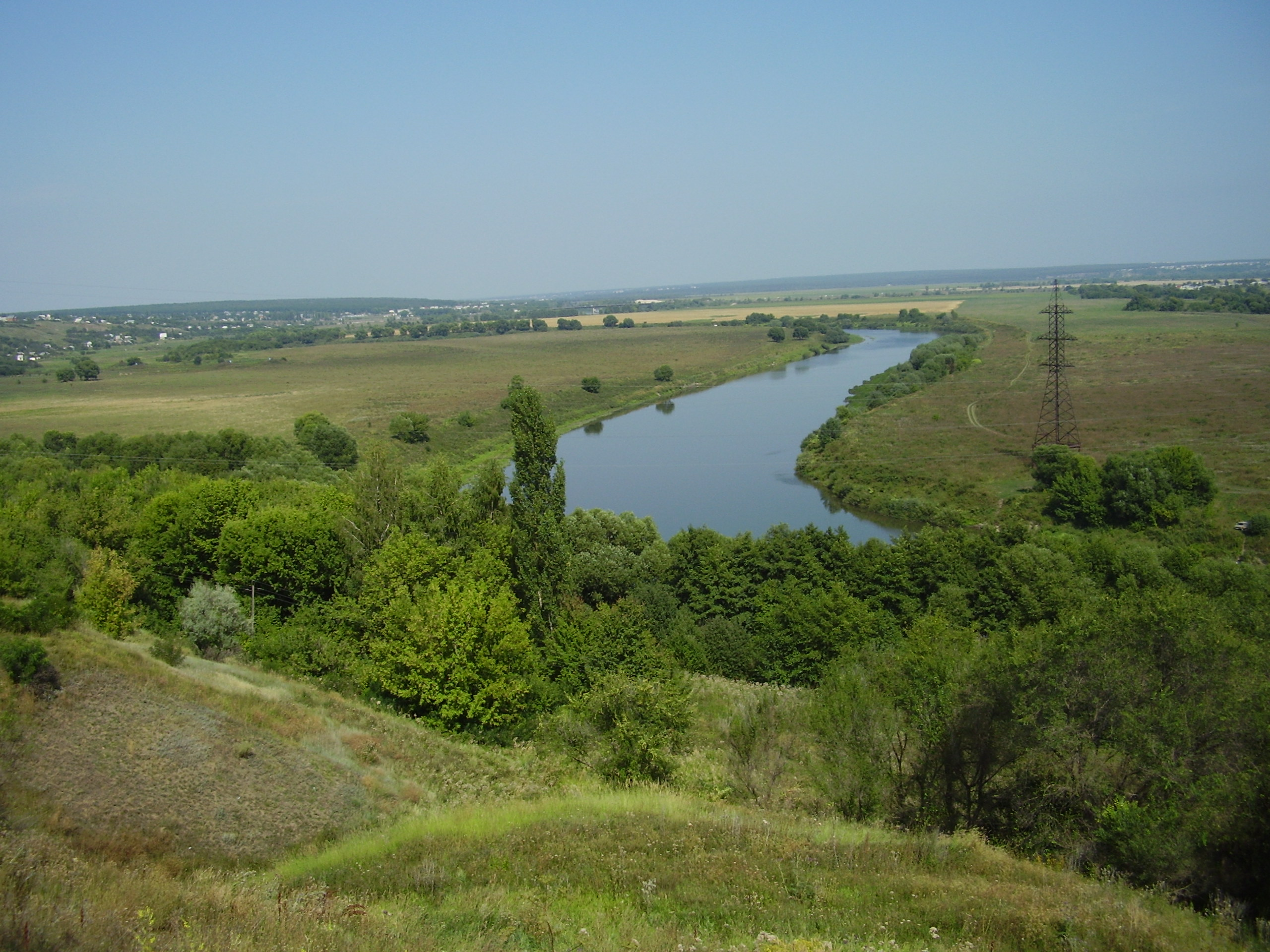
- Don River in Semiluksky District

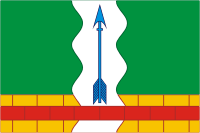
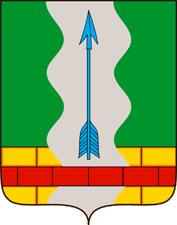
- Flag Coat of arms
- Location of Semiluksky District in Voronezh Oblast
- Coordinates: 51°41′N 39°02′E
- Country: Russia
- Federal subject: Voronezh Oblast
- Established: 1932
- Administrative center: Semiluki

Area
  - Total: 1,582 km^{2} (611 sq mi)

Population (2010 Census)
  - Total: 67,247
  - Density: 42.51/km^{2} (110.1/sq mi)
  - Urban: 55.7%
  - Rural: 44.3%

Administrative structure
  - Administrative divisions: 1 Urban settlements (towns), 2 Urban settlements (urban-type settlements), 12 Rural settlements
  - Inhabited localities: 1 cities/towns, 2 urban-type settlements, 76 rural localities

Municipal structure
  - Municipally incorporated as: Semiluksky Municipal District
  - Municipal divisions: 3 urban settlements, 12 rural settlements
- Time zone: UTC+3 (MSK)
- OKTMO ID: 20649000
- Website: http://semiluki-rayon.ru/

Semiluksky District (Russian: Семилу́кский райо́н) is an administrative and municipal district (raion), one of the thirty-two in Voronezh Oblast, Russia. It is located in the northwest of the oblast. The area of the district is 1,582 square kilometers (611 sq mi). Its administrative center is the town of Semiluki. Population: 67,368 (2021 census); 67,247 (2010 census); 67,904 (2002 census); 75,472 (1989 Soviet census). The population of Semiluki accounts for 41.5% of the district's total population.
