= Ramonsky District =

Ramonsky District Рамонский район (Russian)
- District
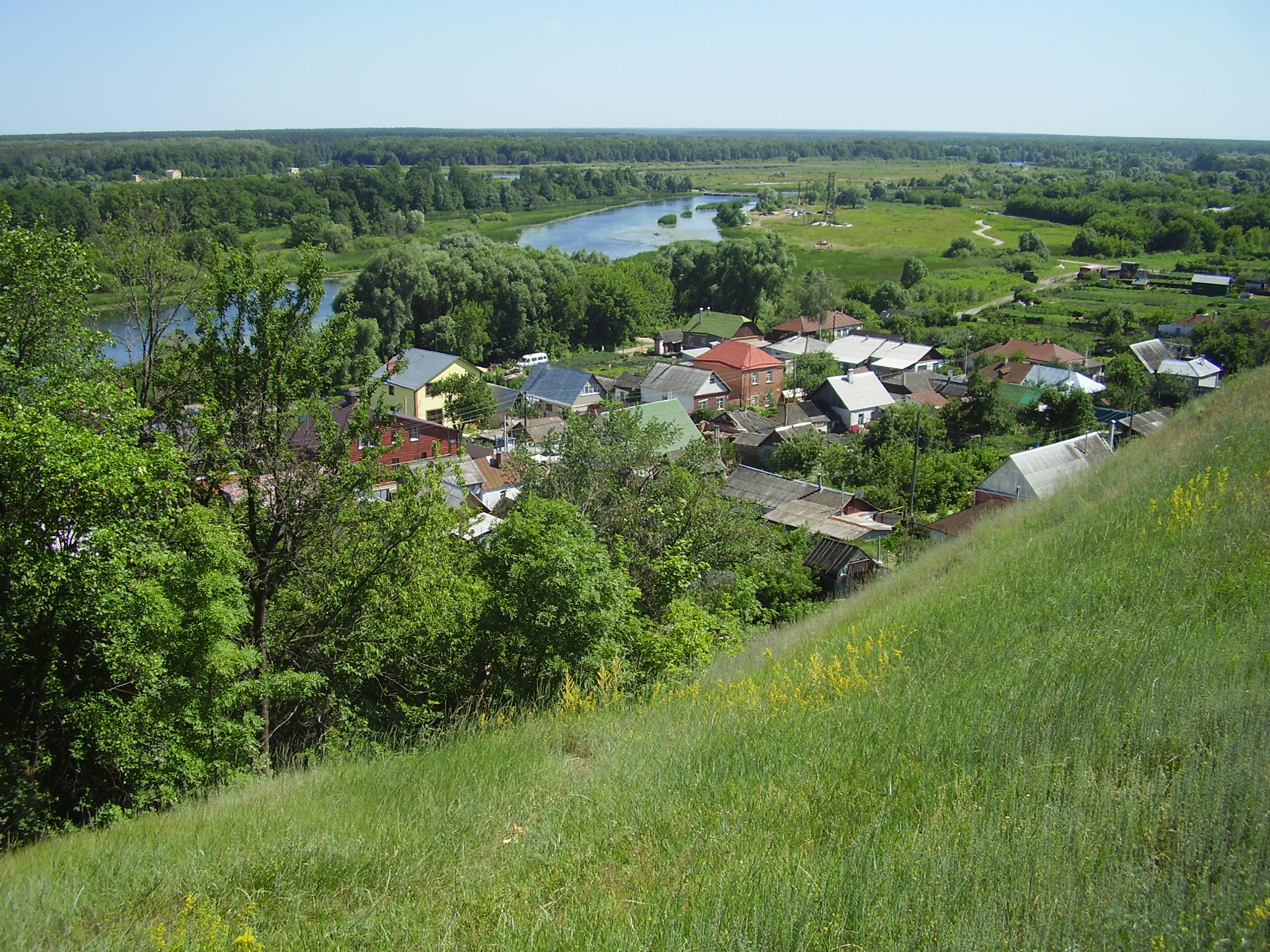
- View of Voronezh River, Ramonsky District

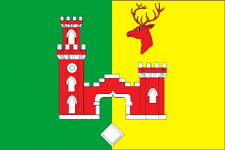
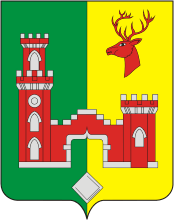
- Flag Coat of arms
- Location of Ramosky District in Voronezh Oblast
- Coordinates: 51°55′N 39°20′E
- Country: Russia
- Federal subject: Voronezh Oblast
- Established: 1965
- Administrative center: Ramon

Area
  - Total: 1,281 km^{2} (495 sq mi)

Population (2010 Census)
  - Total: 32,027
  - Density: 25.00/km^{2} (64.75/sq mi)
  - Urban: 26.1%
  - Rural: 73.9%

Administrative structure
  - Administrative divisions: 1 Urban settlements, 15 Rural settlements
  - Inhabited localities: 1 urban-type settlements, 68 rural localities

Municipal structure
  - Municipally incorporated as: Ramonsky Municipal District
  - Municipal divisions: 1 urban settlements, 15 rural settlements
- Time zone: UTC+3 (MSK)
- OKTMO ID: 20643000
- Website: http://ramon.ru/

Ramonsky District (Russian: Рамо́нский райо́н) is an administrative and municipal district (raion), one of the thirty-two in Voronezh Oblast, Russia. It is located in the northwest of the oblast. The area of the district is 1,281 square kilometers (495 sq mi). Its administrative center is the urban locality (a work settlement) of Ramon. Population: 38,471 (2021 census); 32,027 (2010 census); 33,230 (2002 census); 43,711 (1989 Soviet census). The population of Ramon accounts for 22.0% of the district's total population.
