= Ramon, Russia =

Ramon Рамонь
- Urban-type settlement
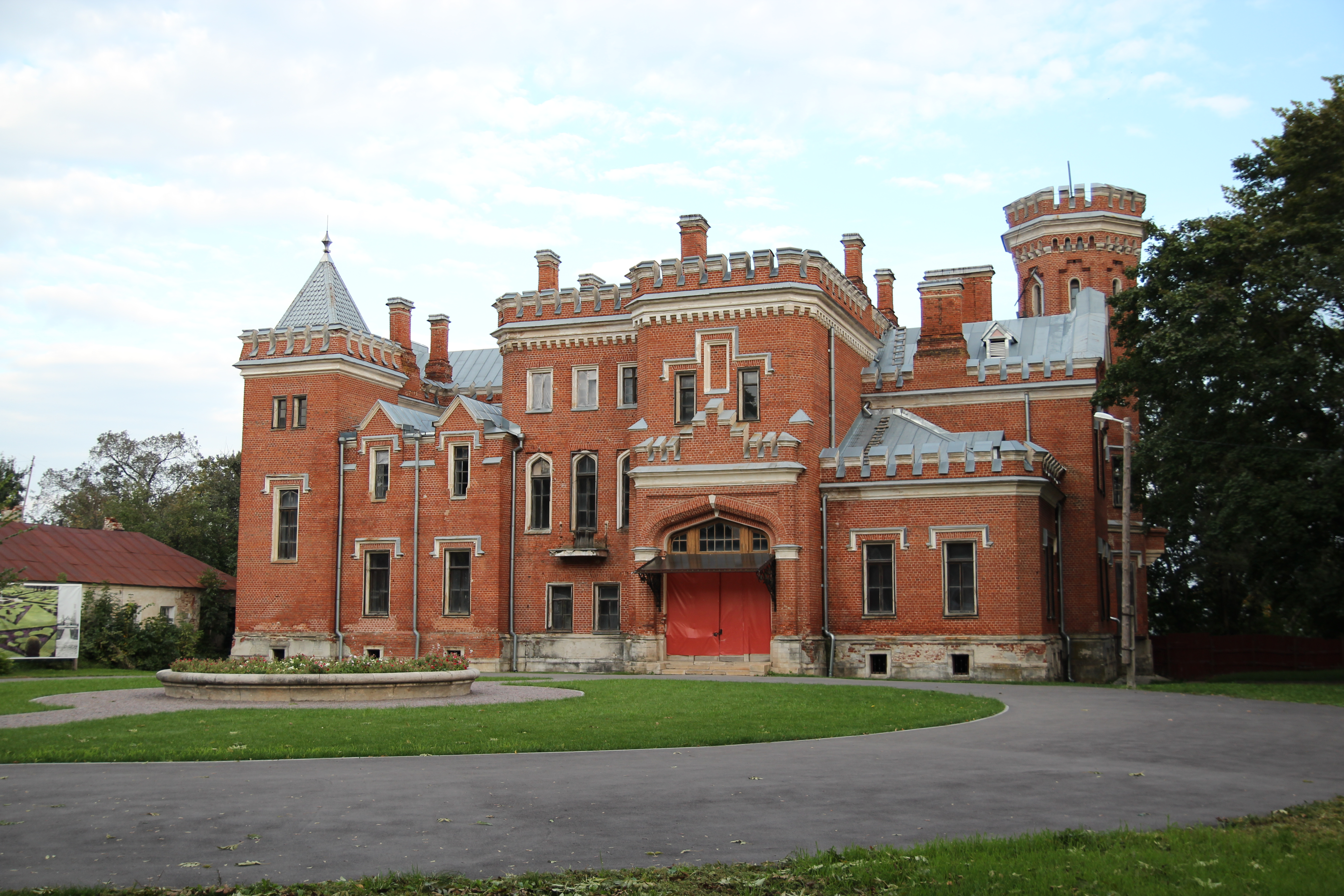

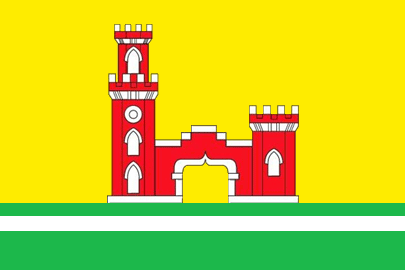
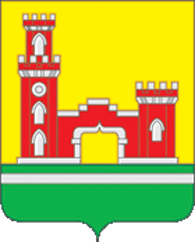
- Flag Coat of arms
- Interactive map of Ramon
- Location of Ramon Ramon (Voronezh Oblast)
- Coordinates: 51.919°N 39.335°E
- Country: Russia
- Federal subject: Voronezh Oblast
- Administrative district: Ramonsky District

Population (2010 Census)
  - Total: 8,354
  - Estimate (2021): 8,500 (+1.7%)
- Time zone: UTC+3 (MSK)
- Postal code: 396020
- OKTMO ID: 20643151051

Ramon (Russian: Рамóнь) is an urban locality (an urban-type settlement) and the administrative center of Ramonsky District of Voronezh Oblast, Russia. Population: 8,500 (2021 census); 8,354 (2010 census); 8,039 (2002 census); 8,729 (1989 Soviet census).

It was first mentioned in 1615. It was granted urban-type settlement status in 1938.

In 1879 Tsar Alexander II gave the estate of Ramon to his niece Princess Eugenia Maximilianovna of Leuchtenberg and her husband Duke Alexander Petrovich of Oldenburg as a wedding gift; she set up industrial and agricultural enterprises, expanded the estate, and in the 1880s commissioned the building of Ramon Palace, which has survived and is now a Russian cultural landmark.
