= Herbert Bachnick =

German World War II flying ace (1920–1944)

- Born: 9 February 1920; Mannheim, Germany
- Died: 7 August 1944 (aged 24); Myslowitz. Oberschlesien, Germany
- Cause of death: Killed in action
- Military career
- Allegiance: Nazi Germany
- Branch: Luftwaffe
- Service years: 1938–1944
- Rank: Leutnant (second lieutenant)
- Units: JG 52, JGr Ost
- Conflicts: World War II: Eastern Front; Defense of the Reich
- Awards: Knight's Cross of the Iron Cross

Herbert Bachnick (9 February 1920 – 7 August 1944) was a World War II flying ace in the Luftwaffe (German Air Force) credited with 80 aerial victories—that is, 80 aerial combat encounters resulting in the destruction of the enemy aircraft, all but one over the Eastern Front. He was also a recipient of the Knight's Cross of the Iron Cross. The Knight's Cross of the Iron Cross, and its variants were the highest awards in the military and paramilitary forces of Nazi Germany during World War II.

== Career ==
Bachnick was born on 9 February 1920 in Mannheim in the Republic of Baden. On 1 October 1938, Bachnik who was a kaufmännischer Angestellter (merchant) in his civil life, joined the military service in Luftwaffe. Following flight training, (Note: Flight training in the Luftwaffe progressed through the levels A1, A2 and B1, B2, referred to as A/B flight training. A training included theoretical and practical training in aerobatics, navigation, long-distance flights and dead-stick landings. The B courses included high-altitude flights, instrument flights, night landings and training to handle the aircraft in difficult situations.) he was posted to 9. Staffel (9th squadron), also known as the Karaya-Staffel, of Jagdgeschwader 52 (JG 52–52nd Fighter Wing) on 5 December 1942 serving on the Eastern Front. At the time, 9. Staffel was commanded by Hauptmann Ernst Ehrenberg and was subordinated to III. Gruppe (3rd group) of JG 52 headed by Major Hubertus von Bonin.

=== War against the Soviet Union ===
Karaya-Staffel emblem

In preparation for Operation Citadel and the Battle of Kursk, III. Gruppe moved to the airfield Bessonovka at Ugrim, located south of Kursk, on 3 July. Here, Bachnick claimed his first three aerial victories on 5 July 1943 when he shot down a Petlyakov Pe-2 bomber, an Ilyushin Il-2 ground-attack aircraft and a Lavochkin La-5 fighter. Following these events, he was awarded the Iron Cross 2nd Class (Eisernes Kreuz zweiter Klasse) and promoted to Feldwebel (sergeant). On 2 August, III. Gruppe moved to an airfield at Warwarowka, located south of Belgorod, where they stayed for three days. There, Bachnik claimed an Il-2 ground-attack aircraft and a Lavochkin-Gorbunov-Gudkov LaGG-3 fighter shot down on 4 August, and another LaGG-3 the following day.

On 14 August, the Gruppe relocated to Pereshchepyne where they stayed for four days. Here, Bachnik claimed another LaGG-3 destroyed on 17 August. Then flying from Mikhaylovka on 19 August, he again claimed a LaGG-3 fighter. On 23 August, III. Gruppe was ordered to an airfield at Makeyevka. Here, Bachnik increased his number of aerial victories claimed to 17 by end-August. On 9 September, III. Gruppe moved to an airfield at Dnipropetrovsk, present-day Dnipro, operating from this airfield until 24 September. Here, Bachnik claimed thirteen aerial victories, taking his total to 30 aerial victories. The Gruppe reached an airfield near Apostolovo on 1 November. With the exception of a brief period from 12 to 20 November when they also used an airfield at Kirovohrad, the Gruppe remained here until 7 January 1944. Here, Bachnik claimed further aerial victories, increasing his total to 46 by end of 1943. Bachnick received the Honor Goblet of the Luftwaffe (Ehrenpokal der Luftwaffe) on 13 December 1943. On 7 January 1944, Bachnik became an "ace-in-a-day" for the first time when he claimed five Il-2 ground-attack aircraft shot down near Nova Praha and Kirovohrad.

On 5 February, Bachnick was awarded the German Cross in Gold (Deutsches Kreuz in Gold) for 55 aerial victories claimed. The Gruppe moved to an airfield at Proskurov, present-day Khmelnytskyi, on 12 March where they stayed until 23 March. Here, Bachnick became an "ace-in-a-day" again on 13 March, and a third time on 19 March. On 21 March, he was credited with III. Gruppe's 3,500th aerial victory. In April, Unteroffizier Bachnick was transferred to 2. Staffel of Ergänzungs-Jagdgruppe Ost as an instructor. He was promoted to Leutnant in May. Bachnick was wounded in combat with United States Army Air Forces (USAAF) bombers and fighters on 7 July force landing his Messerschmitt Bf 109 G-6. He was awarded the Knight's Cross of the Iron Cross (Ritterkreuz des Eisernen Kreuzes) on 27 July for 78 aerial victories.

Bachnick returned to 9. Staffel of JG 52 following three months as an instructor. At the time, III. Gruppe was based at Kraków in Poland and defending against the Soviet Operation Bagration which defeated Army Group Center under command of Generalfeldmarschall Ernst Busch, retaking all of Byelorussian Soviet Socialist Republic and securing a foothold in Eastern Poland. On 7 August 1944, he engaged a USAAF formation and shot down a North American P-51 Mustang. However, his Bf 109 G-6 (Werknummer 166065—factory number) "Yellow 4" was damaged in the encounter. Bachnick attempted a forced landing near Myslowitz but crashed into a railroad embarkment, killing him.

== Summary of career ==
=== Aerial victory claims ===
According to US historian David T. Zabecki, Bachnik was credited with 80 aerial victories. Spick also lists him with 80 aerial victories, including one four-engined bomber, claimed in 373 combat missions and a mission-to-claim ratio of 4.66. Obermaier lists Bachnick with 80 aerial victories, 79 of which on the Eastern Front, claimed in 373 combat mission. Mathews and Foreman, authors of Luftwaffe Aces — Biographies and Victory Claims, researched the German Federal Archives and found records for 78 aerial victory claims, plus one further unconfirmed claim, all of which claimed on the Eastern Front.

Victory claims were logged to a map-reference (PQ = Planquadrat), for example "PQ 35 Ost 62773". The Luftwaffe grid map (Jägermeldenetz) covered all of Europe, western Russia and North Africa and was composed of rectangles measuring 15 minutes of latitude by 30 minutes of longitude, an area of about 360 square miles (930 km^{2}). These sectors were then subdivided into 36 smaller units to give a location area 3 km × 4 km (1.9 mi × 2.5 mi) in size.

Chronicle of aerial victories
This and the ♠ (Ace of spades) indicates those aerial victories which made Bachnik an "ace-in-a-day", a term which designates a fighter pilot who has shot down five or more airplanes in a single day. This and the – (dash) indicates unconfirmed aerial victory claims for which Bachnik did not receive credit. This and the ? (exclamation mark) indicates information discrepancies listed by Prien, Stemmer, Rodeike, Balke, Bock, Mathews, and Foreman.
Claim	Date	Time	Type	Location	Claim	Date	Time	Type	Location
– 9. Staffel of Jagdgeschwader 52 – Eastern Front — 4 February – 31 December 1943
1	5 July 1943	12:51	Pe-2	PQ 35 Ost 62773 vicinity of 20 km (12 mi) south-southwest of Oboyan	24	18 September 1943	15:29	Il-2 m.H. (Note: The "m.H." refers to an Ilyushin Il-2 with rear gunner (mit Heckschütze).)	PQ 34 Ost 68572; 15 km (9.3 mi) east of Pavlohrad
2	5 July 1943	16:42	Il-2 m.H.	PQ 35 Ost 61631; 15 km (9.3 mi) north of Vovchansk	25	19 September 1943	10:15	LaGG-3	PQ 34 Ost 59634; 10 km (6.2 mi) south of Pavlohrad
3	5 July 1943	18:58	La-5	PQ 35 Ost 61661, 5 km (3.1 mi) northwest of Vovchansk; 10 km (6.2 mi) north of Vovchansk	26	19 September 1943	15:28	LaGG-3	PQ 34 Ost 59612; 30 km (19 mi) southwest of Pavlohrad
4	4 August 1943	09:46	Il-2 m.H.	PQ 35 Ost 61161; 10 km (6.2 mi) southwest of Prokhorovka	27	20 September 1943	13:35	Il-2 m.H.	PQ 34 Ost 59471; 20 km (12 mi) west of Pavlohrad
5	4 August 1943	13:49	LaGG-3	PQ 35 Ost 61354; 15 km (9.3 mi) west of Tomarovka	28	20 September 1943	15:40	P-39	PQ 34 Ost 58824 vicinity of Bolschoj Tomak
6	5 August 1943	08:35	LaGG-3	PQ 35 Ost 61194; 10 km (6.2 mi) east of Krasny Liman	29	23 September 1943	14:10	Il-2 m.H.	PQ 34 Ost 58194; 20 km (12 mi) east of Zaporizhzhia
7	17 August 1943	05:20	LaGG-3	PQ 35 Ost 70733; 15 km (9.3 mi) east of Izium	30	23 September 1943	14:15	Il-2 m.H.	PQ 34 Ost 58192; 15 km (9.3 mi) east-southeast of Zaporizhzhia
8	19 August 1943	13:38	LaGG-3	PQ 34 Ost 88283, southwest of Kuibyschewo; 1 km (0.62 mi) south of Jalisawehino	31	27 November 1943	09:07	LaGG-3	PQ 34 Ost 49791; 55 km (34 mi) north of Nikopol
9	20 August 1943	06:13	Il-2	PQ 34 Ost 88252, Marinowka; 25 km (16 mi) east-northeast of Kuteinikovo	32	27 November 1943	14:23	Il-2 m.H.	PQ 34 Ost 48761, Pawlowka; 40 km (25 mi) west-southwest of Bilozirka
10	20 August 1943	10:18	Il-2	PQ 34 Ost 88263; 10 km (6.2 mi) east of Marinowka	33	27 November 1943	14:26	LaGG-3	PQ 34 Ost 48732; 35 km (22 mi) south of Nikopol
11	21 August 1943	07:18	Il-2	PQ 34 Ost 88282, west of Kuibyschewo; 5 km (3.1 mi) southeast of Jalisawehino	34	27 November 1943	14:36	Il-2 m.H.	PQ 34 Ost 48723; 40 km (25 mi) south-southwest of Nikopol
12	21 August 1943	07:24	Il-2	PQ 34 Ost 88291, west of Kuibyschewo; 15 km (9.3 mi) east of Jalisawehino	35	28 November 1943	12:05	LaGG-3	PQ 34 Ost 49841; 40 km (25 mi) south-southwest of Werchnedjeprowak
13	21 August 1943	11:50	Il-2	PQ 34 Ost 88432; 3 km (1.9 mi) southeast of Marienkeim	36	28 November 1943	13:45	Il-2 m.H.	PQ 34 Ost 48481; 25 km (16 mi) east of Nikopol
14	22 August 1943	16:21	Il-2	PQ 34 Ost 88284; 10 km (6.2 mi) southwest of Jalisawehino	37	28 November 1943	13:49	Il-2 m.H.	PQ 34 Ost 48671; 20 km (12 mi) southeast of Nikopol
15	22 August 1943	16:25	Il-2	PQ 34 Ost 88431 vicinity of Marienkeim	38	28 November 1943	13:53	Il-2 m.H.	PQ 34 Ost 48622; 25 km (16 mi) east-southeast of Nikopol
16	24 August 1943	17:55	LaGG-3	PQ 34 Ost 88332; 15 km (9.3 mi) southeast of Kuteinikovo	39	7 December 1943	14:10	LaGG-3	north of Golovkovka
17	24 August 1943	17:59	Il-2 m.H.	PQ 34 Ost 88414; 20 km (12 mi) southwest of Jalisawehino	40	13 December 1943	12:28	Il-2 m.H.	northwest of Varvarovka
18	11 September 1943	11:04	Il-2 m.H.	PQ 34 Ost 60691; 10 km (6.2 mi) southwest of Grishino	41	17 December 1943	14:16	P-39	PQ 34 Ost 29651; 20 km (12 mi) south of Nova Praha
19	14 September 1943	10:25? (Note: According to Mathews and Foreman claimed at 10:26.)	Il-2 m.H.	PQ 34 Ost 69652; 20 km (12 mi) west-northwest of Grishino	42	17 December 1943	14:19	P-39	PQ 34 Ost 29691; 30 km (19 mi) south-southeast of Nova Praha
20	14 September 1943	17:05	Yak-9? (Note: According to Mathews and Foreman claimed as a Douglas A-20 Havoc.)	PQ 34 Ost 69494 vicinity of Pavlohrad	43	19 December 1943	12:09	LaGG-3	PQ 34 Ost 48691; 10 km (6.2 mi) north of Beloserka
21	15 September 1943	11:58	La-5	PQ 34 Ost 68624; 35 km (22 mi) east-southeast of Polohy	44	19 December 1943	12:16	Il-2	PQ 34 Ost 48663; 20 km (12 mi) north of Beloserka
22	18 September 1943	15:20	LaGG-3	PQ 34 Ost 68814; 15 km (9.3 mi) east of Pavlohrad	45	20 December 1943	08:56	Il-2	south of Bolshaya Belozerka
23	18 September 1943	15:24	Il-2 m.H.	PQ 34 Ost 59682; 25 km (16 mi) south-southwest of Pavlohrad	46	25 December 1943	11:12	Il-2 m.H.	north of Kamenka
– 9. Staffel of Jagdgeschwader 52 – Eastern Front — 1 January – 7 August 1944
47♠	7 January 1944	11:22	Il-2 m.H.	PQ 34 Ost 29823; 40 km (25 mi) south of Nova Praha	64♠	13 March 1944	16:19	Il-2 m.H.? (Note: According to both Barbas, and Mathews and Foreman claimed as a Lavochkin-Gorbunov-Gudkov aircraft.)	PQ 25 Ost 60663; 10 km (6.2 mi) south of Balakliia
48♠	7 January 1944	11:25	Il-2 m.H.	PQ 34 Ost 29822; 40 km (25 mi) south of Nova Praha	65♠	13 March 1944	16:26	Il-2 m.H.	PQ 25 Ost 60063; 10 km (6.2 mi) south of Balakliia
49♠	7 January 1944	11:28	Il-2 m.H.	PQ 34 Ost 29684; 25 km (16 mi) south of Nova Praha	66♠	13 March 1944	16:29	LaGG	PQ 25 Ost 60481; 15 km (9.3 mi) northeast of Andreyevka
50♠	7 January 1944	11:45	Il-2 m.H.	PQ 34 Ost 19623; PQ 19632; 25 km (16 mi) west-southwest of Kirovohrad	67	14 March 1944	06:14	LaGG	PQ 25 Ost 70543; 15 km (9.3 mi) southeast of Balakliia
51♠	7 January 1944	11:49	Il-2 m.H.	PQ 34 Ost 29373; 15 km (9.3 mi) west of Kirovohrad	68	14 March 1944	16:29? (Note: According to both Barbas, and Mathews and Foreman claimed at 15:40.)	Il-2	PQ 25 Ost 70512; 10 km (6.2 mi) east of Balakliia
52	8 January 1944	14:05	P-39	PQ 34 Ost 29392; 10 km (6.2 mi) east of Kirovohrad	69	15 March 1944	06:48? (Note: According to both Barbas, and Mathews and Foreman claimed at 06:58.)	LaGG	PQ 25 Ost 70511; 10 km (6.2 mi) east of Balakliia
53	9 January 1944	14:05	Il-2 m.H.	PQ 34 Ost 29511 vicinity of Kirovohrad	70	17 March 1944	10:20	Il-2	PQ 25 Ost 60621; 15 km (9.3 mi) east of Andreyevka
54	23 January 1944	13:27	LaGG	PQ 34 Ost 19292; 25 km (16 mi) south-southwest of Alekandrovka	71♠	19 March 1944	07:06	Il-2	PQ 25 Ost 70523, east of Parchamowszy; 20 km (12 mi) east of Balakliia
55	30 January 1944	14:27	LaGG	PQ 34 Ost 19253; 25 km (16 mi) southeast of Signajewka	72♠	19 March 1944	07:08	Il-2	PQ 25 Ost 70611; 35 km (22 mi) north-northeast of Izium
56	26 February 1944	14:36	P-39	PQ 34 Ost 29562; 25 km (16 mi) southeast of Kirovohrad	73♠	19 March 1944	07:11	LaGG	PQ 25 Ost 70642; 30 km (19 mi) northeast of Izium
57	7 March 1944	10:20	Pe-2	PQ 25 Ost 70321 vicinity of Shevchenkovo	74♠	19 March 1944	07:35	LaGG	PQ 25 Ost 70372 vicinity of Shevchenkovo
58	12 March 1944	11:58	LaGG? (Note: According to both Barbas, and Mathews and Foreman claimed as an Ilyushin Il-2.)	PQ 25 Ost 70512; 10 km (6.2 mi) east of Balakliia	75♠	19 March 1944	16:33	LaGG	PQ 25 Ost 60623; 15 km (9.3 mi) east of Andreyevka
59	12 March 1944	12:01	LaGG?	PQ 25 Ost 70374 vicinity of Shevchenkovo	76	21 March 1944	13:22	Il-2	PQ 25 Ost 60624; 15 km (9.3 mi) east of Andreyevka
60	12 March 1944	15:46	LaGG?	PQ 25 Ost 70562; 20 km (12 mi) northeast of Izium	77	21 March 1944	13:24	Il-2	PQ 25 Ost 60491; 10 km (6.2 mi) north of Balakliia
61	12 March 1944	16:06	LaGG	PQ 25 Ost 70612; 35 km (22 mi) north-northeast of Izium	78	21 March 1944	16:16	Pe-2	PQ 25 Ost 70521; 20 km (12 mi) east of Balakliia
62♠	13 March 1944	16:05	LaGG	PQ 25 Ost 70522; 20 km (12 mi) east of Balakliia	—	7 August 1944	—	P-51	vicinity of Mysłowice
63♠	13 March 1944	16:15? (Note: According to both Barbas, and Mathews and Foreman claimed at 16:30.)	LaGG	PQ 25 Ost 60631, south of Kalinowka; PQ 60644; 10 km (6.2 mi) south of Andreyevka					

=== Awards ===
- Front Flying Clasp of the Luftwaffe for Fighter Pilots in Gold (31 July 1943)
- Iron Cross (1939)
  - 2nd Class (6 August 1943)
  - 1st Class (7 September 1943)
- Honour Goblet of the Luftwaffe (Ehrenpokal der Luftwaffe) on 13 December 1943 as Feldwebel and pilot
- German Cross in Gold on 5 February 1944 as Feldwebel in the 9./Jagdgeschwader 52
- Knight's Cross of the Iron Cross on 27 July 1944 as Fahnenjunker-Feldwebel and pilot in the 9./Jagdgeschwader 52
