= Sofyinka =

Sofyinka Софьинка
- Selo
- Location within Voronezh Oblast Location within Russia
- Coordinates: 51°36′N 40°07′E
- Country: Russia
- Region: Voronezh Oblast
- District: Paninsky District
- Time zone: UTC+3:00

Sofyinka (Russian: Софьинка) is a rural locality (a selo) in Rostashevskoye Rural Settlement, Paninsky District, Voronezh Oblast, Russia. The population was 131 as of 2010. There are 2 streets.

== Geography ==
Sofyinka is located 4 km south of Panino (the district's administrative centre) by road. Panino is the nearest rural locality.
