= Krasnye Kholmy =

Krasnye Kholmy Красные Холмы
- Selo
- Location within Voronezh Oblast Location within Russia
- Coordinates: 51°37′N 39°55′E
- Country: Russia
- Region: Voronezh Oblast
- District: Paninsky District
- Time zone: UTC+3:00

Krasnye Kholmy (Russian: Красные Холмы) is a rural locality (a settlement) in Ivanovskoye Rural Settlement, Paninsky District, Voronezh Oblast, Russia. The population was 231 as of 2010. There are 4 streets.

== Geography ==
Krasnye Kholmy is located on the Pravaya Khava River, 19 km west of Panino (the district's administrative centre) by road. Ivanovka 1-ya is the nearest rural locality.
