= Chernavka, Paninsky District, Voronezh Oblast =

Chernavka Чернавка
- Selo
- Location within Voronezh Oblast Location within Russia
- Coordinates: 51°41′N 40°22′E
- Country: Russia
- Region: Voronezh Oblast
- District: Paninsky District
- Time zone: UTC+3:00

Chernavka (Russian: Чернавка) is a rural locality (a selo) and the administrative center of Chernavskoye Rural Settlement, Paninsky District, Voronezh Oblast, Russia. The population was 616 as of 2010. There are 6 streets.

== Geography ==
Chernavka is located 22 km northeast of Panino (the district's administrative centre) by road. Borshchyovo is the nearest rural locality.
