= Rostashevka =

Rostashevka Росташевка
- Selo
- Location within Voronezh Oblast Location within Russia
- Coordinates: 51°34′N 40°03′E
- Country: Russia
- Region: Voronezh Oblast
- District: Paninsky District
- Time zone: UTC+3:00

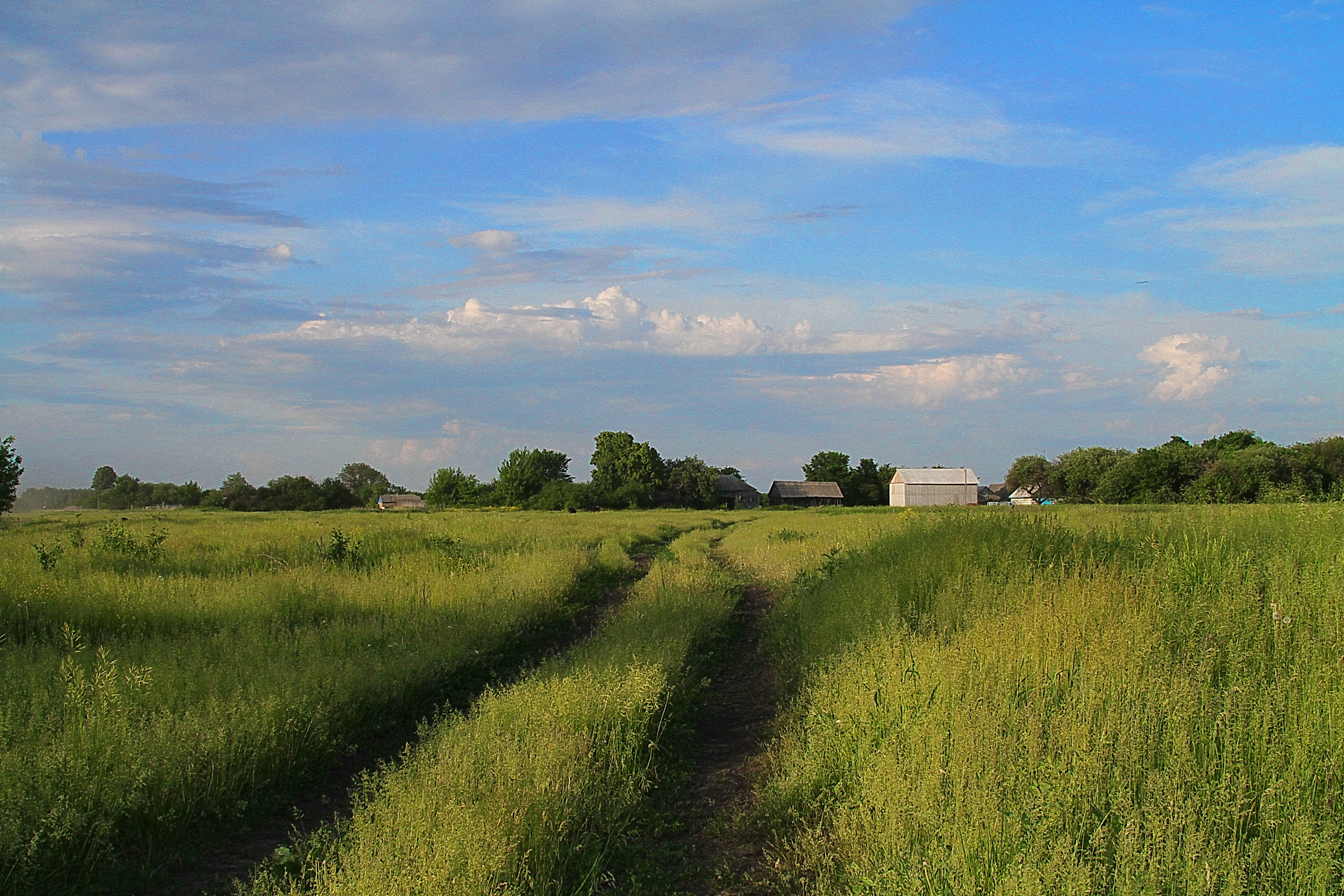
Field in Rostashevka

Rostashevka (Russian: Росташевка) is a rural locality (a selo) in Rostashevskoye Rural Settlement, Paninsky District, Voronezh Oblast, Russia. The population was 53 as of 2010. There are 2 streets.

== Geography ==
Rostashevka is located 13 km southwest of Panino (the district's administrative centre) by road. Mirovka is the nearest rural locality.
