= Otrada, Voronezh Oblast =

Otrada Отрада
- Settlement
- Location within Voronezh Oblast Location within Russia
- Coordinates: 51°40′N 40°10′E
- Country: Russia
- Region: Voronezh Oblast
- District: Paninsky District
- Time zone: UTC+3:00

Otrada (Russian: Отрада) is a rural locality (a settlement) in Panino, Paninsky District, Voronezh Oblast, Russia. The population was 116 as of 2010.

== Geography ==
Otrada is located 5 km (3.1 mi) northeast of Panino (the district's administrative centre) by road. Panino is the nearest rural locality.
