= Krasnyi Lyman (disambiguation) =

Krasnyi Lyman (Ukrainian: Красний Лиман) is most commonly used as the former name of Lyman, Ukraine. Krasnyi Lyman or its equivalent Russian-language name Krasny Liman may also refer to:

- Krasnyi Lyman, Pokrovsk Raion, Donetsk Oblast, Ukraine
- Krasnyi Lyman, Luhansk Oblast, Ukraine
- Krasny Liman, Russia
- Krasny Liman 2-y, Russia
- Krasnyi Lyman Raion, the former name of Lyman Raion, Donetsk Oblast until 2016
- Krasnolymanska coal mine

== See also ==
- Lyman (disambiguation)
