= Edmund Roßmann =

German World War II fighter pilot (1918–2005)

- Roßmann as a Feldwebel
- Born: 11 January 1918; Caaschwitz, Principality of Reuss-Gera, German Empire
- Died: 4 April 2005 (aged 87); Krefeld, Germany
- Military career
- Allegiance: Nazi Germany
- Branch: Luftwaffe
- Rank: Leutnant (second lieutenant)
- Nickname: "Paule"
- Units: JG 52, EJGr Ost
- Conflicts: World War II: Battle of France; Battle of Britain
- Awards: Knight's Cross of the Iron Cross

Edmund "Paule" Roßmann (11 January 1918 – 4 April 2005) was a Nazi Germany Luftwaffe fighter ace during World War II. He was credited with 93 aerial victories achieved in 640 combat missions, among the numerous ground attack missions. A flying ace or fighter ace is a military aviator credited with shooting down five or more enemy aircraft during aerial combat. He is also noted as being an early mentor of Erich Hartmann, history's leading fighter ace.

== Early life and career ==
Roßmann was born on 11 January 1918 in Caaschwitz in the Principality of Reuss-Gera within the German Empire. Following completion of his flight and fighter pilot training, (Note: Flight training in the Luftwaffe progressed through the levels A1, A2 and B1, B2, referred to as A/B flight training. A training included theoretical and practical training in aerobatics, navigation, long-distance flights and dead-stick landings. The B courses included high-altitude flights, instrument flights, night landings and training to handle the aircraft in difficult situations.) Roßmann was posted to 7. Staffel (7th squadron) of Jagdgeschwader 52 (JG 52—52nd Fighter Wing) on 1 March 1940 holding the rank of Unteroffizier (non-commissioned officer). At the time, 7. Staffel was commanded by Oberleutnant Herbert Ferner. The Staffel was subordinated to III. Gruppe (3rd group) of JG 52 headed by Major Wolf-Heinrich von Houwald. The Gruppe had been formed on 1 March 1940 at Strausberg and was equipped with the Messerschmitt Bf 109 E-1 and E-3. On 6 April, the Gruppe was moved to Mannheim-Sandhofen Airfield where it was placed under the control of the Stab (headquarter unit) of Jagdgeschwader 53 (JG 53–53rd Fighter Wing).

== World War II ==
World War II in Europe had begun on Friday, 1 September 1939 when German forces invaded Poland. On 1 July 1940, III. Gruppe transferred from Jever Airfield to Werneuchen. According to Mathews and Foreman, Roßmann filed claim for an unconfirmed aerial victory over an unknown type of aircraft that day. This claim is not listed by Barbas nor by Prien, Stemmer, Rodeike and Bock.

On 21 July during the Kanalkampf phase of the Battle of Britain, Roßmann claimed a Fairey Swordfish torpedo bomber shot down over the English Channel. Three days later, Roßmann claimed a Supermarine Spitfire shot down north of Margate. That day, III. Gruppe had engaged in combat with Royal Air Force (RAF) Spitfires from No. 610 Squadron on a fighter escort mission for 15 Dornier Do 17 bombers attacking shipping in the Thames Estuary. Roßmann's claim was not confirmed. On 29 July, Roßmann had a mid-air collision with a Spitfire fighter in the combat area near Dover. The following day, III. Gruppe, which had sustained heavy casualties during the Battle of Britain, was withdrawn from the English Channel and ordered to relocate to Leeuwarden Airfield. The Gruppe was then ordered to Zerbst on 1 August before moving to Merseburg on 25 August, to Neuruppin on 7 September and to Schönwalde on 18 September. At Schönwalde, III. Gruppe continued training, in particular aerial gunnery was practiced. On 7 October, the Gruppe was placed under command of Major Gotthard Handrick.

The rise of General Ion Antonescu in Romania in 1940 led to a reorganization of his country's armed forces. In this, he was supported by a military mission from Germany, the Luftwaffenmission Rumänien (Luftwaffe Mission Romania) under the command of Generalleutnant (equivalent to major general) Wilhelm Speidel. Luftwaffenmission Rumänien also defended Germany's southeastern borders, with its primary objective defending the oil fields and refineries at Ploiești. On 15 October, the Stab and 9. Staffel of III. Gruppe of JG 52 were sent to Bucharest Pipera Airfield, followed by 7. And 8. Staffel in late November. There, the III. Gruppe of JG 52 temporarily became the I. Gruppe of Jagdgeschwader 28 (JG 28—28th Fighter Wing). On 4 January 1941, the Gruppe again became the III. Gruppe of JG 52. On 25 May, III. Gruppe was sent to Greece where it was subordinated to Jagdgeschwader 77 (JG 77—77th Fighter Wing) and fought in the Battle of Crete.

=== War against the Soviet Union ===
Following its brief deployment in the Balkan Campaign, III. Gruppe was back in Bucharest by mid-June. There, the unit was again subordinated to the Luftwaffenmission Rumänien and reequipped with the new, more powerful Bf 109 F-4 model. On 21 June, the Gruppe was ordered to Mizil in preparation of Operation Barbarossa, the German invasion of the Soviet Union. Its primary objective was to provide fighter protection for the oil fields and refineries at Ploiești. Prior to the invasion, Major Gotthard Handrick was replaced by Major Albert Blumensaat as commander of III. Gruppe. Blumensaat was then replaced by Hauptmann Hubertus von Bonin on 1 October. At the time, von Bonin was still in convalescence so that Hauptmann Franz Höring, the commander of 9. Staffel, was also made the acting Gruppenkommandeur (group commander). The invasion of the Soviet Union began on 22 June. The next day, the Gruppe moved to Mamaia, the northern district of Constanța on the Black Sea coast. On 25 June, Roßmann claimed his first confirmed aerial victory when he shot down a Soviet Ilyushin DB-3 bomber.

Roßmann received the Honor Goblet of the Luftwaffe (Ehrenpokal der Luftwaffe) on 17 November. By the end of 1941 he had accumulated 32 aerial victories. On 19 March 1942, Roßmann and fellow JG 52 pilot Leutnant Adolf Dickfeld were awarded the Knight's Cross of the Iron Cross (Ritterkreuz des Eisernen Kreuzes). From March to June 1942, he was posted to Ergänzungs-Jagdgruppe Ost (Supplementary Fighter Group, East) as fighter pilot instructor and returned to his Staffel afterwards. Nevertheless, he almost doubled his score by the end of 1942 and claimed his 80th victory on 29 November 1942. At the time, he was an early mentor of Erich Hartmann, history's leading fighter ace. When in March 1943, Oberleutnant Walter Krupinski was appointed Staffelkapitän (squadron leader) of 7. Staffel, Roßmann was assigned as his wingman and assisted in familiarizing him with the combat conditions over the Kerch Peninsula.

On 5 July 1943 on the first day of Operation Citadel, Roßmann claimed three aerial victories. Four days later on 9 July, Roßmann attempted to rescue Feldwebel Ernst Lohberg who had crash landed behind enemy lines, approximately 20 kilometers (12 miles) west of Oboyan. Roßmann successfully landed his Bf 109 G-6 (Werknummer 20154—factory number) next to Lohberg's aircraft. At this moment, the Soviet infantry arrived, while Lohberg was shot, Roßmann was taken prisoner of war.

== Later life ==
Roßmann died on 4 April 2005 at the age of 87 in Krefeld, Germany.

== Summary of career ==
=== Aerial victory claims ===
According to US historian David T. Zabecki, Roßmann was credited with 93 aerial victories. Spick also lists Roßmann with 93 aerial victories claimed in approximately 640 combat missions. This figure includes 87 aerial victories on the Eastern Front, and further six victories over the Western Allies. Mathews and Foreman, authors of Luftwaffe Aces — Biographies and Victory Claims, researched the German Federal Archives and found records for 93 aerial victory claims, plus six further unconfirmed claims. All of his confirmed aerialvitories were claimed on the Eastern Front.

Victory claims were logged to a map-reference (PQ = Planquadrat), for example "PQ 44457". The Luftwaffe grid map (Jägermeldenetz) covered all of Europe, western Russia and North Africa and was composed of rectangles measuring 15 minutes of latitude by 30 minutes of longitude, an area of about 360 square miles (930 km^{2}). These sectors were then subdivided into 36 smaller units to give a location area 3 km × 4 km (1.9 mi × 2.5 mi) in size.

Chronicle of aerial victories
This and the – (dash) indicates unconfirmed aerial victory claims for which Roßmann did not receive credit. This and the ? (question mark) indicates information discrepancies listed by Prien, Stemmer, Rodeike, Bock, Mathews and Foreman.
Claim	Date	Time	Type	Location	Claim	Date	Time	Type	Location
– 7. Staffel of Jagdgeschwader 52 – Action at the Channel and over England — 26 June – 1 August 1940
— ? (Note: This claim is not listed by Prien, Stemmer, Rodeike and Bock.)	1 July 1940	—	unknown		—	24 July 1940	—	Spitfire	northeast of Margate
—	21 July 1940	—	Swordfish	English Channel	—	25 July 1940	—	Bréguet 690	40 km (25 mi) east of Margate
— ?	21 July 1940	—	unknown	Strait of Dover	— ?	29 July 1940	—	Spitfire	Dover
– 7. Staffel of Jagdgeschwader 52 – Operation Barbarossa — 22 June – 5 December 1941
1	25 June 1941	17:40	DB-3	southeast of Constanța	16	17 September 1941	10:30	I-16	Brovary
2	8 July 1941	15:56? (Note: According to Mathews and Foreman claimed at 15:55.)	DB-3	northeast of Mamaia	17	2 October 1941	08:25	I-26 (Yak-1)	east of Poltava
3	8 July 1941	16:00	DB-3	northeast of Mamaia	18	3 October 1941	17:10	R-10 (Seversky)	north of Karjap
4	8 July 1941	16:03	DB-3	northeast of Mamaia	19	4 October 1941	12:10	ground-attack aircraft (Seversky)	south of Covaci
5	4 August 1941	05:55	I-16		20	14 October 1941	16:30	I-26 (Yak-1)	
6	4 August 1941	14:35	I-18 (MiG-1)		21	14 October 1941	16:50	I-16	
7	7 August 1941	06:15	I-16		22	17 October 1941	07:21	I-26 (Yak-1)	
8	7 August 1941	06:40	DB-3		23	24 October 1941	12:45	I-15	Chaplynka
9	11 August 1941	09:29	I-18 (MiG-1)		24	24 October 1941	12:50	I-61 (MiG-3)	Chaplynka
10	26 August 1941	10:40	I-16		25	25 October 1941	11:45	I-16	
11	1 September 1941	11:16	I-17 (MiG-1)		26	31 October 1941	15:32	I-61 (MiG-3)	
12	7 September 1941	09:25	I-16	Stschastliwaja	27	9 November 1941	11:21	V-11 (Il-2)	
13	7 September 1941	09:30	I-17 (MiG-1)		28	16 November 1941	13:31	I-26 (Yak-1)	
14	7 September 1941	11:41	DB-3		29	28 November 1941	12:53	I-61 (MiG-3)	
15	13 September 1941	12:45? (Note: According to Mathews and Foreman claimed at 12:40.)	I-17 (MiG-1)	50 km (31 mi) northwest of Dnepropetrovsk; 3 km (1.9 mi) northeast of Dnepropetrovsk	30	2 December 1941	08:10	I-16	
– 7. Staffel of Jagdgeschwader 52 – Eastern Front — 6 December 1941 – 28 April 1942
31	8 December 1941	09:12	I-16		39	17 February 1942	08:02	I-61 (MiG-3)	
32	11 December 1941	10:47	V-11 (Il-2)		40	17 February 1942	10:32	I-61 (MiG-3)	
33	4 January 1942	13:03	LaGG-3		41	17 February 1942	10:36	I-16	
34	5 January 1942	12:00	DB-3		42	18 February 1942	16:09	I-61 (MiG-3)	20 km (12 mi) northeast of Belgorod
35	7 January 1942	09:30	DB-3	5 km (3.1 mi) west of Karankut	43	22 February 1942	15:36	I-61 (MiG-3)	
36	15 January 1942	10:25	DB-3	5 km (3.1 mi) west of Karankut	44	16 March 1942	10:31	I-16	
37	15 January 1942	14:50	DB-3		45	16 March 1942	11:47	Il-2	
38	17 February 1942	07:59	Su-2 (Seversky)						
– 7. Staffel of Jagdgeschwader 52 – Eastern Front — 29 April 1942 – 3 February 1943
46	13 June 1942	16:15	LaGG-3		65	6 September 1942	14:47	LaGG-3	PQ 44457 vicinity of Mozdok
47	23 June 1942	16:35	MiG-1		66	6 September 1942	16:50	I-16	PQ 4444
48	23 June 1942	16:37	Hurricane	PQ 70332 vicinity of Shevchenkovo	67	7 September 1942	12:05	I-16	PQ 44474
49	21 July 1942	15:20	I-16	PQ 98821 vicinity of Rostov	68	8 September 1942	13:50? (Note: According to Mathews and Foreman claimed at 13:49.)	LaGG-3	PQ 44472 south of Mozdok
50	23 July 1942	07:15	I-16		69	8 September 1942	13:51	LaGG-3	PQ 44443, north of Georgjewsk
51	24 July 1942	06:28	I-16		70	13 September 1942	09:35	LaGG-3	PQ 44362
52	24 July 1942	09:50	LaGG-3		71	19 September 1942	16:38	LaGG-3	PQ 54351
53	23 August 1942	05:35	I-16	PQ 44251	72	29 September 1942	10:40	I-16	PQ 44533, south of Nizhniy Kurp
54	23 August 1942	05:37	I-153? (Note: According to Mathews and Foreman claimed as a Curtiss P-40 Warhawk.)	PQ 44213	73	9 October 1942	09:07	I-16	PQ 44484
55	23 August 1942	16:35	LaGG-3	PQ 44281	74	9 October 1942	13:25	LaGG-3	PQ 44623 vicinity of Malgobek
56	24 August 1942	11:45	Il-2? (Note: According to Mathews and Foreman claimed as a Seversky Aircraft Company aircraft.)	PQ 44374	75	15 October 1942	09:30	LaGG-3	PQ 44453 south of Mozdok
57	26 August 1942	17:23	LaGG-3	PQ 44471 south of Mozdok	76	29 October 1942	10:15	LaGG-3	PQ 44551 southwest of Daiskoje
58	28 August 1942	14:16	LaGG-3	PQ 44454 south of Mozdok	77	29 October 1942	13:35	LaGG-3	PQ 34694
59	30 August 1942	09:57	I-16	PQ 54213 vicinity of Volkenskoje	78	6 November 1942	08:15	I-16	PQ 44857
60	30 August 1942	09:59	LaGG-3	PQ 54373	79	6 November 1942	11:34	LaGG-3	PQ 44764
61	30 August 1942	10:01	LaGG-3	PQ 54342 vicinity of Beketowka	80	29 November 1942	05:47	R-5	PQ 44793
62	30 August 1942	11:23	LaGG-3	PQ 54371 vicinity of Kalinowskaja	81	8 December 1942	09:54	LaGG-3	PQ 44567
63	5 September 1942	11:00? (Note: According to Mathews and Foreman claimed at 11:09.)	LaGG-3	PQ 54454 vicinity of Wosnessnokaja	82	8 December 1942	10:00	Il-2	PQ 44551 west of Elkhotovo
64	6 September 1942	07:35	I-16	PQ 44453 south of Mozdok					
– 7. Staffel of Jagdgeschwader 52 – Eastern Front — 3 February – 9 July 1943
83	28 March 1943	05:40	LaGG-3	PQ 34 Ost 86571 northwest of Sslaeanskaja	89	5 July 1943	03:55	LaGG-3	PQ 35 Ost 61442; 10 km (6.2 mi) north of Belgorod
84	30 April 1943	08:30	LaGG-3	PQ 34 Ost 85173 southwest of Krymsk	90	5 July 1943	18:09	LaGG-3	PQ 35 Ost 61652; 15 km (9.3 mi) northwest of Vovchansk
85	30 April 1943	08:32	LaGG-3	PQ 34 Ost 85174 east of Krymsk	91	5 July 1943	18:12	Il-2	PQ 35 Ost 61652; 15 km (9.3 mi) northwest of Vovchansk
86	6 May 1943	16:47	LaGG-3	PQ 34 Ost 76693 west of Slavyansk-na-Kubani	92	6 July 1943	10:30	Il-2 m.H. (Note: The "m.H." refers to an Ilyushin Il-2 with rear gunner (mit Heckschütze).)	PQ 35 Ost 61652; 15 km (9.3 mi) northwest of Vovchansk
87	31 May 1943	09:55	LaGG-3	PQ 34 Ost 75232, north of Krymskaya	93	7 July 1943	04:58	Il-2 m.H.	PQ 35 Ost 61634; 15 km (9.3 mi) north of Vovchansk
88	31 May 1943	14:11	Pe-2	PQ 34 Ost 75232, north of Krymskaya					

=== Awards ===
- Iron Cross (1939) 2nd and 1st Class
- Honor Goblet of the Luftwaffe on 17 November 1941 as Unteroffizier and pilot (Note: According to Obermaier on 6 November 1941.)
- German Cross in Gold on 22 January 1942 as Feldwebel in the III./Jagdgeschwader 52
- Knight's Cross of the Iron Cross on 19 March 1942 as Feldwebel and pilot in the 7./Jagdgeschwader 52
