= Bolshoye Martyn =

Bolshoye Martyn Большой Мартын
- Selo
- Location within Voronezh Oblast Location within Russia
- Coordinates: 51°23′N 40°01′E
- Country: Russia
- Region: Voronezh Oblast
- District: Paninsky District
- Time zone: UTC+3:00

Bolshoye Martyn (Russian: Большой Мартын) is a rural locality (a selo) in Kriushanskoye Rural Settlement, Paninsky District, Voronezh Oblast, Russia. The population was 854 as of 2010. There are 12 streets.

== Geography ==
Bolshoye Martyn is located on the Martyn River, 36 km south of Panino (the district's administrative centre) by road. Maly Martyn is the nearest rural locality.
