= Novokhrenovoye =

Novokhrenovoye Новохреновое
- Selo
- Location within Voronezh Oblast Location within Russia
- Coordinates: 51°34′N 39°55′E
- Country: Russia
- Region: Voronezh Oblast
- District: Paninsky District
- Time zone: UTC+3:00

Novokhrenovoye (Russian: Новохреновое) is a rural locality (a selo) in Oktyabrskoye Rural Settlement, Paninsky District, Voronezh Oblast, Russia. The population was 489 as of 2010. There are 9 streets.

== Geography ==
Novokhrenovoye is located on the right bank of the Tamlyk River, 18 kilometres (11 mi) southwest of Panino (the district's administrative centre) by road. Novokhrenovoye is the nearest rural locality.
