= Pervomaysky, Paninsky District, Voronezh Oblast =

Pervomaysky Первомайский
- Settlement
- Location within Voronezh Oblast Location within Russia
- Coordinates: 51°43′N 40°09′E
- Country: Russia
- Region: Voronezh Oblast
- District: Paninsky District
- Time zone: UTC+3:00

Pervomaysky (Russian: Первомайский) is a rural locality (a settlement) in Krasnenskoye Rural Settlement, Paninsky District, Voronezh Oblast, Russia. The population was 230 as of 2010. There are 5 streets.

== Geography ==
Pervomaysky is located 10 km north of Panino (the district's administrative centre) by road. Perelyoshino is the nearest rural locality.
