= Ivanovka 1-ya =

Ivanovka 1-ya Ивановка 1-я
- Selo
- Location within Voronezh Oblast Location within Russia
- Coordinates: 51°38′N 39°57′E
- Country: Russia
- Region: Voronezh Oblast
- District: Paninsky District
- Time zone: UTC+3:00

Ivanovka 1-ya (Russian: Ивановка 1-я) is a rural locality (a settlement) and the administrative center of Ivanovskoye Rural Settlement, Paninsky District, Voronezh Oblast, Russia. The population was 301 as of 2010. There are 3 streets.

== Geography ==
Ivanovka 1-ya is located on the Pravaya Khava River, 14 km west of Panino (the district's administrative centre) by road. Krasnye Kholmy is the nearest rural locality.
