= Pady, Voronezh Oblast =

Pady Пады
- Selo
- Location within Voronezh Oblast Location within Russia
- Coordinates: 51°39′N 40°27′E
- Country: Russia
- Region: Voronezh Oblast
- District: Paninsky District
- Time zone: UTC+3:00

Pady (Russian: Пады) is a rural locality (a selo) in Progressovskoye Rural Settlement, Paninsky District, Voronezh Oblast, Russia. The population was 224 as of 2010. There are 6 streets.

== Geography ==
Pady is located on the Bityug River, 29 km east of Panino (the district's administrative centre) by road. Borshchyovo is the nearest rural locality.
