= Perelyoshino =

Perelyoshino Перелёшино
- Settlement
- Location within Voronezh Oblast Location within Russia
- Coordinates: 51°44′N 40°08′E
- Country: Russia
- Region: Voronezh Oblast
- District: Paninsky District
- Time zone: UTC+3:00

Perelyoshino (Russian: Перелёшино) is a rural locality (a settlement) and the administrative center of Krasnenskoye Rural Settlement, Paninsky District, Voronezh Oblast, Russia. The population was 3,964 as of 2010. There are 8 streets.

== Geography ==
Perelyoshino is located 11 km north of Panino (the district's administrative centre) by road. Dmitriyevka is the nearest rural locality.
