= Toyda 1-ya =

Toyda 1-ya Тойда 1-я
- Settlement
- Location within Voronezh Oblast Location within Russia
- Coordinates: 51°32′N 40°08′E
- Country: Russia
- Region: Voronezh Oblast
- District: Paninsky District
- Time zone: UTC+3:00

Toyda 1-ya (Russian: Тойда 1-я) is a rural locality (a settlement) in Oktyabrskoye Rural Settlement, Paninsky District, Voronezh Oblast, Russia. The population was 596 as of 2010. There are 8 streets.

== Geography ==
Toyda 1-ya is located 17 km south of Panino (the district's administrative centre) by road. Shaninsky is the nearest rural locality.
