= Kirovskoye, Voronezh Oblast =

Kirovskoye Кировское
- Settlement
- Location within Voronezh Oblast Location within Russia
- Coordinates: 51°31′N 39°59′E
- Country: Russia
- Region: Voronezh Oblast
- District: Paninsky District
- Time zone: UTC+3:00

Kirovskoye (Russian: Кировское) is a rural locality (a settlement) in Oktyabrskoye Rural Settlement, Paninsky District, Voronezh Oblast, Russia. The population was 246 as of 2010. There are 6 streets.

== Geography ==
Kirovskoye is located 22 km southwest of Panino (the district's administrative centre) by road. Oktyabrsky is the nearest rural locality.
