= Maryevka, Paninsky District, Voronezh Oblast =

Maryevka Марьевка
- Selo
- Location within Voronezh Oblast Location within Russia
- Coordinates: 51°37′N 40°19′E
- Country: Russia
- Region: Voronezh Oblast
- District: Paninsky District
- Time zone: UTC+3:00

Maryevka (Russian: Марьевка) is a rural locality (a selo) in Progressovskoye Rural Settlement, Paninsky District, Voronezh Oblast, Russia. The population was 122 as of 2010. There are 3 streets.

== Geography ==
Maryevka is located 18 km southeast of Panino (the district's administrative centre) by road. Nikolskoye is the nearest rural locality.
