= Toyda 2-ya =

Toyda 2-ya Тойда 2-я
- Settlement
- Location within Voronezh Oblast Location within Russia
- Coordinates: 51°35′N 40°08′E
- Country: Russia
- Region: Voronezh Oblast
- District: Paninsky District
- Time zone: UTC+3:00

Toyda 2-ya (Russian: Тойда 2-я) is a rural locality (a settlement) in Oktyabrskoye Rural Settlement, Paninsky District, Voronezh Oblast, Russia. The population was 82 as of 2010. There are 2 streets.

== Geography ==
Toyda 2-ya is located 19 km south of Panino (the district's administrative centre) by road. Toyda is the nearest rural locality.
