= Toyda =

Toyda Тойда
- Settlement
- Location within Voronezh Oblast Location within Russia
- Coordinates: 51°34′N 40°10′E
- Country: Russia
- Region: Voronezh Oblast
- District: Paninsky District
- Time zone: UTC+3:00

Toyda (Russian: Тойда) is a rural locality (a settlement) in Oktyabrskoye Rural Settlement, Paninsky District, Voronezh Oblast, Russia. The population was 277 as of 2010. There are 4 streets.

== Geography ==
Toyda is located 10 km southeast of Panino (the district's administrative centre) by road. Timiryazevsky is the nearest rural locality.
