= Mirovka, Voronezh Oblast =

Mirovka Мировка
- Selo
- Location within Voronezh Oblast Location within Russia
- Coordinates: 51°35′N 40°05′E
- Country: Russia
- Region: Voronezh Oblast
- District: Paninsky District
- Time zone: UTC+3:00

Mirovka (Russian: Мировка) is a rural locality (a selo) in Rostashevskoye Rural Settlement, Paninsky District, Voronezh Oblast, Russia. The population was 67 as of 2010. There are 2 streets.

== Geography ==
Mirovka is located 13 km southwest of Panino (the district's administrative centre) by road. Rostashevka is the nearest rural locality.
