= Kriusha =

Kriusha Криуша
- Selo
- Location within Voronezh Oblast Location within Russia
- Coordinates: 51°27′N 40°02′E
- Country: Russia
- Region: Voronezh Oblast
- District: Paninsky District
- Time zone: UTC+3:00

Kriusha (Russian: Криуша) is a rural locality (a selo) and the administrative center of Kriushanskoye Rural Settlement, Paninsky District, Voronezh Oblast, Russia. The population was 725 as of 2010. There are 8 streets.

== Geography ==
Kriusha is located on the left bank of the Ikorets River, 29 km south of Panino (the district's administrative centre) by road. Agarkov is the nearest rural locality. The village is located in the central part of the municipality, on the left bank of the Ikorets River, into which a small stream flows. The northern boundary of the village is the federal highway A144.

Streets

- Belozerskogo St.
- Komsomolskaya St.
- Mira St.
- Molodezhnaya St.
- Naberezhnaya St.
- Oktyabrskaya St.
- Sadovaya St.
- Tsentralnaya St.

== History ==
Initially, the village was called Krivusha, named after the sharp bend in the river's course. It was founded in the early 19th century on the lands of Count Alexey Grigoryevich Orlov-Chesmensky. In 1845, it was purchased by the state from Countess Anna Alexeyevna Orlova-Chesmensky. In 1859, a wooden Archangel Church was built in the village (it no longer exists today). At that time, 876 people lived here in 83 households. By 1900, the village had 67 households with a population of 1,564 residents; there was one public building, a zemstvo school, nine windmills, a groat mill, two blacksmiths, and wine and tea shops. In 1926, there were 2062 people. It was part of the Bobrov and Voronezh districts (1923-1928). From 1936 to 1957, the village was included in the Limanovsky district.

== Infrastructure ==
Currently, Kriusha has a secondary school, a cultural center, a library, a paramedic and obstetrician point, and a post office.
