= Shcherbachyovka =

Shcherbachyovka Щербачёвка
- Settlement
- Location within Voronezh Oblast Location within Russia
- Coordinates: 51°45′N 40°17′E
- Country: Russia
- Region: Voronezh Oblast
- District: Paninsky District
- Time zone: UTC+3:00

Shcherbachyovka (Russian: Щербачёвка) is a rural locality (a settlement) in Chernavskoye Rural Settlement, Paninsky District, Voronezh Oblast, Russia. The population was 181 as of 2010. There are 4 streets.

== Geography ==
Shcherbachyovka is located 35 km northeast of Panino (the district's administrative centre) by road. Khitrovka is the nearest rural locality.
