= Aloye Pole =

Aloye Pole Алое Поле
- Settlement
- Location within Voronezh Oblast Location within Russia
- Coordinates: 51°36′N 40°03′E
- Country: Russia
- Region: Voronezh Oblast
- District: Paninsky District
- Time zone: UTC+3:00

Aloye Pole (Russian: Алое Поле) is a rural locality (a settlement) and the administrative center of Rostashevskoye Rural Settlement, Paninsky District, Voronezh Oblast, Russia. The population was 574 as of 2010. There are 6 streets.

== Geography ==
Aloye Pole is located 9 km southwest of Panino (the district's administrative centre) by road. Mirovka is the nearest rural locality.
