= Tarasovka, Voronezh Oblast =

Tarasovka Тарасовка
- Selo
- Location within Voronezh Oblast Location within Russia
- Coordinates: 51°29′N 39°48′E
- Country: Russia
- Region: Voronezh Oblast
- District: Paninsky District
- Time zone: UTC+3:00

Tarasovka (Russian: Тарасовка) is a rural locality (a selo) in Krasnolimanskoye Rural Settlement, Paninsky District, Voronezh Oblast, Russia. The population was 109 as of 2010.

== Geography ==
Tarasovka is located on the Tamlyk River, 43 km southwest of Panino (the district's administrative centre) by road. Barsuchye is the nearest rural locality.
