= Verkhnyaya Katukhovka =

Verkhnyaya Katukhovka Верхняя Катуховка
- Selo
- Location within Voronezh Oblast Location within Russia
- Coordinates: 51°40′N 39°56′E
- Country: Russia
- Region: Voronezh Oblast
- District: Paninsky District
- Time zone: UTC+3:00

Verkhnyaya Katukhovka (Russian: Верхняя Катуховка) is a rural locality (a settlement) in Ivanovskoye Rural Settlement, Paninsky District, Voronezh Oblast, Russia. The population was 447 as of 2010. There are 5 streets.

== Geography ==
Verkhnyaya Katukhovka is located on the Pravaya Khava River, 15 km northwest of Panino (the district's administrative centre) by road. Trudolyubovka is the nearest rural locality.
