= Krasny Liman 2-y =

Krasny Liman 2-y Красный Лиман 2-й
- Selo
- Location within Voronezh Oblast Location within Russia
- Coordinates: 51°27′N 39°51′E
- Country: Russia
- Region: Voronezh Oblast
- District: Paninsky District
- Time zone: UTC+3:00

Krasny Liman 2-y (Russian: Красный Лиман 2-й) is a rural locality (a selo) in Krasnolimanskoye Rural Settlement, Paninsky District, Voronezh Oblast, Russia. The population was 796 as of 2010. There are 5 streets.

== Geography ==
Krasny Liman 2-y is located 36 km southwest of Panino (the district's administrative centre) by road. Komsomolskoye is the nearest rural locality.
