= Sokilnyky, Kirovohrad Oblast =

Village in Kirovohrad Oblast, Ukraine

Sokilnyky Сокільники
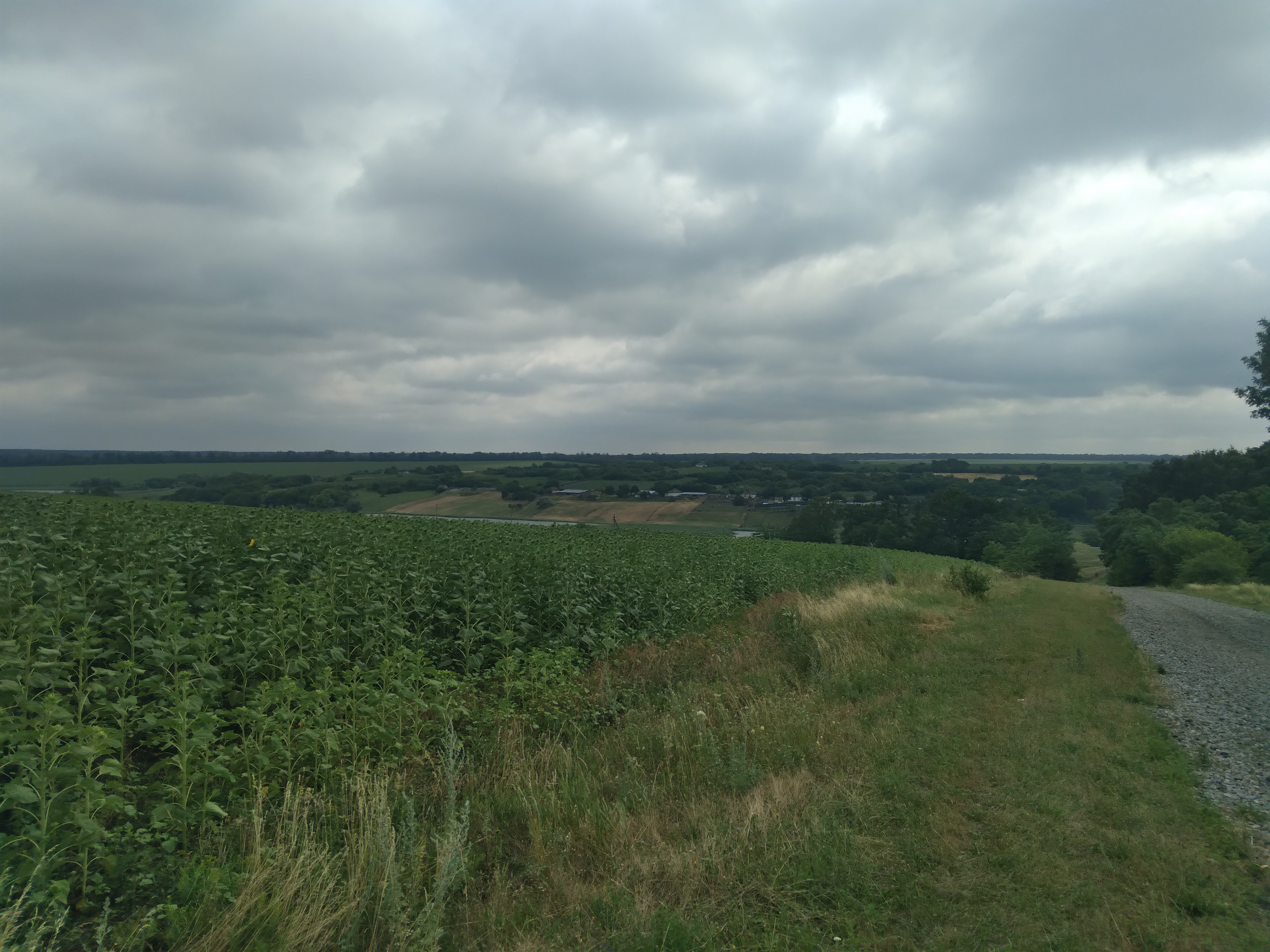

- Location within Ukraine Location within Ukraine Kirovohrad Oblast
- Coordinates: 48°42′49″N 32°40′24″E
- Country: Ukraine
- Oblast: Kirovohrad Oblast
- Raion: Kropyvnytskyi Raion
- Founded: XIX century

Area
  - Total: 0,555 km^{2} (214 sq mi)

Population (2022)
  - Total: 43
  - Density: 0.077/km^{2} (0.20/sq mi)
- Postal code: 27452

Sokilnyky (Ukrainian: Сокільники) is a village in central Ukraine, Kropyvnytskyi Raion, Kirovohrad Oblast, in Znamianka urban hromada. It has a population of 43 (2022 estimate).

== Geography ==
Sokilnyky is located south of Znamianka. The Beshka river begins near the village.

== History ==
During the Holodomor of 1932-1933, at least 5 villagers died.

Before 1970s the villsge was called Stanyshyna (Ukr. Станишина).

== Gallery ==
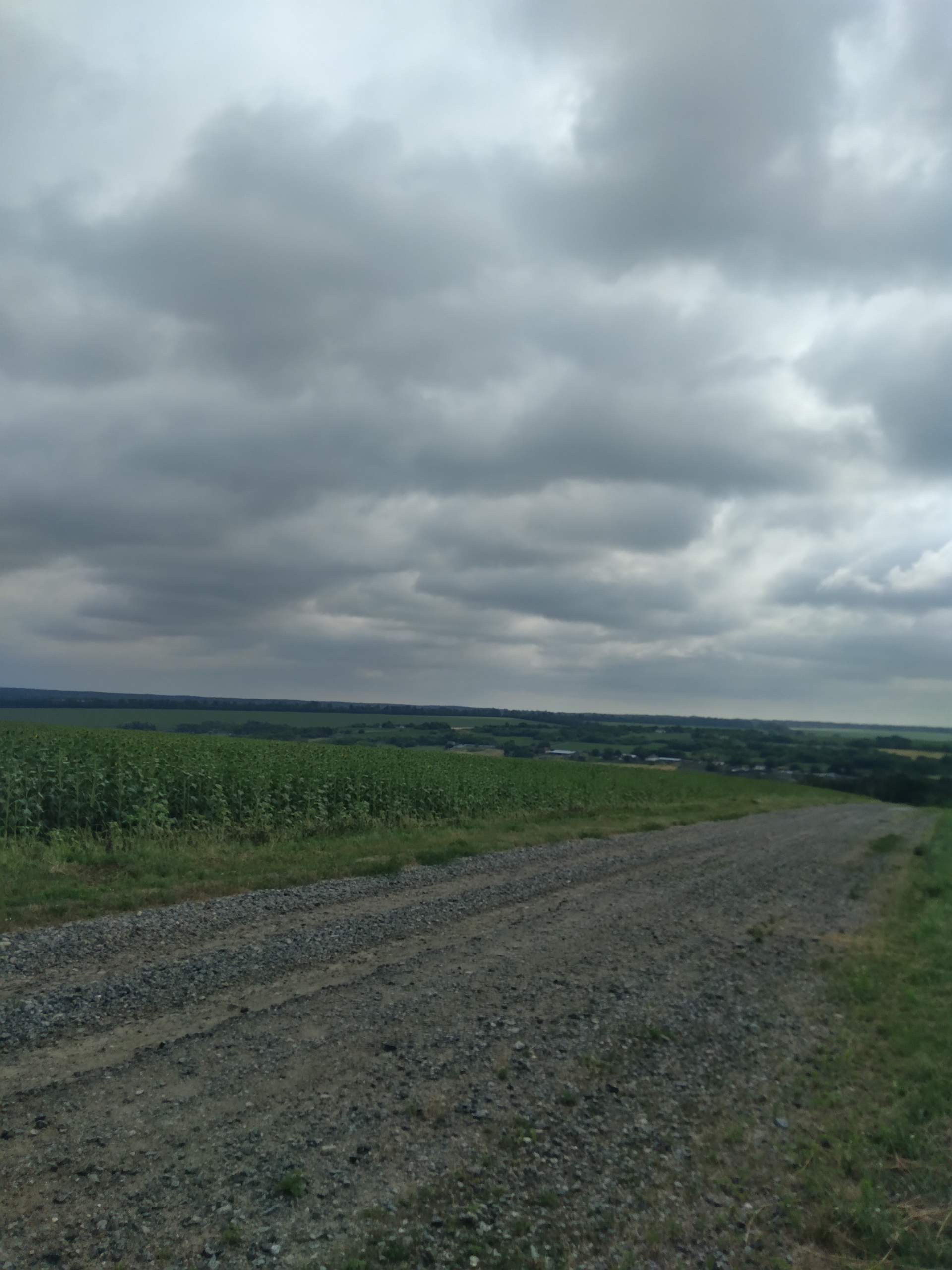

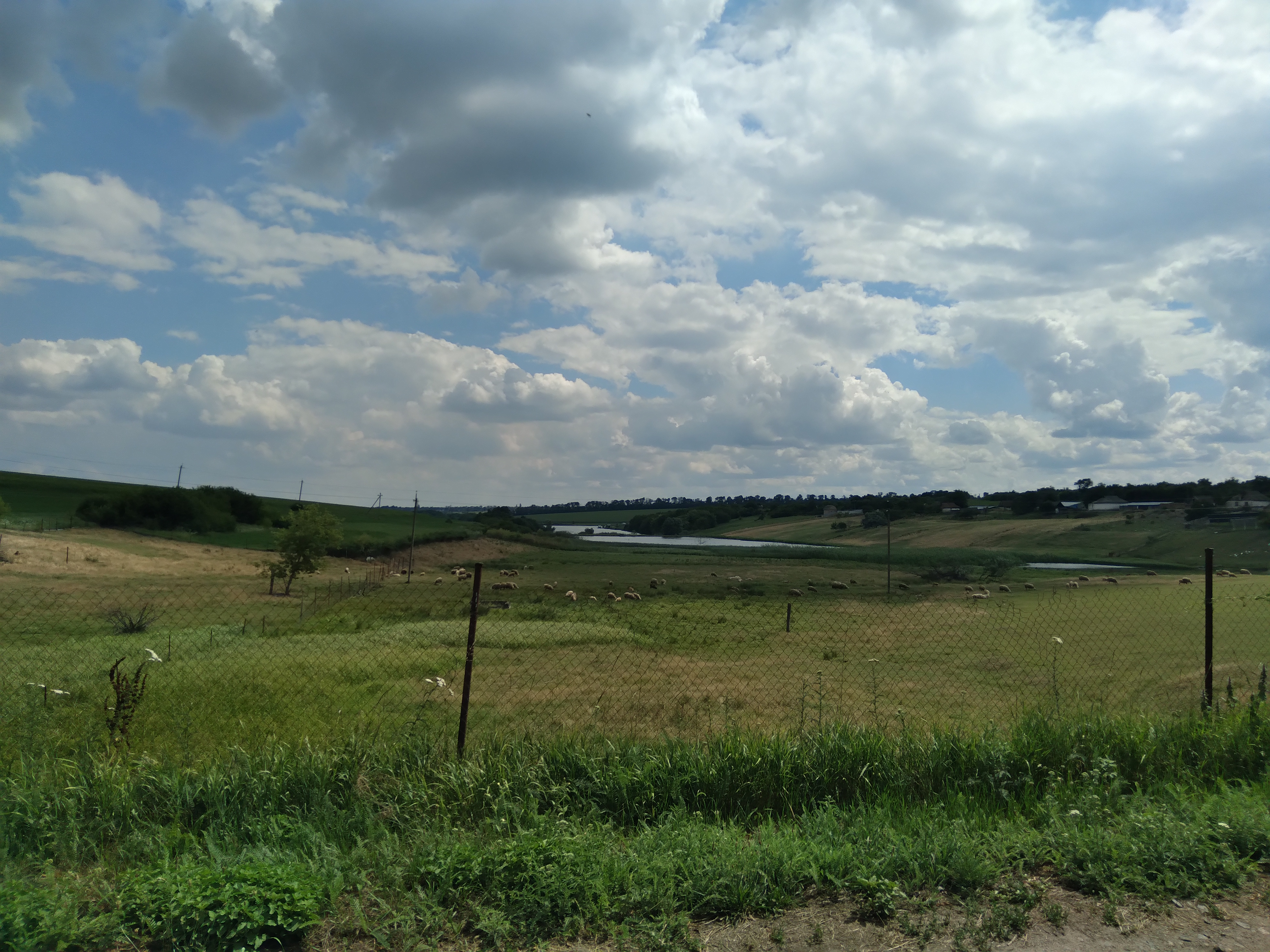

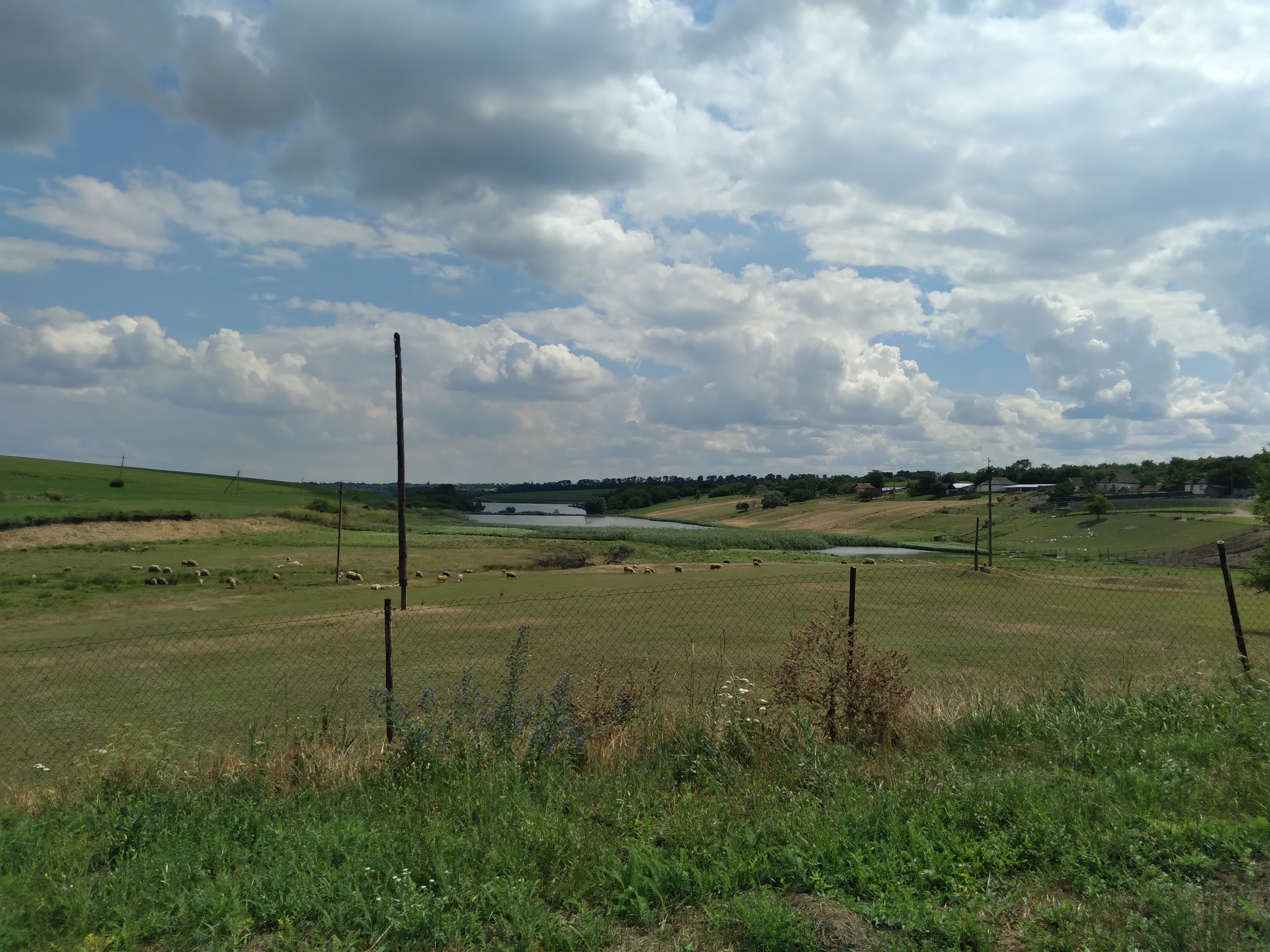

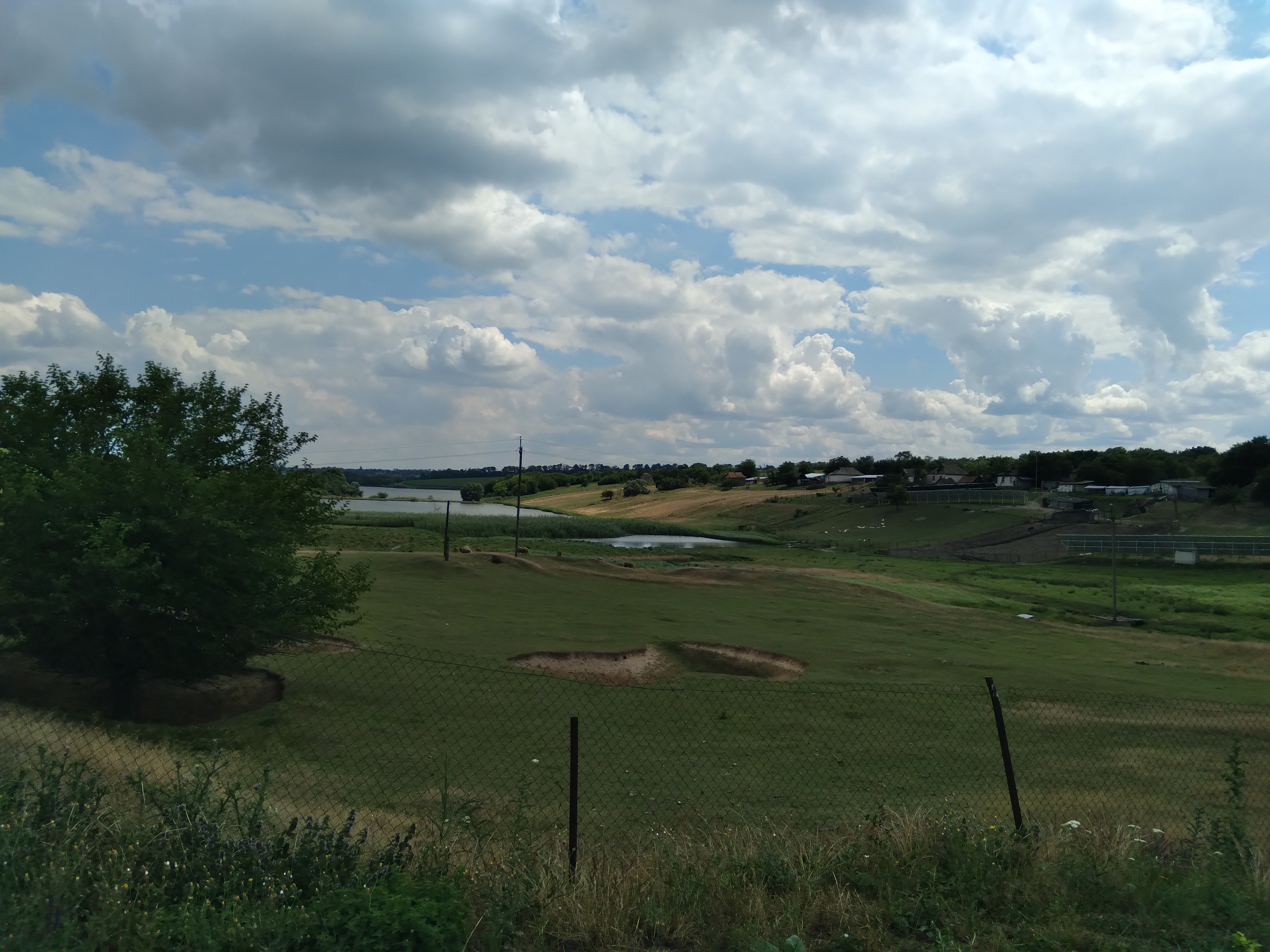

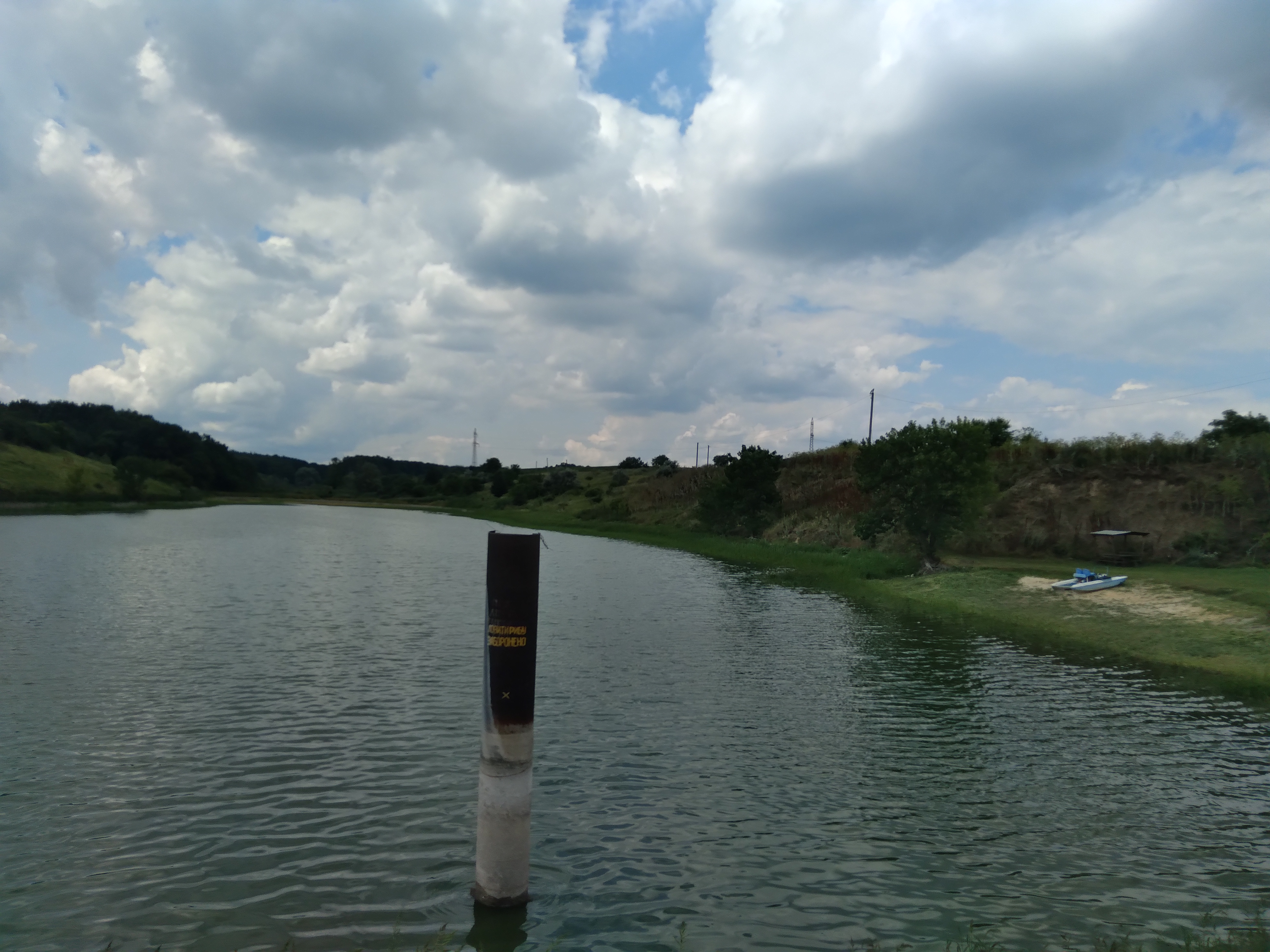

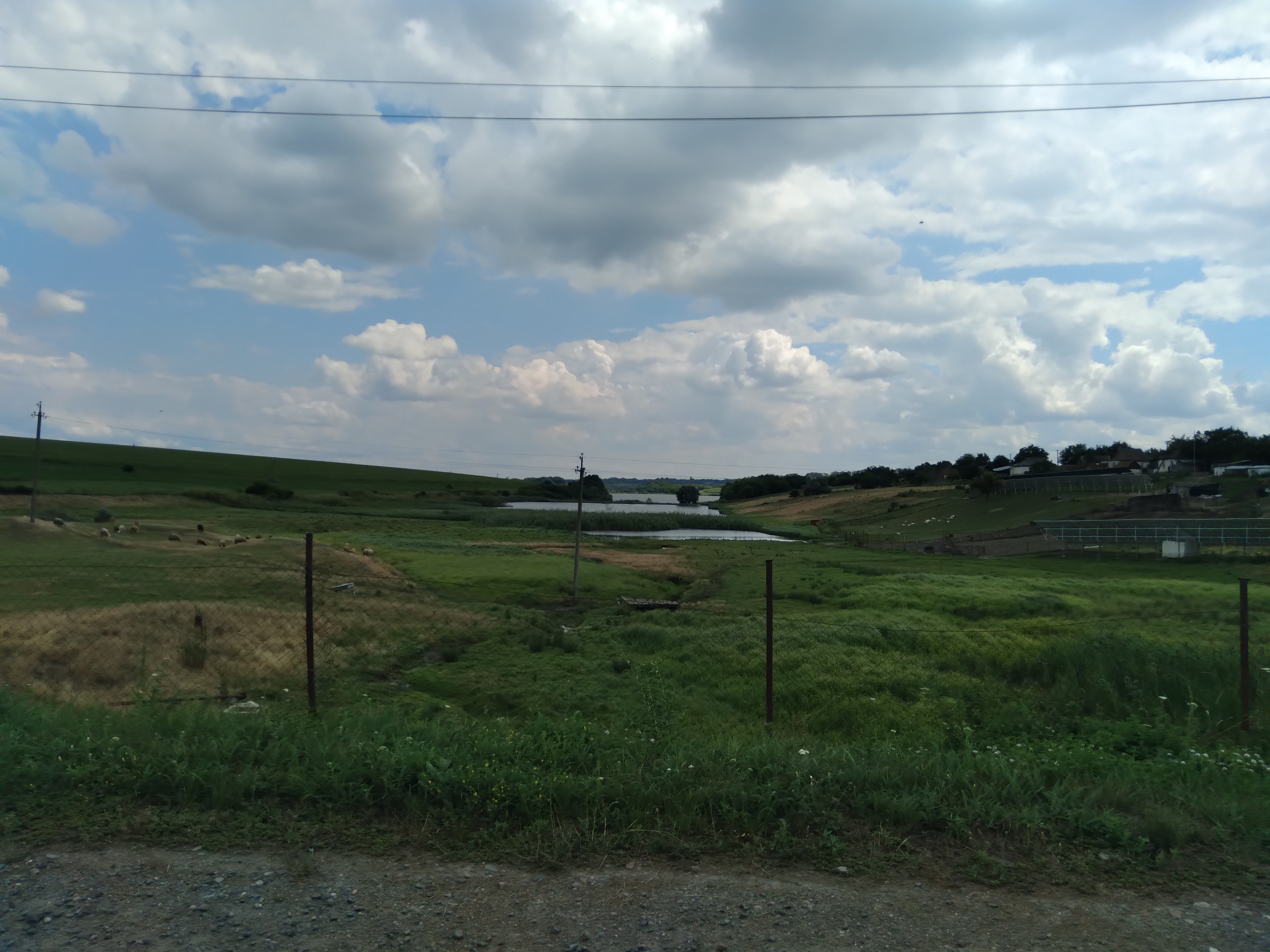

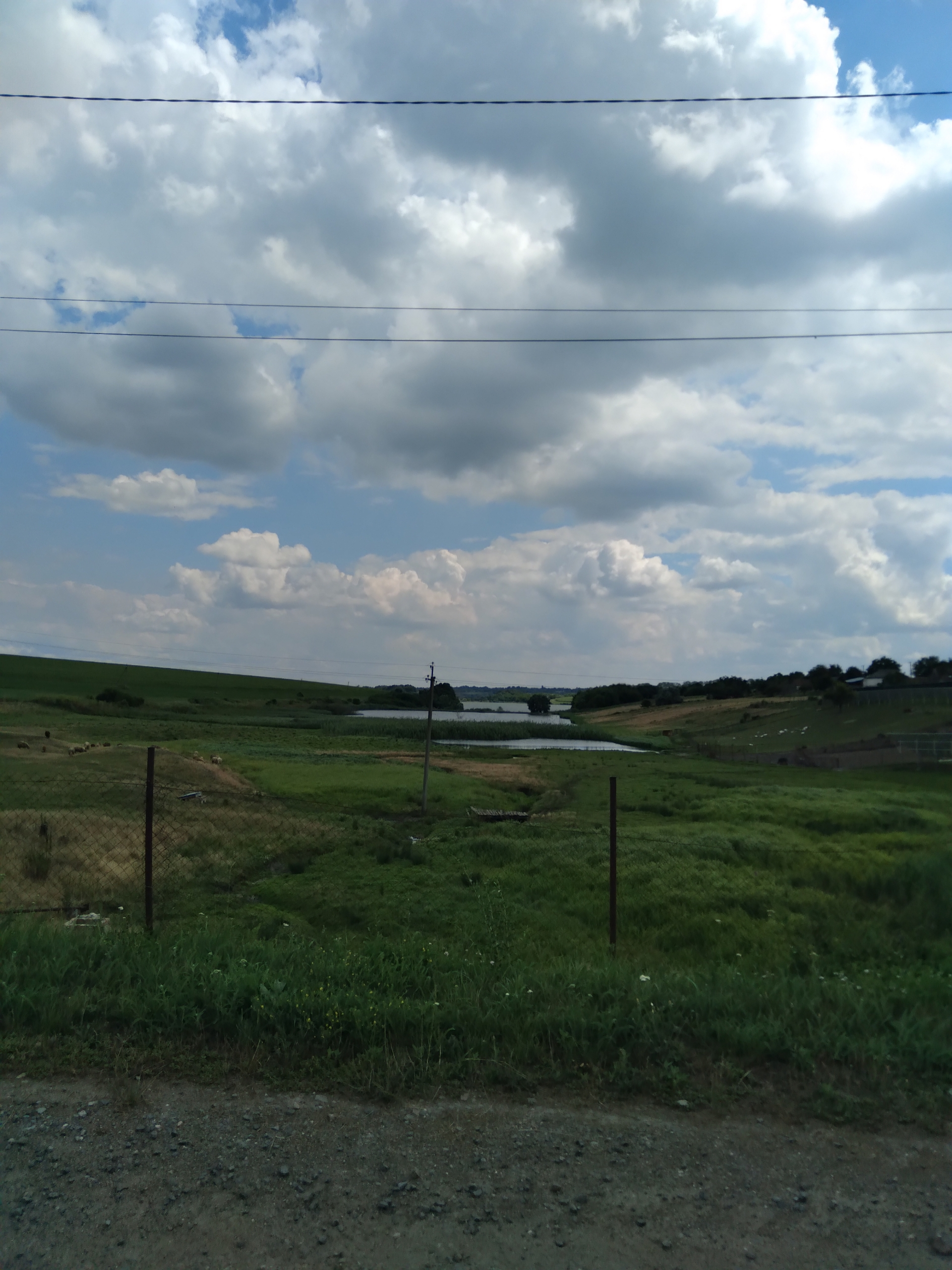

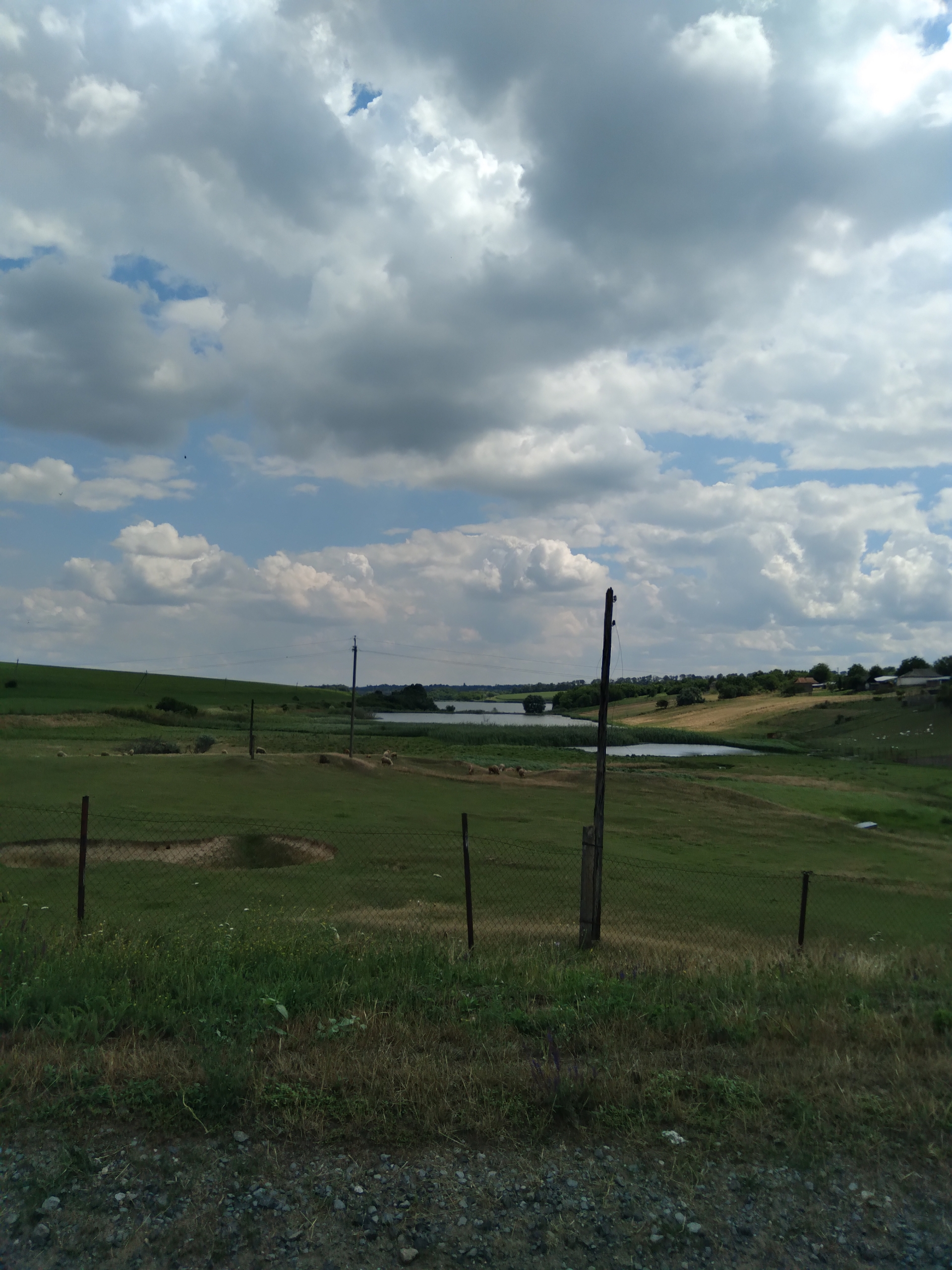

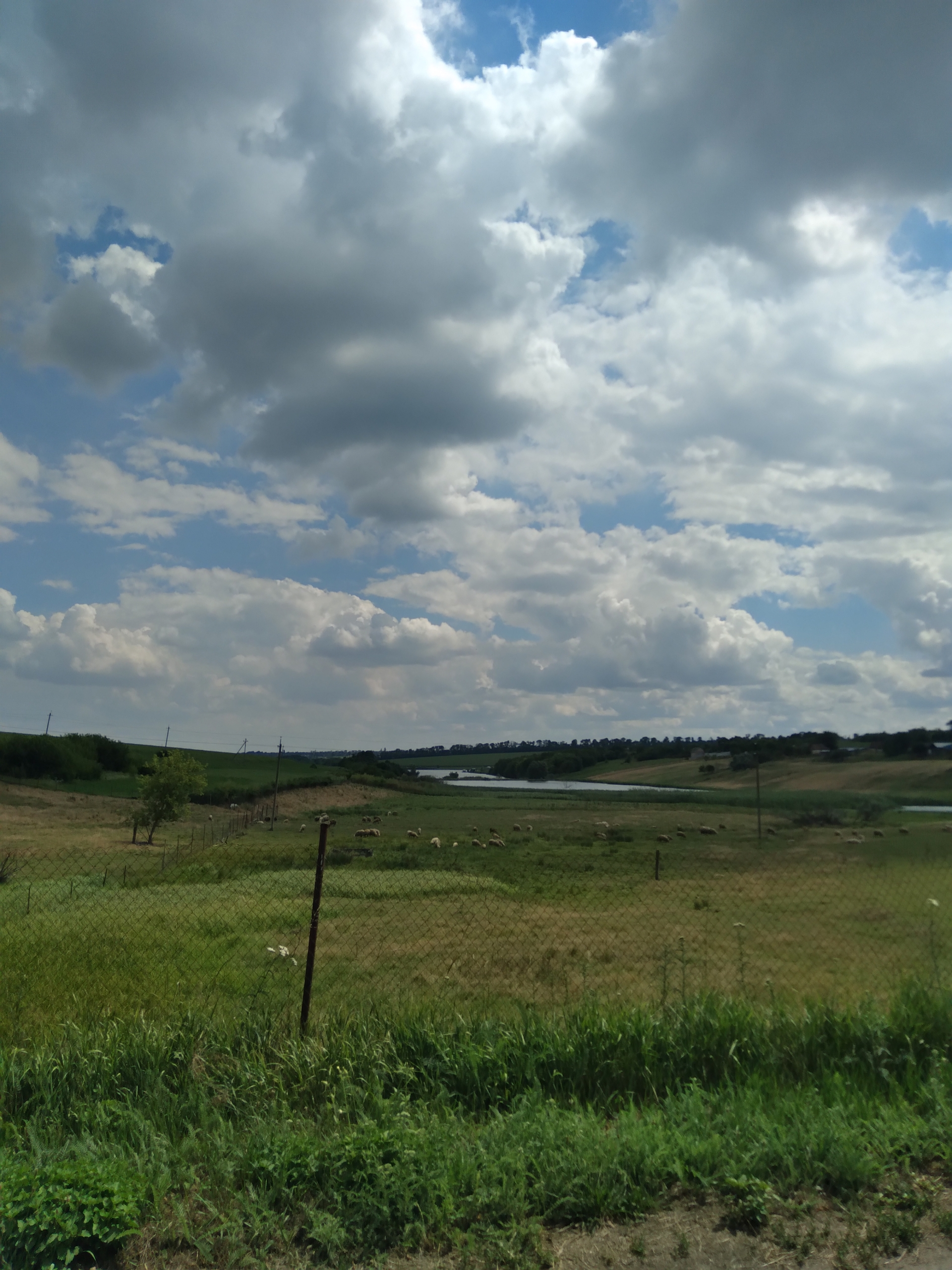

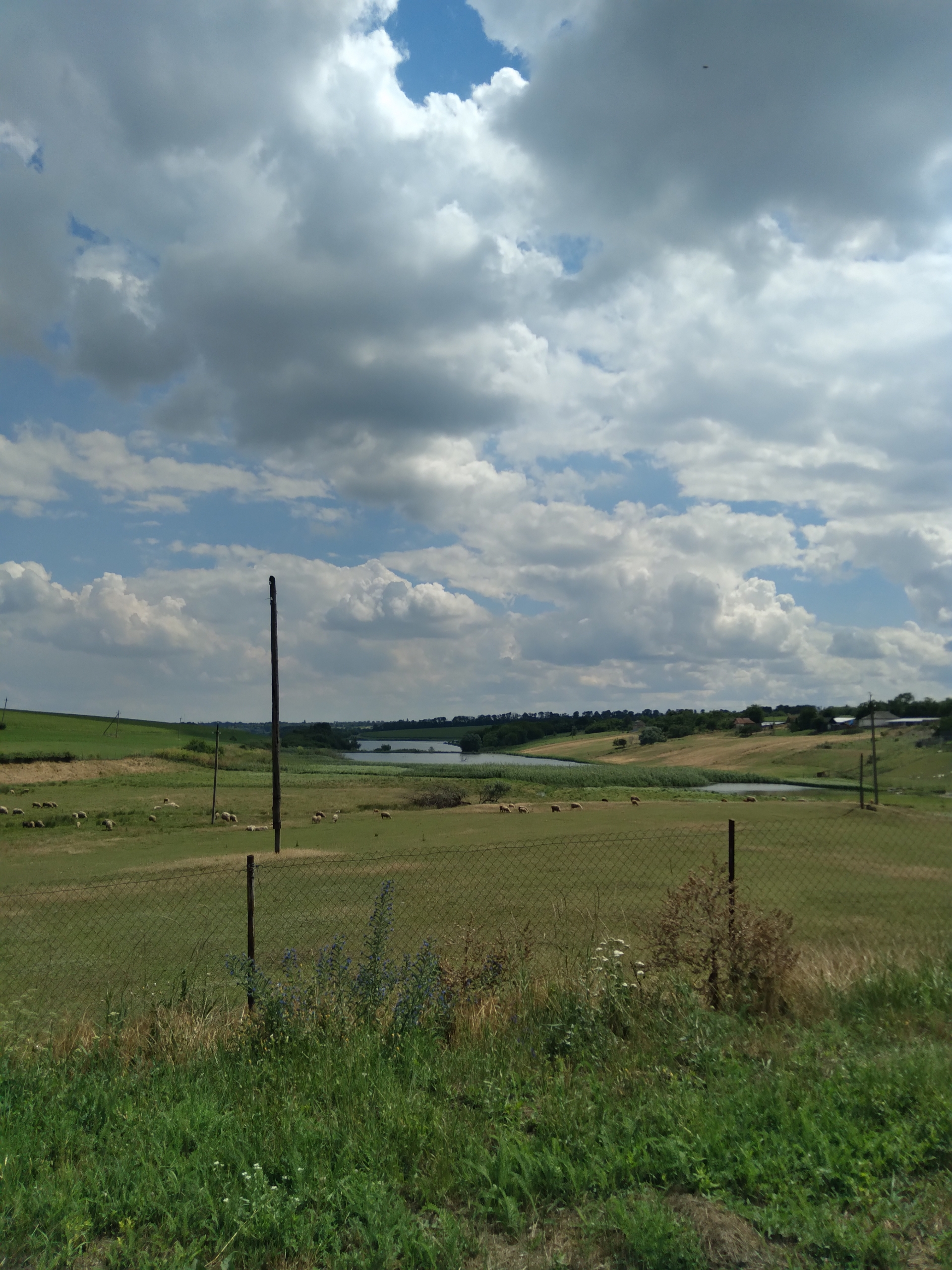

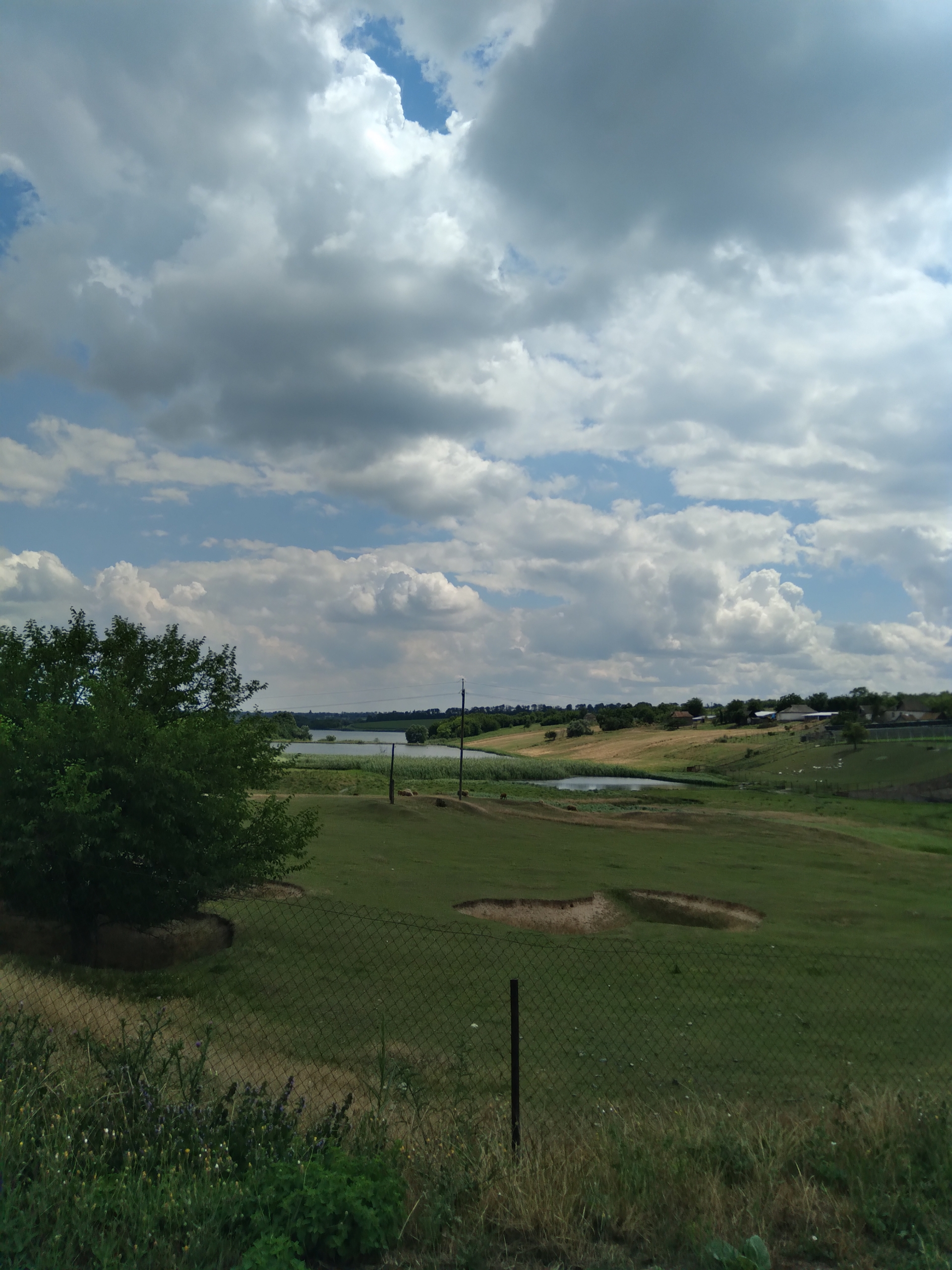
