= Beshka =

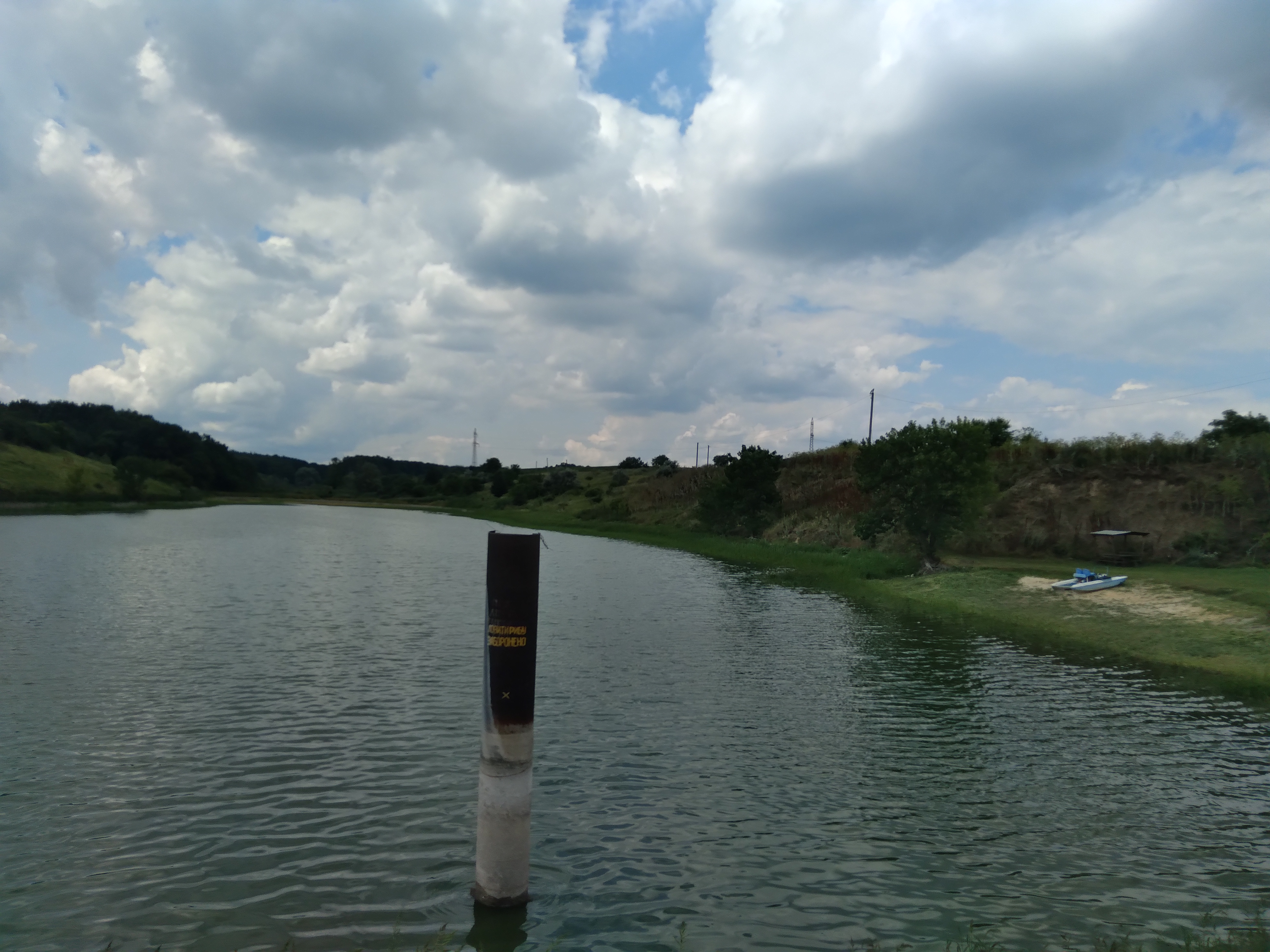

Location
- Country: Ukraine
- Oblast: Kirovohrad Oblast

Physical characteristics
- Source
  - location: Sokilnyky
  - coordinates: 48°40′11″N 32°37′57″E
  - elevation: 150 m
- Mouth: Inhulets
  - coordinates: 48°30′37″N 33°09′37″E
- Basin size: 56 km

Basin features
- Progression: Inhulets

Beshka (Ukrainian: Бешка) is a river in Kirovohrad Oblast, Ukraine. It is a tributary of the Inhulets.

The name of the river comes from Turkish bes or beş, a word meaning "five", or in a religious context, "God given plurality", with the suffix kaja, literally "rock". The town Piatykhatky has a similar origin in Turkish cultural influence.

It begins near the village of Sokilnyky, flows to the southeast through the villages of Volodymyrivka, Moshoryne, Svitlopil, the town of Nova Praha and flows into the Inhulets within the village of Novyi Starodub.
