= Nova Praha =

Rural locality in Kirovohrad Oblast, Ukraine

Nova Praha Нова Прага
- Rural settlement
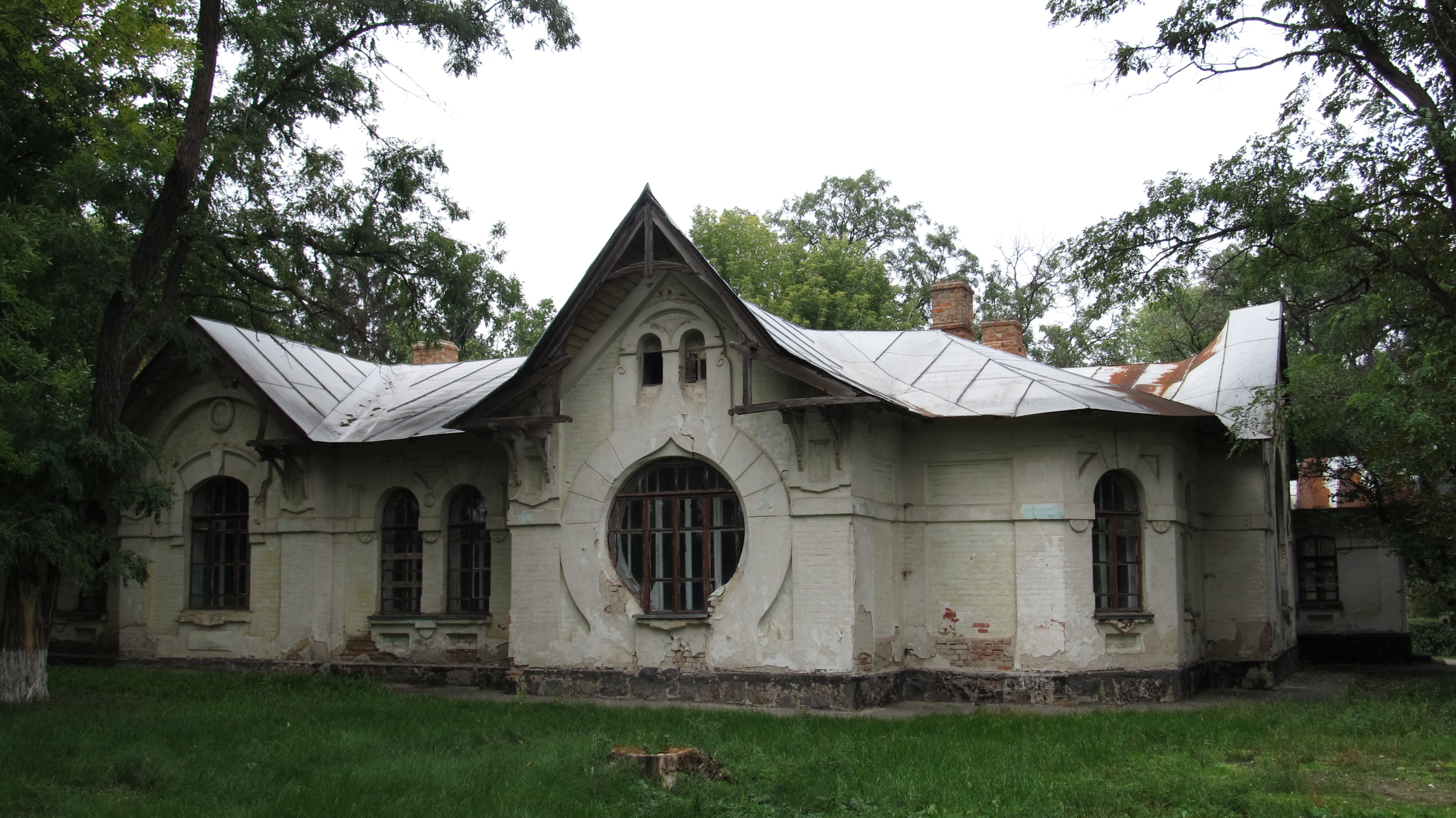

- Location in Kirovohrad Oblast Location in Ukraine
- Coordinates: 48°34′06″N 32°54′14″E
- Country: Ukraine
- Oblast: Kirovohrad Oblast
- Raion: Oleksandriia Raion
- Hromada: Nova Praha settlement hromada

Population (2022)
  - Total: 6,266
- Time zone: UTC+2 (EET)
  - Summer (DST): UTC+3 (EEST)

Nova Praha (Ukrainian: Нова Прага; Russian: Новая Прага) is a rural settlement in Oleksandriia Raion, Kirovohrad Oblast, Ukraine. It is located on the banks of the Beshka, a right tributary of the Inhulets in the basin of the Dnieper. Nova Praha hosts the administration of Nova Praha settlement hromada, one of the hromadas of Ukraine. Population: 6,266 (2022 estimate).

Until 26 January 2024, Nova Praha was designated urban-type settlement. On this day, a new law entered into force which abolished this status, and Nova Praha became a rural settlement.

== Economy ==
=== Transportation ===
The closest railway station is in Sharivka, about 10 kilometres (6.2 mi) southwest of the settlement. It is on the railway connecting Znamianka and Dolynska with further connections to Kropyvnytskyi, Kryvyi Rih, and Mykolaiv. There is infrequent passenger traffic.

The settlement is connected by road with Kropyvnytskyi, Oleksandriia, and Kamianets.

=== Settlement ===
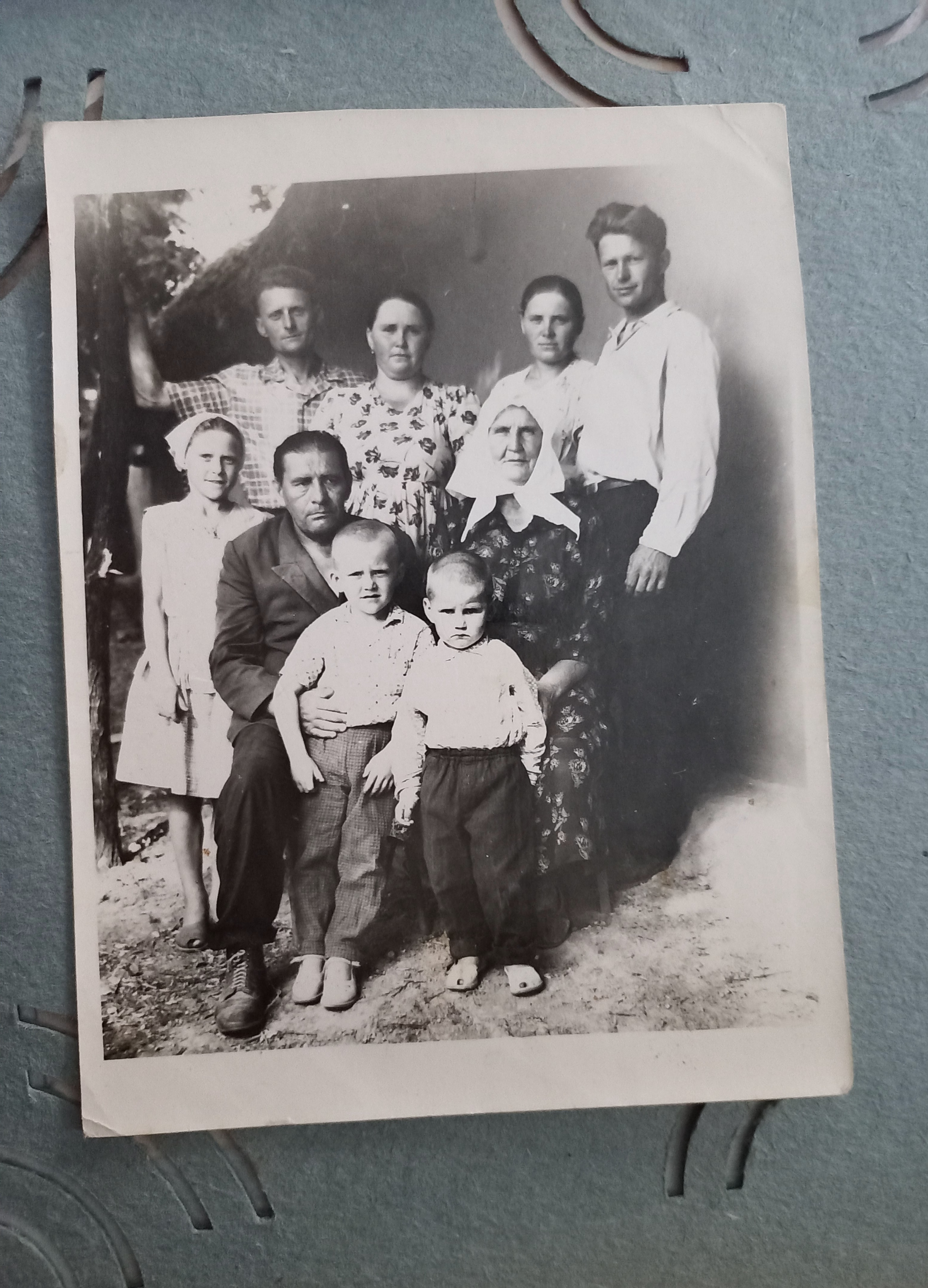
Villagers from Troianka, 1960s

The hromada (community) includes Nova Praha and 11 villages: Veselka, Hayove, Hryhorivka, Kvitneve, Lozuvatka, Oleksandro-Pashchenkove, Pantaziivka, Svitlopil, Troianka, Sharivka and Shevchenkove.
