= Caaschwitz =

- Municipality
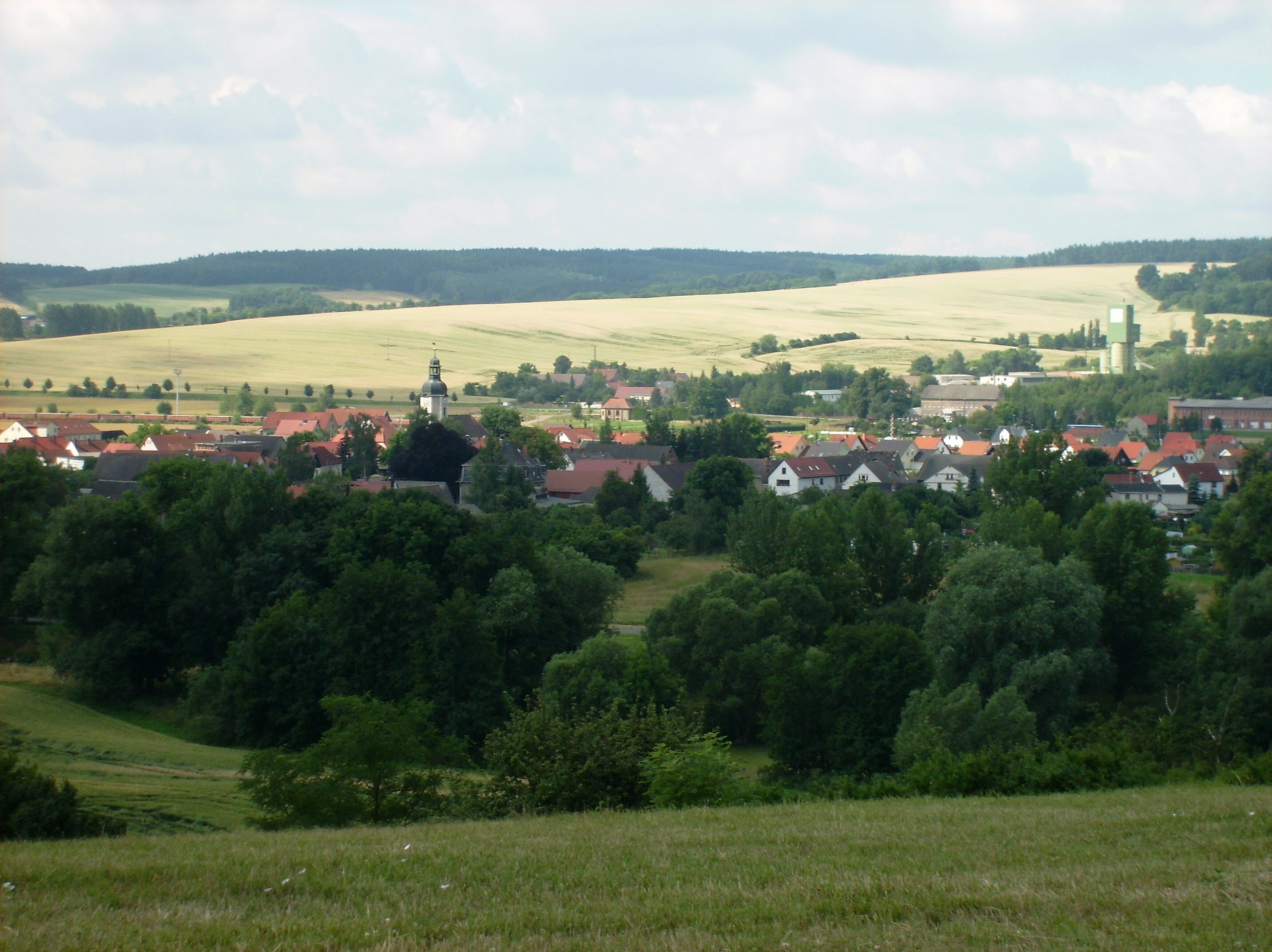
- Caaschwitz seen from the east

- Coat of arms

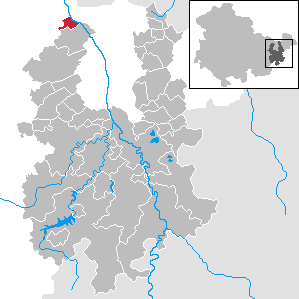
- Location of Caaschwitz within Greiz district
- Interactive map of Caaschwitz
- Location within Germany Location within Thuringia
- Coordinates: 50°57′N 12°0′E
- Country: Germany
- State: Thuringia
- District: Greiz

Government
  - Mayor (2022–28): Dieter Dröse

Area
  - Total: 4.18 km^{2} (1.61 sq mi)
- Elevation: 176 m (577 ft)

Population (2025-12-31)
  - Total: 610
  - Density: 150/km^{2} (380/sq mi)
- Time zone: UTC+01:00 (CET)
  - Summer (DST): UTC+02:00 (CEST)
- Postal codes: 07586
- Dialling codes: 036605
- Vehicle registration: GRZ
- Website: www.caaschwitz.info

Caaschwitz is a municipality in the district of Greiz, in Thuringia, Germany.
