= Krasny Liman =

Krasny Liman Красный Лиман
- Selo
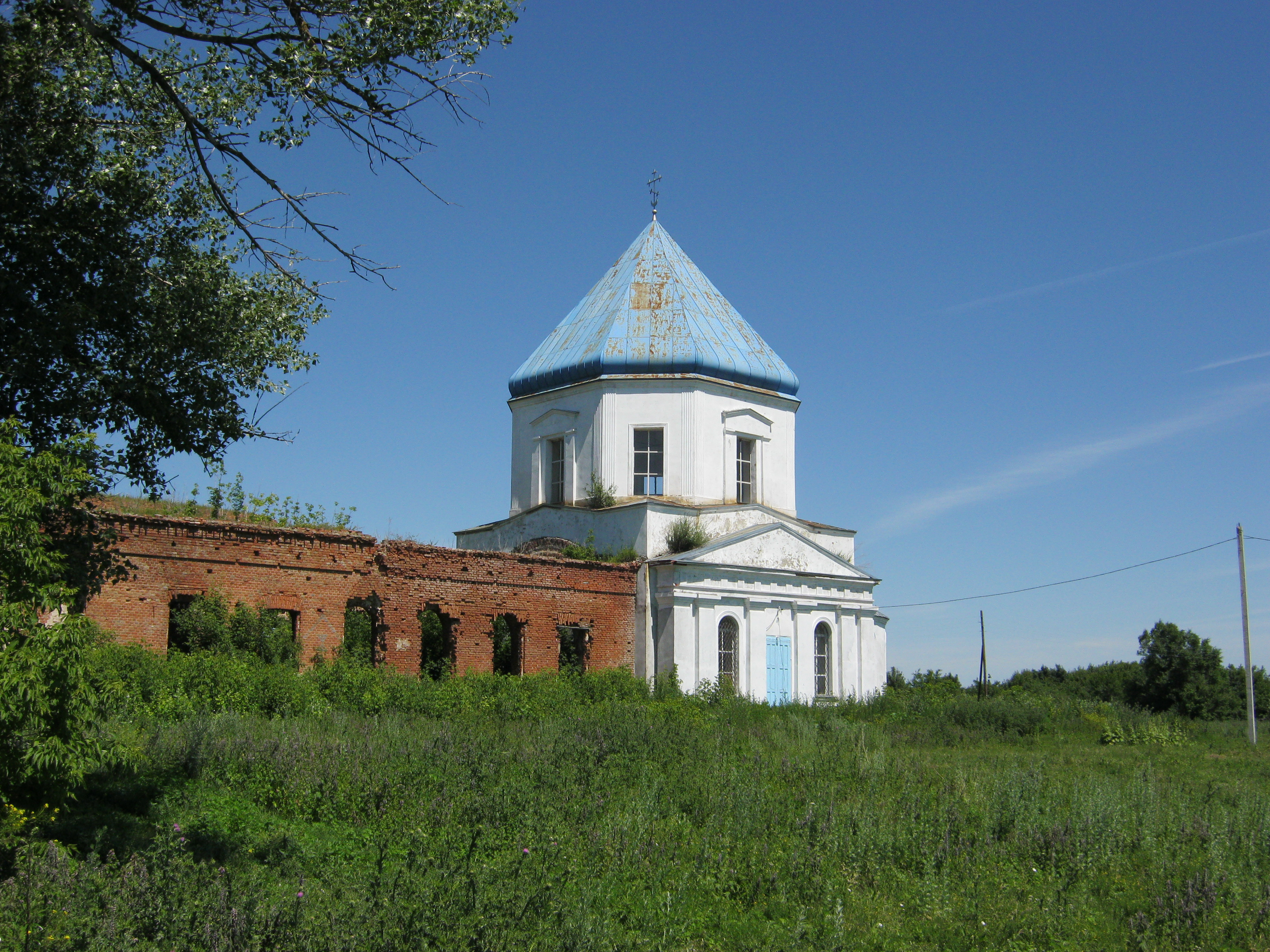
- Krasny Liman in 2012

- Location within Voronezh Oblast Location within Russia
- Coordinates: 51°31′N 39°51′E
- Country: Russia
- Region: Voronezh Oblast
- District: Paninsky District
- Time zone: UTC+3:00

Krasny Liman (Russian: Красный Лиман) is a rural locality (a selo) and the administrative center of Krasnolimanskoye Rural Settlement, Paninsky District, Voronezh Oblast, Russia. The population was 749 in 2010. There are ten streets.

== Geography ==
Krasny Liman is located on the Tamlyk River, 27 km southwest of Panino (the district's administrative centre) by road. Barsuchye is the nearest rural locality.
