= Shevchenkovo =

Shevchenkovo Шевченково
- Selo
- Location within Voronezh Oblast Location within Russia
- Coordinates: 49°50′N 39°47′E
- Country: Russia
- Region: Voronezh Oblast
- District: Kantemirovsky District
- Time zone: UTC+3:00

Shevchenkovo (Russian: Шевченково) is a rural locality (a selo) in Pasekovskoye Rural Settlement, Kantemirovsky District, Voronezh Oblast, Russia. The population was 355 as of 2010. There are 4 streets.

== Geography ==
Shevchenkovo is located 22 km north of Kantemirovka (the district's administrative centre) by road. Pasekovo is the nearest rural locality.
