= Paninsky District =

Paninsky District Панинский район (Russian)
- District
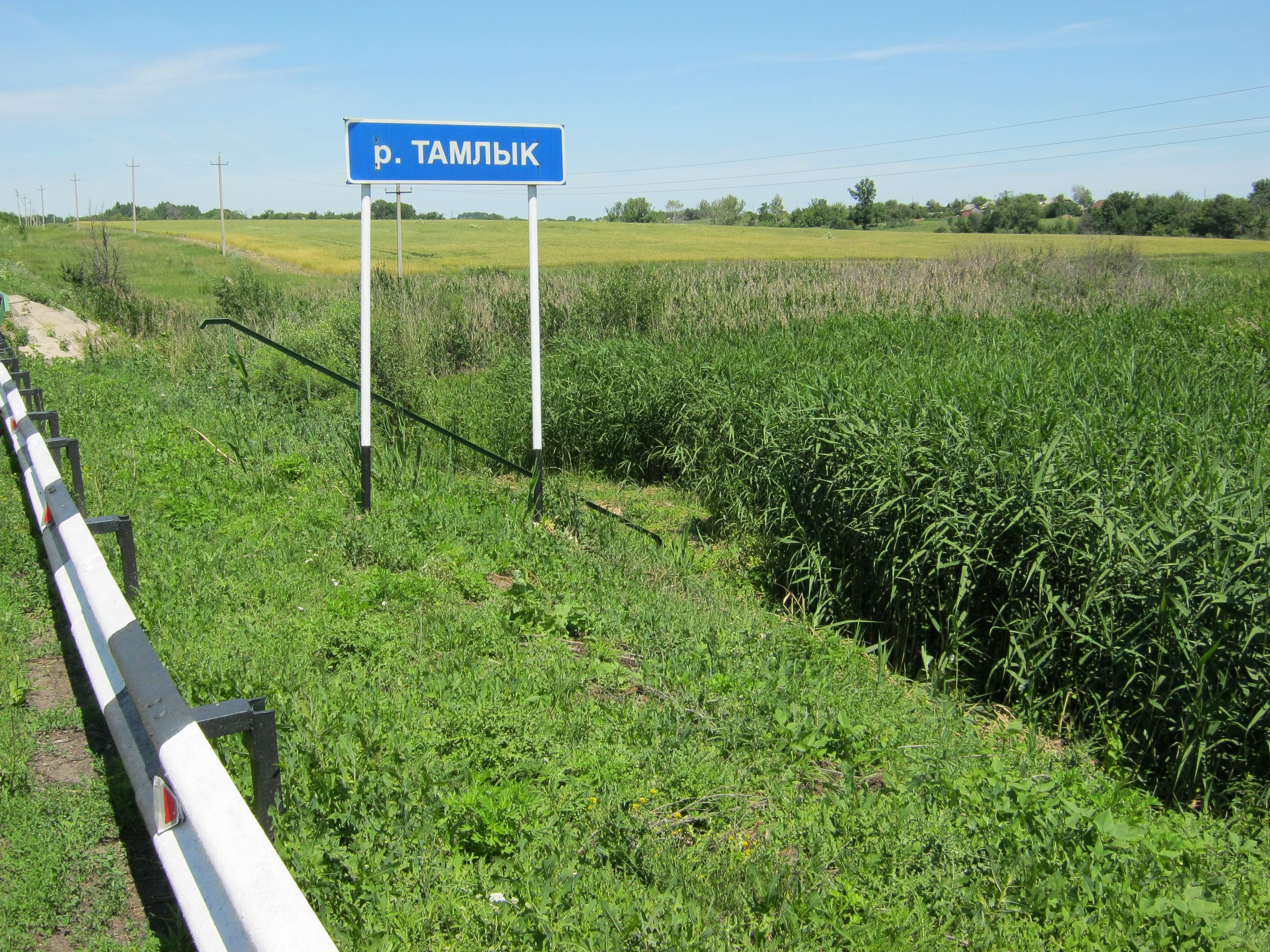
- Crossing over the Tamlyk River near the selo of Krasny Liman in Paninsky District

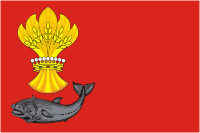
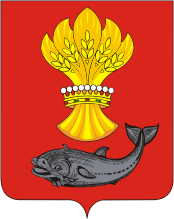
- Flag Coat of arms
- Location of Paninsky District in Voronezh Oblast
- Coordinates: 50°49′N 40°35′E
- Country: Russia
- Federal subject: Voronezh Oblast
- Established: 30 July 1928
- Administrative center: Panino

Area
  - Total: 1,398 km^{2} (540 sq mi)

Population (2010 Census)
  - Total: 29,231
  - Density: 20.91/km^{2} (54.15/sq mi)
  - Urban: 33.5%
  - Rural: 66.5%

Administrative structure
  - Administrative divisions: 2 Urban settlements, 10 Rural settlements
  - Inhabited localities: 2 urban-type settlements, 79 rural localities

Municipal structure
  - Municipally incorporated as: Paninsky Municipal District
  - Municipal divisions: 2 urban settlements, 10 rural settlements
- Time zone: UTC+3 (MSK)
- OKTMO ID: 20635000
- Website: http://www.panino-region.ru

Paninsky District (Russian: Па́нинский райо́н) is an administrative and municipal district (raion), one of the thirty-two in Voronezh Oblast, Russia. It is located in the north of the oblast. The area of the district is 1,398 square kilometers (540 sq mi). Its administrative center is the urban locality (a work settlement) of Panino. Population: 24,236 (2021 census); 29,231 (2010 census); 33,017 (2002 census); 36,143 (1989 Soviet census). The population of Panino accounts for 24.7% of the district's total population.
