= Panino, Voronezh Oblast =

Urban locality in Voronezh Oblast, Russia

Panino Панино
- Urban-type settlement
- Interactive map of Panino
- Location of Panino Panino (Voronezh Oblast)
- Coordinates: 51.6479°N 40.1351°E
- Country: Russia
- Federal subject: Voronezh Oblast
- Administrative district: Paninsky District

Population (2010 Census)
  - Total: 6,672
  - Estimate (2021): 5,995 (−10.1%)
- Time zone: UTC+3 (MSK)
- Postal code: 396140
- OKTMO ID: 20635151051

Panino (Russian: Па́нино) is an urban locality (an urban-type settlement) in Paninsky District of Voronezh Oblast, Russia. Population: 5,995 (2021 census); 6,672 (2010 census); 7,264 (2002 census); 7,918 (1989 Soviet census).
