= Artyomovo =

Artyomovo (Russian: Артёмово) is the name of the following rural localities in Russia:

- Artyomovo, Vladimir Oblast, a village in Malyginskoye Rural Settlement of Kovrovsky District, Vladimir Oblast
- Artyomovo, Voronezh Oblast, a village in Lizinovskoye Rural Settlement of Rossoshansky District, Voronezh Oblast
