= 124th Rifle Division =

124th Rifle Division (August 25, 1939 – December 27, 1941) 124th Rifle Division (December 27, 1941 - November 17, 1942) 124th Rifle Division (April 19, 1943 - November 1945)
- Active: 1939–1945
- Country: Soviet Union
- Branch: Red Army (1939-46)
- Type: Infantry
- Size: Division
- Engagements: Operation Barbarossa; Battle of Brody (1941); Battle of Kiev (1941); Second Battle of Kharkov; Case Blue; Battle of Stalingrad; Siege of Leningrad; Mga offensive Leningrad–Novgorod offensive Battle of Narva (1944); Battle of Vyborg Bay (1944); East Prussian offensive Battle of Königsberg; Samland offensive Soviet invasion of Manchuria; Khingan–Mukden Operation
- Decorations: Order of the Red Banner; Order of Suvorov (both 3rd Formation)
- Battle honours: Mga; Khingan (both 3rd Formation)

Commanders
- Notable commanders: Maj. Gen. Filipp Grigorevich Sushchii; Col. Timofei Yakovlevich Novikov; Col. Aleksandr Kondratevich Berestov; Col. Aleksandr Ivanovich Belov; Col. Fyodor Fyodorovich Shishov; Maj. Gen. Mikhail Danilovich Papchenko

The 124th Rifle Division was first formed as an infantry division of the Red Army in August 1939, in the Ukrainian Military District, based on the shtat (table of organization and equipment) of the following month. It remained in western Ukraine until the start of the German invasion when it was part of 5th Army in the Kiev Special Military District with its forward elements on the frontier facing units of the German 6th Army. It was largely overwhelmed in the first days, being repeatedly encircled and forced to escape. During July, as the fighting front moved east, the remainder of the 124th passed through the German rear, covering some 600km through the Pripet Marshes, with its commander killed in action during this journey. Finally reaching Soviet lines in Belarus in a much reduced state late in the month, it went back into battle north of Kyiv, eventually being transferred to 37th Army, until its remaining personnel were incorporated into 1st Airborne Corps. This unit was effectively destroyed in the Kyiv pocket in September.

A new 124th was formed based on a cadre of the original division near Voronezh beginning in late December and by January 1942 it was already at the front near Kharkiv as part of 21st Army and later 38th Army in Southwestern Front. After fighting for a bridgehead over the Donets River in March it attacked again toward Kharkiv in May, but was counterattacked on the second day and badly battered. Following the failure of this offensive the division found itself in the path of German summer offensive toward Stalingrad, first under 28th Army before returning to the 21st, as it made a reasonably effective fighting withdrawal to and over the Don River. During August it pushed back across the river with other units of the 21st and 63rd Armies against the Italian 8th Army to create a substantial bridgehead west of Serafimovich, which would be an important springboard for the upcoming winter counteroffensive. During October it attacked and caused serious losses against the Romanian forces now facing the bridgehead. Days before the start of Operation Uranus the 124th was redesignated as the 50th Guards Rifle Division.

The final 124th was formed on April 19, 1943, based on a trio of rifle brigades in 67th Army of Leningrad Front. It quickly entered the fighting front along a quiet sector and saw little combat until September when it took part in the successful effort to take the German strongpoint at Sinyavino. In January 1944, during the offensive that finally drove Army Group North away from Leningrad, it helped liberate the town of Mga and received its name as a battle honor. As the offensive continued it was transferred to 42nd Army, then 8th and 2nd Shock Armies, and was awarded the Order of the Red Banner before taking part in the fighting around Narva. It then moved back to the Leningrad region in preparation for the invasion of Finland. As part of 59th Army it made successful amphibious landings on several islands in Vyborg Bay in early July before going over to the defense for the rest of the summer. In September it was assigned to 21st Army in the Reserve of the Supreme High Command, where it remained, with one short return to the front, into December. It was now assigned to 39th Army in 3rd Belorussian Front for the offensive into East Prussia in January 1945. In recognition of its role in breaking through the German defenses it was awarded the Order of Suvorov. After Königsberg was taken in early April the 124th took part in clearing the Sambia Peninsula, and at the start of May began moving by rail to the far east. Under Transbaikal Front it advanced through the Greater Khingan range, inflicting several defeats on the defending Kwantung Army in the brief campaign and receiving "Khingan" as its second honorific. Within months it had been disbanded.

== 1st Formation ==
The division was originally formed at Zhytomyr in the Ukrainian Military District on August 25, 1939, based on a cadre from the 15th Rifle Division. Kombrig Filipp Grigorevich Sushchii, who had previously served as chief of staff of both the 23rd and 5th Cavalry Divisions, was given command in September; he would have his rank modernized to that of major general on June 4, 1940. During the Soviet invasion of Poland in September 1939 the division was subordinated to the 37th Rifle Corps but it did not see service. At the start of the German invasion on June 22, 1941, it was part of 5th Army's 27th Rifle Corps in the Kiev Special Military District (soon redesignated as Southwestern Front). At this time its order of battle was as follows:

- 406th Rifle Regiment (located at Horokhiv)
- 622nd Rifle Regiment (located at Poritske)
- 781st Rifle Regiment (located at Tartakove)
- 469th Light Artillery Regiment (located at Branakh)
- 341st Howitzer Artillery Regiment (located at Slasove and Fusove)
- 202nd Antitank Battalion
- 119th Antiaircraft Battalion
- 193rd Reconnaissance Company
- 225th Sapper Battalion
- 200th Signal Battalion
- 144th Medical/Sanitation Battalion
- 120th Chemical Defense (Anti-gas) Company
- 118th Motor Transport Battalion
- 147th Field Bakery
- 566th Field Postal Station
- 343rd Field Office of the State Bank

The division had a total of 9,426 personnel on strength, including 925 officers and 1,530 non-commissioned officers, and these were armed with 7,786 rifles, 265 submachine guns, 481 light machine guns, 162 heavy machine guns, 54 45mm antitank guns, four 37mm and four 76mm antiaircraft guns, 34 76mm cannons and regimental guns, 32 122mm and 12 152mm howitzers, 12 120mm, 46 82mm, and 83 50mm mortars, 11 tankettes (T-37, T-38, or T-40), 11 armored cars, 248 trucks, 64 tractors, and 1,771 horses.

Sushchii's headquarters was at Horokhiv, while forward elements were along the frontier as far as Romosh and Sokal. These detachments, supported by 27th Corps' 21st Artillery Regiment, were in action by 0900 hours. However, the bulk of the division was still marching up when around 1100 it began to encounter advance units of German 6th Army. Under the circumstances there was no choice but to go into combat off the march, and while the rifle regiments put up a stiff fight and even counterattacked in places, they had no fixed defenses, leaving them vulnerable to encirclement. The division was already outflanked, with German units in Stoyanov, about 25km from the border. By 1300 the 14th Panzer Division had opened a 20km-wide gap between the 124th and the adjacent 87th Rifle Division, which was exploited by the following German troops. Both Soviet divisions attempted to hold along the "Molotov Line" but by evening German infantry had reached the railway between Sokal and Vladimir-Volinsky.

=== Battle of Brody ===
Battle of Brody. Note position of the 124th at Horokhiv.

The next day the 406th Rifle Regiment was still holding at Horokhiv with the divisional headquarters, while the remaining regiments were facing encirclement in and around Myliatyn. 14th Panzer had diverted to the north, and the 75th Infantry Division was advancing on Horokhiv as 11th Panzer Division pushed eastward through its lines in the general direction of Dubno. This would lead to arguably the largest tank battle of the war over the rest of June, but the 124th was largely concerned with extricating itself from its impossible position. On June 25 Horokhiv fell after being encircled, and General Sushchii was wounded during a night attack to escape the pocket. At about this time the division incorporated the remnants of the 90th NKVD Border Guards, which had lost up to 80 percent of its strength in the frontier battles. By June 27 the scattered elements of the division, now well in the German rear, had partly joined up with its corps-mate, the 135th Rifle Division, and was moving north. This march continued through July 1, crossing the Vladimir-Volinsky–Lutsk highway.

As of July 10 the 27th Corps had been disbanded and the 124th was under direct command of 5th Army, although still out of communication. As its retreat continued, primarily through the Pripet Marshes, on July 14 General Sushchii was wounded again, this time fatally. He would be buried en route, while Col. Timofei Yakovlevich Novikov, commander of the 406th Regiment, took over command, which he would hold for the remainder of the existence of the 1st formation. Through this entire withdrawal of some 600km the division managed to hold on to its combat banners, records, and personal weapons. On July 24 it reached Soviet lines near Belokorovichy with 1,600 personnel still under arms, and three artillery pieces. By the end of the month, as stragglers came in, along with some individual replacements, its strength had increased to about 2,000.

=== Battle of Kiev ===
The 124th remained in combat through August, covering the north flank of the Kiev Fortified Region, and despite receiving 1,000 reservists mid-month was still down to 1,200 personnel two weeks later, by which time it had been transferred to 37th Army, still in Southwestern Front. On September 4 its remaining personnel were incorporated into 1st Airborne Corps, while its command cadre was moved east from what would soon become the Kiev encirclement. 1st Airborne was not so fortunate and would be largely destroyed by the end of the month. The division was officially written off on December 27.

== 2nd Formation ==
The day the 1st formation was deleted from the Red Army order of battle a new 124th was designated in the reserves of Southwestern Front, near Voronezh. It was based on the command cadre of the original division and Colonel Novikov was in command for just two days before returning to command of the 406th Regiment and being replaced by Col. Aleksandr Kondratevich Berestov. Novikov took command of the 181st Rifle Division on June 1, 1942, but was taken prisoner on August 15 and died in captivity in December 1944. The new division's order of battle was similar to that of the 1st formation:

- 406th Rifle Regiment
- 622nd Rifle Regiment
- 781st Rifle Regiment
- 46th Artillery Regiment
- 202nd Antitank Battalion (from January 19, 1942)
- 405th Antiaircraft Battery (later 119th Antiaircraft Battalion)
- 531st Mortar Battalion
- 193rd Reconnaissance Company
- 225th Sapper Battalion
- 200th Signal Battalion
- 144th Medical/Sanitation Battalion
- 120th Chemical Defense (Anti-gas) Company
- 118th Motor Transport Company
- 147th Field Bakery
- 30th Divisional Veterinary Hospital
- 566th Field Postal Station
- 343rd Field Office of the State Bank

A large number of the personnel were wounded veterans of earlier battles, filled out by recent conscripts. The experienced 46th Artillery Regiment came from the 100th Rifle Division. After a very brief period for forming up the division was assigned to 21st Army in the same front in January for the first attempt to retake Kharkiv, and then to Maj. Gen. K. S. Moskalenko's 38th Army on February 25. Under this command it fought a costly battle alongside the 81st Rifle Division for a bridgehead over the Donets River at Staryi Saltiv in March. This would serve as a springboard for a new offensive.

== Second Battle of Kharkiv ==
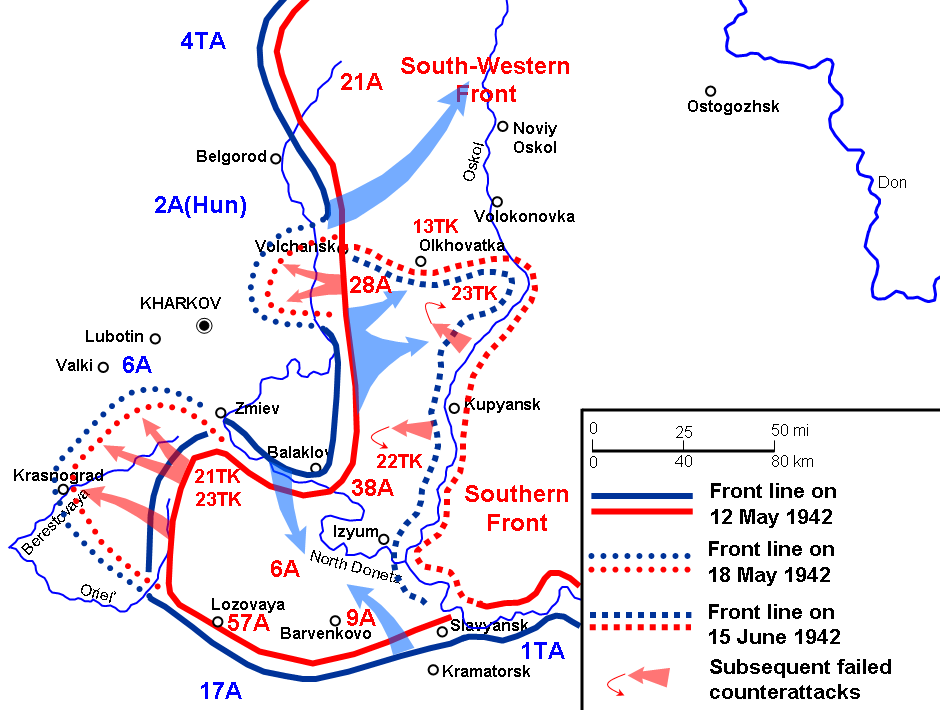
Map of 1942 Kharkiv offensive. Note position of 38th Army.

While 21st Army had been attempting to reach Kharkiv in January, the 6th, 9th and 57th Armies had broken the German front along the Donets and carved out a salient up to 75km deep between Izium and Barvinkove. Marshal S. K. Timoshenko, who was now in command of the Southwestern Theatre (Direction), submitted a plan to the STAVKA on April 10 which called for a two-pronged offensive to encircle and liberate Kharkiv; 6th Army would attack northward from the Izium–Barvenkove salient while the 21st, 28th and 38th Armies would strike westward. The 38th Army strike force would consist of the 124th, 226th, and 300th Rifle Divisions plus one regiment of the 81st Division. This would be backed by two tank brigades and almost all of the Army's artillery assets, while the remainder of the 81st and another tank brigade formed the second echelon.

When the offensive began on May 12 the strike force was deployed on the sector of Dragunovka, Peschanoe, and Piatnitskoe within the Staryi Saltiv bridgehead. The 124th was in the center, tying in with the 226th to its right and the regiment of the 81st to its left. These divisions faced the 513th Regiment of the German 294th Infantry Division. Following a 60-minute artillery preparation, including a 15-20-minute air raid, the attack began at 0730 hours and gained up to 10km during the day, with the 226th making the most progress and capturing Hill 124 in the process. The 124th exploited this success. It had the 13th Tank Brigade in direct support and by day's end had crossed the Bolshaya Babka River, driving German forces out of their strongpoint at Peschanoe with an enveloping attack from the north and east by the 781st Regiment. Moskalenko, who had been observing the battle from Berestov's forward observation post, committed the remainder of the 81st during the day. By evening it was clear to Soviet intelligence that 38th Army was facing two German divisions (the second being the 71st) instead of the one it had been expecting.

During the first half of the following day, 38th Army's shock group made impressive gains as the German lines fell back; taking advantage of this success the 13th Guards and 244th Rifle Divisions of 28th Army also advanced. However, starting at 1300 hours, a concerted German counterthrust, led by 3rd and 23rd Panzer Divisions and supported by three infantry regiments, struck the 124th and 81st Divisions "on the nose" and sent them reeling back. Under this pressure, the shaken rifle divisions withdrew as best they could to the Bolshaia Babka River. The 124th was the focus of the attack and took heavy casualties. The 622nd Regiment, under command of Maj. V. A. Mamontov, was moving on Chervona Roga when it encountered about 80 tanks of 3rd Panzer with infantry support. A battery of the 46th Artillery and the regiment's antitank and regimental guns destroyed 12 panzers, but nevertheless it was essentially crushed. The 781st on its left was also forced back, leading to both being encircled at Peschanoe by armored spearheads. The fighting continued until evening until Moskalenko organized a relief force based on the 133rd Tank Brigade which broke through the German perimeter. Covered by army-level artillery fire the battered divisions managed to stabilize on the new line, but after suffering thousands of casualties the 38th Army's offensive capabilities were finished. Worse, from Timoshenko's point of view, the two panzer divisions had only 10-20 percent of their armor knocked out, leaving them in good shape to intervene elsewhere.

On May 15 Timoshenko ordered Moskalenko 38th Army to maintain the defensive. The offensive was resumed on May 18 in an effort to pin down the panzers before they could move south; the 124th and 226th Divisions gained up to 2km and the depleted tank brigades were ordered to exploit, but this came to nothing. While this was happening a disaster was brewing in the Izium–Barvenkove salient where three Soviet armies were encircled by May 24 and soon destroyed. The 124th escaped this fate, but had been significantly depleted during the offensive.

=== Operation Wilhelm ===
In the aftermath of the offensive the 28th Army took over responsibility for the defenses of the Staryi Saltiv bridgehead and the 124th came under its command. As a preliminary to the main German summer offensive Gen. F. Paulus, commander of 6th Army, intended to eliminate the bridgehead in a pincer attack in order to gain crossing points over the Donets. Altogether the bridgehead contained seven rifle divisions, all of which were understrength, backed by four weak tank brigades, three more rifle divisions (including the 124th) and three cavalry divisions. The assault began early on June 10 and took the defenders by surprise. The four infantry divisions of VIII Army Corps took only two days to clear the bridgehead and capture Vovchansk. Meanwhile, the III Motorized Corps broke through the defenses of 38th Army to the south. Under the circumstances the 28th Army began retreating almost as soon as the German attack was underway. Rainy weather began on June 11 and this slowed the advance, along with defensive actions and counterattacks by the tank brigades. By the time the pincers closed on June 15 most of the Soviet forces had escaped, losing 24,800 men taken prisoner.

== Operation Blue ==
By June 28 the division had returned to 21st Army, still in Southwestern Front. On the same date the main German offensive began. 21st and 40th Armies were the chief targets for encirclement by Army Group South in the initial phase. 21st Army had seven rifle divisions, including the 124th, in the first echelon and two in the second. Once the storm broke, during the month of July, the division and its Army could do little except stage a costly fighting withdrawal across the steppes. On July 6 Colonel Berestov left the division and was replaced by Col. Aleksandr Ivanovich Belov. This officer had previously led the 1st and 33rd Motorized Rifle Brigades. In the Red Army General Staff report of July 12 it was stated:

21st Army is defending its previous positions along the eastern bank of the Don River with the forces of 3rd Cavalry Corps, 124th Rifle Division, 4th Antitank Brigade, and 51st Guards-Mortar Regiment. After pressing back its combat security, the enemy occupied the northwestern outskirts of Staraia Kalitva at 0530 hours on 11 July.

By August 1 it had been incorporated into the new Stalingrad Front, fighting west of the Don. Between July 7 and August 6 the remaining personnel and equipment of the 226th Division were incorporated into the 124th and 76th Rifle Divisions.

By mid-August, as German 6th Army prepared for the next phase of its offensive, the 21st was defending along a sector some 40km wide on the north bank of the Don from the area of Melokletsky west to the Khoper River, 30km west of Serafimovich. It had five divisions, with the 124th in the center from Podpeshinsky to Sychevsky, plus the 343rd Rifle Division in the 4th Tank Army's bridgehead south of the river and the 63rd Rifle Division in reserve. The main attack was directed at 4th Tank and began on August 15. This Army's forces were quickly either encircled or withdrawing, and by August 17 was "no longer combat capable." 21st Army was ordered to take over a sector on the right flank of 1st Guards Army and assist what remained of 4th Tank in holding what remained of its bridgehead.

In an effort to retrieve the situation the Front commander, Col. Gen. A. I. Yeryomenko, issued orders for coordinated counterattacks to tie down 6th Army on August 19-20. 21st Army was to attack on a line from Zimovskii to Kuznechikov (15km east of the Khoper) toward Verkhne-Fomikhinskii with the 96th and 304th Rifle Divisions. If successful this would be followed by a general attack by the Army's remaining forces. In the event this effort made little impact on the German plan to advance to the Volga on August 21.

=== The Serafimovich Bridgehead ===
In order to free up 6th Army forces to make the advance to Stalingrad the Italian 8th Army had been moved into a long sector south of the Don on August 15 facing 21st and 63rd Armies. The latter attacked across the river at dawn on August 20 and immediately broke through the defenses of the Italian 2nd Infantry Division, creating a bridgehead 2-3km deep. The 304th and 96th Rifle Divisions attempted a similar result against German 79th Infantry Division in the Serafimovich area with less success. Over the next two days 63rd Army extended its gains, which allowed the 304th to make a crossing. By August 25 the 21st Army was continuing to attack, with the 124th concentrated southwest of Novoaleksandrovka, tasked with relieving units of the 96th on the night of August 28. Once this was completed the two Armies had created a lodgement 50km wide and as much as 25km deep. Stalingrad Front reported 1,200 prisoners taken, along with 30 guns, 65 mortars, 265 machine guns, 1,250 rifles, and 30 trucks, plus a large amount of ammunition and other supplies. The two Armies now dug deep defenses, while the STAVKA noted the weakness and poor performance of the Italians.

By this time German 6th Army had driven a long, narrow corridor from the Don to the northern outskirts of Stalingrad. Army Gen. G. K. Zhukov had been appointed to the role of Deputy Supreme Commander to coordinate the defense of the city on August 26. He saw the corridor as vulnerable to a counterstroke, prompting the STAVKA to form the new 24th and 66th Armies to strike from the north with 1st Guards Army. This led to the first of a series of Kotluban offensives, none of which succeeded in their goal of cutting off 6th Army, but did distract from the battle for the city itself. The first offensive began on September 3, and the next day the 124th and 304th Divisions began a heavy diversionary attack against the 79th Infantry south of Serafimovich, which succeeded in tying it down.

Between October 1-10 Army Army Group B carried a complicated series of regroupings which shifted the Romanian 3rd Army into the positions previously occupied by the Italian 8th. Beginning on the night of October 13/14, the 124th, along with the 14th Guards Rifle Division, began an intense probing attack against the Romanian forces which continued until the 16th. The intention was to draw German forces away from Stalingrad, but not incidentally, these attacks, along with another by 76th Division on October 24–27, inflicted 13,154 casualties on the 3rd Army, roughly the equivalent of what the British 8th Army would suffer in the concurrent Second Battle of El Alamein.

During earlier fighting in the bridgehead on October 3, Sen. Lt. Mikhail Arsentyevich Kuznetsov of the 622nd Rifle Regiment had led a group of his submachine-gunners in a successful battle in the area of Senyutkino Farm against two enemy-held bunkers. On the second day of Operation Uranus, he would further distinguish himself and was personally credited with 88 killed and 64 prisoners, but also received five wounds. The journalist Ilya Ehrenburg wrote an account of this action entitled "Good morning, Guards!" On February 14, 1943, Kuznetsov was made a Hero of the Soviet Union. A month later, he was severely wounded and concussed, and he spent most of the rest of the war in political work.

In a November strength return it was reported that the division's personnel were 80 percent Russian, with the remainder of various Asian nationalities. On November 17 in recognition of its successes against the Romanians, the division was redesignated as the 50th Guards Rifle Division. Ten days later, in the midst of Uranus, Colonel Belov would be promoted to the rank of major general. He would go on to lead the 29th and 3rd Guards Rifle Corps, but was severely wounded on March 28, 1944, and died in hospital on April 8.

== 3rd Formation ==
The final formation of the 124th took place in 67th Army of Leningrad Front on April 19, 1943. It was based on an amalgamation three rifle brigades.

=== 56th Naval Rifle Brigade ===
This brigade was formed from personnel of the Baltic Fleet during July-August 1942 in the naval base at Kronstadt. It came under command of Leningrad Front, first as part of the Coastal Operational Group before moving to 67th Army in January 1943. During most of this time it was designated as a regular rifle brigade. The next month it was reassigned to 55th Army but returned to 67th Army to help form the new 124th.

=== 102nd Rifle Brigade ===
This was formed as one of the last of the Student (Kursant) rifle brigades in September 1942, converting the 272nd Reserve Rifle Regiment at Izhevsk with an influx of military students from the Central Asian Military District. It was informally known as an "Uzbek" unit on the basis of the nationality of most of these students, but was never officially an ethnic or "national" unit. It spent October to December in the Moscow Defence Zone training and equipping before being sent to the reserves of Leningrad Front, arriving in time to take part in Operation Iskra in January 1943, which restored land communications to the besieged city. Fighting in the second echelon of 67th Army its commander, Lt. Col. A. V. Batluk, was killed in action, and was succeeded by Col. I. S. Ugremov. Over the following months it took part in unsuccessful efforts to widen the corridor before being used to help create the 124th.

=== 138th Rifle Brigade ===
The second 138th Brigade began forming in December 1942 in 67th Army, under command of Col. M. D. Bezperstov. During Iskra it was in the Army reserves and saw little direct action in the January fighting but took part in the efforts to widen the corridor during February and March, before joining with the other brigades to form the 124th.

Once formed the division's order of battle was very similar to that of the previous formations:

- 406th Rifle Regiment
- 622nd Rifle Regiment
- 781st Rifle Regiment
- 46th Artillery Regiment
- 202nd Antitank Battalion
- 512th Antiaircraft Battalion
- 97th Reconnaissance Company
- 225th Sapper Battalion
- 200th Signal Battalion (later 710th Signal Company)
- 144th Medical/Sanitation Battalion
- 120th Chemical Defense (Anti-gas) Company
- 208th Motor Transport Company
- 364th Field Bakery
- 30th Divisional Veterinary Hospital
- 1980th Field Postal Station
- 388th Field Office of the State Bank

Col. Fyodor Fyodorovich Shishov was brought from command of the recently disbanded 123rd Rifle Brigade to lead the new division. It entered the fighting front on April 29, taking up defensive positions on the western shore of Lake Ladoga. On July 8 Shishov left the division to further his military education and was replaced by Col. Mikhail Danilovich Papchenko. This NKVD officer had previously led the 21st NKVD Rifle Division and served as acting commander when it was redesignated as the 109th Rifle Division, then moved to command of the 56th Rifle Brigade. Apart from a one-week absence in March 1945 he would remain in command for the rest of the division's existence, being promoted to major general on October 5, 1944.

=== Mga Offensives ===
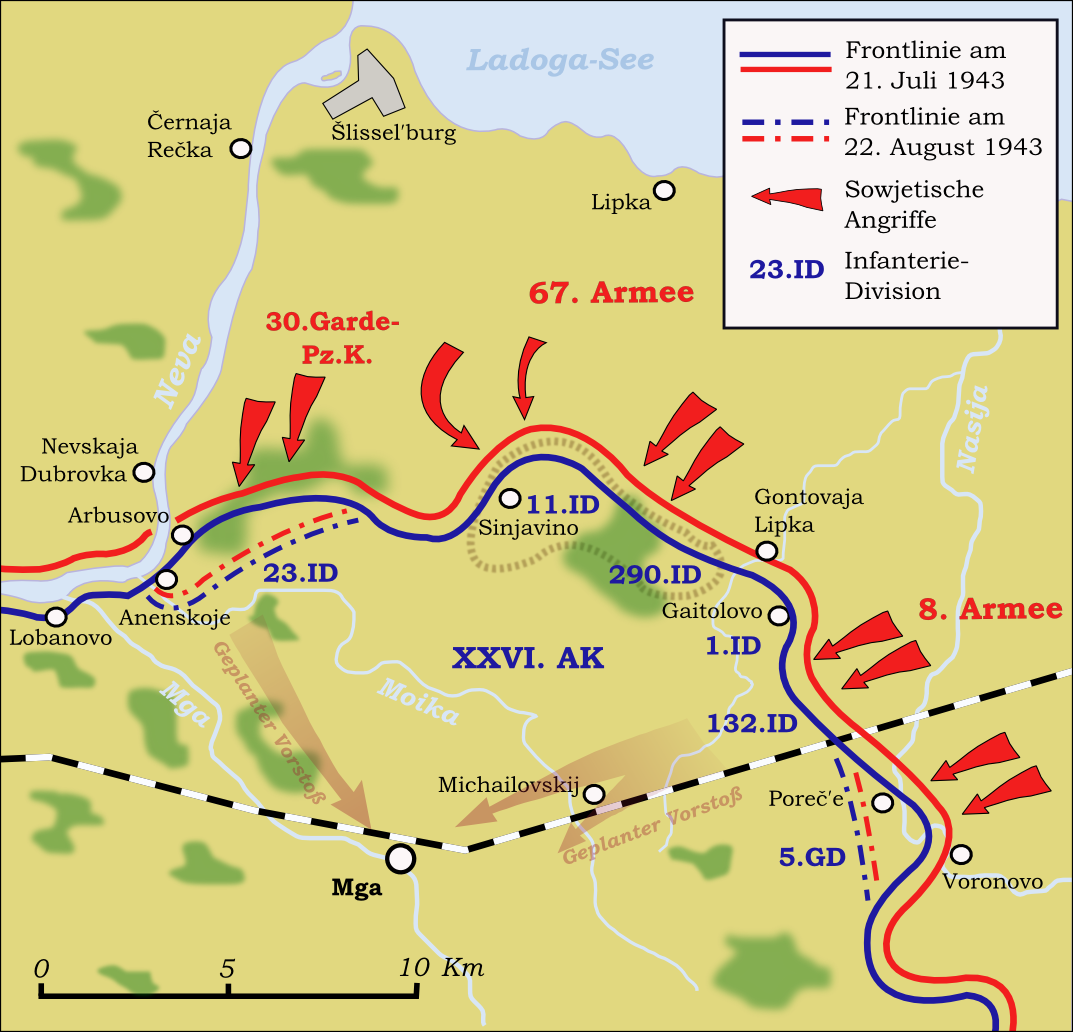
Mga (5th Sinyavino) Offensive

At the start of July 67th Army, led by Maj. Gen. M. P. Dukhanov, had the 30th Guards Rifle Corps plus six separate divisions, including the 124th, under command. After the German offensive at Kursk had been fought to a standstill the STAVKA ordered Leningrad and Volkhov Fronts to mount an offensive which would defeat German 18th Army and prevent any possibility of restoring the Leningrad blockade. This would additionally tie down German reserves to keep them from reinforcing other sectors. The mission, per the Leningrad war diary:

Monday, 12 July. Our artillery has been concentrating along the Siniavino axis since 1 July. Today it began the planned destruction of enemy engineer works and the suppression of his artillery and mortar batteries. It is as if it were an overture to the forthcoming operation whose main mission is to spoil possible enemy attempts to restore the complete blockade of Leningrad.

The two Fronts were to attack the Mga salient from three sides with the 55th, 67th, and 8th Armies. 67th Army was responsible for the center section between the Neva River and Sinyavino. If successful the German XXVI Army Corps would be destroyed and both Mga and Sinyavino would be taken. The 124th and 120th Rifle Divisions were in second echelon. By August 1 the 124th had been reassigned to 2nd Shock Army, which was in reserve behind the main front. In the event the offensive made only limited gains and was finally suspended by the STAVKA on August 22.

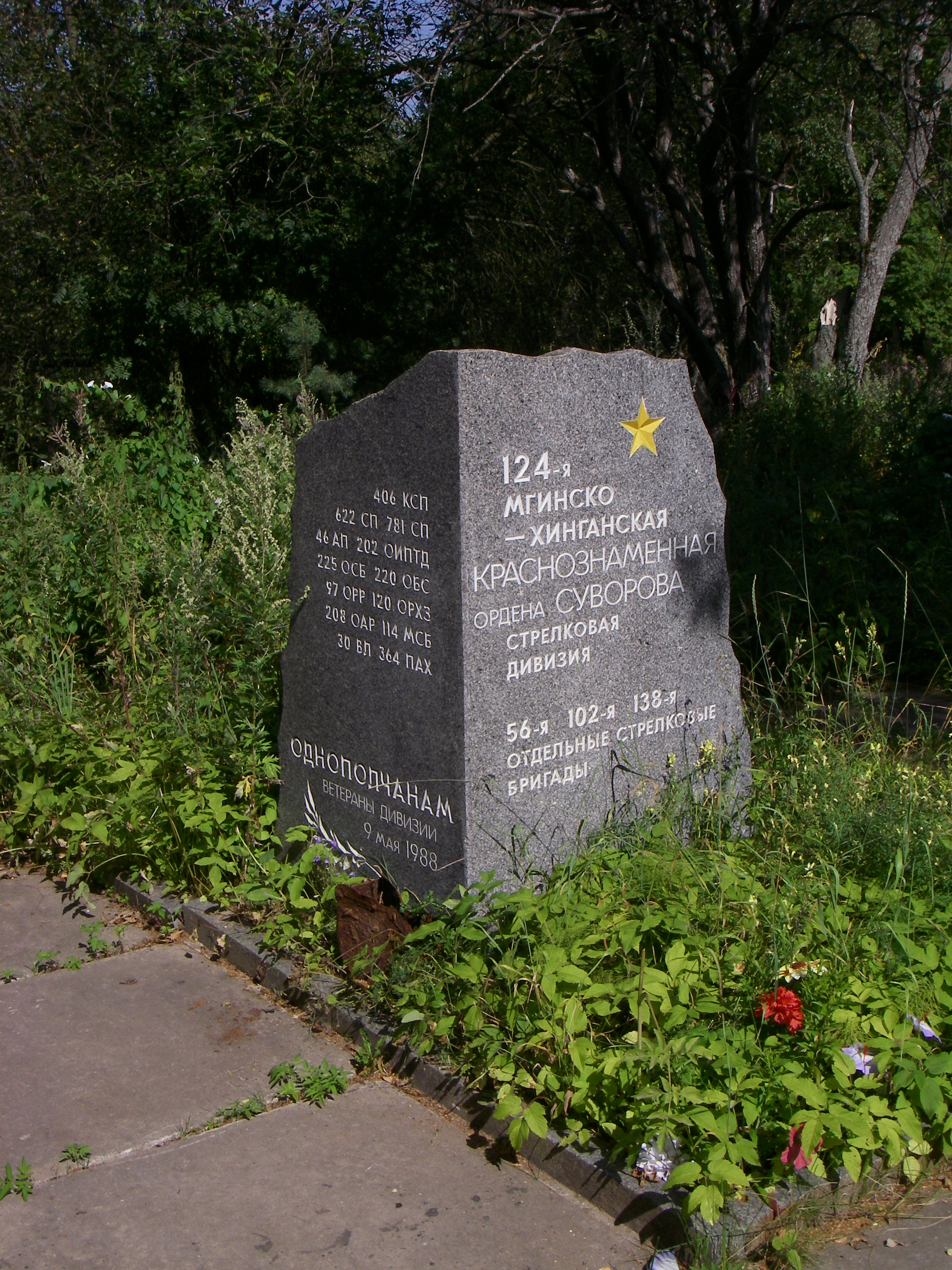
Sinyavino memorial to the 124th and the three brigades it was based on

The sixth Sinyavino offensive was set to begin on September 15. 30th Guards Corps, which had been refitting under Corps command since August, was again assigned to 67th Army and was given the task of finally storming the Sinyavino heights. The division had returned to Dukhanov's command some weeks earlier. To support the 30th Guards he formed two supporting shock groups, with the 124th, 120th, and 196th Rifle Divisions on the right (west) flank. The capture of the Heights was considered crucial to both sides as its possession allowed German artillery observation over the supply lines through the corridor. Sinyavino and its heights were being held by the 11th and 290th Infantry Divisions.

Based on past experience, the Front commander, Col. Gen. L. A. Govorov, and the Army commander both recognized that changes had to be made to the pattern of artillery support:

The battle that had occurred here previously demonstrated that, for success in the attack, it was insufficient to suppress and destroy the enemy firing points and achieve fire superiority. [Instead] it was necessary to destroy the trenches and communications trenches thoroughly to deprive the enemy of the capability for exploiting them for maneuver. One had to change the method of artillery preparation, which had become stereotypical. Usually the enemy soldiers waited through it [the preparation] in "foxes' lairs" and other shelters, and, when the fire shifted into the depth of the defense, they hurried back to the forward trenches in order to greet the attackers with organized fires.

What Govorov and his chief of artillery ordered was that the two hitherto distinct phases of the so-called artillery offensive–the artillery preparation and fires in support of the attack–be combined into a single phase. What resulted was fire that "crept" into the depth of the defense as the infantry advanced, preventing detection of the interval between phases as the preparation proceeded.

The artillery assault worked as planned, and in a 30-minute struggle the 30th Guards Corps seized the Heights that had cost so many lives. Despite this success, the flanking divisions, including the 124th, bogged down after three days of heavy fighting and the STAVKA allowed Govorov to halt the offensive on September 18. Quick reaction by German tactical reserves contained the drive before it could penetrate toward Mga in the lowlands to the south. By September 25 a period of relative calm descended over the front south of Leningrad.

== Leningrad-Novgorod Offensive ==
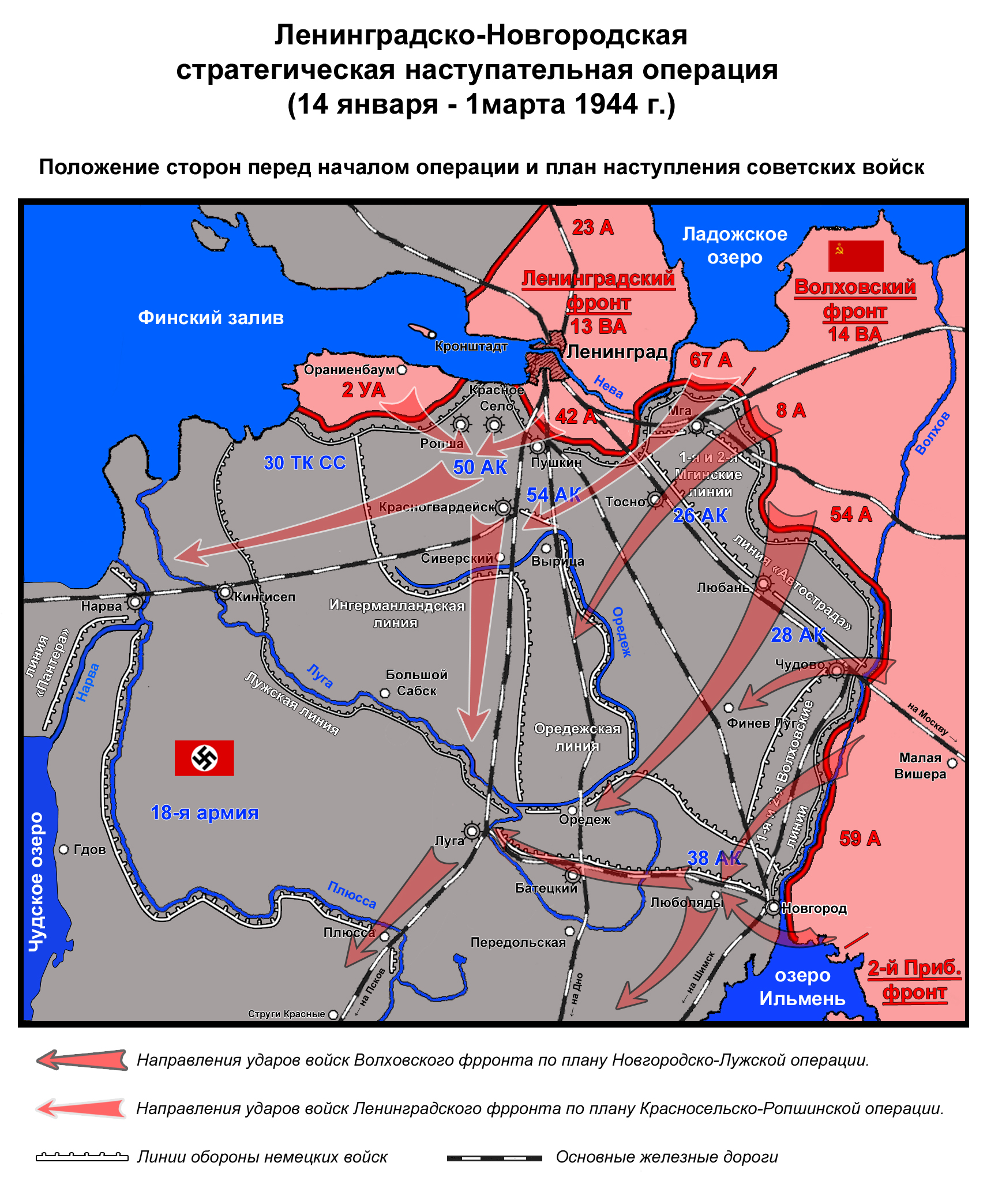
Leningrad-Novgorod Offensive. Note initial position and advance of 67th Army.

The division remained in 67th Army into January 1944, being assigned to the 118th Rifle Corps in December. The Army was now under command of Lt. Gen. V. P. Sviridov. Govorov began planning the winter offensive in early November. Initially, 67th Army was directed to pin down German forces to the east and south of Leningrad to prevent them shifting to the sectors under attack by 2nd Shock and 42nd Armies. Following this, Sviridov was to attack toward Mga and Ulyanovka in the direction of Krasnogvardeisk.

The overall offensive began on January 14. By the morning of January 18 the position of 18th Army had deteriorated to the point that its front was close to collapse and the commander of Army Group North, Col. Gen. G. von Küchler, unsuccessfully pleaded with the OKH and Hitler for permission to withdraw to the Mga River and the so-called Rollbahn Line. By evening he took the decision for himself, which was finally approved by Hitler at midnight. 67th Army began its advance on January 21 once it became known to Leningrad Front's intelligence directorate that Mga and the remaining positions near Sinyavino were being abandoned. At 1700 hours Mga was liberated, and the 124th received a battle honor:

MGA - ...124th Rifle Division (Colonel Papchenko, Mikhail Danilovich)... By order of the Supreme High Command of 21 January 1944 and a commendation in Moscow, the troops that took part in the battles to break through the enemy's defenses and liberate Mga are given a salute of 12 artillery salvoes from 124 guns.

While this hard-won success was greeted with enthusiasm by Leningraders, after-action reports criticized the commander of 118th Corps, Maj. Gen. V. K. Paramzin, for his slow reaction, stating that his forward detachments had acted "slowly and indecisively" in the pursuit.

The next day Sviridov received orders to take Tosno and clear German forces from the Rollbahn Line. By the morning of January 23 it was clear that this Line, already penetrated in several places, could not be held and the commander of 18th Army ordered his troops to evacuate Pushkin and Slutsk. This move caused Govorov to alter his plan for the general offensive, and 67th Army was directed to advance to the south and west, keeping pace with 2nd Shock and 42nd Armies on the right flank. The intention was to trap the withdrawing German forces near Luga in conjunction with Volkhov Front. Sviridov failed to take Tosno and Ulyanovka on January 24, much to the scorn of Govorov. On January 27 the STAVKA declared the siege of Leningrad officially ended, with German forces in retreat at least 65km away. The next day 118th and 110th Rifle Corps jointly captured the objectives of Vyritsa, Kaushta, and Lisino-Korpus, after which the 118th was relieved by the 14th Fortified Region and withdrawn to the Leningrad Front reserves. Army Group North was soon under command of Field Marshal W. Model; 18th Army had been reduced to just 17,000 infantrymen.

On February 1 Govorov ordered 42nd Army to push southward to the west of Luga on the right flank of 67th Army to prevent any German reinforcement of the Narva sector, currently under attack by 2nd Shock. The 118th Corps was assigned to the 42nd on February 6 to provide a second echelon. This Army was in a position to help encircle most of what remained of 18th Army in the Luga area, and an indecisive Hitler effectively permitted Model to withdraw to the Panther Line if necessary. After defeating several German counterattacks the 42nd advanced westward and its 108th Rifle Corps seized a small bridgehead across the narrows between Lakes Peipus and Pskov. Luga was finally abandoned on February 12 with 67th Army in pursuit as Model ordered 18th Army back to the Panther line by March 1. By that date the 124th had left 118th Corps and was back in the reserves of Leningrad Front. On March 22 the division was recognized for its success in the campaign with the award of the Order of the Red Banner. The 406th Rifle Regiment received the same decoration in the same decree. At about the same time the division was transferred to the 43rd Rifle Corps in 8th Army, still in Leningrad Front.

=== Battle of Narva ===
After months of fighting Leningrad Front went over to the defense on the Luga sector on April 12. 8th Army had taken over the Auvere bridgehead from 2nd Shock but on April 19 the III SS Panzer Corps and LIV Army Corps launched Operation Narva following a 30-minute artillery preparation, in an effort to retake it. While the Army commander, Lt. Gen. F. N. Starikov, claimed to have beaten back 17 separate attacks on this first day, in the five days of fighting that followed his forces were pushed out of a sector from Auvere Station to Vanamyiza. Govorov was sufficiently impressed that he began construction of a new reserve line, and suspended operations in the Narva sector until July. By the start of May the 124th had returned to 2nd Shock, first serving in 109th Rifle Corps and, a month later, in 124th Rifle Corps. In June it returned to 43rd Corps, under direct Front command, and began moving toward Karelia.

== Vyborg–Petrozavodsk Offensive ==
On June 30 the 124th was transferred, with its Corps, to 59th Army, still in Leningrad Front. At this time the STAVKA was determined to settle affairs with Finland, and while the main offensive on the Karelian Isthmus would be launched by 21st and 23rd Armies, the 59th, with three divisions, would conduct amphibious operations along the Finnish coast.

=== Battle of Vyborg Bay ===
The offensive had begun on June 10 and ten days later the combined 21st and 23rd Armies occupied the city of Vyborg (Viipuri). The Baltic Fleet had been assigned to support the former in its advance on the west side of the Karelian Isthmus. Part of this support consisted of conducting genuine and feint amphibious assaults to tie down Finnish forces, using elements of 43rd Corps. Following the occupation of Vyborg the two Armies expected to smash through the Finnish defenses to the north and northeast and advance to the prewar Soviet-Finnish border and the seaborne attack was intended to assist this by capturing the islands in Vyborg Bay before landing on the Finnish mainland on the Bay's north shore to outflank the Finnish lines. The Finns had already erected defenses along this coast in expectation of an assault and these were manned by the 2nd Coastal Brigade and elements of V Army Corps. The islands were held by the reinforced 1st Cavalry Brigade. In addition to other Finnish forces on the mainland the German 122nd Infantry Division was in reserve in the Siakkiiarvi region. According to Soviet intelligence the 1st Cavalry and 2nd Coastal Brigades had 31 artillery and mortar batteries with 130 guns and mortars of 75mm-210mm calibre.

The Baltic Fleet force consisted of 84 cutters and 30 amphibious tenders plus a division of torpedo boats. The assault was set to start at first light on July 4. The 244th Rifle Division attacked Teikar-saari, Suonion-saari and Ravan-saari with three regiments backed by considerable artillery and other assets. While the latter fell quickly, the division ran into a stubborn defense at the first two islands. Meanwhile the 124th occupied Melan-sari, and at midnight on July 4/5 the Army commander, Lt. Gen. I. T. Korovnikov, ordered General Papchenko to send two battalions and four tanks to Teikar-sari, where the 160th Rifle Regiment had been driven to the southern tip by Finnish reinforcements and had lost communications with the mainland. The island was secured by 2100 hours. The fall of the islands prompted the Finnish command to shore up its coastal defenses southwest of Vyborg. Meanwhile, Marshal Govorov ordered the Baltic Fleet to prepare another amphibious assault along this coast on July 12 with the three divisions of 43rd Corps. This was cancelled when his renewed offensive on the mainland failed and on July 14 the 59th Army was ordered to go over to the defense.

== Into East Prussia ==
The 124th remained near Finland under its Army and Corps commands until September 30 when it was moved to the Reserve of the Supreme High Command, assigned to 21st Army's 94th Rifle Corps. It would remain under this Corps command into the postwar. It returned to the fighting front during November 7-30 as part of 3rd Belorussian Front near the border of East Prussia, but returned to the Reserve until December 5, when it was assigned to 39th Army of the same Front.

At the outset of the final offensive into Germany on January 12, 1945, the Corps consisted of the 124th, 221st, and 358th Rifle Divisions. In the plan for the offensive 39th Army was on the right flank of 3rd Belorussian Front, south of the Neman River. 94th Rifle Corps was in the first echelon with 5th Guards Rifle Corps, facing a breakthrough sector 8km wide, with the immediate objective of destroying the enemy forces in the Pilkallen area, before advancing westward and capturing Tilsit by the end of the fifth day. The 124th was in the Corps second echelon. The offensive began on schedule and made immediate progress. However, on January 14 German forces launched heavy counterattacks along the front while the Soviet advance ran into deeply echeloned defenses. 39th Army beat off as many as 15 such attacks by up to a battalion in strength, backed by 8-16 tanks apiece. The 124th was committed into battle from behind the 358th's right flank, broke into Pilkallen and seized the railroad station, the only significant advance of the day.

In the fighting for Pillkalen two men of the 781st Rifle Regiment distinguished themselves and were posthumously made Heroes of the Soviet Union. Cpl. Ivan Ilych Kornev took over command of his company from its wounded commander and, at its head, was one of the first Soviet soldiers to break into the town. He was killed in later fighting. Lt. Alexei Ivanovich Tazaev was in command of a platoon which he led into a group of buildings on the outskirts. He successfully defended these against counterattacks for two days despite serious wounds, but finally succumbed on January 17. Both were buried in Pillkalen, now Dobrovolsk. On April 19 both were officially awarded the Gold Star.

The Army commander, Lt. Gen. I. I. Lyudnikov, ordered the Corps to speed up its attack on the morning of January 18, in the general direction of Raudonatchen. By this time it was clear that 39th Army was making the best progress among the armies of the Front, and the 1st Tank Corps was moved in to exploit. In its wake, the 94th Corps reached the line of the Inster River near Raudonatchen, advancing as much as 20km. This advance prepared the way for elements of 43rd Army to break into Tilsit in the afternoon of January 19, while the 94th Corps advanced to the Tilsit-Insterburg railroad. On January 22 the 124th was on the march and had passed through Kirschnabeck, while 39th Army overall reached the Curonian Lagoon along the line of the Deime River, splitting the German defense. After hard fighting over the next day this river line was forced, and the way was open to Königsberg. In recognition of its role in penetrating the defenses of East Prussia the division would be awarded the Order of Suvorov, 2nd Degree, on February 19.

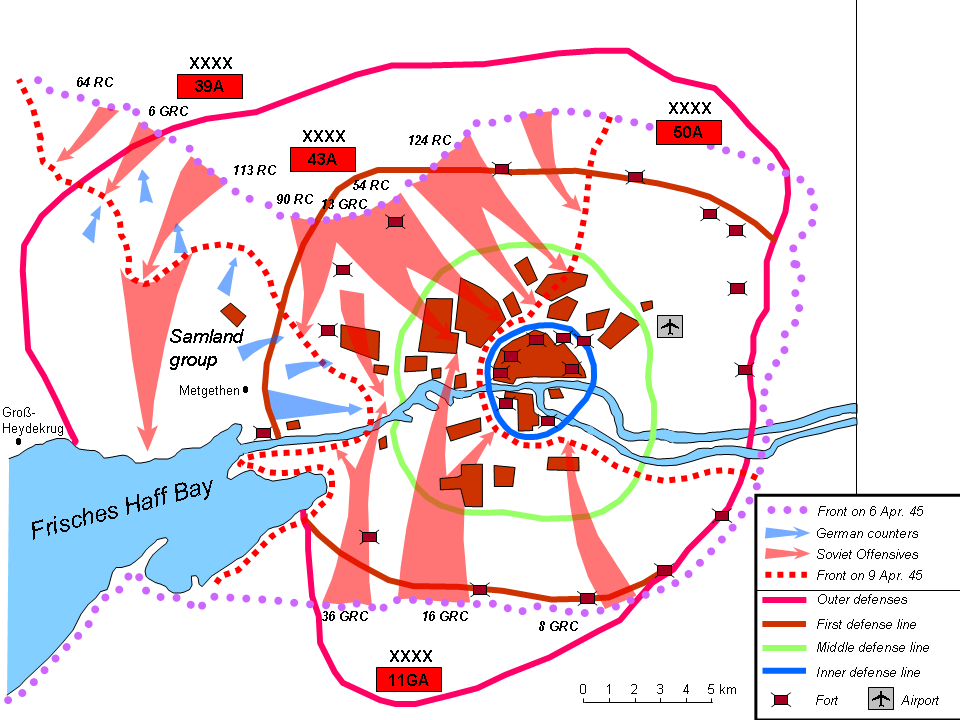
Battle Of Königsberg. Note the 94th Rifle Corps is misidentified as the 64th.

The right-flank armies of 3rd Belorussian Front were tasked with capturing the city, and on January 27 they had reached its outskirts. 94th Corps, in the Schoenwalde area, was counterattacked twice, with heavy artillery support. Despite this, it broke through the fortified defenses north of the Alter Pregel River, took the strongpoints of Gamsau and Praddau, and on the following day reached the fortifications of the city itself, becoming involved in stubborn fighting. And here the sector in the Samland Peninsula west of Königsberg remained static until early April.

On February 9 the 39th Army was transferred to 1st Baltic Front, which was redesignated as the Zemland Group of Forces on February 24, returning to 3rd Belorussian Front. On March 18 General Papchenko was hospitalized due to illness, being replaced by Col. Rafail Aronovich Barmash, but returned to service on March 28.

=== Battle of Königsberg ===
When the final assault began on April 6 the 94th Corps had two divisions in the first echelon and one in the second, plus considerable reinforcements. By the end of the day 39th Army advanced up to 4km, despite counterattacks by 5th Panzer Division from the west. During the next day the Army was counterattacked 18 times, slowing its advance. By the end of April 9 the German garrison capitulated, while 39th Army was regrouping for subsequent operations into the western part of the Samland Peninsula.

== Soviet invasion of Manchuria ==
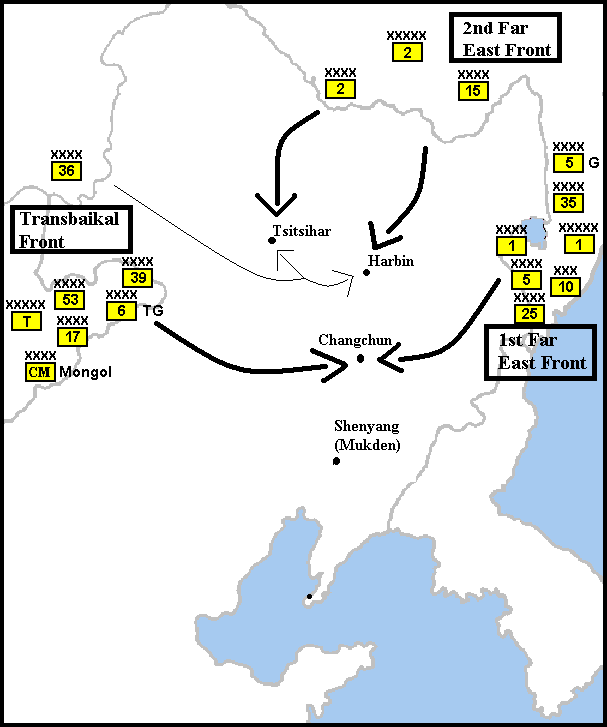
Invasion of Manchuria. Note position of 39th Army.

39th Army was chosen for the invasion of Japanese-held Manchuria in large part due to its experience in East Prussia; the Japanese frontier was known to be heavily fortified. It entered the Reserve of the Supreme High Command on April 30 and soon began shipping eastwards; by July 1 it was in the Transbaikal Front.

In the plan for the offensive, the 39th was on the Front's left flank, and was facing the Greater Khingan mountains. The operation began on August 9 and the 94th Corps advanced toward Hailar from the south. The 124th was positioned at a gap along the border between its own Corps and the 5th Guards Corps, preparing to assault Japanese forces in the Halung-Arshaam Fortified Region, consisting of two regiments of the 107th Infantry Division. Papchenko conducted a reconnaissance-in-force while his main body made ready to attack the next day. The other forward detachments of the Army bypassed these fortifications on the first day and gained up to 60km, although the infantry lagged behind the tanks. On August 10 the neighboring 36th Army soon scored a significant success against the Japanese forces at Hailar, prompting General Lyudnikov to redirect the 358th and 221st Divisions southward to link up with the 124th Division in its battle at Halung-Arshaam. This fighting continued into August 13, and during that night and the following morning the Japanese forces were scattered, caught between the 124th and the 19th Guards Rifle Division. The main forces of 39th Army began moving by rail to the Liaodong Peninsula on August 17 while 94th Corps remained engaged in the reduction of the last enemy positions in the Wangyemiao area. The main offensive ended with the Japanese capitulation on August 20, but remnants of the 107th continued to resist until near the end of the month. The division commander, along with his remaining 7,858 men, finally capitulated to the 221st on August 30 at Chalai, southwest of Qiqihar.

== Postwar ==
On September 20 the division was given credit for its performance by receiving the name of the Khingan range as its second honorific, making its final full title 124th Rifle, Mga-Khingan, Order of the Red Banner, Order of Suvorov Division (Russian: 124-я стрелковая Мгинско-Хинганская Краснознамённая ордена Суворова дивизия). At about this time the division was transferred with 94th Corps to 53rd Army, still in Transbaikal Front. It was disbanded in October–November at Kharanor station along with its Corps and the 53rd Army. Papchenko would go on to command the famous 8th Guards Rifle Division during 1947-49, before leading the 12th Mountain Rifle Corps up to his retirement in November 1953.
