= Krinichnoye, Voronezh Oblast =

Krinichnoye Криничное
- Selo
- Location within Voronezh Oblast Location within Russia
- Coordinates: 50°00′N 39°50′E
- Country: Russia
- Region: Voronezh Oblast
- District: Rossoshansky District
- Time zone: UTC+3:00

Krinichnoye (Russian: Криничное) is a rural locality (a selo) and the administrative center of Krinichanskoye Rural Settlement, Rossoshansky District, Voronezh Oblast, Russia. The population was 606 as of 2010. There are 8 streets.

== Geography ==
Krinichnoye is located 43 km southeast of Rossosh (the district's administrative centre) by road. Grigoryevka is the nearest rural locality.
