= Pervomayskoye, Rossoshansky District, Voronezh Oblast =

Pervomayskoye Первомайское
- Selo
- Location within Voronezh Oblast Location within Russia
- Coordinates: 49°57′N 39°57′E
- Country: Russia
- Region: Voronezh Oblast
- District: Rossoshansky District
- Time zone: UTC+3:00

Pervomayskoye (Russian: Первомайское) is a rural locality (a selo) in Krinichanskoye Rural Settlement, Rossoshansky District, Voronezh Oblast, Russia. The population was 462 as of 2010. There are 14 streets.

== Geography ==
Pervomayskoye is located 54 km northeast of Rossosh (the district's administrative centre) by road. Ivanovka is the nearest rural locality.
