= Novosyolovka, Voronezh Oblast =

Novosyolovka Новосёловка
- Khutor
- Location within Voronezh Oblast Location within Russia
- Coordinates: 50°04′N 39°21′E
- Country: Russia
- Region: Voronezh Oblast
- District: Rossoshansky District
- Time zone: UTC+3:00

Novosyolovka (Russian: Новосёловка) is a rural locality (a khutor) in Shekalovskoye Rural Settlement, Rossoshansky District, Voronezh Oblast, Russia. The population was 82 as of 2010.

== Geography ==
Novosyolovka is located 32 km southwest of Rossosh (the district's administrative centre) by road. Shekalovka is the nearest rural locality.
