= Golubaya Krinitsa =

Golubaya Krinitsa Голубая Криница
- Khutor
- Location within Voronezh Oblast Location within Russia
- Coordinates: 50°04′N 39°53′E
- Country: Russia
- Region: Voronezh Oblast
- District: Rossoshansky District
- Time zone: UTC+3:00

Golubaya Krinitsa (Russian: Голубая Криница) is a rural locality (a khutor) in Novokalitvenskoye Rural Settlement, Rossoshansky District, Voronezh Oblast, Russia. The population was 138 as of 2010. There are 2 streets.

== Geography ==
Golubaya Krinitsa is located 53 km southeast of Rossosh (the district's administrative centre) by road. Novaya Kalitva is the nearest rural locality.
