= Raynovskoye =

Raynovskoye Райновское
- Settlement
- Location within Voronezh Oblast Location within Russia
- Coordinates: 50°03′N 39°39′E
- Country: Russia
- Region: Voronezh Oblast
- District: Rossoshansky District
- Time zone: UTC+3:00

Raynovskoye (Russian: Райновское) is a rural locality (a settlement) in Kopenkinskoye Rural Settlement, Rossoshansky District, Voronezh Oblast, Russia. The population was 212 as of 2010. There are 4 streets.

== Geography ==
Raynovskoye is located 28 km south of Rossosh (the district's administrative centre) by road. Voroshilovsky is the nearest rural locality.
