= Nachalo, Voronezh Oblast =

Nachalo Начало
- Settlement
- Location within Voronezh Oblast Location within Russia
- Coordinates: 50°13′N 39°34′E
- Country: Russia
- Region: Voronezh Oblast
- District: Rossoshansky District
- Time zone: UTC+3:00

Nachalo (Russian: Начало) is a rural locality (a settlement) and the administrative center of Novopostoyalovskoye Rural Settlement, Rossoshansky District, Voronezh Oblast, Russia. The population was 1,832 as of 2010. There are 33 streets.

== Geography ==
Nachalo is located 6 km north of Rossosh (the district's administrative centre) by road. Rossosh is the nearest rural locality.
