= Kokarevka =

Kokarevka Кокаревка
- Khutor
- Location within Voronezh Oblast Location within Russia
- Coordinates: 50°15′N 39°35′E
- Country: Russia
- Region: Voronezh Oblast
- District: Rossoshansky District
- Time zone: UTC+3:00

Kokarevka (Russian: Кокаревка) is a rural locality (a khutor) in Novopostoyalovskoye Rural Settlement, Rossoshansky District, Voronezh Oblast, Russia. The population was 415 as of 2010. There are 7 streets.

== Geography ==
Kokarevka is located 10 km north of Rossosh (the district's administrative centre) by road. Nachalo is the nearest rural locality.
