= Pereshchepnoye, Rossoshansky District, Voronezh Oblast =

Pereshchepnoye Перещепное
- Khutor
- Location within Voronezh Oblast Location within Russia
- Coordinates: 50°01′N 39°33′E
- Country: Russia
- Region: Voronezh Oblast
- District: Rossoshansky District
- Time zone: UTC+3:00

Pereshchepnoye (Russian: Перещепное) is a rural locality (a khutor) in Kopenkinskoye Rural Settlement, Rossoshansky District, Voronezh Oblast, Russia. The population was 96 as of 2010. There are 2 streets.

== Geography ==
Pereshchepnoye is located 27 km south of Rossosh (the district's administrative centre) by road. Kopenkina is the nearest rural locality.
