= Verkhny Kiev =

Verkhny Kiev Верхний Киев
- Khutor
- Location within Voronezh Oblast Location within Russia
- Coordinates: 50°15′N 39°46′E
- Country: Russia
- Region: Voronezh Oblast
- District: Rossoshansky District
- Time zone: UTC+3:00

Verkhny Kiev (Russian: Верхний Киев) is a rural locality (a khutor) in Aleynikovskoye Rural Settlement, Rossoshansky District, Voronezh Oblast, Russia. The population was 53 as of 2010. There are 2 streets.

== Geography ==
Verkhny Kiev is located 18 km northeast of Rossosh (the district's administrative centre) by road. Vodyanoye is the nearest rural locality.
