= Nikonorovka =

Nikonorovka Никоноровка
- Khutor
- Location within Voronezh Oblast Location within Russia
- Coordinates: 50°13′N 39°47′E
- Country: Russia
- Region: Voronezh Oblast
- District: Rossoshansky District
- Time zone: UTC+3:00

Nikonorovka (Russian: Никоноровка) is a rural locality (a khutor) in Aleynikovskoye Rural Settlement, Rossoshansky District, Voronezh Oblast, Russia. The population was 59 as of 2010.

== Geography ==
Nikonorovka is located 23 km northeast of Rossosh (the district's administrative centre) by road. Ilovka is the nearest rural locality.
