= Arkhangelsk, Voronezh Oblast =

Arkhangelsk Архангельск
- Khutor
- Location within Voronezh Oblast Location within Russia
- Coordinates: 50°17′N 39°52′E
- Country: Russia
- Region: Voronezh Oblast
- District: Rossoshansky District
- Time zone: UTC+3:00

Arkhangelsk (Russian: Архангельск) is a rural locality (a khutor) in Aleynikovskoye Rural Settlement, Rossoshansky District, Voronezh Oblast, Russia. The population was 72 as of 2010. There are 2 streets.

== Geography ==
Arkhangelsk is located 29 km northeast of Rossosh (the district's administrative centre) by road. Kirov is the nearest rural locality.
