= Kolbinka =

Kolbinka Колбинка
- Selo
- Location within Voronezh Oblast Location within Russia
- Coordinates: 50°06′N 39°43′E
- Country: Russia
- Region: Voronezh Oblast
- District: Rossoshansky District
- Time zone: UTC+3:00

Kolbinka (Russian: Колбинка) is a rural locality (a selo) in Morozovskoye Rural Settlement, Rossoshansky District, Voronezh Oblast, Russia. The population was 63 as of 2010. There are 3 streets.

== Geography ==
Kolbinka is located 22 km southeast of Rossosh (the district's administrative centre) by road. Yevstratovka is the nearest rural locality.
