= Khersonsky =

Khersonsky Херсонский
- Khutor
- Location within Voronezh Oblast Location within Russia
- Coordinates: 50°12′N 39°36′E
- Country: Russia
- Region: Voronezh Oblast
- District: Rossoshansky District
- Time zone: UTC+3:00

Khersonsky (Russian: Херсонский) is a rural locality (a khutor) in Novopostoyalovskoye Rural Settlement, Rossoshansky District, Voronezh Oblast, Russia. The population was 115 as of 2010. There are 2 streets.

== Geography ==
Khersonsky is located 5 km northeast of Rossosh (the district's administrative centre) by road. Sobachy is the nearest rural locality.
