= Loshchina =

Loshchina Лощина
- Selo
- Location within Voronezh Oblast Location within Russia
- Coordinates: 50°08′N 39°53′E
- Country: Russia
- Region: Voronezh Oblast
- District: Rossoshansky District
- Time zone: UTC+3:00

Loshchina (Russian: Лощина) is a rural locality (a selo) in Starokalitvenskoye Rural Settlement, Rossoshansky District, Voronezh Oblast, Russia. The population was 451 as of 2010. There are 7 streets.

== Geography ==
Loshchina is located 27 km southeast of Rossosh (the district's administrative centre) by road. Ternovka is the nearest rural locality.
