= Antselovich =

Antselovich Анцелович
- Selo
- Location within Voronezh Oblast Location within Russia
- Coordinates: 50°08′N 39°35′E
- Country: Russia
- Region: Voronezh Oblast
- District: Rossoshansky District
- Time zone: UTC+3:00

Antselovich (Russian: Анцелович) is a rural locality (a selo) in Morozovskoye Rural Settlement, Rossoshansky District, Voronezh Oblast, Russia. The population was 462 as of 2010. There are 3 streets.

== Geography ==
Antselovich is located 14 km south of Rossosh (the district's administrative centre) by road. Morozovka is the nearest rural locality.
