= Stetsenkovo =

Stetsenkovo Стеценково
- Selo
- Location within Voronezh Oblast Location within Russia
- Coordinates: 49°57′N 40°07′E
- Country: Russia
- Region: Voronezh Oblast
- District: Rossoshansky District
- Time zone: UTC+3:00

Stetsenkovo (Russian: Стеценково) is a rural locality (a selo) in Novokalitvenskoye Rural Settlement, Rossoshansky District, Voronezh Oblast, Russia. The population was 217 as of 2010. There are 7 streets.

== Geography ==
Stetsenkovo is located 60 km southeast of Rossosh (the district's administrative centre) by road. Ivanovka is the nearest rural locality.
