= Krivonosovo =

Krivonosovo Кривоносово
- Selo
- Location within Voronezh Oblast Location within Russia
- Coordinates: 49°54′N 39°15′E
- Country: Russia
- Region: Voronezh Oblast
- District: Rossoshansky District
- Time zone: UTC+3:00

Krivonosovo (Russian: Кривоносово) is a rural locality (a selo) and the administrative center of Krivonosovskoye Rural Settlement, Rossoshansky District, Voronezh Oblast, Russia. The population was 988 as of 2010. There are 9 streets.

== Geography ==
Krivonosovo is located 49 km southeast of Rossosh (the district's administrative centre) by road. Zhilino is the nearest rural locality.
