= Shramovka =

Shramovka Шрамовка
- Selo
- Location within Voronezh Oblast Location within Russia
- Coordinates: 49°55′N 39°34′E
- Country: Russia
- Region: Voronezh Oblast
- District: Rossoshansky District
- Time zone: UTC+3:00

Shramovka (Russian: Шрамовка) is a rural locality (a selo) and the administrative center of Shramovskoye Rural Settlement, Rossoshansky District, Voronezh Oblast, Russia. The population was 416 as of 2010. There are 7 streets.

== Geography ==
Shramovka is located 44 km south of Rossosh (the district's administrative centre) by road. Sofiyevka is the nearest rural locality.
