= Tsapkovo =

Tsapkovo Цапково
- Selo
- Location within Voronezh Oblast Location within Russia
- Coordinates: 50°01′N 40°09′E
- Country: Russia
- Region: Voronezh Oblast
- District: Rossoshansky District
- Time zone: UTC+3:00

Tsapkovo (Russian: Цапково) is a rural locality (a selo) in Novokalitvenskoye Rural Settlement, Rossoshansky District, Voronezh Oblast, Russia. The population was 192 as of 2010. There are 11 streets.

== Geography ==
Tsapkovo is located 58 km southeast of Rossosh (the district's administrative centre) by road. Ivanovka is the nearest rural locality.
