= Grigoryevka, Rossoshansky District, Voronezh Oblast =

Grigoryevka Григорьевка
- Khutor
- Location within Voronezh Oblast Location within Russia
- Coordinates: 50°01′N 39°49′E
- Country: Russia
- Region: Voronezh Oblast
- District: Rossoshansky District
- Time zone: UTC+3:00

Grigoryevka (Russian: Григорьевка) is a rural locality (a khutor) in Krinichanskoye Rural Settlement, Rossoshansky District, Voronezh Oblast, Russia. The population was 228 as of 2010. There are 2 streets.

== Geography ==
Grigoryevka is located 41 km southeast of Rossosh (the district's administrative centre) by road. Krinichnoye is the nearest rural locality.
