= Artyomovo, Voronezh Oblast =

Artyomovo Артёмово
- Khutor
- Location within Voronezh Oblast Location within Russia
- Coordinates: 50°09′N 39°33′E
- Country: Russia
- Region: Voronezh Oblast
- District: Rossoshansky District
- Time zone: UTC+3:00

Artyomovo (Russian: Артёмово) is a rural locality (a khutor) in Lizinovskoye Rural Settlement, Rossoshansky District, Voronezh Oblast, Russia. The population was 90 as of 2010.

== Geography ==
Artyomovo is located 11 km southwest of Rossosh (the district's administrative centre) by road. Chernyshovka is the nearest rural locality.
