= Steppe Military District =

Military district of the Soviet Union

- Active: April–July 1943; July 1945 – May 1946
- Country: Soviet Union
- Type: Military district
- Headquarters: Voronezh (1st formation); Alma-Ata (2nd formation)

Commanders
- Notable commanders: Ivan Konev; Markian Popov

The Steppe Military District (Russian: Степной военный округ (СВО), romanized: Stepnoy voyennyy okrug (SVO)) was a military district of the Soviet Union, formed twice. It was first formed in April 1943 during World War II near Voronezh as a strategic reserve, and after the beginning of the Battle of Kursk in July it became the Steppe Front. Postwar, the district was formed for a second time in Kazakhstan in July 1945 and demobilised troops among other duties before being disbanded in May 1946.

== First formation ==
The Steppe Military District was first formed during World War II on 15 April 1943 in accordance with a Stavka directive of 13 April by the renaming of the Reserve Front, which had been formed from the 41st Army headquarters shortly before. The district served as a strategic reserve for Stavka, and its headquarters was organised on tables of organisation and equipment for a field front command. It was initially commanded and organised by Lieutenant General (later Colonel General) Markian Popov. The district headquarters was located near Voronezh in the villages of Somovo, Novaya Usman, Babilovo, Rykan, Khrenovoye, and others at various points in time. It initially included the 24th (redesignated the 4th Guards Army on 16 April), 46th, 47th, 53rd, 66th (redesignated the 5th Guards Army on 5 May), 5th Guards Tank, and 5th Air Armies, as well as separate units completing their formation.

Its troops were stationed in Voronezh, Kursk, Tambov, and Rostov Oblasts. The district was tasked with preventing a German breakthrough from Oryol and Belgorod towards Kursk and Voronezh, and to this end a 250-kilometre (160 mi) defensive line along the Kshen River from Rossoshnoye to Bely Kholodez was established and preparations made for counterattacking and going on the offensive towards Maloarkhangelsk, Kursk, and Oboyan. On 25 May the 27th Army joined the district. The movement of the 27th and 53rd Armies to the district from the Northwestern Front to the area east of Kursk and the movement of the 46th and 47th Armies from the North Caucasus Front to the area east of Kharkov went undetected by German intelligence. The district's troops strengthened defences and received reinforcements and equipment. In June Colonel General Ivan Konev took command of the district, on the recommendation of Stavka representative Georgy Zhukov.

When the German offensive Operation Citadel in the Battle of Kursk began on 5 July, the 27th Army defended the Kshen line on the left from Rossoshnoye to Nikolskoye, the 53rd Army in the center to Bezlepkino, and the 5th Guards Army on the right to Bely Kolodez. The 47th Army was concentrated in the area of Olkhovatka, Krivonosovka, and Kamenka, while the 4th Guards Tank Corps was in the area of Beduga Station and the 10th Tank Corps near Stary Oskol. The district's main armored striking force, the 5th Guards Tank Army, included the 29th Tank Corps in the forests west of Ostrogozhsk, the 5th Guards Mechanised Corps in the Kamenka area, and the 3rd Guards Mechanised Corps in the area of Kuzmenkov. The Steppe Military District also included three cavalry corps: the 7th Guards in the area of Belogorye and Pavlovsk, the 3rd Guards in the area of Staraya Kalitva and Novaya Kalitva, and the 5th Guards in the area of Novo-Markovka, Kirovo, and Nikolskoye.

On the morning of 7 July, the 5th Guards Tank Army began its march to the front to fight at Kursk. On the same day the 10th Tank Corps transferred to the Voronezh Front and began moving to the front. On the night of 8 July, the 47th Army was shifted forward to the area of Khmelevoye and Korocha, closer to the action. On 9 July, the district became the Steppe Front.

== Second formation ==
The Steppe Military District was formed for a second time postwar when the territory of the Central Asian Military District was divided between the Steppe and Turkestan Military Districts on 9 July 1945. The district headquarters was formed from the 4th Shock Army headquarters at Alma-Ata, and its only commander was former Central Asian Military District commander Lieutenant General Pavel Kurbatkin. It controlled troops on the territory of the Kazakh Soviet Socialist Republic, excluding Aktobe, Guryev, and West Kazakhstan Oblasts. The district disbanded reserve and training units and demobilised combat units withdrawn to the district. On 4 February 1946 it became a territorial military district and was subordinated to the Turkestan Military District. Its headquarters was disbanded on 3 May.

== Commanders ==
The following officers commanded the district's first formation:

- Lieutenant General (promoted to Colonel General in April) Markian Popov (April – June 1943)
- Colonel General Max Reyter (June 1943)
- Colonel General Ivan Konev (June – July 1943)

The following officer commanded the district's second formation:

- Lieutenant General Pavel Kurbatkin (July 1945 – May 1946)
