= Staraya Kalitva =

Staraya Kalitva Старая Калитва
- Selo
- Location within Voronezh Oblast Location within Russia
- Coordinates: 50°08′N 39°59′E
- Country: Russia
- Region: Voronezh Oblast
- District: Rossoshansky District
- Time zone: UTC+3:00

Staraya Kalitva (Russian: Старая Калитва) is a rural locality (a selo) and the administrative center of Starokalitvenskoye Rural Settlement, Rossoshansky District, Voronezh Oblast, Russia. The population was 1,439 as of 2010. There are 28 streets.

== Geography ==
Staraya Kalitva is located on the right bank of the Don River, 35 km east of Rossosh (the district's administrative centre) by road. Novaya Kalitva is the nearest rural locality.
