= Melokletsky =

Melokletsky Мелоклетский
- Khutor
- Location within Volgograd Oblast Location within Russia
- Coordinates: 49°18′N 43°07′E
- Country: Russia
- Region: Volgograd Oblast
- District: Kletsky District
- Time zone: UTC+4:00

Melokletsky (Russian: Мелоклетский) is a rural locality (a khutor) in Kletskoye Rural Settlement, Kletsky District, Volgograd Oblast, Russia. The population was 232 as of 2010. There are 2 streets.

== Geography ==
Melokletsky is located on the Don River, 7 km southeast of Kletskaya (the district's administrative centre) by road. Kletskaya is the nearest rural locality.
