= Artyomovo, Vladimir Oblast =

Artyomovo Артёмово
- Village
- Location within Vladimir Oblast Location within Russia
- Coordinates: 56°29′N 41°27′E
- Country: Russia
- Region: Vladimir Oblast
- District: Kovrovsky District
- Time zone: UTC+3:00

Artyomovo (Russian: Артёмово) is a rural locality (a village) Malyginskoye Rural Settlement, Kovrovsky District, Vladimir Oblast, Russia. The population was 2 as of 2010.

== Geography ==
Artyomovo is located 27 km northeast of Kovrov (the district's administrative centre) by road. Ilyino is the nearest rural locality.
