= Rossosh, Rossoshansky District, Voronezh Oblast =

Town in Voronezh Oblast, Russia

Rossosh Россошь
- Town
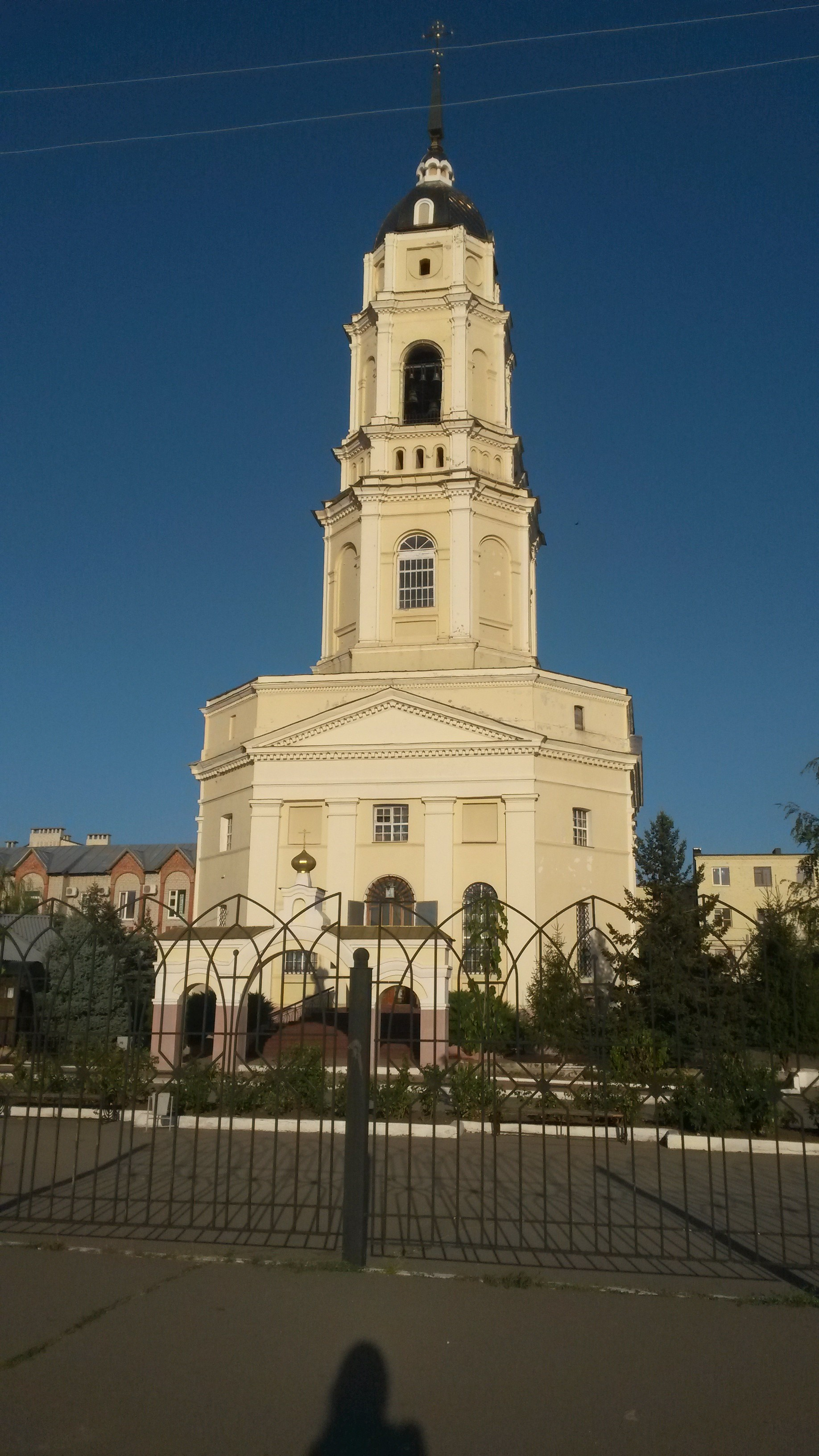

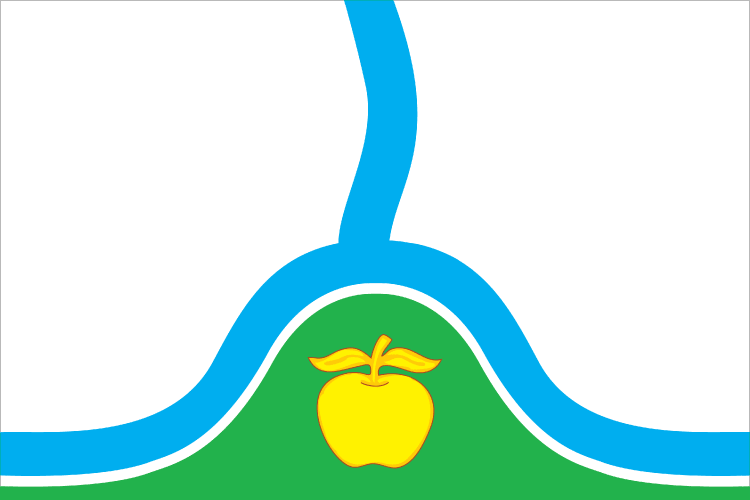
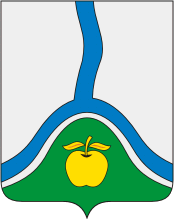
- Flag Coat of arms
- Interactive map of Rossosh
- Location of Rossosh Rossosh (Voronezh Oblast)
- Coordinates: 50°12′N 39°33′E
- Country: Russia
- Federal subject: Voronezh Oblast
- Administrative district: Rossoshansky District
- Urban settlementSelsoviet: Rossosh
- Founded: 17th century
- Elevation: 85 m (279 ft)

Population (2010 Census)
  - Total: 62,865
  - Estimate (2025): 59,568 (−5.2%)
  - Rank: 251st in 2010

Administrative status
  - Capital of: Rossoshansky District, Rossosh Urban Settlement

Municipal status
  - Municipal district: Rossoshansky Municipal District
  - Urban settlement: Rossosh Urban Settlement
  - Capital of: Rossoshansky Municipal District, Rossosh Urban Settlement
- Time zone: UTC+3 (MSK)
- Postal codes: 396650, 396651, 396653, 396655–396660, 396669
- Dialing code: +7 47396
- OKTMO ID: 20647101001
- Website: www.rossosh.info

Rossosh (Russian: Рóссошь) is a town and the administrative center of Rossoshansky District in Voronezh Oblast, Russia.

== Administrative and municipal status ==
Within the framework of administrative divisions, Rossosh serves as the administrative center of Rossoshansky District. As an administrative division, it is incorporated within Rossoshansky District as Rossosh Urban Settlement. As a municipal division, this administrative unit also has urban settlement status and is a part of Rossoshansky Municipal District.

== Demographics ==
Population:

60,879 (2021 census); 62,865 (2010 census); 62,923 (2002 census); 57,029 (1989 Soviet census).

== See also ==
- Ostrogozhsk–Rossosh Offensive
