= Rossoshansky District =

Rossoshansky District Россошанский район (Russian)
- District
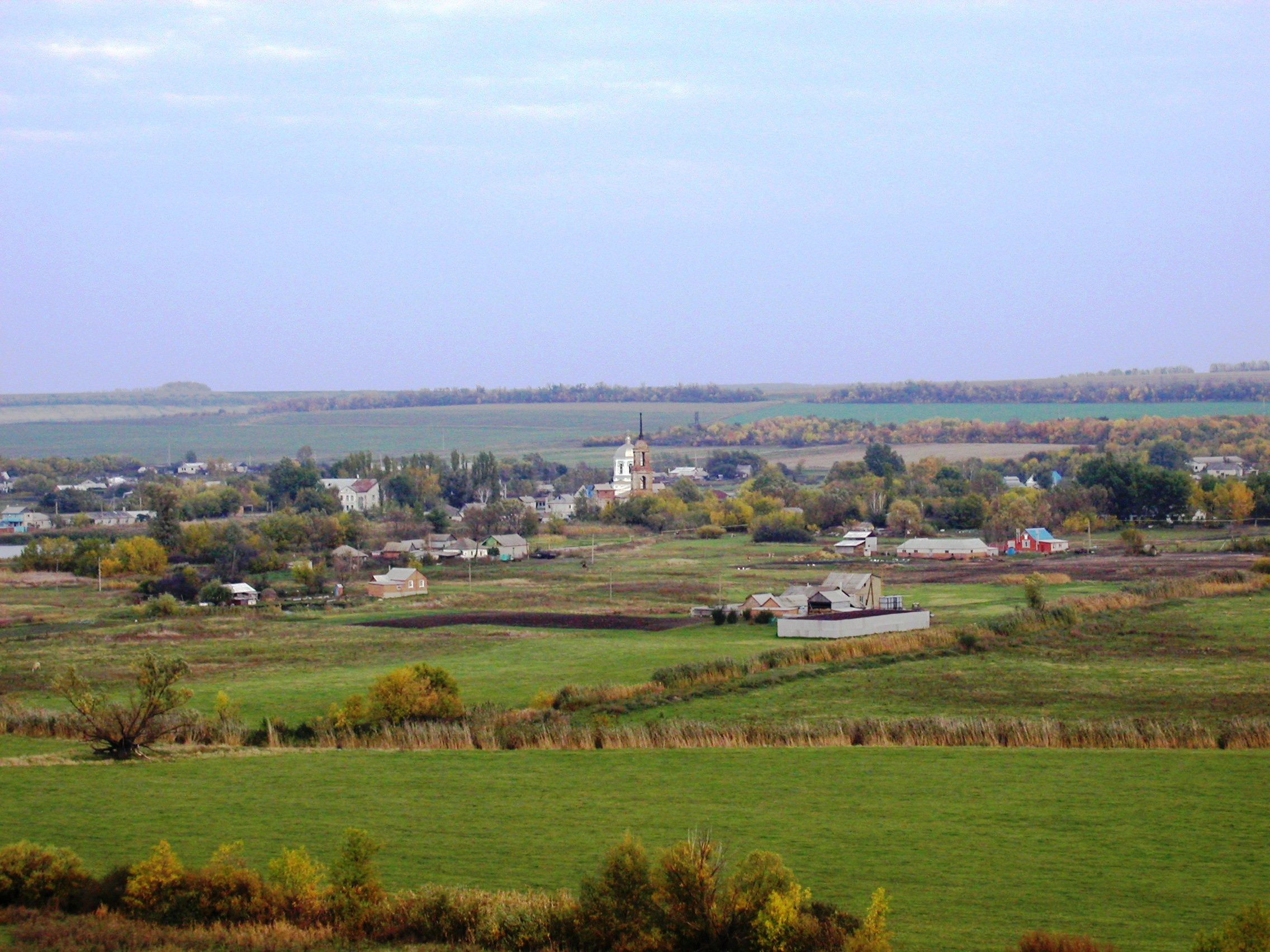
- Landscape at Zhilino, Rossoshansky District

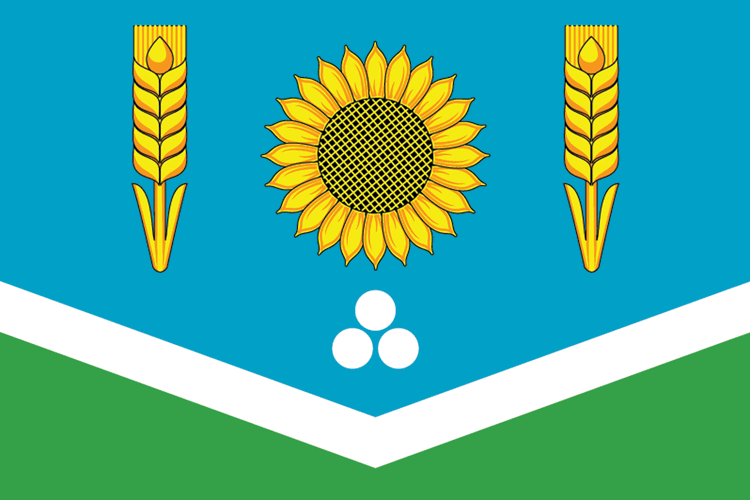
- Flag Coat of arms
- Location of Rossoshansky District in Voronezh Oblast
- Coordinates: 51°08′N 38°31′E
- Country: Russia
- Federal subject: Voronezh Oblast
- Established: 1928
- Administrative center: Rossosh

Area
  - Total: 2,371 km^{2} (915 sq mi)

Population (2010 Census)
  - Total: 94,694
  - Density: 39.94/km^{2} (103.4/sq mi)
  - Urban: 66.4%
  - Rural: 33.6%

Administrative structure
  - Administrative divisions: 1 Urban settlements, 17 Rural settlements
  - Inhabited localities: 1 cities/towns, 88 rural localities

Municipal structure
  - Municipally incorporated as: Rossoshansky Municipal District
  - Municipal divisions: 1 urban settlements, 17 rural settlements
- Time zone: UTC+3 (MSK)
- OKTMO ID: 20647000
- Website: http://www.rossadm.ru/

Rossoshansky District (Russian: Россоша́нский райо́н) is an administrative and municipal district (raion), one of the thirty-two in Voronezh Oblast, Russia. It is located in the southwest of the oblast. The area of the district is 2,371 square kilometers (915 sq mi). Its administrative center is the town of Rossosh. Population: 88,923 (2021 census); 94,694 (2010 census); 31,750 (2002 census); 32,126 (1989 Soviet census). The population of Rossosh accounts for 68.5% of the district's total population.
