= Arkhangelsky (rural locality) =

Arkhangelsky (Russian: Архангельский; masculine), Arkhangelskaya (Архангельская; feminine), or Arkhangelskoye (Архангельское; neuter) is the name of several rural localities in Russia.

== Altai Krai ==
As of 2010, one rural locality in Altai Krai bears this name:

- Arkhangelskoye, Altai Krai, a selo under the administrative jurisdiction of the town of krai significance of Slavgorod

== Arkhangelsk Oblast ==
As of 2010, one rural locality in Arkhangelsk Oblast bears this name:

- Arkhangelskaya, Arkhangelsk Oblast, a village in Verkhopadengsky Selsoviet of Shenkursky District

== Republic of Bashkortostan ==
As of 2010, two rural localities in the Republic of Bashkortostan bear this name:

- Arkhangelskoye, Arkhangelsky District, Republic of Bashkortostan, a selo in Arkhangelsky Selsoviet of Arkhangelsky District
- Arkhangelskoye, Gafuriysky District, Republic of Bashkortostan, a selo in Tabynsky Selsoviet of Gafuriysky District

== Belgorod Oblast ==
As of 2010, three rural localities in Belgorod Oblast bear this name:

- Arkhangelskoye, Gubkinsky District, Belgorod Oblast, a selo in Gubkinsky District
- Arkhangelskoye, Shebekinsky District, Belgorod Oblast, a selo in Shebekinsky District
- Arkhangelskoye, Starooskolsky District, Belgorod Oblast, a selo in Starooskolsky District

== Bryansk Oblast ==
As of 2010, one rural locality in Bryansk Oblast bears this name:

- Arkhangelsky, Bryansk Oblast, a settlement in Malfinsky Selsoviet of Vygonichsky District

== Chelyabinsk Oblast ==
As of 2010, two rural localities in Chelyabinsk Oblast bear this name:

- Arkhangelskoye, Miass, Chelyabinsk Oblast, a settlement under the administrative jurisdiction of the City of Miass
- Arkhangelskoye, Sosnovsky District, Chelyabinsk Oblast, a selo in Arkhangelsky Selsoviet of Sosnovsky District

== Kirov Oblast ==
As of 2010, three rural localities in Kirov Oblast bear this name:

- Arkhangelskoye, Nemsky District, Kirov Oblast, a selo in Arkhangelsky Rural Okrug of Nemsky District
- Arkhangelskoye, Shabalinsky District, Kirov Oblast, a selo in Novotroitsky Rural Okrug of Shabalinsky District
- Arkhangelskoye, Urzhumsky District, Kirov Oblast, a selo in Bogdanovsky Rural Okrug of Urzhumsky District

== Kostroma Oblast ==
As of 2010, two rural localities in Kostroma Oblast bear this name:

- Arkhangelskoye, Ponazyrevsky District, Kostroma Oblast, a selo in Khmelevskoye Settlement of Ponazyrevsky District
- Arkhangelskoye, Vokhomsky District, Kostroma Oblast, a village in Belkovskoye Settlement of Vokhomsky District

== Krasnodar Krai ==
As of 2010, one rural locality in Krasnodar Krai bears this name:

- Arkhangelskaya, Krasnodar Krai, a stanitsa in Arkhangelsky Rural Okrug of Tikhoretsky District

== Krasnoyarsk Krai ==
As of 2010, one rural locality in Krasnoyarsk Krai bears this name:

- Arkhangelskoye, Krasnoyarsk Krai, a village in Rudyansky Selsoviet of Kansky District

== Lipetsk Oblast ==
As of 2010, four rural localities in Lipetsk Oblast bear this name:

- Arkhangelskoye, Chaplyginsky District, Lipetsk Oblast, a village in Petelinsky Selsoviet of Chaplyginsky District
- Arkhangelskoye, Krasninsky District, Lipetsk Oblast, a selo in Gudalovsky Selsoviet of Krasninsky District
- Arkhangelskoye, Yeletsky District, Lipetsk Oblast, a selo in Arkhangelsky Selsoviet of Yeletsky District
- Arkhangelskoye, Zadonsky District, Lipetsk Oblast, a selo in Kalabinsky Selsoviet of Zadonsky District

== Moscow Oblast ==
As of 2010, five rural localities in Moscow Oblast bear this name:

- Arkhangelskoye, Krasnogorsky District, Moscow Oblast, a settlement in Ilyinskoye Rural Settlement of Krasnogorsky District
- Arkhangelskoye, Novofedorovskoye Rural Settlement, Naro-Fominsky District, Moscow Oblast, a village in Novofedorovskoye Rural Settlement of Naro-Fominsky District
- Arkhangelskoye, Veselevskoye Rural Settlement, Naro-Fominsky District, Moscow Oblast, a village in Veselevskoye Rural Settlement of Naro-Fominsky District
- Arkhangelskoye, Ruzsky District, Moscow Oblast, a selo in Dorokhovskoye Rural Settlement of Ruzsky District
- Arkhangelskoye, Shakhovskoy District, Moscow Oblast, a village in Seredinskoye Rural Settlement of Shakhovskoy District

== Nizhny Novgorod Oblast ==
As of 2010, one rural locality in Nizhny Novgorod Oblast bears this name:

- Arkhangelskoye, Nizhny Novgorod Oblast, a selo in Arkhangelsky Selsoviet of Shatkovsky District

== Orenburg Oblast ==
As of 2010, one rural locality in Orenburg Oblast bears this name:

- Arkhangelskoye, Orenburg Oblast, a selo in Dombarovsky Selsoviet of Dombarovsky District

== Oryol Oblast ==
As of 2010, six rural localities in Oryol Oblast bear this name:

- Arkhangelsky, Mikhnevsky Selsoviet, Bolkhovsky District, Oryol Oblast, a settlement in Mikhnevsky Selsoviet of Bolkhovsky District
- Arkhangelsky, Novosinetsky Selsoviet, Bolkhovsky District, Oryol Oblast, a settlement in Novosinetsky Selsoviet of Bolkhovsky District
- Arkhangelsky, Verkhovsky District, Oryol Oblast, a khutor in Konshinsky Selsoviet of Verkhovsky District
- Arkhangelskoye, Glazunovsky District, Oryol Oblast, a selo in Ochkinsky Selsoviet of Glazunovsky District
- Arkhangelskoye, Uritsky District, Oryol Oblast, a selo in Arkhangelsky Selsoviet of Uritsky District
- Arkhangelskoye, Zalegoshchensky District, Oryol Oblast, a selo in Oktyabrsky Selsoviet of Zalegoshchensky District

== Penza Oblast ==
As of 2010, two rural localities in Penza Oblast bear this name:

- Arkhangelskoye, Gorodishchensky District, Penza Oblast, a selo in Arkhangelsky Selsoviet of Gorodishchensky District
- Arkhangelskoye, Sosnovoborsky District, Penza Oblast, a selo in Nikolo-Barnukovsky Selsoviet of Sosnovoborsky District

== Perm Krai ==
As of 2010, one rural locality in Perm Krai bears this name:

- Arkhangelskoye, Perm Krai, a selo in Yusvinsky District

== Ryazan Oblast ==
As of 2010, one rural locality in Ryazan Oblast bears this name:

- Arkhangelskoye, Ryazan Oblast, a selo in Voyeykovsky Rural Okrug of Miloslavsky District

== Samara Oblast ==
As of 2010, one rural locality in Samara Oblast bears this name:

- Arkhangelsky, Samara Oblast, a settlement in Syzransky District

== Stavropol Krai ==
As of 2010, one rural locality in Stavropol Krai bears this name:

- Arkhangelskoye, Stavropol Krai, a selo in Budyonnovsky District

== Tambov Oblast ==
As of 2010, one rural locality in Tambov Oblast bears this name:

- Arkhangelskaya, Tambov Oblast, a village in Rakshinsky Selsoviet of Morshansky District

== Tula Oblast ==
As of 2010, five rural localities in Tula Oblast bear this name:

- Arkhangelskoye, Chernsky District, Tula Oblast, a selo in Arkhangelskaya Rural Administration of Chernsky District
- Arkhangelskoye, Kamensky District, Tula Oblast, a selo in Arkhangelsky Rural Okrug of Kamensky District
- Arkhangelskoye, Leninsky District, Tula Oblast, a selo in Arkhangelsky Rural Okrug of Leninsky District
- Arkhangelskoye, Shchyokinsky District, Tula Oblast, a selo in Danilovskaya Rural Administration of Shchyokinsky District
- Arkhangelskoye, Yasnogorsky District, Tula Oblast, a selo in Arkhangelskaya Rural Territory of Yasnogorsky District

== Tver Oblast ==
As of 2010, five rural localities in Tver Oblast bear this name:

- Arkhangelskoye, Kashinsky District, Tver Oblast, a village in Kashinsky District
- Arkhangelskoye (Zavidovo Rural Settlement), Konakovsky District, Tver Oblast, a village in Konakovsky District; municipally, a part of Zavidovo Rural Settlement of that district
- Arkhangelskoye (Dmitrovogorskoye Rural Settlement), Konakovsky District, Tver Oblast, a village in Konakovsky District; municipally, a part of Dmitrovogorskoye Rural Settlement of that district
- Arkhangelskoye, Staritsky District, Tver Oblast, a village in Staritsky District
- Arkhangelskoye, Udomelsky District, Tver Oblast, a village in Udomelsky District

== Tyumen Oblast ==
As of 2010, one rural locality in Tyumen Oblast bears this name:

- Arkhangelskoye, Tyumen Oblast, a selo in Arkhangelsky Rural Okrug of Isetsky District

== Udmurt Republic ==
As of 2010, one rural locality in the Udmurt Republic bears this name:

- Arkhangelskoye, Udmurt Republic, a selo in Arkhangelsky Selsoviet of Krasnogorsky District

== Ulyanovsk Oblast ==
As of 2010, two rural localities in Ulyanovsk Oblast bear this name:

- Arkhangelskoye, Cherdaklinsky District, Ulyanovsk Oblast, a selo in Mirnovsky Rural Okrug of Cherdaklinsky District
- Arkhangelskoye, Sursky District, Ulyanovsk Oblast, a selo in Chebotayevsky Rural Okrug of Sursky District

== Vologda Oblast ==
As of 2010, three rural localities in Vologda Oblast bear this name:

- Arkhangelskoye, Babayevsky District, Vologda Oblast, a village in Volkovsky Selsoviet of Babayevsky District
- Arkhangelskoye, Cherepovetsky District, Vologda Oblast, a selo in Musorsky Selsoviet of Cherepovetsky District
- Arkhangelskoye, Sokolsky District, Vologda Oblast, a selo in Arkhangelsky Selsoviet of Sokolsky District

== Voronezh Oblast ==
As of 2010, five rural localities in Voronezh Oblast bear this name:

- Arkhangelskoye, Anninsky District, Voronezh Oblast, a selo in Arkhangelskoye Rural Settlement of Anninsky District
- Arkhangelskoye, Khokholsky District, Voronezh Oblast, a selo in Arkhangelskoye Rural Settlement of Khokholsky District
- Arkhangelskoye, Ramonsky District, Voronezh Oblast, a settlement in Bolshevereyskoye Rural Settlement of Ramonsky District
- Arkhangelskoye, Plyasovatskoye Rural Settlement, Verkhnekhavsky District, Voronezh Oblast, a selo in Plyasovatskoye Rural Settlement of Verkhnekhavsky District
- Arkhangelskoye, Verkhneplavitskoye Rural Settlement, Verkhnekhavsky District, Voronezh Oblast, a village in Verkhneplavitskoye Rural Settlement of Verkhnekhavsky District

== Yaroslavl Oblast ==
As of 2010, three rural localities in Yaroslavl Oblast bear this name:

- Arkhangelskoye, Myshkinsky District, Yaroslavl Oblast, a selo in Arkhangelsky Rural Okrug of Myshkinsky District
- Arkhangelskoye, Pereslavsky District, Yaroslavl Oblast, a village in Skoblevsky Rural Okrug of Pereslavsky District
- Arkhangelskoye, Uglichsky District, Yaroslavl Oblast, a selo in Slobodskoy Rural Okrug of Uglichsky District

== Zabaykalsky Krai ==
As of 2010, one rural locality in Zabaykalsky Krai bears this name:

- Arkhangelskoye, Zabaykalsky Krai, a selo in Krasnochikoysky District

== See also ==
- Khutor Arkhangelsky, a rural locality (a village) in Ugransky District of Smolensk Oblast
- Sovkhoz Arkhangelsky, a rural locality (a settlement) in Naro-Fominsky District of Moscow Oblast
