= Nashchyokino =

Nashchyokino Нащёкино
- Selo
- Location within Voronezh Oblast Location within Russia
- Coordinates: 51°23′N 40°08′E
- Country: Russia
- Region: Voronezh Oblast
- District: Anninsky District
- Time zone: UTC+3:00

Nashchyokino (Russian: Нащёкино) is a rural locality (a selo) and the administrative center of Nashchyokinskoye Rural Settlement, Anninsky District, Voronezh Oblast, Russia. The population was 529 as of 2010. There are 7 streets.

== Geography ==
Nashchyokino is located 30 km southwest of Anna (the district's administrative centre) by road. Studyonnoye is the nearest rural locality.
