= Kupros =

Kupros Купрос
- Selo
- Location within Perm Krai Location within Russia
- Coordinates: 58°59′N 55°31′E
- Country: Russia
- Region: Perm Krai
- District: Yusvinsky District
- Time zone: UTC+5:00

Kupros (Russian: Купрос) is a rural locality (a selo) and the administrative center of Kuprosskoye Rural Settlement, Yusvinsky District, Perm Krai, Russia. The population was 475 as of 2010. There are 18 streets.

== Geography ==
Kupros is located 37 km east of Yusva (the district's administrative centre) by road. Kuzmino is the nearest rural locality.
