= Posyolok otdeleniya 2-ya Pyatiletka sovkhoza Krasnoye Znamya =

Posyolok otdeleniya 2-ya Pyatiletka sovkhoza Krasnoye Znamya Посёлок отделения «2-я Пятилетка» совхоза «Красное Знамя»
- Settlement
- Location within Voronezh Oblast Location within Russia
- Coordinates: 51°36′N 40°42′E
- Country: Russia
- Region: Voronezh Oblast
- District: Anninsky District
- Time zone: UTC+3:00

Posyolok otdeleniya 2-ya Pyatiletka sovkhoza Krasnoye Znamya (Russian: Посёлок отделения «2-я Пятилетка» совхоза «Красное Знамя») is a rural locality (a settlement) in Rubashevskoye Rural Settlement, Anninsky District, Voronezh Oblast, Russia. The population was 53 as of 2010. There are 2 streets.

== Geography ==
The settlement is located 34 km northeast of Anna (the district's administrative centre) by road. Rubashevka is the nearest rural locality.
