= Asanovo =

Asanovo Асаново
- Village
- Location within Perm Krai Location within Russia
- Coordinates: 58°57′N 54°54′E
- Country: Russia
- Region: Perm Krai
- District: Yusvinsky District
- Time zone: UTC+5:00

Asanovo (Russian: Асаново) is a rural locality (a village) in Yusvinskoye Rural Settlement, Yusvinsky District, Perm Krai, Russia. The population was 22 as of 2010. There is 1 street.

== Geography ==
Asanovo is located 4 km southwest of Yusva (the district's administrative centre) by road. Pakhomovo is the nearest rural locality.
