= Bazhino =

Bazhino Бажино
- Village
- Location within Perm Krai Location within Russia
- Coordinates: 59°07′N 55°24′E
- Country: Russia
- Region: Perm Krai
- District: Yusvinsky District
- Time zone: UTC+5:00

Bazhino (Russian: Бажино) is a rural locality (a village) in Kuprosskoye Rural Settlement, Yusvinsky District, Perm Krai, Russia. The population was 8 as of 2010. There are 4 streets.

== Geography ==
Bazhino is located 12 km east of Yusva (the district's administrative centre) by road. Tarakanovo is the nearest rural locality.
