= Bolshye Yasyrki =

Bolshye Yasyrki Большие Ясырки
- Selo
- Location within Voronezh Oblast Location within Russia
- Coordinates: 51°36′N 40°28′E
- Country: Russia
- Region: Voronezh Oblast
- District: Anninsky District
- Time zone: UTC+3:00

Bolshye Yasyrki (Russian: Большие Ясырки) is a rural locality (a selo) in Rubashevskoye Rural Settlement, Anninsky District, Voronezh Oblast, Russia. The population was 646 as of 2010. There are 10 streets.

== Geography ==
Bolshye Yasyrki is located on the Bityug River, 22 km north of Anna (the district's administrative centre) by road. Mosolovka is the nearest rural locality.
