= Gusevka 2nd =

Gusevka 2nd Гусевка 2-я
- Settlement
- Location within Voronezh Oblast Location within Russia
- Coordinates: 51°20′N 40°50′E
- Country: Russia
- Region: Voronezh Oblast
- District: Anninsky District
- Time zone: UTC+3:00

Gusevka 2nd (Russian: Гусевка 2-я) is a rural locality (a settlement) in Novozhiznenskoye Rural Settlement, Anninsky District, Voronezh Oblast, Russia. The population was 179 as of 2010. There are 5 streets.

== Geography ==
Gusevka 2nd is located 40 km southeast of Anna (the district's administrative centre) by road. Alexandrovka is the nearest rural locality.
