= Kharino, Yusvinsky District, Perm Krai =

Kharino Харино
- Village
- Location within Perm Krai Location within Russia
- Coordinates: 58°56′N 55°03′E
- Country: Russia
- Region: Perm Krai
- District: Yusvinsky District
- Time zone: UTC+5:00

Kharino (Russian: Харино) is a rural locality (a village) in Yusvinskoye Rural Settlement, Yusvinsky District, Perm Krai, Russia. The population was 101 as of 2010. There are 6 streets.

== Geography ==
Kharino is located 7 km southeast of Yusva (the district's administrative centre) by road. Spirino is the nearest rural locality.
