= Ramonye =

Ramonye Рамонье
- Selo
- Location within Voronezh Oblast Location within Russia
- Coordinates: 51°24′N 41°06′E
- Country: Russia
- Region: Voronezh Oblast
- District: Anninsky District
- Time zone: UTC+3:00

Ramonye (Russian: Рамонье) is a rural locality (a selo) and the administrative center of Ramonskoye Rural Settlement, Anninsky District, Voronezh Oblast, Russia. The population was 864 as of 2010. There are 15 streets.

== Geography ==
Ramonye is located 55 km east of Anna (the district's administrative centre) by road. Gusevka is the nearest rural locality.
