= Stary Kurlak =

Stary Kurlak Старый Курлак
- Selo
- Location within Voronezh Oblast Location within Russia
- Coordinates: 51°24′N 40°31′E
- Country: Russia
- Region: Voronezh Oblast
- District: Anninsky District
- Time zone: UTC+3:00

Stary Kurlak (Russian: Старый Курлак) is a rural locality (a selo) in Novokurlakskoye Rural Settlement, Anninsky District, Voronezh Oblast, Russia. The population was 361 as of 2010. There are 7 streets.

== Geography ==
Stary Kurlak is located 22 km southeast of Anna (the district's administrative centre) by road. Novy Kurlak is the nearest rural locality.
