= Mosolovka =

Mosolovka Мосоловка
- Selo
- Location within Voronezh Oblast Location within Russia
- Coordinates: 51°34′N 40°26′E
- Country: Russia
- Region: Voronezh Oblast
- District: Anninsky District
- Time zone: UTC+3:00

Mosolovka (Russian: Мосоловка) is a rural locality (a selo) and the administrative center of Mosolovskoye Rural Settlement, Anninsky District, Voronezh Oblast, Russia. The population was 375 as of 2010. There are 7 streets.

== Geography ==
Mosolovka is located 10 km north of Anna (the district's administrative centre) by road. Pervomayskoye is the nearest rural locality.
