= Pochasher =

Pochasher Почашер
- Village
- Location within Perm Krai Location within Russia
- Coordinates: 58°56′N 54°57′E
- Country: Russia
- Region: Perm Krai
- District: Yusvinsky District
- Time zone: UTC+5:00

Pochasher (Russian: Почашер) is a rural locality (a village) in Yusvinskoye Rural Settlement, Yusvinsky District, Perm Krai, Russia. The population was 47 as of 2010. There is one street.

== Geography ==
Pochasher is located 4 km south of Yusva (the district's administrative centre) by road. Yusva is the nearest rural locality.
