= Zagirshchino =

Zagirshchino Загорщино
- Selo
- Location within Voronezh Oblast Location within Russia
- Coordinates: 51°16′N 40°20′E
- Country: Russia
- Region: Voronezh Oblast
- District: Anninsky District
- Time zone: UTC+3:00

Zagirshchino (Russian: Загорщино) is a rural locality (a selo) in Starochigolskoye Rural Settlement, Anninsky District, Voronezh Oblast, Russia. The population was 72 as of 2010.

== Geography ==
Zagirshchino is located 33 km south of Anna (the district's administrative centre) by road. Staraya Chigla is the nearest rural locality.
