= Artamonovo =

Artamonovo Артамоново
- Village
- Location within Perm Krai Location within Russia
- Coordinates: 58°57′N 55°01′E
- Country: Russia
- Region: Perm Krai
- District: Yusvinsky District
- Time zone: UTC+5:00

Artamonovo (Russian: Артамоново) is a rural locality (a village) in Yusvinskoye Rural Settlement, Yusvinsky District, Perm Krai, Russia. The population was 19 as of 2010. There are 2 streets.

== Geography ==
Artamonovo is located 5 km east of Yusva (the district's administrative centre) by road. Spirino is the nearest rural locality.
