= Sadovoye, Voronezh Oblast =

Sadovoye Садовое
- Selo
- Location within Voronezh Oblast Location within Russia
- Coordinates: 51°32′N 40°29′E
- Country: Russia
- Region: Voronezh Oblast
- District: Anninsky District
- Time zone: UTC+3:00

Sadovoye (Russian: Садовое) is a rural locality (a selo) and the administrative center of Sadovskoye Rural Settlement, Anninsky District, Voronezh Oblast, Russia. In ХІХ century the village was part of Sadovskaya volost, Bobrovsky Uyezd, Voronezh Governorate. The population was 4,298 as of 2010. There are 35 streets.

== Geography ==
Sadovoye is located 13 km northeast of Anna (the district's administrative centre) by road. Zhelannoye is the nearest rural locality.
