= Saburovka =

Saburovka Сабуровка
- Selo
- Location within Voronezh Oblast Location within Russia
- Coordinates: 51°34′N 40°22′E
- Country: Russia
- Region: Voronezh Oblast
- District: Anninsky District
- Time zone: UTC+3:00

Saburovka (Russian: Сабуровка) is a rural locality (a selo) in Mosolovskoye Rural Settlement, Anninsky District, Voronezh Oblast, Russia. The population was 129 as of 2010. There are 3 streets.

== Geography ==
Saburovka is located 15 km north of Anna (the district's administrative centre) by road. Zhelannoye is the nearest rural locality.
