= Bobyakovo =

Bobyakovo Бобяково
- Selo
- Location within Voronezh Oblast Location within Russia
- Coordinates: 51°30′N 40°48′E
- Country: Russia
- Region: Voronezh Oblast
- District: Anninsky District
- Time zone: UTC+3:00

Bobyakovo (Russian: Бобяково) is a rural locality (a selo) in Khleborodnenskoye Rural Settlement, Anninsky District, Voronezh Oblast, Russia. The population was 85 as of 2010. There are 3 streets.

== Geography ==
Bobyakovo is located near the Bolshoy and Maly Kurlak Rivers, 34 km west of Anna (the district's administrative centre) by road. Brodovoye is the nearest rural locality.
