= Ostrovki =

Ostrovki Островки
- Selo
- Location within Voronezh Oblast Location within Russia
- Coordinates: 51°25′N 40°55′E
- Country: Russia
- Region: Voronezh Oblast
- District: Anninsky District
- Time zone: UTC+3:00

Ostrovki (Russian: Островки) is a rural locality (a selo) and the administrative center of Ostrovksoye Rural Settlement, Anninsky District, Voronezh Oblast, Russia. The population was 727 as of 2010. There are 6 streets.

== Geography ==
Ostrovki is located 40 km east of Anna (the district's administrative centre) by road. Arkhangelskoye is the nearest rural locality.
