= Galyasher =

Galyasher Галяшер
- Village
- Location within Perm Krai Location within Russia
- Coordinates: 58°59′N 55°33′E
- Country: Russia
- Region: Perm Krai
- District: Yusvinsky District
- Time zone: UTC+5:00

Galyasher (Russian: Галяшер) is a rural locality (a village) in Kuprosskoye Rural Settlement, Yusvinsky District, Perm Krai, Russia. The population was 1 as of 2010. There are 2 streets.

== Geography ==
Galyasher is located 40 km east of Yusva (the district's administrative centre) by road. Malaya Mochga is the nearest rural locality.
