= Deryabkino =

Deryabkino Дерябкино
- Selo
- Location within Voronezh Oblast Location within Russia
- Coordinates: 51°31′N 40°56′E
- Country: Russia
- Region: Voronezh Oblast
- District: Anninsky District
- Time zone: UTC+3:00

Deryabkino (Russian: Дерябкино) is a rural locality (a selo) and the administrative center of Deryabkinskoye Rural Settlement, Anninsky District, Voronezh Oblast, Russia. The population was 575 as of 2010. There are 10 streets.

== Geography ==
Deryabkino is located 47 km east of Anna (the district's administrative centre) by road. Rostoshi is the nearest rural locality.
