= Zhelannoye =

Zhelannoye Желанное
- Selo
- Location within Voronezh Oblast Location within Russia
- Coordinates: 51°32′N 40°25′E
- Country: Russia
- Region: Voronezh Oblast
- District: Anninsky District
- Time zone: UTC+3:00

Zhelannoye (Russian: Желанное) is a rural locality (a selo) in Mosolovskoye Rural Settlement, Anninsky District, Voronezh Oblast, Russia. The population was 301 as of 2010. There are 3 streets.

== Geography ==
Zhelannoye is located 7 km north of Anna (the district's administrative centre) by road. Anna is the nearest rural locality.
