= Rubashevka =

Rubashevka Рубашевка
- Settlement
- Location within Voronezh Oblast Location within Russia
- Coordinates: 51°36′N 40°38′E
- Country: Russia
- Region: Voronezh Oblast
- District: Anninsky District
- Time zone: UTC+3:00

Rubashevka (Russian: Рубашевка) is a rural locality (a settlement) and the administrative center of Rubashevskoye Rural Settlement, Anninsky District, Voronezh Oblast, Russia. The population was 451 as of 2010. There are 7 streets.

== Geography ==
Rubashevka is located 29 km northeast of Anna (the district's administrative centre) by road. Posyolok otdeleniya 2-ya Pyatiletka sovkhoza Krasnoye Znamya is the nearest rural locality.
