= Timino =

Timino Тимино
- Selo
- Location within Perm Krai Location within Russia
- Coordinates: 59°05′N 55°25′E
- Country: Russia
- Region: Perm Krai
- District: Yusvinsky District
- Time zone: UTC+5:00

Timino (Russian: Тимино) is a rural locality (a selo) in Yusvinsky District, Perm Krai, Russia. The population was 259 as of 2010. There are 10 streets.

== Geography ==
Timino is located 34 km northeast of Yusva (the district's administrative centre) by road. Ivachevo is the nearest rural locality.
