= Petrovka, Anninsky District, Voronezh Oblast =

Petrovka Петровка
- Settlement
- Location within Voronezh Oblast Location within Russia
- Coordinates: 51°17′N 40°51′E
- Country: Russia
- Region: Voronezh Oblast
- District: Anninsky District
- Time zone: UTC+3:00

Petrovka (Russian: Петровка) is a rural locality (a settlement) in Novozhiznenskoye Rural Settlement, Anninsky District, Voronezh Oblast, Russia. The population was 81 as of 2010. There are 2 streets.

== Geography ==
Petrovka is located 46 km southeast of Anna (the district's administrative centre) by road. Nikolayevka is the nearest rural locality.
