= Pozhva =

Pozhva Пожва
- Settlement
- Location within Perm Krai Location within Russia
- Coordinates: 59°04′N 56°06′E
- Country: Russia
- Region: Perm Krai
- District: Yusvinsky District
- Time zone: UTC+5:00

Pozhva (Russian: Пожва) is a rural locality (a settlement) and the administrative center of Pozhvinskoye Rural Settlement, Yusvinsky District, Perm Krai, Russia. The population was 3,131 as of 2010. There are 69 streets.

== Geography ==
Pozhva is located 75 km east of Yusva (the district's administrative centre) by road. Ust-Pozhva is the nearest rural locality.
