= Surovsky =

Surovsky Суровский
- Settlement
- Location within Voronezh Oblast Location within Russia
- Coordinates: 51°23′N 41°01′E
- Country: Russia
- Region: Voronezh Oblast
- District: Anninsky District
- Time zone: UTC+3:00

Surovsky (Russian: Суровский) is a rural locality (a settlement) in Ostrovksoye Rural Settlement, Anninsky District, Voronezh Oblast, Russia. The population was 109 as of 2010.

== Geography ==
Surovsky is located 48 km east of Anna (the district's administrative centre) by road. Ostrovki is the nearest rural locality.
