= Posyolok Pervomayskogo otdeleniya sovkhoza Pugachyovsky =

Posyolok Pervomayskogo otdeleniya sovkhoza Pugachyovsky Посёлок Первомайского отделения совхоза «Пугачёвский»
- Settlement
- Location within Voronezh Oblast Location within Russia
- Coordinates: 51°34′N 40°43′E
- Country: Russia
- Region: Voronezh Oblast
- District: Anninsky District
- Time zone: UTC+3:00

Posyolok Pervomayskogo otdeleniya sovkhoza Pugachyovsky (Russian: Посёлок Первомайского отделения совхоза «Пугачёвский») is a rural locality (a settlement) in Pugachyovskoye Rural Settlement, Anninsky District, Voronezh Oblast, Russia. The population was 51 as of 2010. There are 3 streets.

== Geography ==
The settlement is located 30 km northeast of Anna (the district's administrative centre) by road. Posyolok Oktyabrskogo otdeleniya sovkhoza Pugachyovsky is the nearest rural locality.
