= Staraya Chigla =

Staraya Chigla Старая Чигла
- Selo
- Location within Voronezh Oblast Location within Russia
- Coordinates: 51°16′N 40°22′E
- Country: Russia
- Region: Voronezh Oblast
- District: Anninsky District
- Time zone: UTC+3:00

Staraya Chigla (Russian: Старая Чигла) is a rural locality (a selo) and the administrative center of Starochigolskoye Rural Settlement, Anninsky District, Voronezh Oblast, Russia. The population was 792 as of 2010. There are 9 streets.

== Geography ==
Staraya Chigla is located 32 km south of Anna (the district's administrative centre) by road. Zagorshchino is the nearest rural locality.
