= Novy Kurlak =

Novy Kurlak Новый Курлак
- Selo
- Location within Voronezh Oblast Location within Russia
- Coordinates: 51°25′N 40°33′E
- Country: Russia
- Region: Voronezh Oblast
- District: Anninsky District
- Time zone: UTC+3:00

Novy Kurlak (Russian: Новый Курлак) is a rural locality (a selo) and the administrative center of Novokurlakskoye Rural Settlement, Anninsky District, Voronezh Oblast, Russia. The population was 585 as of 2010. There are 6 streets.

== Geography ==
Novy Kurlak is located 19 km southeast of Anna (the district's administrative centre) by road. Stary Kurlak is the nearest rural locality.
