= Gusevka, Voronezh Oblast =

Gusevka Гусевка
- Settlement
- Location within Voronezh Oblast Location within Russia
- Coordinates: 51°26′N 41°06′E
- Country: Russia
- Region: Voronezh Oblast
- District: Anninsky District
- Time zone: UTC+3:00

Gusevka (Russian: Гусевка) is a rural locality (a settlement) in Ramonskoye Rural Settlement, Anninsky District, Voronezh Oblast, Russia. The population was 93 as of 2010. There are 3 streets.

== Geography ==
Gusevka is located 51 km east of Anna (the district's administrative centre) by road. Ramonye is the nearest rural locality.
