= Bolshaya Alexeyevka =

Bolshaya Alexeyevka Большая Алексеевка
- Selo
- Location within Voronezh Oblast Location within Russia
- Coordinates: 51°32′N 40°46′E
- Country: Russia
- Region: Voronezh Oblast
- District: Anninsky District
- Time zone: UTC+3:00

Bolshaya Alexeyevka (Russian: Большая Алексеевка) is a rural locality (a selo) in Khleborodnenskoye Rural Settlement, Anninsky District, Voronezh Oblast, Russia. The population was 234 as of 2010. There are 3 streets.

== Geography ==
Bolshaya Alexeyevka is located near the Bolshoy and Maly Kurlak Rivers, 36 km northeast of Anna (the district's administrative centre) by road. Bobyakovo is the nearest rural locality.
