= Novonadezhdinsky =

Novonadezhdinsky Новонадеждинский
- Settlement
- Location within Voronezh Oblast Location within Russia
- Coordinates: 51°26′N 40°13′E
- Country: Russia
- Region: Voronezh Oblast
- District: Anninsky District
- Time zone: UTC+3:00

Novonadezhdinsky (Russian: Новонадеждинский) is a rural locality (a settlement) in Vasilyevskoye Rural Settlement, Anninsky District, Voronezh Oblast, Russia. The population was 707 as of 2010. There are 14 streets.

== Geography ==
Novonadezhdinsky is located 26 km west of Anna (the district's administrative centre) by road. Vasilyevka is the nearest rural locality.
