= Beryozovka, Anninsky District, Voronezh Oblast =

Beryozovka Берёзовка
- Selo
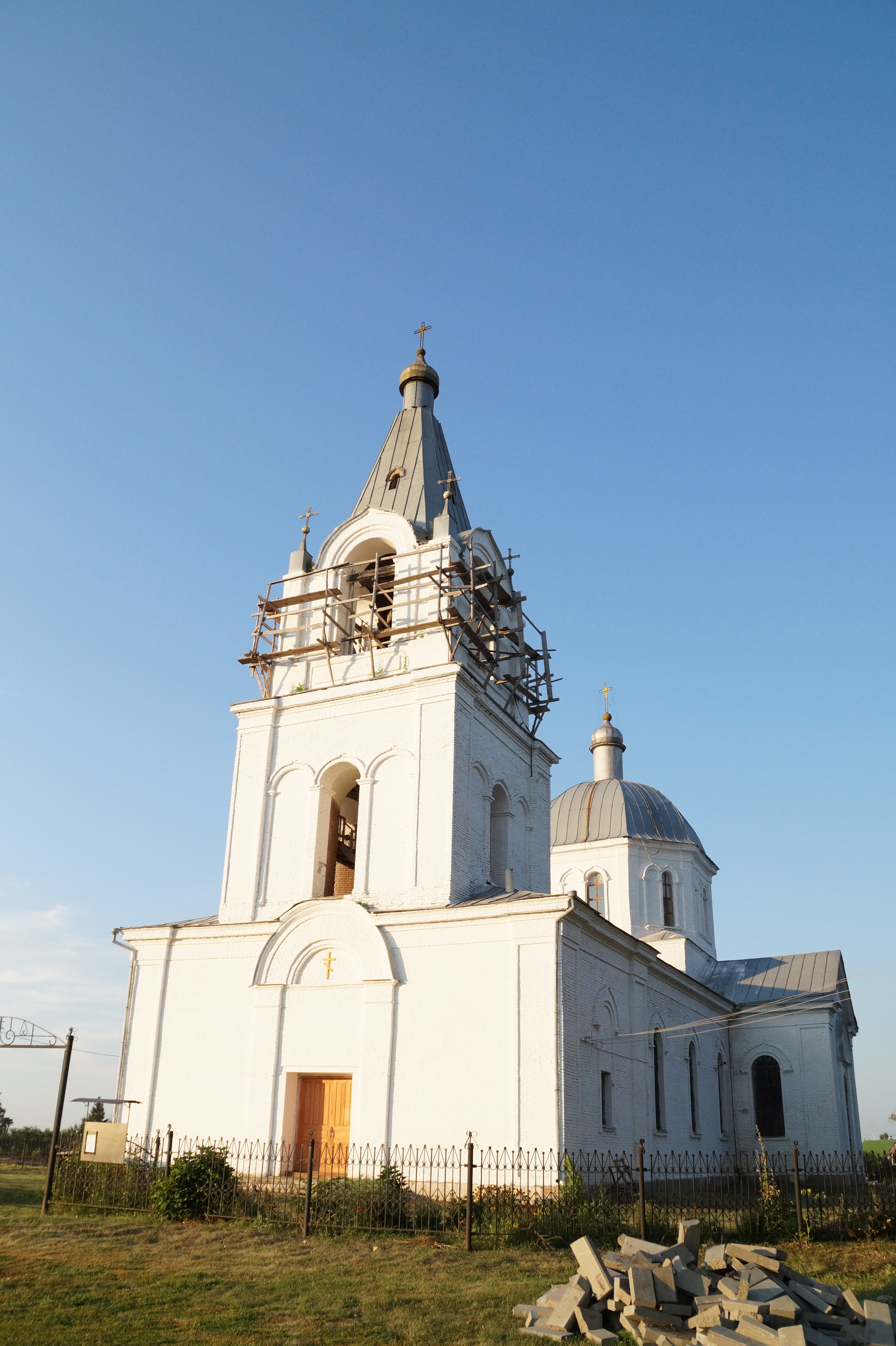

- Location within Voronezh Oblast Location within Russia
- Coordinates: 51°18′N 40°11′E
- Country: Russia
- Region: Voronezh Oblast
- District: Anninsky District
- Time zone: UTC+3:00

Beryozovka (Russian: Берёзовка) is a rural locality (a selo) and the administrative center of Beryozovskoye Rural Settlement, Anninsky District, Voronezh Oblast, Russia. The population was 936 as of 2010. There are 15 streets.

== Geography ==
Beryozovka is located 30 km southwest of Anna (the district's administrative centre) by road. Chesmenka is the nearest rural locality.
