= Brodovoye =

Brodovoye Бродовое
- Selo
- Location within Voronezh Oblast Location within Russia
- Coordinates: 51°28′N 40°30′E
- Country: Russia
- Region: Voronezh Oblast
- District: Anninsky District
- Time zone: UTC+3:00

Brodovoye (Russian: Бродовое) is a rural locality (a selo) and the administrative center of Brodovskoye Rural Settlement, Anninsky District, Voronezh Oblast, Russia. The population was 1,228 as of 2018. There are 15 streets.

== Geography ==
Brodovoye is located on the left bank of the Bityug River, 6 km east of Anna (the district's administrative centre) by road. Anna is the nearest rural locality.
