= Kruglovsky =

Kruglovsky Кругловский
- Settlement
- Location within Voronezh Oblast Location within Russia
- Coordinates: 51°25′N 41°03′E
- Country: Russia
- Region: Voronezh Oblast
- District: Anninsky District
- Time zone: UTC+3:00

Kruglovsky (Russian: Кругловский) is a rural locality (a settlement) in Ostrovskoye Rural Settlement, Anninsky District, Voronezh Oblast, Russia. The population was 145 as of 2010. There are 3 streets.

== Geography ==
Kruglovsky is located 48 km east of Anna (the district's administrative centre) by road. Arkhangelskoye is the nearest rural locality.
