= Novaya Zhizn, Anninsky District, Voronezh Oblast =

Novaya Zhizn Новая Жизнь
- Settlement
- Location within Voronezh Oblast Location within Russia
- Coordinates: 51°24′N 40°45′E
- Country: Russia
- Region: Voronezh Oblast
- District: Anninsky District
- Time zone: UTC+3:00

Novaya Zhizn (Russian: Новая Жизнь) is a rural locality (a settlement) and the administrative center of Novozhiznenskoye Rural Settlement, Anninsky District, Voronezh Oblast, Russia. The population was 555 as of 2010. There are 9 streets.

== Geography ==
Novaya Zhizn is located 28 km southeast of Anna (the district's administrative centre) by road. Khleborodnoye is the nearest rural locality.
