= Zhiginovo =

Zhiginovo Жигиново
- Village
- Location within Perm Krai Location within Russia
- Coordinates: 58°59′N 54°59′E
- Country: Russia
- Region: Perm Krai
- District: Yusvinsky District
- Time zone: UTC+5:00

Zhiginovo (Russian: Жигиново) is a rural locality (a village) in Yusvinskoye Rural Settlement, Yusvinsky District, Perm Krai, Russia. The population was 93 as of 2010. There are 3 streets.

== Geography ==
Zhiginovo is located 3 km northeast of Yusva (the district's administrative centre) by road. Anisimovo is the nearest rural locality.
