= Arkhangelskoye, Anninsky District, Voronezh Oblast =

Arkhangelskoye Архангельское
- Selo
- Location within Voronezh Oblast Location within Russia
- Coordinates: 51°26′N 40°55′E
- Country: Russia
- Region: Voronezh Oblast
- District: Anninsky District
- Time zone: UTC+3:00

Arkhangelskoye (Russian: Архангельское) is a rural locality (a selo) and the administrative center of Arkhangelskoye Rural Settlement, Anninsky District, Voronezh Oblast, Russia. The population was 2,165 as of 2018. There are 30 streets.

== Geography ==
Arkhangelskoye is located 38 km east of Anna (the district's administrative centre) by road. Ostrovki is the nearest rural locality.
