= Arkhangelskoye, Perm Krai =

Arkhangelskoye Архангельское
- Selo
- Location within Perm Krai Location within Russia
- Coordinates: 59°01′N 54°58′E
- Country: Russia
- Region: Perm Krai
- District: Yusvinsky District
- Time zone: UTC+5:00

Arkhangelskoye (Russian: Архангельское) is a rural locality (a selo) and the administrative center of Arkhangelskoye Rural Settlement, Yusvinsky District, Perm Krai, Russia. The population was 508 as of 2010. There are 24 streets.

== Geography ==
Arkhangelskoye is located 10 km north of Yusva (the district's administrative centre) by road. Sekovo is the nearest rural locality.
