= Arkhangelskoye, Zabaykalsky Krai =

Arkhangelskoye Архангельское
- Selo
- Location within Zabaykalsky Krai Location within Russia
- Coordinates: 50°19′N 108°44′E
- Country: Russia
- Region: Zabaykalsky Krai
- District: Krasnochikoysky District
- Time zone: UTC+9:00

Arkhangelskoye (Russian: Архангельское) is a rural locality (a selo) in Krasnochikoysky District, Zabaykalsky Krai, Russia. Population: 532 (2021 census); 602 (2010 census); 683 (2002 census); There are 17 streets in this selo.

== Geography ==
This rural locality is located 5 km from Krasny Chikoy (the district's administrative centre), 387 km from Chita (capital of Zabaykalsky Krai) and 5,087 km from Moscow. Alexandrovka is the nearest rural locality.
