= Alexandrovka, Krasnochikoysky District, Zabaykalsky Krai =

Alexandrovka Александровка
- Selo
- Location within Zabaykalsky Krai Location within Russia
- Coordinates: 50°20′N 108°49′E
- Country: Russia
- Region: Zabaykalsky Krai
- District: Krasnochikoysky District
- Time zone: UTC+9:00

Alexandrovka (Russian: Александровка) is a rural locality (a selo) in Krasnochikoysky District, Zabaykalsky Krai, Russia. Population: 101 (2021 census); 133 (2010 census); 136 (2002 census); There are 3 streets in this selo.

== Geography ==
This rural locality is located 5 km from Krasny Chikoy (the district's administrative centre), 382 km from Chita (capital of Zabaykalsky Krai) and 5,088 km from Moscow. Arkhangelskoye is the nearest rural locality.
