= Arkhangelskoye, Gafuriysky District, Republic of Bashkortostan =

Arkhangelskoye Архангельское
- Selo
- Location within Bashkortostan Location within Russia
- Coordinates: 54°04′N 56°24′E
- Country: Russia
- Region: Bashkortostan
- District: Gafuriysky District
- Time zone: UTC+5:00

Arkhangelskoye (Russian: Архангельское) is a rural locality (a selo) in Tabynsky Selsoviet, Gafuriysky District, Bashkortostan, Russia. The population was 145 as of 2010. There are 3 streets.

== Geography ==
Arkhangelskoye is located 24 km north of Krasnousolsky (the district's administrative centre) by road. Akhmetka is the nearest rural locality.
