= Arkhangelskoye, Kamensky District, Tula Oblast =

Arkhangelskoye Архангельское
- Selo
- Interactive map of Arkhangelskoye
- Location of Arkhangelskoye Arkhangelskoye (Tula Oblast)
- Coordinates: 53°15′44″N 37°41′56″E
- Country: Russia
- Federal subject: Tula Oblast
- Administrative district: Kamensky District
- SettlementSelsoviet: Arkhangelskoye Settlement

Population (2010 Census)
  - Total: 2,391
  - Estimate (2010): 2,391 (0%)

Administrative status
  - Capital of: Kamensky District, Arkhangelskoye Settlement

Municipal status
  - Municipal district: Kamensky Municipal District
  - Rural settlement: Arkhangelskoye Municipal Formation Rural Settlement
  - Capital of: Kamensky Municipal District, Arkhangelskoye Municipal Formation Rural Settlement
- Time zone: UTC+3 (MSK)
- Postal code: 301990
- OKTMO ID: 70624405101

Arkhangelskoye (Russian: Архангельское) is a rural locality (a selo) and the administrative center of Kamensky District of Tula Oblast, Russia. Population: 2,391 (2010 census); 2,768 (2002 census); 2,956 (1989 Soviet census).
