= Kamensky District, Tula Oblast =

Kamensky District Каменский район (Russian)
- District
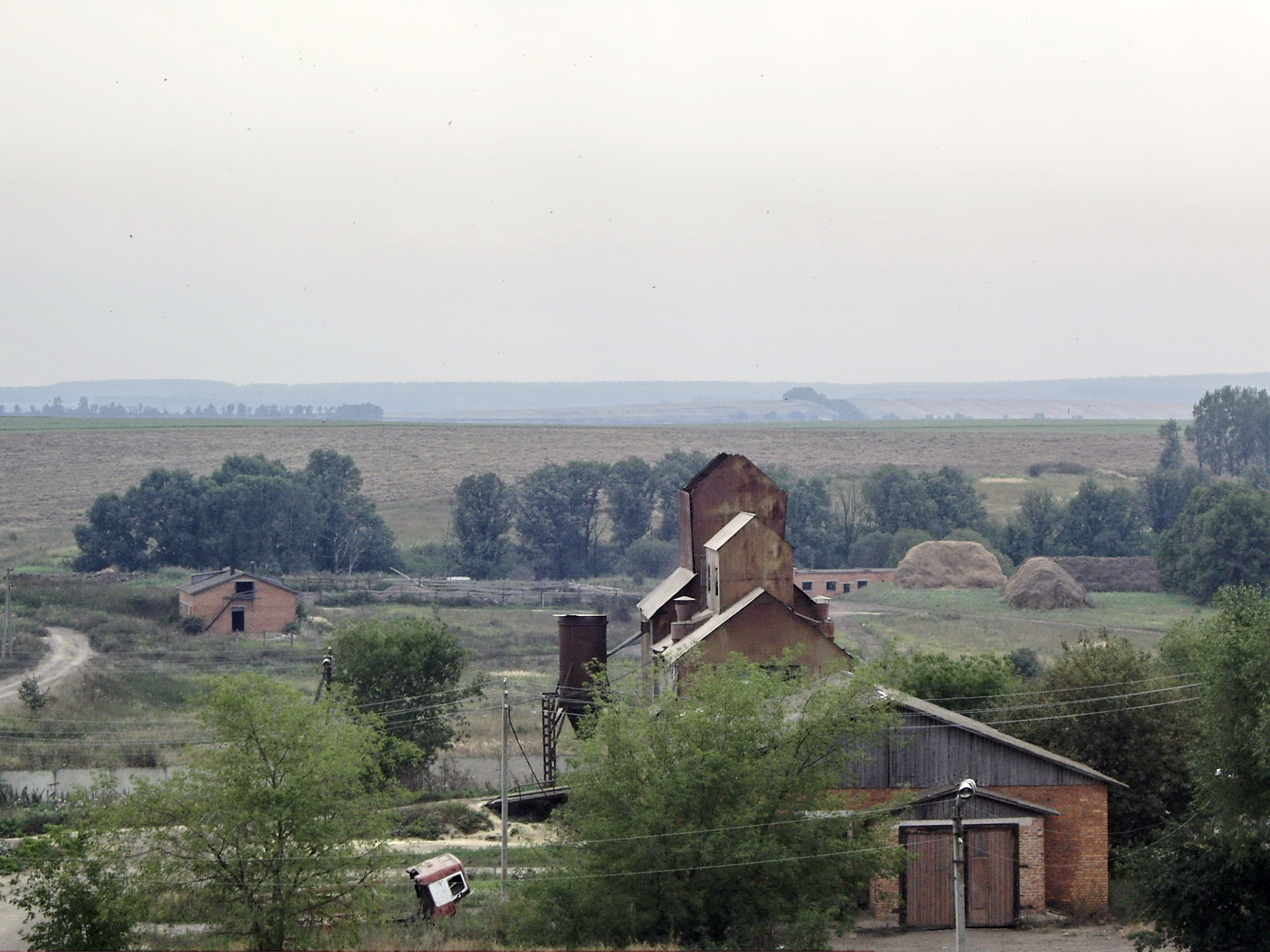
- Farm landscape in Kamensky District

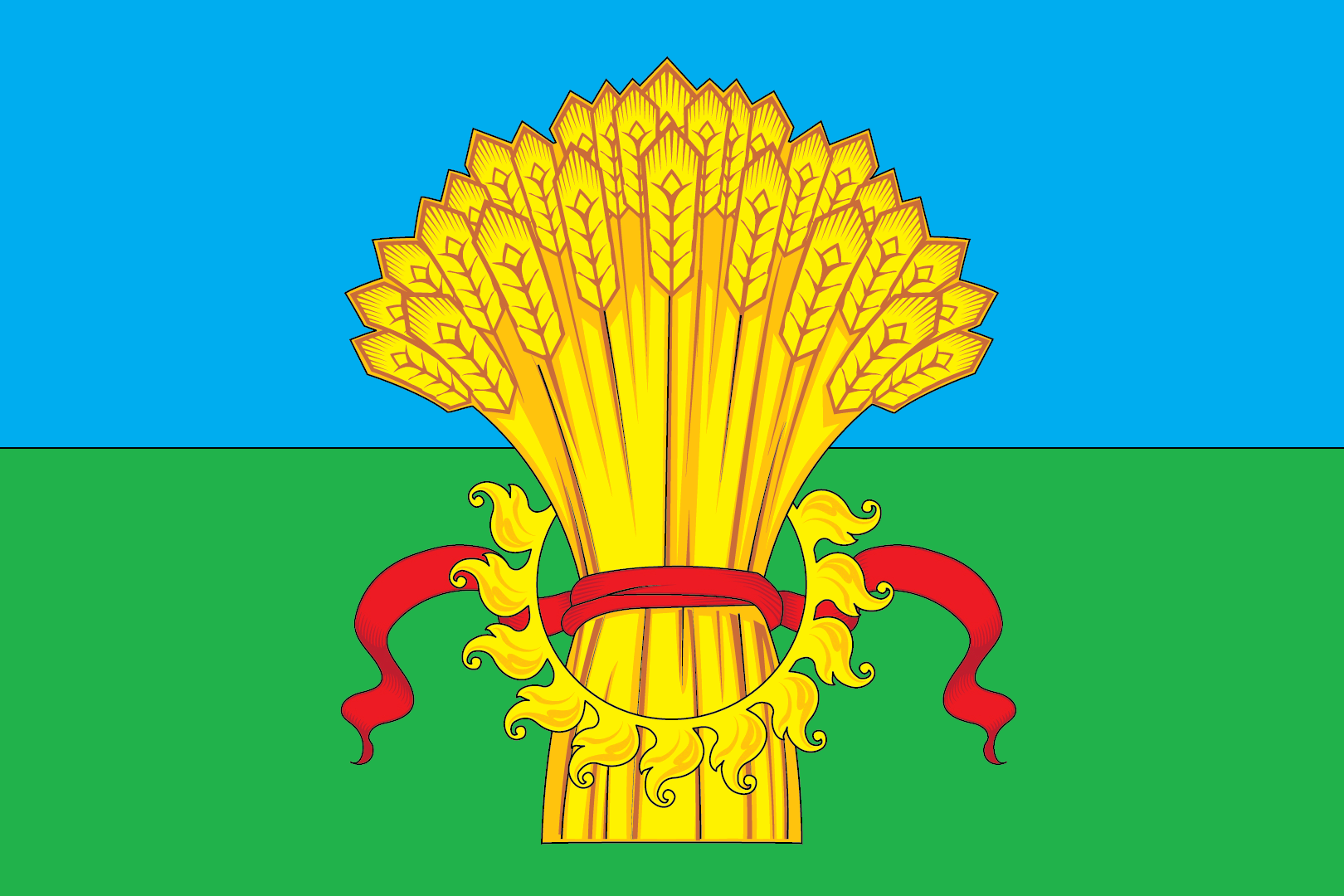
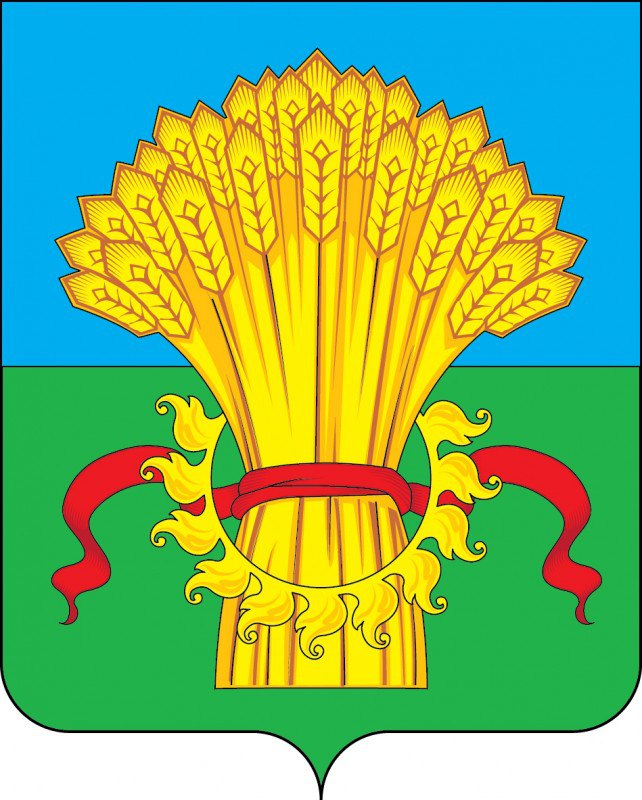
- Flag Coat of arms
- Location of Kamensky District in Tula Oblast
- Coordinates: 53°15′56″N 37°42′05″E
- Country: Russia
- Federal subject: Tula Oblast
- Established: May 1924
- Administrative center: Arkhangelskoye

Area
  - Total: 795 km^{2} (307 sq mi)

Population (2010 Census)
  - Total: 9,548
  - Density: 12.0/km^{2} (31.1/sq mi)
  - Urban: 0%
  - Rural: 100%

Administrative structure
  - Administrative divisions: 10 Rural okrugs
  - Inhabited localities: 100 rural localities

Municipal structure
  - Municipally incorporated as: Kamensky Municipal District
  - Municipal divisions: 0 urban settlements, 2 rural settlements
- Time zone: UTC+3 (MSK)
- OKTMO ID: 70624000
- Website: https://kamenskiy.tularegion.ru/

Kamensky District (Russian: Каменский райо́н) is an administrative district (raion), one of the twenty-three in Tula Oblast, Russia. As a municipal division, it is incorporated as Kamensky Municipal District. It is located in the south of the oblast. The area of the district is 795 square kilometers (307 sq mi). Its administrative center is the rural locality (a selo) of Arkhangelskoye. Population: 9,548 (2010 Census); 10,720 (2002 census); 11,007 (1989 Soviet census). The population of Arkhangelskoye accounts for 25.0% of the district's total population.
