= Arkhangelskoye, Cherepovetsky District, Vologda Oblast =

Arkhangelskoye Архангельское
- Selo
- Location within Vologda Oblast Location within Russia
- Coordinates: 58°56′N 38°43′E
- Country: Russia
- Region: Vologda Oblast
- District: Cherepovetsky District
- Time zone: UTC+3:00

Arkhangelskoye (Russian: Архангельское) is a rural locality (a selo) in Yugskoye Rural Settlement, Cherepovetsky District, Vologda Oblast, Russia. The population was 28 as of 2002.

== Geography ==
Arkhangelskoye is located 66 km (41 mi) southeast of Cherepovets (the district's administrative centre) by road. Novaya is the nearest rural locality.
