= Arkhangelskoye, Starooskolsky District, Belgorod Oblast =

Arkhangelskoye Архангельское
- Selo
- Location within Belgorod Oblast Location within Russia
- Coordinates: 51°15′N 38°06′E
- Country: Russia
- Region: Belgorod Oblast
- District: Starooskolsky District
- Time zone: UTC+3:00

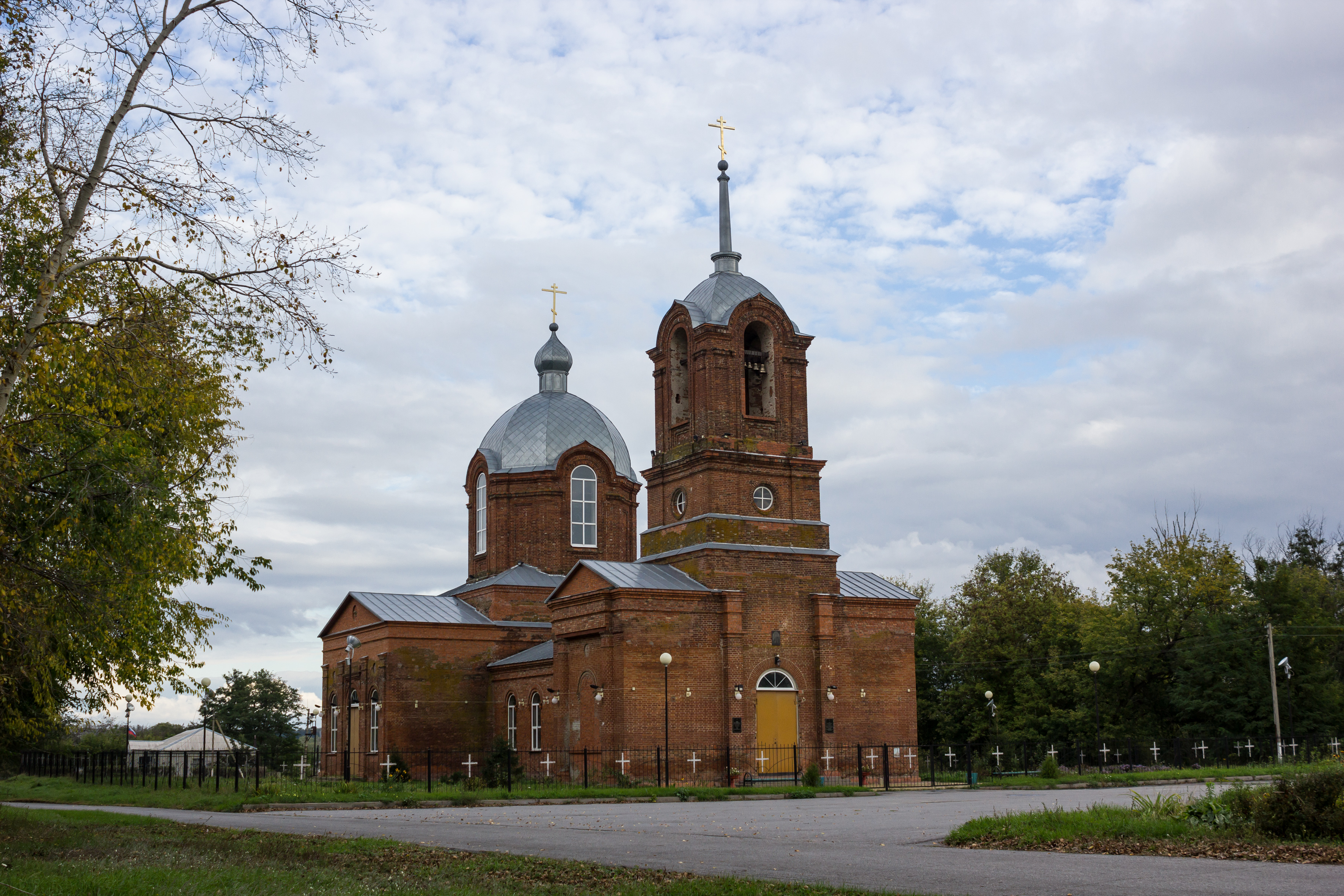
Church of St. Michael the Archangel (Belgorod Oblast, Stary Oskol, Arkhangelskoye village)

Arkhangelskoye (Russian: Архангельское) is a rural locality (a selo) and the administrative center of Arkhangelskoye Rural Settlement, Starooskolsky District, Belgorod Oblast, Russia. The population was 963 as of 2010. There are 21 streets.

== Geography ==
Arkhangelskoye is located 24 km southeast of Stary Oskol (the district's administrative centre) by road. Khoroshilovo is the nearest rural locality.
