= Arkhangelskoye, Khokholsky District, Voronezh Oblast =

Arkhangelskoye Архангельское
- Selo
- Location within Voronezh Oblast Location within Russia
- Coordinates: 51°15′N 39°08′E
- Country: Russia
- Region: Voronezh Oblast
- District: Khokholsky District
- Time zone: UTC+3:00

Arkhangelskoye (Russian: Архангельское) is a rural locality (a selo) and the administrative center of Arkhangelskoye Rural Settlement, Khokholsky District, Voronezh Oblast, Russia. The population was 509 as of 2010. There are 14 streets.

== Geography ==
Arkhangelskoye is located 54 km southeast of Khokholsky (the district's administrative centre) by road. Novovoronezh is the nearest rural locality.
