= Yusva =

Rural locality in Perm Krai, Russia

Coordinates: 58°57′55″N 54°57′35″E

Yusva (Russian: Юсьва, Komi-Permyak: Юрла) is a rural locality (a selo) and the administrative center of Yusvinsky District, Komi-Permyak Okrug, Perm Krai, Russia. Population: 4,679 (2010 census); 4,741 (2002 census); 3,497 (1989 Soviet census).
