= Yusvinsky District =

Yusvinsky District Юсьвинский район (Russian)
- District
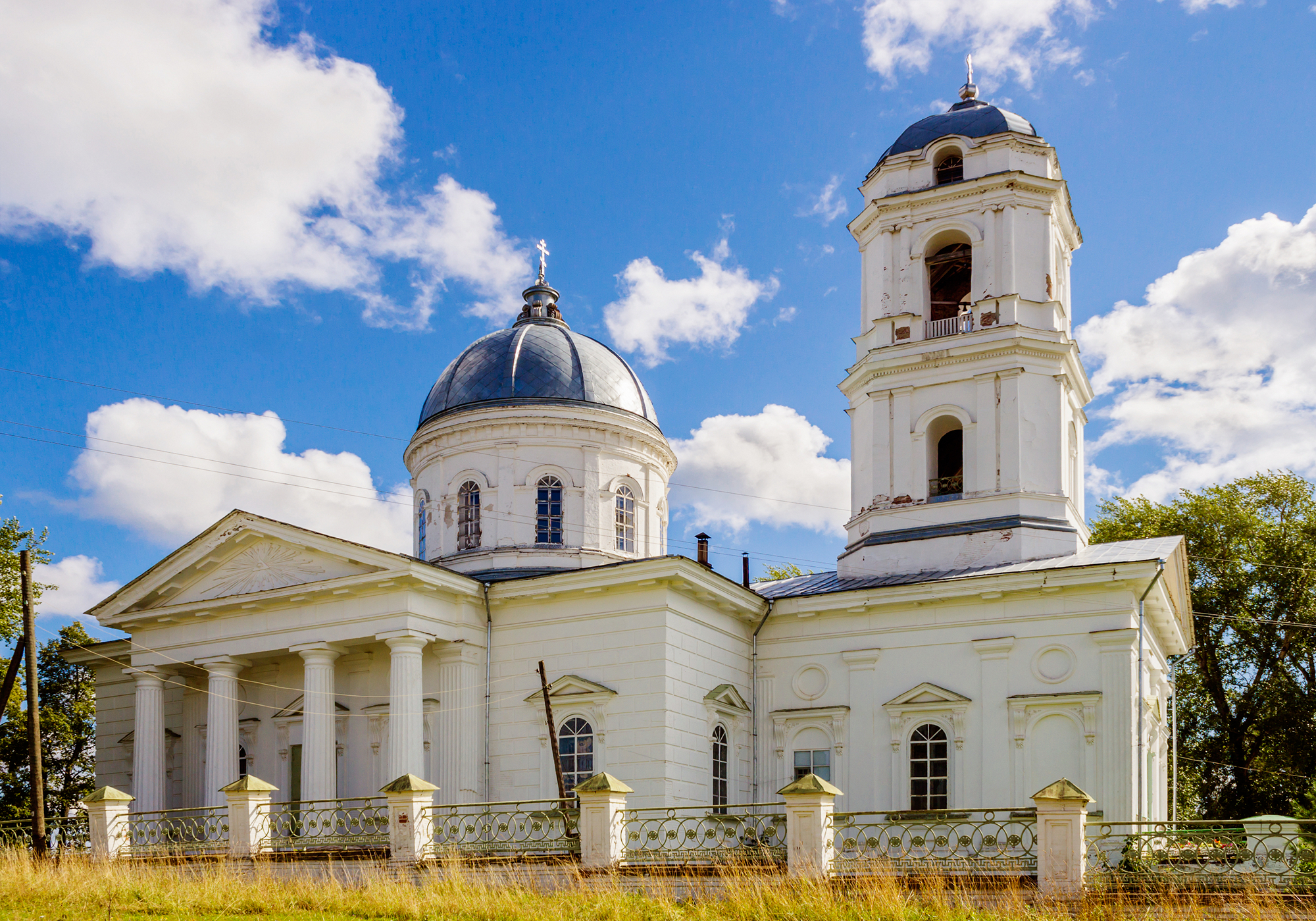
- Church in Pozhva, Yusvinsky District

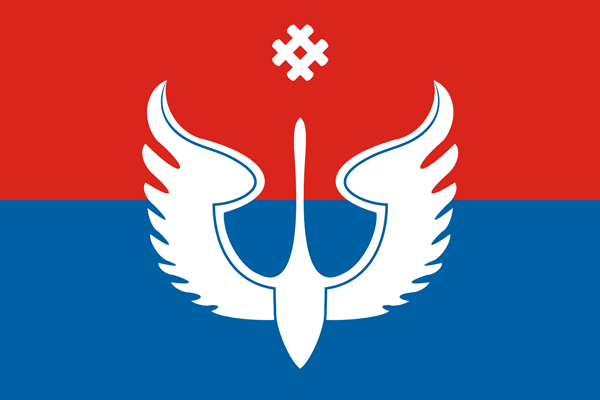
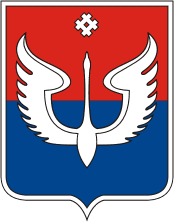
- Flag Coat of arms
- Location of Yusvinsky District in Komi-Permyak Okrug, Perm Krai
- Coordinates: 59.067°N 55.499°E
- Country: Russia
- Federal subject: Perm Krai
- Established: February 25, 1925
- Administrative center: Yusva

Area
  - Total: 3,100 km^{2} (1,200 sq mi)

Population (2010 Census)
  - Total: 19,558
  - Density: 6.3/km^{2} (16/sq mi)
  - Urban: 0%
  - Rural: 100%

Administrative structure
  - Inhabited localities: 148 rural localities

Municipal structure
  - Municipally incorporated as: Yusvinsky Municipal District
  - Municipal divisions: 0 urban settlements, 5 rural settlements
- Time zone: UTC+5 (MSK+2)
- OKTMO ID: 57827000
- Website: http://www.admuswa.ru/

Yusvinsky District (Russian: Ю́сьвинский райо́н) is an administrative district (raion) of Komi-Permyak Okrug of Perm Krai, Russia; one of the thirty-three in the krai. Municipally, it is incorporated as Yusvinsky Municipal District. It is located in the center of the krai. The area of the district is 3,100 square kilometers (1,200 sq mi). Its administrative center is the rural locality (a selo) of Yusva. Population: 19,558 (2010 census); 23,724 (2002 census); 28,677 (1989 Soviet census). The population of Yusva accounts for 23.9% of the district's total population.

== Geography ==
About 70% of the district's territory is covered by forests.

== History ==
The district was established on February 25, 1925.

== Demographics ==
Ethnic composition (as of the 2002 Census):

- Komi-Permyak people: 54.3%
- Russians: 43.2%

== Economy ==
The economy of the district is based on agriculture and forestry.

== See also ==
- Zhiginovo

== Sources ==
- Законодательное собрание Пермской области. Закон №416-67 от 28 февраля 1996 г. «Об административно-территориальном устройстве Пермского края», в ред. Закона №504-ПК от 9 июля 2015 г. «О внесении изменений в Закон Пермской области "Об административно-территориальном устройстве Пермского края"». Вступил в силу с момента опубликования. Опубликован: "Звезда", №38, 12 марта 1996 г. (Legislative Assembly of Perm Oblast. Law #416-67 of February 28, 1996 On the Administrative-Territorial Structure of Perm Krai, as amended by the Law #504-PK of July 9, 2015 On Amending the Law of Perm Oblast "On the Administrative-Territorial Structure of Perm Krai". Effective as of the moment of publication.).
- Законодательное собрание Коми-Пермяцкого автономного округа. Закон №64 от 19 ноября 2004 г. «Об утверждении границ и о наделении статусом муниципальных образований Юсьвинского района Пермского края», в ред. Закона №273-ПК от 14 декабря 2013 г. «О внесении изменений в отдельные Законы Пермской области, Коми-Пермяцкого автономного округа, Пермского края». Вступил в силу через 10 дней со дня официального опубликования. Опубликован: "Парма", №238–239, 30 ноября 2004 г. (Legislative Assembly of Komi-Permyak Autonomous Okrug. Law #64 of November 19, 2004 On Establishing the Borders and on Granting the Status to the Municipal Formations of Yusvinsky District of Perm Krai, as amended by the Law #273-PK of December 14, 2013 On Amending Various Laws of Perm Oblast, Komi-Permyak Autonomous Okrug, Perm Krai. Effective as of the day which is 10 days following the day of the official publication.).
