= Anna, Voronezh Oblast =

Anna Анна
- Work settlement
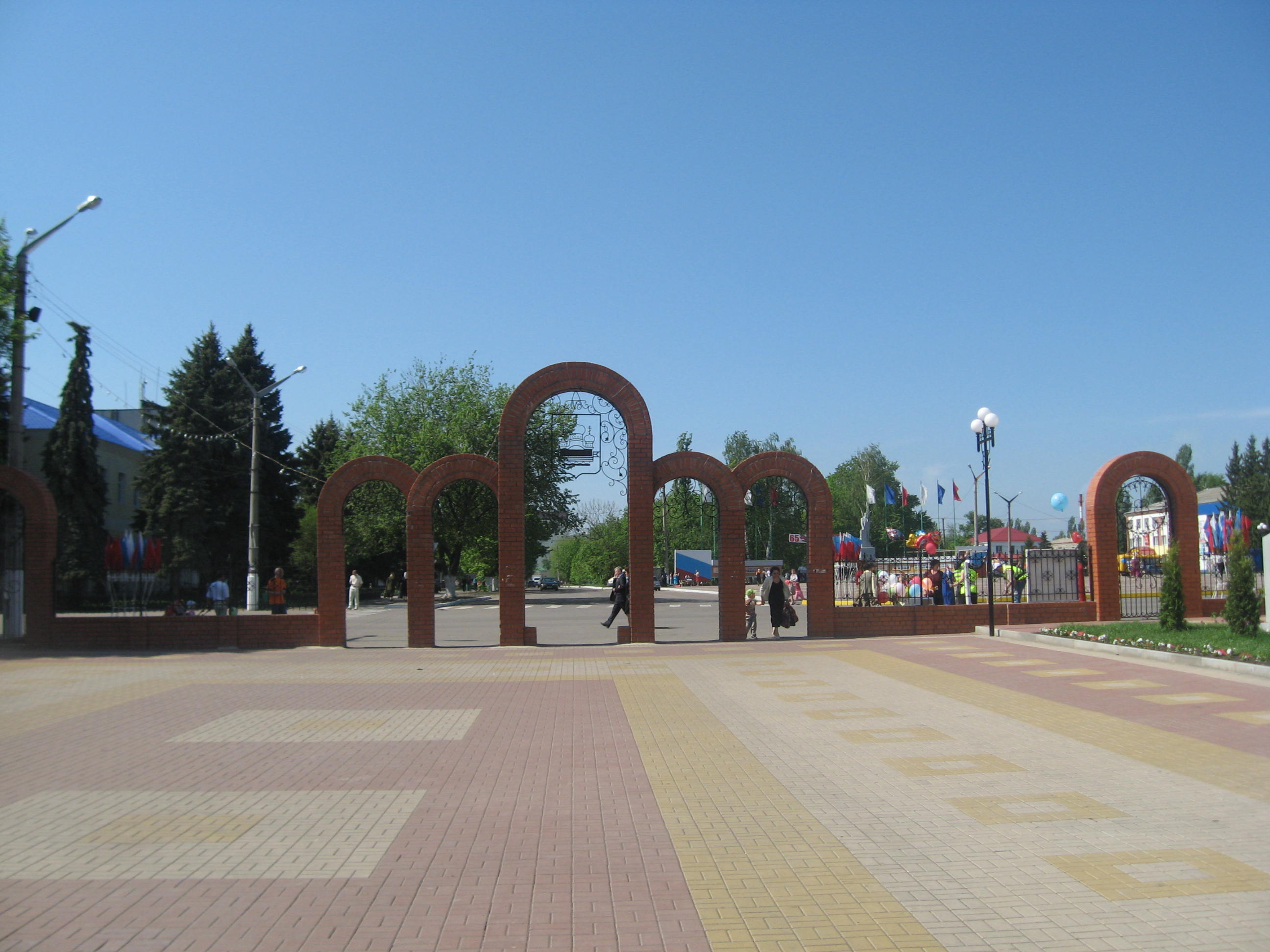

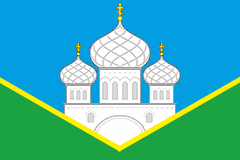
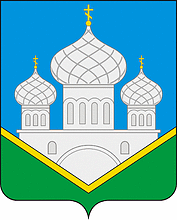
- Flag Coat of arms
- Interactive map of Anna
- Location of Anna Anna (Voronezh Oblast)
- Coordinates: 51°29′21″N 40°25′21″E
- Country: Russia
- Federal subject: Voronezh Oblast
- Administrative district: Anninsky District
- Founded: 1698
- Elevation: 148 m (486 ft)

Population (2010 Census)
  - Total: 18,032
  - Estimate (2025): 14,597 (−19%)

Administrative status
  - Capital of: Anninsky District

Municipal status
  - Municipal district: Anninsky Municipal District
  - Urban settlement: Anninskoye Urban Settlement
  - Capital of: Anninsky Municipal District, Anninskoye Urban Settlement
- Time zone: UTC+3 (MSK)
- Postal code: 396250–396254
- OKTMO ID: 20602151051

Anna (Russian: Анна) is an urban locality (urban-type settlement) and the administrative center of Anninsky District of Voronezh Oblast, Russia. Population: 15,316 (2021 census); 18,032 (2010 census); 19,416 (2002 census); 19,080 (1989 Soviet census).
