= Anninsky District =

Anninsky District Аннинский район (Russian)
- District
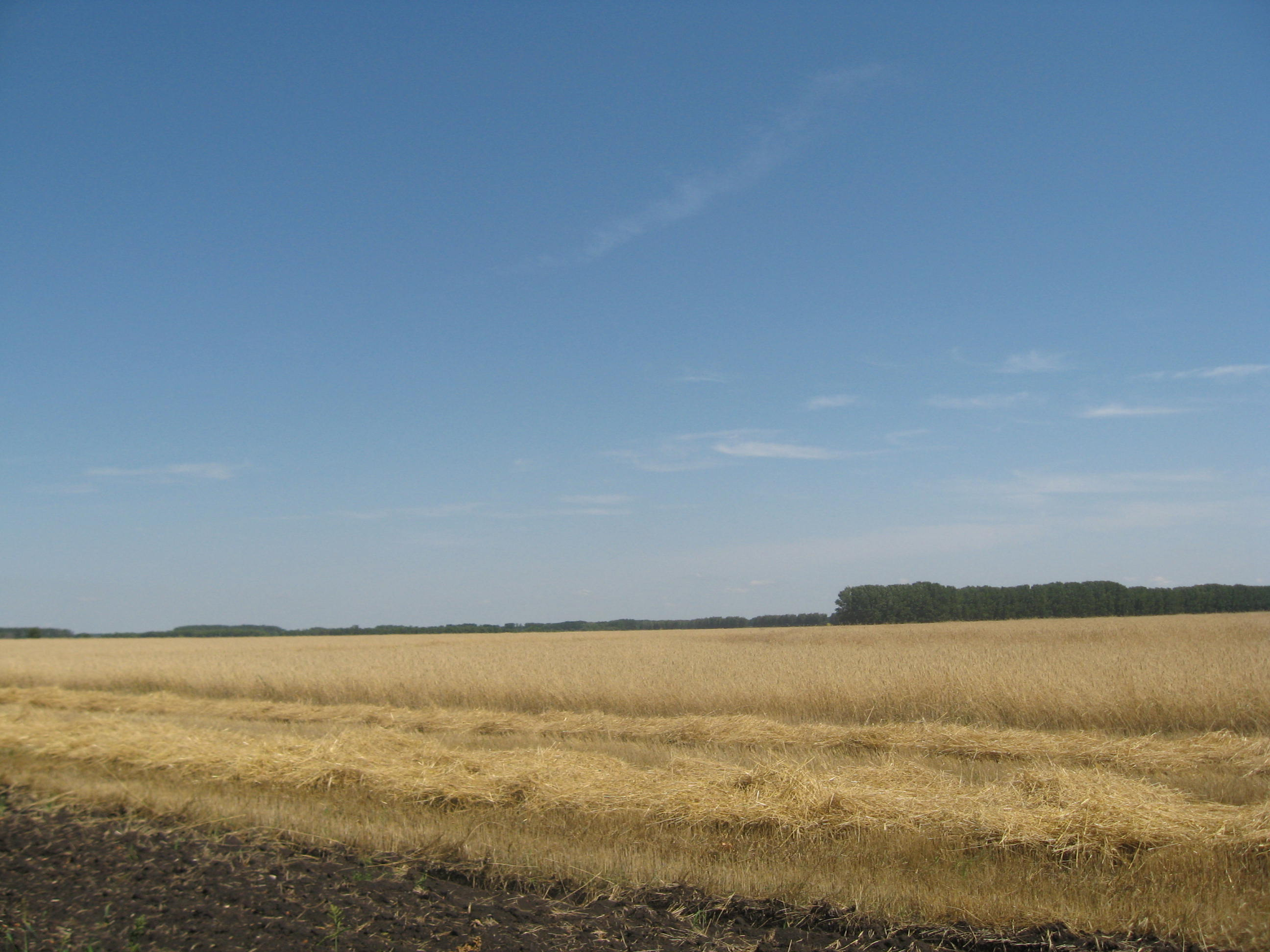
- Fields in Anninsky District

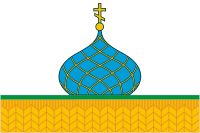
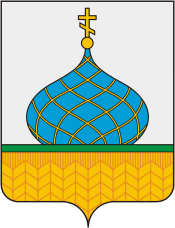
- Flag Coat of arms
- Location of Anninsky District in Voronezh Oblast
- Coordinates: 51°29′N 40°25′E
- Country: Russia
- Federal subject: Voronezh Oblast
- Established: 1928
- Administrative center: Anna

Area
  - Total: 2,098 km^{2} (810 sq mi)

Population (2010 Census)
  - Total: 45,385
  - Density: 21.63/km^{2} (56.03/sq mi)
  - Urban: 39.7%
  - Rural: 60.3%

Administrative structure
  - Administrative divisions: 1 Urban settlements, 22 Rural settlements
  - Inhabited localities: 1 urban-type settlements, 64 rural localities

Municipal structure
  - Municipally incorporated as: Anninsky Municipal District
  - Municipal divisions: 1 urban settlements, 22 rural settlements
- Time zone: UTC+3 (MSK)
- OKTMO ID: 20602000
- Website: http://www.annaraionadm.ru/

Anninsky District (Russian: А́ннинский райо́н) is an administrative and municipal district (raion), one of the thirty-two in Voronezh Oblast, Russia. It is located in the north of the oblast. The area of the district is 2,098 square kilometers (810 sq mi). Its administrative center is the urban locality (an urban-type settlement) of Anna. Population: 36,149 (2021 census); 45,385 (2010 census); 52,747 (2002 census); 56,617 (1989 Soviet census). The population of Anna accounts for 42.4% of the district's total population.
