= 206th Rifle Division =

206th Rifle Division (March 14, 1941 - December 27, 1941) 206th Rifle Division (December 26, 1941 - June 20, 1946)
- Active: 1941–1946
- Country: Soviet Union
- Branch: Red Army
- Type: Infantry
- Size: Division
- Engagements: Operation Barbarossa; Battle of Kiev (1941); Ostrogozhsk–Rossosh Offensive; Voronezh–Kastornoye Offensive; Battle of Kursk; Belgorod-Kharkov Offensive Operation; Battle of the Dniepr; Korsun-Shevchenkovsky Offensive; Uman–Botoșani Offensive; First Jassy–Kishinev Offensive; First Battle of Târgu Frumos; Second Battle of Târgu Frumos; Second Jassy-Kishinev Offensive; Budapest Offensive; Vienna Offensive
- Decorations: Order of the Red Banner (2nd Formation); Order of Suvorov (2nd Formation); Order of Kutuzov (2nd Formation); Order of Bogdan Khmelnitsky (2nd Formation)
- Battle honours: Korsun (2nd Formation)

Commanders
- Notable commanders: Col. Sergei Ilich Gorshkov; Maj. Gen. Aleksandr Nikiforovich Chernikov; Col. Fyodor Mikhailovich Kishkin-Ivanenko; Col. Nikolai Ivanovich Ivanov; Col. Samuil Ilich Tsukarev; Col. Viktor Ivanovich Rutko; Col. Nikolai Mikhailovich Ivanovskii; Col. Vladimir Pavlovich Kolesnikov; Col. Aleksei Maksimovich Abramov; Col. Fyodor Ivanovich Dremenkov

The 206th Rifle Division was twice formed as an infantry division of the Red Army, first as part of the prewar buildup of forces. Its first formation in March 1941 was based on the last prewar shtat (table of organization and equipment) for rifle divisions. When the German invasion began it was still organizing well away from the front near Krivoi Rog but was soon sent to the Kiev Fortified Sector where it eventually came under command of the 37th Army. It was deeply encircled by the German offensive in September and destroyed, but not officially stricken from the Soviet order of battle until late December.

At that time a new division was forming which was soon redesignated as the 206th, based on the shtat of December 6. It spent the first half of 1942 forming up and was still not fully equipped when it was sent to the front as part of 40th Army in Voronezh Front. It saw its first action in the Ostrogozhsk–Rossosh Offensive and shortly after in the Voronezh–Kastornoye Offensive, as part of 38th Army, helping to defeat and drive the Axis forces west from the territory that became the Kursk salient. The 206th was on a mostly quiet sector in 40th Army during the Battle of Kursk but then joined the 1943 summer offensive in eastern Ukraine as part of 40th and later 47th Army. In October it was reassigned to the 27th Army, where it remained for the duration of the war. During the winter and spring of 1943/44 the 206th took part in the fighting along the Dniepr and into western Ukraine and, remarkably, was awarded a battle honor and three decorations during just over two months; it also lost two commanders killed or died of wounds between the end of December and the beginning of May. The division, now in 2nd Ukrainian Front, saw heavy fighting in the Târgu Frumos area of Romania during April and May 1944. By mid-summer the vast majority of its personnel were of Kazakh nationality. The 206th then took part in the offensive that drove Romania out of the Axis in August and continued its advance into the Balkans, including the campaigns for Transylvania and eastern Hungary, and ended the war in the 33rd Rifle Corps of 27th Army, now in 3rd Ukrainian Front, advancing into western Austria. This highly distinguished division continued its service into mid-1946, but was then disbanded.

== 1st Formation ==
The 206th Rifle Division began forming for the first time on March 14, 1941 at Pavlograd in the Odessa Military District. As of June 22 it was still in that District and its order of battle was as follows:

- 722nd Rifle Regiment
- 737th Rifle Regiment
- 748th Rifle Regiment
- 661st Artillery Regiment
- 714th Howitzer Artillery Regiment
- 35th Antitank Battalion
- 407th Antiaircraft Battalion
- 286th Reconnaissance Battalion
- 374th Sapper Battalion
- 586th Signal Battalion
- 361st Medical/Sanitation Battalion
- 306th Anti-gas Detachment
- 679th Motor Transport Battalion
- 467th Field Bakery
- 358th Field Postal Station
- 40th Field Office of the State Bank

Col. Sergei Ilich Gorshkov took command of the division on the day it began forming, and would remain in command through the entire 1st Formation. On June 22, 1941 it was still in the Odessa District, subordinated to the 7th Rifle Corps along with the 116th and 196th Rifle Divisions. During the next few days the Corps was transferred to the Southwestern Front and sent to the northwest. By July 8 it was fighting near Novograd-Volynskii and later that month the 206th was one of the first units assigned to the Kiev Fortified Sector covering the immediate approaches to the city from the west. The units of the fortified sector were redesignated as the 37th Army in August.

On August 25 the German 2nd Panzer Group began its advance to the south with the objective of linking up with 1st Panzer Group and surrounding most of Southwestern Front. By September 9 it was making rapid progress but Stalin refused to give Col. Gen. M. P. Kirponos permission to pull back from Kiev. On September 15 the German pincers met at Lokhvitsa. The 206th, along with the rest of 37th Army, was deeply encircled and forced to give up Kiev on September 19. The bulk of the division was destroyed the next day but a small group led by Colonel Gorshkov managed to escape, along with another led by the divisional chief of staff, Lt. Col. P. I. Kulizhski, in late October. Gorshkov would go on to be promoted to the rank of lieutenant general and commanded the 5th Guards Cavalry Corps in the last year of the war. The division was not officially removed from the Red Army's order of battle until December 27.

== 2nd Formation ==
The 206th began forming again on December 26, 1942 based on the 428th Rifle Division at Buguruslan in the South Urals Military District. Its order of battle was similar to that of the 1st formation:

- 722nd Rifle Regiment
- 737th Rifle Regiment
- 748th Rifle Regiment
- 661st Artillery Regiment
- 35th Antitank Battalion
- 122nd (later 89th) Antiaircraft Battery (until April 20, 1943)
- 286th Reconnaissance Company
- 374th Sapper Battalion
- 586th Signal Battalion (later, 664th Signal Company)
- 361st Medical/Sanitation Battalion
- 508th Chemical Defense (Anti-gas) Company
- 244th Motor Transport Company
- 427th Field Bakery
- 892nd Divisional Veterinary Hospital
- 1680th Field Postal Station
- 1083rd Field Office of the State Bank

Maj. Gen. Aleksandr Nikiforovich Chernikov was assigned to command of the division on the day it began forming, but in mid-April he handed it over to Col. Fyodor Mikhailovich Kishkin-Ivanenko. In May it was assigned to the 3rd Reserve Army in the Reserve of the Supreme High Command and then in June to the 6th Reserve Army. In July the division was assigned to the 40th Army in Voronezh Front; at this time the 737th Rifle Regiment was under the command of Maj. Spiridon Mikhailovich Egorov, who had been made a Hero of the Soviet Union following the Winter War against Finland in 1940. After six months of forming-up, the division was still lacking crucial heavy weapons; it had only 12 of its authorized 18 120 mm mortars while the 661st Artillery Regiment was short two of its 76 mm guns and had no 122 mm howitzers at all. By the time it arrived, the main fighting had mostly moved farther east and the 206th remained on the defensive along the upper Don River and the city of Voronezh through the rest of the year.

=== Ostrogozhsk–Rossosh Offensive ===
On December 31 Colonel Ivanov handed his command over to Col. Samuil Ilich Tsukarev. At this time the division was in the 60th Army of Voronezh Front. On January 13 the left-wing and center forces of the Front began the Ostrogozhsk–Rossosh offensive operation against the 2nd Hungarian Army and part of the 8th Italian Army. 60th Army consisted of the 100th, 121st, 206th, 232nd and 303rd Rifle Divisions and the 104th Rifle Brigade. Each division had between 5,000-6,000 personnel on strength. By January 19 the Axis Ostrogozhsk–Rossosh group of forces had been encircled and the Army was defending along a 60 km line from Olkhovatka to Voronezh to Kremenchug, facing the German 88th, 323rd (minus one regiment) and 75th Infantry Divisions.

=== Voronezh–Kastornoye Offensive ===
In a regrouping that took place before the start of the next offensive the 206th was transferred to the 38th Army, still in Voronezh Front. The intention was to encircle and destroy the Axis forces in the area of Voronezh and Kastornoye and subsequently develop the offensive directly on Kursk and Kharkov. Instructions to prepare and conduct the operation were issued by the STAVKA on January 20 and it was to involve the 40th, 60th and 38th Armies of Voronezh Front and the 13th Army of Bryansk Front. The first attack, scheduled for January 24, would involve the 40th and 13th Armies, which had the shortest distances to cover to meet up. 38th Army would attack second from the area of Terbuny. Its main forces would advance toward Nizhnyaya Veduga with one division on Kastornoye. Once the encirclement was made the secondary attacks by 38th and 60th Armies would split up and eliminate the isolated forces.

When the offensive began the command of German Army Group B correctly determined its intention and possibilities. Believing that the encirclement of its 2nd Army would only be a matter of several days, orders were given to the VII Army Corps to withdraw from Voronezh and across the Don. Reconnaissance by 60th Army discovered this movement and it began to pursue. By dawn on January 25 the city had been completely cleared. 38th Army's offensive began on January 25, moved up a day due to the German retreat from Voronezh. The attack did not begin until 1630 hours following a 30-minute artillery preparation on a 14 km sector from Kozinka to Ozerki. It had only 91 tanks (mostly in the 180th Tank Brigade) in support and no infantry reserves. The 206th was to attack toward Golosnovka and Zemlyansk to gain a line from the former village to Ilinovka by the end of the day to secure the left flank of the Army's shock group.

It wasn't until dawn on January 26, following another artillery preparation, that the 240th and 167th Rifle Divisions, forming the Army's shock group, began to make any progress. Heavy fighting continued until 1300 hours when resistance began to weaken and the Axis forces began to fall back to the south. One regiment of the 206th which was attached to the shock group fought throughout the day for the village of Ivanovka. During the day the combined force advanced up to 8 km. As the Axis withdrawal continued the 38th Army went over to the attack along its entire front on January 27. Col. Gen. F. I. Golikov, commander of Voronezh Front, ordered a change to the operational plan, sending all three divisions plus the 180th Tanks in the direction of Kastornoye. This led to an advance of 15 km during the day's fighting. The 206th reached as far as Malopokrovka and Ilinovka but was unable to seize these places. The next day the tank brigade reached Kastornoye in conjunction with mobile forces of the 13th and 40th Armies, followed by rifle units of the 13th Army and the shock group of the 38th, leading to a stubborn fight for the town into the morning of January 29; meanwhile the 206th reached a line from Milavka to Akulovo to Makhovatka. As a result of these advances the main escape routes of the Axis Voronezh-Kastornoye group of forces had been cut.

==== Battle for the Pocket ====
During the following days the 38th Army was to help complete the destruction of this grouping before beginning to advance on Kharkov at the beginning of February. By the end of January 29 the 206th had occupied Dolgushi and was continuing to attack towards Ploskoe. During the next day the division reached a line from Kotovka to Lozovka. By now there was a developing threat that significant Axis forces could escape from the encirclement because the 25th Guards Rifle Division of 40th Army was unable to hold a 30 km-wide front. Golikov ordered the 206th to move up to backstop the 25th Guards. During January 31 the division advanced to the southwest, reached Bykovo and was then subjected to counterattacks by Axis forces falling back on Yastrebovka. The division was forced to deploy along the line from Bykovo to Gologuzovka with its front facing to the southeast to repel breakout attempts to the west by Axis forces. Most of 38th Army's forces were now marching or preparing to march towards the Tim River.

On February 1 the Army's commander, Maj. Gen. N. E. Chibisov, was ordered to occupy the town of Tim with the 240th and 167th Divisions and to pull the 206th out of the fighting in the Bykovo area and move it up to a line from Yastrebovka to Teplyi Kolodez by the end of the day. However, there remained an Axis group of 30,000-35,000 men east of Gorshechnoye still attempting to break out of the encirclement and the 206th, along with four other rifle divisions and one brigade, were tied down in fighting with it. One of three independent break-out groups consisted of 6,000-8,000 men of the 57th, 68th and 323rd Infantry Divisions and beginning on February 2 sought to escape in the direction of Bogatyrevo. By the end of the 4th it had made progress and was engaged in stubborn fighting with the 206th along a line from that village to Bykovo as the division was reinforced by the 232nd Division. The next morning the German group attacked the 206th's right flank regiment and pushed it out of Bogatyrevo to the north, then continued to move towards Verkhnie Apochki where it was halted by a regiment of the 237th Rifle Division and the 253rd Rifle Brigade. By now Golikov had assigned 38th Army the task of completing the elimination of the encircled groupings. On February 6 the 206th and 129th Divisions and the 253rd Brigade received orders to pursue the retreating Axis forces towards Degtyarnaya and Shlyakhovaya, which actually amounted to pushing back rearguards; by the end of the day the division had reoccupied Bogatyrevo. The next day it captured Srednie Apochki and Nizhnyaya Kleshevka. During these two days the "mobile pocket" advanced from 15 km-30 km westward and was making a bid break out through Tim and Manturovo toward Oboyan.

During February 6–7 blizzard conditions had severely hampered the movement of men and supplies on both sides but also provided the Axis forces with cover from observation. This weather did not abate until February 10. During February 8 the 206th reached a road junction near Shlyakhovaya while the Axis forces pushed back units of the 237th and 232nd Divisions while not yet achieving a breakthrough. That day as well the 60th Army liberated Kursk and 40th Army reached Belgorod, which was cleared on February 9. On that day the main body of the "mobile pocket" made further advances against the positions of the 232nd and 167th Divisions. Fearing they might be encircled themselves the divisional commanders ordered their men to the north and southwest respectively, giving the Axis group a clear path to reach Manturovo and then Solntsevo. Advancing against rearguards once again the 206th reached Stuzhen.

With its breakout achieved the Axis group, which had abandoned nearly all its artillery and vehicles, continued its march on Oboyan. 38th Army scrambled to close the ring again but was hampered by the state of the roads which left the tanks and other vehicles without fuel and the troops with little food or ammunition. By the end of February 10 the 206th had occupied Pokrovka and reached the area from Krutye Verkhi to Aleksandrovka to Height 248 where it seized part of the abandoned Axis equipment. On the night of February 12/13 the 240th Division cut the retreat route of one of the three original breakout groups, which was almost completely destroyed. At about the same time the 206th occupied Troitskoe and Ukolovo. Meanwhile, most of the remainder of the Axis forces reached Oboyan where they prepared to defend. General Chibisov now ordered his forces to encircle and destroy the Axis garrison of that town in preparation for a renewed offensive on Sumy, 100 km to the southwest. By the end of February 16 the 206th reached Krasnyi Pochinok and Korovino. By this date Oboyan was already partly encircled by three rifle divisions, including the 206th, and a brigade. Chibisov planned to take the town in an attack from three sides on February 18 but on the day before, anticipating the attack, the Axis garrison staged a hasty retreat. In the end only a few thousand men of the original encircled Axis force managed to escape.

== Battle of Kursk ==
German plan of attack at Kursk. The position of 40th Army is shown in the center of the south face of the salient.

Before the end of the month the division was transferred back to the 40th Army. By now Army Group South was well into its counteroffensive and by March 17 the Army was threatened with encirclement between Sumy and Belgorod. Under the circumstances 40th Army had little option but to retreat, giving up Belgorod in the process. The German offensive shut down shortly thereafter. Colonel Tsukarev handed his command over to Lt. Col. Viktor Ivanovich Rutko on May 11; this officer would be promoted to the rank of colonel on June 18. In early May the STAVKA made its decision to stand on the defensive within the Kursk salient which was occupied by the Central and Voronezh Fronts. The new commander of the latter, Army Gen. N. F. Vatutin, reported as follows on May 11:

The forces of the Voronezh Front are ready to carry out their defensive assignments. All of the rifle divisions of the 38th, 40th, 6th Guards and 7th Guards Armies, with very few exceptions, each have 8,000 or more men... The main portion of arms has arrived by railroad in the last few days. Thus the bulk of the weapons will be issued to the troops by the end of 14.5.1943.

40th Army, commanded by Lt. Gen. K. S. Moskalenko, was assigned a front 50 km wide between 38th and 6th Guards Armies. At the outset of the battle the 206th was in the first echelon with the 217th, 219th and 100th Rifle Divisions. It was due to become part of the 47th Rifle Corps but this did not occur until after the German offensive began.

The division was on the right (west) flank of the Army adjacent to its former 38th Army. It manned, apart from other defenses, an antitank strongpoint consisting of 16 guns of 45 mm and 76 mm calibre and nine antitank rifles. In the event, since the main attack of the 4th Panzer Army fell on the positions of the 6th and 7th Guards Armies to the east the 40th Army saw little action during Operation Zitadelle; on July 7 Vatutin sent Moskalenko a warning order for a flank attack towards Tomarovka, but this was soon revised to a transfer of most of 40th Army's armor and heavy artillery to bolster 6th Guards and 1st Tank Armies and a feint attack in support. Little of this affected the 206th on the opposite flank.

=== Belgorod-Kharkov Offensive Operation ===
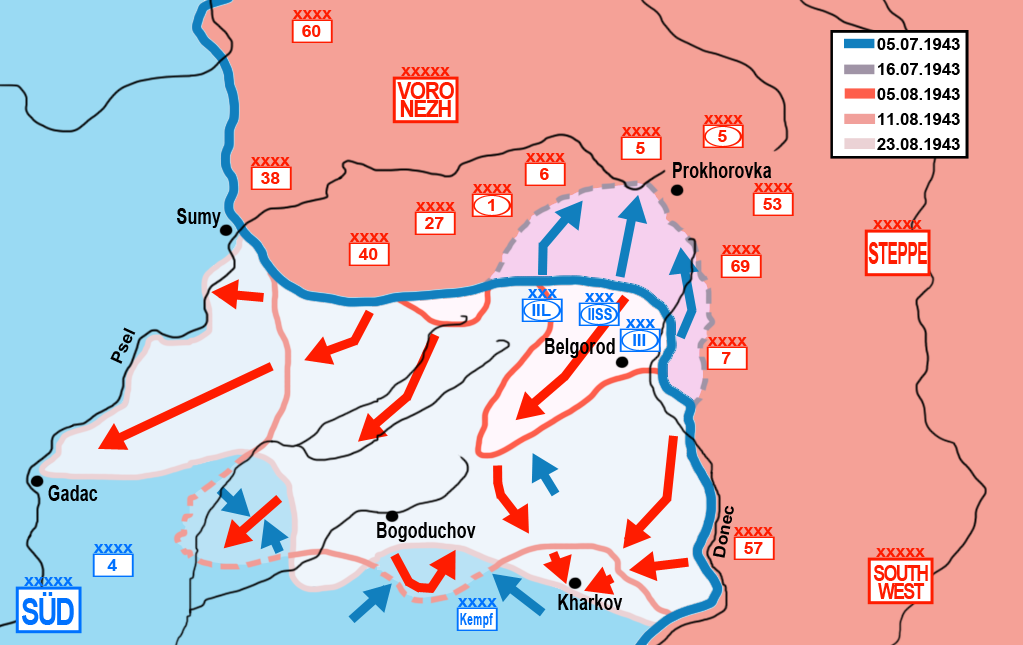
Belgorod-Kharkov Offensive Operation. Note direction of advance of 40th Army.

After the German offensive came to a halt in mid-July the STAVKA made its long-delayed plans for its own summer offensive. Voronezh and Steppe Fronts would attack to regain Belgorod and then push towards Kharkov and the Dniepr River. 40th Army was to attack with its shock group, consisting of the 206th and 100th Divisions of 47th Corps, the 2nd Tank Corps, a Guards heavy tank regiment, and a large number of supporting antitank, artillery and mortar units. This group deployed along an 8 km front between Vysokii and Kresanov to break through the German defense on the sector from Terebreno to Lipovye Balki and attack along the Vorsklitsa River to secure the flank of the 27th Army.

The overall offensive began on August 3 but did not involve 27th and 40th Armies until August 5. The 40th's shock group attacked at 0715 hours, following a two-hour artillery preparation against the positions of the German 57th Infantry Division, which had been severely damaged in the Kastornoye pocket months before. Its resistance was soon crushed; the two Soviet armies broke through along a 26 km-wide sector and by the end of the day had advanced from 8 km to 12 km, reaching a line from Starosele to Kasilovo to Ivanovskaya Lisitsa to Nikitskoye despite counterattacks by 11th Panzer Division which were beaten off. What remained of the 57th Infantry pulled back to Tomarovka.

Following this success 40th Army was ordered to advance in the direction of Trostyanets with 47th Army, still in Front reserve, coming up behind. On August 6, 40th Army's shock group fought against the 323rd Infantry Division in the Dorogoshch area. It quickly broke the German defenses and began rolling them up towards the west, reaching a line from Krasnopole to Popovka to Slavgorodok. Army Group South now committed the 7th Panzer and Großdeutschland Divisions in an attempt to stop the 40th and 27th Armies. During August 8–11 40th Army attacked towards Boromlya. On the first day it pushed aside remnants of 11th Panzer, as well as 57th and 323rd Infantry, and took the area around Zhigaylovka by the end of the day. By August 9 it was facing increasing resistance; its right flank units advanced 4–5km and captured a German stronghold at Chernetchina. Meanwhile, the 10th Tank Corps, operating in cooperation with the Army, broke through the German defense, covered 20 km, and seized Trostyanets.

On August 10 the 40th Army advanced another 10–12km and captured Grebennikovka and Boromlya. Its left flank units were engaged in stubborn fighting in Trostyanets, beating back counterattacks by Großdeutschland well into the next day, when Maj. Gen. Serafim Petrovich Merkulov took over command of the 206th from Colonel Rutko. During August 12–16 the 38th and 40th Armies were fighting along a line from Verkhnyaya Syrovatka to Trostyanets and were unable to advance. The offensive was renewed on the morning of August 17 with the commitment of 47th Army from the reserve; the division was transferred to that Army on the same day. Following a 50-minute artillery and air bombardment the combined forces of the three Armies broke through the German defense and advanced 10–12 km, reaching a line from Bezdrik to Velikii Istorop. The next day 47th Army advanced another 20 km, after which it was ordered to cut the road from Lebedyn to Akhtyrka to help isolate the group of German forces massed around the latter place. This was accomplished on August 19.

The 47th and part of 40th Army engaged in heavy fighting on August 20 with German forces transferred from Akhtyrka and made a further advance of between 5 and 10 km. This cut the last road to that town from the west. The next day the 47th resumed the offensive with the goal of enveloping the Akhtyrka area from the west and southwest. While the German force there evaded encirclement, over the next three days it was defeated and Akhtyrka was liberated. By the end of August 27 the right-flank armies of Voronezh Front had reached the Psel River and a line to the south as far as Kotelva. From here the Front was to undertake a new offensive to the west toward Gadyach and to the south toward Poltava.

== Into Ukraine ==
As of September 1 the 206th was subordinated to the 21st Rifle Corps in 47th Army, along with the 218th Rifle Division. As the advance towards the Dniepr continued, on September 17 General Merkulov was given command of the 47th Rifle Corps; two days later he handed his command of the 206th to his chief of staff, Lt. Col. Luka Minovich Dudka, who held it for one day before being replaced by Col. Nikolai Mikhailovich Ivanovskii. By the end of September 22 the 47th Army reached a line from Chepilki to Ashanovka with the 206th as one of the divisions in the lead, but had lost contact with the German forces covering their crossing of the Dniepr in the Kanev area.

That night the first soldiers of 3rd Guards Tank Army crossed the river near Bukrin, establishing a bridgehead that would be the focus of considerable fighting over the following weeks. Days later the 21st Corps captured two insignificant shoreline sectors southeast of Kanev. By October 12 it had been moved, with the rest of 47th Army, to another bridgehead at Studenets. On that date the Voronezh Front (soon redesignated as 1st Ukrainian Front) made its first attempt to break out of the Bukrin bridgehead and 47th Army was to secure the left flank of the Front's shock group. 21st Corps was deployed on the right flank of the bridgehead with both the 206th and 218th Divisions in the first echelon. In the event neither this attack nor a further effort on October 21 had any success largely due to a lack of bridging material to allow heavy artillery to cross to the bridgehead. The STAVKA now switched its attention to another bridgehead at Lyutezh, north of Kiev. This led to a considerable regrouping of the Front's forces in the course of which the 206th, which was left holding the Studenets bridgehead, was transferred as a separate division to Lt. Gen. S. G. Trofimenko's 27th Army. It would remain in this Army for the duration of the war.

During the fighting for the Bukrin bridgehead Sen. Lt. Aleksandr Aleksandrovich Kotov, the commander of a battery of 76 mm guns of the 661st Artillery Regiment, repeatedly distinguished himself in action. His battery was one of the first from the regiment to cross the Dniepr and immediately began providing direct fire support to the infantry. During the fighting for Hill 243.2 from October 2–24 he directed his guns in repelling eight German counterattacks, destroying more than 150 enemy troops, three mortar and two artillery batteries, plus three tripod-mounted and two bipod-mounted machine guns. He then led the establishment of an observation post on the height. On March 6, 1944, Lieutenant Kotov, who had previously won the medal "For Courage", the Order of the Red Star and the Order of the Patriotic War, 2nd Degree, was made a Hero of the Soviet Union. In early 1945 he was transferred to the 11th Artillery Division with the rank of captain; he survived the war, returned to teaching, and died in 1988 in Bataysk, where he was buried.

As winter weather approached the division organized its own ski battalion to serve as a mobile reserve but in late December this was re-formed as the 3rd rifle battalion for the 722nd Regiment, whose original 3rd Battalion had been disbanded due to heavy losses. On December 31, while personally assigning combat missions to the commander of this regiment and his battalion commanders only 400 m from the forward edge of the German lines, Colonel Ivanovskii was killed by a sniper. The attack he had been directing went ahead but only gained 100-200m due to heavy German fire. On January 17, 1944 Ivanovskii was posthumously promoted to the rank of major general. During the first three weeks of January the division was commanded by Lt. Col. Nikolai Andreevich Ivanchenko but on the 22nd it was taken over by Col. Vladimir Pavlovich Kolesnikov.

In a report to 27th Army on January 6 the division gave its weapons strength as follows: rifles: 1,300; submachine guns: 750; heavy machine guns: 54; light machine guns: 245; 50 mm mortars: 2; 82 mm mortars: 41; 105 mm and 120 mm mortars: 14; antitank rifles: 69; antitank guns: 31; 76 mm guns: 28; 105 mm guns: 12.

=== Into Western Ukraine ===
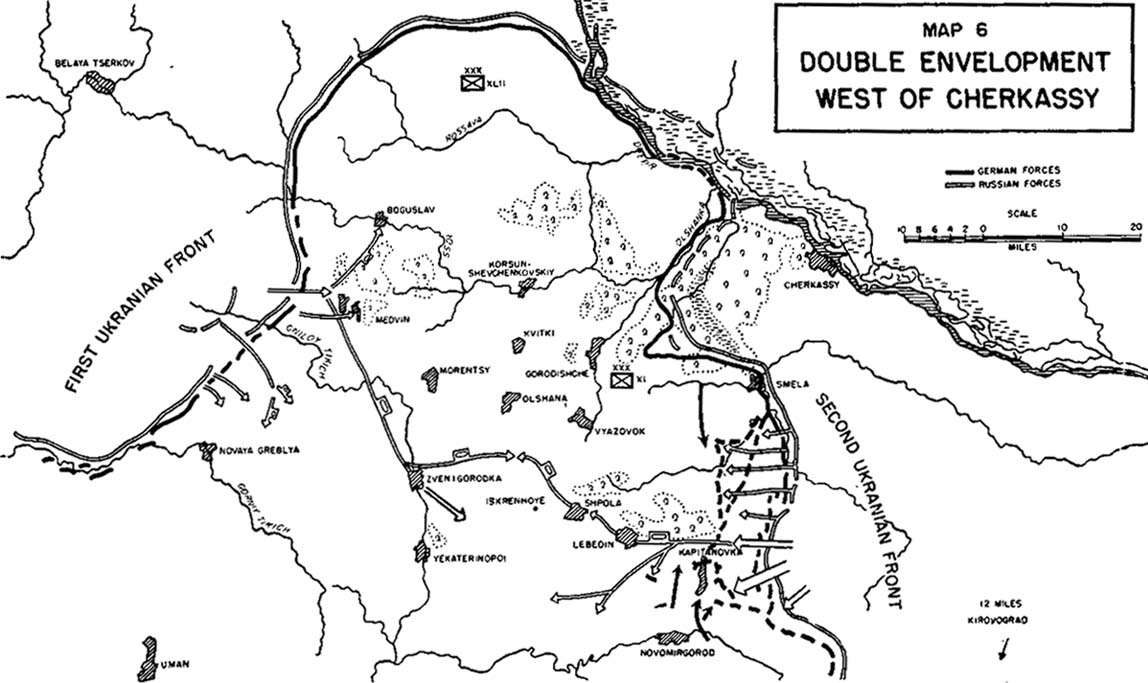
Formation of the Korsun-Shevchenkovskii (Cherkassy) Pocket

At this time the 27th Army was on the left (south) flank of 1st Ukrainian Front. On January 26 a mechanized corps and a Guards tank corps of the Front penetrated the right flank of 1st Panzer Army and began driving south. Meanwhile, a reconnaissance-in-force by 2nd Ukrainian Front against German 8th Army had found a weak point between Cherkassy and Kirovograd which was soon penetrated and exploited by 4th Guards and 6th Tank Armies. On the afternoon of the 28th the forces of the two fronts met at Shpola, encircling the 56,000 troops of XI and XXXXII Army Corps. During the first half of February two German panzer corps made desperate efforts to break through to the pocket while the encircling forces, including 27th Army, did their best to reduce it. On February 16 about 30,000 managed to escape, without any vehicles or heavy equipment. Two days later the 206th was granted an honorific for its part in the battle:

KORSUN... 206th Rifle Division (Colonel Kolesnikov, Vladimir Pavlovich)... The troops who participated in the liberation of Korsun-Shevchenkovskii, by the order of the Supreme High Command of 18 February 1944, and a commendation in Moscow, are given a salute of 20 artillery salvoes from 224 guns.

During the battle the 27th Army was transferred to 2nd Ukrainian Front and the division came under command of the 33rd Rifle Corps. Following this victory it took part in the Uman–Botoșani Offensive and on March 19 was awarded the Order of the Red Banner for its part in the liberation of the former city.

== Battles in Moldova ==
As the offensive continued towards Botoșani the 206th staged an assault crossing of the Dniestr River and took part in the capture of the city of Beltsy, for which it was decorated on April 8 with the Order of Suvorov, 2nd Degree. It was now part of the 35th Guards Rifle Corps. While the 52nd Army staged diversionary actions towards Iași, the shock group of the Front, including both Corps of 27th Army, thrust southward across the Prut River 16–60 km northwest of Iași. The initial mission was to reach the Târgu Frumos, Pașcani and Târgu Neamț regions and, ideally, to take those towns from their Romanian defenders by surprise. The advance was complicated by heavy terrain, multiple rivers and streams, and spring flooding. On April 24 the 206th would be further decorated with the Order of Kutuzov, 2nd Degree, for its successful forcing of the Prut.

=== First Battle of Târgu Frumos ===
The 232nd Rifle Division captured Botoșani on April 7, forcing part of the Romanian 8th Infantry Division southward toward Târgu Neamț. Meanwhile, to the east, the 3rd Guards Airborne Division also attacked to the south, driving the main forces of the Romanian division back towards the town of Hârlău, flanked by the 202nd and 206th Divisions. The next day the 206th drove the Romanian group out of Hârlău, which placed it just 27 km north of Târgu Frumos. All that separated the 27th Army from its objectives were the disorganized remnants of the Romanian 7th and 8th Divisions. By now, however, the Romanian 4th Army had managed to assemble enough forces to man the Strunga Defense Line from Târgu Neamț to just south of Iași.

35th Guards Corps resumed its advance towards Târgu Frumos at mid-morning on April 9 with the 202nd and 206th Divisions in the first echelon. The 206th quickly cleared the Romanian troops from the town and the adjacent region and dug into defensive positions to the southeast and southwest. Forward detachments of the 2nd Tank Army tried to reinforce the Corps but were unable to break contact with a battlegroup of the 24th Panzer Division north of Podu Iloaiei. The German 8th Army was already moving to counter the threat from 27th Army by moving the Großdeutschland Division from well east of Iași. During the afternoon this division's 52nd Assault Engineer Battalion launched a counterattack which managed to seize and hold a small foothold in the southern part of Târgu Frumos, but the 3rd Guards Airborne soon came up to reinforce the 206th. By nightfall the three Soviet divisions had carved a menacing salient 5–10 km deep into the Romanian defense south and southeast of the town and were anxiously awaiting the arrival of the main body on 2nd Tank Army which was struggling through virtually roadless and muddy terrain.

Early on April 10 Großdeutschland, which fielded 160 tanks including 40 Panthers and 40 Tigers, attacked westward along the road from Podu Iloaiei to Târgu Frumos in two columns on each side of the road. This was just as the 206th, 3rd Guards Airborne and 93rd Guards Rifle Divisions were preparing to resume their assault to the south so that only their rear elements remained behind in to town. The German attack tore these rear links and lines of communications apart. Their forward detachments were also struck by the Romanian 7th Infantry and 1st Guards Armored Divisions. The three divisions had no choice but to fight their way out of the developing trap; their only saving grace was that most of the motorized infantry of Großdeutschland had fallen behind leaving gaps between the tank groups that the riflemen could escape through overnight. By the next morning the survivors took up new defenses north and northeast of Târgu Frumos while the German forces built up positions to defend it. During the day on April 12 German infantry and assault guns cleared isolated parties from the 206th and 3rd Guards Airborne from a small pocket west of the town before further digging in. By the end of the day the three Soviet divisions held a line from the east bank of the Seret River near Pașcani east to the village of Munteni, 16 km northeast of Târgu Frumos.

The next day the Grenadier Regiment of Großdeutschland began probing the defenses of 35th Guards Corps. This produced a penetration in the sector of 3rd Guards Airborne which required the 93rd Guards to be brought back to the front line from second echelon. Further jockeying for position by both sides continued through the next ten days. Overnight on April 24/25 the 206th was relieved-in-place by the 36th Guards Rifle Division which almost immediately came under attack by Großdeutschland and Romanian 1st Guards Armored.

=== Second Battle of Târgu Frumos ===
The commander of 2nd Ukrainian Front, Marshal I. S. Konev, was still determined to take Iași and organized a new offensive to begin on May 1. As part of this 2nd Tank Army was to support 27th Army in recapturing Târgu Frumos by enveloping the town from the east and then exploiting towards Vaslui in the south or through Slobodzia to capture Iași. The 16th Tank Corps was to support and exploit the assault by the 206th and 3rd Guards Airborne Divisions. Großdeutschland continued to man defenses on a wide arc from northwest to northeast of the town, supported by 1st Guards Armored on its left and a regiment of the German 46th Infantry Division on its right. In the event Konev had to postpone the start of the offensive by 24 hours. On May 1 the shock groups of 27th Army attempted to carry out reconnaissances, but were met by German artillery fire and bombing attacks. In one of the latter Colonel Kolesnikov "perished" and Colonel Nosal, commander of 722nd Rifle Regiment, was wounded. By the next morning the division occupied positions south and southeast of Lake Hirbu.

The 27th Army's combat journal for May 2 describes the first day of the offensive:

The army commander decided to conduct the attack with three rifle divisions (the 3rd Guards Airborne, 93rd Guards Rifle, and 206th Rifle)[abreast from right to left] and retain one division (the 78th Rifle) in second echelon. The penetration of the defense was conducted along a 5.5-kilometre front in the sector from Cucuteni to... southwest of Lake Hirbu... in close cooperation with the 2nd Tank Army... The army's forces launched their attack at 0615 hours... after a 30-minute artillery preparation. Overcoming stubborn enemy resistance, the units of the 35th Guards Rifle Corps and 54th Fortified Region (on the army's right wing), in coordination with units of the 2nd Tank Army, wedged into the enemy's defenses and advanced four to six kilometres along the Târgu Frumos axis by 1100 hours... Enemy infantry and tanks (up to 70 tanks) counterattacked against the... attacking units at 1100 hours and pressed them back somewhat. Beginning at 1100 hours, groups of enemy aircraft repeatedly bombed the attacking units... The 35th Guards Rifle Corps lost 156 men killed and 275 wounded... during the day.

The 3rd Guards Airborne and 206th Divisions had shattered the defenses of the Fusilier Regiment of Großdeutschland from Hill 192 eastward to just west of the village of Polieni, captured the hilltop strongpoint, and driven the Fusiliers back towards Facuti. The supporting armor, including 16 IS-2 tanks of the 6th Guards Heavy Tank Regiment, reached the northern outskirts of that village and soon penetrated into it. This thrust was met by a battlegroup of 24th Panzer and the Panzer Regiment of Großdeutschland and stalled with losses to both sides.

Meanwhile the 206th, supported by the 164th Tank Brigade and 16th Motorized Rifle Brigade, was attacking the German strongpoint at Polieni, which was defended by one battalion of the 46th Infantry. During the afternoon the German armor renewed its attack at Facuti and in a matter of hours defeated and drove back the 3rd Guards Airborne and 16th Tank Corps. During the day 35th Guards Corps and 54th Fortified Region lost a total of 160 soldiers killed and 289 wounded. Overnight Marshal Konev refined his offensive plan, ordering his forces to concentrate on far narrower sectors than the day before. The 78th Rifle was to replace the 206th on the Polieni sector, after which it was to regroup to the west and take up assault positions due north of Hill 192. 16th Tank Corps was to regroup on a narrow 1.5 km sector between the village of Nikola and Hill 197. Altogether the 206th, 3rd Guards Airborne and 93rd Guards were concentrated, left to right, on a 6 km-wide front backed by about 70 armored vehicles and most of 27th Army's artillery, in order to penetrate the German defenses and support the commitment of 2nd Tank Army towards Târgu Frumos.

Overnight the German LVII Panzer Corps, which now included the 3rd SS Panzer Division Totenkopf, regrouped the bulk of its forces precisely opposite the sectors where Konev intended to deliver his main attack. The journal of 27th Army for May 3 states:

After methodically suppressing the enemy's firing points with artillery and mortar fire, at 0600 hours the army's forces attacked southward... [T]he formations on the right wing advanced forward a short distance. However, the forces in the center and on the left wing had no success, failed to advance, and were fighting along their previous lines at day's end... The 35th Guards Rifle Corps lost 156 killed and 275 wounded...

No further progress was made on May 4, at a cost to the Corps of 55 killed and 237 wounded. Konev now gave up all hopes of resuming his offensive.

==== Operation Katja ====
At 0550 hours on May 7 the LVII Panzer Corps began a counteroffensive against Konev's positions north and northeast of Târgu Frumos. After failing to halt the German attack the 206th began to withdraw toward Hill 192, which was lost to units of the 24th Panzer and 46th Infantry Divisions before an intervention by 16th Tank Corps stabilized the Soviet line. 35th Guards Corps lost another 86 killed and 291 wounded during the day and lost most of the gains made since May 2. The next day both sides went over to the defense. Later that month the division was transferred back to 33rd Rifle Corps. In the last days of May Großdeutschland and 24th Panzer were assembled near Tăutești for a spoiling attack designated Operation Katja. The 206th was just arriving in this area to form the second echelon of its Corps. The attack began on June 2 and quickly penetrated 33rd Corps' forward defenses. The 206th hastily manned defenses at and forward of Epureni before the 24th Panzer arrived late in the day as a few tanks of 11th Guards Tank Brigade arrived to reinforce.

At nightfall the Soviet armor, along with the remnants of the 206th and 202nd Divisions and the heavy weapons crews of 54th Fortified Region, were able to establish stable defenses just south of Movileni Station and the high ground to the west; more tanks from 16th Tank Corps arrived after dark. By now part of this sector of the Axis front had been turned over to the Romanian 18th Mountain Infantry Division. In the morning the Grenadier Regiment of Großdeutschland renewed the assault on Epureni and by evening had advanced to within 2 km of that village in the face of counterattacks by up to 20 tanks, including several IS-2s. The heavy fighting south of Epureni continued through June 4; at this point the German division had just four Tigers still serviceable. The next day the Romanian 18th Mountain took over the entire front facing Epureni as the panzers shifted to the east. On June 7 the 33rd Corps, now reinforced with the 93rd Guards and 409th Rifle Divisions, counterattacked toward Zahorna and took Hill 181 from the Romanian force. Großdeutschland was forced to intervene with what was left of its assault gun brigade. It was now clear that Katja could make no further progress and both sides went over to the defense the next day.

=== Second Jassy-Kishinev Offensive ===
On July 5 General Kalinin was hospitalized to convalesce from earlier wounds and was replaced in command the next day by Col. Aleksei Maksimovich Abramov. At about this time, as the division was rebuilding, it was noted as having about 80 percent of its personnel of Kazakh nationality, while most of the remainder were Russian. By the beginning of August it had returned to 35th Guards Corps, but before the start of the summer offensive it was again transferred, now to the 104th Rifle Corps. In the plan for the offensive the 27th and 52nd Armies were to provide the shock group for 2nd Ukrainian Front and the 104th and 35th Guards Corps were in 27th Army's first echelon. The 104th Corps deployed the 206th and 4th Guards Airborne Division in its first echelon on a 4 km-wide attack front, backed by the 11th Artillery Division, a heavy howitzer brigade, and 15 attached artillery brigades and regiments; in all the 206th would have 514 guns, mortars and rocket launchers firing in support. 27th Army was deployed along its previous lines, northeast of Târgu Frumos.

Overnight on August 17/18 the 202nd Division took over a wide sector of the front from the 206th, allowing the latter to concentrate for its attack. The offensive began on the morning of August 20 following a powerful artillery preparation which lasted an hour and 40 minutes. 27th Army broke through the Axis front northwest of Iași between Spinoasa and Zahorna along a 20 km-wide front and as early as 1100 hours had forced the Bahlui River. By 2000 hours the Army's forces had advanced 7–12 km. In the face of Axis counterattacks by the end of the day the 104th Corps was southeast of a line from Kosiceni to Păușești. The first echelon rifle divisions had successfully carried out their combat tasks for the day; among these was opening a breach to allow the 6th Tank Army to be committed and begin its exploitation role. Among the Axis forces facing 2nd Ukrainian Front four Romanian front-line divisions and the German 76th Infantry Division suffered heavy losses and 3,000 officers and men were taken prisoner.

The following day the offensive resumed at 0600 hours. Assisted by the 5th Guards Tank Corps the 104th Corps crushed the resistance of the Romanian 18th Mountain and 13th Infantry Divisions and the German 76th Infantry and 1st Panzer Divisions before fighting through heavy forest to overcome the Mare ridge. By the end of the day the 104th Corps reached a line east of Sinești to Schitu Stavnic. On August 22, while the Corps crossed the Bârlad River the 206th was pulled back into second echelon and concentrated in the Boresti area. The Front's goal for the next day was to help close the encirclement of the Axis Chișinău group of forces in conjunction with 3rd Ukrainian Front and by day's end 104th Corps had reached a line from Ivănești to Corodesti. On August 24 the 27th Army advanced as much as 30 km as the remnants of the Romanian units it faced ceased offering resistance. By the end of the day the Corps was operating on a line from Oprișești to Fatacuni. On September 15 the 748th Rifle Regiment would be decorated for its role in the capture of the cities of Roman and Bârlad with the Order of Kutuzov, 3rd Degree.

== Into the Balkans ==
In the following days the 206th was attached to the 6th Tank Army as it exploited towards Romania and on August 27 the 737th Rifle Regiment was awarded an honorific:

FOCSANI... 737th Rifle Regiment (Lieutenant Colonel Belyaev, Aleksandr Semenovich)... The troops who participated in the capture of Focsani and Râmnicu Sărat, by the order of the Supreme High Command of 27 August 1944, and a commendation in Moscow, are given a salute of 20 artillery salvoes from 224 guns.

During the next three days the division returned to 27th Army, back in 35th Guards Corps, and two more of its regiments were similarly honored:

PLOESTI... 722nd Rifle Regiment (Major Kosmin, Anisii Vasilevich)... 661st Artillery Regiment (Lieutenant Colonel Pushevskii, Mikhail Ivanovich)... The troops who participated in the capture of Ploesti, by the order of the Supreme High Command of 30 August 1944, and a commendation in Moscow, are given a salute of 20 artillery salvoes from 224 guns.

A day or two later the division was reassigned again, back to the 104th Corps. On September 29, as the offensive into Romania continued, Colonel Abramov handed his command to Col. Fyodor Ivanovich Dremenkov; this officer would remain in command for the duration. During October the right-wing armies of the Front, including the 27th, cleared the region of Transylvania of Axis forces. On October 11 the 748th Rifle Regiment (Lieutenant Colonel Podukh, Aleksandr Potapovich) was awarded an honorific for its part in the capture of Cluj-Napoca and on November 14 the same Regiment was awarded the Order of Bogdan Khmelnitsky, 2nd Degree, while the 661st Artillery Regiment received the Order of Aleksandr Nevsky for their roles in the Transylvanian campaign.

=== Budapest Offensive ===
During early November the right flank armies of the Front (40th, 27th, 53rd and Cavalry-Mechanized Group Pliev) continued their previous advance into southeastern Hungary while the left flank armies marched on Budapest. The 27th and 53rd Armies were facing units of German 6th Army, which included the III Panzer Corps, Hungarian 2nd Armored Division and five Hungarian infantry divisions, but the Panzer Corps was soon moved westward to deal with the thrust on the Hungarian capital. On the morning of November 4 the 27th Army was to relieve units of 53rd Army along a sector from Polgár to Tiszafüred but this was complicated by ongoing fighting for the former town. A renewed offensive began on November 7 and the right flank continued a slow advance until the 25th. During this period the 206th was moved again, now back to the 35th Guards Corps. At this point the 27th and 40th Armies were directed to regroup with the objective of capturing the Miskolc area. This important industrial and communications center was taken jointly by the two Armies on December 3. By the end of the day on December 19 the 27th Army was fighting along a front from 32–55 km northeast of Gyöngyös.

=== Into Slovakia and Austria ===
During January 1945, the 206th was detached from corps commands to serve as a separate division within 27th Army. On January 23 it assisted units of the 4th Romanian Army (now fighting on the Allied side) in the liberation of the Slovak town of Rožňava; for its role in this on February 19 the 737th Regiment would be awarded the Order of Suvorov, 3rd Degree. During February the Army came under command of 3rd Ukrainian Front and the division was again returned to 33rd Rifle Corps, where it would remain for the duration.

With the end of the siege of Budapest and the German Operation Spring Awakening the Front was free to begin its final campaign into Austria. Székesfehérvár was captured for the second time on March 22 and for its part in this the 206th was awarded its final decoration, the Order of Bogdan Khmelnitsky, 2nd Degree, on April 26. On the same date the 748th Regiment was given the Order of the Red Banner and the 722nd Regiment received the Order of Kutuzov, 3rd Degree, both for assisting in the capture of the towns of Körmend and Vasvár.

== Postwar ==
The division ended the war in western Austria. Its men and women shared the full title of 206th Rifle Korsun, Order of the Red Banner, Order of Suvorov and Kutuzov, Order of Bogdan Khmelnitsky Division. [Russian: 206-я стрелковая Корсунских, Краснознамённая, орденов Суворова и Кутузова, орденом Богдана Хмельницкого дивизия.] In accordance with STAVKA Order No. 00117 May 10, 1946 the 206th was officially disbanded on June 20.

== Legacy ==
A color guard escorting the combat flag of the 748th Infantry Regiment during the 2020 Moscow Victory Day Parade.

- A memorial sign installed 400 meters from the Kiev-Volynsky railway near the railway, which is part of the area that the soldiers of the 1st Formation of the 206th Rifle Division defended from August to September 1941.
- A memorial to the soldiers of the 206th Rifle Division in the Metallurgical Park in the city Nikopol where part of the 1st Formation was formed.
- In 2020, the 75th anniversary of the victory in the war was celebrated with a military parade and festive celebrations in the city of Ashgabat (the capital of Turkmenistan). The ceremony, which was held at a square in front of the Halk Hakydasy Memorial Complex, saw the banner of the 748th Rifle Regiment of the 206th Rifle Division being transferred from a Russian soldier to the hands of an officer in the Turkmen National Army. The banner's symbolism lies in the fact that Berdimuhamed Annayev, who is the grandfather of Turkmen President Gurbanguly Berdimuhamedow, served in the regiment. The change over ceremony was overseen by President Berdimuhamedow and Russian Deputy Minister of Defence Alexander Fomin.
- During the 2020 Moscow Victory Day Parade, Turkmen contingent sent to the ceremony consisted of two color guards (one of which carried the combat flag of the 748th Infantry Regiment while riding in two GAZ-M20 Pobeda cars brought in from the Turkmen capital.
