= 237th Rifle Division =

237th Rifle Division (March 14, 1941 - September 17, 1941) 237th Rifle Division (December 3, 1941 - July 1945)
- Active: 1941–1945
- Country: Soviet Union
- Branch: Red Army
- Type: Infantry
- Size: Division
- Engagements: Operation Barbarossa; Leningrad strategic defensive Soltsy-Dno Offensive; Case Blue; Voronezh–Kastornoye offensive Third Battle of Kharkov; Battle of Kursk; Belgorod–Kharkov offensive operation Battle of the Dniepr; Battle of Kiev (1943); Kiev Strategic Defensive Operation; Proskurov-Chernivtsi offensive Lvov–Sandomierz offensive Battle of the Dukla Pass; Western Carpathian offensive Moravia–Ostrava offensive
- Decorations: Order of the Red Banner (2nd formation); Order of Suvorov (2nd formation); Order of Bogdan Khmelnitsky (2nd formation)
- Battle honours: Pyriatyn (2nd formation)

Commanders
- Notable commanders: Maj. Gen. Dmitrii Fyodorovich Popov; Col. Vasilii Viktorovich Noskov; Col. Pyotr Vakulovich Tertyshnyi; Col. Vitalii Ivanovich Novozhilov; Maj. Gen. Pyotr Aleksandrovich Dyakonov; Maj. Gen. Fyodor Nazarovich Parkhomenko; Maj. Gen. Dmitrii Feoktisovich Dryomin; Col. Mikhail Grigorovich Tetenko

The 237th Rifle Division was an infantry division of the Red Army, originally formed in the months just before the start of the German invasion, based on the shtat (table of organization and equipment) of September 13, 1939. At the opening of Operation Barbarossa it was in the Leningrad Military District where it had formed near the Finnish border but was soon moved south to defend against German Army Group North. As part of 16th Rifle Corps in 11th Army it took part in the battle of Soltsy, which imposed a significant delay on the German advance toward Leningrad. In August it was encircled while serving with 48th Army and suffered such heavy losses that it was disbanded on September 17.

A new division, originally numbered as the 455th, began forming in the Siberian Military District in early December and was soon redesignated as the 2nd formation of the 237th. After training and equipping it entered the fighting front northwest of Voronezh in late July as part of a counteroffensive by Bryansk Front against the advancing German Army Group B but suffered heavy losses in just two days of combat and was rendered ineffective. After rebuilding during the autumn the 237th took part in the Voronezh–Kastornoye Offensive in January-February 1943, during which it took part in the destruction of one column of Axis troops attempting to escape the encirclement. It played a minor role in the battle of Kursk, after which it went over to the summer offensive into eastern Ukraine as part of 40th Army, winning a battle honor on its way to the Dniepr River. In this Army, as part of 1st Ukrainian Front, it was involved in the ultimately futile battles for the Bukryn bridgehead. Following the liberation of Kyiv it took part in the defense against the following German counteroffensive and then went over to the offensive itself, winning the Order of the Red Banner for the liberation of Zhmerynka while serving in 38th Army. The division was soon shifted to the 1st Guards Army and played a secondary role in the Lvov–Sandomierz operation, during which its artillery regiment earned a battle honor. With its Army it was reassigned to the 4th Ukrainian Front in August and it would remain in the Front for the duration of the war, serving under a variety of corps and army commands, and winning further distinctions as it fought through the Carpathian Mountains into Czechoslovakia. Despite a solid record as a combat unit the 237th was disbanded within months of the German surrender.

== 1st Formation ==
The division began forming on March 14, 1941, at Petrozavodsk in the Leningrad Military District. When the German invasion began it was still there and it had the following order of battle:

- 835th Rifle Regiment
- 838th Rifle Regiment
- 841st Rifle Regiment
- 691st Artillery Regiment
- 715th Howitzer Artillery Regiment
- 5th Antitank Battalion
- 298th Antiaircraft Battalion
- 270th Reconnaissance Battalion
- 367th Sapper Battalion
- 574th Signal Battalion
- 395th Medical/Sanitation Battalion
- 237th Chemical Defense (Anti-gas) Company
- 705th Motor Transport Battalion
- 490th Field Bakery
- 492nd Divisional Veterinary Hospital
- 682nd Field Postal Station
- 555th Field Office of the State Bank

Maj. Gen. Dmitrii Fyodorovich Popov had been appointed to command on the day the division began forming. This officer had been serving as a senior instructor at the Frunze Military Academy since 1935. As of June 22 it was assigned to 7th Army in Northern Front. In planning less than a month before the invasion 7th Army constituted Covering Region No. 2 of the Leningrad District, responsible for the sector along the Finnish border from Lake Onega to Lake Ladoga with four rifle divisions and one fortified region. By July 10 the 237th had been reassigned, joining the 70th Rifle Division in the 16th Rifle Corps of 11th Army in Northwestern Front.

=== Counterstroke at Soltsy ===
At this time the LVI Motorized Corps of 4th Panzer Group, supported by infantry of the I Army Corps, was advancing along the Luga axis through Soltsy toward Novgorod. The 8th Panzer Division, in the vanguard, penetrated 30-40km along the Shimsk road and reached the town of Soltsy late on July 13. Here it was halted by spirited resistance from the 177th Rifle Division and the 10th Mechanized Corps, skillfully exploiting the difficult terrain. By nightfall the panzers found themselves isolated from the 3rd Motorized Division to its left and the 3rd SS Totenkopf Division lagging in the rear.

Alert for opportunities to strike back, the STAVKA ordered a counterstroke against the overexposed German force. This was communicated to Marshal K. Ye. Voroshilov, who in turn directed 11th Army to attack along the Soltsy-Dno axis with two shock groups. The northern group consisted of the 10th Mechanized's 21st Tank Division and the two divisions of 16th Rifle Corps, with reinforcements from the 1st People's Militia (DNO) Division and 1st Mountain Rifle Brigade. The southern group consisted of the 22nd Rifle Corps and was to attack 8th Panzer from the east. The assault, launched in oppressive 32 degree C summer heat and massive clouds of dust, caught 8th Panzer and 3rd Motorized totally by surprise. The two divisions were soon isolated from one another and 8th Panzer was forced to fight a costly battle in encirclement for four days. It also disrupted the German offensive plans by forcing 4th Panzer Group to divert 3rd SS from the Kingisepp and Luga axes to rescue the beleaguered panzer division. In his memoirs the commander of LVI Corps, Gen. E. von Manstein, wrote:

Our corps' position at that moment was hardly an enviable one, and we could not help wondering whether we had taken rather too great a risk this time... As matters stood, the only course open to us was to pull 8 Panzer Division back through [S]oltsy to escape the encirclement that now threatened... The next days proved critical, with the enemy straining every nerve to keep up his encirclement and throwing in, besides his rifle divisions, two armoured divisions enjoying strong artillery and air support. 8 Panzer Division nevertheless managed to break through [S]oltsy to the west and re-group, despite having to be temporarily supplied from the air.

The Soltsy counterstroke cost 8th Panzer 70 of its 150 tanks destroyed or damaged and represented the first, albeit temporary, success achieved by Soviet forces on the path to Leningrad. It also cost the German command a precious week to regroup and resume the advance. However, the cost to the Soviet forces was high. For his perceived failures, General Popov was relieved of his command on July 19 and arrested. He was soon sentenced to two years imprisonment but was later released to serve in rear area administration and in the training establishment. He would be rearrested in July 1943 and would remain in prison for the next ten years before being released and rehabilitated in the wake of Stalin's death. He was replaced in command of the 237th by Col. Vasilii Viktorovich Noskov.

=== Defense of Leningrad ===
On July 17 the division had come under command of 27th Army, but by the beginning of August it and the rest of 16th Corps had been assigned to the Novgorod Army Operational Group. On August 7 the 48th Army was formed in Northwestern Front, which consisted of the 1st DNO Division, the 70th, 128th and 237th Divisions (16th Corps was disbanded at around this time), 1st Mountain Rifle Brigade and 21st Tank Division. The Army was responsible for defending the Front's left flank north of Lake Ilmen. The German I and XXVIII Army Corps resumed the advance on August 10 along the Novgorod axis. The two Corps tore through the partially prepared defenses of 48th Army along the Mshaga River and captured Shimsk late on August 12. The next day the 237th was surrounded and forced to break out with serious losses. By August 20 the Army was a wreck, with only 6,235 personnel, 5,043 rifles and 31 artillery pieces remaining. On August 31 the remnants of the division were assigned to the 55th Army, which was defending the Slutsk–Kolpinskii area of Leningrad Front. On September 9 Colonel Noskov left the division and was replaced the next day by Col. Aleksandr Ignatevich Korolev, who had previously served as chief of staff of 168th Rifle Division. It proved to be a short-lived assignment as the 237th was disbanded on September 17 to provide replacements for other units in 55th Army, particularly the 70th Division. Korolev was immediately given command of the 90th Rifle Division and led it until November 1942 when he was detached to further his education. He returned to the front in May 1943 to take command of the 23rd Rifle Division; he would be raised to the rank of major general on September 1. On September 29 he was killed in action while leading the defense of a bridgehead during the battles for the Dniepr River. On October 25 he was posthumously made a Hero of the Soviet Union.

== 2nd Formation ==
A new division, originally numbered as the 455th, began forming at Stalinsk in the Siberian Military District on December 3, 1941, based on the shtat of July 29, but on January 13, 1942 it was redesignated as the 2nd formation of the 237th. Once formed its order of battle was very similar to that of the 1st formation:

- 835th Rifle Regiment
- 838th Rifle Regiment
- 841st Rifle Regiment
- 691st Artillery Regiment
- 5th Antitank Battalion
- 124th Mortar Battalion (until October 10, 1942)
- 501st Reconnaissance Company
- 367th Sapper Battalion
- 574th Signal Battalion (later 696th Signal Company)
- 395th Medical/Sanitation Battalion
- 231st Chemical Defense (Anti-gas) Company
- 589th Motor Transport Company
- 442nd Field Bakery
- 907th Divisional Veterinary Hospital
- 1402nd Field Postal Station
- 1072nd Field Office of the State Bank

Col. Pyotr Vakulovich Tertyshnyi was appointed to command on the day the division began forming. This officer had previously led the 1004th Rifle Regiment of 305th Rifle Division before becoming deputy commander of 3rd Tank Division. Being formed in the Kuzbas the new division contained a large number of coal miners. It spent the first three months of 1942 in Siberia, training and equipping, and in April it was moved to Vologda to finish forming. At the beginning of May the 237th was assigned to the 2nd Reserve Army and was still under that command at the beginning of July, after Case Blue, the German summer offensive, had begun. It was soon transferred to 3rd Reserve Army and was under that command on July 10 when it was redesignated as 60th Army. A week later the division entered the active army when 60th Army was assigned to Voronezh Front.

=== With Operational Group Chibisov ===
As the 237th approached the front the Front began a counteroffensive operation west of the Don River on July 21 with a large portion of its forces under command of Maj. Gen. N. E. Chibisov, who was the Front's deputy commander-in-chief. Group Chibisov initially consisted of the 340th, 284th and 193rd Rifle Divisions, plus the 104th Rifle Brigade and 1st Tank Corps, but would later be reinforced with the 237th and 167th Rifle Divisions and 2nd Tank Corps. The intention was to strike the left flank of the advancing Army Group B and get into the rear of the German forces that had recently captured Voronezh.

The defending German 387th and 340th Infantry Divisions were well dug in along a line they had won nearly two weeks earlier. On the first day of the counteroffensive these defenses were breached roughly on the boundary between the two divisions, but not sufficiently to permit the commitment of 2nd Tanks. After an overnight raid into the German rear by the 148th Tank Brigade, the 193rd and 167th Divisions were able to make more substantial gains on July 22. Under these circumstances General Chibisov believed the time had come to commit his reserves, namely the 237th plus the attached 201st Tank Brigade. After detraining at Lipetsk station on July 13 the division had begun marching to the southwest. Due to a lack of horse and motor transport the riflemen were forced to carry heavy machine guns, mortars, antitank rifles. and the ammunition for them. By dawn on July 15 they had covered nearly 50km before halting to establish a defensive line. (Local residents recalled that "the soldiers were so exhausted that they were collapsing and falling asleep in the dust on the roadside.") The next day Colonel Tertyshnyi received orders to move again, now to the village of Glushitsy on the Voronezh River, which entailed another march of up to 25km. Before the regiments could assemble there another order arrived to pivot the division to the northwest and cross the Don as the division was reassigned to Bryansk Front.

When Tertyshnyi's soldiers arrived at the crossing points at Dmitriashevka and Kon-Kolodez there was no bridge and only a low-capacity ferry at the former place. The artillery, motor vehicles and wagons had to wait their turn to use the ferry while the vast majority of the soldiers had only one way to cross: by swimming. A nurse of the division, E. I. Platonova, wrote after the war:

When they told us that a big river was in front of us, which we would have to cross by swimming, many soldiers lost heart. After all, not all of them knew how to swim, and those who could swim had doubts. No one had ever tried to swim while carrying a load, and here you had all a soldier's property: a backpack holding a greatcoat, boots, grenades and bullets. All this would immediately sink a soldier to the bottom of the river as soon as he entered the water. The command was in a hurry, there was no time to wait. So they crossed; some on rafts, some in boats, some clinging to logs, others to wood doors...
Fountains of water were rising here and there in the river from exploding shells. Some shells struck a target, smashing the raft or boat and killing or wounding the soldiers... So many bodies were floating in the river, who was counting them? Or else you'd see a cluster of drowned men floating along the river, and your entire body gets stiff in paroxysms of fear...
In our sector, where our battalion crossed, thick ropes had been stretched across the river in several places. The river's current was swift, and if you became separated from the rope, to which you were clinging with one hand, then you had to look to where the current was taking you and grab on to another rope... Many went missing during the soldiers' crossing of the Don River, but who is guilty in this? The war.

After completing the crossing and burying the dead that could be recovered the division assembled in the Dmitriashevka area. Following this it moved out to the west to prepare a line of defense on the east bank of Nega Creek. The division's main forces continued this during July 21 and 22, apart from the 691st Artillery Regiment, which had been attached to the 167th Division. It was here that Tertyshnyi received orders from Chibisov at 1430 hours on July 22 to join the counteroffensive; in fact, the orders were some 5-6 hours late in arriving as they directed the division to begin moving at 1130.

The 237th began moving west again in the late afternoon toward Lomovo, again without adequate transport and under occasional air attack, both of which slowed the march to roughly 5-6km per hour. It was only well after dark that the main forces arrived in their jumping-off area and the artillery regiment was unable to reach its new firing positions until some time later. Orders from Chibisov's headquarters setting an H-hour of 0700 hours on July 23 were also late arriving, at 0340. Contact had not yet been made with the 201st Tanks and there was no opportunity to reconnoitre the attack front. Under the circumstances Tertyshnyi requested a postponement until 1500 hours, which was granted.

==== Attack on July 23 ====
The 691st Artillery began a 30-minute preparation at 1430 hours, but was hampered due to having only 0.75 of a standard combat load of ammunition available. The 835th Rifle Regiment was on the division's right, supported by two battalions of the 691st (although one was not yet in position) plus 10 Matilda II tanks and 10 T-60s. Its immediate objective was Hill 212.9 and the village of Chibisovka. The 838th Regiment was on the left, backed by the remaining battalion of the 691st, and was to take the southern slopes of Hill 213.8, something that the right flank regiment of the 340th Division had failed to do in the first two days of the counteroffensive. The 841st Regiment was in second echelon, although its 3rd Battalion was lagging behind. Overall the attack frontage was roughly 4km wide and the two full-strength rifle regiments were forced into dense combat formations. German defensive artillery and mortar fire soon began to cause casualties but the riflemen pushed on, reaching each of the hills where they encountered increasing machine gun and rifle fire. A gap appeared at the boundary of the two leading regiments due to a resistance nest in the woods north of Vysochkino which had stymied the 284th and 340th Divisions in the previous days. The 835th Regiment became pinned down by crossfire along the road to Chibisovka. The 838th Regiment reached the slopes of Hill 213.8 but came under fire of their own inexperienced artillery and mortar men. Once the two regiments ultimately overcame several kilometres of German advanced positions they became tied up in fighting in the main defensive belt. Now that this position had been revealed the guns and mortars had nearly run out of ammunition, so there was nothing available to suppress or knock out the firing positions. Following the fighting the division's political officers also reported several shortcomings of the divisional and regimental leadership.

By the evening the 237th's attack everywhere had sputtered out under intense German fire. The last effort was made on the left flank of the 835th Regiment when its 1st Battalion attempted to overcome the position north of Vysochkino, attacking the western fringe of the woods:

The commander... [Sen. Lt. Yushchenkov] and his headquarters particularly stood out in the fighting. Having broken through to the western fringe of the woods, the group encountered enemy fire coming from out of the woods, where a group of German officers was ensconced. The combat started with grenades and ended in hand-to-hand fighting, as a result of which the enemy group was partially destroyed, while the survivors fled in panic, abandoning weapons and documents.

However, the resistance nest itself was not destroyed and the 1st Battalion, ending up in semi-encirclement, was compelled to retreat. As darkness descended the 835th had penetrated as much as 1,500m into the main defense line, but the exhausted troops were soon forced back in places by counterattacks. Overnight, Tertyshnyi's headquarters made plans to resume the attack in the morning. The 841st Regiment reported losses of 26 killed, 60 wounded and 23 missing for the day, but the condition of the two leading regiments was only partly known; the commander of the 838th had submitted only one short report during the day. By contrast the commander of the 835th submitted a pessimistic and alarming report at day's end:

... the 1st and 3rd Battalions ran into a fortified area, suffered enormous losses, and the neighbor on the right retreated. My elements are holding out in small groups. Cartridges and shells have been exhausted... I am taking measures to save the remnants of personnel and equipment.

It was later established that the soldiers of the 835th had received only 100g of bread each during July 23. The division received no news about resupply of food and ammunition, and the lack of transport meant most of the many wounded were stranded at the aid stations. Overnight a directive arrived from Chibisov's headquarters informing Tertyshnyi that his 841st Regiment was being withdrawn to the operational group reserve, while the division's objectives remained unchanged.

==== Fighting on July 24 ====
Just as dawn was breaking the next day the poorly-prepared positions of the 237th came under repeated air attacks from 9-12 Luftwaffe bombers each, soon accompanied by German artillery and mortar fire. Observers soon saw silhouettes of tanks moving forward from the south, which were the leading elements of the 9th Panzer Division. The forward elements of 835th Regiment counted up to 40 to begin with, followed by a second group that drove the total to nearly 100. Due to the lack of ammunition there was little the division could do to respond, and no Soviet aircraft appeared. Soon supporting infantry was seen as well. The experienced commander of the 284th Division, Col. N. F. Batyuk, saw this buildup as well and noted its openly intimidating nature, observing, "All the enemy's actions were designed to affect morale." The armor eventually began to roll toward the 835th Regiment from the west out of the area of Hill 214.6 and from the south out of Novopavlovka.

According to the division's war diary the fighting developed as follows:

Unable to withstand the blow of the enemy's attacking units, the forward units of the 835th Rifle Regiment began to retreat into the depth of their combat formations without orders. Up to five battalions of [German] infantry, escorted by up to 100 tanks, began to exert pressure on the 835th Rifle Regiment, and the regiment began to retreat, at first covering it with fire, before going into disorderly retreat.
Thanks to a coincidental convergence of events, a staff officer of the division's operations department had been sent to the village of Kamenka... he spotted the regiment's disorganized flight, shot several of the fleeing men, made a quick situational decision and took up an area of defense on Hill 207.2 and Hill 217.8 where the regiment's retreating elements began to rally.
After the 835th Rifle Regiment fell back, passing with its left flank through the right flank of the 841st Rifle Regiment, the entire mass of enemy tank and infantry fell upon two battalions of the [latter] regiment. The first frontal attack was repulsed and the enemy, suffering losses, began to envelop the battalions from the flanks, having left behind a small screening force in front. Up to 60 tanks were hurled against the 841st Rifle Regiment by the enemy. The enemy's second attack was driven back, just like the first attack. After regrouping, the enemy went on the attack for the third time. The battalions became fully encircled on Hill 212.9; the regiment's headquarters was located in some woods lying 2 kilometres to the northeast of Hill 212.9.

As the battle developed the fighting became close combat. At one point the 66th Guards Mortar Regiment, mistaken believing the German forces had taken the hill, dropped 276 rockets on both sides. While the two battalions managed to hold their positions it was at considerable cost; in the end only 200 men came out of the fighting unwounded and the commanders and commissars of both perished. The regimental commander, Major Dudkin, could do little to help because his 3rd Battalion was still in the rear near Kreshchenka. He ordered his regimental specialist units to withdraw but these were spotted and came under air attack; the retreat became a rout with some fleeing all the way back to the Don. After the counterattack began the commander of the 201st Tank Brigade, without orders, withdrew his 23 operational tanks beyond Muravevka and Kamenka, leaving the 237th in the lurch. Under the circumstances Chibisov was forced to relocate his 2nd Tank Corps to fill the gap caused by the 237th being largely overrun. The 838th was still making slow progress toward its objectives until 9th Panzer switched its attention from the 835th during the afternoon. The 838th was also unable to withstand the pressure and began to retreat to Lomovo and even further north. While two battalions withdrew under cover of a ravine the third battalion was spotted by German aircraft and came under a combined air, armor and infantry attack which led to a rout. During the day the regiment fell back up to 22km from its morning positions. The firing positions of the 691st Artillery also came under attack from tanks and aircraft which destroyed the 1st Battery plus a large number of horses. The retreat of the division inevitably uncovered the flanks of the neighboring 284th and 340th Divisions and Colonel Batyuk later wrote:

At 0800 the 237th Rifle Division, without offering any resistance, was fleeing in the direction of Kamenka, completely exposing the left flank and rear of the 284th Rifle Division, and made no attempts to regain its lines or to render fire support.

A similar report was made by the headquarters of the 340th, including an account from late in the day that nearly 4,000 soldiers of the 237th had been detained by the 340th's blocking detachments.

==== The Continuing Operation ====
Despite the disaster that had engulfed the division Chibisov expected it to be rallied, reorganized and returned to action the next day, and therefore included it in his plans for July 25. At 0100 hours Tertyshnyi received orders stating: "By dawn take up a line along Hill 212.9, Hill 217.8 and the woods south of there, and at 0500 on 25 July go on the attack with the 2nd Tank Corps; having taken Vysochkino, regain the previous position." However, the dawn caught his division scattered all over the map, from Kamenka and Ozerki in the west to Khlevnoe and Kon Kolodez in the east, already on the left bank of the Don. The majority of its units were located in the vicinity of Muravevka, Lukino, Dolgoe, and Verkhnaia and Nizhnaia Kolybelka. The 841st's chief of staff returned to the regiment but the commander and commissar were still missing; the latter showed up around noon but Major Dudkin did not appear until two days later, having fled across the Don. Tertyshnyi decided at dawn to take up a defense on Hills 217.8 and 208.8, which, since these were both in German hands, shows he did not have a full appreciation of the situation. In contrast the divisional diary reported:

In the course of the night, wagons and remnants of the battalions of the 838th and 841st Rifle Regiments that had come out of the battle, as well as the intact 3rd Battalion of the 841st Rifle Regiment, were accumulating in Muravevka. In addition, several tank brigades were located there - the congestion of men and machines was extraordinary.

Into this chaos a group of German bombers raided the village at 0500 and although casualties were light the panic was described as "appalling". This bombing completed the demoralization of the 237th, leaving it no longer combat-capable. The 835th was still on starvation rations and its regimental gun battery had only 36 shells available.

On July 26 the elements of the division that had been reorganized were occupying a defense on a line from Kamenka to Hill 217.8 to Hill 208.8. 9th Panzer was expected to continue advancing north but instead struck southeast against 1st Tank Corps and the 167th Division in an effort to link up with the 387th Infantry Division. Overnight on July 28/29 the 7th Tank Corps, supported by elements of the 284th and 237th Divisions, launched a raid against the 385th Infantry Division which drove the German line back toward Vysochkino, but by now the operation was effectively finished. The commander of the 7th Tanks noted that the morale of the 237th was still very shaky: "Given the slightest attack by enemy aircraft, they ran away in panic, as happened on 29.7.42 when they fled from Hill 199.8 to Kamenka... I've already reported to you in code about the commander of the 237th Rifle Division Colonel Tertyshnyi's failure twice to carry out a combat order from the headquarters of the 7th Tank Corps." In fact, both headquarters traded accusations non-cooperation and slacking.

The losses suffered by the 237th in its first combat operation were disquieting:

The losses in the division's units as a result of the fighting from 23 to 30.7.42 reached enormous dimensions; the personnel of the division became equal to the following - instead of 1,136 men in the command staff, there are 780; instead of 2,752 men of the junior command staff, there are 1,684 left; instead of 8,990 rank and file - 5,770. Instead of 2,113 horses, there are 1,382 horses...

There were also significant losses in arms and equipment. Tertyshnyi wrote to General Chibisov on the same date requesting that he not be given any offensive combat tasks over the following 2-3 days. Chibisov in turn wrote to the Front headquarters recommending that Major Dudkin of the 841st Regiment be turned over to a military tribunal for having abandoned his post. Not coincidentally with the defeat of Chibisov's operation, on July 28 Stalin issued Order No. 227, generally known as "Not a Step Back!" On August 4 Tertyshnyi was reassigned to command of the 161st Rifle Division; he would be promoted to the rank of major general in January 1943 and would be made a Hero of the Soviet Union during the Dniepr River battles. He ended the war in command of 15th Rifle Corps and was promoted to lieutenant general soon afterward. He was replaced in command of the 237th by Col. Vitalii Ivanovich Novozhilov. When Operational Group Chibisov was disbanded during August the division came under command of 38th Army, still in Bryansk Front.

== Voronezh–Kastornoye Offensive ==
The division remained in the same area, rebuilding, under these same commands until September when 38th Army was transferred to Voronezh Front. It remained under these commands into 1943. On January 1 Colonel Novozhilov left the 237th and was replaced by Col. Pyotr Aleksandrovich Dyakonov, who had previously served as chief-of-staff of the 340th Division. At the start of the Ostrogozhsk–Rossosh Offensive on January 13 the Army had the 237th, 167th, and 240th Rifle Divisions, 248th Rifle Brigade, and 7th Destroyer (Antitank) Brigade under command, and was led by General Chibisov. During that offensive the 38th was assigned a defensive role, holding along a 55km-wide sector from Kozinka to Olkhovatka. By January 19 the main forces of Hungarian 2nd and Italian 8th Armies had been encircled and over the following days were largely destroyed, creating conditions for a further offensive against the German 2nd Army and the rump of the Hungarian 2nd.

When the operation began on January 24 Chibisov had formed a shock group with his 167th and 240th Divisions, the 7th Destroyer Brigade, plus a tank brigade and two tank battalions. The 237th and the 248th Brigade were to continue an active defense along the remaining 46km front. By now the Army had the 206th Rifle Division (minus a regiment) as a reserve. Its main forces would advance toward Nizhnyaya Veduga with one division on Kastornoye. Once the encirclement was made the secondary attacks by 38th and 60th Armies would split up and eliminate the isolated forces.

When the offensive began the command of Army Group B correctly determined its intention and possibilities. Believing that the encirclement of its 2nd Army would only be a matter of several days, orders were given to the VII Army Corps to withdraw from Voronezh and across the Don. Reconnaissance by 60th Army discovered this movement and it began to pursue. By dawn on January 25 the city had been completely cleared. 38th Army's offensive began on January 25, moved up a day due to the German retreat from Voronezh. The attack did not begin until 1630 hours following a 30-minute artillery preparation on a 14km sector from Kozinka to Ozerki. It was renewed on the morning of January 26 with another artillery preparation and by the end of the day the shock group had penetrated the Axis defense to a depth of up to 8km. The 237th and the 248th Brigade, while continuing to defend their line, received instructions from Chibisov to be ready to go over to the offensive in the direction of Zemlyansk and Perlevka.

As the Axis withdrawal accelerated the 38th Army went over to the attack along its entire front on January 27. Col. Gen. F. I. Golikov, commander of Voronezh Front, ordered a change to the operational plan, sending the shock group plus the 180th Tanks in the direction of Kastornoye. This led to an advance of 15km during the day's fighting, with the 237th capturing Fedorovka, Chibisovskaya and Gremyachee and continuing to attack toward Vereika. The next day the tank brigade reached Kastornoye in conjunction with mobile forces of the 13th and 40th Armies, followed by rifle units of the 13th Army and the shock group of the 38th, leading to a stubborn fight for the town into the morning of January 29; meanwhile the division, along with the 248th Brigade, took Zemlyansk and Perlevka. As a result of these advances the main escape routes of the Axis Voronezh-Kastornoye group of forces had been cut.

=== Battle for the Pocket ===
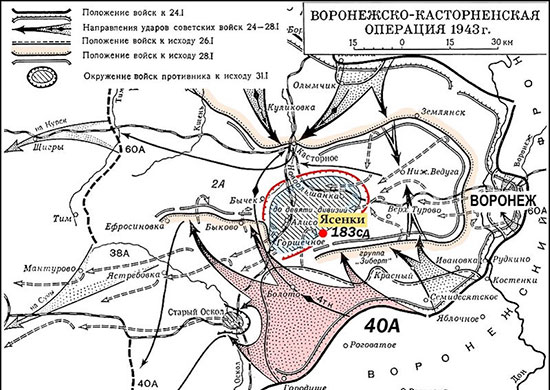
Voronezh–Kastornoye Offensive

A total of eight German and two Hungarian divisions were now encircled. 38th and 40th Armies were assigned the task of clearing the pocket while the remaining Armies continued advancing westward. The clearing operation was expected to take two or three days after which the two Armies would redeploy to lines for a subsequent offensive toward Oboyan and Kharkiv. On January 29 the 237th routed the Axis garrison of Staraya Veduga, occupied it, and developed its success toward Orekhovo. At the same time it was fighting against Axis rearguards which were covering the retreat in the direction of Gorshechnoe. By the end of January 30 the division had occupied Redkodube and Petrovka and had begun fighting for Nizhnedevitsk Station. The next day elements of the division captured Shirokii and Vasilevka en route to Gorshechnoe.

On February 1 General Chibisov was ordered to occupy the town of Tim with the 240th and 167th Divisions and to launch an attack with the 237th and 180th Tanks from the Shirokii–Vasilevka area in order to assist the 40th Army in destroying the Axis grouping south of Kastornoe. In the event these two formations were unable to overcome resistance in Alisovo during the day. Moreover, there remained an Axis group of 30,000-35,000 men east of Gorshechnoe still attempting to break out of the encirclement and the 237th, along with four other rifle divisions and one brigade, were tied down in fighting with it. A breakout effort to the west and southwest, organized in three columns, began overnight on February 1/2. The next day the 237th and the 206th Divisions were working together to counter the Axis moves to the west. By the end of February 4 the northern (Siebert) column was desperately seeking to break through in the direction of Bogatyrevo but was blocked by the 206th. The rearguards of the central (Bruchmann) column were being engaged in the Gorshechnoe area by the 237th and one regiment of the 25th Guards Rifle Division. The 237th was expected to be relieved overnight on February 4/5 along the line of Timofeevka–eastern outskirts of Gorshechnoe by units of the 129th Rifle Brigade, and was then to concentrate in Verkhnie Apochki.

On the morning of February 5 the main forces of the Siebert column pushed aside elements of the 206th and had begun moving on Verkhnie Apochki but was halted by one rifle regiment of the 237th; attempts to bypass this village were beaten off by the 253rd Rifle Brigade and fighting went on through the night. Late that evening the task of defeating the encircled forces had finally been entrusted to 38th Army alone. The 237th was ordered to prevent the Axis forces from retreating along the road through Yefrosinovka and Repevka to Tim, while stubbornly holding the line Verkhnie Apochki–Sennoe. Operations through February 6-7 took place in blizzard conditions; roads were covered with snow and visibility was extremely limited. Throughout the first day the division repelled attacks by Siebert's group along the sector Verkhnie Apochki–Chepelki, but with the onset of darkness the Axis group managed to penetrate this position and threw its units back to the line Degtyarnaya–Yefrosinovka. During the morning of February 7 Siebert's men managed to occupy the latter place as well as several other villages and was joined by the Bruchmann column. By the end of the day the 237th had been pushed back to the line Petrovka–Dubinovka where it blocked the further advance along the road to Repevka. During these two days the Axis groupings managed to gain up to 30km in their struggle to the west.

On February 8 the snowstorm continued. In the morning the division was forced back from its previous line and, following stubborn fighting, withdrew to a line from Korovi Verkhi to Belovskie Dvory to Teplyi where it established contact with elements of the 240th Division. Siebert's group was attempting to break through to Tim but was foiled by the 240th. On the same day elements of 60th Army liberated Kursk, while 40th Army reached Belgorod and completely cleared it on February 9. Meanwhile, Siebert's group, which was moving to the south, was getting into the rear of the 232nd Division and Chibisov ordered Colonel Dyakonov to attack in the direction of Pogozhee and Kuskino and by day's end was engaging Siebert's rearguard in the vicinity of the former place. Despite this assistance the 232nd and 167th Divisions were threatened with encirclement and began pulling back, allowing all three Axis groupings to withdraw through Manturovo in the direction of Solntsevo.

The blizzard finally abated on February 10. It had caused serious difficulties in keeping the Red Army units supplied with ammunition, in particular, although it had also forced the Axis groups to abandon their artillery and vehicles. The 237th, along with the 96th Tank Brigade, was ordered to attack at dawn from the line Pogozhee–Lisii Kolodez in the direction of Manturovo with the task of capturing it by day's end and thus cutting the escape route to Solntsevo. The division fought all day with rearguards to capture Pogozhee, but due to the shortage of bullets and shells and the tanks lagging behind, it was unable to capture the place completely. The next day it became clear to Chibisov that the Axis columns were slipping away and urged his forces onward. The 240th Division cut the path of the Bruchmann group on February 12 and largely destroyed it with the assistance of the 237th in the Manturovo area. Meanwhile, the other two groups reached Oboyan and Pselets. Most of the remainder of the Axis forces prepared to defend Oboyan. Chibisov now ordered his forces to encircle and destroy the Axis garrison of that town in preparation for a renewed offensive on Sumy, 100 km to the southwest. By the end of February 16 Oboyan was already partly encircled by three rifle divisions, including the 237th, and a brigade. Chibisov planned to take the town in an attack from three sides on February 18 but on the day before, anticipating the attack, the Axis garrison staged a hasty retreat. In the end only a few thousand men of the original encircled Axis force managed to escape.

== Battle of Kursk ==
German plan of attack at Kursk. The position of 40th Army is shown in the lower center section of the salient.

On February 4 Dyakonov was promoted to the rank of major general. By the end of February the German Army Group South was well into its counteroffensive but this did not directly threaten 38th Army before it shut down in mid-March. Later that month the 237th was transferred to 40th Army, still in Voronezh Front. In early May the STAVKA made its decision to stand on the defensive within the Kursk salient which was occupied by the Central and Voronezh Fronts. The new commander of the latter, Army Gen. N. F. Vatutin, reported as follows on May 11:

The forces of the Voronezh Front are ready to carry out their defensive assignments. All of the rifle divisions of the 38th, 40th, 6th Guards and 7th Guards Armies, with very few exceptions, each have 8,000 or more men... The main portion of arms has arrived by railroad in the last few days. Thus the bulk of the weapons will be issued to the troops by the end of 14.5.1943.

40th Army, commanded by Lt. Gen. K. S. Moskalenko, was assigned a front 50km wide between 38th and 6th Guards Armies. At the outset of the battle the 237th was in the second echelon with the 161st and 309th Rifle Divisions. It was due to become part of the 47th Rifle Corps but this did not occur until after the German offensive began.

The division manned, apart from other defenses, an antitank reserve consisting of four 45mm antitank guns and 44 antitank rifles. In the event, since the main attack of the 4th Panzer Army fell on the positions of the 6th and 7th Guards Armies to the east the 40th Army saw little action during Operation Zitadelle; on July 7 Vatutin sent Moskalenko a warning order for a flank attack towards Tomarovka, but this was soon revised to a transfer of most of 40th Army's armor and heavy artillery to bolster 6th Guards and 1st Tank Armies and a feint attack in support. Little of this affected the 237th on the opposite flank.

=== Belgorod-Kharkov Offensive Operation ===
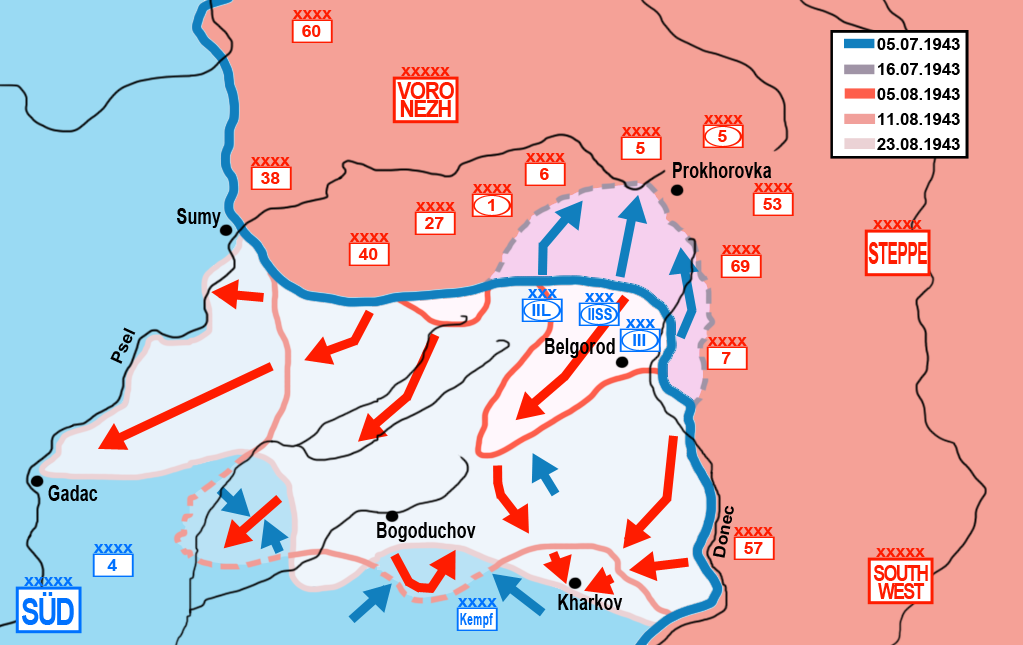
Belgorod-Kharkov Offensive Operation. Note direction of advance of 40th Army.

After the German offensive came to a halt in mid-July the STAVKA made its long-delayed plans for its own summer offensive. Voronezh and Steppe Fronts would attack to regain Belgorod and then push towards Kharkov and the Dniepr River. 40th Army was to attack with its shock group, consisting of the 206th and 100th Divisions, the 2nd Tank Corps, a Guards heavy tank regiment, and a large number of supporting antitank, artillery and mortar units. This group deployed along an 8km front between Vysokii and Kresanov, while the 237th, operating along the Army's right flank, had the mission of tying down the German forces along the front from Uspenskoe to Vysokii.

The overall offensive began on August 3 but did not involve 27th and 40th Armies until August 5. The 40th's shock group attacked at 0715 hours, following a two-hour artillery preparation against the positions of the German 57th Infantry Division, which had been severely damaged in the Kastornoye pocket months before. Its resistance was soon crushed; the two Soviet armies broke through along a 26km-wide sector and by the end of the day had advanced from 8km-12km, reaching a line from Starosele to Kasilovo to Ivanovskaya Lisitsa to Nikitskoye despite counterattacks by 11th Panzer Division which were beaten off. What remained of the 57th Infantry pulled back to Tomarovka.

Following this success 40th Army was ordered to advance in the direction of Trostyanets with 47th Army, still in Front reserve, coming up behind. On August 6, 40th Army's shock group fought against the 323rd Infantry Division in the Dorogoshch area. It quickly broke the German defenses and began rolling them up towards the west, reaching a line from Krasnopole to Popovka to Slavgorodok. Army Group South now committed the 7th Panzer and Großdeutschland Divisions in an attempt to stop the 40th and 27th Armies. During August 8–11 40th Army attacked towards Boromlya. On the first day it pushed aside remnants of 11th Panzer, as well as 57th and 323rd Infantry, and took the area around Zhigaylovka by the end of the day. By August 9 it was facing increasing resistance; its right flank units advanced 4–5km and captured a German stronghold at Chernetchina. Meanwhile, the 10th Tank Corps, operating in cooperation with the Army, broke through the German defense, covered 20km, and seized Trostyanets.

On August 10 the 40th Army advanced another 10–12km and captured Grebennikovka and Boromlya. Its left flank units were engaged in stubborn fighting in Trostyanets, beating back counterattacks by Großdeutschland well into the next day. During August 12–16 the 38th and 40th Armies were fighting along a line from Verkhnyaya Syrovatka to Trostyanets and were unable to advance. The offensive was renewed on the morning of August 17 with the commitment of 47th Army from the reserve, relieving the 237th and 309th Divisions which comprised the 52nd Rifle Corps. The Corps, along with 2nd Tank Corps, now occupied the line from Kamennoe State Farm to Bratskii. With this regrouping 40th Army was split into two groups, each operating independently on 47th Army's flanks. Following a 50-minute artillery and air bombardment the combined forces of the three Armies broke through the German defense and advanced 10–12km, reaching a line from Bezdrik to Velikii Istorop. The next day 47th Army advanced another 20km, after which it was ordered to cut the road from Lebedyn to Akhtyrka to help isolate the group of German forces massed around the latter place. This was accomplished on August 19.

The 47th and part of 40th Army engaged in heavy fighting on August 20 with German forces transferred from Akhtyrka and made a further advance of between 5 and 10km. This cut the last road to that town from the west. The 40th's right-flank forces, having defeated the German Lebedyn grouping and having gone over to an energetic offensive, advanced during the day to the southwest along the Psel River to a depth of 35km and captured Veprik. Over the next three days the German Akhtyrka grouping was defeated and the town was liberated. By the end of August 27 the right-flank armies of Voronezh Front had reached a line to the south as far as Kotelva. From here the Front was to undertake a new offensive to the west toward Gadyach and to the south toward Poltava. The previous day General Dyakonov had left his command and sent for treatment due to illness in a Moscow hospital. After his recovery he was assigned to the training establishment where he remained until his retirement in January 1959. He was briefly replaced by Colonel Novozhilov until the division was taken over by Col. Pyotr Markovich Marol on September 3.

== Battle of the Dniepr ==
During the next weeks the defeated German forces fell back through Ukraine as a race developed to reach the crossing points along the Dniepr River. On September 18 the 237th shared credit with the 309th Division for the liberation of the city of Pyriatyn, and was given its name as an honorific:

PIRYATIN - The 52nd Rifle Corps... with its components, 237th Rifle Division (Col. Marol, Pyotr Markovich)... By order of the Supreme High Command is given this name.

Two days later the division was recorded as having 5,340 personnel on strength, armed with a total of 107 guns and mortars, making it one of the strongest in 40th Army. During the last week of the month it was approaching Bukryn west of the Dniepr north of Kaniv. On September 23 General Moskalenko wrote to his 47th and 52nd Corps: "The Dnepr River must be forced in the most favorable places, without regard for boundary lines and available crossing equipment." On the same day units of the 52nd Corps, including the division, began crossing northwest and southeast of Rzhyshchiv near Staiki, Grebeni and Shchuchinka but only with infantry and at a slow pace. Overnight two airborne brigades were dropped in the Kanev area but had little effect on the overall operation. Despite this failure by September 25 the Bukryn bridgehead was about 6km in depth and 10–12km wide and by the next day the crossing of 40th Army's infantry was basically completed.

One of the first 13 soldiers of the 835th Rifle Regiment to reach the west bank of the river was Sanitar (medic) Mariya Zakharovna Shcherbachenko, doing so under heavy enemy fire in the village of Grebeni. Immediately after the landing she operated a light machine gun in support of her comrades. Over the following ten days she rescued 112 injured soldiers from the battlefield, providing first aid and transporting them back across the river to an aid station. On October 23 she was made a Hero of the Soviet Union for her role in the bridgehead battle. She continued to serve in the front lines until May 1944 when she was sent to study medicine, but did not graduate. After leaving the Red Army she studied law and later practiced in Kyiv. She was awarded the Florence Nightingale Medal by the International Red Cross in 1973. She died in Kyiv on November 23, 2016 at the age of 94.

=== Rzhyshchiv Bridgehead ===
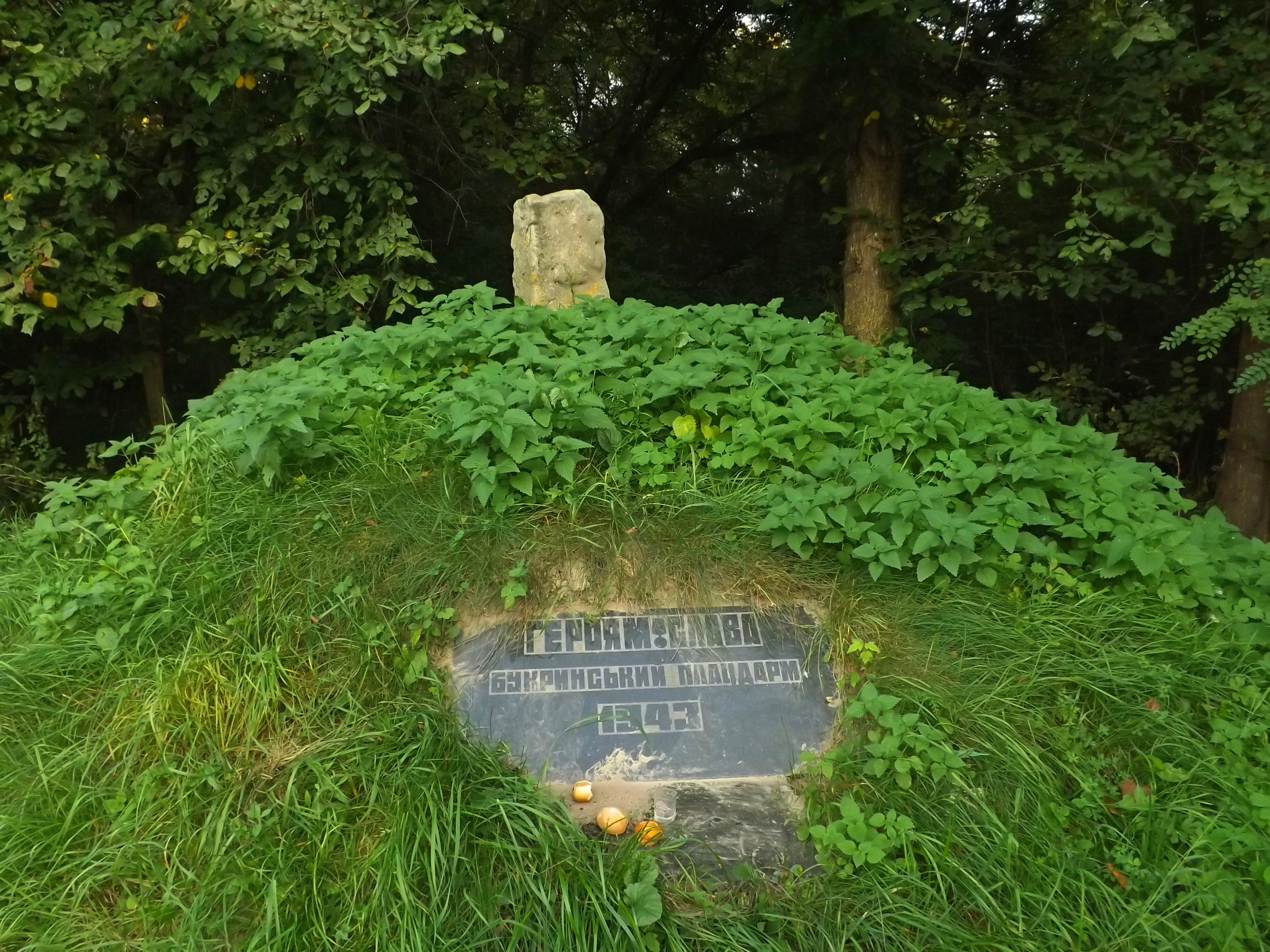
Memorial to the Red Army soldiers who fought in the Bukryn bridgehead

On September 27–29 fierce fighting was waged for the bridgeheads from Staiki as far south as Kaniv as German forces converged on this sector. The Front reserve, 27th Army, was ordered to relieve units of the 40th Army on the sector from Yanivka to Shandra on September 30; meanwhile on the 29th the 52nd Corps was still fighting to expand its bridgeheads on each side of Rzhyshchiv which were now between 11–16km wide and up to 4km deep. It was facing the German 34th Infantry and 10th Motorized Divisions while the 2nd SS Panzer-Grenadier Division Das Reich was approaching the area. German counterattacks followed on October 2 against the 237th and 42nd Guards Rifle Divisions and by the 5th the northwest bridgehead had been effectively abandoned, with just the 838th Regiment left holding near the shoreline northwest of Grebeni. The balance of the division evacuated to the east bank and took up defensive positions. Otherwise the several bridgeheads from Rzhyshchiv to Kaniv held firm as the counterattackers suffered significant losses in men and tanks.

From October 6–11 a period of quiet settled along this front. The Soviet forces prepared to go back to the offensive but were hampered by the ongoing shortage of crossing means and therefore ammunition and heavy equipment; as of October 10 the small bridgehead was reliant on boat crossings for support. By this time the division had been reduced to 4,019 personnel with 63 guns and mortars. The fighting resumed on October 12 in another effort to expand the overall Bukryn bridgehead but this did not directly involve the 237th. The Front commander, Army Gen. N. F. Vatutin, continued to press the offensive until October 16 despite very limited progress. Four days later his Front was redesignated as 1st Ukrainian. By October 23 Vatutin had changed his plan to focus all his Front's efforts on the sectors held by 40th Army and the right flank of 27th Army, but this was cancelled by the STAVKA late on October 24; it had concluded that further efforts to break out of the Bukryn bridgeheads would be futile, largely owing to the difficult terrain. A new offensive was planned to begin on November 3 with the intention to advance instead from the Lyutezh bridgehead north of Kiev.

=== Kiev Strategic Defensive ===
As of the start of November the 237th was back under command of the 47th Corps, still in 40th Army. Colonel Marol left the division on November 1 and was replaced by Maj. Gen. Fyodor Nazarovich Parkhomenko, who had most recently commanded the 128th Rifle Division. The Army was committed to a pinning attack out of the Bukryn area; this diversion began the same day with 40 minutes of artillery and airstrikes and the Corps was able to take the village of Kanada. The fighting continued into November 5 and achieved little more than drawing the 2nd SS out of reserve but by the next day it was clear that Kyiv was about to be liberated from Lyutezh and the 40th and 27th Armies were ordered to maintain the impression of a coming attack with false troop concentrations and dummy tanks. On the night of November 11/12 the headquarters of 47th Corps was withdrawn from the Bukryn bridgehead and the 237th, 309th and 161st Divisions were transferred to 52nd Corps, which in turn was transferred to 27th Army.

As the right flank forces of 1st Ukrainian Front pushed westward following the liberation of Kyiv they came under counterattack from the reinforced 4th Panzer Army. In order to reinforce the Brusyliv axis on November 15 the 237th and 100th Divisions were transferred back to 40th Army. In the fluid situation that continued during the remainder of the month the division found itself back in 52nd Corps during the last weeks, now part of 38th Army. By November 25 the Army was defending along the line Stroevka–Stavyshche–Staritskaya–Velikiye Golyaki, facing five panzer and one motorized divisions. At 1000 hours on November 26 the right flank of 52nd Corps, along with two corps of 60th and 1st Guards Armies, went over to the attack, but this was unsuccessful. By now 38th Army was worn out by its previous exertions; as an example, on November 15 the 237th was down to 3,409 personnel and 48 guns and mortars.

== Into Western Ukraine ==
By the beginning of the new year the division had been withdrawn into the reserves of 1st Ukrainian Front for rest and rebuilding. Later in January it was assigned to 74th Rifle Corps, back in 38th Army, where it remained at the start of the Proskurov-Chernivtsi operation. On February 9 the 691st Artillery Regiment was awarded the Order of the Red Banner. When the offensive began on March 4 the Army was on the left (south) flank of the Front, with the immediate objective of Vinnytsia. By March 6 a gap nearly 150km wide had been torn between the 1st and 4th Panzer Armies. Two days later Hitler issued his Order No. 11, which designated certain towns and cities as "fortified places" which were to hold fast to the last man; one such place was Zhmerynka. By March 11 the 38th Army, temporarily under command of 2nd Ukrainian Front, rolled up the 1st Panzer Army's flank toward Vinnytsia and pushed on toward the "fortified place". At about this time the 237th was shifted to 67th Rifle Corps, which liberated Zhmerynka in fighting from March 18-20. In recognition, the division as a whole would be awarded the Order of the Red Banner. Following this the Army continued advancing toward Kamianets-Podilskyi. On March 30 the encirclement of 1st Panzer Army was completed, but this was broken from the outside by II SS Panzer Corps and 1st Panzer managed to escape across the Seret River. By this time 38th Army had returned to 1st Ukrainian Front.

=== Lvov–Sandomierz Offensive ===
During April the 237th was reassigned to the 18th Guards Rifle Corps, still in 38th Army. On May 16 General Parkhomenko left the division and was hospitalized; after he recovered in July he was appointed deputy commander of the 101st Rifle Corps before going on to lead the 121st and then the 340th Rifle Divisions. The 237th was taken over by Hero of the Soviet Union Maj. Gen. Dmitrii Feoktisovich Dryomin. This officer had previously commanded the 107th, 309th and 316th Rifle Divisions and had won his Gold Star in the Dniepr operation. By the beginning of July the 18th Guards Corps had been moved to 1st Guards Army, still in 1st Ukrainian Front.

In the regrouping that preceded the offensive the Front command decided to widen the sectors held by the 1st Guards and 13th Armies in order to concentrate several other armies on attack sectors. 1st Guards took over the entire sector held by 38th Army and part of that held by 60th Army. When the offensive began on July 13 the 1st Guards Army was deployed on a 118km-wide sector with 17 rifle divisions, of which 5 were in reserve, including the 237th. The Army was assigned a supporting role in the offensive, prepared to back up 38th Army to its north with its reserve divisions and the 4th Guards Tank Corps once that Army penetrated the German front. From July 14-20 the Front's northern armies successfully penetrated the deep German defenses on the Rava-Ruska and Lvov axes and with all available German reserves committed or already destroyed the Front prepared to expand the offensive on the direction of Drohobych. 1st Guards and 18th Armies had been fighting local actions during this first week in order to pin German forces in place.

1st Guards Army went over to the general offensive on the morning of July 21 and after dislodging the rearguards advanced from 6-22km during the day. The Army's commander, Col. Gen. A. A. Grechko, was now ordered to develop an aggressive offensive and capture Stanislav by the end of July 24. From July 24-26 the Army continued to advance against stubborn resistance and took Stanislav on the 27th. In recognition of its part in this victory the 691st Artillery Regiment (Lt. Col. Ivan Ivanovich Bogatyrev) was awarded the city's name as an honorific. In August the 1st Guards Army, along with 18th Guards Corps, was assigned to 4th Ukrainian Front, which was preparing to enter the Carpathian Mountains. The division would remain under command of this Front for the duration of the war. General Dryomin would leave the division on September 18 to become deputy commander of 30th Rifle Corps. He was replaced by Col. Mikhail Grigorovich Tetenko, who would lead it until after the German surrender.

== Into Czechoslovakia ==
Beginning on September 9 the Front attempted to break through the positions of 1st Panzer Army into the Dukla Pass in the Laborec Highlands toward Uzhhorod. This made slow progress to begin with but by the start of October began to make headway in part due to the removal of a panzer division and on October 6 the pass was taken. At this time the 237th was serving in 30th Corps. By the 14th the Front was on the move again, slowly advancing south of Dukla Pass through German fortified positions; 1st Guards Army was attempting to force some of the smaller passes farther east. On October 26 the division played an important role in the liberation of Mukachevo and the 835th Rifle Regiment (Lt. Col. Ignat Ivanovich Podoprigora) received its name as an honorific, while the division as a whole was decorated with the Order of Suvorov, 2nd Degree, on November 14.

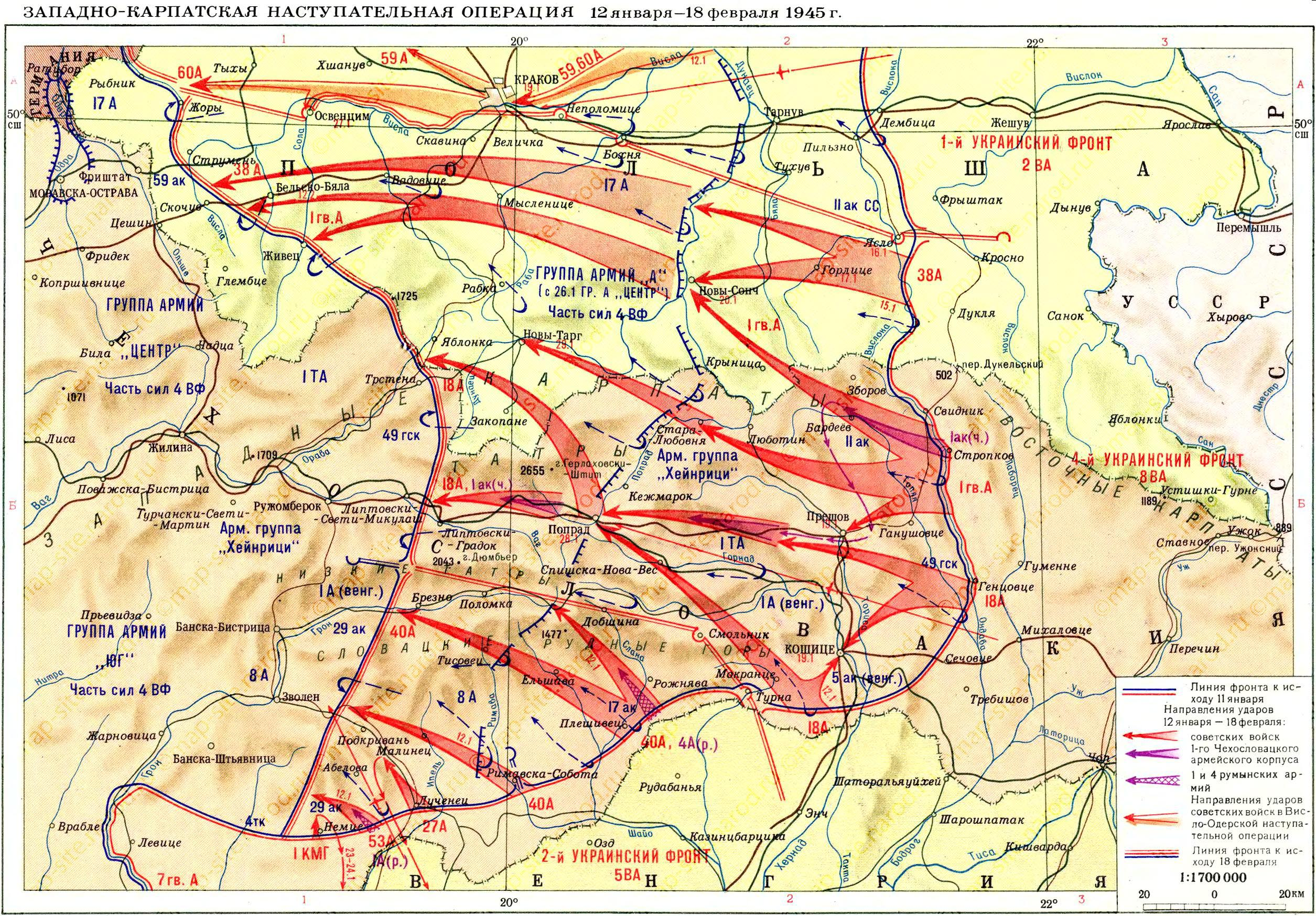
Western Carpathian Offensive. Note positions of 18th Army.

As of the start of November the division was part of 17th Guards Rifle Corps, which was in the Front reserve. Later that month the Corps was moved to 18th Army, but the 237th came under direct Army command. In December it came back under 17th Guards Corps command. Beginning on January 12, 1945 it took part in the Western Carpathian Offensive, mostly facing the German XXXXIX Mountain Corps; on January 20 the division assisted in the capture of the city of Košice and one regiment was awarded an honorific:

KOSICE... 838th Rifle Regiment (Major Natenov, Pyotr Borisovich)... The troops who participated in the liberation of Košice and nearby towns, by the order of the Supreme High Command of 20 January 1945, and a commendation in Moscow, are given a salute of 20 artillery salvoes from 224 guns.

For their parts in the fighting for this city and others, on February 19 the division as a whole would receive the Order of Bogdan Khmelnitsky, 2nd Degree, while the 835th Regiment was decorated with the Order of the Red Banner and the 841st Regiment won the Order of Suvorov, 3rd Degree.

Within a few days of the battle for Košice the 237th was again reassigned, now to the 95th Rifle Corps in the Front reserve, but before the start of the Moravia–Ostrava Offensive on March 10 it had moved again, to 11th Rifle Corps in 1st Guards Army. By the start of April it was in the Army's 107th Rifle Corps; the advance crossed the upper reaches of the Oder River but was then held up by German resistance east of Frenštát pod Radhoštěm until April 5. By the time of the German surrender the division was on the approaches to Olomouc, serving as a separate division in 1st Guards Army.

== Postwar ==
The men and women of the division ended the war with the full title of 237th Rifle, Piryatin, Order of the Red Banner, Orders of Suvorov and Bogdan Khmelnitsky Division. (Russian: 237-я стрелковая Пирятинская Краснознамённая орденов Суворова и Богдана Хмельницкого дивизия.) On June 4 further distinctions were awarded to several of the division's subunits. The 841st Regiment was given the Order of the Red Banner while the 835th and 838th Regiments each received the Order of Suvorov, 3rd Degree, all for the liberation of Cieszyn. Meanwhile, the 691st Artillery won the Order of Bogdan Khmelnitsky, 2nd Degree, and the 5th Antitank Battalion was awarded the same Order in 3rd Degree for the fighting for Bohumín, Frenštát, and other towns.

Before these were awarded, on May 29 the STAVKA issued Order No. 11097, which stated in sections 5 and 8 that the division, along with most of 1st Guards Army, was to be moved to the Northern Group of Forces in the region of Częstochowa before being disbanded to provide replacements for the remaining divisions. In accordance with this order the 237th was disbanded in July.
