= Sergey Gorshkov (general) =

Soviet lieutenant general (1902–1993)

Sergey Ilyich Gorshkov
- Gorshkov, c. 1945
- Born: 20 September 1902; Olshanka, Don Host Oblast, Russian Empire
- Died: 25 June 1993 (aged 90) Rostov-on-Don, Russia
- Allegiance: Russian SFSR; Soviet Union
- Branch: Red Army
- Service years: 1920–1946
- Rank: Lieutenant general
- Commands: 206th Rifle Division; 15th Cavalry Division (became 11th Guards Cavalry Division); 5th Guards Cavalry Corps
- Conflicts: Russian Civil War; World War II
- Awards: Order of Lenin (2); Order of the Red Banner (4); Order of Kutuzov, 1st class; Order of Suvorov, 2nd class; Order of Bogdan Khmelnitsky, 2nd class; Order of the Patriotic War, 1st class

Sergey Ilyich Gorshkov (Russian: Сергей Ильич Горшков; 20 September 1902 – 25 June 1993) was a Red Army lieutenant general who held division and corps command during World War II.

Gorshkov served in the final stages of the Russian Civil War as a cadet, holding command and staff positions with cavalry units in Ukraine during the interwar period. When Operation Barbarossa began, he was commander of the 206th Rifle Division, which was destroyed during the Battle of Kiev. Gorshkov escaped the encirclement and was sent to the North Caucasus to command the new 15th Cavalry Division. Decorated for his command of the division, converted into the 11th Guards Cavalry Division, in the Battle of the Caucasus, Gorshkov served as a corps deputy commander during 1943 and early 1944. Afterwards, he became commander of the 5th Guards Cavalry Corps, which he led for the remainder of the war. Due to illness, Gorshkov retired shortly after its end.

== Early life and Russian Civil War ==
Gorshkov was born on 20 September 1902 on the khutor of Olshanka, Don Host Oblast. During the Russian Civil War, the area was occupied by the Armed Forces of South Russia until August 1919, and Gorshkov remained engaged in agricultural work. Conscripted into the Red Army in September 1920, he was sent to study at the 7th Borisoglebsk Cavalry Course. With a cadet detachment drawn from the course, Gorshkov fought in the suppression of the Tambov Rebellion as a squad leader. For his actions in the fighting, he was awarded the Order of the Red Banner.

== Interwar period ==
Resuming his studies in September 1921 after the merger of the Borisoglebsk Course into what became the 2nd Borisoglebsk-Petrograd Cavalry School, Gorshkov graduated a year later and was appointed a platoon commander in the 73rd Rifle Regiment of the 25th Rifle Division and the divisional cavalry squadron, stationed at Chigirin, Kremenchug, and Poltava. In April 1926 he was transferred to the 51st Cavalry Regiment of the 9th Cavalry Division at Gaisin, with which he served successively as a platoon commander in the regimental school, squadron political officer, squadron commander and political officer, and assistant regimental chief of staff. Gorshkov became chief of the 4th department of the 9th Cavalry Division staff in May 1932 and graduated from the staff department of the Cavalry Commanders' Improvement Course (KUKS) in the next year.

Appointed chief of the regimental school for junior commanders of the 52nd Cavalry Regiment of the division in June 1933, Gorshkov returned to the division staff in October 1935 as assistant chief of the 1st section. Transferring back to the 52nd to serve as its chief of staff in April 1936, he became commander of the 49th Cavalry Regiment of the division in September 1937. After being appointed assistant commander of the 14th Cavalry Division in April 1938, Gorshkov served as chief of the personnel department of the staff of the Kiev Special Military District from August of that year. Transferred to serve in the same position on the Odessa Military District staff in July 1940, he was appointed commander of the 206th Rifle Division of the 7th Rifle Corps as a colonel on 11 March 1941.

== World War II ==
After Operation Barbarossa began, Gorshkov led the division in the border battles as part of the Southwestern Front and in the Battle of Kiev. The 206th was encircled and destroyed beginning on 22 September. Gorshkov reached Soviet lines in the sector of the 21st Army on 20 November, still armed and in uniform with his documents and decorations. Wounded in the head, he was carried out of the encirclement by his adjutant and a nurse. Later that month, he was appointed commander of the 15th Don Cossack Cavalry Division, forming in the North Caucasus. In July 1942 the division joined the North Caucasian Front and fought in the Battle of the Caucasus. For distinguishing itself, the division was converted into the 11th Guards Cavalry Division on 27 August, while Gorshkov received the Order of Lenin for his leadership, continuing in command of the 11th Guards. In late 1942 it joined the Black Sea Group of Forces of the Transcaucasian Front, defending the passes of the Greater Caucasus and then in actions in the Rostov-on-Don region. He was evaluated as a "competent, bold, and decisive commander" by his superiors for his leadership of the division.

Gorshkov served as deputy commander of the 5th Guards Don Cossack Cavalry Corps of the Southern Front from May 1943. During the Donbass Strategic Offensive in September, the corps broke through German defenses on the Kalmius, recapturing Volnovakha and Gulyai Pole. Transferred to serve in the same capacity with the 4th Guards Cavalry Corps on 19 November 1943, Gorshkov, promoted to major general in December, participated with it in the Bereznegovatoye–Snigirevka Offensive and the raid on the Axis rear at Odessa in March 1944 as part of the Cavalry-Mechanized Group of the 3rd Ukrainian Front, under the command of General Issa Pliyev.

On 3 April Gorshkov was appointed commander of the 5th Guards Cavalry Corps of the 2nd Ukrainian Front. Gorshkov led the corps in the Second Jassy–Kishinev Offensive and the Debrecen Offensive, during which it captured Târgu Frumos, Roman, Bacău, Debrecen, and Nyíregyháza. He was promoted to lieutenant general on 13 September. In October he commanded the Cavalry-Mechanized Group of the 2nd Ukrainian Front, which included his corps and the 23rd Tank Corps, then returned to command of the corps during the Budapest Offensive. Gorshkov led the corps in the Vienna Offensive in the final weeks of the war.

== Postwar ==
After the end of the war, Gorshkov continued to command the corps. From March 1946 he studied at the Higher Academic Course of the Voroshilov Higher Military Academy, but was retired due to illness on 8 November of that year after completing the course. Gorshkov lived in Rostov-on-Don, where he died on 25 June 1993.

== Awards and honors ==
Gorshkov was a recipient of the following decorations:

- Order of Lenin (2)
- Order of the Red Banner (4)
- Order of Kutuzov, 1st class
- Order of Suvorov, 2nd class
- Order of Bogdan Khmelnitsky, 2nd class
- Order of the Patriotic War, 1st class
- Medals
- Foreign orders

A prospekt in Rostov-on-Don is named for Gorshkov.
