= Alexey Selivanov =

Red Army general

Alexey Gordeyevich Selivanov
- Selivanov, c. 1942
- Born: 17 March 1900; Kuzmino-Gat, Tambov Governorate, Russian Empire
- Died: 4 June 1949 (aged 49) Yalta, Crimean Oblast, RSFSR, Soviet Union
- Allegiance: Russian SFSR; Soviet Union
- Branch: Red Army
- Service years: 1918–1946
- Rank: Lieutenant general
- Commands: 23rd Cavalry Division; 15th Cavalry Corps; 5th Guards Cavalry Corps
- Conflicts: Russian Civil War; World War II
- Awards: Order of Lenin; Order of the Red Banner (4); Order of Suvorov, 2nd class; Order of Kutuzov, 2nd class; Order of Bogdan Khmelnitsky, 2nd class

Alexey Gordeyevich Selivanov (Russian: Алексей Гордеевич Селиванов; 17 March 1900 – 4 June 1949) was a Red Army lieutenant general who held division and corps command during World War II.

Selivanov served in the Russian Civil War as an artilleryman and cavalry cadet, and held command and staff positions with cavalry units during the interwar period. A division chief of staff when Operation Barbarossa began, he commanded the 23rd Cavalry Division in the Anglo-Soviet invasion of Iran a few months later. Selivanov served an army deputy commander in the Battle of the Caucasus and was appointed commander of the new 5th Guards Cavalry Corps in late 1942. He led the corps in the final stages of the Battle of the Caucasus, the Donbass Strategic Offensive, and the Uman–Botoșani Offensive, among other operations, but gave up command due to his tuberculosis in early 1944. Selivanov never returned to active duty and died of the disease several years later.

== Early life and Russian Civil War ==
A Russian, Alexey Gordeyevich Selivanov was born on 17 March 1900 in the village of Kuzmino-Gat, Tambov Governorate. Conscripted into the Red Army in March 1918, Selivanov became a Red Army man in the 3rd Light Battery of the 16th Rifle Division. In August 1918 he was sent to become a cadet at the regimental school of the 7th Volga Cavalry Regiment at Samara, and after graduating from it entered the 3rd Orenburg Cavalry Command Course in January 1920. During the war, he participated in fighting in the Southern and Eastern Fronts, and for distinguishing himself was awarded the Order of the Red Banner on 20 November 1920.

== Interwar period ==
After completing the cavalry command course, Selivanov was placed at the disposal of the chief of the Ural District Directorate of Higher Educational Institutions in May 1921 and appointed a platoon commander with the 20th Yekaterinburg Course. From January 1922 he commanded a platoon and later a squadron at the 25th Cavalry Course, then commanded platoons at the 24th Ufa, 20th, and 3rd Omsk Cavalry Courses. In February 1924 he was transferred to the 4th Tashkent Combined Military School, where he served as a platoon commander and assistant squadron commander. Selivanov entered the three-year Higher Central Asian Oriental Studies Course in October 1925, and after completing it was appointed assistant chief of the operations section of the staff of the 7th Separate Cavalry Brigade of the Central Asian Military District at Stalinabad.

After completing the Special Course under the Intelligence Directorate of the Staff of the Red Army between October 1929 and August 1930, Selivanov was appointed chief of a border intelligence post of the Intelligence Department of the Central Asian Military District staff at Kirovabad, Tajikistan. He became assistant chief of a sector of the department in March 1933, and from June 1934 to December 1938 was at the disposal of the Intelligence Directorate. After completing a course at the Frunze Military Academy in 1938, Selivanov was appointed assistant chief of staff of the 4th Cavalry Division, stationed in the Belorussian Special Military District. In January 1940 he was transferred to the Transcaucasian Military District to serve in the same capacity with the 24th Cavalry Division at Kirovabad, Azerbaijan. With the division, he fought in the Winter War.

== World War II and death ==
After Operation Barbarossa began, Selivanov, by now a colonel, remained with the 24th. Selected to command the 23rd Cavalry Division by an order of the district on 8 August, he led it in the invasion of Iran as part of the 47th Army between 25 August and 5 September. Remaining in Iran with the division, Selivanov became deputy commander of the 15th Cavalry Corps in Iran on 1 January 1942 and simultaneously fulfilled the duties of corps commander until 18 March. Promoted to major general, Selivanov was appointed deputy chief of staff and chief of the operations department of the Transcaucasian Front staff in May 1942. Serving as deputy commander of the 44th Army of the front from July, he held the same position in the 9th Army from October.

Selivanov was appointed commander of the newly formed 5th Guards Cavalry Corps in November 1942. He led it as part of the 51st Army of the Southern Front in the Battle of the Caucasus, during which it broke through Axis defenses on the Kuma and captured Belaya Glina. In September 1943 the corps fought in the Donbass Strategic Offensive, breaking through German defenses on the Kalmius and capturing Volnovakha and Gulyaipole. Subsequently, the corps captured Golaya Pristan and Tsyurupinsk. Selivanov was promoted to lieutenant general on 18 February 1944 and led the corps in the Uman–Botoșani Offensive, in which it captured Orhei. For his "successful leadership of operations and display of true heroism at critical moments" in the offensive, Selivanov was awarded the Order of Suvorov, 2nd class. He went to a sanatorium in Crimea to treat his tuberculosis in April and did not return to duty. Retired due to his illness on 12 February 1949, Selivanov died of the disease in Yalta a few months later, on 4 June.

== Awards and honors ==
Selivanov was a recipient of the following decorations:

- Order of Lenin (21 February 1945, for length of service)
- Order of the Red Banner (4)
- Order of Suvorov, 2nd class
- Order of Kutuzov, 2nd class
- Order of Bogdan Khmelnitsky, 2nd class
- Medals
