= Olshanka, Volgograd Oblast =

Olshanka Ольшанка
- Khutor
- Location within Volgograd Oblast Location within Russia
- Coordinates: 50°49′N 42°02′E
- Country: Russia
- Region: Volgograd Oblast
- District: Uryupinsky District
- Time zone: UTC+4:00

Olshanka (Russian: Ольшанка) is a rural locality (a khutor) and the administrative center of Olshanskoye Rural Settlement, Uryupinsky District, Volgograd Oblast, Russia. The population was 1,763 as of 2010. There are 19 streets.

== Geography ==
Olshanka is located in steppe, 4 km northeast of Uryupinsk (the district's administrative centre) by road. Popov is the nearest rural locality.
