= 5th Guards Cavalry Corps =

- Active: December 1942–May 1946
- Country: Soviet Union
- Branch: Red Army
- Type: Cavalry corps
- Engagements: World War II
- Decorations: Order of the Red Banner
- Honorifics: Budapest

Commanders
- Notable commanders: Alexey Selivanov; Sergey Gorshkov

The 5th Guards Don Cossack Cavalry Corps (Russian: 5-й гвардейский кавалерийский Донской казачий корпус) was a cavalry corps of the Red Army during World War II.

== History ==
The corps was formed on 19 November 1942 as the 5th Guards Don Cossack Cavalry Corps, assigned to the Northern Group of Forces of the Transcaucasian Front. Under the command of Major General Alexey Selivanov, the corps was assigned the 11th and 12th Guards Don Cossack Cavalry Divisions, the 63rd Cavalry Division, and other units. Its divisions had already seen combat during the Battle of the Caucasus in the preceding months. The corps entered battle as a unit for the first time in early December in the region of Mozdok. Between January and May 1943 it fought as part of the North Caucasian Front and later the Southern Front with a cavalry-mechanized group.

Between September and November the corps fought as part of the Southern Front (renamed the 4th Ukrainian Front on 20 October) in the breakthrough of the Mius-Front, in which it recaptured Volnovakha on 10 September, Guliaipole on 16 September, Melitopol on 23 October, and Kakhovka on 2 November. In January and February 1944 the corps was shifted to the 2nd Ukrainian Front for the Korsun-Shevchenkovsky Offensive, in which it fought in the encirclement and destruction of German troops. For its "exemplary fulfillment of combat missions" in the fighting for Zvenigorodka on 28 January, and the "courage and bravery" of its personnel, the corps was awarded the Order of the Red Banner on 13 February. During March and April the corps fought in the Uman–Botoșani Offensive. In early April, Selivanov, ill with tuberculosis, was replaced by former corps deputy commander Major General Sergey Gorshkov.

During the Second Jassy–Kishinev Offensive, the corps formed the cavalry-mechanized group of the front together with the 23rd Tank Corps. Swiftly advancing on the right flank of the front, it ensured the advance of the shock group. From October 1944 the corps, transferred to the 3rd Ukrainian Front on 27 November, participated in the Battle of Debrecen. In the attack on Emőd on 13 November, 12th Guards Cavalry Division platoon commander Senior Sergeant Pyotr Grigoryevich Kuznetsov was surrounded, but defended his position to the death. For his actions, Kuznetsov was posthumously awarded the title Hero of the Soviet Union. For "successful combat actions" and its part in the destruction of the Axis forces surrounded in Budapest, the corps received the name of the city as an honorific on 5 April 1945.

The corps saw its last action in the Vienna Offensive in the final weeks of the war. For their actions during the war, roughly 32,000 soldiers of the corps were decorated, and ten became Heroes of the Soviet Union. The corps was disbanded in July 1946.

== Postwar ==
In mid-1945, the 63rd Cavalry Division was reorganized into the 12th Mechanized Division. In late 1945, the corps was withdrawn from the Southern Group of Forces, with which it had been stationed at Ploiești, and relocated to Novocherkassk in the Don Military District with the 11th and 12th Guards Cavalry Divisions. The corps was reorganized as the 5th Separate Guards Cavalry Division in May 1946, with the 7th Guards Cavalry Regiment formed from the 37th Guards Cavalry Regiment, and the 11th and 12th Guards Cavalry Regiments formed from the divisions of the same number. The division also included the 120th Tank Regiment, and remained at Novocherkassk as part of the North Caucasus Military District. Named for Yefim Shchadenko on 6 September 1951, the division was reorganized as the 18th Guards Heavy Tank Division on 18 November 1954, the last remaining cavalry division.
