= Staraya Veduga =

Staraya Veduga Старая Ведуга
- Selo
- Location within Voronezh Oblast Location within Russia
- Coordinates: 51°48′55″N 38°29′17″E
- Country: Russia
- Region: Voronezh Oblast
- District: Semiluksky District
- Time zone: UTC+3:00

Staraya Veduga (Russian: Старая Ведуга) is a rural locality (a selo) and the administrative center of Starovedugskoye Rural Settlement, Semiluksky District, Voronezh Oblast, Russia. The population was 1,211 as of 2010. There are 21 streets.

== Geography ==
Staraya Veduga is located 55 km northwest of Semiluki (the district's administrative centre) by road. Staraya Olshanka is the nearest rural locality.
