= 45 mm anti-tank gun M1942 (M-42) =

Soviet-made military hardware

45-mm anti-tank gun model 1942 года (М-42)
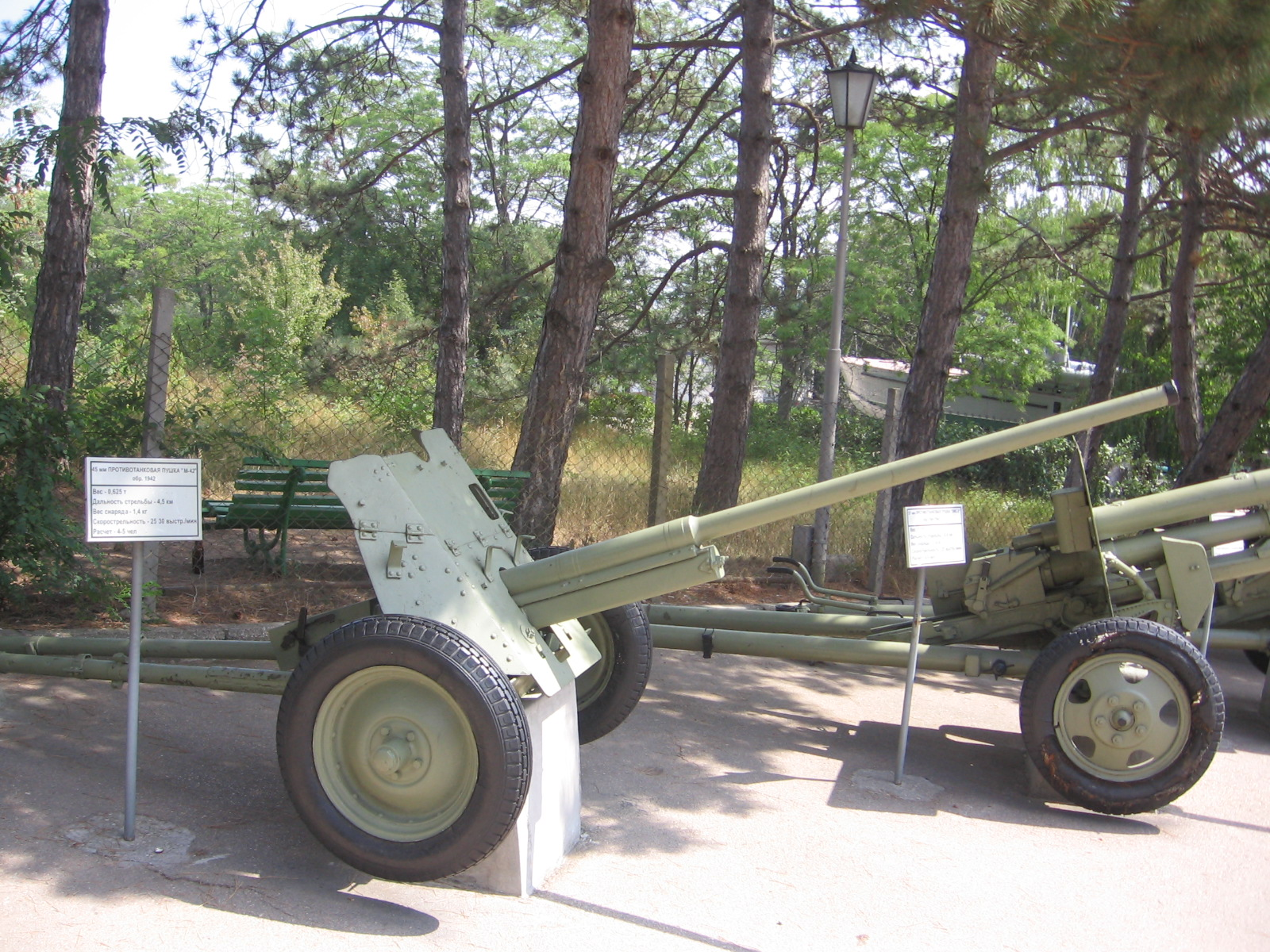
- M-42 in Museum on Sapun Mountain, Sevastopol.
- Type: Anti-tank gun
- Place of origin: Soviet Union

Service history
- Used by: Soviet Union; Warsaw Pact; Russia; North Korea; Romania
- Wars: World War II; Korean War; Russian invasion of Ukraine

Production history
- Designer: No. 172 Plant
- Manufacturer: Artillery Plant #172, at Perm
- Produced: 1942–1945
- No. built: 10,843

Specifications
- Mass: combat: 625 kg (1,378 lbs) travel: 1,250 kg (2,756 lbs)
- Barrel length: 2.985 m (9 ft 9.5 in) 66.3 calibers overall: 3.087 m (10 ft 1.5 in) 68.6 calibers
- Width: 1.6 m (5 ft 3 in)
- Height: 1.2 m (3 ft 11 in)
- Crew: 6
- Shell: Fixed QF 45x310 mmR
- Caliber: 45 mm/ 68 (1.77 in)
- Breech: Semi-automatic vertical sliding wedge
- Recoil: Hydro-spring
- Carriage: Split trail
- Elevation: -8° to 25°
- Traverse: 60°
- Rate of fire: 15-20 rounds per minute
- Muzzle velocity: 870 m/s (2,854 ft/s)
- Maximum firing range: 4.55 km (2.84 mi)

The M-42 was a 45-mm Soviet light semi-automatic anti-tank gun. Its full official name is 45-mm anti-tank gun model 1942 (M-42) (Russian: 45-мм противотанковая пушка образца 1942 года (М-42)). These guns were used from 1942 until the end of World War II. Old stockpiles were returned to service in January 2025 in the Russo-Ukrainian War.

== History ==
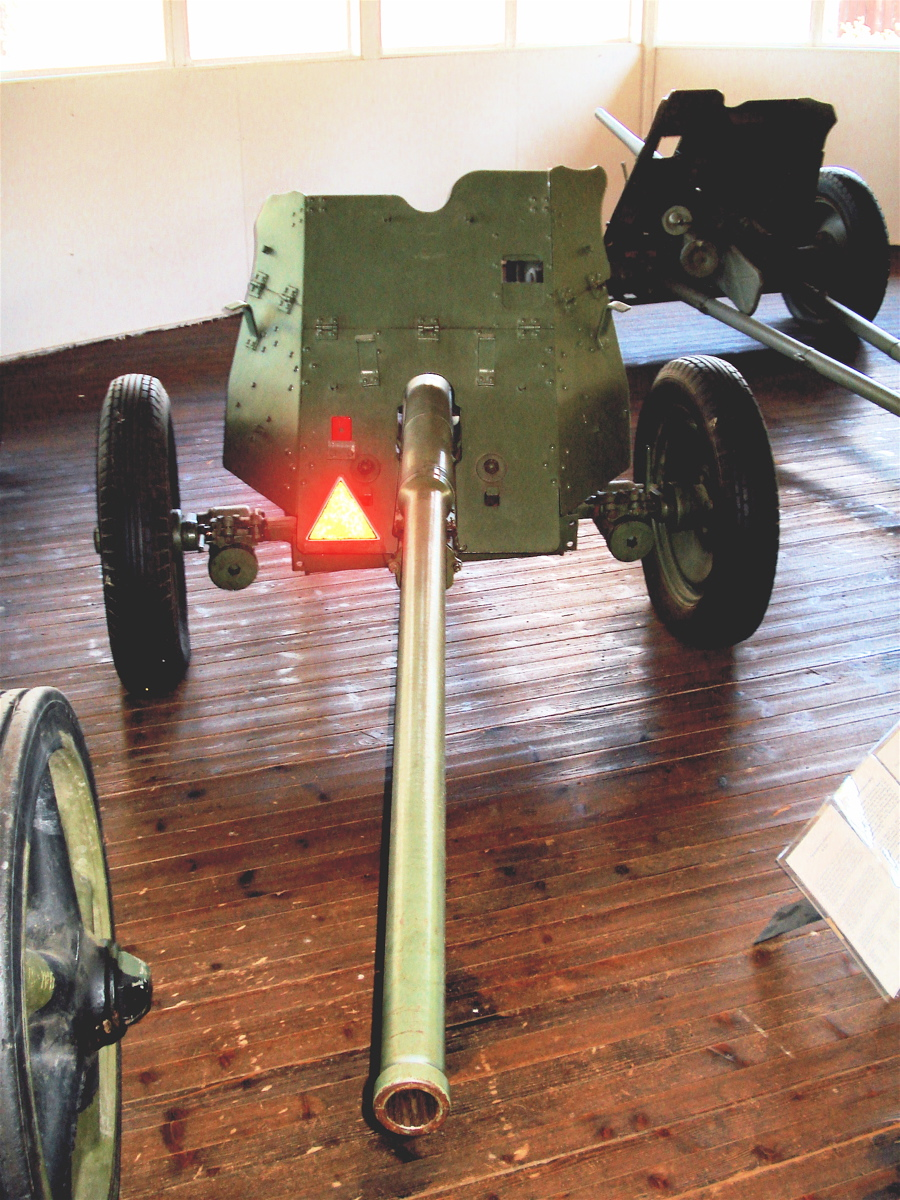
M-42 45 mm anti-tank gun in Finnish Tank Museum in Parola

The M-42 was developed by the No. 172 Plant in Motovilikha as an upgrade of the 45 mm anti-tank gun M1937 (53-K). The gun received a longer barrel (20 calibers more than the previous one, so it was a 45 mm/L66), shells with more powerful cartridges, and a thicker shield (7 mm instead of 4.5 mm), but of hinged construction as a need for reduced profile, requiring crews to kneel while serving the weapon. Some minor changes were also introduced in order to speed up production.

These guns were used from 1942 until the end of World War II. In 1943, due to its insufficient anti-armor capabilities against new German tanks such as the Tiger, Panther and Panzer IV Ausf H, the M-42 was partially replaced in mass production by the more powerful 57 mm ZiS-2 anti-tank gun. The M-42 remained in production however, as it was quite effective against lighter vehicles and could pierce the side armour of the Panther and Panzer IV Ausf H. Fragmentation shells and canister shot gave the gun some anti-personnel capability.

Mass production of the M-42 ceased in mid-1945. The total number of guns produced is 10,843.

== Reintroduction into service ==
On the 24th of January 2025 a video appeared of an M-42 gun being destroyed by a Ukrainian drone operator in the occupied Russian territory in the province of Kursk. This indicates that some of these guns have reentered service with the Russian armed forces.

== Ammunition ==
- Ammunition types:
  - Armor-piercing
  - Fragmentation
  - Canister
  - Smoke
- Projectile weight:
  - AP: 1.43 kg (3.15 lbs)
  - APCR: 0.85 kg (1.87 lbs)
  - Fragmentation: 2.14 kg (4.71 lbs)

== Performance ==
Penetration
Type	100 m (110 yd)	500 m (550 yd)	1,000 m (1,100 yd)	1,500 m (1,600 yd)	2,000 m (2,200 yd)
APBC-HE	71 mm (2.8 in)	54 mm (2.1 in)	40 mm (1.6 in)	32 mm (1.3 in)	28 mm (1.1 in)
APCR	108 mm (4.3 in)	74 mm (2.9 in)	46 mm (1.8 in)	-	-
