= Dorogoshch =

Dorogoshch Дорогощь
- Selo
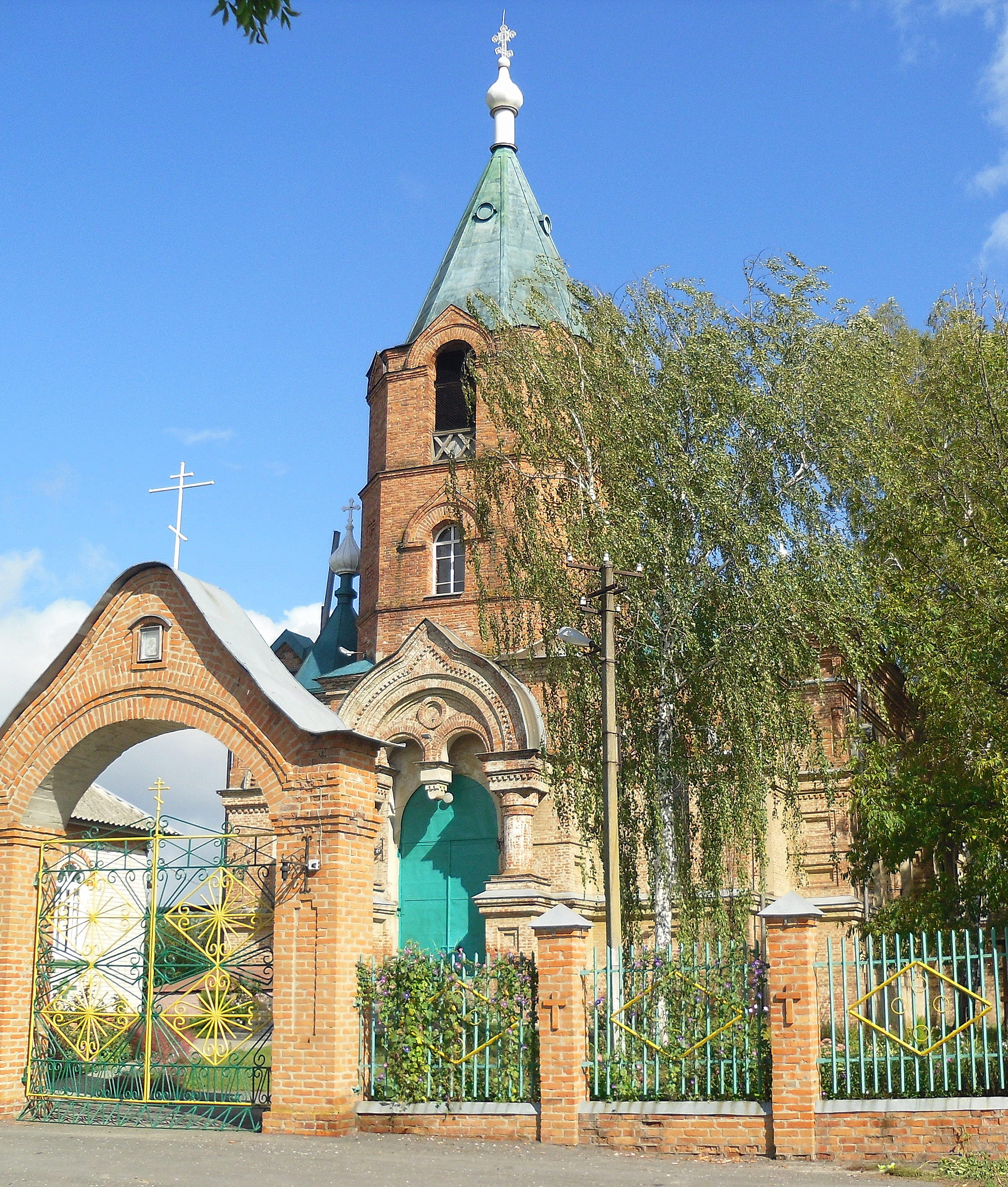

- Location within Belgorod Oblast Location within Russia
- Coordinates: 50°34′N 35°34′E
- Country: Russia
- Region: Belgorod Oblast
- District: Grayvoronsky District
- Time zone: UTC+3:00

Dorogoshch (Russian: Дорогощь) is a rural locality (a selo) and the administrative center of Dorogoshchanskoye Rural Settlement, Grayvoronsky District, Belgorod Oblast, Russia. The population was 698 as of 2010. There are 16 streets.

== Geography ==
Dorogoshch is located 15 km northwest of Grayvoron (the district's administrative centre) by road. Sankovo is the nearest rural locality.
