= Zhigaylovka =

Zhigaylovka Жигайловка
- Selo
- Location within Belgorod Oblast Location within Russia
- Coordinates: 50°42′N 37°22′E
- Country: Russia
- Region: Belgorod Oblast
- District: Korochansky District
- Time zone: UTC+3:00

Zhigaylovka (Russian: Жигайловка) is a rural locality (a selo) and the administrative center of Zhigaylovskoye Rural Settlement, Korochansky District, Belgorod Oblast, Russia. The population was 590 as of 2010. There are 7 streets.

== Geography ==
Zhigaylovka is located 19 km southeast of Korocha (the district's administrative centre) by road. Trud is the nearest rural locality.
