= Dmitriyevka =

Dmitriyevka (Russian: Дмитриевка) is the name of several inhabited localities in Russia.

== Altai Krai ==
As of 2010, one rural locality in Altai Krai bears this name:

- Dmitriyevka, Altai Krai, a selo in Lenkovsky Selsoviet of Blagoveshchensky District

== Altai Republic ==
As of 2010, one rural locality in the Altai Republic bears this name:

- Dmitriyevka, Altai Republic, a selo in Dmitriyevskoye Rural Settlement of Turochaksky District

== Amur Oblast ==
As of 2010, three rural localities in Amur Oblast bear this name:

- Dmitriyevka, Ivanovsky District, Amur Oblast, a selo in Dmitriyevsky Rural Settlement of Ivanovsky District
- Dmitriyevka, Mazanovsky District, Amur Oblast, a selo in Dmitriyevsky Rural Settlement of Mazanovsky District
- Dmitriyevka, Svobodnensky District, Amur Oblast, a selo in Dmitriyevsky Rural Settlement of Svobodnensky District

== Astrakhan Oblast ==
As of 2010, one rural locality in Astrakhan Oblast bears this name:

- Dmitriyevka, Astrakhan Oblast, a selo in Pokrovsky Selsoviet of Akhtubinsky District

== Republic of Bashkortostan ==
As of 2010, thirteen rural localities in the Republic of Bashkortostan bear this name:

- Dmitriyevka, Blagovarsky District, Republic of Bashkortostan, a village in Dmitriyevsky Selsoviet of Blagovarsky District
- Dmitriyevka, Nikolayevsky Selsoviet, Blagoveshchensky District, Republic of Bashkortostan, a village in Nikolayevsky Selsoviet of Blagoveshchensky District
- Dmitriyevka, Pokrovsky Selsoviet, Blagoveshchensky District, Republic of Bashkortostan, a village in Pokrovsky Selsoviet of Blagoveshchensky District
- Dmitriyevka, Dmitriyevsky Selsoviet, Chishminsky District, Republic of Bashkortostan, a village in Dmitriyevsky Selsoviet of Chishminsky District
- Dmitriyevka, Shingak-Kulsky Selsoviet, Chishminsky District, Republic of Bashkortostan, a village in Shingak-Kulsky Selsoviet of Chishminsky District
- Dmitriyevka, Beloozersky Selsoviet, Gafuriysky District, Republic of Bashkortostan, a village in Beloozersky Selsoviet of Gafuriysky District
- Dmitriyevka, Mrakovsky Selsoviet, Gafuriysky District, Republic of Bashkortostan, a village in Mrakovsky Selsoviet of Gafuriysky District
- Dmitriyevka, Karmaskalinsky District, Republic of Bashkortostan, a village in Yefremkinsky Selsoviet of Karmaskalinsky District
- Dmitriyevka, Nordovsky Selsoviet, Meleuzovsky District, Republic of Bashkortostan, a village in Nordovsky Selsoviet of Meleuzovsky District
- Dmitriyevka, Pervomaysky Selsoviet, Meleuzovsky District, Republic of Bashkortostan, a village in Pervomaysky Selsoviet of Meleuzovsky District
- Dmitriyevka, Sterlibashevsky District, Republic of Bashkortostan, a village in Starokalkashevsky Selsoviet of Sterlibashevsky District
- Dmitriyevka, Ufimsky District, Republic of Bashkortostan, a selo in Dmitriyevsky Selsoviet of Ufimsky District
- Dmitriyevka, Zilairsky District, Republic of Bashkortostan, a village in Dmitriyevsky Selsoviet of Zilairsky District

== Belgorod Oblast ==
As of 2010, four rural localities in Belgorod Oblast bear this name:

- Dmitriyevka, Rakityansky District, Belgorod Oblast, a selo in Dmitriyevsky Rural Okrug of Rakityansky District
- Dmitriyevka, Shebekinsky District, Belgorod Oblast, a selo in Shebekinsky District
- Dmitriyevka, Starooskolsky District, Belgorod Oblast, a selo in Starooskolsky District
- Dmitriyevka, Yakovlevsky District, Belgorod Oblast, a selo in Yakovlevsky District

== Bryansk Oblast ==
As of 2010, one rural locality in Bryansk Oblast bears this name:

- Dmitriyevka, Bryansk Oblast, a village in Staropolonsky Selsoviet of Gordeyevsky District

== Chuvash Republic ==
As of 2010, one rural locality in the Chuvash Republic bears this name:

- Dmitriyevka, Chuvash Republic, a village in Shibylginskoye Rural Settlement of Kanashsky District

== Irkutsk Oblast ==
As of 2010, one rural locality in Irkutsk Oblast bears this name:

- Dmitriyevka, Irkutsk Oblast, a village in Zalarinsky District

== Kaluga Oblast ==
As of 2010, one rural locality in Kaluga Oblast bears this name:

- Dmitriyevka, Kaluga Oblast, a village in Babyninsky District

== Kemerovo Oblast ==
As of 2010, three rural localities in Kemerovo Oblast bear this name:

- Dmitriyevka, Chebulinsky District, Kemerovo Oblast, a village in Alchedatskaya Rural Territory of Chebulinsky District
- Dmitriyevka, Guryevsky District, Kemerovo Oblast, a selo in Urskaya Rural Territory of Guryevsky District
- Dmitriyevka, Kemerovsky District, Kemerovo Oblast, a village in Arsentyevskaya Rural Territory of Kemerovsky District

== Republic of Khakassia ==
As of 2010, one rural locality in the Republic of Khakassia bears this name:

- Dmitriyevka, Republic of Khakassia, a village in Novoyeniseysky Selsoviet of Beysky District

== Kirov Oblast ==
As of 2010, one rural locality in Kirov Oblast bears this name:

- Dmitriyevka, Kirov Oblast, a village in Meletsky Rural Okrug of Malmyzhsky District

== Kostroma Oblast ==
As of 2010, two rural localities in Kostroma Oblast bear this name:

- Dmitriyevka, Buysky District, Kostroma Oblast, a settlement in Baranovskoye Settlement of Buysky District
- Dmitriyevka, Nerekhtsky District, Kostroma Oblast, a village in Volzhskoye Settlement of Nerekhtsky District

== Krasnoyarsk Krai ==
As of 2010, two rural localities in Krasnoyarsk Krai bear this name:

- Dmitriyevka, Bolshekosulsky Selsoviet, Bogotolsky District, Krasnoyarsk Krai, a village in Bolshekosulsky Selsoviet of Bogotolsky District
- Dmitriyevka, Vaginsky Selsoviet, Bogotolsky District, Krasnoyarsk Krai, a village in Vaginsky Selsoviet of Bogotolsky District

== Kurgan Oblast ==
As of 2010, two rural localities in Kurgan Oblast bear this name:

- Dmitriyevka, Mokrousovsky District, Kurgan Oblast, a village in Staropershinsky Selsoviet of Mokrousovsky District
- Dmitriyevka, Polovinsky District, Kurgan Oblast, a village in Buldaksky Selsoviet of Polovinsky District

== Kursk Oblast ==
As of 2010, five rural localities in Kursk Oblast bear this name:

- Dmitriyevka, Fatezhsky District, Kursk Oblast, a village in Verkhnekhotemlsky Selsoviet of Fatezhsky District
- Dmitriyevka, Kastorensky District, Kursk Oblast, a khutor in Azarovsky Selsoviet of Kastorensky District
- Dmitriyevka, Oktyabrsky District, Kursk Oblast, a village in Starkovsky Selsoviet of Oktyabrsky District
- Dmitriyevka, Timsky District, Kursk Oblast, a village in Barkovsky Selsoviet of Timsky District
- Dmitriyevka, Zolotukhinsky District, Kursk Oblast, a selo in Dmitriyevsky Selsoviet of Zolotukhinsky District

== Lipetsk Oblast ==
As of 2010, five rural localities in Lipetsk Oblast bear this name:

- Dmitriyevka, Krasninsky District, Lipetsk Oblast, a village in Alexandrovsky Selsoviet of Krasninsky District
- Dmitriyevka, Stanovlyansky District, Lipetsk Oblast, a selo in Petrishchevsky Selsoviet of Stanovlyansky District
- Dmitriyevka, Usmansky District, Lipetsk Oblast, a selo in Dmitriyevsky Selsoviet of Usmansky District
- Dmitriyevka, Yeletsky District, Lipetsk Oblast, a village in Nizhnevorgolsky Selsoviet of Yeletsky District
- Dmitriyevka, Zadonsky District, Lipetsk Oblast, a village in Verkhnestudenetsky Selsoviet of Zadonsky District

== Republic of Mordovia ==
As of 2010, two rural localities in the Republic of Mordovia bear this name:

- Dmitriyevka, Romodanovsky District, Republic of Mordovia, a settlement in Pyatinsky Selsoviet of Romodanovsky District
- Dmitriyevka, Zubovo-Polyansky District, Republic of Mordovia, a settlement in Ugolkovsky Selsoviet of Zubovo-Polyansky District

== Moscow Oblast ==
As of 2010, one rural locality in Moscow Oblast bears this name:

- Dmitriyevka, Moscow Oblast, a village in Uspenskoye Rural Settlement of Serebryano-Prudsky District

== Nizhny Novgorod Oblast ==
As of 2010, two rural localities in Nizhny Novgorod Oblast bear this name:

- Dmitriyevka, Bolsheboldinsky District, Nizhny Novgorod Oblast, a village in Bolsheboldinsky Selsoviet of Bolsheboldinsky District
- Dmitriyevka, Knyagininsky District, Nizhny Novgorod Oblast, a village in Solovyevsky Selsoviet of Knyagininsky District

== Novosibirsk Oblast ==
As of 2010, two rural localities in Novosibirsk Oblast bear this name:

- Dmitriyevka, Tatarsky District, Novosibirsk Oblast, a selo in Tatarsky District
- Dmitriyevka, Ust-Tarksky District, Novosibirsk Oblast, a village in Ust-Tarksky District

== Orenburg Oblast ==
As of 2010, five rural localities in Orenburg Oblast bear this name:

- Dmitriyevka, Alexandrovsky District, Orenburg Oblast, a selo in Marksovsky Selsoviet of Alexandrovsky District
- Dmitriyevka, Buguruslansky District, Orenburg Oblast, a selo in Dmitriyevsky Selsoviet of Buguruslansky District
- Dmitriyevka, Buzuluksky District, Orenburg Oblast, a selo in Novoalexandrovsky Selsoviet of Buzuluksky District
- Dmitriyevka, Ponomaryovsky District, Orenburg Oblast, a village in Ponomarevsky Selsoviet of Ponomaryovsky District
- Dmitriyevka, Sakmarsky District, Orenburg Oblast, a selo in Verkhnechebenkovsky Selsoviet of Sakmarsky District

== Oryol Oblast ==
As of 2010, four rural localities in Oryol Oblast bear this name:

- Dmitriyevka, Mtsensky District, Oryol Oblast, a village in Chakhinsky Selsoviet of Mtsensky District
- Dmitriyevka, Galichinsky Selsoviet, Verkhovsky District, Oryol Oblast, a village in Galichinsky Selsoviet of Verkhovsky District
- Dmitriyevka, Vasilyevsky Selsoviet, Verkhovsky District, Oryol Oblast, a village in Vasilyevsky Selsoviet of Verkhovsky District
- Dmitriyevka, Zalegoshchensky District, Oryol Oblast, a village in Zolotarevsky Selsoviet of Zalegoshchensky District

== Penza Oblast ==
As of 2010, five rural localities in Penza Oblast bear this name:

- Dmitriyevka, Issinsky District, Penza Oblast, a selo in Solovtsovsky Selsoviet of Issinsky District
- Dmitriyevka, Kameshkirsky District, Penza Oblast, a village in Lapshovsky Selsoviet of Kameshkirsky District
- Dmitriyevka, Mokshansky District, Penza Oblast, a selo in Podgornensky Selsoviet of Mokshansky District
- Dmitriyevka, Neverkinsky District, Penza Oblast, a selo in Neverkinsky Selsoviet of Neverkinsky District
- Dmitriyevka, Pachelmsky District, Penza Oblast, a settlement in Chkalovsky Selsoviet of Pachelmsky District

== Primorsky Krai ==
As of 2010, one rural locality in Primorsky Krai bears this name:

- Dmitriyevka, Primorsky Krai, a selo in Chernigovsky District

== Ryazan Oblast ==
As of 2010, eleven rural localities in Ryazan Oblast bear this name:

- Dmitriyevka, Mikhaylovsky District, Ryazan Oblast, a village in Gornostayevsky Rural Okrug of Mikhaylovsky District
- Dmitriyevka, Alexandro-Nevsky District, Ryazan Oblast, a village in Pavlovsky Rural Okrug of Alexandro-Nevsky District
- Dmitriyevka, Ryazansky District, Ryazan Oblast, a village in Lgovsky Rural Okrug of Ryazansky District
- Dmitriyevka, Ryazhsky District, Ryazan Oblast, a village in Petrovsky Rural Okrug of Ryazhsky District
- Dmitriyevka, Dmitriyevsky Rural Okrug, Sapozhkovsky District, Ryazan Oblast, a village in Dmitriyevsky Rural Okrug of Sapozhkovsky District
- Dmitriyevka, Morozovo-Borkovsky Rural Okrug, Sapozhkovsky District, Ryazan Oblast, a village in Morozovo-Borkovsky Rural Okrug of Sapozhkovsky District
- Dmitriyevka, Novokrasnensky Rural Okrug, Sapozhkovsky District, Ryazan Oblast, a village in Novokrasnensky Rural Okrug of Sapozhkovsky District
- Dmitriyevka, Boretsky Rural Okrug, Sarayevsky District, Ryazan Oblast, a village in Boretsky Rural Okrug of Sarayevsky District
- Dmitriyevka, Ozerkovsky Rural Okrug, Sarayevsky District, Ryazan Oblast, a village in Ozerkovsky Rural Okrug of Sarayevsky District
- Dmitriyevka, Troitsky Rural Okrug, Sarayevsky District, Ryazan Oblast, a village in Troitsky Rural Okrug of Sarayevsky District
- Dmitriyevka, Spassky District, Ryazan Oblast, a village in Ivankovsky Rural Okrug of Spassky District

== Samara Oblast ==
As of 2010, four rural localities in Samara Oblast bear this name:

- Dmitriyevka, Bezenchuksky District, Samara Oblast, a village in Bezenchuksky District
- Dmitriyevka, Neftegorsky District, Samara Oblast, a selo in Neftegorsky District
- Dmitriyevka, Pestravsky District, Samara Oblast, a selo in Pestravsky District
- Dmitriyevka, Pokhvistnevsky District, Samara Oblast, a settlement in Pokhvistnevsky District

== Saratov Oblast ==
As of 2010, seven rural localities in Saratov Oblast bear this name:

- Dmitriyevka, Dukhovnitsky District, Saratov Oblast, a selo in Dukhovnitsky District
- Dmitriyevka, Novouzensky District, Saratov Oblast, a selo in Novouzensky District
- Dmitriyevka, Petrovsky District, Saratov Oblast, a village in Petrovsky District
- Dmitriyevka (selo), Turkovsky District, Saratov Oblast, a selo in Turkovsky District
- Dmitriyevka (village), Turkovsky District, Saratov Oblast, a village in Turkovsky District
- Dmitriyevka, Volsky District, Saratov Oblast, a selo in Volsky District
- Dmitriyevka, Yershovsky District, Saratov Oblast, a selo in Yershovsky District

== Smolensk Oblast ==
As of 2010, one rural locality in Smolensk Oblast bears this name:

- Dmitriyevka, Smolensk Oblast, a village in Shatalovskoye Rural Settlement of Pochinkovsky District

== Tambov Oblast ==
As of 2010, ten inhabited localities in Tambov Oblast bear this name:

Urban localities

- Dmitriyevka, Dmitriyevsky Settlement Council, Nikiforovsky District, Tambov Oblast, a work settlement under the administrative jurisdiction of Dmitriyevsky Settlement Council of Nikiforovsky District

Rural localities

- Dmitriyevka, Gavrilovsky District, Tambov Oblast, a selo in Dmitriyevsky Selsoviet of Gavrilovsky District
- Dmitriyevka, Inzhavinsky District, Tambov Oblast, a village in Maryevsky Selsoviet of Inzhavinsky District
- Dmitriyevka, Mordovsky District, Tambov Oblast, a village in Lavrovsky Selsoviet of Mordovsky District
- Dmitriyevka, Morshansky District, Tambov Oblast, a selo in Dmitriyevsky Selsoviet of Morshansky District
- Dmitriyevka, Golitsynsky Selsoviet, Nikiforovsky District, Tambov Oblast, a selo in Golitsynsky Selsoviet of Nikiforovsky District
- Dmitriyevka, Sampursky District, Tambov Oblast, a village in Satinsky Selsoviet of Sampursky District
- Dmitriyevka, Sosnovsky District, Tambov Oblast, a selo in Otyassky Selsoviet of Sosnovsky District
- Dmitriyevka, Tambovsky District, Tambov Oblast, a village in Ivankovsky Selsoviet of Tambovsky District
- Dmitriyevka, Uvarovsky District, Tambov Oblast, a village in Pavlodarsky Selsoviet of Uvarovsky District

== Republic of Tatarstan ==
As of 2010, three rural localities in the Republic of Tatarstan bear this name:

- Dmitriyevka, Nizhnekamsk, Republic of Tatarstan, a village under the administrative jurisdiction of the city of republic significance of Nizhnekamsk
- Dmitriyevka, Aznakayevsky District, Republic of Tatarstan, a village in Aznakayevsky District
- Dmitriyevka, Bavlinsky District, Republic of Tatarstan, a selo in Bavlinsky District

== Tula Oblast ==
As of 2010, seven rural localities in Tula Oblast bear this name:

- Dmitriyevka, Belyovsky District, Tula Oblast, a village in Bolotsky Rural Okrug of Belyovsky District
- Dmitriyevka, Kamensky District, Tula Oblast, a village in Arkhangelsky Rural Okrug of Kamensky District
- Dmitriyevka, Kireyevsky District, Tula Oblast, a village in Olensky Rural Okrug of Kireyevsky District
- Dmitriyevka, Kurkinsky District, Tula Oblast, a village in Sergiyevskaya Volost of Kurkinsky District
- Dmitriyevka, Suvorovsky District, Tula Oblast, a village in Zyabrevskaya Rural Territory of Suvorovsky District
- Dmitriyevka, Lobanovsky Rural Okrug, Yefremovsky District, Tula Oblast, a village in Lobanovsky Rural Okrug of Yefremovsky District
- Dmitriyevka, Tormasovsky Rural Okrug, Yefremovsky District, Tula Oblast, a village in Tormasovsky Rural Okrug of Yefremovsky District

== Tyumen Oblast ==
As of 2010, one rural locality in Tyumen Oblast bears this name:

- Dmitriyevka, Tyumen Oblast, a village in Sitnikovsky Rural Okrug of Omutinsky District

== Udmurt Republic ==
As of 2010, one rural locality in the Udmurt Republic bears this name:

- Dmitriyevka, Udmurt Republic, a village in Mukshinsky Selsoviet of Yakshur-Bodyinsky District

== Ulyanovsk Oblast ==
As of 2010, two rural localities in Ulyanovsk Oblast bear this name:

- Dmitriyevka, Inzensky District, Ulyanovsk Oblast, a village in Oskinsky Rural Okrug of Inzensky District
- Dmitriyevka, Radishchevsky District, Ulyanovsk Oblast, a selo in Dmitriyevsky Rural Okrug of Radishchevsky District

== Vladimir Oblast ==
As of 2010, one rural locality in Vladimir Oblast bears this name:

- Dmitriyevka, Vladimir Oblast, a village in Muromsky District

== Volgograd Oblast ==
As of 2010, two rural localities in Volgograd Oblast bear this name:

- Dmitriyevka, Gorodishchensky District, Volgograd Oblast, a khutor in Karpovsky Selsoviet of Gorodishchensky District
- Dmitriyevka, Olkhovsky District, Volgograd Oblast, a selo in Solodchinsky Selsoviet of Olkhovsky District

== Voronezh Oblast ==
As of 2010, eight rural localities in Voronezh Oblast bear this name:

- Dmitriyevka, Buturlinovsky District, Voronezh Oblast, a selo in Berezovskoye Rural Settlement of Buturlinovsky District
- Dmitriyevka, Ertilsky District, Voronezh Oblast, a settlement in Pervoertilskoye Rural Settlement of Ertilsky District
- Dmitriyevka, Gribanovsky District, Voronezh Oblast, a selo in Kalinovskoye Rural Settlement of Gribanovsky District
- Dmitriyevka, Khokholsky District, Voronezh Oblast, a selo in Gremyachenskoye Rural Settlement of Khokholsky District
- Dmitriyevka, Liskinsky District, Voronezh Oblast, a selo in Pochepskoye Rural Settlement of Liskinsky District
- Dmitriyevka, Paninsky District, Voronezh Oblast, a selo in Dmitriyevskoye Rural Settlement of Paninsky District
- Dmitriyevka, Semiluksky District, Voronezh Oblast, a village in Zemlyanskoye Rural Settlement of Semiluksky District
- Dmitriyevka, Ternovsky District, Voronezh Oblast, a village in Yesipovskoye Rural Settlement of Ternovsky District

== Yaroslavl Oblast ==
As of 2010, four rural localities in Yaroslavl Oblast bear this name:

- Dmitriyevka, Lyubimsky District, Yaroslavl Oblast, a village in Kirillovsky Rural Okrug of Lyubimsky District
- Dmitriyevka, Myshkinsky District, Yaroslavl Oblast, a village in Rozhdestvensky Rural Okrug of Myshkinsky District
- Dmitriyevka, Pervomaysky District, Yaroslavl Oblast, a village in Semenovsky Rural Okrug of Pervomaysky District
- Dmitriyevka, Rybinsky District, Yaroslavl Oblast, a village in Mikhaylovsky Rural Okrug of Rybinsky District

== See also ==
- Dmytrivka (disambiguation), the Ukrainian equivalent
