= Maritsa =

River in the Balkans

Maritsa Hebrus, Meriç
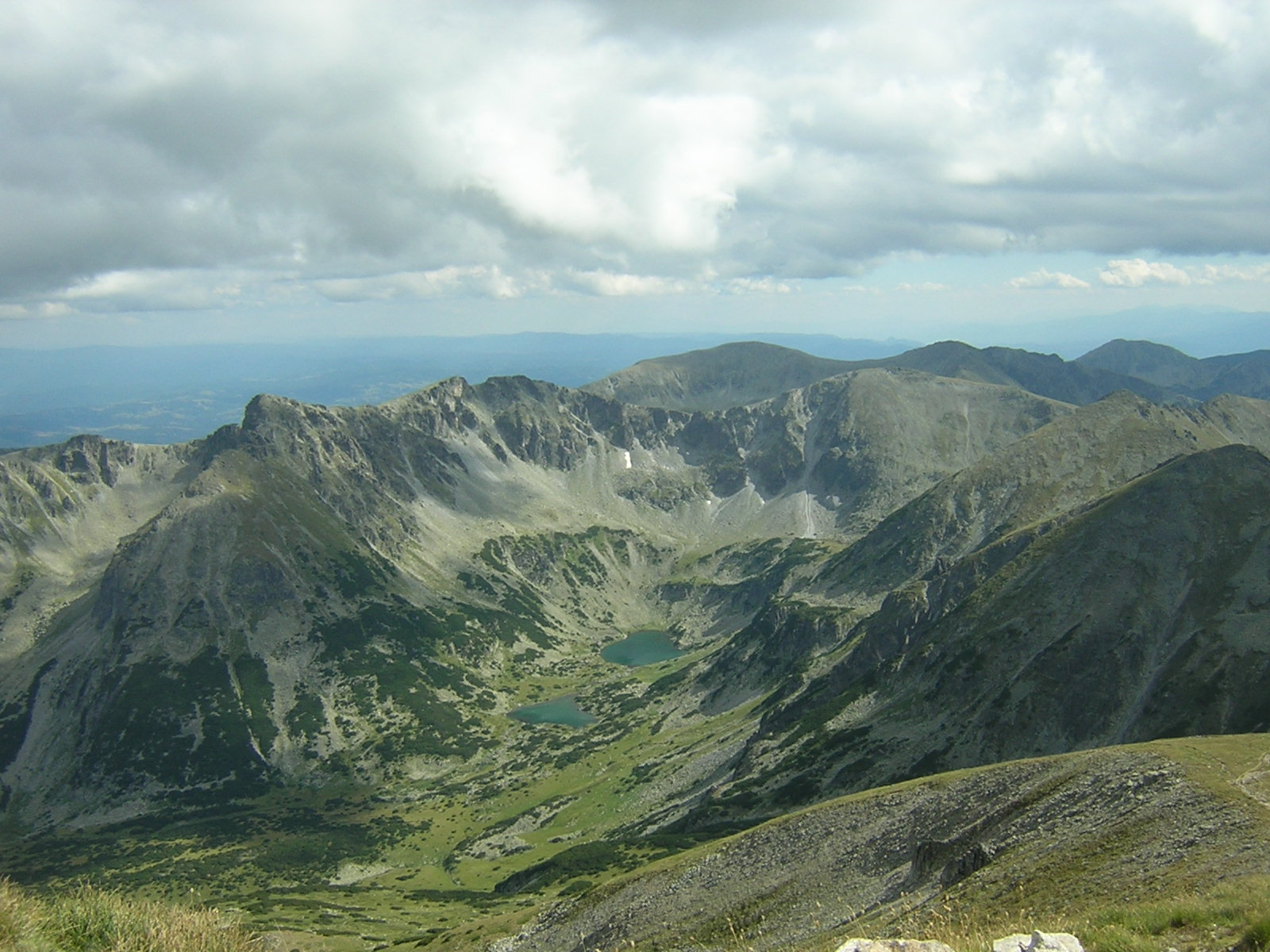
- The source valley of the Maritsa river in the Rila Mountains with Marichini Lakes
- Native name: Марица (Bulgarian); Έβρος (Greek); Meriç (Turkish)

Location
- Countries: Bulgaria; Greece; Turkey

Physical characteristics
- Source
  - location: Rila Mountains, Bulgaria
  - elevation: 2,378 m (7,802 ft)
- Mouth
  - location: Aegean Sea, 14.5 km (9.0 mi) east of Alexandroupoli
  - coordinates: 40°43′50″N 26°2′6″E
- Length: 480 km (300 mi)
- Basin size: 53,000 km^{2} (20,000 sq mi)
- Discharge
  - average: for mouth 234 m^{3}/s (8,300 cu ft/s)

Map of the river

The Maritsa, (Note: Bulgarian: Марица, romanized: Marica, pronounced [mɐˈɾit͡sɐ]; Romanian: Marița, pronounced [maˈrit͡sa]; Greek: Μαρίτσα, romanized: Marítsa, pronounced [maˈɾits̠a]) known in Greek as the Evros (Note: Ancient Greek: Ἕβρος, romanized: Hébros, pronounced [ˈhebros]; Modern Greek: Έβρος, romanized: Evros, pronounced [ˈevɾos̠]; Latin: Hebrus, pronounced [ˈhɛbrʊs]) and in Turkish as the Meriç, is a river that runs through the region of Thrace, in Southeast Europe. With a length of 480 km (300 mi), it is the longest river that runs solely in the interior of the Balkan peninsula, and one of the largest in Europe by discharge. It flows through Bulgaria in its upper and middle reaches, while its lower course forms part of the border between Greece and Turkey. Its drainage area is about 53,000 km^{2} (20,000 sq mi), of which 66.2% is in Bulgaria, 27.5% in Turkey, and 6.3% in Greece. It is the main river of the historical region of Thrace, most of which lies in its drainage basin.

It has its origin in the Rila Mountains in Western Bulgaria, its source being the Marichini Lakes. The Maritsa flows east-southeast between the Balkan and Rhodope Mountains, past Plovdiv and Dimitrovgrad in Bulgaria to Edirne in Turkey. East of Svilengrad, Bulgaria, the river flows eastwards, forming the border between Bulgaria (on the north bank) and Greece (on the south bank), and then between Turkey and Greece. At Edirne, the river meets its two chief tributaries Tundzha and Arda, and flows through Turkish territory on both banks. It then turns towards the south and forms the border between Greece on the west bank and Turkey on the east bank all the way to the Aegean Sea, which it enters near Enez, forming a river delta. The upper Maritsa valley is a principal east–west route in Bulgaria. The unnavigable river is used for hydroelectric power generation and for irrigation.

== Names ==
The earliest known name of the river is Εύρος (Euros, Alcman, 7th–6th century BC). Proto-Indo-European *h₁wérus and Ancient Greek εὐρύς meant 'wide'. The Proto-Indo-European consonant cluster *-wr- shifted in Thracian to -br-, creating the Thracian name Ebros. Thereafter, the river began to be known as Ἕβρος (Hébros) in Greek and Hebrus in Latin. Rather than an origin as 'wide river', an alternative hypothesis is that is borrowed from Thracian ebros meaning 'splasher'.

While the name Ἕβρος (Hébros) was used in Ancient Greek, the name Μαρίτσα (Marítsa) had become standard before the ancient form Ἕβρος was restituted in Modern Greek as Έβρος (now: [ˈevɾos̠]). The name Maritsa may derive from a mountain near the mouth of the river known in antiquity as Μηρισός or Μήριζος, Latinized as Merit(h)us.

== History ==
In 1371, the river was the site of the Battle of Maritsa, also known as the battle of Chernomen, an Ottoman victory over the Serbian rulers Vukašin Mrnjavčević and Jovan Uglješa, who died in the battle.

After 1923, the river gained political significance as the modern border between Greece and Turkey. This was further bolstered by Greece joining the European Union in 1981 (and then the Schengen area), marking the river as an external boundary of the EU.

Since the 1990s, the river, as a natural barrier on the border between Turkey and Greece, has become a major route for migrants from a variety of countries attempting to enter the EU irregularly. Between 2000 and 2019, 398 bodies were found on the Greek side of the Maritsa/Evros river. Up until that time, drowning in the river was the leading cause of death among migrants trying to enter Greece.

In February 2020, Turkey unilaterally opened its borders to Greece to allow refugees and migrants seeking refuge to reach the European Union, leading to the 2020 Greek–Turkish border crisis. In May 2020, news emerged that Turkish forces occupied 16 acres (6.5 ha) of Greek territory, Melissokomeio, as shown on maps of 1923, following a change in the flow of the river. These crises passed following the improvement in Greek-Turkish relations in 2023, however, illegal migration is still a major issue.

== Tributaries ==
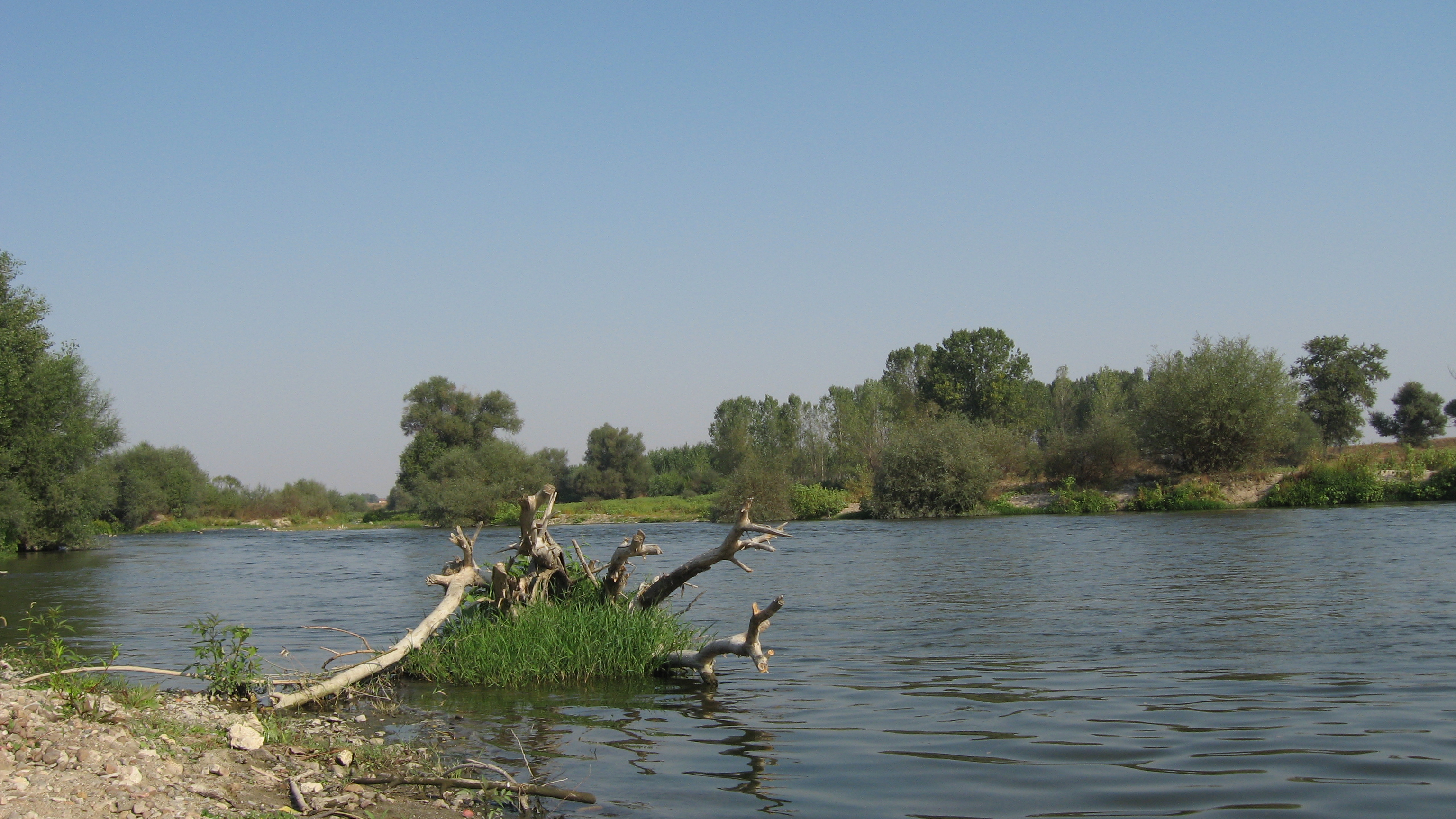
The middle course of the Maritsa River at Nova Nadezhda, Bulgaria

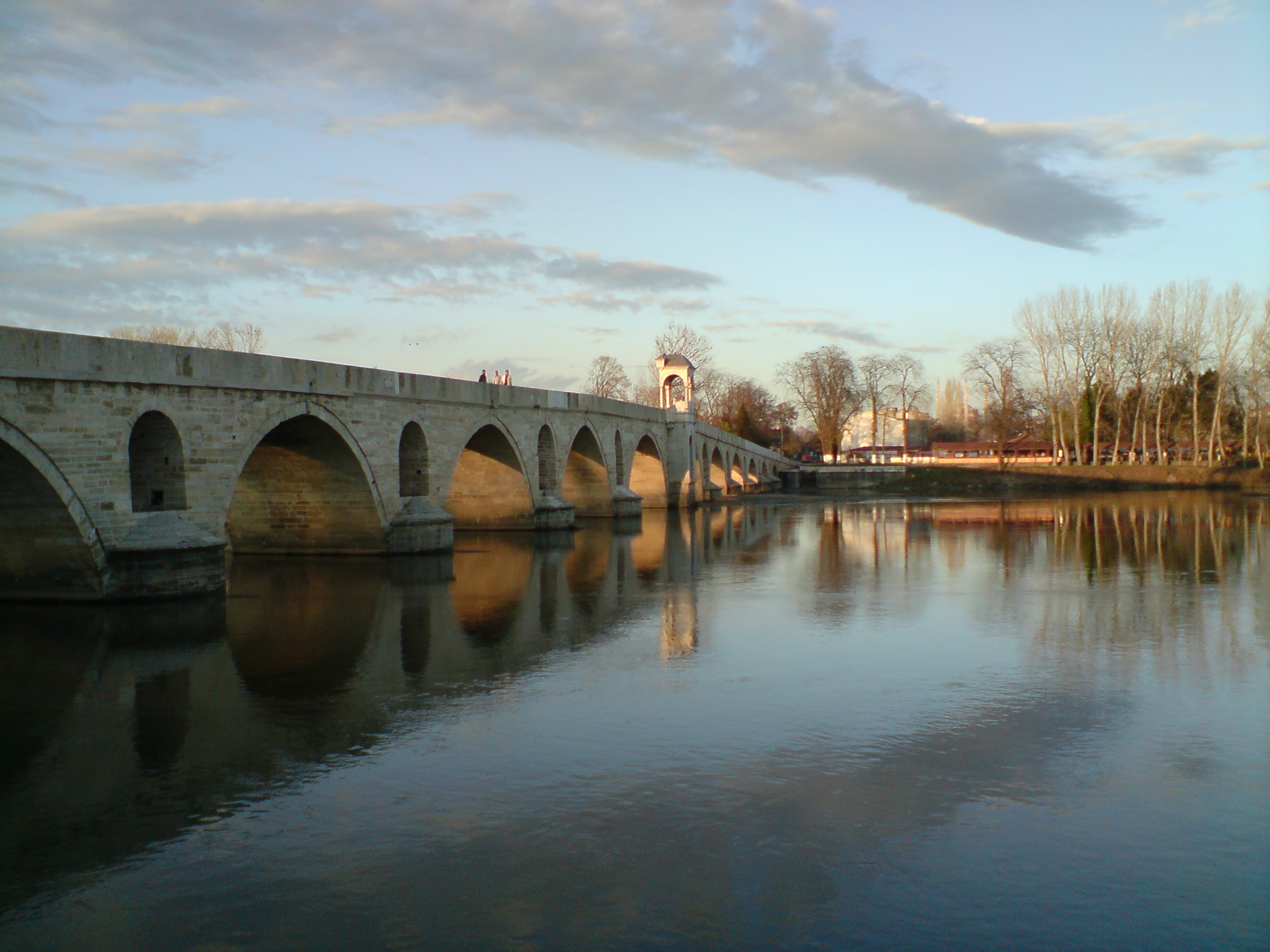
The Meriç River at Edirne

Starting from the river's source, significant tributaries of Maritsa include:

- Left tributaries:
  - Topolnitsa (flows into Maritsa near Pazardzhik)
  - Luda Yana (near Ognyanovo)
  - Stryama (near Sadovo)
  - Sazliyka (near Simeonovgrad)
  - Tundzha/Tunca (in Edirne)
  - Ergene (near İpsala)
- Right tributaries:
  - Chepinska reka (near Septemvri)
  - Vacha (near Stamboliyski)
  - Chepelarska reka (near Sadovo)
  - Harmanliyska reka (near Harmanli)
  - Arda/Ardas (near Edirne)
  - Erythropotamos/Luda reka (near Didymoteicho)

== Floods ==
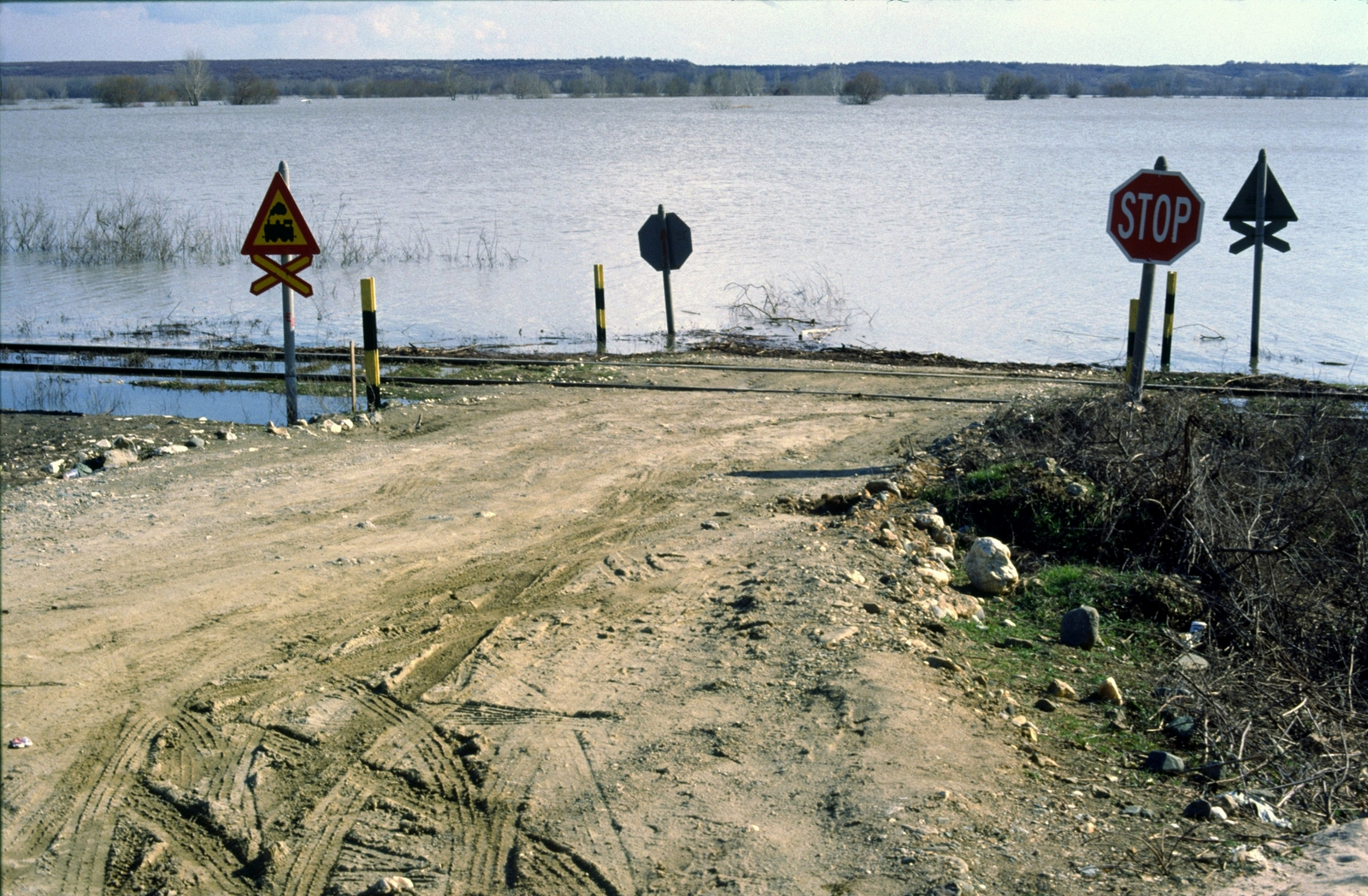
March-2005 Maritsa river floods, Greek side, close to Lavara village.

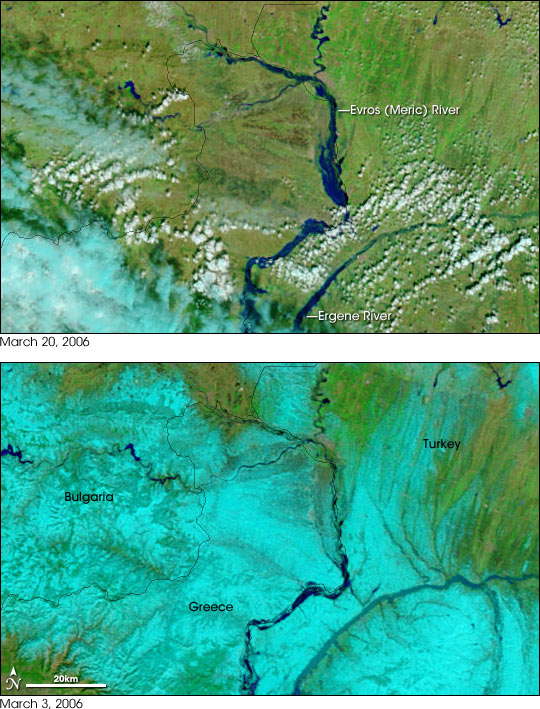
Satellite image of floods along the river in 2006.

The lower course of the river Maritsa, where it forms the border between Greece and Turkey, is very vulnerable to flooding. For about 4 months every year, the low lands around the river are flooded. This causes significant economic damage (loss of agricultural production and damage to infrastructure), which is estimated at several hundreds million Euro.

Recent large floods have taken place in 2006, 2007, 2014, with the largest flood taking place in 2021. Several causes have been proposed, including more rainfall due to climate change, deforestation in the Bulgarian part of the catchment area, increased land use in the flood plains and difficult communication between the three countries.

== Trivia ==
Maritsa Peak on Livingston Island in the South Shetland Islands, Antarctica is named after Maritsa River.

La Maritza is also a 1968 song written by Jean Renard and Pierre Delanoë and interpreted by Sylvie Vartan.

Hebrus Valles on Mars is named after this river.

The Bulgarian Maritsa motorway, which roughly follows the course of the river from Chirpan (where it branches out of the Trakia motorway) to the Turkish border at Kapitan Andreevo, is also named in honour of the river.

Shumi Maritsa, the national anthem of Bulgaria from 1886 to 1947, has its title refer to the river. The lyrics describe the river being bloody after fighting.

== Gallery ==
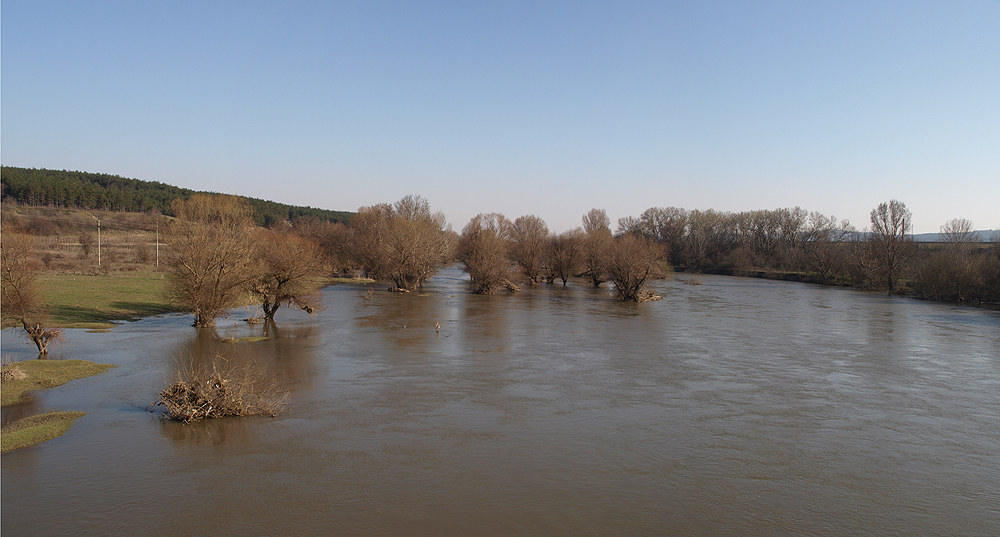
Spring freshet of Maritsa River at Harmanli

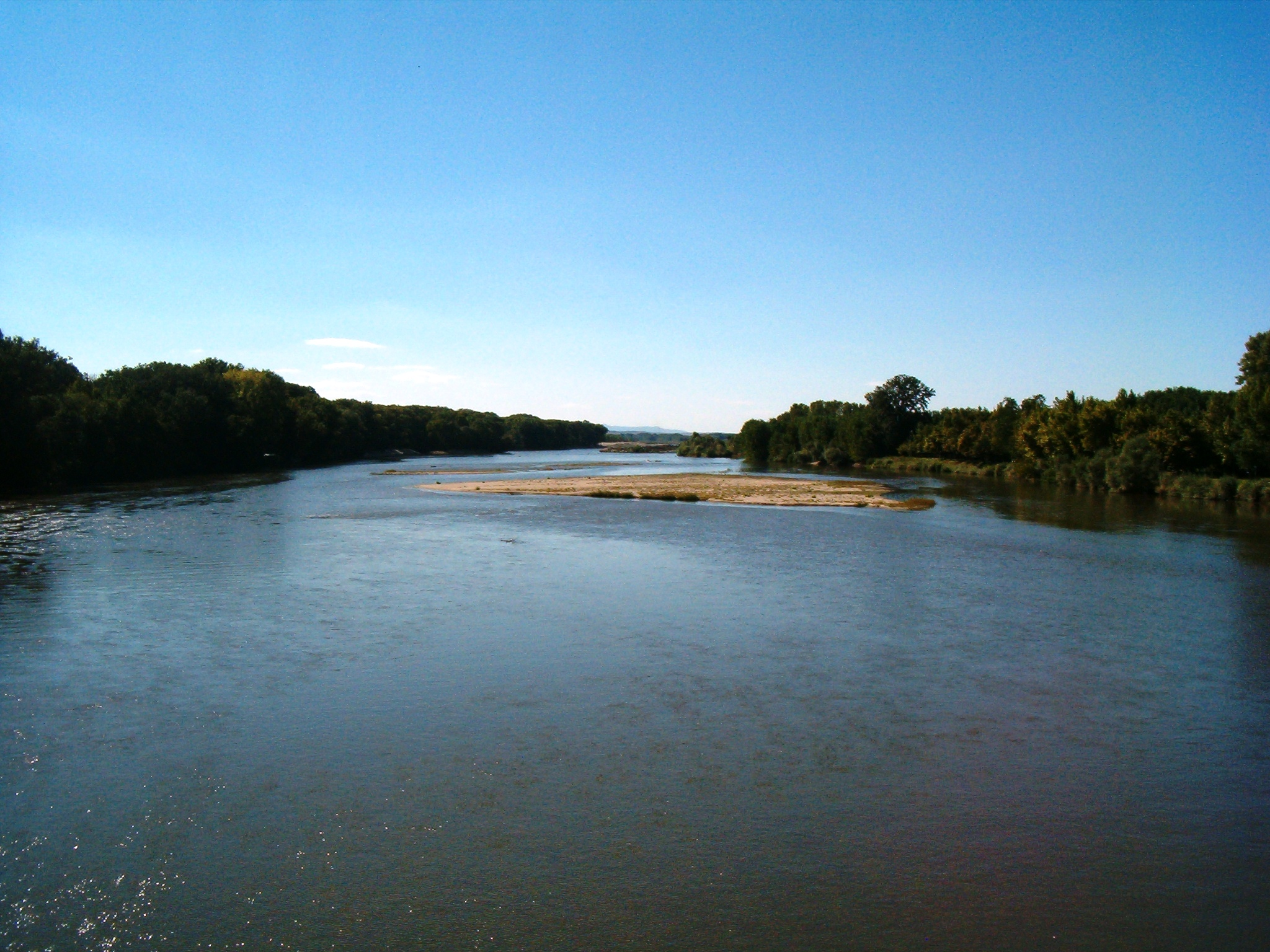
View from the river, Edirne.

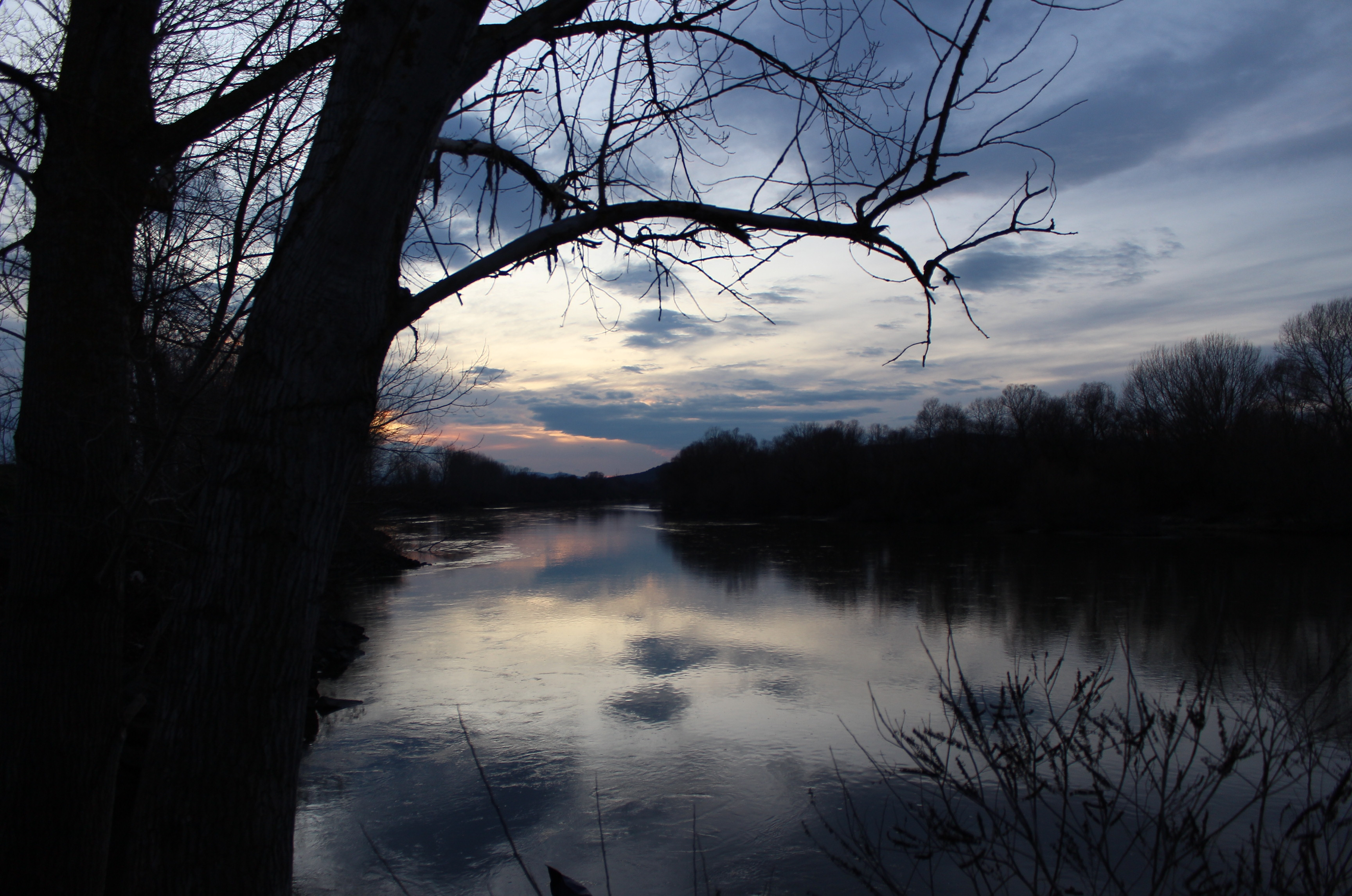
The river viewed from Turkey. Greek land visible on the right.

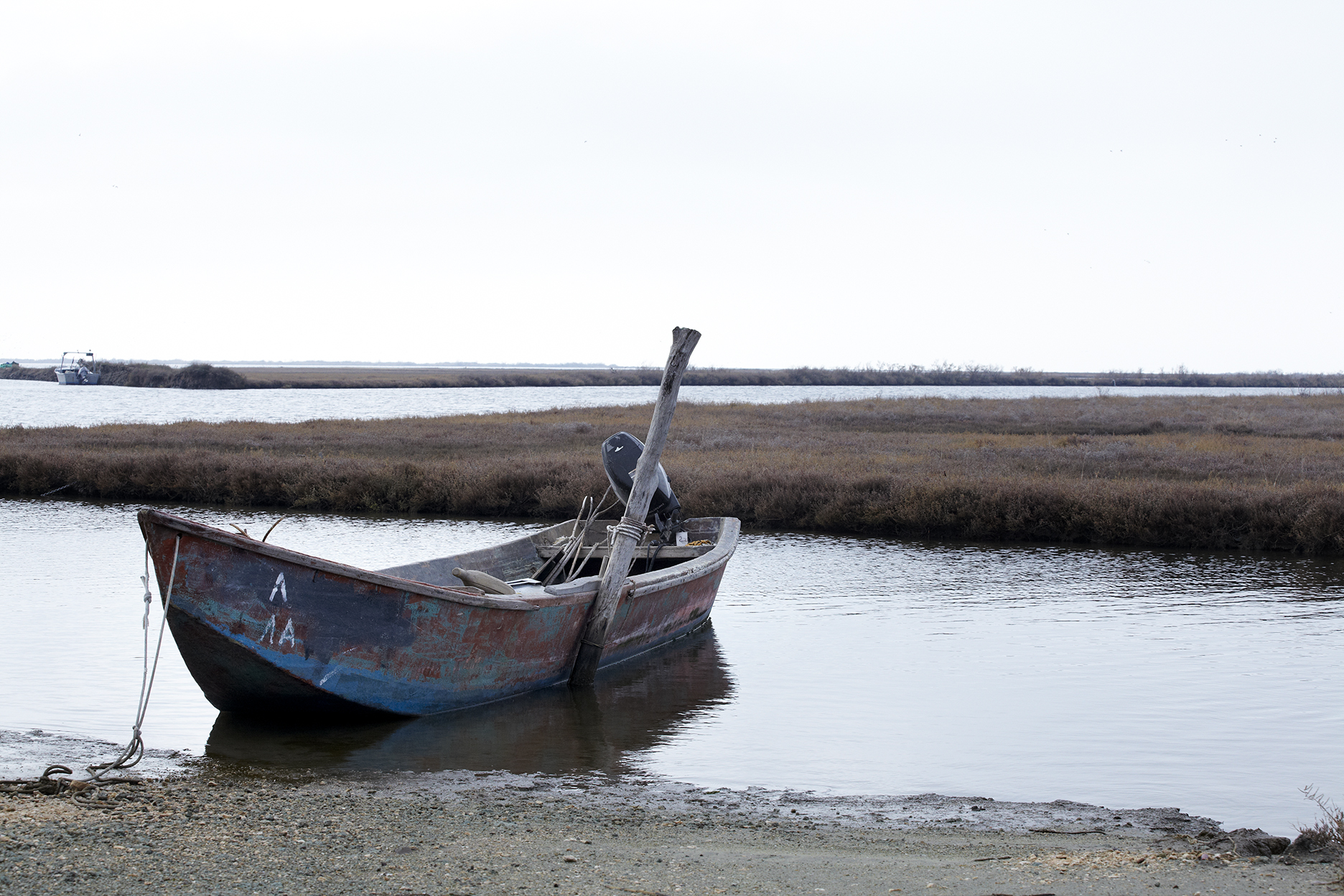
Boat on the delta.
