= Timeline of the war in Donbas (2014) =

- 2014; 2015; 2016; 2017; 2018; 2019; 2020; 2021; 2022

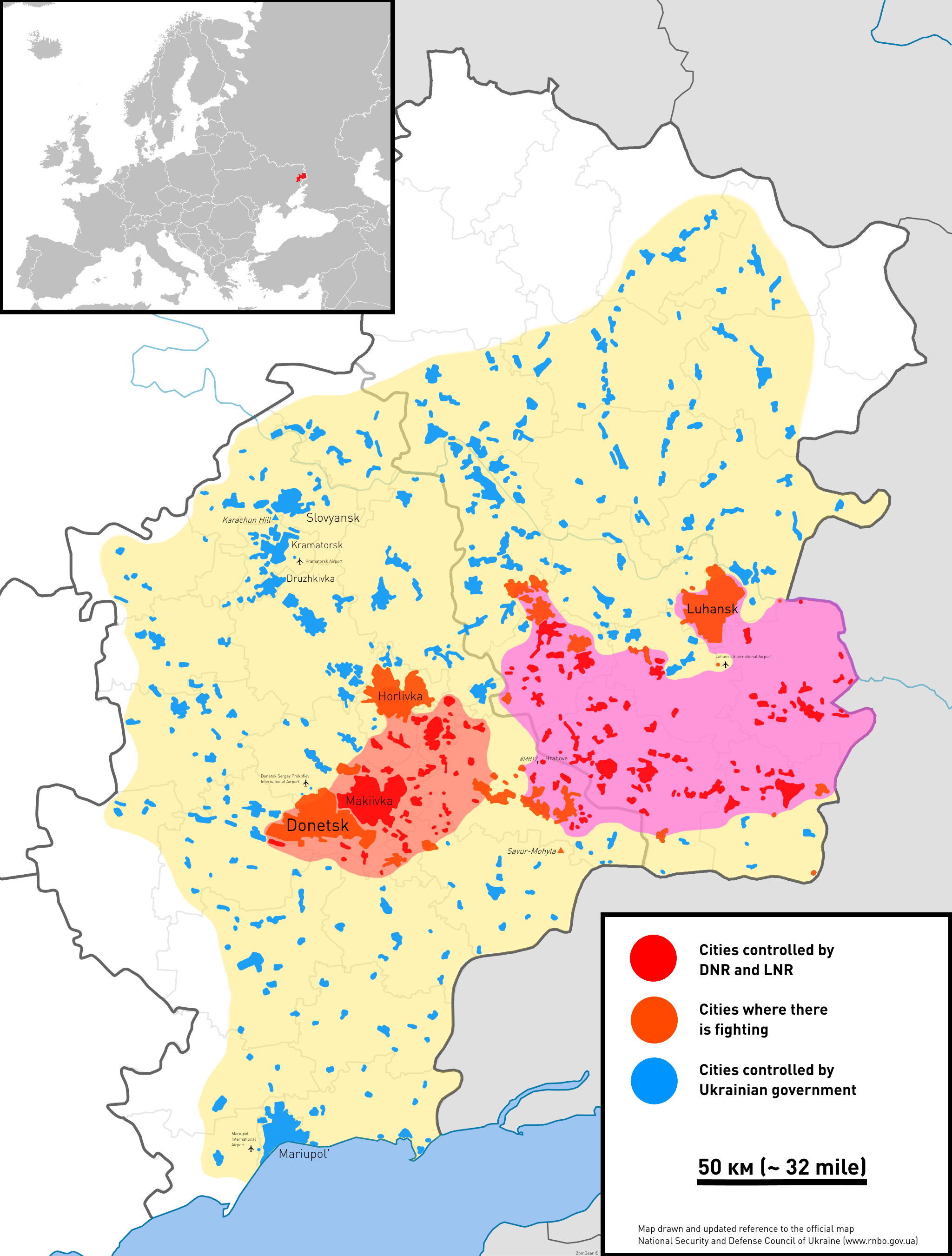
Map of Donbas for early August 2014

This is a timeline of the war in Donbas for the year 2014.

== April –June ==
- 7 April – At 3:30 am, pro-Russian activists stormed the SBU offices in Donetsk and Luhansk. They did not initially make clear demands, but later called for a referendum on independence from Ukraine by 11 May. The militants took control of the SBU armoury and armed themselves with automatic weapons, while other supporters brought bricks and debris to erect barricades. They initially numbered 1,000, but subsequently thinned. In an address on the Ukrainian national television channel, interim President Oleksandr Turchynov stated that the current unrest in eastern Ukraine was "the second wave" of a Russian operation to destabilise Ukraine, overthrow the government and disrupt planned elections and represented an attempt by Russia to "dismember" Ukraine. He vowed to launch a major "counter-terrorism" operation against separatist movements.
- 8 April – In Luhansk, separatists occupying the SBU building declared themselves the "Luhansk Parliamentary Republic". According to Ukrainian security officials, the separatists planted mines in the building and took 60 people hostage.
- 11 April – In Mariupol, a pro-Ukraine flashmob of 100 took place outside the police department. Protesters were attacked by men with bats as the police did not react.
- 12 April – Fifty-two armed militants led by Igor Girkin (retired FSB colonel) attacked the executive committee building, the police department, and the Security Service of Ukraine offices in Sloviansk. His militia was formed in Crimea and consisted of volunteers from Russia, Crimea, and other regions of Ukraine (Vinnytsia, Zhytomyr, Kyiv) and many people from Donetsk and the Luhansk region. Two thirds were Ukrainian citizens. The majority of men had combat experience. Many of the Ukrainians had fought in the Russian Armed Forces in Chechnya and Central Asia. Others fought in Iraq and the former Yugoslavia with the Ukrainian Armed Forces. Girkin's original intention was to replicate the Crimean scenario (seizure of the territory by Russian army). According to Girkin, nobody fought for the Donetsk People's Republic or the Luhansk People's Republic, everybody initially wanted to join Russia. Girkin flew a Russian flag at his headquarters and his men were perceived as Russian forces by the local population. Girkin believed that the Russian Armed Forces and the Russian state would quickly follow and the Donbas would become a republic within Russia. In Kramatorsk, in the course of a pro-Russian rally, protestors overpowered a police line and occupied the building of the local executive committee, where they hoisted the new-proclaimed republic's flag. At evening, the police station was captured by armed men in camouflage fatigues after a protracted firefight.
- 15 April – In accordance with the Ukrainian law on fighting the terrorism Turchynov announced the start of an "anti-terrorist operation" (Ukrainian: Антитерористична операція, abbreviation – ATO). An armoured column sent by Ukraine established a checkpoint 40 km from Sloviansk. The SBU claimed that rebels there had been reinforced by several hundred soldiers from Russia's Main Intelligence Directorate. Ukrainian special forces retook Kramatorsk airfield. According to Ukrainian officials no fatalities occurred on either side, while rebel reports varied from two militiamen wounded to eleven dead.
- 16 April – Six BMD-2 armoured vehicles were captured by pro-Russian militias when they were stopped at a rebel checkpoint near Kramatorsk. They were later seen driven by masked pro-Russian troops to Sloviansk. The Ukrainian Ministry of Defence (MOD) confirmed the loss. In Mariupol, 300 insurgents attempted to occupy a military base and demanded soldiers turn over their weapons. They threw petrol bombs at base guards. After firing warning shots, police together with the National Guard and Omega units returned fire. According to Interior Minister Arsen Avakov, three insurgents were killed and 13 wounded, while 63 were arrested; no Ukrainian officers were killed in the battle.
- 20 April – On Turchinov's orders, Dmytro Yarosh led 20 Right Sector members to sabotage an insurgent-controlled television tower in Sloviansk, leading to the first combat fatalities in the Siege of Sloviansk. Yarosh denied his role in these events for two years.
- 21 April – In Luhansk, separatists announced two referendums, one on 11 May to decide between autonomy or retaining the current status and a second on 18 May to decide to join Russia or declare independence.
- 25 April – Two Ukrainian aircraft –an Mi-8 helicopter and an An-2 plane- were destroyed in an apparent RPG attack claimed by pro-Russian militias at the Kramatorsk airport, where the control tower was damaged. The explosion injured one Ukrainian officer.
- 27 April – Separatists in Luhansk proclaimed the "Luhansk People's Republic".
- 2 May – At dawn, Ukrainian forces launched a large-scale operation to retake Sloviansk. Reports mentioned gunfire, explosions, and a military helicopter opening fire. Separatists said one Mi-24 helicopter had been shot down and one of the pilots captured. Separatist authorities said that three militants and two civilians were killed. The Ukrainian Ministry of Internal Affairs reported that up to nine checkpoints around Sloviansk were seized. They acknowledged that two helicopters were shot down and two airmen were killed. Seven were wounded. The fighting died down by afternoon. Confrontation between supporters and opponents of the post-Maidan Ukrainian government in Odesa resulted in 48 dead and 247 wounded
- 5 May – Fighting continued in Sloviansk, where a Ukrainian Mi-24 helicopter was shot down and crashed into a river; its crew survived. The Ukrainian government accused the separatists of using heavy weapons, including mortars.
- 7 May – After a day of clashes that involved an ambush against Ukrainian forces and the death of two militants, pro-Russian demonstrators re-occupied Mariupol city hall after Ukrainian security forces withdrew. They were later attacked by special troops using tear gas, which according to pro-Russian sources affected 15 people. A pro-Russian spokeswoman said that five militants were killed and 15 captured during the Ukrainian operation.
- 9 May – Clashes followed in Mariupol, where 60 separatists attempted to occupy the police station. The attack was repulsed, leaving the building in flames. The Ukrainian Internal Affairs Ministry claimed that 20 rebels were killed and four captured. The Ukrainians acknowledged one killed and five wounded. It was later reported that the police superintendent had been abducted by the militiamen.
- 10 May – The MOD announced the deaths of a Lieutenant Colonel and an artillery soldier during the Mariupol battle. The Colonel's vehicle was ambushed en route to the police station, while the soldier was killed in the building assault.
- 11 May – Two independence referendums were held in Donetsk and Luhansk. In Donetsk, the organizers stated that 89% voted in favour of self-rule, with 10% against, while turnout was nearly 75%. In Luhansk, the organizers stated that 96.2% voted for separation. These results were not independently verified.
- 22 May – At Volnovakha, Donetsk Oblast, 16 Ukrainian soldiers were killed and 12 wounded when separatists attacked their checkpoint with machine guns, hand grenades, RPGs and mortars. Later, two soldiers died of wounds, raising the Ukrainian death toll to 18. Pro-Russian officer Colonel Igor Bezler claimed that he led the ambush, and showed weapons and identification cards of two Ukrainian soldiers allegedly captured after the battle, in an improvised press conference in Horlivka. He acknowledged the death of one of his subordinates. Fighting continued around Mount Karachun, near Slavyansk.
- 26 May – Fighting erupted at Donetsk airport at 13:00, after separatists who had earlier stormed the facilities ignored a Ukrainian ultimatum to withdraw. An airstrike was carried out by Mi-24 helicopters, Sukhoi 25 and MiG-29 aircraft, and Ukrainian paratroopers landed to evict the separatists. Ukrainian officials claimed that an antiaircraft gun was destroyed. "Donetsk republic" sources reported the shoot-down of two helicopters. Both sides claimed to control the airport after the battle died down at late evening. They acknowledged casualties. The local mortuary had 36 bodies killed during the battle, including 33 militants. Donetsk Mayor Oleksander Lukyanchenko reported 43 wounded.
- 29 May – A Ukrainian Mi-8 helicopter was shot down between Kramatorsk and Mount Karachun, killing 14, including General Vladimir Kultchysky. Another soldier was seriously injured.
- 30 May – According to the Ukraine State Border Guard Service, separatists attempted to cross the Ukrainian national border from Russia in Stanytsia-Luhanska. On 29 May armed personnel started gathering near the checkpoint and built barricades. Around 300 armed men surrounded the outpost. At 12:30 AM, the force opened fire at the border guards. They were firing assault rifles and grenade launchers. Border guards returned fire. One guard was injured. They claimed that at the same time at least four ambulances were seen en route. According to Ukrainian officials, separatist forces were firing on residential areas of Sloviansk from a 2S23 "Nona-SVK" self-propelled 120 mm mortar. Another attack was organised at a border post near Dyakovo (south of Antratsyt). Dozens of mortar shells were fired, wounding three. Cossacks were involved in the assault.
- 31 May – At Sloviansk, Ukrainian forces claimed to have knocked down the 2S23 "Nona-SVK" self-propelled 120 mm mortar that had been shelling Ukrainian positions.
- 2 June – Rebels attacked a command center of the Ukrainian border guards (48°31′25″N 39°15′28″E) just south of Luhansk. 5 rebels were killed and 8 were wounded, while 7 border guards were wounded. Contact between the guards and headquarters was lost after a 20-minute truce ended. Russian media reported that between 10 and 15 border guards surrendered; however the Ukrainian government claimed that jets destroyed the militants' equipment and positions, ending the attack. The base was captured on 4 June. The Ukrainian Air Force conducted an airstrike against enemy mortar positions in Luhansk Oblast, claiming two separatists were killed. An air strike on Luhansk RSA was also conducted, killing eight civilians. Ukraine's government blamed a misfired missile shot by separatists. According to the Organization for Security and Co-operation in Europe (OSCE) "these strikes were the result of non-guided rockets shot from an aircraft".
- May 25 – Petro Poroshenko was elected president of Ukraine.
- 6 June – Separatist militias from Slaviansk shot down an An-30 surveillance plane with two shoulder-launched missiles. Ukrainian authorities initially claimed that the pilots survived, but they later reported that five crewmembers were killed, with two others missing. Fighting continued meanwhile on the ground at Slavyansk itself.
- 13 June – Ukrainian officials claimed that their troops wrested control of Mariupol from militants. They destroyed an armoured vehicle and captured about 30 prisoners. A Ukrainian APC violated the Russian border. The APC broke down and another vehicle followed to retrieve the servicemen. The vehicle was prevented from crossing back to Ukraine by Russian border guards, according to FSB.
- 14 June – Ukrainian officials stated that an Il-76 transport plane was shot down by separatists as it approached Luhansk, killing nine crew and 40 troops. Residents said that Ukrainian forces launched air attacks on separatist positions in the vicinity a few hours later. The press service of the Donetsk People's Republic stated that a Ukrainian Su-24 bomber was shot down near Horlivka.
- 17 June – Spokesman for the Ukrainian National Security and Defense Council Volodymyr Chepovy claimed that Ukraine had conducted "a series of successful operations over the past 24 hours" to regain control over the Russia –Ukraine border in which "about 80 militants have been neutralized". He announced that the National Guard had been deployed the day before "at the state border and in populated areas of Donetsk region". A Ukrainian mortar attack killed two Russian reporters in Metalist. It was later claimed that one of the victims had entered Ukraine illegally. Four Ukrainian soldiers from the battalion "Aidar" died during the clashes there.
- 18 June – Ukrainian Army spokesman Vladislav Seleznev announced that a Ukrainian T-64B tank was damaged by separatists around Slaviansk, where he claimed that several pro-Russian firing positions were cleared and separatists killed or wounded.
- 21 June – Three Ukrainian border outposts in Donetsk and Luhansk were attacked. Some 80 Ukrainian border guards at Izvaryne fled across the Russian border, six of them wounded. Two of the wounded suffered critical injuries. The wounded were repatriated, but Ukrainian personnel were held in custody and interrogated by Russian authorities.
- 24 June – The Ukrainian military said that a Mi-8 had been shot down near Slaviansk, killing all nine people on board, while two other soldiers were killed and four wounded during the shelling of a checkpoint.
- 26 June – A separatist armoured column, composed of eight tanks and mortars, attacked a Ukrainian checkpoint near Kramatorsk, killing four soldiers and wounding five. They destroyed four Ukrainian armoured vehicles. Ukraine claimed that one pro-Russian tank was destroyed and one was captured. A pro-Russian tank rammed a roadblock, forcing the soldiers manning it to disperse. Ukraine claimed that another pro-Russian tank was hit by an RPG.
- 27 June – The United Nations refugee agency found that over 110,000 people had fled to Russia, and that tens of thousands more were internally displaced. Of those that fled, about 9,600 filed for asylum.
- 29 June – pro-Russian forces engaged Ukrainian positions in Mount Karachun using tanks and mortars.

== July –September ==
- 1 July – The Ukrainian military renewed their attack to drive out pro-Russian rebels from the areas under their control, staging ground and air assaults. The Ukrainian military conducted artillery barrages on Slovyansk. The villages of Stary-Karavan and Brusivka, south of Krasnyi Lyman, were returned to government control. South-west of Slovyansk, near Andriivka, the television tower on Mount Karachun collapsed after rebel forces shelled Ukrainian positions nearby.
- 3 July – Another Russian border post in Novoshahtinks was damaged by rockets fired from Ukraine. This was the second incident of this kind in Novoshahtinsk since 20 June.
- 4 July – Members of the Ukrainian "Donetsk" battalion launched a raid on the seat of the local prosecutor in Artemivsk, occupied by pro-Russian forces. Two armoured personnel carriers fired on the building, destroying a civilian vehicle and other damage. The armoured vehicles later retreated toward the Kharkiv-Rostov highway. Artemivsk was retaken by Ukrainian forces the following day.
- 5 July – pro-Russian forces abandoned Sloviansk and retreated towards Donetsk City to avoid Ukrainian encirclement. The Ukrainian flag was hoisted over the city council building. An armed group in two vessels and several small craft landed near Sjedove, on the Azov Sea shore, and destroyed a Ukrainian border post and radar station with RPG, mortar and small arms fire. One Ukrainian guard was killed and eight were wounded.
- 6 July – Separatist sources from the Republic of Donetsk claimed that a Ukrainian T-64 was knocked down by a pro-Russian dug-in tank during a battle in Dmytrivka.
- 9 July – pro-Russian forces besieged Luhansk airport. The facilities were shelled using four tanks and two Grad rocket launchers. Ukrainian sources claimed that two tanks and one Grad were destroyed in an air strike.
- 11 July – pro-Russian forces attacked Ukrainian troops with Grad rockets, inflicted damage and casualties on two motorised army brigades at Zelenopyllia, Luhansk Oblast. At least 19 Ukrainian soldiers were reported killed, and around 100 wounded. Fighting continued at evening. It was later claimed that the rocket system used in the attack was the newer 9A52-4 Tornado. Four other Ukrainian servicemen were killed near Dolzhanskyi border post, in Luhansk Oblast, which was in ruins since 9 July, when the facilities were hit by a barrage of 200 rounds from 120 mm mortars.
- 13 July – Three artillery shells hit the Russian town of Donetsk. One civilian died, and two were seriously injured. The Russian Foreign Ministry warned of "irreversible consequences, the responsibility of which lies on the Ukrainian side", labeling the shelling "an aggressive action".
- 14 July – A Ukrainian An-26 transport aircraft was shot down by a surface-to-air missile over eastern Ukraine while flying at 6,500 metres (21,300 ft). The Ukrainian defence minister claimed that the altitude is far from the reach of a shoulder-launched missile, suggesting that the aircraft was downed by Russian forces. Two crewmembers were captured by pro-Russian militiamen, four were rescued by Ukrainian forces, while the other two were found dead on 17 July.
- 16 July – A Ukrainian Su-25 fighter was shot down over eastern Ukraine by a Russian Air Force Su-27, according to the spokesman of Ukraine's National Security Council, Andriy Lysenko. The pilot ejected successfully. The Ukrainian army transferred 15 wounded soldiers from the 72nd armoured brigade to Gukovo, Russia, for medical assistance. The brigade, surrounded by rebel forces in the border town of Chervonopartizansk, had no chance to evacuate the men. Two Ukrainian servicemen from the National Guard were rescued with severe injuries by members of the Russian Federal Security Service in the border area of Kuybyshevsky District, Rostov Oblast. One guard died later from his wounds, while four soldiers were in critical condition. All the Ukrainian personnel were arrested. The border outpost of Izvarine was "cleared of Ukrainian troops", according to the MOD of the self-proclaimed Republic of Donetsk, Igor Strelkov. There were reports of more than 200 fatalities among the Ukrainian forces in this area of the border. Andriy Lysenko acknowledge that "there was not possible" to establish the real number of victims.
- 17 July – In Donetsk Oblast, north of Torez, near the Russian border, Malaysia Airlines Flight MH17, flying from Amsterdam to Kuala Lumpur with 283 passengers and 15 crew members on board, was hit by a surface-to-air missile at an altitude of 10,000 metres (33,000 ft) and crashed. Both the Ukrainian military and the opposition denied responsibility. The US White House confirmed that it was investigating what happened and that it believed the plane involved was a Boeing 777. Malaysian Deputy Foreign Minister Hamzah Zainuddin said that the foreign ministry would work closely with the Russian and Ukrainian governments.
- 23 July – Two Ukrainian Air Force Su-25 fighters were shot down in the rebel-held area of Savur-Mohyla. Ukrainian authorities claimed that they were hit by long-range antiaircraft missiles launched from Russia. Ukrainian Prime Minister Arseniy Yatsenyuk said later in an interview that one of the fighters was probably shot down by an air-to-air missile.
- 27 July – The US State Department produced satellite photos showing that Russian artillery had fired on Ukrainian territory. The photo for 21 July shows marks left by separatist multiple rocket launchers (MLRS) (47°49′48″N 38°47′21″E and 47°52′07″N 38°47′49″E) near Hryhorivka with impacts on Ukrainian positions (47°54′23″N 38°51′22″E and 47°54′27″N 38°53′52″E) in Marynivka. The picture for 23 July showed self-propelled artillery (47°47′43″N 39°03′21″E) south-west of Nova Nadezhda in Russia and a shelled Ukrainian unit (47°54′55″N 39°05′06″E) east of Dibrivka. The image for 25/26 July shows blast marks of MLRS (47°49′14″N 38°59′52″E) also south-west of Nova Nadezhda in Russia and impacts (47°53′02″N 39°09′09″E) on Ukrainian forces south-east of Dibrivka. Ukrainian SBU released more detailed photos but mil.ru claimed that the origin and dates (and on some content) were doctored. Ukrainian Minister of Defence Valeriy Geletey acknowledged that 41 Ukrainian soldiers from the 51st armoured brigade deserted from their besieged border outpost and sought shelter into Russian territory.
- 29 July – Citing US officials,CNN reported that the Ukrainian army fired three OTR-21 Tochka tactical ballistic missiles at pro-Russian militias near Snizhne. Twenty-one soldiers from the 24th armoured brigade, who had been evacuated through the Russian region of Kuibyshev after enduring heavy Grad rocket attacks, arrived in Zaporozhie, the brigade's headquarters. Several suffered from shell shock.
- 31 July – Ukrainian sources acknowledged that Savur-Mohyla had changed hands several times. They claimed that Russian forces would cross the border claiming to be "peacekeeping troops".
- 1 August – The Ukrainian army withdrew troops from several border areas, such as Dovzhansky, Izvaryne and Chervonopartyzansk, where the daily shelling and Grad rocket fire made their positions untenable. The 79th and 72nd airborne brigades, deployed around Dyakovo, were among the retreating units.
- 3 August – Armed Forces of Ukraine announced that they had split Donetsk and Luhansk, separating the two rebel republics. On the border, Ukrainian units were shelled again from Russia. Near Chervonopartyzansk, soldiers of the 72nd Mechanized Brigade endured six hours of heavy artillery fire. The next day, the bulk of the brigade, encircled near Chervonopartyzansk on the border east of Sverdlovsk mostly broke through to Ukrainian-held territory; other soldiers who covered the departure finally escaped to a Russian border post in Gukovo. Between 311 (according to Ukrainian officials), 438 (according to Russian FSB sources) and 449 (as per OSCE observers) Ukrainian soldiers and border guards had lain down their weapons and crossed into Russia since 2 August.
- 7 August – pro-Russian forces shot down a Ukrainian Air Force MiG-29 with a "Buk" SAM near Yenakievo. The pilot ejected and separatist sources later claimed he was captured and interrogated. Meanwhile, a Mi-8 helicopter used for medical evacuation crash-landed after it was hit by rebel gunfire.
- 8 August – Amvrosiivka and surrounding Ukrainian checkpoints were shelled by Russian troops across the border.
- 9 August – A multiple-weapon unit from Russia attacked the border checkpoint of Milove. The attackers used RPO-A Shmel flamethrowers and mine-scattering shells. Four Ukrainian guards were injured when they stepped on mines.
- 10 August – pro-Russian forces repelled a Ukrainian army assault led by four battalions on the rebel-held town of Ilovaysk.
- 16 August – Although Russia denied aiding or sending troops into Ukraine, Alexander Zakharchenko, the newly appointed leader of the self-proclaimed Donetsk People's Republic admitted in a video released on 16 August that the rebel forces were in the process of receiving 150 armoured vehicles, including about 30 tanks, which may refer to the column of Russian vehicles seen crossing into Ukraine earlier. Moreover, he stated that 1,200 new fighters who spent 4 months training in Russia would be joining his forces. He did not specify the source of the vehicles. The video was recorded on 15 August. On 18 August Zakharchenko claimed that all military equipment of the Donetsk People's Republic was taken from the Ukrainian military "The hardware that our enemy gives us by abandoning it is enough for us".
- 17 August – Fierce fighting was reported around Savur-Mohyla hill, where pro-Russian forces launched a major counter-attack. Separatist militias from Luhansk shot down a Mikoyan MiG-29 aircraft.
- 19 August – The commander of the Donbas Battalion, Semen Semenchenko, was wounded in battle in Ilovaisk. Minister of Internal Affairs Arsen Avakov announced that Semenchevo would be awarded the order of Bogdan Khmelnitsky. He suffered shrapnel injuries in his hip and back, and underwent a successful surgery at a Dnipropetrovsk hospital. After an increasing number of casualties, including four soldiers killed, the battalion left the battlefield later that day.
- 20 August – Ukrainian troops repulsed a tank attack in the area of Ilovaisk, and managed to recapture most of the city.
- 22 August – The first Russian humanitarian convoy, parked for several days at Izvaryne checkpoint, eventually moved into Ukraine without the permission of Ukrainian authorities. The convoy passed through Krasnodon, Samsonivka, Lyse, Burchak-Myhailivka and Nikolaevka via dirt roads before reaching Luhansk city.
- 23 August – Heavily armed men with Russian accents set up a road block southwest of Amvrosiivka, near the settlement of Kolosky, about 10 kilometres from the border.
- 24 August – Ukrainian media reported that Russian army armoured forces equipped with 250 vehicles and artillery had entered Amvrosiivka, in what seemed to be a major offensive against Mariupol. Earlier, five pro-Russian tanks, supported by Grad rocket fire, had overrun a Ukrainian checkpoint at Olenivka. Telmanovo was also allegedly taken over by separatist forces, although denied by Ukrainian officials.
- 25 August – Ukraine claimed that Russian armoured forces, in the guise of pro-Russian militants, had invaded the area surrounding Novoazovsk, and that battles were ongoing around Shcherbak and Markyne. The Russian column consisted of 10 tanks, two armoured fighting vehicles and two Ural trucks. According to the same sources, the offensive was blocked, two Russian tanks were destroyed, and 10 members of "an intelligence-sabotage group" seized. The surviving vehicles broke in the direction of Telmanovo. At evening, fighting continued to rage at Shcherbak and Huselshchykove. The commander of the "Donbas" battalion, Semen Semenchenko, reported that the strength of the Russian column was 50 vehicles, and that some of them headed towards Amvrosiivka. In Illovaisk, the commander of Ukraine's "Kherson" battalion was killed in battle.
- 26 August – Ukraine captured 10 Russian paratroopers near Dzerkalne (20 km from the Russian border) who according to Russia "crossed [the Ukrainian border] by accident on an unmarked section" and according to Ukraine "were carrying out a special mission". Fighting around Novoazovsk continued. Ukrainian media reported that 30 Russian tanks, armoured personnel carriers and infantry from Taganrog took over six villages around there, initially denied by Ukrainian officials. The separatists claimed that they took control of the road section between Kuznetzovo-Mykhailivka, in Telmanovo region, and Novoazovsk.
- 27 August – Rebels shelled the Government-held town/port of Novoazovsk as a counter-offensive and was able to push into the port. Ukrainian military sources acknowledged that rebel and Russian forces captured seven settlements north and northeast of Novoazovsk. They also admitted the fall of Starobesheve, southeast of Donetsk City, to Russian occupiers. At evening it was learned from the commander of a Ukrainian army special company in the area that Russian tanks had overrun Novoazovsk and that Russian troops were in control. The Ukrainian command ship Donbas shot down a Russian drone in the Azov sea, off Mariupol. Savur-Mohyla hill was taken over by pro-Russian forces after several days of fighting.
- 29 August – Another Ukrainian Su-25 fighter was shot down in eastern Ukraine by a surface-to-air missile. The pilot ejected safely.
- 30 August – According to Semenchenko, Ukrainian President Petro Poroshenko agreed with pro-Russian rebels to use a corridor to withdraw Ukrainian troops besieged at Illovaisk. The troops would be allowed to flee carrying with them their side arms and battle flags. The Ukrainian who had been taken prisoners would be exchanged later for Russian troops at Kharkiv. Earlier, the Ukrainian Security Council had acknowledged that their forces were completely surrounded at Illovaisk. The following day, Russian-backed forces destroyed a column of more than 30 military vehicles in and around Novokaterynivka near Starobesheve southeast of Donetsk. The column was apparently retreating south after it was encircled in the closing stages of the Battle of Ilovaisk. The circumstances of the conflict are disputed. Ukrainian forces accused pro-Russian rebels of reneging in safe passage for encircled Ukrainian troops. Ukrainian battalions claimed that pro-Russians killed hundreds and took dozens prisoner after Ukrainian forces came with white flags. The rebel side reported that they broke the agreement and did not surrender heavy equipment, a condition set for a safe retreat. The condition of retreat were communicated as retreat with heavy equipment by the BBC. Some troops from Illovaisk area had broken the encirclement in small groups up to company size and escaped.
- 31 August – Separatist forces attacked the Zhuk-class patrol boat BG-119 and a Kalkan-class patrol cutter belonging to the Mariupol Sea Guard Detachment in the Sea of Azov. The shelling lighted up and sank the BG-119 and damaged the Kalkan-class, prompting the later to leave. More vessels were deployed to rescue the sunken boat's crew, 8 sailors were rescued of which 7 were wounded.
- 1 September – Ukrainian Minister of Defense Valeriy Geletey declared that the ATO was over, and that Ukraine was facing a "Russian full-scale invasion". He stressed the need to "build a defense against Russia not only in the areas formerly occupied by terrorists, but also in other regions of the country". Advisor of the Ministry of Internal Affairs Anton Heraschenko said that the Russian invasion didn't start with the offensive on Novoazovsk on 27 August, but with the assault of two Russian airborne divisions from Ryazan and Kostroma into the areas of Savur-Mohyla and Amvrosiivka on 24 August. After enduring assaults for weeks, Ukrainian troops were forced to retreat from Luhansk airport and other locations including Shchastia, the last Ukrainian stronghold around Luhansk city.
- 4 September – Ukrainian troops left the town Debal'tsevo under separatist and Russian pressure, according to a battalion commander, amid fears of encirclement.
- 5 September – In Minsk representatives of Ukraine, Russia and pro-Russian rebels signed the Minsk Protocol, which established a ceasefire that entered into force at 18:00.
- 10 September – Ukrainian sources reported that the Donetsk airport was successfully defended against an assault by pro-Russian armoured forces overnight. Heavy shelling resumed on three districts of Donetsk City at evening.
- 14 September – pro-Russian forces, supported by six tanks and Grad rocket fire, attempted to storm the airport of Donetsk once again. Additionally, the city's Mayor said that the districts of Kuibyshev and Kyiv were hit by heavy shelling. There were civilian casualties. It was later learned that three Ukrainian soldiers were killed and several wounded.
- 19 September – A memorandum was signed in Minsk between the parties that had agreed on 5 September ceasefire. The nine-point document established a 30 km buffer zone dividing the warring factions, where all weapons with a calibre exceeding 100 mm were banned.
- 22 September – Ukrainian troops in Donetsk airport repelled a pro-Russian assault led by tanks and supported by "Tyulpan" self-propelled mortars. In Donetsk City, heavy bombardment killed one civilian in the district of Kuybishev. Several houses and gas pipelines were damaged.
- 23 September – Ukrainian forces built a defensive line in Mariupol from the eastern outskirts of the city to Volnovakha, where a pro-Russian offensive from the direction of Novotroitske was halted the day before.
- 25 September – Donetsk airport was struck by heavy shelling at late evening, as well as Donetsk City's district of Kyiv. Large fires could be seen at both locations.
- 26 September – Fighting was reported around Donetsk airport, and in Debaltseve a Ukrainian outpost and civilian houses were attacked with Grad rockets. Ukrainian troops returned fire. A meeting between Ukrainian and pro-Russian officers took place at Soledar, Donetsk Oblast, to talk about the implementation of the artillery buffer zone and the clearing of minefields in accordance with the Minsk agreements.
- 28 September – The commander of a company of the Ukrainian army's 93rd armoured brigade, the main unit defending Donetsk airport, was killed in the course of a pro-Russian tank assault on the facilities.
- 30 September – pro-Russian tanks attacked Donetsk airport at 6:15 a.m. In the region of Mariupol, Ukrainian Marines claimed to have destroyed a separatist truck and a mortar position at Hranitne. Ukrainian forces lost a total of 1,159 armoured vehicles of all types between July and September.

== October – December ==
- 1 October – Donetsk City Council reported the death of nine civilians and injuries on another 30 as a result of heavy shelling. One artillery round landed on a bus station in the district of Kyiv, killing six and wounding 25. Three others were killed and five wounded when a school was hit in the same area. Pro-Russian militias stormed Donetsk airport, briefly capturing two buildings in the airport terminal. According to Ukrainian sources, four attempts by the rebels to break through the defensive lines yielded a temporary success in taking over the terminal, but the rebels were eventually evicted. The Ukrainian army claimed that seven militants were killed and ten wounded in the action vs no Ukrainian casualties.
- 3 October – The old terminal of Donetsk airport was stormed by pro-Russian troops. The first floor was occupied by the attackers, later driven out. Part of the building was set ablaze. One Ukrainian soldier died and three were injured. Ukrainian troops and residential areas in Debaltseve came under an intense Grad rocket barrage. Several houses were damaged.
- 4 October – pro-Russian forces carried out two assaults on Donetsk airport supported by artillery and tanks, but their attempts were beaten off.
- 8 October – Separatist sources claimed that their forces were encircling Ukrainian troops in Debaltseve from the west and northwest. They reported that the rebels were using a captured 2S3 Akatsiya self-propelled howitzer.
- 10 October – Shelling in Donetsk City killed three residents and wounded another five. Artillery shells hit the districts of Kuybishev, Kyiv and Leninsky.
- 14 October – Seven civilians were killed and 17 wounded in Sartana, northeast of Mariupol, by Grad rockets fired from Kominternove. The city council declared 15 October a day of mourning to honour the victims. Artillery fire resumed that afternoon against the Ukrainian checkpoint in Talakovka, where several houses were set on fire the day before. Members of a self-dubbed "Army of the Don", who did not follow orders from the Luhansk People's Republic and apparently proceeded under their own initiative. They launched 20 Grad rocket salvos on four Ukrainian checkpoints around Bakhmutka. Hours later they launched an offensive on Ukrainian redoubts with tanks, anti-tank missiles and RPGs. Three Ukrainian armoured vehicles were knocked down, and Cossack troops ordered a Ukrainian National Guard outpost to surrender, demanding that the guards hand over their positions. One guard was reported killed and five other wounded.
- 18 October – In Smile, near Bakhmutka, two Ukrainian servicemen were wounded in a renewed pro-Russian assault on a security checkpoint. The attack was beaten off after a four-hour battle. Earlier, the Ukrainian military acknowledged that 11 soldiers were missing after the beginning of the pro-Russian offensive on 15 October. The sources claimed that they knew the whereabouts of two of the troops. It was later learned that the missing were members of the "Aidar" battalion and that six of the men were recovered by friendly forces.
- 19 October – Near Smile fighting was reported. Ukrainian media said that rebels attempted to erect a blockade and ambushed supply convoys to Ukrainian checkpoints. At evening, the militias launched an offensive supported by tanks. Some 200 Ukrainian troops were surrounded by pro-Russian forces, according to the separatists.
- 22 October – Ukraine's MOD announced that the whereabouts of five soldiers who went missing on 16 October were still unknown. Three armoured carriers they were riding on were destroyed in combat.
- 27 October – The Ukrainian army evacuated checkpoint 32 with their equipment. The checkpoint, near Smile, had been surrounded by pro-Russian militias since mid-October. The relief column recovered the remains of at least four KIA. The Ukrainian military later acknowledged that ten soldiers had died in the outpost since September, and that "several others" were still missing.
- 1 November – In Mariupol, Ukrainian tanks returned fire on rebel positions and successfully engaged enemy tanks, according to Ukrainian sources.
- 15 November – Separatist sources claimed that their troops destroyed one tank and five armoured personnel carriers in Donetsk airport.
- 17 November – The Donetsk airport and the surrounding region were the target of rebel artillery. The airport and Pisky were attacked with mortars and tanks, and heavy shelling was reported in settlements including Avdiivka, Maiorsk, Maryinka, Krasnohoryvka, Slavne and Taramchuk. The Ukrainian military claimed that return fire killed at least 20 militants. In Luhansk Oblast harassing fire targeted Ukrainian troops around Stanytsia Luhanska, while Shchastya was hit by Grad rockets. In Donetsk local authorities reported one civilian resident killed and eight wounded over the weekend as a consequence of shelling in the district of Kyiv. Ukrainian officials said that pro-Russian forces were set to take control of Bakhmutka road, which would have allowed separatists to threaten Shchastya from the west. Grad rockets and mortar rounds were fired on Ukrainian roadblocks in Krimsky, Novoaidar and Trokhizbenka. Ukrainian positions at Hirske were hit by rocket-propelled grenades and mortars, while a checkpoint near Frunze was attacked with antitank missiles.
- 29 November – Separatist infantry launched an attack on Donetsk airport, supported by Grad rocket fire.
- 1 December – Luhansk Governor Hennadiy Moskal said that right after a Grad rocket attack on the city, rebels burst into downtown Stanytsia Luhanska, where a firefight erupted. The town council and other buildings were damaged. Eight other settlements in Luhansk Oblast were the target of mortar, artillery and multiple rocket fire. Ukrainian media published videos of separatist Grad launchers firing on Pisky from behind apartment buildings at Maksyma Kozyrya street in Donetsk.
- 3 December – A volley of Grad rockets fired from Sakhanka hit Ukrainian outposts around Mariupol at noon, specially in the eastern district of the city and in Talakovka. Some National Guard soldiers were wounded.
- 5 December – Rebel militias carried out two assaults on Donetsk airport using tanks, grenade launchers and small arms. They briefly took control of the old terminal, but paratroopers retook the building by evening.
- 9 December – At 9 AM a renewed "silent mode" was agreed between the Ukrainian military and separatist militias, pending further talks in Minsk.
- 12 December – Members of the "Azov" battalion in Hnutove said they learned from local residents that pro-Russian armoured units had broken into Pavlopil, where they raised the flag of "Novorossiya". According to the soldiers, a patrol of scouts sent to investigate was ambushed when they tried to enter the occupied settlement. Two servicemen were reported killed and three wounded during the engagement, and a light vehicle hit a landmine. The militias also suffered casualties, and withdrew from the battlefield. They came back supported by armoured vehicles which sprayed the village with heavy fire, in the belief that Ukrainian troops were entrenched in the main buildings. The OSCE mission later confirmed that militiamen from the Donetsk people's republic forced them to withdraw from Pavlopil.
- 22 December – Luhansk Governor Hennady Moskal reported eight attacks in the region by 8 AM. He claimed that pro-Russian forces used mortars, artillery and Grad rockets to pound Shchastya and Krimsky. Krimsky was the target of antitank missiles and Grad rockets. No casualties were incurred. Peace talks were to continue in Minsk on 24 and 26 December according to Poroshenko, after a phone conversation between Angela Merkel, Francois Hollande, and Putin.
- 23 December – pro-Russian guerrillas blew up a railway bridge over the Kalchyk river in Mariupol. Attackers previously shot three security guards from the nearby Azovstal steel mill, killing one and wounding another. The bombing interrupted steel production and stopped harbour operations. The Ukrainian Minister of Internal Affairs sent in 100 agents from the "Sokol" special operations force.
- 25 December – Near Donetsk Ukraine's government and separatists began an exchange of POWs, as agreed on 24 December. By evening, BTR armoured personnel carriers and tanks from Shumy launched an attack on pro-Russian positions at Horlivka and Izotove mining complex.
- 29 December – Ukrainian paratroopers fought off a major assault near Donetsk airport. Three Ukrainian soldiers and 14 militants were reported killed, while one attacker was captured. Later, the Ukrainian military reported that the attack took place in Pisky, and was preceded by mortar and automatic grenade launcher fire. After the ill-fated storming, the rebels resumed shelling with RPGs, mortars and tanks. Heavy shelling resumed in Donetsk City, where artillery fire was reported in the district of Kalinin.
