= Anatoli Sigachyov =

Russian footballer

Personal information
- Full name: Anatoli Vladimirovich Sigachyov
- Date of birth: 4 October 1974 (age 52)
- Place of birth: Dmitriyevka, Tambov Oblast, Russian SFSR
- Height: 1.83 m (6 ft 0 in)
- Position: Forward

Senior career*
| Years | Team | Apps | (Gls) |
| 1992–1993 | FC Spartak Tambov | 62 | (20) |
| 1994 | FC Arsenal Tula | 24 | (6) |
| 1995–1999 | FC Don Novomoskovsk | 156 | (69) |
| 2000 | FC Metallurg Lipetsk | 13 | (2) |
| 2000 | FC Don Novomoskovsk | 19 | (9) |
| 2001–2004 | FC Spartak Tambov | 99 | (37) |
| 2005 | FC Avangard Kursk | 34 | (6) |
- * Club domestic league appearances and goals

Anatoli Vladimirovich Sigachyov (Russian: Анатолий Владимирович Сигачёв; born October 4, 1974) is a retired Russian professional football player.

== Club career ==
He played two seasons in the Russian Football National League for FC Metallurg Lipetsk and FC Avangard Kursk.

== Honours ==
- Russian Second Division Zone Center top scorer: 2004 (16 goals).
