= Nikiforovsky District =

Nikiforovsky District Никифоровский район (Russian)
- District
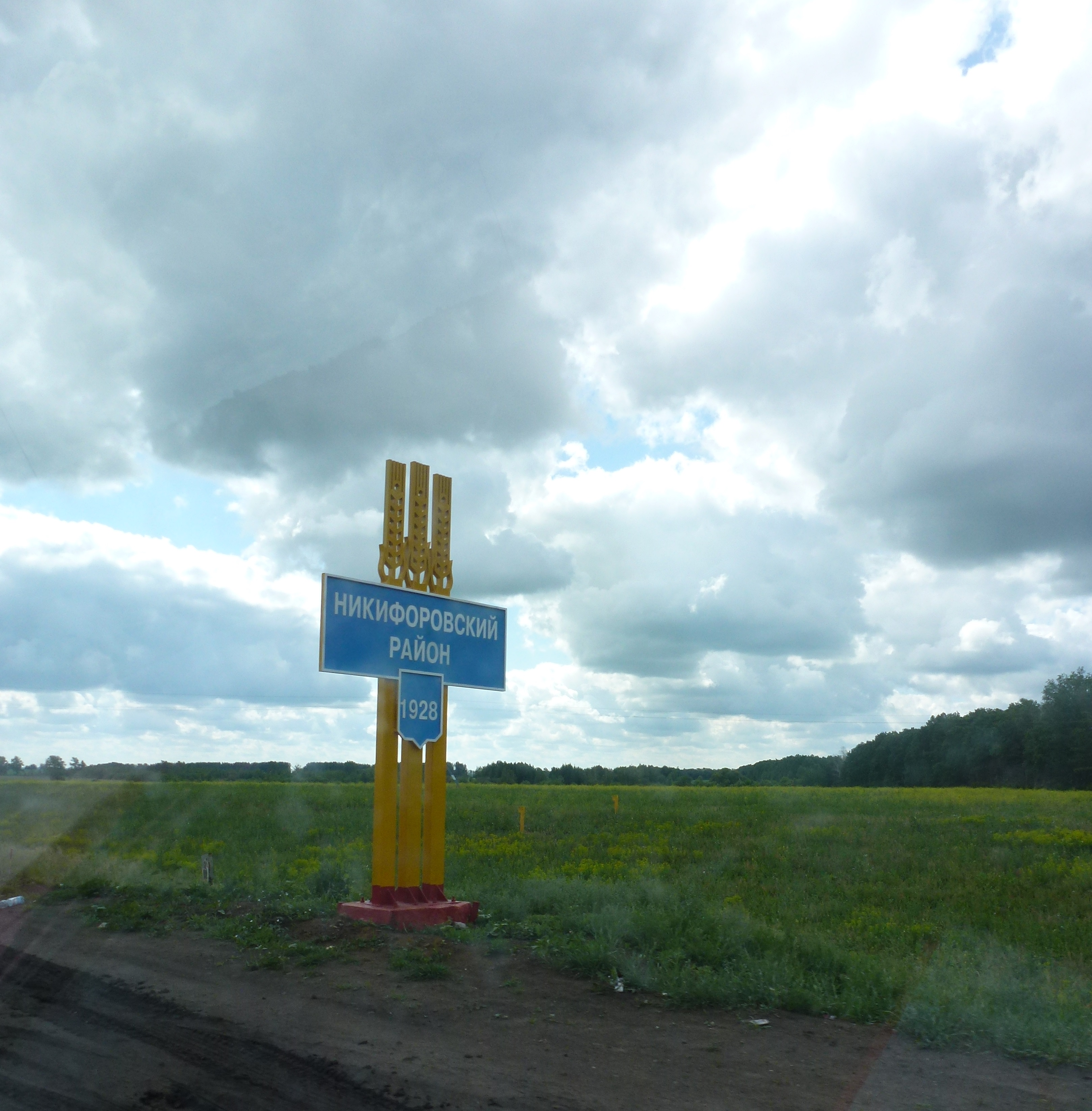
- Entrance to Nikiforovsky District

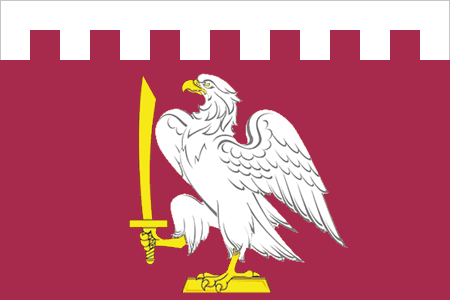
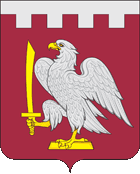
- Flag Coat of arms
- Location of Nikiforovsky District in Tambov Oblast
- Coordinates: 52°53′04″N 40°47′22″E
- Country: Russia
- Federal subject: Tambov Oblast
- Established: 1928
- Administrative center: Dmitriyevka

Area
  - Total: 1,191.4 km^{2} (460.0 sq mi)

Population (2010 Census)
  - Total: 20,066
  - Density: 16.842/km^{2} (43.622/sq mi)
  - Urban: 42.0%
  - Rural: 58.0%

Administrative structure
  - Administrative divisions: 1 Settlement councils, 5 Selsoviets
  - Inhabited localities: 1 urban-type settlements, 56 rural localities

Municipal structure
  - Municipally incorporated as: Nikiforovsky Municipal District
  - Municipal divisions: 1 urban settlements, 5 rural settlements
- Time zone: UTC+3 (MSK)
- OKTMO ID: 68620000
- Website: http://r36.tambov.gov.ru/

Nikiforovsky District (Russian: Ники́форовский райо́н) is an administrative and municipal district (raion), one of the twenty-three in Tambov Oblast, Russia. It is located in the west and northwest of the oblast. The area of the district is 1,191.4 square kilometers (460.0 sq mi). Its administrative center is the urban locality (a work settlement) of Dmitriyevka. Population: 20,066 (2010 Census); 22,970 (2002 census); 26,181 (1989 Soviet census). The population of the administrative center accounts for 42.0% of the district's total population.

== Geography ==
Nikiforovsky District is in the north-central region of Tambov Oblast, about 40 km west of the city of Tambov, and 15 km east of Michurinsk. The Bolshoy Voronezh River runs from north-to-south through the district. The river is a tributary of the Voronezh River, and part of the Don River basin. The terrain is flat with draws and ravines, with steppe and forest-steppe vegetation. The black soil of the district supports agriculture, and there are deposits of limestone and other minerals in the area.

The district is elongated in shape, measuring about 110 km north–south and 25 km west–east. The administrative center of the district is the city of Demitriyevka. The Lipetsk-Tambov highway runs across the middle of the district, as does the Moscow-Volgograd (E119) highway. Subdivisions of the district include one urban and 5 rural settlements. In the east-center of the district is the Ozero Yaroslavlskoye, a large reservoir.

As of January, 2016, the three largest towns are Demitrievka (pop. 7,751), Ekaterinin (pop. 2,749), and Saburo-Pokrovskoye (pop. 2,748). To the north, the area is bordered by Sosnovsky District, in the east by Tambovsky District, in the south by Petrovsky District, and in the west by Michurinsky District.

=== Climate ===
Average January temperature in Demitrievka is −10 °C (14 °F), and average July temperature is 20 °C (68 °F). Annual precipitation is 546 millimeters (21.5 in), and falls mostly in April through October. The climate is Humid continental climate, cool summer, (Dfb). This climate is characterized by large swings in temperature, both diurnally and seasonally, with mild summers and cold, snowy winters.

== History ==
As with much of the north Tambov region, significant settlement began in 1635, with the building of the Belgorod Line, and the expansion of the fort as Kozlov (now the town of Michurinsky, 20 km to the west) The line of fortifications from Belgorod to Simbirsk ran through what is now the Nikiforovsky District, leaving many sites of archaeological and cultural significance.

In 1869, the South East Railway laid tracks through the district, on which the Nikiforovko station was built.

During the Great Patriotic War, over 14,000 citizens of Nikiforovsky District were enlisted in the Red Army; 6,436 did not return.

== Economy ==
Employment in the district is focused on food processing, light industry, and agriculture.

=== Agriculture ===
Nikiforovsky is an agricultural district, with farm revenues split about 65% crops and 35% livestock. The most important grains are wheat, barley and sunflower. Approximately 70,336 hectares (60%) of the total area of the district is in cultivation for crops. In 2014, the top seven crops by area were:

Crop	Cultivated Area (ha)	% of Cultivated Area
Winter wheat	18,143	28
Summer Barley	15,150	23
Sunflower grain	13,548	21
Spring wheat	6,006	9
Soybeans	4,591	7
Sugar beet (factory)	3,772	6
Peas	2,756	4

=== Transportation ===
The Michurinsk-Tambov line of the South Easter Railway crosses Nikiforovsky District through the town of Demitrievka, with the main station 'Nikiforovka', and other stations about every 20 km. Detailed route map of South East Railway (in Russian) An E119 highway, from the north to Tambov, runs west-east across the middle of the district.

== Culture ==
The Catherine Arboretum and experimental plant institute displays 230 species of trees and shrubs; it was founded in the 19th century by a local landlord, AA Ushakov.

== Notable residents ==
- Nadezhda Markina (born 1959 in Dmitriyevka), actress
- Anatoli Sigachyov (born 1974 in Dmitriyevka), football player
