= Dmitriyevka, Mazanovsky District, Amur Oblast =

Dmitriyevka Дмитриевка
- Selo
- Location within Amur Oblast Location within Russia
- Coordinates: 51°20′N 128°55′E
- Country: Russia
- Region: Amur Oblast
- District: Mazanovsky District
- Time zone: UTC+9:00

Dmitriyevka (Russian: Дмитриевка) is a rural locality (a selo) and the administrative center of Dmitriyevsky Selsoviet of Mazanovsky District, Amur Oblast, Russia. The population was 168 as of 2018. There are 7 streets.

== Geography ==
Dmitriyevka is located on the left bank of the Birma River, 46 km south of Novokiyevsky Uval (the district's administrative centre) by road. Kanichi is the nearest rural locality.
