= Dmitriyevka, Ivanovsky District, Amur Oblast =

Dmitriyevka Дмитриевка
- Selo
- Location within Amur Oblast Location within Russia
- Coordinates: 50°24′N 127°56′E
- Country: Russia
- Region: Amur Oblast
- District: Ivanovsky District
- Time zone: UTC+9:00

Dmitriyevka (Russian: Дмитриевка) is a rural locality (a selo) in Dmitriyevsky Selsoviet of Ivanovsky District, Amur Oblast, Russia. The population was 965 as of 2018. There are 9 streets.

== Geography ==
Dmitriyevka is located near the right bank of the Ivanovka River, 9 km north of Ivanovka (the district's administrative centre) by road. Ivanovka is the nearest rural locality.
