= Dmitriyevka, Beloozersky Selsoviet, Gafuriysky District, Republic of Bashkortostan =

Dmitriyevka Дмитриевка
- Village
- Location within Bashkortostan Location within Russia
- Coordinates: 54°00′N 56°18′E
- Country: Russia
- Region: Bashkortostan
- District: Gafuriysky District
- Time zone: UTC+5:00

Dmitriyevka (Russian: Дмитриевка) is a rural locality (a village) in Beloozersky Selsoviet, Gafuriysky District, Bashkortostan, Russia. The population was 127 as of 2010.

== Geography ==
It is located 21 km from Krasnousolsky and 5 km from Beloye Ozero.
