= Dmitriyevka, Vladimir Oblast =

Dmitriyevka Дмитриевка
- Village
- Location within Vladimir Oblast Location within Russia
- Coordinates: 55°37′N 41°53′E
- Country: Russia
- Region: Vladimir Oblast
- District: Muromsky District
- Time zone: UTC+3:00

Dmitriyevka (Russian: Дми́триевка) is a rural locality (a village) in Kovarditskoye Rural Settlement, Muromsky District, Vladimir Oblast, Russia. The population was 10 as of 2010.

== Geography ==
Dmitriyevka is located 13 km northwest of Murom (the district's administrative centre) by road. Valovo is the nearest rural locality.
