= Dmitriyevka, Karmaskalinsky District, Republic of Bashkortostan =

Dmitriyevka Дмитриевка
- Village
- Location within Bashkortostan Location within Russia
- Coordinates: 54°15′N 56°17′E
- Country: Russia
- Region: Bashkortostan
- District: Karmaskalinsky District
- Time zone: UTC+5:00

Dmitriyevka (Russian: Дмитриевка) is a rural locality (a village) in Yefremkinsky Selsoviet, Karmaskalinsky District, Bashkortostan, Russia. The population was 205 as of 2010. There are 2 streets.

== Geography ==
Dmitriyevka is located 18 km southeast of Karmaskaly (the district's administrative centre) by road. Yefremkino is the nearest rural locality.
