= Dmitriyevka, Sterlibashevsky District, Republic of Bashkortostan =

Dmitriyevka Дмитриевка
- Village
- Location within Bashkortostan Location within Russia
- Coordinates: 53°26′N 55°27′E
- Country: Russia
- Region: Bashkortostan
- District: Sterlibashevsky District
- Time zone: UTC+5:00

Dmitriyevka (Russian: Дмитриевка) is a rural locality (a village) in Starokalkashevsky Selsoviet, Sterlibashevsky District, Bashkortostan, Russia. The population was 2 as of 2010. There is 1 street.

== Geography ==
Dmitriyevka is located 22 km east of Sterlibashevo (the district's administrative centre) by road. Chegodayevka is the nearest rural locality.
