= Dmytrivka =

Dmytrivka (Ukrainian: Дмитрівка) is a popular name for populated places in Ukraine and can refer to:

== Urban-type settlements ==
- Dmytrivka, Chernihiv Oblast, an urban-type settlement in Chernihiv Oblast

== Villages ==
- Dmytrivka, Shakhtarsk Raion, a village in Donetsk Oblast
- Dmytrivka, Volnovakha Raion, a village in Donetsk Oblast
- Dmytrivka, Slovyansk Raion, a village in Donetsk Oblast
- Dmytrivka, Izium Raion, a village in Kharkiv Oblast
- Dmytrivka, Kyiv Oblast, a village in Kyiv Oblast
- Dmytrivka, Bolhrad Raion, Odesa Oblast, a village in Odesa Oblast
- Dmytrivka, Kiliya Raion, a village in Odesa Oblast
- Dmytrivka, Lyman Raion, a village in Odesa Oblast

== See also ==
- Dmitriyevka, the Russian equivalent
