= Dmitriyevka, Yakovlevsky District, Belgorod Oblast =

Dmitriyevka Дмитриевка
- Selo
- Location within Belgorod Oblast Location within Russia
- Coordinates: 50°49′N 36°20′E
- Country: Russia
- Region: Belgorod Oblast
- District: Yakovlevsky District
- Time zone: UTC+3:00

Dmitriyevka (Russian: Дмитриевка) is a rural locality (a selo) and the administrative center of Dmitriyevskoye Rural Settlement, Yakovlevsky District, Belgorod Oblast, Russia. The population was 1,002 as of 2010. There are ten streets.

== Geography ==
Dmitriyevka is located 15 km northwest of Stroitel (the district's administrative centre) by road. Olkhovka is the nearest rural locality.
