= Dmitriyevka, Olkhovsky District, Volgograd Oblast =

Dmitriyevka Дмитриевка
- Selo
- Location within Volgograd Oblast Location within Russia
- Coordinates: 49°41′N 44°19′E
- Country: Russia
- Region: Volgograd Oblast
- District: Olkhovsky District
- Time zone: UTC+4:00

Dmitriyevka (Russian: Дми́триевка) is a rural locality (a selo) in Solodchinskoye Rural Settlement, Olkhovsky District, Volgograd Oblast, Russia. The population was 87 as of 2010.

== Geography ==
Dmitriyevka is located in steppe, on the right bank of the Ilovlya River, 30 km southwest of Olkhovka (the district's administrative centre) by road. Zakharovka is the nearest rural locality.
