= Dmitriyevka, Paninsky District, Voronezh Oblast =

Dmitriyevka Дмитриевка
- Selo
- Location within Voronezh Oblast Location within Russia
- Coordinates: 51°44′N 40°05′E
- Country: Russia
- Region: Voronezh Oblast
- District: Paninsky District
- Time zone: UTC+3:00

Dmitriyevka (Russian: Дмитриевка) is a rural locality (a selo) and the administrative center of Dmitriyevskoye Rural Settlement, Paninsky District, Voronezh Oblast, Russia. The population was 356 as of 2010. There are 7 streets.

== Geography ==
Dmitriyevka is located 19 km north of Panino (the district's administrative centre) by road. Perelyovshino is the nearest rural locality.
