= Dmitriyevka, Zilairsky District, Republic of Bashkortostan =

Dmitriyevka Дмитриевка
- Village
- Location within Bashkortostan Location within Russia
- Coordinates: 52°24′N 57°12′E
- Country: Russia
- Region: Bashkortostan
- District: Zilairsky District
- Time zone: UTC+5:00

Dmitriyevka (Russian: Дмитриевка) is a rural locality (a village) in Dmitriyevsky Selsoviet, Zilairsky District, Bashkortostan, Russia. The population was 224 as of 2010. There are 6 streets.

== Geography ==
Dmitriyevka is located 29 km northwest of Zilair (the district's administrative centre) by road. Saratovsky is the nearest rural locality.
