= Dmitriyevka, Pervomaysky Selsoviet, Meleuzovsky District, Republic of Bashkortostan =

Dmitriyevka Дмитриевка
- Village
- Location within Bashkortostan Location within Russia
- Coordinates: 52°53′N 56°03′E
- Country: Russia
- Region: Bashkortostan
- District: Meleuzovsky District
- Time zone: UTC+5:00

Dmitriyevka (Russian: Дмитриевка) is a rural locality (a village) in Pervomaysky Selsoviet, Meleuzovsky District, Bashkortostan, Russia. The population was 5 as of 2010.

== Geography ==
It is located 12 km from Meleuz, 5 km from Pervomayskaya.
