= Dmitriyevka, Buturlinovsky District, Voronezh Oblast =

Dmitriyevka Дмитриевка
- Selo
- Location within Voronezh Oblast Location within Russia
- Coordinates: 50°46′N 40°31′E
- Country: Russia
- Region: Voronezh Oblast
- District: Buturlinovsky District
- Time zone: UTC+3:00

Dmitriyevka (Russian: Дмитриевка) is a rural locality (a selo) in Beryozovskoye Rural Settlement, Buturlinovsky District, Voronezh Oblast, Russia. The population was 292 as of 2010. There are 4 streets.

== Geography ==
Dmitriyevka is located 8 km southwest of Buturlinovka (the district's administrative centre) by road. Buturlinovka is the nearest rural locality.
