= Dmitriyevka, Astrakhan Oblast =

Dmitriyevka Дмитриевка
- Selo
- Location within Astrakhan Oblast Location within Russia
- Coordinates: 48°24′N 46°00′E
- Country: Russia
- Region: Astrakhan Oblast
- District: Akhtubinsky District
- Time zone: UTC+4:00

Dmitriyevka (Russian: Дмитриевка) is a rural locality (a selo) in Pokrovsky Selsoviet of Akhtubinsky District, Astrakhan Oblast, Russia. The population was 19 as of 2010. There is 1 street.

== Geography ==
Dmitriyevka is located 18 km (11 mi) northwest of Akhtubinsk (the district's administrative centre) by road. Pokrovka is the nearest rural locality.
