= Dmitriyevka, Altai Republic =

Dmitriyevka Дмитриевка
- Village
- Location within Altai Republic Location within Russia
- Coordinates: 52°26′N 86°55′E
- Country: Russia
- Region: Altai Republic
- District: Turochaksky District
- Time zone: UTC+7:00

Dmitriyevka (Russian: Дмитриевка; Altay: Салазан, Salazan) is a rural locality (a selo) in Dmitriyevskoye Rural Settlement of Turochaksky District, the Altai Republic, Russia. The population was 607 as of 2016. There are 6 streets.

== Geography ==
Dmitriyevka is located 32 km north of Turochak (the district's administrative centre) by road. Shunarak is the nearest rural locality.
