= Dmitriyevka, Starooskolsky District, Belgorod Oblast =

Dmitriyevka Дмитриевка
- Selo
- Location within Belgorod Oblast Location within Russia
- Coordinates: 51°13′N 38°07′E
- Country: Russia
- Region: Belgorod Oblast
- District: Starooskolsky District
- Time zone: UTC+3:00

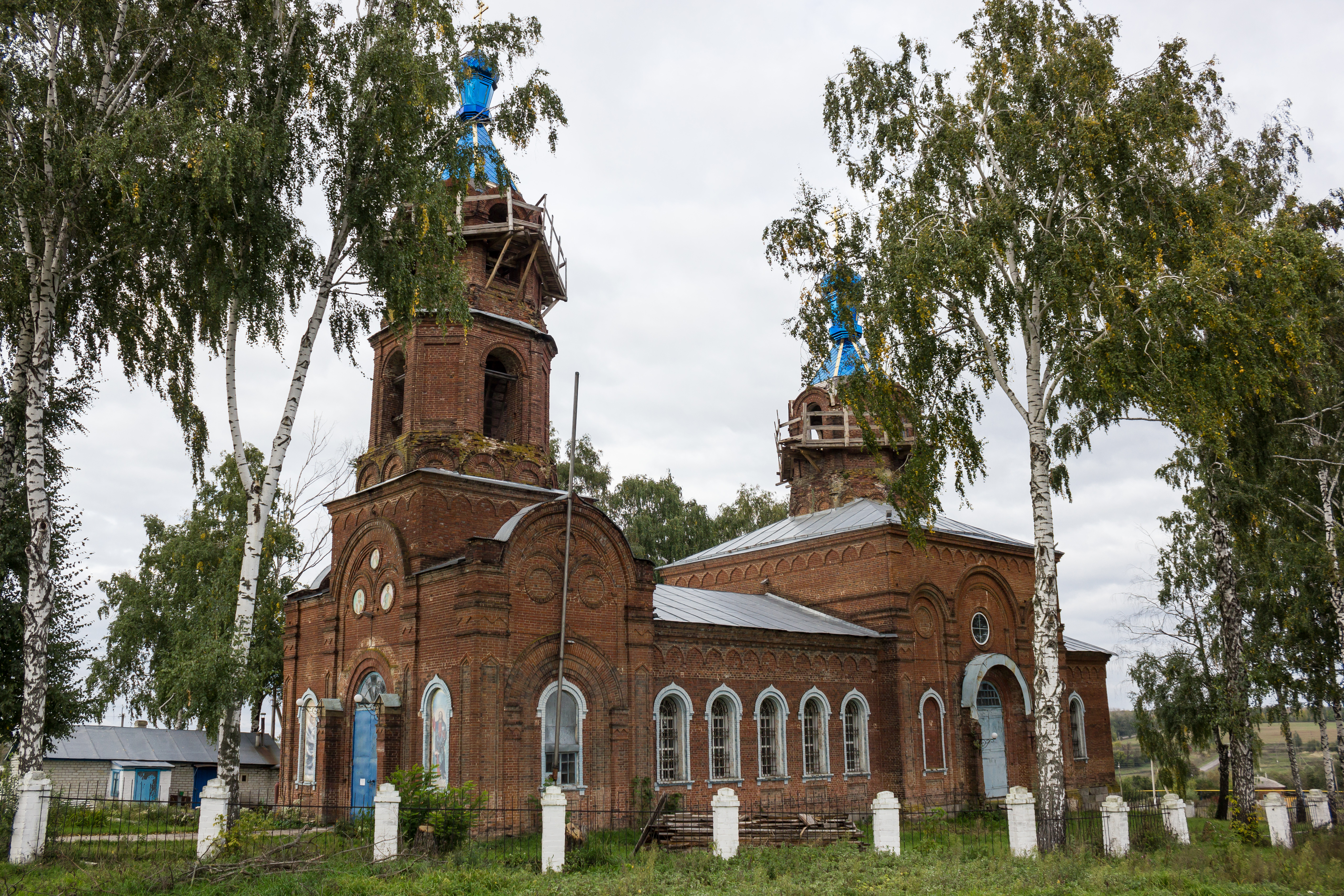
Dmitriyevskaya Church in the village of Dmitriyevka

Dmitriyevka (Russian: Дмитриевка) is a rural locality (a selo) in Starooskolsky District, Belgorod Oblast, Russia. The population was 719 as of 2010. There are 19 streets.

== Geography ==
Dmitriyevka is located 27 km southeast of Stary Oskol (the district's administrative centre) by road. Chuzhikovo is the nearest rural locality.
