= Dmitriyevka, Gribanovsky District, Voronezh Oblast =

Dmitriyevka Дмитриевка
- Selo
- Location within Voronezh Oblast Location within Russia
- Coordinates: 51°28′N 41°36′E
- Country: Russia
- Region: Voronezh Oblast
- District: Gribanovsky District
- Time zone: UTC+3:00

Dmitriyevka (Russian: Дми́триевка) is a rural locality (a selo) in Kalinovskoye Rural Settlement, Gribanovsky District, Voronezh Oblast, Russia. The population was 96 as of 2010. There are 2 streets.

== Geography ==
Dmitriyevka is located 34 km west of Gribanovsky (the district's administrative centre) by road. Kalinovo is the nearest rural locality.
