= Dmitriyevka, Svobodnensky District, Amur Oblast =

Dmitriyevka Дмитриевка
- Selo
- Location within Amur Oblast Location within Russia
- Coordinates: 51°29′N 128°08′E
- Country: Russia
- Region: Amur Oblast
- District: Svobodnensky District
- Time zone: UTC+9:00

Dmitriyevka (Russian: Дмитриевка) is a rural locality (a selo) and the administrative center of Dmitriyevsky Selsoviet of Svobodnensky District, Amur Oblast, Russia. The population was 387 as of 2018. There are 5 streets.

== Geography ==
Dmitriyevka is located on the right bank of the Bolshaya Pera River, 17 km north of Svobodny (the district's administrative centre) by road. Yukhta is the nearest rural locality.
