= Dmitriyevka, Mrakovsky Selsoviet, Gafuriysky District, Republic of Bashkortostan =

Dmitriyevka Дмитриевка
- Village
- Location within Bashkortostan Location within Russia
- Coordinates: 53°47′N 56°09′E
- Country: Russia
- Region: Bashkortostan
- District: Gafuriysky District
- Time zone: UTC+5:00

Dmitriyevka (Russian: Дмитриевка) is a rural locality (a village) in Mrakovsky Selsoviet, Gafuriysky District, Bashkortostan, Russia. The population was 67 as of 2010.

== Geography ==
It is located 31 km from Krasnousolsky and 3 km from Mrakovo.
