= Dmitriyevka, Khokholsky District, Voronezh Oblast =

Dmitriyevka Дмитриевка
- Selo
- Location within Voronezh Oblast Location within Russia
- Coordinates: 51°30′N 38°56′E
- Country: Russia
- Region: Voronezh Oblast
- District: Khokholsky District
- Time zone: UTC+3:00

Dmitriyevka (Russian: Дмитриевка) is a rural locality (a khutor) in Gremyachenskoye Rural Settlement, Khokholsky District, Voronezh Oblast, Russia. The population was 129 as of 2010. There are 6 streets.

== Geography ==
Dmitriyevka is located on the Yemancha River, 22 km southeast of Khokholsky (the district's administrative centre) by road. Gremyachye is the nearest rural locality.
