= Dmitriyevka, Liskinsky District, Voronezh Oblast =

Dmitriyevka Дмитриевка
- Selo
- Location within Voronezh Oblast Location within Russia
- Coordinates: 51°11′N 39°27′E
- Country: Russia
- Region: Voronezh Oblast
- District: Liskinsky District
- Time zone: UTC+3:00

Dmitriyevka (Russian: Дмитриевка) is a rural locality (a selo) in Pochepskoye Rural Settlement, Liskinsky District, Voronezh Oblast, Russia. The population was 262 as of 2010. There are 3 streets.

== Geography ==
Dmitriyevka is located 29 km north of Liski (the district's administrative centre) by road. Pochepskoye is the nearest rural locality.
