= Dmitriyevka, Blagovarsky District, Republic of Bashkortostan =

Dmitriyevka Дмитриевка
- Village
- Location within Bashkortostan Location within Russia
- Coordinates: 54°43′N 54°34′E
- Country: Russia
- Region: Bashkortostan
- District: Blagovarsky District
- Time zone: UTC+5:00

Dmitriyevka (Russian: Дмитриевка) is a rural locality (a village) and the administrative centre of Dmitriyevsky Selsoviet, Blagovarsky District, Bashkortostan, Russia. The population was 362 as of 2010. There are 6 streets.

== Geography ==
Dmitriyevka is located 48 km west of Yazykovo (the district's administrative centre) by road. Sharbash is the nearest rural locality.
