= Dmitriyevka, Ertilsky District, Voronezh Oblast =

Dmitriyevka Дмитриевка
- Settlement
- Location within Voronezh Oblast Location within Russia
- Coordinates: 51°44′N 40°49′E
- Country: Russia
- Region: Voronezh Oblast
- District: Ertilsky District
- Time zone: UTC+3:00

Dmitriyevka (Russian: Дмитриевка) is a rural locality (a settlement) in Pervoertilskoye Rural Settlement, Ertilsky District, Voronezh Oblast, Russia. The population was 302 as of 2010. There are 4 streets.

== Geography ==
Dmitriyevka is located 10 km south of Ertil (the district's administrative centre) by road. Ertil is the nearest rural locality.
