= Ognyanovo, Pazardzhik Province =

Ognyanovo Огняново
- Village
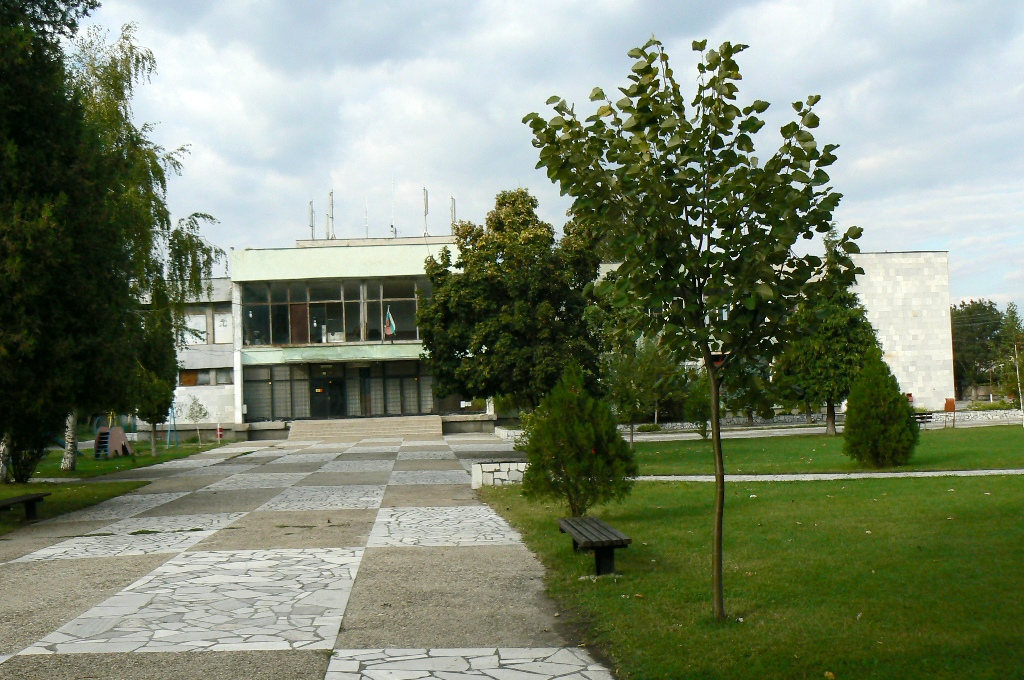
- Ognyanovo town hall

- Location in Bulgaria
- Coordinates: 42°08′58″N 24°24′53″E
- Country: Bulgaria
- Province: Pazardzhik
- Municipality: Pazardzhik

Government
  - Mayor: Mitko Haywood (NMSP)

Area
  - Total: 19,502 km^{2} (7,530 sq mi)
- Elevation: 195 m (640 ft)

Population (2017)
  - Total: 2,472
- Postal code: 4417
- Area code: 03511
- Vehicle registration: РА

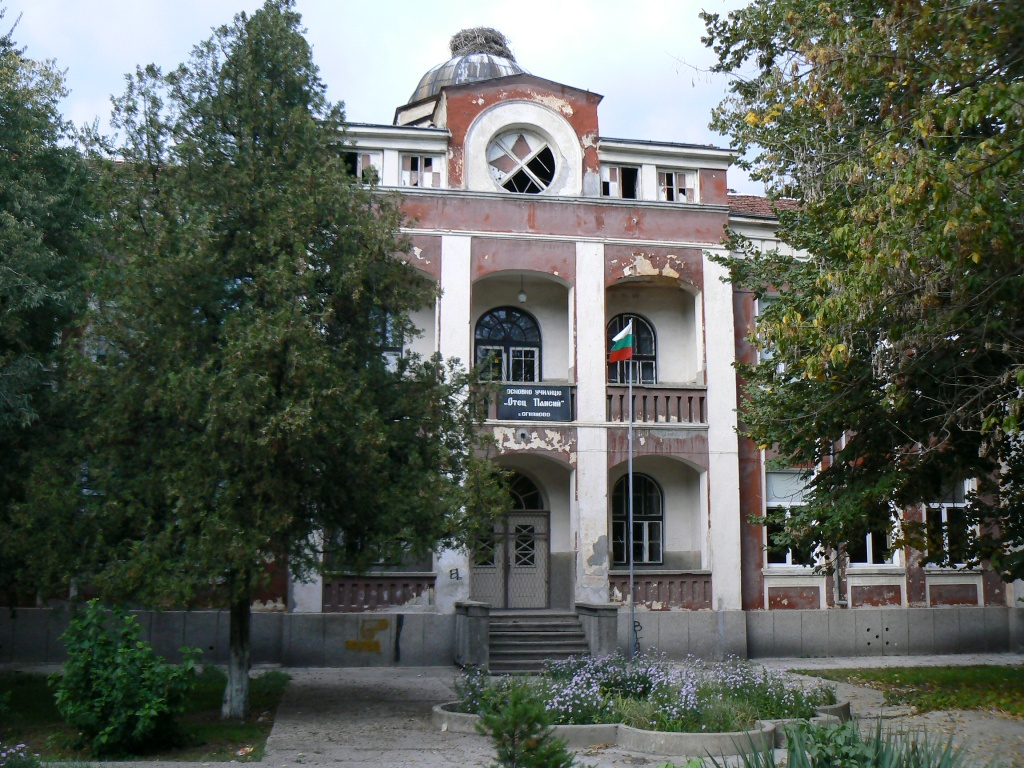
The Paisius of Hilendar Elementary School.

Ognyanovo (Bulgarian: Огняново) is a village in Pazardzhik Municipality, Pazardzhik Province, southern Bulgaria. As of 2006 it has 2,604 inhabitants. The village is situated on the main railway between Sofia and Plovdiv. There is a lime factory.
