= Dmitriyevka, Nordovsky Selsoviet, Meleuzovsky District, Republic of Bashkortostan =

Dmitriyevka Дмитриевка
- Village
- Location within Bashkortostan Location within Russia
- Coordinates: 53°13′N 55°44′E
- Country: Russia
- Region: Bashkortostan
- District: Meleuzovsky District
- Time zone: UTC+5:00

Dmitriyevka (Russian: Дмитриевка) is a rural locality (a village) in Nordovsky Selsoviet, Meleuzovsky District, Bashkortostan, Russia. The population was 356 as of 2010.

== Geography ==
It is located 32 km from Meleuz, 10 km from Nordovka.
