= Dmitriyevka, Rakityansky District, Belgorod Oblast =

Dmitriyevka Дмитриевка
- Selo
- Location within Belgorod Oblast Location within Russia
- Coordinates: 50°46′N 35°59′E
- Country: Russia
- Region: Belgorod Oblast
- District: Rakityansky District
- Time zone: UTC+3:00

Dmitriyevka (Russian: Дмитриевка) is a rural locality (a selo) and the administrative center of Dmitriyevskoye Rural Settlement, Rakityansky District, Belgorod Oblast, Russia. The population was 880 as of 2010. There are 6 streets.

== Geography ==
Dmitriyevka is located 18 km southeast of Rakitnoye (the district's administrative centre) by road. Ivenka is the nearest rural locality.
