= Dmitriyevka, Oktyabrsky District, Kursk Oblast =

Rural locality in Kursk Oblast, Russia

Dmitriyevka Дмитриевка
- Village
- Interactive map of Dmitriyevka
- Location of Dmitriyevka Dmitriyevka (Kursk Oblast)
- Coordinates: 51°46′18″N 35°51′25″E
- Country: Russia
- Federal subject: Kursk Oblast
- Administrative district: Oktyabrsky District
- SelsovietSelsoviet: Starkovsky

Population (2010 Census)
  - Total: 12
  - Estimate (2010): 12 (0%)

Municipal status
  - Municipal district: Oktyabrsky Municipal District
  - Rural settlement: Starkovsky Selsoviet Rural Settlement
- Time zone: UTC+3 (MSK)
- Postal code: 307200
- Dialing code: +7 47142
- OKTMO ID: 38628428126
- Website: starkovo46.ru

Dmitriyevka (Russian: Дмитриевка) is a rural locality (Russian: деревня, lit. 'village') in Starkovsky Selsoviet Rural Settlement, Oktyabrsky District, Kursk Oblast, Russia. Population: 12 (2010 census); 15 (2002 census);

== Geography ==
The village is located on the Sukhaya Rogozna River (a left tributary of the Rogozna in the Seym River basin), 78 km from the Russia–Ukraine border, 19 km north-west of Kursk, 13 km north-west of the district center – the urban-type settlement Pryamitsyno, 1 km from the selsoviet center – Starkovo.

Climate

Dmitriyevka has a warm-summer humid continental climate (Dfb in the Köppen climate classification).

== Transport ==
Dmitriyevka is located 16.5 km from the federal route M-2 Crimea Highway (a part of the European route E105), 13.5 km from the road of regional importance 38K-017 (Kursk – Lgov – Rylsk – border with Ukraine), 0.2 km from the road of intermunicipal significance 38H-073 (Dyakonovo – Starkovo – Sokolovka), 15 km from the nearest railway halt 439 km (railway line Lgov I — Kursk).

The rural locality is situated 29.5 km from Kursk Vostochny Airport, 133 km from Belgorod International Airport and 232 km from Voronezh Peter the Great Airport.
