= Dmitriyevka, Dmitriyevsky Selsoviet, Chishminsky District, Republic of Bashkortostan =

Dmitriyevka Дмитриевка
- Village
- Location within Bashkortostan Location within Russia
- Coordinates: 54°45′N 55°20′E
- Country: Russia
- Region: Bashkortostan
- District: Chishminsky District
- Time zone: UTC+5:00

Dmitriyevka (Russian: Дмитриевка) is a rural locality (a village) and the administrative seat of Dmitriyevsky Selsoviet, Chishminsky District, Bashkortostan, Russia. The population was 277 as of 2010.

== Geography ==
It is located 25 km from Chishmy.
