= Dmitriyevka, Altai Krai =

Dmitriyevka Дмитриевка
- Selo
- Location within Altai Krai Location within Russia
- Coordinates: 53°02′N 80°25′E
- Country: Russia
- Region: Altai Krai
- District: Blagoveshchensky District
- Time zone: UTC+7:00

Dmitriyevka (Russian: Дмитриевка) is a rural locality (a selo) in Lenkovsky Selsoviet, Blagoveshchensky District, Altai Krai, Russia. The population was 94 as of 2013. There is 1 street.

== Geography ==
Dmitriyevka is located 65 km northeast of Blagoveshchenka (the district's administrative centre) by road. Lenki is the nearest rural locality.
