= Dmitriyevka, Dmitriyevsky Settlement Council, Nikiforovsky District, Tambov Oblast =

Dmitriyevka Дмитриевка
- Urban-type settlement
- Interactive map of Dmitriyevka
- Location of Dmitriyevka Dmitriyevka (Tambov Oblast)
- Coordinates: 52.8935°N 40.7835°E
- Country: Russia
- Federal subject: Tambov Oblast
- Administrative district: Nikiforovsky District

Population (2010 Census)
  - Total: 8,421
  - Estimate (2021): 6,888 (−18.2%)
- Time zone: UTC+3 (MSK)
- Postal code: 393000
- OKTMO ID: 68620151051

Dmitriyevka (Russian: Дмитриевка) is an urban locality (an urban-type settlement) in Nikiforovsky District of Tambov Oblast, Russia. Population: 8,421 (2010 census); 9,287 (2002 census); 9,518 (1989 Soviet census).
