= Nova Nadezhda =

- Village
- Location within Bulgaria
- Coordinates: 42°01′N 25°43′E
- Country: Bulgaria
- Province: Haskovo Province
- Municipality: Haskovo
- Time zone: UTC+2 (EET)
  - Summer (DST): UTC+3 (EEST)

Nova Nadezhda is a village in the municipality of Haskovo, in Haskovo Province, in southern Bulgaria.
