= Novopostoyalovka =

Novopostoyalovka Новопостояловка
- Khutor
- Location within Voronezh Oblast Location within Russia
- Coordinates: 50°20′N 39°27′E
- Country: Russia
- Region: Voronezh Oblast
- District: Rossoshansky District
- Time zone: UTC+3:00

Novopostoyalovka (Russian: Новопостояловка) is a rural locality (a khutor) in Novopostoyalovskoye Rural Settlement, Rossoshansky District, Voronezh Oblast, Russia. The population was 261 as of 2010. There are 2 streets. Between January 19 and 20, 1943, Italian Alpini attacked the village, leading to the Battle of Novopostoyalovka, one of the fiercest and costliest battles fought by the Royal Italian Army during the war.

== Geography ==
Novopostoyalovka is located 21 km northwest of Rossosh (the district's administrative centre) by road. Drozdovo is the nearest rural locality. Novopostoyalovka is located on the federal highway P194 in the northwestern part of the district, near the border with the Olkhovatsky District.

There are 2 streets: Leninskaya and Sadovaya.

== History ==
In the middle of the XVIII century, on the road from Ostrogozhsk to Rossosh (further on to Azov), an inn arose, near which the village of Postoyaly grew up. In 1835, 10 km south along the same road, another inn appeared, near which a farm also grew, called Novopostoyaly. Merchants stopped here to change horses, eat, and rest. There was also a tavern at this place, which gave another name to the settlement. Until 1934, Novopostoyalovka was part of the Central Black Earth Oblast.

== The battle of Novopostoyalovka ==
Battle of Novopostoyalovka
- Part of Eastern Front of the Second World War
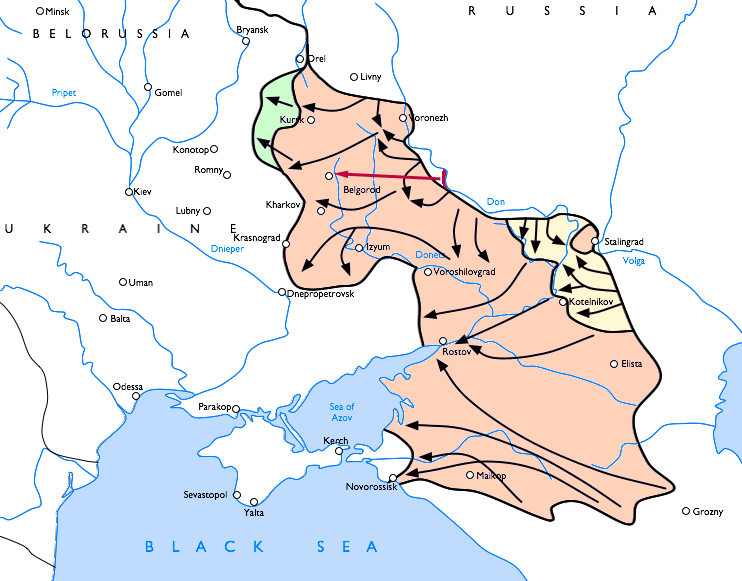
- The Alpini positions on the river Don before the Soviet advances during operations Uranus, Mars and Saturn and their line of retreat in red.
Date	19 January 1943 – 20 January 1943
Location	Novopostoyalovka, Voronezh Oblast, Russia 50°20′N 39°27′E
Result	Soviet victory

Belligerents
Soviet Union	Italy

Commanders and leaders
	(Kingdom of Italy) Emilio Battisti (POW) (Kingdom of Italy) Umberto Ricagno (POW)

Units involved
(Soviet Union) 6th Army (Soviet Union) 3rd Tank Army	(Kingdom of Italy) 4th Alpine Division "Cuneense" (Kingdom of Italy) 3rd Alpine Division "Julia"

Casualties and losses
Unknown	Very high

=== Background ===
In the winter of 1942/43, the Red Army launched several large offensives on the southern part of the Eastern Front in the wake of the Battle of Stalingrad. In late December, at the same time as the German 6th Army was increasingly enclosed in Stalingrad by the troops of Konstantin Rokossovsky, the troops of the Southwestern Front attacked the Italian 8th Army stationed on the Don river as part of the Operation Little Saturn. In the first stage of the offensive, the Soviets attacked and encircled the Italian Army in Russia's II Army Corps and XXXV Army Corps.

On 13 January 1943, the Red Army launched the second stage of Operation Little Saturn: four armies of General Filipp Golikov's Voronezh Front attacked, encircled, and destroyed the Hungarian Second Army near Svoboda on the Don to the northwest of the Alpine Army Corps and pushed back the remaining units of the German XXIV Army Corps on the Alpine Army Corps' left flank, thus encircling the Alpine Army Corps. The Alpini held the front on the Don, but within three days the Soviets had advanced 200 km to the left and right of the Alpini.

The Soviets had a crushing superiority in men and weapons: men and artillery were outnumbered six-to-one. The Russians deployed against the Italians 754 T-34 tanks supported by 810 guns and 1,255 mortars, 300 anti-tank guns and 200 Katyusha rocket launchers. To fight them off, the Italians had only 47 tanks, 132 guns, 108 mortars and 114 anti-tank guns.

=== Prelude ===
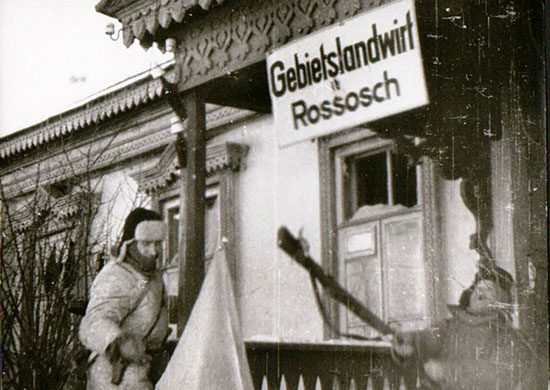
Russian soldiers in Rossosh in January 1943

On January 16, the Red Army occupied Rossosh, seat of the Alpine Corps headquarters. On the evening of 17 January, the Alpine Army Corps commander, General Gabriele Nasci, ordered a full retreat. By then it was too late; the circle was closing around the Italian Alpini divisions, and they would have to fight their way out.

The three Alpine divisions "Tridentina", "Julia" and "Cuneense", the 156th Infantry Division "Vicenza", the German XXIV Army Corps, and all troops and service units posted in the Rossosh zone were to move toward the alignment Valuyki–Rovenki as quickly as possible. Furthermore, the orders stated that once the troops so deployed, a new defensive line would be drawn, fortified by German troops arriving in that zone. The Tridentina and the XXIV German Army Corps were given the order to withdraw in the direction of Podgornoye-Opyt. The Cuneense and Vicenza divisions were to head towards Popovka, the Julia north of Rossosh.

On January 17, the 4th Alpine Division "Cuneense" began to withdraw. The routes assigned for the "Julia" and "Cuneense" divisions crossed with around 10,000 German and Hungarian stragglers, which inevitably led to jams, chaos, and friction between the various formations. During the night of January 17, the rearguard of the "Cuneense" was attacked by Soviet partisans, but the "Saluzzo" Battalion managed to repel them, inflicting heavy casualties.

=== Battle ===
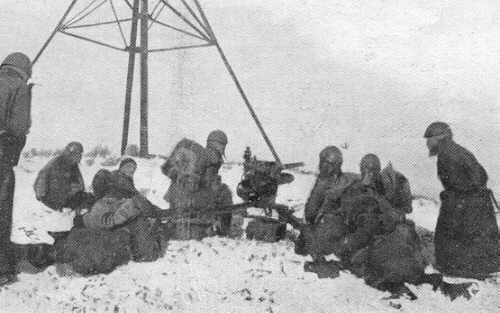
Italian soldiers with a Breda 38 machine gun on the Russian Front, 1943

On January 19, General Emilio Battisti, commander of the "Cuneense", held a meeting with Generalleutnant Karl Eibl, commander of the 385th Infantry Division. They determined to abandon the direction of withdrawal assigned to them and instead to head towards Valuyki, which was considered not yet in enemy hands. Around 7 pm, Russian units attacked the 72nd Battery of the "Val Po" Group, causing serious losses. The 21st Battery of the "Saluzzo" Battalion was completely destroyed. Its sacrifice allowed the column to disengage and continue its retreat towards Valuyki. On January 20, the "Cuneense" division encountered some units of the Julia blocked by the Russians near the village of Novopostoyalovka. The "Ceva" and the "Mondovì" battalions were ordered to attack the village. The batteries of the "Mondovì" were destroyed by Soviet T-34 tanks and the "Ceva" Battalion suffered heavy losses. The Soviets demanded surrender, but General Battisti refused. He ordered the commander of the 2nd Alpini Regiment to launch an attack with the "Saluzzo" and "Borgo San Dalmazzo" battalions. The two battalions nearly succeeded in their intent, i.e. crossing a ridge between two small villages north of Novopostoyalovka, but the Russians counterattacked violently with infantry troops and numerous tanks, inflicting heavy losses on both. Dead and mortally wounded Alpini amounted to 1,500. The commander of the "Mondovì" Battalion, Major Mario Trovato, and that of the "Ceva", Lieutenant colonel Giuseppe Avenanti died heroically in the battle. General Battisti realised it was impossible to force the ridge without anti-tank weapons, but still hoped he could escape Soviet encirclement. The "Cuneense" units began to abandon their positions at Novopostoyalovka, but Soviet cavalry consisting of Siberian troops (at home in both snow and ice) renewed the attack on the remnants of the "Mondovì" Battalion, in charge of protecting the retreat and the flank of the column. The "Mondovì" was completely destroyed. Meanwhile the Russians attacked from behind the remnants of the 2nd Alpini Regiment, retreating from the village of Kopanki, southeast of Novopostoyalovka.

Upon leaving the zone of Novopostoyalovka, survivors of the "Cuneense" and "Julia" divisions marched northwest in two columns throughout the night of January 20. They managed to reach Postoyaly, and at 8 pm they arrived in the village of Alexsandrovka, west of Postoyaly, where there was still a small German garrison.

=== Aftermath ===
On January 21, Italo Gariboldi, commander of the Italian 8th Army, warned General Nasci that Valuyki had fallen to the Russians and ordered him to head twenty kilometers further north to Nikolayevka (now Livenka, Belgorod Oblast, in Russia). However, this report never reached the surviving units of the Julia and the "Cuneense" divisions, which continued to fight rearguard battles on the left flank of the "Tridentina".

On the morning of January 22, the Cuneense set off again to march towards Novokharkovka; in the evening of the same day they reached the first houses of the village. At dawn January 23, the "Cuneense" resumed its march, but at 2 pm three Russian tanks suddenly appeared and attacked the head of the column. A German mortar disabled one tank; the other two withdrew back toward the village of Krawzowka. The march resumed, ending in the evening in the town of Nowo Dimitriewka. General Battisti now asked for the maximum effort from his men, telling them that the longer they marched then the higher the likelihood for them to save themselves. At midnight General Battisti gathered his remaining officers together to ask them if they wanted to proceed marching as a united group under his command, or if they preferred to try and get out of the encirclement in small groups. All officers said that they wanted to continue the withdrawal as a united group under his command.

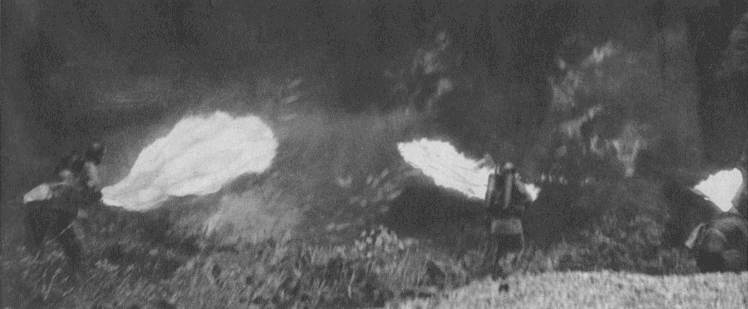
Italian troops use Model 40 flamethrowers to attack a Soviet bunker in 1943

At 2 am on January 24, they headed off on the march again in two columns. Around 6 pm, the two columns of Alpini headed south in order to cross the valley of the Chyornaya Kalitva. At a certain point, a German plane landed close to the marching column. A German officer approached Battisti saying he had orders to take him out of the encirclement. Battisti refused, stating that he wanted to share the fate of his Alpini. He sent two wounded men to fly out of the area in his place. Between dawn and 8 am of January 25, the two columns gathered together one at Rybalkin the other at Dechtjarna. In the latter location Russian tanks and heavy artillery opened a violent fire, inflicting heavy losses. The march resumed, and towards noon what remained of the column joined the other in Rybalkin. At twilight January 25, what remained of the "Cuneense" and "Julia" divisions prepared to march on. Then a violent storm erupted with tremendous winds and snowfall. The column now crawled along at 200 m per hour. At dawn on January 26, the storm ceased, and the Alpini resumed their march in one column, in direction of Valuyki. The "Cuneense" was now in sight of Schukowo. From the village heavy mortar and machine gun fire erupted. The "Dronero" Battalion led a bayonet charge and forced the Russians to retreat. The march resumed until evening without any disturbance. Having arrived near Malakeyevo, the column was hit by heavy artillery fire and split again into two. One column stopped at Malakeyevo and the other at Solontsy.

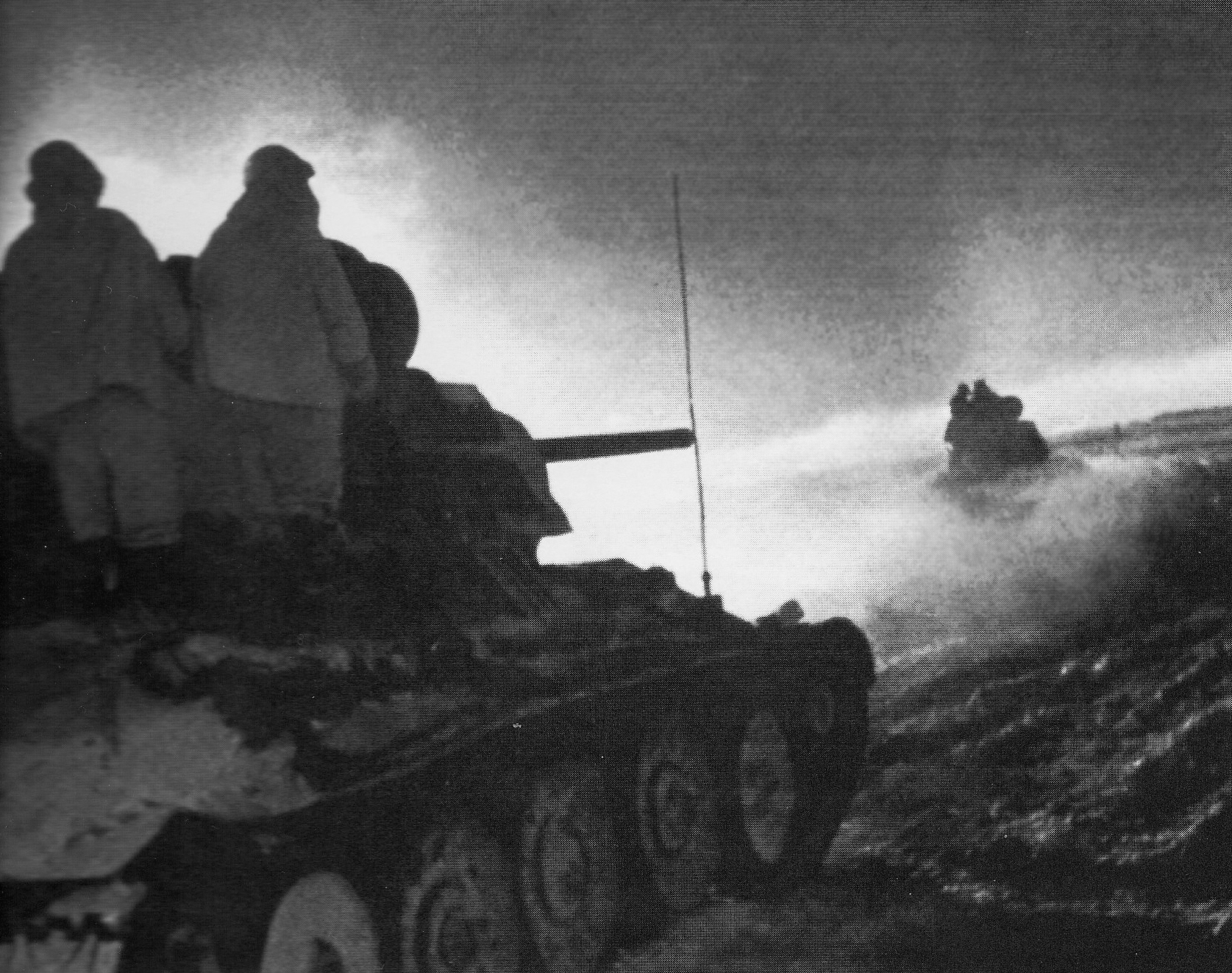
Column of soviet tanks (Operation Little Saturn, december 1942)

At dawn on January 27, the two columns formed up, joining up in the outskirts of the village of Voronovka, were the Russians awaited them. Large squads of Cossacks sporting machine guns loaded on sleds attacked the head of the column. The Soviets offered surrender terms, but General Battisti replied with a stern refusal. The "Dronero" Battalion rallied for combat again forcing the enemy to retreat.

At the break of dawn, January 28, the "Cuneense" was worn out. The division had walked 250 km, fought 20 battles, lost 80% of its men and more than 50% of its artillery and spent 11 nights camped out in the middle of the Russian Steppe. Temperatures during the nights were between -30 °C and -40 °C. As soon as the Cuneense reached Valuyki a ferocious artillery barrage blasted those that remained. A squad of Cossacks arriving from the north galloped along the bottom of the valley toward the column. The Alpini mistook them for friendly Hungarian cavalry, and ran towards them. The Russians surrounded them and launched their final attack. The Italians now had no ammunition left and were so desperate that they engaged in hand-to-hand fighting. The last surviving officers of the "Cuneense" were captured around the outskirts of Valuyki in the morning of January 28. In the afternoon the last Alpini from "Borgo San Dalmazzo", "Saluzzo" and "Mondovì" battalions were captured. In the evening of that tragic day, even the "Mondovì" Battalion laid down its arms.

Only 1,600 men out of 17,000 were able to escape the encirclement. Thousands who survived the Soviet onslaught were taken prisoner and died on the so-called davai marches - named for Russian guards' command to keep prisoners moving - or later in prisoner-of-war camps. General Battisti was initially held in a Soviet prison, where he was for some time a cellmate of German Field Marshal Friedrich Paulus, and then in a prisoner-of-war camp, for over seven years; he was only released in 1950, returning to Italy on May 15 of that year, along with Generals Umberto Ricagno and Etelvoldo Pascolini and thirty South Tyrolean SS soldiers.

== Bibliography ==
- Massignani, Alessandro (1991). Alpini e Tedeschi sul Don (in Italian). Novale-Valdagno (Vicenza): Edizioni Gino Rossato.
- Hamilton, Hope (2011). Sacrifice on the Steppe: The Italian Alpine Corps in the Stalingrad Campaign, 1942-1943. Casemate. p. 140. ISBN 9781612000022.
- Ferraris, Giorgio (2013). In prima linea a Nowo Postojalowka. La campagna di Russia di Giacomo Alberti alpino della Cuneense. Araba Fenice. ISBN 9788866171805.
- Thomas Schlemmer, ed. (2005). Die Italiener an der Ostfront 1942/43: Dokumente zu Mussolinis Krieg gegen die Sowjetunion (in German). München: Oldenbourg. doi:10.1524/9783486702842. ISBN 3-486-57847-2.
- Morozov, W. P. (1959). Westlich von Woronesh: Kurzer militärischer Abriß der Angriffsoperationen der sowjetischen Truppen in der Zeit von Januar bis Februar 1943 (in German). Verlag des Ministeriums für Nationale Verteidigung.
