= 219th Rifle Division =

219th Motorized Division (March 11, 1941 - September 9, 1941) 219th Rifle Division (September 9, 1941 - November 16, 1941) 219th Rifle Division (January 14, 1942 - July 1945)
- Active: 1941–1945
- Country: Soviet Union
- Branch: Red Army
- Type: Infantry
- Role: Motorized Infantry
- Size: Division
- Engagements: Operation Barbarossa; Battle of Kiev (1941); Case Blue; Operation Little Saturn; Ostrogozhsk–Rossosh offensive Voronezh–Kastornoye offensive Battle of Kursk; Battle of Nevel (1943); Polotsk–Vitebsk Offensive; Rezhitsa–Dvinsk Offensive; Baltic offensive Riga offensive (1944); Courland Pocket
- Decorations: Order of the Red Banner (2nd formation)
- Battle honours: Idritsa (2nd formation)

Commanders
- Notable commanders: Maj. Gen. Pavel Petrovich Korzun; Col. Vasilii Nikolaevich Varichev; Maj. Gen. Vasilii Petrovich Kotelnikov; Col. Vasilii Grigorevich Kovalenko

The 219th Rifle Division was formed as an infantry division of the Red Army after a motorized division of that same number was redesignated about 10 weeks after the start of the German invasion of the Soviet Union. Due to a chronic lack of vehicles, and especially tanks, the division had been effectively serving as a motorized rifle brigade since June 22, so the redesignation was a formality and it was soon destroyed in the encirclement battle east of Kiev.

A new 219th was formed in January 1942, based on the 441st Rifle Division and the rifle division shtat (table of organization and equipment) of December 6, 1941. It spent several months forming in the Reserve of the Supreme High Command before it was sent to the active front as part of 6th Army near Voronezh. During the Ostrogozhsk–Rossosh Offensive in January 1943 it took part in the destruction of the 2nd Hungarian Army and was soon after moved to the Kursk region and defended the south face of the salient as part of 40th Army. It then moved north to join Kalinin Front and fought through the winter in the battles west of Nevel. After the summer offensive in 1944 began it was granted a battle honor and within weeks the Order of the Red Banner as well. The 219th fought through Latvia and in early 1945 was part of 22nd Army containing the Courland Pocket. Before the German surrender it was moved south to the Odessa area where it was disbanded later in the year.

== 219th Motorized Division ==
The division began forming in March 1941, as part of the prewar buildup of Soviet mechanized forces at Akhtyrka in the Kharkov Military District as part of the 25th Mechanized Corps. Once formed its order of battle was as follows:

- 710th Motorized Rifle Regiment
- 727th Motorized Rifle Regiment
- 136th Tank Regiment (until August 24, 1941)
- 673rd Artillery Regiment
- 45th Antitank Battalion
- 232nd Antiaircraft Battalion
- 287th Reconnaissance Battalion
- 382nd Light Engineering Battalion
- 592nd Signal Battalion
- 217th Artillery Park Battalion
- 374th Medical/Sanitation Battalion
- 696th Motor Transport Battalion
- 165th Repair and Restoration Battalion
- 57th Regulatory Company
- 476th Chemical Defense (Anti-gas) Company
- 219th Divisional Artillery Park
- 692nd Field Postal Station
- 518th Field Office of the State Bank

Maj. Gen. Pavel Petrovich Korzun was appointed to command on March 11. This officer had previously commanded the 9th Cavalry Division before serving for over a year as an instructor at the Frunze Military Academy. The division may have had a few tanks assigned to it by the start of the German invasion as there were some 300 on strength with 25th Corps. Maj. Gen. S. M. Krivoshein, the Corps commander, quickly grouped all his tanks in the tank divisions of the Corps, leaving the 219th as, effectively, a reinforced motorized rifle brigade. Along with the rest of the Corps it was chronically short of artillery, antiaircraft guns and trucks.

On June 22 the 25th Corps (50th and 55th Tank Divisions, 219th Motorized, 12th Motorcycle Regiment) was assigned to 21st Army in the Reserve of the Supreme High Command. By July 10 the Army had come under the command of Western Front and was concentrating in the area of Zhlobin. The Front commander, Marshal S. K. Timoshenko, had ordered an extensive counteroffensive against the advance of Army Group Center but only 21st Army, on the Front's left (south) flank, achieved any success. At 0241 hours on July 13 the Army commander, Col. Gen. F. I. Kuznetsov, ordered his forces to expand the offensive against the right flank of 2nd Panzer Group in the Bykhaw area while recapturing Babruysk and Parichi. The 219th was to concentrate in the Rudnia, Borkhov and Pribor region, 15-25km west of Gomel, while 50th Tanks prepared to attack on the Bykhaw and Babruysk axis.

In Western Front's operational summary of 2000 hours on July 18 the 21st Army was reported as attacking toward Babruysk against four German divisions while the 219th was concentrating in the Chachersk and Voronovka region 60km east-southeast of Rahachow. On July 22 Kuznetsov issued further orders to 25th Mechanized Corps to retake Propoisk and cut the German supply route between that place and Krychaw. The division tried but failed to capture Malyi Propoisk (10km south of Propoisk) in the face of arriving reinforcements. The next day it was transferred to 4th Army and, along with 28th Rifle Corps and part of 20th Rifle Corps seized the northeast outskirts of Propoisk. By July 26 this effort was suspended and the Army went over to the defensive.

By the beginning of August the 219th had returned to 21st Army which was now part of the newly-formed Central Front. Later that month it was being referred to as a rifle division in official communications, although it had not yet been redesignated. During the previous weeks it was assigned to 28th Corps, which had joined 21st Army, and had retreated to the south under attack by the German XXXXIII Army Corps, reaching the line of the Seym River by August 11. On August 27 the new commander of the Army, Lt. Gen. V. I. Kuznetsov, reported that the 219th was located at Gorodok and Senkovka, 70-75km northeast of Chernihiv. Central Front had been disbanded on August 25 and 21st Army was now under command of Bryansk Front. The situation facing the Army was rapidly deteriorating as the XXIV Motorized Corps had inserted itself in the gap between it and the Front's main forces along the Desna. General Kuznetsov reported on August 29 that 28th Corps was defending along a line from Gutka Studenetskaya through Elino to Novye Borovichi; together with 66th Rifle Corps it was attempting to hold a 100km-wide line with a handful of battered rifle divisions. Despite this, over the following days the STAVKA continued to issue attack orders to the Front which were doomed to failure. Early on August 30 the 219th was reported as holding along part of its sector but having been pushed back to Sinkovka on the 28th.

=== 1st Formation ===
By this time the 2nd Panzer Group had begun its drive to the south to link up with 1st Panzer Group and encircle Southwestern Front east of Kiev. 28th Corps continued defending along the Snov River on August 30 and appears to have eliminated a German force that had infiltrated its positions on September 1 but this was of little relevance to the overall situation. During September 4 the 219th was defending from Tikhonovichi to Lazovka east of Snovsk. Kuznetsov ordered his Army to withdraw across the Desna at 1300 hours on September 5. The division was reinforced with the 375th Reserve Rifle Regiment to replace the 136th Tank Regiment on September 9, and was officially redesignated as the 219th Rifle Division but this made no substantial difference to its position since the two panzer groups met at Lokhvytsia on September 16. Most of 21st Army was pocketed, including the 219th, and it was destroyed by the end of the month although it officially remained in the Red Army order of battle until November 16. General Korzun escaped the encirclement and went on to be promoted to the rank of lieutenant general and command the 3rd and 47th Armies before being killed in action on September 16, 1943.

== 2nd Formation ==
The 441st Rifle Division began forming in December 1941 at Kirsanov in the South Ural Military District. On January 14, 1942 it was redesignated as the 2nd formation of the 219th. When it completed forming it had an order of battle similar to the 219th Motorized and the 1st formation:

- 375th Rifle Regiment
- 710th Rifle Regiment
- 727th Rifle Regiment
- 673rd Artillery Regiment
- 45th Antitank Battalion
- 136th Mortar Battalion (until October 10, 1942)
- Separate Machine Gun Battalion (from July 9, 1942 to May 1, 1943)
- 488th Reconnaissance Company
- 382nd Sapper Battalion
- 592nd Signal Battalion (later 670th Signal Company)
- 374th Medical/Sanitation Battalion
- 88th Chemical Defense (Anti-gas) Company
- 77th Motor Transport Battalion
- 454th Field Bakery
- 919th Divisional Veterinary Hospital
- 1683rd Field Postal Station
- 1096th Field Office of the State Bank

The division was under the command of Col. Vasilii Nikolaevich Varichev until April 23 when Maj. Gen. Vasilii Petrovich Kotelnikov took over. This officer had previously served as commander of the 3rd Leningrad Militia (Opolcheniye) Division. In May it was assigned to the 3rd Reserve Army in the Reserve of the Supreme High Command until June when it was moved to the 6th Reserve Army, which joined the active front on July 9 as the 3rd formation of the 6th Army, assigned to Bryansk Front. The Army was deployed along the Don River south of Voronezh. As of the beginning of August the Army had been moved to Voronezh Front.

== Operation Little Saturn ==
The situation around Voronezh soon became a stalemate as the German mobile forces were required to push eastward toward Stalingrad. At the start of December, after the German 6th Army had been encircled at that city, the 219th was still under the same commands in much the same area along the Don. The planning for Operation Saturn, which had begun in late November, had included the Soviet 6th Army of Voronezh Front operating jointly with Southwestern Front to penetrate the defenses of the Italian 8th Army, reach the Kantemirovka region, and protect the right flank of that Front's forces. 6th Army now contained five rifle divisions, including the 219th, two tank corps plus a tank brigade and two tank regiments, one tank destroyer brigade, the 8th Artillery Division and additional artillery assets, and was supported by the entire 2nd Air Army. As the situation evolved during early December, particularly with the commitment of 2nd Guards Army to counter the German attempt to relieve the Stalingrad pocket, Operation Saturn became Operation Little Saturn, but the role of 6th Army remained much the same.

The offensive began at dawn on December 16 with a massive artillery bombardment and strikes by several hundred aircraft. The main attack was carried out by 1st and 3rd Guards Armies against the Italian 8th and the German Army Detachment Hollidt, which was defending along the Krivaya and the upper Chir Rivers. 6th Army, which had been reinforced, was on the right flank facing four divisions of the Italian II Army Corps across the frozen Don and was to advance in the direction of Kantemirovka led by its 15th Rifle Corps and 17th Tank Corps. The 219th, under direct Army command, was assigned a supporting role. The attacks on the first day were frustrated by heavy fog and effective Italian resistance; after an overnight regrouping that integrated armor into the infantry formations the resistance was largely crushed on the 17th and turned into a rout. The next day the Italian infantry, overrun by up to 800 tanks, effectively disintegrated and a headlong exploitation began. By the end of December 31, 6th Army had been transferred to Southwestern Front and was facing the Italian Alpini Corps, with remnants of 8th Army, across a roughly 60km-wide front from Novaya Kalitva southward to west of Kantemirovka.

=== Ostrogozhsk–Rossosh Offensive ===
After regrouping its southern forces in the first days of 1943 the STAVKA was determined to defeat the Axis forces (primarily the 2nd Hungarian Army and remnants of Italian 8th Army) operating along the Voronezh–Kursk and Kharkov axes. The first task was to crush the forces defending the area of Ostrogozhsk and Rossosh, which would primarily involve forces of Voronezh Front. By the start of the new year the 219th had been assigned to the 18th Rifle Corps, which also contained the 161st, 270th and 309th Rifle Divisions plus the 10th Ski Brigade and was directly under Voronezh Front command. The Front commander, Lt. Gen. F. I. Golikov, created three shock groupings for the offensive: a northern group consisting of 40th Army, a southern group based on 3rd Tank Army, and 18th Corps as a central group, which was to step off from the Shchuche bridgehead over the Don and link up with the two Armies by the fourth day in the areas of Ostrogozhsk and Kamenka. The 219th was in the Corps' first echelon. The offensive was to begin with probing attacks on January 12 followed by the main effort the following day. On the second day the division was to advance with the 96th Tank Brigade in the direction of Yekaterinovka and Saguny and by the fourth day was to capture Dankovskii and Lykovo, covering an average of about 12km each day.

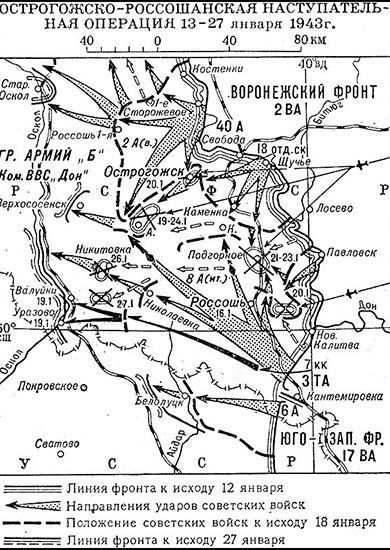
Ostrogozhsk–Rossosh Offensive

The attack's artillery preparation, which began at 0830 hours, continued for two hours and took the Axis forces by surprise, causing heavy losses in men and equipment and disorganization of command and control. Airstrikes also damaged defensive strongpoints. The infantry assault began at 1030, supported by the KV tanks of 262nd Guards Tank Regiment and units of 96th Tank Brigade. The 219th, on the Corps' right flank, had difficulty with its first objective, Hill 175.4. Attacking from the northeast and east it had to cover considerable open ground between its jumping-off positions and the first trench line. In addition the height's slopes were ice-covered and many of the fortifications, including barbed wire and firing points, had escaped the artillery preparation. The defending Hungarian 48th Infantry Regiment continued to resist even after the rest of its 12th Infantry Division had been broken through. The 309th Division on the 219th's right had made a successful penetration, but General Kotelnikov was later faulted for failing to regroup his forces into or toward this sector to outflank the height, and the commander of 18th Corps, Maj. Gen. P. M. Zykov, likewise failed to take appropriate action. As a result the division was pinned down in front of the height and suffered unjustified losses. It fell to Golikov to order the Corps to develop the success of the 309th and the 129th Rifle Brigade and to direct the 219th to be pulled back to the southern outskirts of Shchuche, put back in order, and then be committed through the 309th's sector in the direction of Yekaterinovka in order to get into the rear of the 19th Hungarian Division. By 1400 this regrouping was complete and it began to attack on the new axis.

Upon coming into contact the 219th was counterattacked by a battalion of the 12th Infantry from the direction of the 8th of March Collective Farm; this battalion came under fire from a battalion of Guards mortars and was almost completely destroyed, with some 60 survivors falling back in disorder to the south. The commander of the 48th Infantry Regiment, becoming aware that elements of the 219th were appearing in his rear, ordered a withdrawal to the south in the direction of the sheep farm and the Ilich's Testament Collective Farm. At the same time the training battalion of the 309th cut the Regiment's path of retreat and it soon laid down its arms. The 219th now advanced to the southwest and by the end of the day had reached a line from the sheep farm to outside the 8th of March Farm, while the 309th's training battalion occupied Hill 175.4.

Zykov ordered the Corps to continue fighting through the night and also moved up his reserve 161st Division and 192nd Tank Brigade for commitment in the morning on the boundary between the 309th and 219th. Overnight, while the temperature dropped to -25 degrees C with strong winds, the 219th reached a line between the two collective farms, for an overall advance during the first 24 hours of up to 12km. During the same period the 40th and 3rd Tank Armies had penetrated the Axis front to the north and south, beginning the encirclement of the Ostrogozhsk–Rossosh group of forces. During January 15 the 219th pivoted its attack to the south, toward Marki and Saguny, rolling up the defenses of the 19th and 23rd Infantry Divisions along the right bank of the Don. By 1500 hours it had liberated Yekaterinovka and by the end of the day had reached a line from height 198 to Svoboda against stiff resistance recording an advance 6km. Attempts to seize Marki that night were unsuccessful.

As the offensive developed the task of 18th Corps was to break up the defending grouping as it was enveloped by the other two shock groups. In fact the Corps' attack attracted many of the available reserves, including the German 26th Infantry Division. In the morning of January 17 the 219th overcame the resistance in the Marki area and by day's end had reached a line from Vyselki to Yudino; the next day it occupied Saguny as it advanced toward Karpenkovo to establish a linkup with 3rd Tank Army, having advanced another 12km. Meanwhile that Army's 12th Tank Corps was involved in bitter fighting with units of 26th Infantry which were falling back to the latter place. The linkup at Karpenkovo and Alekseevka effectively completed the encirclement and splitting of the Axis group of forces. A total of about 13 Hungarian, German and Italian divisions (or remnants thereof) were trapped, although the shortage of rifle divisions meant that each was holding an average sector of 20km.

During January 19-27 the encircled forces in the Rossosh area were gradually eliminated. The 219th took up the pursuit to the southwest from its previous line with the task of reaching the line Stepanovka–northern part of Podgornoye by the end of the day, an advance of 20km on an 8km-wide frontage. It was also to leave behind one reinforced rifle company in each of Saguny station, Goncharovka and Podgornoye to cut the Axis lines of retreat. This advance succeeded and by the end of the day most of the Italian 3rd and 4th Alpini Divisions and the German 385th and 387th Infantry Divisions had been destroyed or captured in the pocket, although individual groups managed to break out to the north. By the end of the 20th the pocket had shrunk to about 150 sq. km. but the trapped forces continued to offer resistance and made attempts to escape.

General Golikov issued orders on January 21 to regroup his forces for the upcoming Voronezh–Kastornoye offensive, which included the movement of 18th Corps to the Oskol River. This led to running battles between shifting Soviet units and disorganized Axis groups, especially in the Podgornoye area, over the next two days. On January 23 the leading regiment of the 219th and elements of the 37th Rifle Brigade reinforced the 15th Tank Corps and occupied Ilyinka, blocking the last escape route of the German 26th and 168th Infantry and Hungarian 1st Armored Field Division. After abandoning their equipment and heavy weapons the Axis remnants attempted to break out overland in small groups. Altogether 9,000 prisoners were taken north of Alekseevka by the end of the next day.

On January 25 the Red Army launched the Voronezh–Kastornoye Offensive, which mostly involved the northern forces of Voronezh Front plus Bryansk Front in an effort to encircle and destroy German 2nd Army and those elements of Hungarian 2nd Army that had escaped the previous offensive. The 219th remained in 18th Corps until early February when it returned to direct command of Voronezh Front. In April the division was reassigned to 40th Army as a separate division, still in Voronezh Front, and remained there during the preparations for the German summer offensive.

== Battle of Kursk ==
German plan of attack, showing position of 40th Army.

Around the beginning of June the personnel of the 219th were reported as being roughly 30 percent Russian, 30 percent Ukrainian, and 40 percent of various Asian nationalities. 40th Army was defending along a 50km-wide sector bordered by 38th Army on the right and a line on the left from Ivnya to Melovoe to Sumovskaya station to Khotmyzhsk. The 219th was in the first echelon with the 237th, 206th and 100th Rifle Divisions; two more divisions were in second echelon and another in reserve. The division had two regiments in a single echelon in the forward edge of the main defensive zone with the reserve regiment located about 4km to its rear.

The offensive began on July 5 but 40th Army was not in the direct path of the main attack of 4th Panzer Army. By July 9 the Front commander, Army Gen. N. F. Vatutin had growing concerns that German forces would advance on the Oboyan–Kursk axis and therefore ordered the Army commander, Lt. Gen. K. S. Moskalenko, to move the 219th from the Raktinoye–Proletarskii area to the Kruglik–Kursakovka–Alisovka line. It began this move at 2000 hours and occupied its designated line by the morning of July 11. During the previous day the Oboyan paved road had been defended by the 67th Guards Rifle Division plus the 10th Tank and 3rd Mechanized Corps against up to 100 German tanks. Despite holding their positions the arrival of the 219th and 184th Rifle Divisions was a welcome reinforcement.

Meanwhile, Vatutin drew up an operational plan to encircle the main German forces advancing on Oboyan and Prokhorovka. For this purpose the two rifle divisions were subordinated to 6th Guards Army's 22nd Guards Rifle Corps, which also commanded the 90th Guards Rifle Division. This plan proved abortive as the German attack was renewed at 0900 hours on July 11 and part of their tank forces were directed at the open left flank of 90th Guards; within hours this division was partly encircled and required the assistance of the 184th to withdraw to new defenses. A slightly less ambitious effort was organized for the next day by the commander of 6th Guards, Lt. Gen. I. M. Chistyakov, but 22nd Guards Corps was delayed in reaching its jumping-off positions. The 219th and 184th finally attacked at 1300 hours directly off the march without any artillery preparation, with 5th Guards and 10th Tank Corps in support and 90th Guards in second echelon. They faced fierce resistance from the 3rd SS Panzer and 332nd Infantry Divisions and by the end of the day reached a line from Rakovo to the Kubasovskii gully.

This day marked the climax on the battle on the south face of the salient but not the end of the fighting. On the morning of July 14 the two tank corps and the 184th came under attack by an infantry division and up to 100 tanks from the Rakovo–Berezovka area, forcing a withdrawal. The 219th found it necessary to pull back its right flank to the western slopes of height 240.2 and the Kubasovskii gully, which was also threatened by an infantry regiment and 20 additional tanks. On July 15 Vatutin ordered the 6th Guards Army over to a static defense.

== Into Western Russia ==
On July 27 the division was withdrawn to 20th Army in the Reserve of the Supreme High Command for rebuilding and redeployment. While in the Reserve it was moved north to join Kalinin Front on August 10. General Kotelnikov left the division on August 29, being replaced in command by Col. Afanasii Sergeevich Pypyrev. A few days later Kotelnikov took over the 1st Rifle Corps, to which his former division was also assigned. The Corps was under direct command of the Front. On September 19 Col. Vasilii Grigorevich Kovalenko replaced Colonel Pypyrev; this officer would continue to lead the division, apart from two short breaks, for the duration of the war.

=== Vitebsk Offensive ===
Before the beginning of October the division had been moved to the 84th Rifle Corps of 39th Army, still in Kalinin (as of October 20 1st Baltic) Front. This Army was located south of Velizh and was facing elements of VI Army Corps of 3rd Panzer Army. Following the liberation of Smolensk the next obvious objective was the Belarusian city of Vitebsk, which was intended to be taken by October 10. The Army commander, Lt. Gen. N. E. Berzarin, was to conduct the Front's main attack through Rudnya and Liozna. He chose to deploy his 84th and 5th Guards Rifle Corps, backed by a small mobile group, along the Smolensk–Vitebsk highway; the 84th's four divisions (219th, 184th, 158th and 134th) were backed by the 46th Mechanized Brigade and the 158th was in second echelon. Rudnya was liberated by 5th Guards Corps on September 29 and on October 3 the 134th and 184th Divisions breached the defenses northeast of Mikulino, forcing a German withdrawal on October 6 to new positions north and south of Liozna. In heavy fighting through the 7th and 8th the 84th Corps cleared the town with help from the mobile group and the remaining defenders fell back to a new line 10km to the west late on October 9, which was reached by the pursuit on the 12th. Given the attrition suffered in the nine previous days the offensive was paused for regrouping.

=== Pustoshka-Idritsa Offensive ===
Later that month the 219th was redeployed again to the north, being assigned to 4th Shock Army as a separate division, still in 1st Baltic Front. The 4th and 3rd Shock Armies had made a surprise breakthrough on October 6 at the boundary between Army Groups North and Center and liberated Nevel before getting into the German rear areas. The offensive was renewed in an early morning fog on November 2 when the two Shock Armies penetrated the defenses of the left flank of 3rd Panzer Army southwest of Nevel. After the breakthrough, which opened a 16km-wide gap, 3rd Shock turned to the north behind the flank of 16th Army while 4th Shock moved southwest behind 3rd Panzer Army.

Shortly after this new phase began the 3rd Shock, now in 2nd Baltic Front, was reinforced with three more rifle divisions, including the 219th. When it arrived the division was deployed on the Army's left flank to maintain contact with 4th Shock. By mid-month, supported by 118th Tank Brigade and flanked on the left by 146th Rifle Division the 119th Guards Rifle Division liberated the village of Podberezye and threatened to sever the Novosokolniki–Pustoshka rail line. The situation so concerned the German command that six infantry battalions were brought in from 18th Army to reinforce the approaches to Pustoshka, which effectively halted the push toward that city as torrential rains began on November 15. The Front went over to the defense on November 21.

=== Idritsa-Opochka Offensive ===
By the start of December the 219th had been assigned to the 79th Rifle Corps. This Corps was defending the western flank of the Novosokolniki-Pustoshka salient with the 219th and 171st Rifle Divisions in first echelon and the 28th in reserve, facing 16th Army's VIII Army Corps. On December 9 the STAVKA ordered the Front to pierce their defenses at Pustoshka, capture the town of Idritsa, and destroy the German forces in the salient between Nevel and Novosokolniki. This effort began on December 16 but after several days failed to make any gains and was shut down.

== Baltic Offensives ==
During March 1944 the division was moved to the 93rd Rifle Corps, still in 3rd Shock Army of 2nd Baltic Front. From April 6–13 it was under the command of Lt. Col. Nikolai Fedorovich Perederii. 2nd Baltic began the Rezhitsa–Dvinsk Offensive on July 10; the 219th was deployed northwest of Pustoshka facing the defenses of the Panther Line along the Alolya River. Two days later the division won a battle honor:

IDRITSA... 219th Rifle Division (Colonel Kovalenko, Vasilii Grigorevich)... The troops who participated in the breakthrough of the enemy’s defenses northwest and west of Novosokolniki, and the liberation of Idritsa, by the order of the Supreme High Command of 12 July 1944, and a commendation in Moscow, are given a salute of 20 artillery salvoes from 224 guns.

Within a few days the division crossed the border into Latvia.

=== The Fight at Hill 144 ===
On July 19 the division was approaching the village of Rundēni. Colonel Kovalenko gave orders in person to Sen. Sgt. Khakimyan Rakhimovich Akhmetgalin to lead his platoon of the 1st Rifle Company of the 375th Rifle Regiment to seize height 144 overlooking the village with the objective of providing an observation point for the divisional artillery. Akhmetgalin formed a group of 11 men plus radio operator Zina Kuvaldina. After eliminating a German machine gun position the group captured the hill and spread out to defend it. Kuvaldina soon established contact and directed fire on troops and transport in the village. After about 30 minutes the German forces figured out that they must be being observed from the hill and began their own artillery and mortar fire on the position. Akhmetgalin now ordered Kuvaldina back to the main lines. While waiting for relief over the rest of the day and overnight the steadily-dwindling platoon held off multiple attacks. The platoon leader was killed by a mortar fragment near the end of the first day. Sgt. Pyotr Konstantinovich Syroezhkin took over the defense. By now seven men were left alive, but one, Sen. Sgt. Vasilii Antonovich Andronov, was paralyzed from four wounds. The following day saw nine more German attacks on the hill until Syroezhkin was the last man standing; he was killed by a mortar shell in the early afternoon. The attackers occupied the height briefly and captured Krasnoarmeets Urunbai Abdulaev who was shell-shocked and unconscious. They were soon forced off by a unit of the 119th Guards Division which discovered Andronov and evacuated him. The rest of the defenders were known or presumed dead. On March 24, 1945, 11 men were made Heroes of the Soviet Union:

- Senior Sergeant Khakimyan Rakhimovich Akhmetgalin (Bashkir);
- Senior Sergeant Vasilii Antonovich Andronov (Russian);
- Sergeant Pyotr Konstantinovich Syroezhkin (Russian);
- Junior Sergeant Matvei Stepanovich Chernov (Chuvash);
- Krasnoarmeets Fyodor Ivanovich Ashmarov (Chuvash);
- Krasnoarmeets Chutak Urazov (Uzbek);
- Krasnoarmeets Tukubai Taigaraev (Kyrgyz);
- Krasnoarmeets Urunbai Abdulaev (Uzbek);
- Krasnoarmeets Yakov Savelyevich Shakurov (Tatar);
- Krasnoarmeets Mikhail Ermilovich Shkurakov (Russian);
- Krasnoarmeets Tishebai Karabaev (Uzbek).

An investigation later revealed that Karabaev had actually surrendered during the battle and had survived. His supposed posthumous awards were revoked in 1952. Abdulaev survived prison camp without knowing the outcome of the fight or the fate of his comrades. He finally received his awards 16 years later.

=== Riga Offensive and Courland Pocket ===
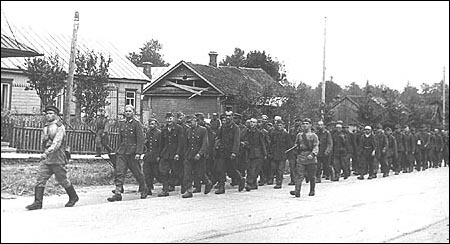
German PoWs march through Rēzekne in July 1944.

The city of Rēzekne was cleared of German forces on July 27 and the 219th was recognized for its role when it received the Order of the Red Banner on August 9. Later that month the division and its 93rd Corps were moved to 42nd Army, still in 2nd Baltic Front, and as the advance continued into Latvia by mid-September it had reached an area northeast of Krustpils; a few weeks later it was located southeast of Baldone. By this time it had again been reassigned with its Corps, now to 22nd Army in the same Front. The division would remain in this Army for the duration of its existence. Riga was liberated on October 13; on November 15 Colonel Kovalenko handed his command to his deputy, Col. Stepan Ivanovich Stepanov but returned exactly a month later. The new year saw the Army containing the German forces trapped in the Courland pocket. In February the 219th was moved to the 100th Rifle Corps and would remain under this command for the duration. In March the 2nd Baltic Front was disbanded and 22nd Army was reassigned to the Courland Group of Forces of Leningrad Front.

== Postwar ==
On April 22 the entire 22nd Army was removed to the Reserve of the Supreme High Command and railed southward where it came under the command of the Odessa Military District. At the time of the German surrender the men and women of the division shared the full title of 219th Rifle, Idritsa, Order of the Red Banner Division. (Russian: 219-я стрелковая Идрицкая Краснознамённая дивизия.) It was disbanded before the end of 1945. Colonel Kovalenko went on to command the 49th Guards Rifle Division from October 1945 to July 1946.
