= Olkhovatka =

Olkhovatka (Russian: Ольховатка) is the name of several inhabited localities in Russia.

== Belgorod Oblast ==
As of 2010, four rural localities in Belgorod Oblast bear this name:

- Olkhovatka, Gubkinsky District, Belgorod Oblast, a selo in Gubkinsky District
- Olkhovatka, Ivnyansky District, Belgorod Oblast, a selo in Ivnyansky District
- Olkhovatka, Korochansky District, Belgorod Oblast, a khutor in Korochansky District
- Olkhovatka, Novooskolsky District, Belgorod Oblast, a selo in Novooskolsky District

== Kaliningrad Oblast ==
As of 2010, one rural locality in Kaliningrad Oblast bears this name:

- Olkhovatka, Kaliningrad Oblast, a settlement in Kalininsky Rural Okrug of Gusevsky District

== Kursk Oblast ==
As of 2010, four rural localities in Kursk Oblast bear this name:

- Olkhovatka, Andreyevsky Selsoviet, Kastorensky District, Kursk Oblast, a village in Andreyevsky Selsoviet of Kastorensky District
- Olkhovatka, Voznesenovsky Selsoviet, Kastorensky District, Kursk Oblast, a village in Voznesenovsky Selsoviet of Kastorensky District
- Olkhovatka, Ponyrovsky District, Kursk Oblast, a selo in Olkhovatsky Selsoviet of Ponyrovsky District
- Olkhovatka, Pristensky District, Kursk Oblast, a village in Pristensky Selsoviet of Pristensky District

== Lipetsk Oblast ==
As of 2010, one rural locality in Lipetsk Oblast bears this name:

- Olkhovatka, Lipetsk Oblast, a village in Naberezhansky Selsoviet of Volovsky District

== Voronezh Oblast ==
As of 2010, three inhabited localities in Voronezh Oblast bear this name:

- Olkhovatka, Olkhovatsky District, Voronezh Oblast, a work settlement in Olkhovatsky District
- Olkhovatka, Ramonsky District, Voronezh Oblast, a village in Sklyayevskoye Rural Settlement of Ramonsky District
- Olkhovatka, Verkhnemamonsky District, Voronezh Oblast, a selo in Olkhovatskoye Rural Settlement of Verkhnemamonsky District
