= Lozovoye =

Lozovoye (Russian: Лозовое) is the name of several inhabited localities:

- Lozovoye, Belogorsky District, Amur Oblast, a selo in Kustanayevsky Selsoviet of Belogorsky District, Amur Oblast
- Lozovoye, Tambovsky District, Amur Oblast, a selo in Sadovsky Selsoviet of Tambovsky District, Amur Oblast
- Lozovoye, Voronezh Oblast
- Lozovoye, Rovensky District, Belgorod Oblast
- Lozovoe (Pavlodar Region), Kazakhstan
