= Karayashnik =

Karayashnik Караяшник
- Sloboda
- Location within Voronezh Oblast Location within Russia
- Coordinates: 50°25′N 39°12′E
- Country: Russia
- Region: Voronezh Oblast
- District: Olkhovatsky District
- Time zone: UTC+3:00

Karayashnik (Russian: Караяшник) is a rural locality (a sloboda) and the administrative center of Karayashnikovskoye Rural Settlement, Olkhovatsky District, Voronezh Oblast, Russia. The population was 621 as of 2010. There are 10 streets.

== Geography ==
Karayashnik is located 20 km north of Olkhovatka (the district's administrative centre) by road. Novomoskovsky is the nearest rural locality.
