= Kostovo =

Kostovo Костово
- Selo
- Location within Voronezh Oblast Location within Russia
- Coordinates: 50°11′N 39°09′E
- Country: Russia
- Region: Voronezh Oblast
- District: Olkhovatsky District
- Time zone: UTC+3:00

Kostovo (Russian: Костово) is a rural locality (a selo) and the administrative center of Stepnyanskoye Rural Settlement, Olkhovatsky District, Voronezh Oblast, Russia. The population was 695 as of 2010. There are 8 streets.

== Geography ==
Kostovo is located 21 km southwest of Olkhovatka (the district's administrative centre) by road. Konnoye is the nearest rural locality.
