= Kolodezhnoye =

Kolodezhnoye Колодежное
- Selo
- Location within Voronezh Oblast Location within Russia
- Coordinates: 50°37′N 39°50′E
- Country: Russia
- Region: Voronezh Oblast
- District: Podgorensky District
- Time zone: UTC+3:00

Kolodezhnoye (Russian: Колодежное) is a rural locality (a selo) and the administrative center of Kolodezhanskoye Rural Settlement, Podgorensky District, Voronezh Oblast, Russia. The population was 643 as of 2010. There are 5 streets.

== Geography ==
Kolodezhnoye is located 34 km northeast of Podgorensky (the district's administrative centre) by road. Pokrovka is the nearest rural locality.
