= Bugayevka =

Bugayevka Бугаевка
- Settlement
- Location within Voronezh Oblast Location within Russia
- Coordinates: 50°17′N 39°19′E
- Country: Russia
- Region: Voronezh Oblast
- District: Olkhovatsky District
- Time zone: UTC+3:00

Bugayevka (Russian: Бугаевка) is a rural locality (a settlement) in Olkhovatskoye Urban Settlement, Olkhovatsky District, Voronezh Oblast, Russia. The population was 1,717 as of 2010. There are 11 streets.

== Geography ==
Bugayevka is located 4 km northeast of Olkhovatka (the district's administrative centre) by road. Olkhovatka is the nearest rural locality.
