= Okrayushkin =

Okrayushkin Окраюшкин
- Khutor
- Location within Voronezh Oblast Location within Russia
- Coordinates: 50°29′N 39°35′E
- Country: Russia
- Region: Voronezh Oblast
- District: Podgorensky District
- Time zone: UTC+3:00

Okrayushkin (Russian: Окраюшкин) is a rural locality (a khutor) in Perevalenskoye Rural Settlement, Podgorensky District, Voronezh Oblast, Russia. The population was 142 as of 2010. There are 5 streets.

== Geography ==
Okrayushkin is located 15 km north of Podgorensky (the district's administrative centre) by road. Probuzhdeniye is the nearest rural locality.
