= Rodina Geroya =

Rodina Geroya Родина Героя
- Khutor
- Location within Voronezh Oblast Location within Russia
- Coordinates: 50°07′N 39°11′E
- Country: Russia
- Region: Voronezh Oblast
- District: Olkhovatsky District
- Time zone: UTC+3:00

Rodina Geroya (Russian: Родина Героя) is a rural locality (a khutor) in Stepnyanskoye Rural Settlement, Olkhovatsky District, Voronezh Oblast, Russia. The population was 123 as of 2010. There are 4 streets.

== Geography ==
Rodina Geroya is located 22 km southwest of Olkhovatka (the district's administrative centre) by road. Nerovnovka is the nearest rural locality.
