= Vitebsk, Voronezh Oblast =

Vitebsk Витебск
- Khutor
- Location within Voronezh Oblast Location within Russia
- Coordinates: 50°25′N 39°56′E
- Country: Russia
- Region: Voronezh Oblast
- District: Podgorensky District
- Time zone: UTC+3:00

Vitebsk (Russian: Ви́тебск) is a rural locality (a khutor) and the administrative center of Vitebskoye Rural Settlement, Podgorensky District, Voronezh Oblast, Russia. The population was 215 as of 2010. There are 6 streets.

== Geography ==
Vitebsk is located 32 km east of Podgorensky (the district's administrative centre) by road. Saprino is the nearest rural locality.
