= Varvarovka, Podgorensky District, Voronezh Oblast =

Varvarovka Варваровка
- Khutor
- Location within Voronezh Oblast Location within Russia
- Coordinates: 50°28′N 39°21′E
- Country: Russia
- Region: Voronezh Oblast
- District: Podgorensky District
- Time zone: UTC+3:00

Varvarovka (Russian: Варва́ровка) is a rural locality (a khutor) in Grishevskoye Rural Settlement, Podgorensky District, Voronezh Oblast, Russia. The population was 125 as of 2010. There are three streets.

== Geography ==
Varvarovka is located 29 km (18 mi) northwest of Podgorensky (the district's administrative centre) by road. Saprino is the nearest rural locality.
