= Mamonovka, Voronezh Oblast =

Mamonovka Мамоновка
- Selo
- Location within Voronezh Oblast Location within Russia
- Coordinates: 50°23′N 40°30′E
- Country: Russia
- Region: Voronezh Oblast
- District: Verkhnemamonsky District
- Time zone: UTC+3:00

Mamonovka (Russian: Мамоновка) is a rural locality (a selo) and the administrative center of Mamonovskoye Rural Settlement, Verkhnemamonsky District, Voronezh Oblast, Russia. The population was 631 as of 2010. There are 10 streets.

== Geography ==
Mamonovka is located 33 km north of Verkhny Mamon (the district's administrative centre) by road. Russkaya Zhuravka is the nearest rural locality.
