= Alexey Dobryden =

Soviet metallurgist (1926–1980)

Alexey Afanasyevich Dobryden
- Born: 20 May 1926; Ol'khovatka, Voronezh Oblast, Russia
- Died: 9 October 1980 (aged 54); Yekaterinburg, Russia
- Education: Ural State Technical University (Ph.D. 1956)
- Spouse: Inna Mikhailovna Peshkova (m. 1954)
- Children: Elena A. Stepanova, Mikhail A. Dobryden
- Awards: Order of the Red Banner of Labour Order of the Badge of Honour Medal "For the Victory over Germany in the Great Patriotic War 1941–1945"

Alexey Afanasyevich Dobryden (Russian: Алексей Афанасьевич Добрыдень; 20 May 1926 – 9 October 1980) was a Soviet metallurgist and party leader.

== Biography ==
Dobryden was born and raised in Ol'khovatka, Olkhovatsky District, Voronezh Oblast by his parents, Afanasy Andreevich Dobryden and Pelageya Korneevna Dobryden née Poltavtseva.

While in secondary school, he served as secretary of the primary Komsomol organization. During the occupation of the Olkhovatsky District by Italian and German troops, he organized an underground group that collected weapons and distributed leaflets containing reports from Sovinformburo dropped by Soviet aircraft. During the liberation of the Voronezh Region, his group armed, participated alongside fighter squads in the destruction of the remnants of Nazi troops. After the liberation of the Olkhovatsky District, Dobryden worked for the district newspaper "Kollektivist" and then became secretary of the district Komsomol committee.

From late 1943, he was called into service for the Soviet Army on 9 December 1943 when he was 17 years old, from December 1945 he served as corporal in the 10th brigade of the NKVD troops. He was the Komsomol organizer of the battalion and an instructor for the editorial staff of the political department's large-circulation newspaper.

After he got demobilised from the army on 25 July 1951, he graduated from the working youth school No. 1 at the Sverdlovsk station. He later studied at the metallurgical faculty of the Ural State Technical University, from which he graduated in December 1956 and received a diploma as a metallurgical engineer with a specialty in Foundry. While at the institute, he was elected deputy secretary of the institute's Komsomol committee, became a member of the CPSU, and served as secretary of the party bureau of the metallurgical department. He met his future wife, Inna Mikhailovna Peshkova (27 August 1928 - 12 April 2015), they married on 7 November 1954 in Yekaterinburg. They had two children together; Elena Alekseevna Stepanova (1956 - 2026) and Mikhail Alekseevich Dobryden (1963 - ).

After graduating, he was assigned to work at the Institute of Metallurgy of the Ural Branch of the USSR Academy of Sciences. In 1959, he entered graduate school, and in April 1968, he defended his PhD dissertation on "Electrochemical Desulfurization of Iron and Slags". He then remained in the Department of Theory of Metallurgical Processes at UPI. In March 1965, he was promoted to associate professor.

In 1965, he switched to party work and until the end of his life worked as the head department of Science and Educational Institutes of the Sverdlovsk Regional Committee of the CPSU. He was elected as a member of the Sverdlovsk Regional Committee of the Communist Party of the Soviet Union, a deputy of the Sverdlovsk City Council of People's Deputies, and for many years served as secretary of the party bureau. In November 1976, he was awarded the military rank of major in the Reserve.

Dobryden was one of Boris Yeltsin's principal assistants in preparing speeches and reports. Yeltsin's speeches were always distinguished by their clarity, iron logic and strong argumentation. Much of the credit belongs to Dobryden.

He worked on several urban-planning projects. He became close to architect Gennady. I. Belyankin during the creation of a new institution, the Industrial-Pedagogical Institute. The three of them, Dobryden, Belyankin and V. V. Blyukher, began working on solutions concerning the site, temporary facilities and the design of the future campus. The final decision was made by Yeltsin and P. M. Shamanov; the institute was to be located in the Uralmash District. The institute was expected to forge a highly qualified workforce for industrial enterprises throughout the city, the region and the country, since no other institution of this kind existed anywhere in the Soviet Union.

Dobryden died on 9 October 1980 in Yekaterinburg. He was buried at the Shirokorechenskoye Cemetery. Boris Yeltsin was present at his funeral. Belyankin happened to be standing among the crowd surrounding the gravesite, directly opposite of Yeltsin. In Belyankin's memoir; Me and the City: The Dominant Feature of My Life in 2005, he describes that he saw a completely different side of him. "At that moment I understood that this hard—and at times even harsh—man, both toward himself and toward others, a man of iron will, physical endurance, and self-control, could in certain moments of life lose control over himself and become humanly vulnerable and defenseless, just like all of us mortals."
