= Nerovnovka =

Nerovnovka Неровновка
- Sloboda
- Location within Voronezh Oblast Location within Russia
- Coordinates: 50°08′N 39°14′E
- Country: Russia
- Region: Voronezh Oblast
- District: Olkhovatsky District
- Time zone: UTC+3:00

Nerovnovka (Russian: Неровновка) is a rural locality (a sloboda) in Stepnyanskoye Rural Settlement, Olkhovatsky District, Voronezh Oblast, Russia. The population was 695 as of 2010. There are 9 streets.

== Geography ==
Nerovnovka is located 21 km southwest of Olkhovatka (the district's administrative centre) by road. Rodina Geroya is the nearest rural locality.
