= Kryukov, Voronezh Oblast =

Kryukov Крюков
- Khutor
- Location within Voronezh Oblast Location within Russia
- Coordinates: 50°24′N 39°14′E
- Country: Russia
- Region: Voronezh Oblast
- District: Olkhovatsky District
- Time zone: UTC+3:00

Kryukov (Russian: Крюков) is a rural locality (a khutor) in Karayashnikovskoye Rural Settlement, Olkhovatsky District, Voronezh Oblast, Russia. The population was 79 as of 2010.

== Geography ==
Kryukov is located 19 km north of Olkhovatka (the district's administrative centre) by road. Karayashnik is the nearest rural locality.
