= Posyolok imeni Lenina, Voronezh Oblast =

Posyolok imeni Lenina Посёлок имени Ленина
- Settlement
- Location within Voronezh Oblast Location within Russia
- Coordinates: 50°28′N 39°10′E
- Country: Russia
- Region: Voronezh Oblast
- District: Olkhovatsky District
- Time zone: UTC+3:00

Posyolok imeni Lenina (Russian: Посёлок имени Ленина) is a rural locality (a settlement) in Karayashnikovskoye Rural Settlement, Olkhovatsky District, Voronezh Oblast, Russia. The population was 85 as of 2010. There are 4 streets.

== Geography ==
The settlement is located 32 km north of Olkhovatka (the district's administrative centre) by road. Yurasovka is the nearest rural locality.
