= Dolzhik, Podgorensky District, Voronezh Oblast =

Rural settlement in Voronezh Oblast, Russia

Dolzhik Должик
- Khutor
- Location within Voronezh Oblast Location within Russia
- Coordinates: 50°28′N 39°48′E
- Country: Russia
- Region: Voronezh Oblast
- District: Podgorensky District
- Time zone: UTC+3:00

Dolzhik (Russian: До́лжик) is a rural locality (a khutor) in Sergeyevskoye Rural Settlement, Podgorensky District, Voronezh Oblast, Russia. The population was 64 as of 2010. There are two streets.

== Geography ==
Dolzhik is located 21 km (13 mi) northeast of Podgorensky (the district's administrative centre) by road. Sergeyevka is the nearest rural locality.
