= Politotdelskoye, Voronezh Oblast =

Politotdelskoye Политотдельское
- Settlement
- Location within Voronezh Oblast Location within Russia
- Coordinates: 50°23′N 39°25′E
- Country: Russia
- Region: Voronezh Oblast
- District: Olkhovatsky District
- Time zone: UTC+3:00

Politotdelskoye (Russian: Политотдельское) is a rural locality (a settlement) in Lisichanskoye Rural Settlement, Olkhovatsky District, Voronezh Oblast, Russia. The population was 172 as of 2010. There are 5 streets.

== Geography ==
Politotdelskoye is located 22 km northwest of Olkhovatka (the district's administrative centre) by road. Postoyaly is the nearest rural locality.
