= Nizhny Mamon =

Nizhny Mamon Нижний Мамон
- Selo
- Location within Voronezh Oblast Location within Russia
- Coordinates: 50°11′N 40°30′E
- Country: Russia
- Region: Voronezh Oblast
- District: Verkhnemamonsky District
- Time zone: UTC+3:00

Nizhny Mamon (Russian: Нижний Мамон) is a rural locality (a selo) and the administrative center of Nizhnemamonskoye 1-ye Rural Settlement, Verkhnemamonsky District, Voronezh Oblast, Russia. The population was 3,464 (2021 census) and 2,106 as of 2010. There are 34 streets.

== Geography ==
Nizhny Mamon is located 11 km east of Verkhny Mamon (the district's administrative centre) by road. Prirechnoye is the nearest rural locality.
