= Kosharnoye =

Kosharnoye Кошарное
- Settlement
- Location within Voronezh Oblast Location within Russia
- Coordinates: 50°27′N 39°23′E
- Country: Russia
- Region: Voronezh Oblast
- District: Podgorensky District
- Time zone: UTC+3:00

Kosharnoye (Russian: Коша́рное) is a rural locality (a settlement) in Grishevskoye Rural Settlement, Podgorensky District, Voronezh Oblast, Russia. The population was 62 as of 2010.

== Geography ==
Kosharnoye is located 25 km northwest of Podgorensky (the district's administrative centre) by road. Postoyaly is the nearest rural locality.
