= Orobinsky =

Orobinsky Оробинский
- Khutor
- Location within Voronezh Oblast Location within Russia
- Coordinates: 50°02′N 40°13′E
- Country: Russia
- Region: Voronezh Oblast
- District: Verkhnemamonsky District
- Time zone: UTC+3:00

Orobinsky (Russian: Оробинский) is a rural locality (a khutor) in Derezovskoye Rural Settlement founded by the family Orobinskii, Verkhnemamonsky District, Voronezh Oblast, Russia. The population was 174 as of 2010. There are 3 streets.

== History ==
The hamlet was presumably founded in 1760 by a one-homestead peasant with the surname Orobinsky. It is likely that the founder relocated from the northern counties of the Voronezh Governorate. According to the second revision list of 1835, two Orobinsky families — descendants of the founder — lived in the hamlet at the time.

In the 19th century, representatives of other families also lived in Orobinsk: the Alferovs, Gladchenkos, Zelenskys, Kolbasins, Limarevs, Nebratenkovs, Pisarenkovs, Rybalchins, Solodovnikovs, and others. According to the census of that period, the hamlet had 47 households and 321 residents.

The majority of the Verkhny Mamon District population is ethnically Russian, but in villages such as Makarovka, Olkhovatka, and Orobinsk, people of Ukrainian origin lived who now identify as Russian.

== Geography ==
Orobinsky is located 40 km southwest of Verkhny Mamon (the district's administrative centre) by road. Derezovka is the nearest rural locality.

== Origin of the Surname Orobinsky ==
The surname “Orobinsky” most often has Polish origins or is associated with neighboring countries — Belarus and Ukraine. Most bearers of the surname belonged to the Polish nobility, and around 10% may have been descendants of ancient Russian princely or boyar families. The surname indicates a geographic location or settlement from which the family originated.

In some cases, the surname was given to graduates of theological seminaries. Bearers of the surname appear in old documents of the Russian clergy in the Tula region from the 16th–17th centuries. During the reign of Ivan the Terrible, the surname appeared on lists of noble and harmonious-sounding names that were awarded to courtiers as a mark of favor or reward.
