= Grishevka =

Grishevka Гришевка
- Khutor
- Location within Voronezh Oblast Location within Russia
- Coordinates: 50°27′N 39°29′E
- Country: Russia
- Region: Voronezh Oblast
- District: Podgorensky District
- Time zone: UTC+3:00

Grishevka (Russian: Гри́шевка) is a rural locality (a khutor) in Grishevskoye Rural Settlement, Podgorensky District, Voronezh Oblast, Russia. The population was 53 as of 2010.

== Geography ==
Grishevka is located 15 km northwest of Podgorensky (the district's administrative centre) by road. Stepanovka is the nearest rural locality.
