= Sukhaya Rossosh =

Sukhaya Rossosh Сухая Россошь
- Khutor
- Location within Voronezh Oblast Location within Russia
- Coordinates: 50°36′N 39°36′E
- Country: Russia
- Region: Voronezh Oblast
- District: Podgorensky District
- Time zone: UTC+3:00

Sukhaya Rossosh (Russian: Суха́я Ро́ссошь) is a rural locality (a khutor) in Beryozovskoye Rural Settlement, Podgorensky District, Voronezh Oblast, Russia. The population was 211 as of 2010. There are 2 streets.

== Geography ==
Sukhaya Rossosh is located 35 km north of Podgorensky (the district's administrative centre) by road. Beryozovo is the nearest rural locality.
