= Podgorensky =

Podgorensky (masculine), Podgorenskaya (feminine), or Podgorenskoye (neuter) may refer to:

- Podgorensky District, a district of Voronezh Oblast, Russia
- Podgorensky (urban-type settlement), an urban locality (an urban-type settlement) in Podgorensky District of Voronezh Oblast, Russia
- Podgorenskaya, a rural locality (a stanitsa) in Rostov Oblast, Russia
