= Verkhny Karabut =

Verkhny Karabut Верхний Карабут
- Selo
- Location within Voronezh Oblast Location within Russia
- Coordinates: 50°33′N 39°55′E
- Country: Russia
- Region: Voronezh Oblast
- District: Podgorensky District
- Time zone: UTC+3:00

Verkhny Karabut (Russian: Ве́рхний Карабу́т) is a rural locality (a selo) in Beloroyevskoye Rural Settlement, Podgorensky District, Voronezh Oblast, Russia. The population was 289 as of 2010. There are 6 streets.

== Geography ==
Verkhny Karabut is located 42 km northeast of Podgorensky (the district's administrative centre) by road. Babka is the nearest rural locality.
