= Bolshiye Bazy =

Settlement in Olkhovatsky District, Russia

Bolshiye Bazy Большие Базы
- Settlement
- Location within Voronezh Oblast Location within Russia
- Coordinates: 50°16′N 39°16′E
- Country: Russia
- Region: Voronezh Oblast
- District: Olkhovatsky District
- Time zone: UTC+3:00

Bolshiye Bazy (Russian: Большие Базы) is a rural locality (a settlement) in Olkhovatskoye Urban Settlement, Olkhovatsky District, Voronezh Oblast, Russia. The population was 2,572 as of 2010. There are 19 streets.

== Geography ==
Bolshiye Bazy is located 4 km south of Olkhovatka (the district's administrative centre) by road. Olkhovatka is the nearest rural locality.
