= Remezovo =

Remezovo Ремезово
- Khutor
- Location within Voronezh Oblast Location within Russia
- Coordinates: 50°15′N 39°22′E
- Country: Russia
- Region: Voronezh Oblast
- District: Olkhovatsky District
- Time zone: UTC+3:00

Remezovo (Russian: Ремезово) is a rural locality (a khutor) in Shaposhnikovskoye Rural Settlement, Olkhovatsky District, Voronezh Oblast, Russia. The population was 69 as of 2010.

== Geography ==
Remezovo is located 11 km southeast of Olkhovatka (the district's administrative centre) by road. Shaposhnikovka is the nearest rural locality.
