= Lugovoy, Podgorensky District, Voronezh Oblast =

Lugovoy Луговой
- Khutor
- Location within Voronezh Oblast Location within Russia
- Coordinates: 50°23′N 39°37′E
- Country: Russia
- Region: Voronezh Oblast
- District: Podgorensky District
- Time zone: UTC+3:00

Lugovoy (Russian: Лугово́й) is a rural locality (a khutor) in Podgorenskoye Urban Settlement, Podgorensky District, Voronezh Oblast, Russia. The population was 438 as of 2010. There are 6 streets.

== Geography ==
Lugovoy is located 3 km south of Podgorensky (the district's administrative centre) by road. Nikolsky is the nearest rural locality.
