= Malaya Sudyovka =

Malaya Sudyovka Малая Судьёвка
- Khutor
- Location within Voronezh Oblast Location within Russia
- Coordinates: 50°23′N 39°35′E
- Country: Russia
- Region: Voronezh Oblast
- District: Podgorensky District
- Time zone: UTC+3:00

Malaya Sudyovka (Russian: Ма́лая Судьёвка) is a rural locality (a khutor) in Skororybskoye Rural Settlement, Podgorensky District, Voronezh Oblast, Russia. The population was 58 as of 2010.

== Geography ==
Malaya Sudyovka is located 7 km southwest of Podgorensky (the district's administrative centre) by road, on the right bank of the Gnilaya Rossosh River. Petropavlovka is the nearest rural locality.
