= Novaya Sotnya =

Novaya Sotnya Новая Сотня
- Khutor
- Location within Voronezh Oblast Location within Russia
- Coordinates: 50°26′N 39°07′E
- Country: Russia
- Region: Voronezh Oblast
- District: Olkhovatsky District
- Time zone: UTC+3:00

Novaya Sotnya (Russian: Новая Сотня) is a rural locality (a khutor) in Kopanyanskoye Rural Settlement, Olkhovatsky District, Voronezh Oblast, Russia. The population was 169 as of 2010.

== Geography ==
Novaya Sotnya is located 28 km northwest of Olkhovatka (the district's administrative centre) by road. Kopanaya 1-ya is the nearest rural locality.
