= Beryozovo, Podgorensky District, Voronezh Oblast =

Beryozovo Берёзово
- Selo
- Location within Voronezh Oblast Location within Russia
- Coordinates: 50°36′N 39°32′E
- Country: Russia
- Region: Voronezh Oblast
- District: Podgorensky District
- Time zone: UTC+3:00

Beryozovo (Russian: Берёзово) is a rural locality (a selo) in Beryozovskoye Rural Settlement, Podgorensky District, Voronezh Oblast, Russia. The population was 369 as of 2010. There are 8 streets.

== Geography ==
Beryozovo is located 30 km north of Podgorensky (the district's administrative centre) by road. Saguny is the nearest rural locality.
