= Sud-Nikolayevka =

Sud-Nikolayevka Суд-Николаевка
- Selo
- Location within Voronezh Oblast Location within Russia
- Coordinates: 50°20′N 39°37′E
- Country: Russia
- Region: Voronezh Oblast
- District: Podgorensky District
- Time zone: UTC+3:00

Sud-Nikolayevka (Russian: Суд-Никола́евка) is a rural locality (a selo) and the administrative center of Pervomayskoye Rural Settlement, Podgorensky District, Voronezh Oblast, Russia. The population was 719 as of 2010. There are 9 streets.

== Geography ==
Sud-Nikolayevka is located 10 km south of Podgorensky (the district's administrative centre) by road. Pokrovka is the nearest rural locality.
