= Kostyukovka, Voronezh Oblast =

Kostyukovka Костюковка
- Selo
- Location within Voronezh Oblast Location within Russia
- Coordinates: 50°35′N 39°41′E
- Country: Russia
- Region: Voronezh Oblast
- District: Podgorensky District
- Time zone: UTC+3:00

Kostyukovka (Russian: Костюко́вка) is a rural locality (a selo) in Sagunovskoye Rural Settlement, Podgorensky District, Voronezh Oblast, Russia. The population was 197 as of 2010. There are 4 streets.

== Geography ==
Kostyukovka is located 24 km north of Podgorensky (the district's administrative centre) by road. Bolshaya Khvoshchevatka is the nearest rural locality.
