= Ternovoye, Podgorensky District, Voronezh Oblast =

Ternovoye Терновое
- Settlement
- Location within Voronezh Oblast Location within Russia
- Coordinates: 50°31′N 39°19′E
- Country: Russia
- Region: Voronezh Oblast
- District: Podgorensky District
- Time zone: UTC+3:00

Ternovoye (Russian: Терно́вое) is a rural locality (a settlement) in Grishevskoye Rural Settlement, Podgorensky District, Voronezh Oblast, Russia. The population was 220 as of 2010. There are 2 streets.

== Geography ==
Ternovoye is located 35 km northwest of Podgorensky (the district's administrative centre) by road. Grigoryevka is the nearest rural locality.
