= Salovka =

Salovka Саловка
- Settlement
- Location within Voronezh Oblast Location within Russia
- Coordinates: 50°18′N 39°18′E
- Country: Russia
- Region: Voronezh Oblast
- District: Olkhovatsky District
- Time zone: UTC+3:00

Salovka (Russian: Саловка) is a rural locality (a settlement) in Olkhovatskoye Urban Settlement, Olkhovatsky District, Voronezh Oblast, Russia. The population was 339 as of 2010. There are 2 streets.

== Geography ==
Salovka is located 4 km north of Olkhovatka (the district's administrative centre) by road. Rakovka is the nearest rural locality.
