= Maryevka, Olkhovatsky District, Voronezh Oblast =

Maryevka Марьевка
- Sloboda
- Location within Voronezh Oblast Location within Russia
- Coordinates: 50°18′N 39°09′E
- Country: Russia
- Region: Voronezh Oblast
- District: Olkhovatsky District
- Time zone: UTC+3:00

Maryevka (Russian: Марьевка) is a rural locality (a sloboda) and the administrative center of Maryevskoye Rural Settlement, Olkhovatsky District, Voronezh Oblast, Russia. The population was 590 as of 2010. There are 7 streets.

== Geography ==
Maryevka is located 14 km northwest of Olkhovatka (the district's administrative centre) by road. Gvozdovka is the nearest rural locality.
