= Krasyukovsky =

Krasyukovsky Красюковский
- Khutor
- Location within Voronezh Oblast Location within Russia
- Coordinates: 50°30′N 39°39′E
- Country: Russia
- Region: Voronezh Oblast
- District: Podgorensky District
- Time zone: UTC+3:00

Krasyukovsky (Russian: Красюковский) is a rural locality (a khutor) and the administrative center of Bolshedmitrovskoye Rural Settlement, Podgorensky District, Voronezh Oblast, Russia. The population was 286 as of 2010.

== Geography ==
Krasyukovsky is located 14 km north of Podgorensky (the district's administrative centre) by road. Bolshaya Dmitrovka is the nearest rural locality.
