= 2025 Russia bridge collapses =

Bridge collapses in Bryansk and Kursk Oblast, Russia

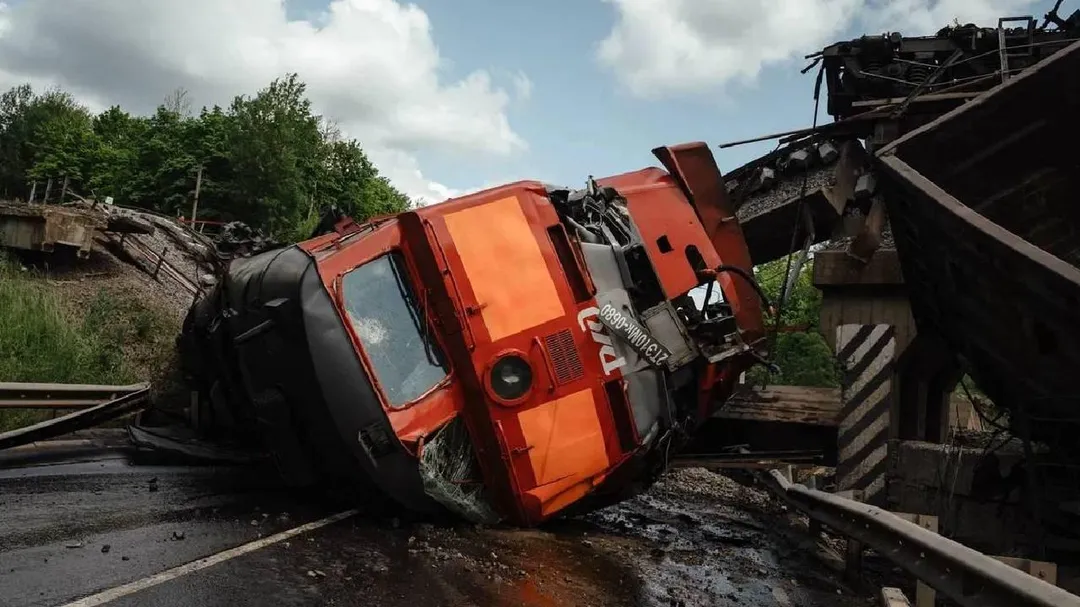
- Wreckage of a diesel locomotive following the bombing of a bridge in Kursk Oblast
- Location: 53.0785134°N 34.0167906°E (referred to the Bryansk Oblast event); Bryansk Oblast, Kursk Oblast, Russia
- Date: 31 May and 1 June 2025; 22:44 in Bryansk Oblast; 02:30 in Kursk Oblast
- Attack type: Bombing
- Deaths: 8: 7 in Bryansk Oblast; 1 in Kursk Oblast
- Injuries: 122: 119 in Bryansk Oblast; 2 in Kursk Oblast
- Perpetrator: Special forces of Ukraine (May Bryansk attack)

In the night from 31 May to 1 June 2025, during the ongoing Russo-Ukrainian war, one bridge in Bryansk Oblast and one in Kursk Oblast, both are Russian regions next to Ukraine, were partially destroyed in explosions.

The bridge in Bryansk Oblast, near the village of Vygonichi, was destroyed at about 22:44 Moscow Time (UTC+3) as a passenger train traveling on the Klimov–Moscow route was approaching the bridge. The train crashed into the debris of the fallen structure and derailed, leading to seven deaths and more than a hundred injuries.

== Bridge collapses ==
=== Bryansk Oblast ===
At 22:44 (Moscow Time) on 31 May, a passenger train hauled by a TEP70 diesel locomotive traveling from Klimov to Moscow via Bryansk, on its way to the A240 road bridge, was derailed when a powerful explosion collapsed half of the bridge at an angle of 45°, which caused one of the Miratorg trucks traveling on the bridge to fall down. The locomotive collided with the collapsed structure, causing several passenger cars to overturn. Most news reports stated that the bridge collapsed onto the passenger train, but the newspaper Moskovskij Komsomolets reported that the bridge collapsed half an hour before the train derailed. There were several other Miratorg trucks on the bridge, which later complicated the rescue operation to save those trapped under the debris of the train; there were more than 70 people under the rubble, including children.

The preliminary cause of the collapse was said to be an explosion. According to Telegram channels, the bridge was blown up in two places via four explosive devices, of which two were placed on the bridge support and two on the sleepers.

=== Kursk Oblast ===
At 02:30 on 1 June, nearly four hours after the Bryansk bridge collapse, a railroad bridge in Zheleznogorsky District in Kursk, 48 kilometres (30 mi) into the Trosna–Kalinovka highway and over which a 2TE10MK-0680 diesel locomotive with several freight cars was traveling, collapsed down onto a highway. The train caught fire.

== Casualties ==
=== Bryansk Oblast ===
Wreckage of the TEP70 locomotive and a passenger coach being removed from the scene

In Bryansk Oblast, the TEP70 diesel locomotive and several passenger coaches suffered irreparable damage. Both driver's cabins of the diesel locomotive were almost completely destroyed and half of the roof and walls of the body were flattened on the side of one of them. Some cars were twisted and bent, and some had their bogies torn off. By 1 June, the locomotive and three passenger cars damaged by the incident had been removed, and the process of clearing the remains of the fallen overpass structures had begun. The truck was also damaged, but to a lesser extent.

Seven people, including the driver and assistant, died in the first Bryansk Oblast bridge collapse, while 119 others were injured, including the truck driver, three children and an infant. Among those sent to Moscow for treatment included four children.

About 40 people received medical care in local hospitals.

=== Kursk Oblast ===
In Kursk Oblast, the first section of the 2TE10MK locomotive fell along with the bridge onto the road and turned on its side, receiving moderate damage, the second section of the locomotive and freight cars remained on the track, but derailed and were turned sideways at an angle and their bogies were torn off. It was initially reported that three people – the locomotive's driver and two of his assistants – were injured and hospitalized. Russian Railways later announced that one of the train workers had succumbed to their injuries in hospital.

== Rescue operation ==
Immediately after the explosion and collapse in Bryansk, people who were near the scene began to help pull people out from under the wreckage of the train and bridge. Sixteen ambulances and a rescue team were dispatched to the scene. All the injured were taken to a safe distance and examined by medics.

== Investigation ==
The transportation prosecutor's office said it was conducting an audit. It described the events as "unlawful interference in transportation operations". The collapses were probed as acts of terrorism.

The Russian Investigative Committee initially stated that both bridges were collapsed by explosions, then it removed the mention of "explosions", so the statements read the bridges simply "collapsed" and then once again restored the "explosions" wording on the following day. It blamed the acts on terrorists acting on the orders of the "Kyiv regime".

In 20 August 2025, the FSB claimed to have intercepted a Ukrainian sabotage unit belonging to the Special Operations Forces in Bryansk Oblast, killing three members and capturing two others including the unit's commander, Oleksandr Zhuk. He confessed to the FSB that Special forces of Ukraine were behind the May 2025 Bryansk bridge attack and the September 2024 Belgorod train derailment.

== Other explosion events ==
In the beginning of June 2025, additional explosions occurred in the Russian railway in the southwest of the country. These events did not yield victims but damaged operation of transport system.

=== Bryansk Oblast ===
On 1 June in the morning, another explosion occurred in Bryansk Oblast—on the Unecha–Zhecha section when a track-measuring locomotive with two cars was passing overhead. No damage or casualties were reported.

=== Crimean Bridge ===
On 3 June 2025 early in the morning (at 4:44), the Crimean Bridge across the Kerch Strait was attacked. The attack targeted the underwater supports of the bridge. Road traffic was resumed after a several-hours suspension, nobody was injured and no visible destruction appeared, although Ukraine claimed underwater damage.

=== Voronezh Oblast ===
On 5 June, an explosion occurred at the Yevdakovo-Saguny railroad crossing in Voronezh Oblast. Several improvised explosive devices were found at the scene of the incident. The Federal Security Service of the Russian Federation said that the tracks had been blown up. It happened before the train approached, but the driver and his colleagues noticed the damage to the rails in time and undertook emergency braking.

=== Belgorod Oblast ===
On 6 June, a reserve diesel locomotive derailed as a result of an explosion in Prokhorovsky district of Belgorod Oblast. This was reported by regional governor Vyacheslav Gladkov.

== Reactions ==
Governor of Bryansk Oblast Alexander Bogomaz said: "Currently, there has been a traffic accident involving cars and a passenger railway train near a section of the A240 federal highway. Unfortunately, there are casualties. All emergency services, representatives of the authorities are working on the site".

Governor of Kursk Oblast Alexander Khinshtein, said that one of the freight train's drivers sustained leg injuries. A photograph released by Khinshtein showed the derailed train jutting off the collapsed bridge.

US Secretary of State Marco Rubio, during a telephone conversation with Sergey Lavrov, expressed condolences over the civilian casualties resulting from the bridge explosions.

On June 4, Vladimir Putin stated that the blowing up of the bridges was aimed at disrupting the next round of negotiations with Ukraine in Istanbul. According to him, the attacks were directed against the civilian population.

On July 6, the participants of the BRICS summit, held in Brazil, strongly condemned the attacks on the bridges and railway infrastructure in a joint declaration.
