= Malye Bazy =

Malye Bazy Малые Базы
- Settlement
- Location within Voronezh Oblast Location within Russia
- Coordinates: 50°15′N 39°18′E
- Country: Russia
- Region: Voronezh Oblast
- District: Olkhovatsky District
- Time zone: UTC+3:00

Malye Bazy (Russian: Малые Базы) is a rural locality (a settlement) in Olkhovatskoye Urban Settlement, Olkhovatsky District, Voronezh Oblast, Russia. The population was 1,660 as of 2010. There are 17 streets.

== Geography ==
Malye Bazy is located 5 km south of Olkhovatka (the district's administrative centre) by road. Bolshiye Bazy is the nearest rural locality.
