= Pobedinshchina =

Pobedinshchina Побединщина
- Khutor
- Location within Voronezh Oblast Location within Russia
- Coordinates: 50°22′N 39°41′E
- Country: Russia
- Region: Voronezh Oblast
- District: Podgorensky District
- Time zone: UTC+3:00

Pobedinshchina (Russian: Победи́нщина) is a rural locality (a khutor) in Sergeyevskoye Rural Settlement, Podgorensky District, Voronezh Oblast, Russia. The population was 189 as of 2010.

== Geography ==
Pobedinshchina is located 10 km southeast of Podgorensky (the district's administrative centre) by road. Kuleshovka is the nearest rural locality.
