= Adrianovka =

Adrianovka Андриановка
- Khutor
- Location within Voronezh Oblast Location within Russia
- Coordinates: 50°26′N 39°11′E
- Country: Russia
- Region: Voronezh Oblast
- District: Olkhovatsky District
- Time zone: UTC+3:00

Adrianovka (Russian: Андриановка) is a rural locality (a khutor) in Karayashnikovskoye Rural Settlement, Olkhovatsky District, Voronezh Oblast, Russia. The population was 118 as of 2010. There are 2 streets.

== Geography ==
Adrianovka is located 24 km north of Olkhovatka (the district's administrative centre) by road. Rybny is the nearest rural locality.
