= Limarev =

Limarev Лимарев
- Khutor
- Location within Voronezh Oblast Location within Russia
- Coordinates: 50°23′N 39°04′E
- Country: Russia
- Region: Voronezh Oblast
- District: Olkhovatsky District
- Time zone: UTC+3:00

Limarev (Russian: Лимарев) is a rural locality (a khutor) in Maryevskoye Rural Settlement, Olkhovatsky District, Voronezh Oblast, Russia. The population was 219 as of 2010. There are 2 streets.

== Geography ==
Limarev is located 26 km northwest of Olkhovatka (the district's administrative centre) by road. Kravtsovka is the nearest rural locality.
