= Gvozdovka =

Gvozdovka Гвоздовка
- Khutor
- Location within Voronezh Oblast Location within Russia
- Coordinates: 50°17′N 39°09′E
- Country: Russia
- Region: Voronezh Oblast
- District: Olkhovatsky District
- Time zone: UTC+3:00

Gvozdovka (Russian: Гвоздовка) is a rural locality (a khutor) in Maryevskoye Rural Settlement, Olkhovatsky District, Voronezh Oblast, Russia. The population was 579 as of 2010. There are 5 streets.

== Geography ==
Gvozdovka is located on the Chyornaya Kalitva River, 13 km northwest of Olkhovatka (the district's administrative centre) by road. Maryevka is the nearest rural locality.
