= Krasny Voskhod, Voronezh Oblast =

Krasny Voskhod Красный Восход
- Settlement
- Location within Voronezh Oblast Location within Russia
- Coordinates: 50°36′N 39°37′E
- Country: Russia
- Region: Voronezh Oblast
- District: Podgorensky District
- Time zone: UTC+3:00

Krasny Voskhod (Russian: Кра́сный Восхо́д) is a rural locality (a settlement) in Beryozovskoye Rural Settlement, Podgorensky District, Voronezh Oblast, Russia. The population was 783 as of 2010. There are 7 streets.

== Geography ==
Krasny Voskhod is located 29 km north of Podgorensky (the district's administrative centre) by road. Saguny is the nearest rural locality.
