= Kolesnikovo, Voronezh Oblast =

Kolesnikovo Колесниково
- Khutor
- Location within Voronezh Oblast Location within Russia
- Coordinates: 50°28′N 39°04′E
- Country: Russia
- Region: Voronezh Oblast
- District: Olkhovatsky District
- Time zone: UTC+3:00

Kolesnikovo (Russian: Колесниково) is a rural locality (a khutor) in Kopanyanskoye Rural Settlement, Olkhovatsky District, Voronezh Oblast, Russia. The population was 95 as of 2010.

== Geography ==
Kolesnikovo is located 34 km northwest of Olkhovatka (the district's administrative centre) by road. Kopanaya 1-ya is the nearest rural locality.
