= Osetrovka =

Osetrovka Осетровка
- Selo
- Location within Voronezh Oblast Location within Russia
- Coordinates: 50°08′N 40°28′E
- Country: Russia
- Region: Voronezh Oblast
- District: Verkhnemamonsky District
- Time zone: UTC+3:00

Osetrovka (Russian: Осетровка) is a rural locality (a selo) and the administrative center of Osetrovskoye Rural Settlement, Verkhnemamonsky District, Voronezh Oblast, Russia. The population was 799 as of 2010. There are 8 streets.

== Geography ==
Osetrovka is located 8 km southeast of Verkhny Mamon (the district's administrative centre) by road. Verkhny Mamon is the nearest rural locality.
