= Goncharovka, Voronezh Oblast =

Goncharovka Гончаровка
- Selo
- Location within Voronezh Oblast Location within Russia
- Coordinates: 50°31′N 39°28′E
- Country: Russia
- Region: Voronezh Oblast
- District: Podgorensky District
- Time zone: UTC+3:00

Goncharovka (Russian: Гончаро́вка) is a rural locality (a selo) and the administrative center of Goncharovskoye Rural Settlement, Podgorensky District, Voronezh Oblast, Russia. The population was 907 as of 2010. There are 9 streets.

== Geography ==
Goncharovka is located on the Gnilaya Rossosh River, 24 km northwest of Podgorensky (the district's administrative centre) by road. Perevalnoye is the nearest rural locality.
