= Lozovoye, Voronezh Oblast =

Lozovoye Лозовое
- Selo
- Location within Voronezh Oblast Location within Russia
- Coordinates: 50°16′N 40°21′E
- Country: Russia
- Region: Voronezh Oblast
- District: Verkhnemamonsky District
- Time zone: UTC+3:00

Lozovoye (Russian: Лозовое) is a rural locality (a selo) and the administrative center of Lozovskoye 1-ye Rural Settlement, Verkhnemamonsky District, Voronezh Oblast, Russia. The population was 1,220 as of 2010. There are 14 streets.

== Geography ==
Lozovoye is located 13 km north of Verkhny Mamon (the district's administrative centre) by road. Prirechnoye is the nearest rural locality.
