= Lykovo, Voronezh Oblast =

Lykovo Лыково
- Selo
- Location within Voronezh Oblast Location within Russia
- Coordinates: 50°32′N 39°47′E
- Country: Russia
- Region: Voronezh Oblast
- District: Podgorensky District
- Time zone: UTC+3:00

Lykovo (Russian: Лы́ково) is a rural locality (a selo) and the administrative center of Lykovskoye Rural Settlement, Podgorensky District, Voronezh Oblast, Russia. The population was 337 as of 2010. There are 7 streets.

== Geography ==
Lykovo is located 23 km northeast of Podgorensky (the district's administrative centre) by road. Shiroky is the nearest rural locality.
