= Prirechoye, Voronezh Oblast =

Prirechnoye Приречное
- Selo
- Location within Voronezh Oblast Location within Russia
- Coordinates: 50°13′N 40°28′E
- Country: Russia
- Region: Voronezh Oblast
- District: Verkhnemamonsky District
- Time zone: UTC+3:00

Prirechnoye (Russian: Приречное) is a rural locality (a selo) and the administrative center of Prirechenskoye Rural Settlement, Verkhnemamonsky District, Voronezh Oblast, Russia. The population was 762 as of 2010. There are 8 streets.

== Geography ==
Prirechoye is located 10 km northeast of Verkhny Mamon (the district's administrative centre) by road. Nizhny Mamon is the nearest rural locality.
