= Stepanovka, Podgorensky District, Voronezh Oblast =

Stepanovka Степановка
- Khutor
- Location within Voronezh Oblast Location within Russia
- Coordinates: 50°27′N 39°31′E
- Country: Russia
- Region: Voronezh Oblast
- District: Podgorensky District
- Time zone: UTC+3:00

Stepanovka (Russian: Степа́новка) is a rural locality (a khutor) in Grishevskoye Rural Settlement, Podgorensky District, Voronezh Oblast, Russia. The population was 196 as of 2010. There are 3 streets.

== Geography ==
Stepanovka is located 14 km northwest of Podgorensky (the district's administrative centre) by road. Opyt is the nearest rural locality.
