= Prirechny =

Prirechny (masculine), Prirechnaya (feminine), or Prirechnoye (neuter) may refer to:

- Prirechny, Murmansk Oblast, a former urban-type settlement in Murmansk Oblast, Russia; since 2004 or 2005—a settlement of rural type
- Prirechny, Republic of Adygea, a settlement in the Republic of Adygea, Russia
- Prirechoye, Voronezh Oblast, a village in Voronezh Oblast, Russia
- Prirechnoye, name of several rural localities in Russia
