= Postoyaly =

Postoyaly Постоялый
- Khutor
- Location within Voronezh Oblast Location within Russia
- Coordinates: 50°24′N 39°24′E
- Country: Russia
- Region: Voronezh Oblast
- District: Olkhovatsky District
- Time zone: UTC+3:00

Postoyaly (Russian: Постоялый) is a rural locality (a khutor) in Lisichanskoye Rural Settlement, Olkhovatsky District, Voronezh Oblast, Russia. The population was 262 as of 2010. There are 4 streets.

== Geography ==
Postoyaly is located 19 km northeast of Olkhovatka (the district's administrative centre) by road. Politotdelskoye is the nearest rural locality.
