= Opyt, Voronezh Oblast =

Opyt Опыт
- Settlement
- Location within Voronezh Oblast Location within Russia
- Coordinates: 50°26′N 39°31′E
- Country: Russia
- Region: Voronezh Oblast
- District: Podgorensky District
- Time zone: UTC+3:00

Opyt (Russian: О́пыт) is a rural locality (a settlement) and the administrative center of Grishevskoye Rural Settlement, Podgorensky District, Voronezh Oblast, Russia. The population was 733 as of 2010. There are 10 streets.

== Geography ==
Opyt is located 13 km northwest of Podgorensky (the district's administrative centre) by road. Stepanovka is the nearest rural locality.
