= Novokharkovka =

Novokharkovka Новохарьковка
- Sloboda
- Location within Voronezh Oblast Location within Russia
- Coordinates: 50°22′N 39°16′E
- Country: Russia
- Region: Voronezh Oblast
- District: Olkhovatsky District
- Time zone: UTC+3:00

Novokharkovka (Russian: Новохарьковка) is a rural locality (a sloboda) and the administrative center of Novokharkovskoye Rural Settlement, Olkhovatsky District, Voronezh Oblast, Russia. The population was 805 as of 2010. There are 6 streets.

== Geography ==
Novokharkovka is located 13 km north of Olkhovatka (the district's administrative centre) by road. Rakovka is the nearest rural locality.
