= Drozdovo, Voronezh Oblast =

Drozdovo Дроздово
- Khutor
- Location within Voronezh Oblast Location within Russia
- Coordinates: 50°20′N 39°23′E
- Country: Russia
- Region: Voronezh Oblast
- District: Olkhovatsky District
- Time zone: UTC+3:00

Drozdovo (Russian: Дроздово) is a rural locality (a khutor) and the administrative center of Lisichanskoye Rural Settlement, Olkhovatsky District, Voronezh Oblast, Russia. The population was 482 as of 2010. There are 8 streets.

== Geography ==
Drozdovo is located 12 km northeast of Olkhovatka (the district's administrative centre) by road. Bugayevka is the nearest rural locality.
