= Olkhovatka, Verkhnemamonsky District, Voronezh Oblast =

Olkhovatka Ольховатка
- Selo
- Location within Voronezh Oblast Location within Russia
- Coordinates: 50°10′N 40°05′E
- Country: Russia
- Region: Voronezh Oblast
- District: Verkhnemamonsky District
- Time zone: UTC+3:00

Olkhovatka (Russian: Ольховатка) is a rural locality (a selo) and the administrative center of Olkhovatskoye Rural Settlement, Verkhnemamonsky District, Voronezh Oblast, Russia. The population was 929 as of 2010. There are 11 streets.

== Geography ==
Olkhovatka is located 29 km west of Verkhny Mamon (the district's administrative centre) by road. Staraya Kalitva is the nearest rural locality.
