= Saguny =

Saguny Сагуны
- Settlement
- Location within Voronezh Oblast Location within Russia
- Coordinates: 50°35′N 39°36′E
- Country: Russia
- Region: Voronezh Oblast
- District: Podgorensky District
- Time zone: UTC+3:00

Saguny (Russian: Сагу́ны) is a rural locality (a settlement) and the administrative center of Beryozovskoye Rural Settlement, Podgorensky District, Voronezh Oblast, Russia. The population was 246 as of 2010.

== Geography ==
Saguny is located 35 km north of Podgorensky (the district's administrative centre) by road. Beryozovo is the nearest rural locality.
