= Karpenkovo =

Karpenkovo Карпенково
- Selo
- Location within Voronezh Oblast Location within Russia
- Coordinates: 50°37′N 39°20′E
- Country: Russia
- Region: Voronezh Oblast
- District: Kamensky District
- Time zone: UTC+3:00

Karpenkovo (Russian: Карпенково) is a rural locality (a selo) and the administrative center of Karpenkovskoye Rural Settlement, Kamensky District, Voronezh Oblast, Russia. The population was 883 as of 2010. There are 10 streets.

== Geography ==
Karpenkovo is located 15 km southwest of Kamenka (the district's administrative centre) by road. Degtyarnoye is the nearest rural locality.
