= Lozovoye, Belogorsky District, Amur Oblast =

Lozovoye Лозовое
- Selo
- Location within Amur Oblast Location within Russia
- Coordinates: 50°46′N 128°19′E
- Country: Russia
- Region: Amur Oblast
- District: Belogorsky District
- Time zone: UTC+9:00

Lozovoye (Russian: Лозовое) is a rural locality (a selo) in Kustanayevsky Selsoviet of Belogorsky District, Amur Oblast, Russia. The population was 2 as of 2018. There is 1 street.

== Geography ==
Lozovoye is located 27 km southwest of Belogorsk (the district's administrative centre) by road. Kustanayevka is the nearest rural locality.
