= Malakeyevo =

Malakeyevo Малакеево
- Selo
- Location within Belgorod Oblast Location within Russia
- Coordinates: 50°19′N 38°39′E
- Country: Russia
- Region: Belgorod Oblast
- District: Veydelevsky District
- Time zone: UTC+3:00

Malakeyevo (Russian: Малакеево) is a rural locality (a selo) and the administrative center of Malakeyevskoye Rural Settlement, Veydelevsky District, Belgorod Oblast, Russia. The population was 825 as of 2010. There are 13 streets.

== Geography ==
Malakeyevo is located 35 km northeast of Veydelevka (the district's administrative centre) by road. Gritsinin is the nearest rural locality.
