= Rybalkin, Belgorod Oblast =

Rybalkin Рыбалкин
- Khutor
- Location within Belgorod Oblast Location within Russia
- Coordinates: 50°26′N 38°42′E
- Country: Russia
- Region: Belgorod Oblast
- District: Alexeyevsky District
- Time zone: UTC+3:00

Rybalkin (Russian: Рыбалкин) is a rural locality (a khutor) in Alexeyevsky District, Belgorod Oblast, Russia. The population was 114 as of 2010. There is 1 street.

== Geography ==
Rybalkin is located 26 km south of Alexeyevka (the district's administrative centre) by road. Garbuzovo is the nearest rural locality.
