= Olkhovatka, Ramonsky District, Voronezh Oblast =

Olkhovatka Ольховатка
- Village
- Location within Voronezh Oblast Location within Russia
- Coordinates: 51°55′N 39°05′E
- Country: Russia
- Region: Voronezh Oblast
- District: Ramonsky District
- Time zone: UTC+3:00

Olkhovatka (Russian: Ольховатка) is a rural locality (a village) in Sklyayevskoye Rural Settlement, Ramonsky District, Voronezh Oblast, Russia. The population was 91 as of 2010. There are 4 streets.

== Geography ==
Olkhovatka is located near the Olkhovatoye Lake, 23 km west of Ramon (the district's administrative centre) by road. Gnezdilovo is the nearest rural locality.
