= Lozovoye, Rovensky District, Belgorod Oblast =

Lozovoye Лозовое
- Selo
- Location within Belgorod Oblast Location within Russia
- Coordinates: 49°55′N 39°08′E
- Country: Russia
- Region: Belgorod Oblast
- District: Rovensky District
- Time zone: UTC+3:00

Lozovoye (Russian: Лозовое) is a rural locality (a selo) and the administrative center of Lozovskoye Rural Settlement, Rovensky District, Belgorod Oblast, Russia. The population was 502 as of 2010. There are 5 streets.

== Geography ==
Lozovoye is located 20 km east of Rovenki (the district's administrative centre) by road. Shirokon is the nearest rural locality.
