= Solontsy =

Solontsy Солонцы
- Selo
- Location within Belgorod Oblast Location within Russia
- Coordinates: 49°59′N 38°32′E
- Country: Russia
- Region: Belgorod Oblast
- District: Veydelevsky District
- Time zone: UTC+3:00

Solontsy (Russian: Солонцы́) is a rural locality (a selo) and the administrative center of Solontsinsky Rural Settlement, Veydelevsky District, Belgorod Oblast, Russia. The population was 741 as of 2010. There are 9 streets.

== Geography ==
Solontsy is located 22 km southeast of Veydelevka (the district's administrative centre) by road. Stanovoye is the nearest rural locality.
