= Kopanki, Rossoshansky District, Voronezh Oblast =

Kopanki Копанки
- Khutor
- Location within Voronezh Oblast Location within Russia
- Coordinates: 50°16′N 39°30′E
- Country: Russia
- Region: Voronezh Oblast
- District: Rossoshansky District
- Time zone: UTC+3:00

Kopanki (Russian: Копанки) is a rural locality (a khutor) in Novopostoyalovskoye Rural Settlement, Rossoshansky District, Voronezh Oblast, Russia. The population was 212 as of 2010. There are 3 streets.

== Geography ==
Kopanki is located 17 km north of Rossosh (the district's administrative centre) by road. Beshchy is the nearest rural locality.
