= Yevdakovo =

Yevdakovo Евдаково
- Selo
- Location within Voronezh Oblast Location within Russia
- Coordinates: 50°45′N 39°23′E
- Country: Russia
- Region: Voronezh Oblast
- District: Kamensky District
- Time zone: UTC+3:00

Yevdakovo (Russian: Евдаково) is a rural locality (a selo) and the administrative center of Yevdakovskoye Rural Settlement, Kamensky District, Voronezh Oblast, Russia. The population was 676 as of 2010. There are 9 streets.

== Geography ==
Yevdakovo is located 6 km north of Kamenka (the district's administrative centre) by road. Lyapino is the nearest rural locality.
