= Lozovoye, Tambovsky District, Amur Oblast =

Lozovoye Лозовое
- Selo
- Location within Amur Oblast Location within Russia
- Coordinates: 50°14′N 127°52′E
- Country: Russia
- Region: Amur Oblast
- District: Tambovsky District
- Time zone: UTC+9:00

Lozovoye (Russian: Лозовое) is a rural locality (a selo) in Sadovsky Selsoviet of Tambovsky District, Amur Oblast, Russia. The population was 821 as of 2018. There are 12 streets.

== Geography ==
Lozovoye is located 23 km northwest of Tambovka (the district's administrative centre) by road. Tolstovka is the nearest rural locality.
