= Podgornoye, Rossoshansky District, Voronezh Oblast =

Podgornoye Подгорное
- Selo
- Location within Voronezh Oblast Location within Russia
- Coordinates: 50°10′N 39°32′E
- Country: Russia
- Region: Voronezh Oblast
- District: Rossoshansky District
- Time zone: UTC+3:00

Podgornoye (Russian: Подгорное) is a rural locality (a selo) and the administrative center of Podgorenskoye Rural Settlement, Rossoshansky District, Voronezh Oblast, Russia. The population was 2,740 as of 2010. There are 19 streets.

== Geography ==
Podgornoye is located 30 km north of Rossosh, the district's administrative centre, by road. Podgorensky is the nearest rural locality.
