= Verkhny Mamon =

Rural locality in Voronezh Oblast, Russia

Coordinates: 50°09′52″N 40°23′08″E

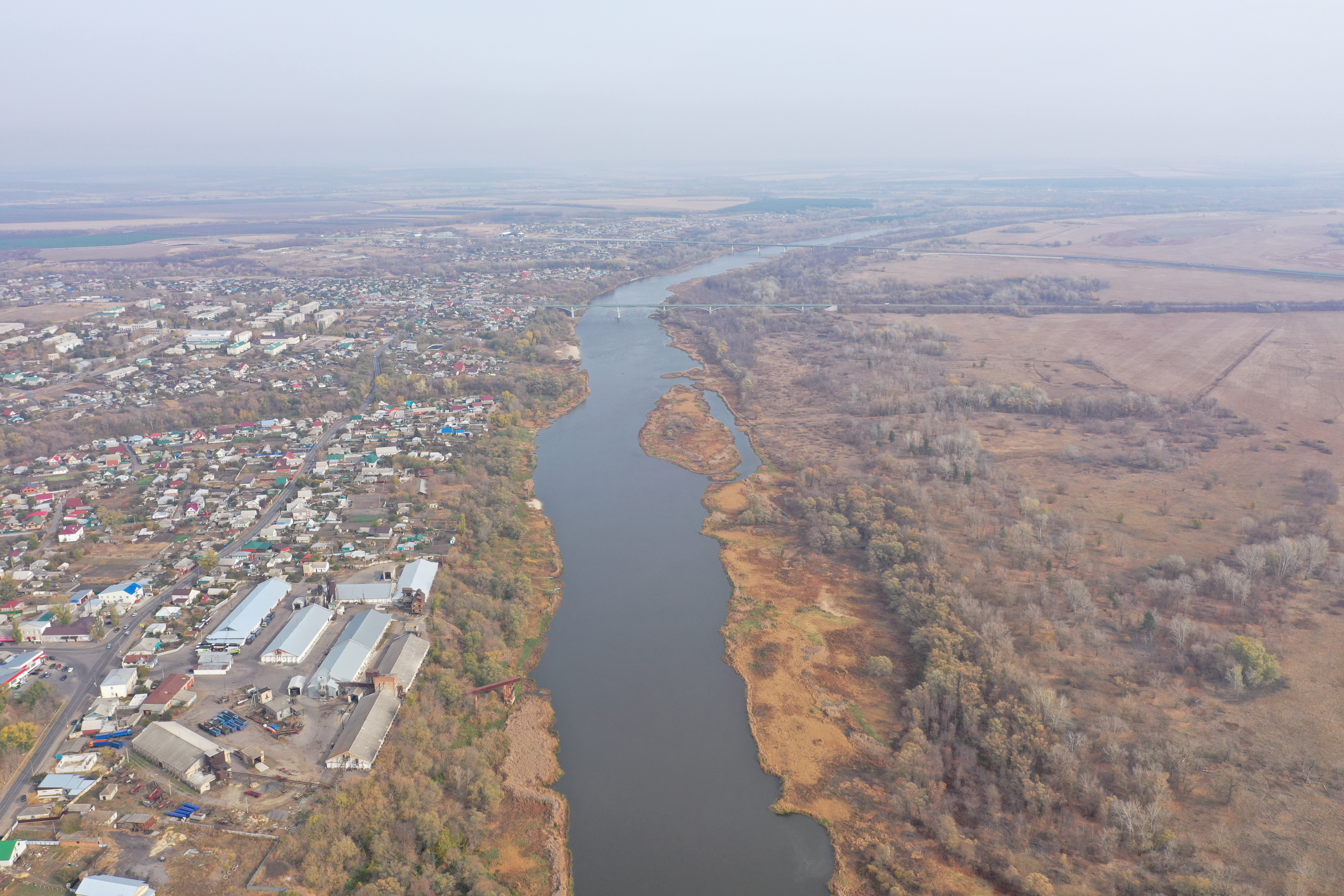
Verkhny Mamon

Verkhny Mamon (Russian: Ве́рхний Мамо́н) is a rural locality (a selo) and the administrative center of Verkhnemamonsky District of Voronezh Oblast, Russia. Population: 7,505 (2021 census); 8,561 (2010 census); 8,394 (2002 census); 7,752 (1989 Soviet census).
