= Verkhnemamonsky District =

Verkhnemamonsky District Верхнемамонский район (Russian)
- District
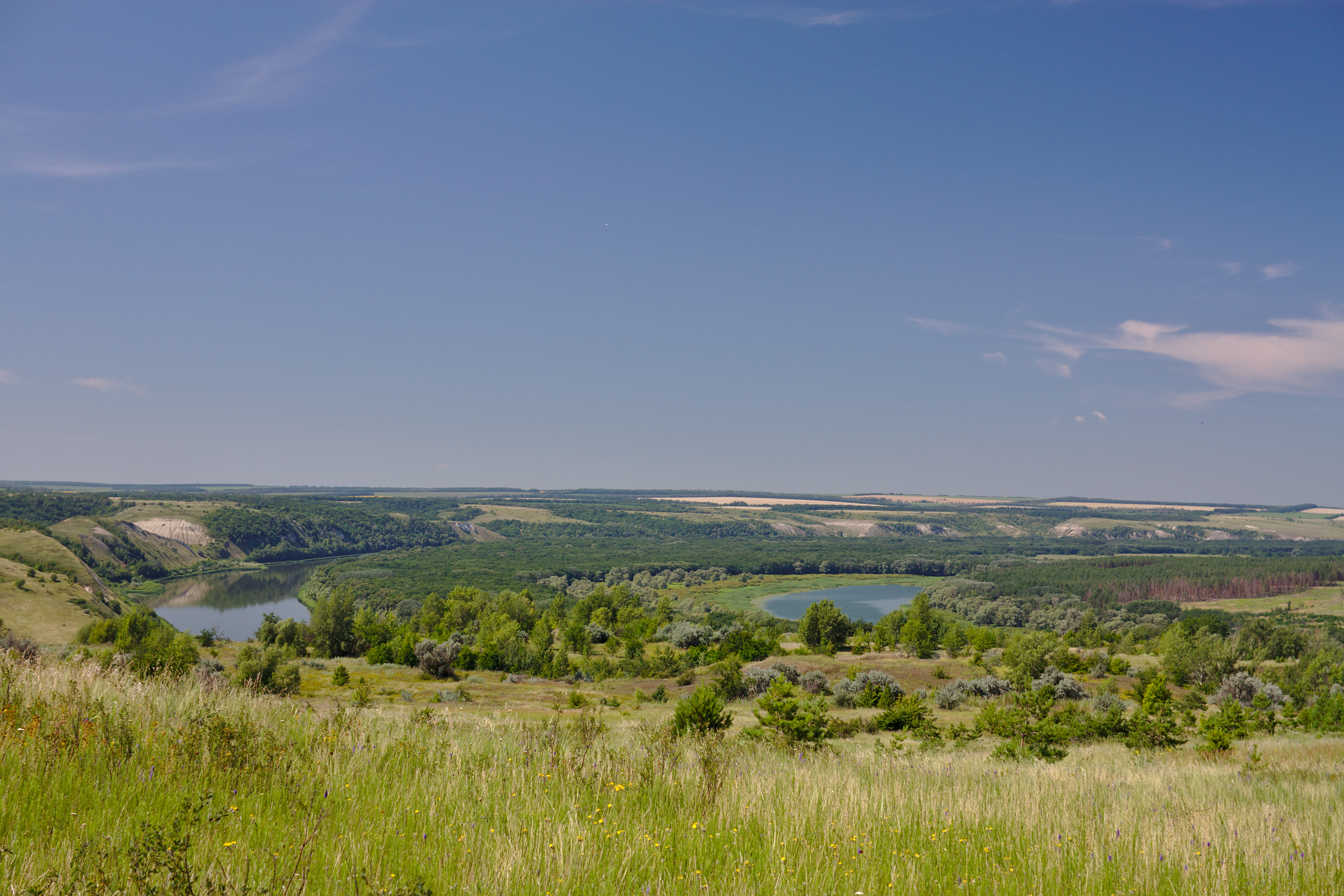
- Don River in Verkhnemamonsky District

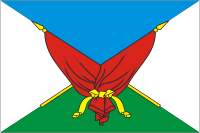
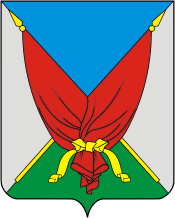
- Flag Coat of arms
- Location of Verkhnemamonsky District in Voronezh Oblast
- Coordinates: 50°09′45″N 40°22′31″E
- Country: Russia
- Federal subject: Voronezh Oblast
- Established: 30 July 1928
- Administrative center: Verkhny Mamon

Area
  - Total: 1,345 km^{2} (519 sq mi)

Population (2010 Census)
  - Total: 21,659
  - Density: 16.10/km^{2} (41.71/sq mi)
  - Urban: 0%
  - Rural: 100%

Administrative structure
  - Administrative divisions: 10 Rural settlements
  - Inhabited localities: 14 rural localities

Municipal structure
  - Municipally incorporated as: Verkhnemamonsky Municipal District
  - Municipal divisions: 0 urban settlements, 10 rural settlements
- Time zone: UTC+3 (MSK)
- OKTMO ID: 20610000
- Website: http://vermamon.ru/

Verkhnemamonsky District (Russian: Верхнемамо́нский райо́н) is an administrative and municipal district (raion), one of the thirty-two in Voronezh Oblast, Russia. It is located in the south of the oblast. The area of the district is 1,345 square kilometers (519 sq mi). Its administrative center is the rural locality (a selo) of Verkhny Mamon. Population: 18,611 (2021 census); 21,659 (2010 census); 23,086 (2002 census); 22,788 (1989 Soviet census). The population of Verkhny Mamon accounts for 40.3% of the district's total population.
