= Podgorensky District =

Podgorensky District Подгоренский район (Russian)
- District
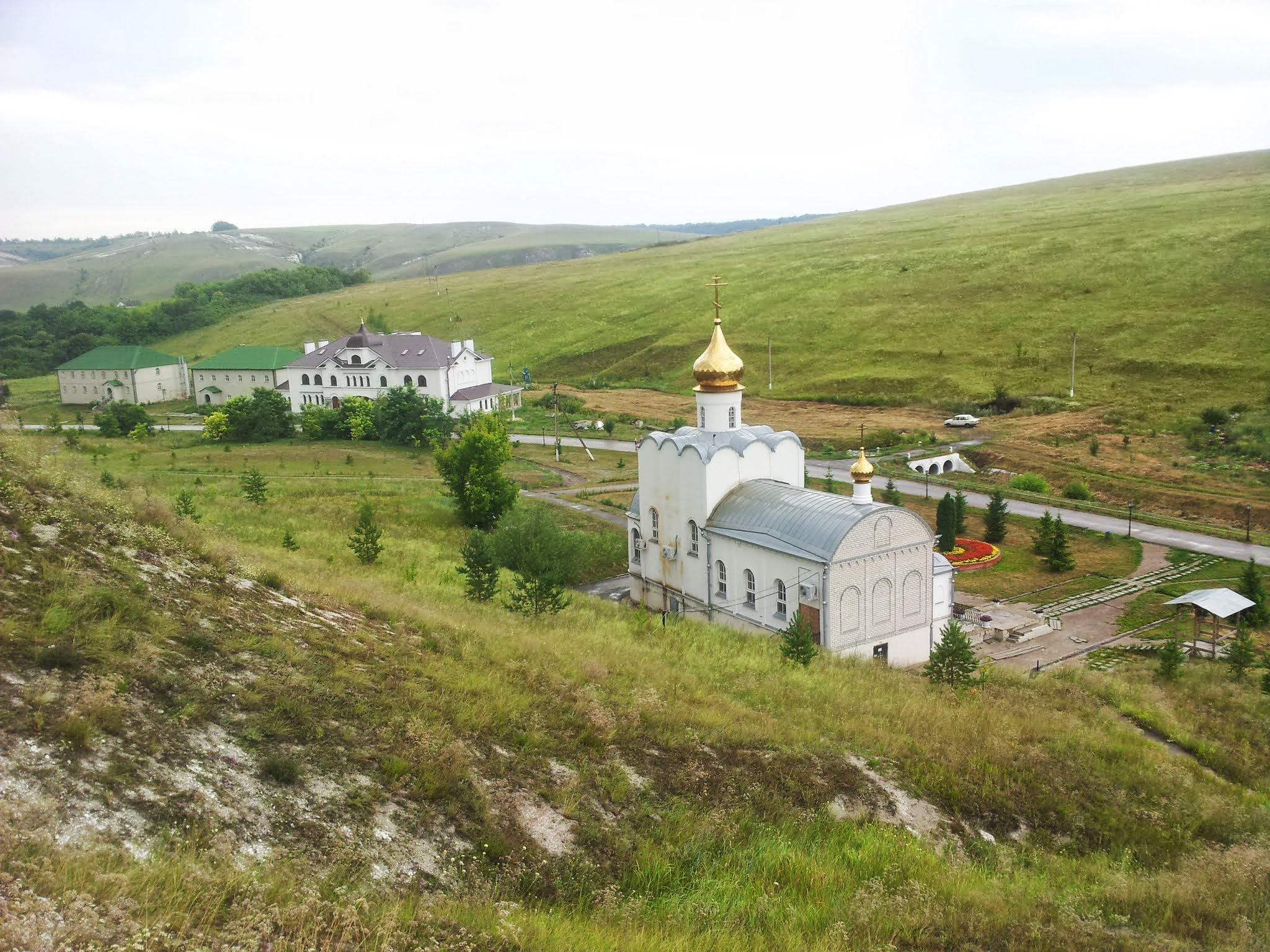
- Rural scene, Podgorensky District

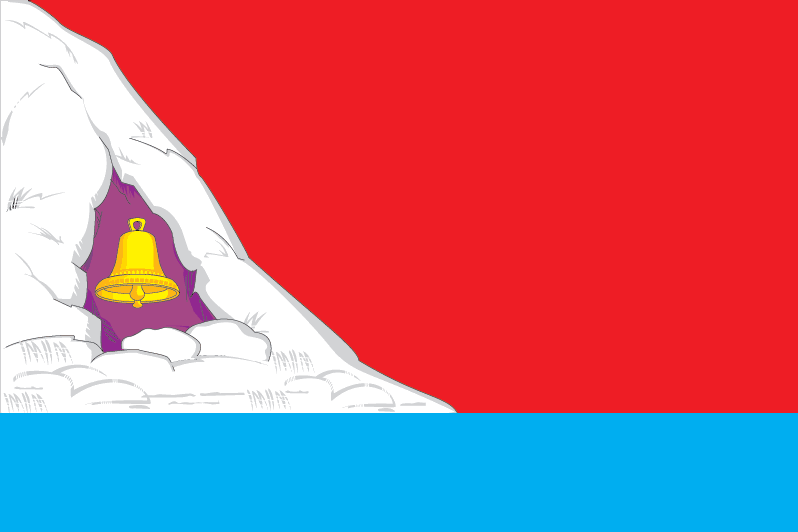
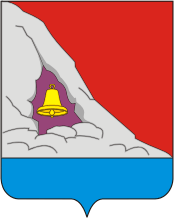
- Flag Coat of arms
- Location of Podgorensky District in Voronezh Oblast
- Coordinates: 50°24′16″N 39°39′00″E
- Country: Russia
- Federal subject: Voronezh Oblast
- Established: 1928
- Administrative center: Podgorensky

Area
  - Total: 1,579 km^{2} (610 sq mi)

Population (2010 Census)
  - Total: 27,340
  - Density: 17.31/km^{2} (44.85/sq mi)
  - Urban: 22.4%
  - Rural: 77.6%

Administrative structure
  - Administrative divisions: 1 Urban settlements, 15 Rural settlements
  - Inhabited localities: 1 urban-type settlements, 75 rural localities

Municipal structure
  - Municipally incorporated as: Podgorensky Municipal District
  - Municipal divisions: 1 urban settlements, 15 rural settlements
- Time zone: UTC+3 (MSK)
- OKTMO ID: 20641000
- Website: http://podgorenskiy.ru/

Podgorensky District (Russian: Подго́ренский райо́н) is an administrative and municipal district (raion), one of the thirty-two in Voronezh Oblast, Russia. It is located in the southwestern central part of the oblast. The area of the district is 1,579 square kilometers (610 sq mi). Its administrative center is the urban locality (an urban-type settlement) of Podgorensky. Population: 23,123 (2021 census); 27,340 (2010 census); 29,563 (2002 census); 31,827 (1989 Soviet census). The population of the administrative center accounts for 24.8% of the district's total population.
