= Ol'khovatka =

Ol'khovatka Ольховатка
- Urban-type settlement
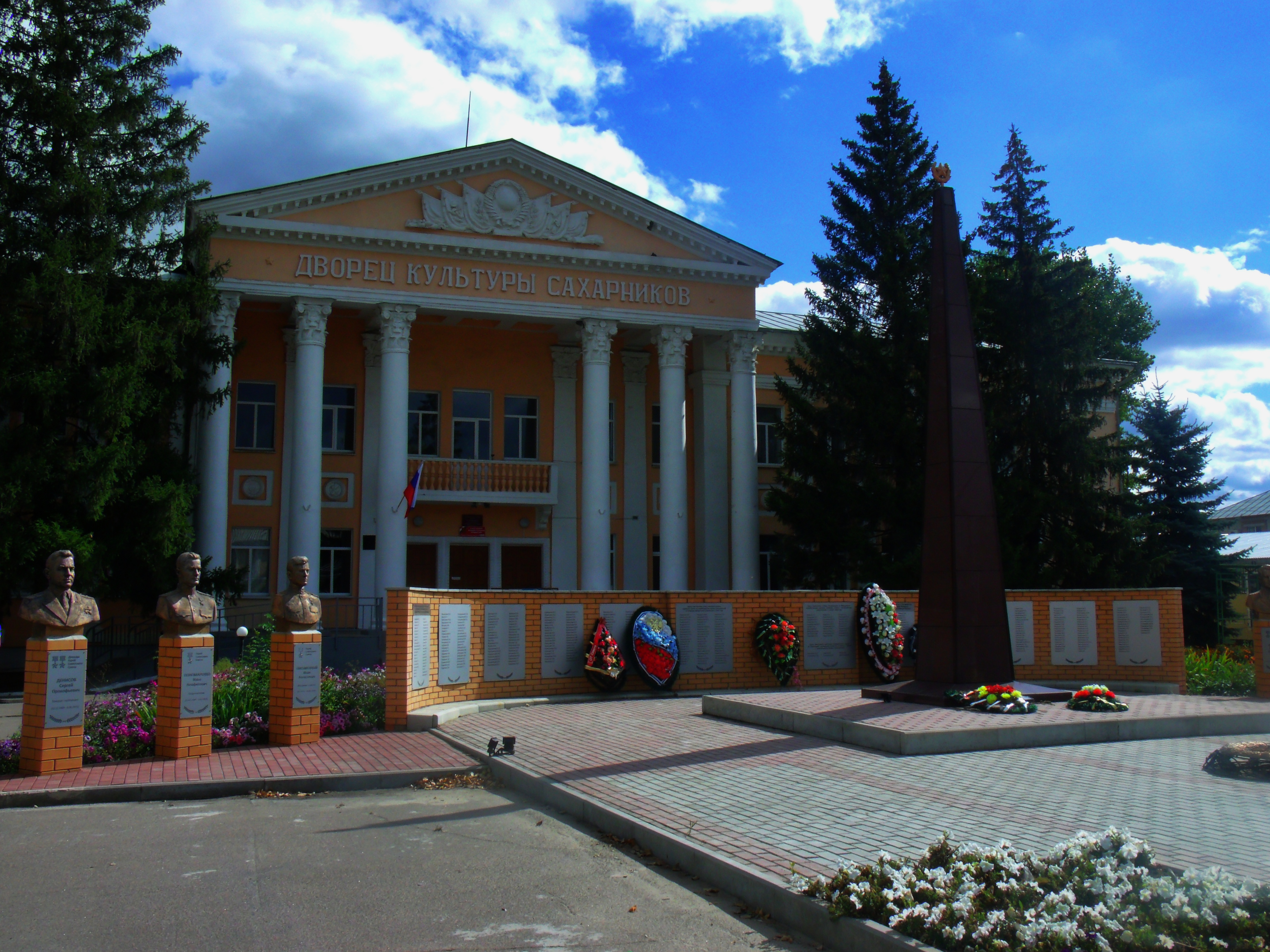
- Soldier's Memorial, Olkhovatka

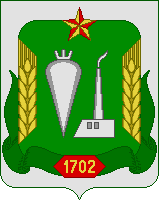
- Coat of arms
- Interactive map of Ol'khovatka
- Location of Ol'khovatka Ol'khovatka (Voronezh Oblast)
- Coordinates: 50.2811°N 39.3037°E
- Country: Russia
- Federal subject: Voronezh Oblast
- Administrative district: Olkhovatsky District
- Founded: 1702

Population (2010 Census)
  - Total: 3,806
  - Estimate (2021): 3,276 (−13.9%)
- Time zone: UTC+3 (MSK)
- Postal code: 396670
- OKTMO ID: 20629151051

Ol'khovatka (Russian: Ольхова́тка) is an urban locality (an urban-type settlement) in Olkhovatsky District of Voronezh Oblast, Russia. Population: 3,276 (2021 census); 3,806 (2010 census); 4,424 (2002 census); 4,333 (1989 Soviet census).
