= Podgorensky (urban-type settlement) =

Podgorensky Подгоренский
- "urban-type settlement"
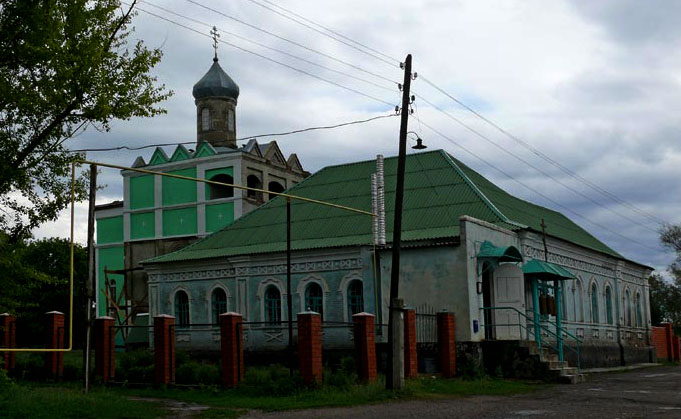

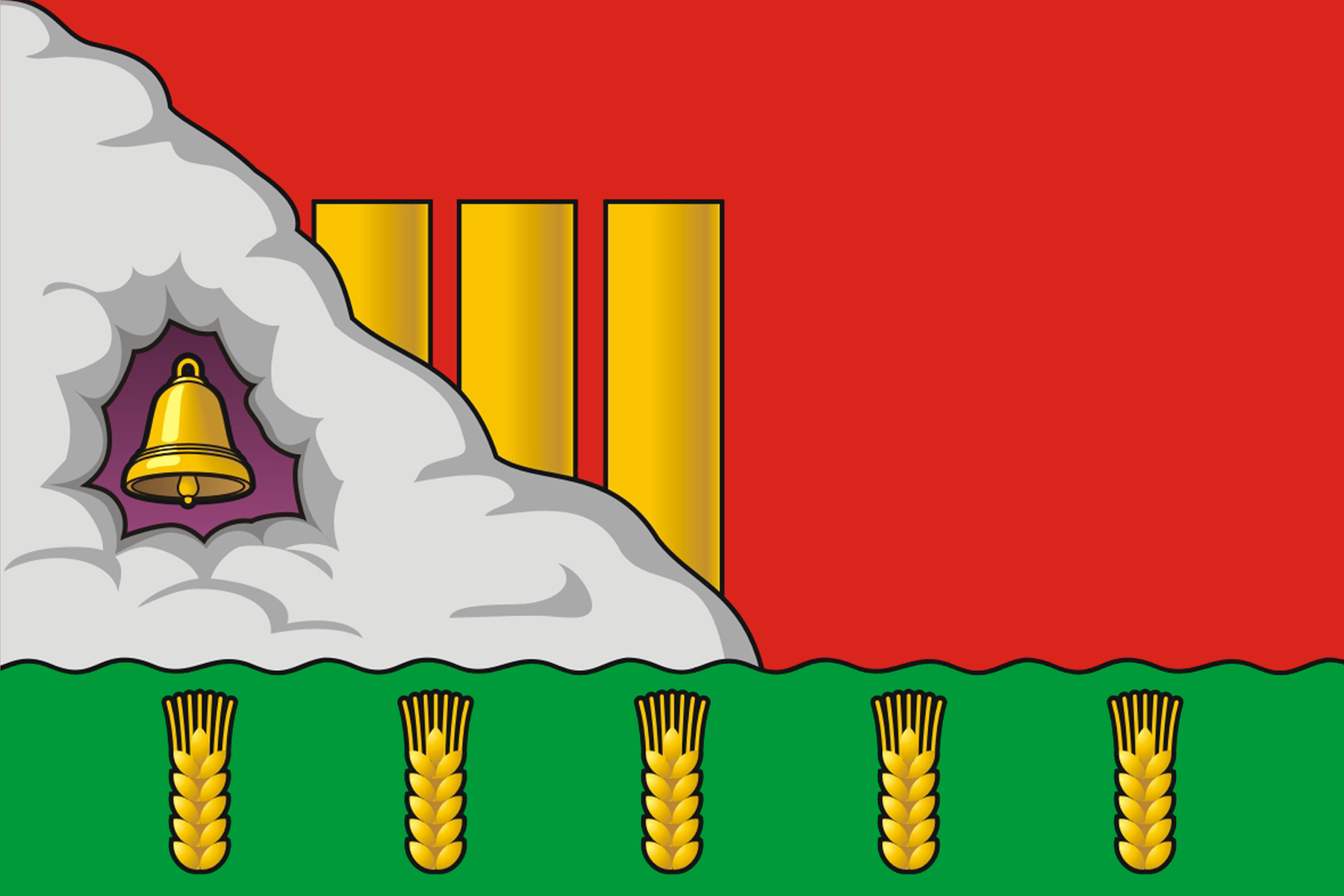
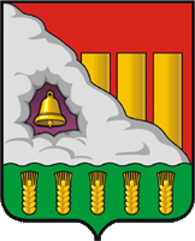
- Flag Coat of arms
- Interactive map of Podgorensky
- Location of Podgorensky Podgorensky (Voronezh Oblast)
- Coordinates: 50°24′N 39°29′E
- Country: Russia
- Federal subject: Voronezh Oblast
- Administrative district: Podgorensky District
- Founded: 1740

Population (2010 Census)
  - Total: 6,136
  - Estimate (2021): 5,732 (−6.6%)

Administrative status
  - Capital of: Podgorensky District
- Time zone: UTC+3 (MSK)
- Postal code: 396560
- OKTMO ID: 20641151051

Podgorensky (Russian: Подго́ренский) is an urban locality (an urban-type settlement) and the administrative center of Podgorensky District of Voronezh Oblast, Russia. Population: 5,732 (2021 census); 6,136 (2010 census); 6,745 (2002 census); 7,083 (1989 Soviet census).

== History ==
A cement plant was built in Podgorensky in 1932 during the first Five Year Plan. In the 1950s and 1960s it underwent a major overhaul increasing its annual capacity to 612 thousand tons.
