= Olkhovatsky District =

Olkhovatsky District Ольховатский район (Russian)
- District
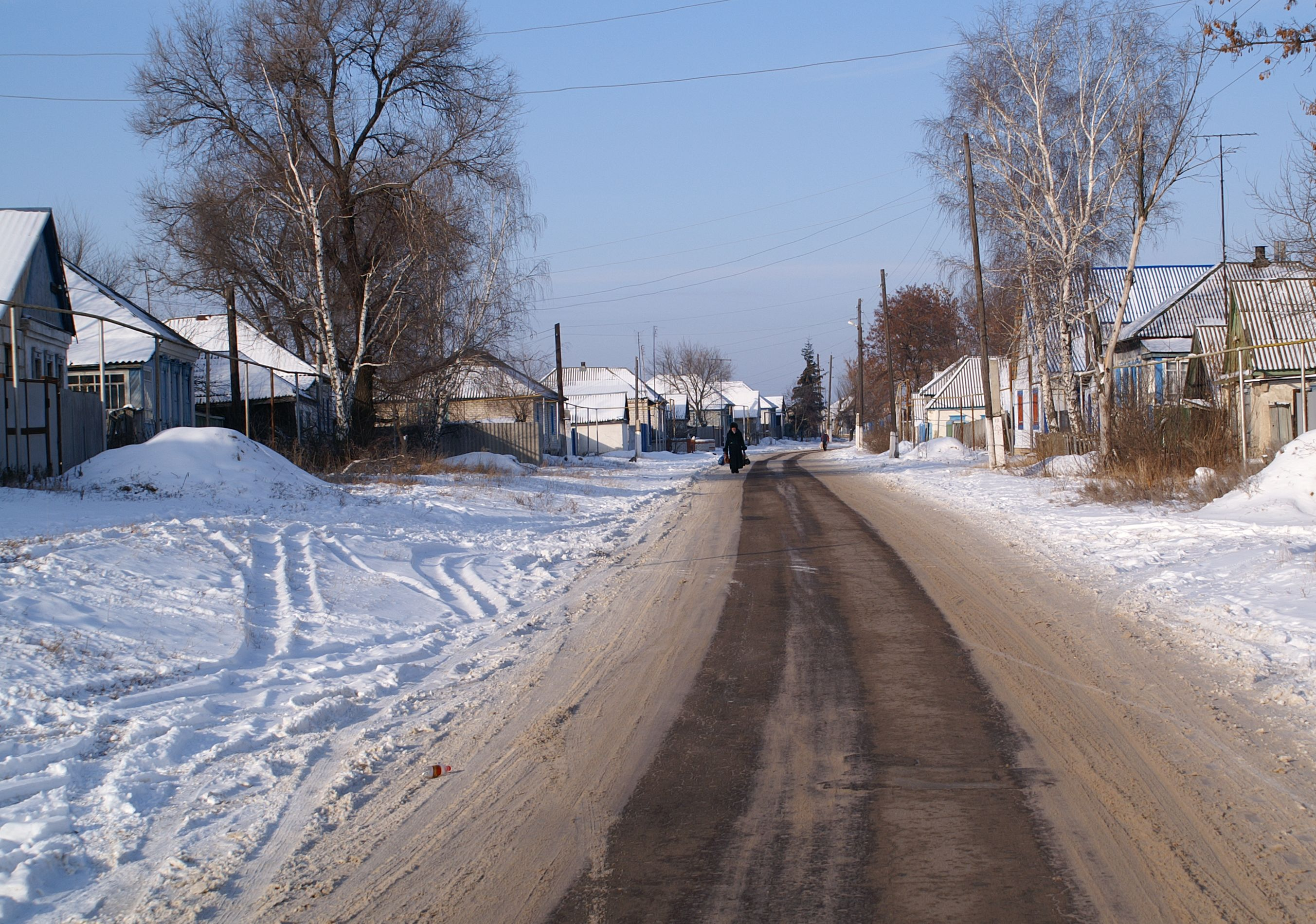
- Village of Shaposhnikova, Okkhovatsky District

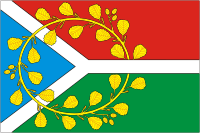
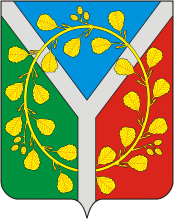
- Flag Coat of arms
- Location of Olkhovatsky District in Voronezh Oblast
- Coordinates: 50°17′10″N 39°17′52″E
- Country: Russia
- Federal subject: Voronezh Oblast
- Established: 30 July 1928
- Administrative center: Olkhovatka

Area
  - Total: 1,045 km^{2} (403 sq mi)

Population (2010 Census)
  - Total: 24,218
  - Density: 23.18/km^{2} (60.02/sq mi)
  - Urban: 15.7%
  - Rural: 84.3%

Administrative structure
  - Administrative divisions: 1 Urban settlements, 7 Rural settlements
  - Inhabited localities: 1 urban-type settlements, 53 rural localities

Municipal structure
  - Municipally incorporated as: Olkhovatsky Municipal District
  - Municipal divisions: 1 urban settlements, 7 rural settlements
- Time zone: UTC+3 (MSK)
- OKTMO ID: 20629000
- Website: http://olhadmin.ru/

Olkhovatsky District (Russian: Ольхова́тский райо́н) is an administrative and municipal district (raion), one of the thirty-two in Voronezh Oblast, Russia. It is located in the southwest of the oblast. The area of the district is 1,045 square kilometers (403 sq mi). Its administrative center is the urban locality (a work settlement) of Olkhovatka. Population: 21,565 (2021 census); 24,218 (2010 census); 25,841 (2002 census); 26,386 (1989 Soviet census). The population of Olkhovatka accounts for 15.2% of the district's total population.
