= 232nd Rifle Division =

- Active: June – 27 December 1941; December 1941 – July 1945
- Country: Soviet Union
- Branch: Red Army
- Type: Infantry
- Size: Division
- Engagements: Operation Barbarossa; Battle of Smolensk (1941); Battle of Kiev (1941); Case Blue; Voronezh–Kharkov offensive Third Battle of Kharkov; Belgorod–Kharkov offensive operation Battle of the Dniepr; Battle of Kiev (1943); Zhitomir–Berdichev offensive Uman–Botoșani offensive First Jassy–Kishinev offensive Second Jassy–Kishinev offensive Battle of Debrecen; Budapest offensive Western Carpathian offensive Bratislava–Brno offensive
- Decorations: Order of Lenin; Order of the Red Banner; Order of Suvorov; Order of Bogdan Khmelnitsky
- Battle honours: Sumy; Kyiv (All decorations and honors 2nd Formation)

Commanders
- Notable commanders: Maj. Gen. Semyon Ivanovich Nedvigin; Maj. Gen. Ivan Ilich Ulitin; Maj. Gen. Maksim Evseevich Kozyr; Col. Dionisii Semyonovich Tsalai

The 232nd Rifle Division was an infantry division of the Red Army, originally formed in the weeks just before the start of the German invasion, based on the shtat (table of organization and equipment) of September 13, 1939. It was quickly moved to the fighting front as part of the 66th Rifle Corps in 21st Army, and it remained in this Corps for its brief existence. 21st Army was deployed in western Belarus, attempting to plug the gaps created by the defeats of the border armies in the first weeks of Barbarossa, and the division made a deep penetration into the German rear in the eastern fringes of the Pripet Marshes, but this was ultimately unsustainable. By early September, the 232nd was greatly depleted due to almost continual combat, before being encircled and destroyed east of Kyiv.

A new division began forming in December in the Altaisk region of Siberia. Initially numbered as the 453rd, it was soon redesignated as the 232nd. After preliminary organization, it moved west to the Moscow area and was assigned to two different reserve armies before joining the fighting as part of 60th Army near Voronezh in July 1942. It remained defending along the Don river until early in the new year, when it took part in the liberation of that city and the defeat of the German and Hungarian 2nd Armies near Kastornoye. The division saw only limited action in the Battle of Kursk as part of the 50th Rifle Corps; it would serve as part of either this or the 51st Rifle Corps almost continually for the duration of the war. After this battle it advanced through eastern Ukraine, winning two battle honors and, within quick succession, four decorations for its part in the battles for Kyiv and the following advance on Romania in the spring of 1944. After being transferred to the 40th Army it was halted in eastern Romania in May before resuming its advance in August. It entered Hungary in October, and its subunits also gained recognition in the fighting that took place through the winter. In early 1945 the 232nd pushed on through Slovakia to end the war near Brno. Despite a distinguished record, it was disbanded in July 1945.

== 1st Formation ==
The division began forming in early June 1941 in the Kharkov Military District. As of June 22 it officially had the following order of battle:

- 764th Rifle Regiment
- 793rd Rifle Regiment
- 797th Rifle Regiment
- 676th Light Artillery Regiment
- 708th Howitzer Artillery Regiment
- 23rd Antitank Battalion
- 286th Self-propelled Artillery Battalion
- 303rd Reconnaissance Battalion
- 392nd Sapper Battalion
- 698th Signal Battalion
- 377th Medical/Sanitation Battalion
- 323rd Chemical Defense (Anti-gas) Company
- 692nd Motor Transport Battalion
- 349th Field Bakery
- 658th Field Postal Station
- 525th Field Office of the State Bank

While the process of forming may have begun as early as March the division's first official commander, Maj. Gen. Semyon Ivanovich Nedvigin, was not appointed until July 1, just one day before it entered the active army. Given a report from July 23 stating that the division had no howitzers on strength at all on that date, it's possible that the howitzer regiment was never actually formed. The self-propelled artillery battalion was non-standard; the Red Army had very few such vehicles at the time, one of the few types being the ZiS-30. Nedvigin had previously served as deputy commander and later commander of the 75th Rifle Division, and he would lead the 232nd until it was effectively destroyed in September.

=== Battles in Belarus ===
As of June 22 the 232nd was assigned to the 45th Rifle Corps, unattached to any Army, in the Reserve of the Supreme High Command, but by July 1 it had been reassigned to the 66th Rifle Corps of 21st Army, which was part of the STAVKA Group of Reserve Armies. On July 2, as the division joined the fighting, Marshal S. K. Timoshenko took over command of Western Front, which included the 21st, which would soon be led by Col. Gen. F. I. Kuznetsov. The Army, which was anchoring the Front's southern flank, launched a partially-successful reconnaissance-in-force on July 5, and then a series of resolute and somewhat effective counterattacks against the right flank of 2nd Panzer Group in the area of Rahachow and Zhlobin. As of July 10 the 232nd was the only division remaining under command of 66th Corps.

Given its successes to date, on July 11 Timoshenko ordered Kuznetsov to "tie down the operations of the enemy and force him to fear the possibilities of our attacks" by dispatching "mobile detachments with sappers, antitank guns, and tank destroyer commands for operations in the direction of Zborovo, Chigirinka, Gorodishche, Zhlobin, Parichi and Bobruisk". These detachments were to destroy German tanks and disorganize the rear through "the destruction of transport, communications, radio transmitters, warehouses, and so forth, the destruction of supply routes, and the emplacement of mine traps." In addition, Timoshenko wanted Kuznetsov to "prepare an operation and keep units in readiness for a surprise seizure of Bobruisk and Parichi." At 0241 hours on July 13 Kuznetsov ordered his Army to expand its offensive by conducting an assault against 2nd Panzer Group's right wing in the Bykhaw region jointly with 4th Army. 66th Corps, which now also contained the 75th Division plus the 51st and 52nd Armored Trains, was directed to defend the east bank of the Lan River with the 75th and attack along the west bank of the Berezina with its main forces, recapture Babruysk, prevent the advance of German reserves toward that place while destroying German forces in piecemeal fashion. The 232nd was to jump off from Yakimovskoe and Strakovichi.

The attack began the same day and, in conjunction with the rest of the Army the 66th Corps crossed the Dniepr between Rechytsa and Loyew and struck the defenses of the forward elements of 2nd Army's XII Army Corps and began exploiting northwestward toward Babruysk deep in the German rear. The 232nd made an impressive advance of 80km to the west, capturing bridges over the Berezina and Ptsich Rivers; it was reported at 2000 hours on July 18 as fighting along the Borovaia, Korolev Station, and Sloboda line, 15-22km northwest of Parichi and 20-25km south of Babruysk. This set the stage for a deep cavalry raid by a group of three divisions led by Col. Gen. O. I. Gorodovikov, but this proved only partially successful. The 232nd was eventually contained by the 112th Infantry Division, which Army Group Center was forced to commit from reserve. Meanwhile the Army's 63rd Rifle Corps managed to liberate Rahachow and Zhlobin, although this success was reversed within a week. The series of counterattacks by 21st Army were such a serious threat to 2nd Panzer Group's right flank that the Army Group was also forced to intervene with two divisions of the reserve XXXXIII Army Corps. The absence of these infantry divisions would soon be felt in the fighting around Smolensk.

Western Front's situation report at 0800 hours on July 21 stated in part that the 232nd was defending against the 131st and 134th Infantry Divisions, with the 797th Rifle Regiment protecting the Chernye Brody, Protasy, and Ugly sector, from 25km west of Parichi to 15km southwest of the same place. While Timoshenko's offensive had largely failed, those units like the 232nd who had scored successes were expected to hold out "like Red louses under the German's hide" until reinforced. Further to the division's strength return of July 23 it was reported that, in terms of heavier weapons, it had 18 76 mm regimental guns, 25 76 mm cannon, no howitzers and no 120 mm mortars. On the same date the new Central Front was formed and 66th Corps was assigned to it, becoming part of the reconstituted 3rd Army by August 1.

=== Battle of Kyiv ===
Toward the end of August the 66th Corps returned to 21st Army, which was now part of Bryansk Front, formed on August 16. In a preliminary to the drive that would eventually encircle Kyiv the XXIV Motorized Corps was advancing toward Konotop and Hlukhiv at this time. On August 27 the Army, which was operating along the western flank of this penetration, reported that the 232nd and 75th Divisions were jointly defending the Gornostaevka Station, Iankovka and Skitok line, 65-70km north and northwest of Chernihiv. Meanwhile the Army's main forces were trying to reestablish contact with 13th Army to the northeast. The next day the Army commander, Lt. Gen. V. I. Kuznetsov, was chided by STAVKA representative Marshal B. M. Shaposhnikov for failing to commit 66th Corps to this effort. At this time the Corps also contained the 55th and 266th Rifle Divisions and, as it was his strongest formation, Kuznetsov decided he had to employ it to defend the vital Chernihiv region against the advancing 2nd Army.

Kuznetsov issued orders on August 29 to his Army in which he described the mission of 66th Corps:

... defend the Borovichi Station, Kamka, Petrovka, Dubrovnoe, and Burovka line [north of Chernigov] and relieve the cavalry group in the Zaimishche and Novye Milny sector... The Commanders of 28th and 66th RCs - prepare stout defenses, with platoon-size trenches and antitank positions, employ regimental and divisional artillery in the infantry's forward positions, and organize coordination with the artillery.

55th Division was in the Snovsk area, the 75th near Berezna, with the 232nd in the space between these two towns, but all three were being forced back to the south and southeast under pressure from XXXXIII Army Corps. Despite the situation on the ground, Bryansk Front continued to issue utterly unrealistic orders for 13th and 21st Armies to go over to the counterattack. By now a 20km-wide gap had opened between the two Armies and the hastily organized 40th Army was proving unable to fill it. By the end of August 30 the remnants of the 232nd and the 75th were reported as "fighting fiercely" at Politichi and Chudovka. Later that day Kuznetsov stated that the division had relieved the cavalry group and occupied Novyi Mlyny and Iaskovo while repelling an attack by two German infantry regiments.

On September 1, General Nedvigin was seriously injured in an automobile accident and left the division; after his recovery he joined the training establishment for the balance of the war. No new commander was officially appointed before the division was disbanded. The next day it was still holding at Novyi Mlyny and Iaskovo. By now the 2nd Panzer Group was driving south to link up with 1st Panzer Group advancing to the north and the entire group of Soviet forces east of Kyiv, primarily Southwestern Front, was faced with encirclement. 21st Army was coming under increasing pressure from 2nd Army and was hard pressed to retain its hold on the Chernihiv area. On September 6 what remained of the division was reassigned, along with the rest of its Army, to Southwestern Front, but ten days later the two panzer groups linked up, completing the encirclement. Within days the 232nd had ceased to exist although in common with many of the divisions destroyed in this battle it officially remained on the books until December 27.

== 2nd Formation ==
Earlier in December a new division, designated as the 453rd, began forming at Novosibirsk in the Siberian Military District. It was soon redesignated as the 2nd formation of the 232nd. Unusually, its initial order of battle was quite different from that of the 1st formation in the designations of its regiments, but this was changed on June 29, 1943 to conform with the original:

- First OoB -
  - 498th Rifle Regiment
  - 605th Rifle Regiment
  - 712th Rifle Regiment
  - 425th Artillery Regiment
- Second OoB -
  - 764th Rifle Regiment
  - 793rd Rifle Regiment
  - 797th Rifle Regiment
  - 676th Artillery Regiment
  - 214th Antitank Battalion
  - 499th Reconnaissance Company
  - 392nd Sapper Battalion (later 237th)
  - 608th Signal Battalion (later 296th Signal Battalion, 693rd Signal Company)
  - 238th Medical/Sanitation Battalion
  - 323rd Chemical Defense (Anti-gas) Company (later 42nd)
  - 587th Motor Transport Company
  - 440th Field Bakery
  - 905th Divisional Veterinary Hospital
  - 1700th Field Postal Station
  - 1070th Field Office of the State Bank

Lt. Col. Ivan Ilich Ulitin was appointed to command on March 1, 1942; this officer had previously commanded the 41st Rifle Regiment of the 84th Rifle Division. He would be promoted to the rank of colonel on September 23 and to major general on February 4, 1943. Since it was formed in Siberia the 232nd was commonly referred to as a "Siberian" division but this was never an official part of its divisional title. In May its personnel would be noted as being 60 percent Russian, 30 percent Cossack, and 10 percent Azerbaijani.

=== Fighting Along the Don ===
In April the division was moved west to the Moscow area where it was eventually assigned to the 3rd Reserve Army in the Reserve of the Supreme High Command. By the beginning of July it had been transferred to 6th Reserve Army but three days later when it reached the fighting front it was back in 3rd Reserve, which was redesignated as 60th Army, part of Voronezh Front, on July 10. As the XXIV Panzer Corps pushed east toward Voronezh the 232nd took up defensive positions along the Don river north of the city. Through the remainder of 1942 it fought defensive battles in this area, gaining and holding an important bridgehead at Gubaryovo in August.

=== Voronezh–Kharkov Offensive ===
On January 13, 1943 the Voronezh Front launched the Ostrogozhsk–Rossosh offensive with its left flank and center forces. The success of 40th Army's advance led to the creation of the Voronezh salient, roughly 130km wide at its base and 100 km deep from there to its tip at Voronezh itself. Centered on Kastornoye and Gorshechnoye it was defended by the German 2nd and Hungarian 2nd Armies, both of which were weak in numbers and especially in armor; on the other hand its northern and eastern faces had been fortified over the previous six months. For the new offensive the salient would be attacked from the north by Bryansk Front's 13th Army while Voronezh Front's 60th, 40th and 38th Armies struck the east and south.

By January 19 the Axis Ostrogozhsk–Rossosh grouping had been encircled and was being mopped up but 60th Army, with five divisions (100th, 121st, 206th, 232nd and 303rd) and the 104th Rifle Brigade, remained defending along a 60km front from Olkhovatka to Voronezh to Kremenchug. Each division had between 5,000-6,000 personnel on strength. They were facing the German 88th, 323rd (minus one regiment) and 75th Infantry Divisions. After a regrouping the commander of 60th Army, Maj. Gen. I. D. Chernyakhovsky, formed a shock group consisting of the 141st, 322nd, 232nd and 303rd Divisions, the 253rd Rifle Brigade, a tank destruction brigade and three tank brigades. This was to attack along the 22km-wide sector from Rudkino to Semidesyatskoye along the Nizhnyaya Veduga axis with the objective of linking up with 38th Army and encircling the forces defending the eastern part of the salient. The 232nd was in first echelon on a 5km-wide zone with the 303rd in second echelon ready to develop the success of it and the 322nd. The shock group was expected to penetrate 10-24km on the first day.

At 1000 hours on January 25, following an hour-long artillery preparation, the shock group attacked. The preparation did not yield the anticipated results and the defense was not fully suppressed. The fighting throughout the day was waged, for the most part, for the strongpoints along the forward edge of the defense; some of these were encircled by elements of the 232nd and 322nd during the afternoon but continued to hold out. As a result the two divisions gained only 2-3km during the day. Coordination between infantry and tank support was poor and led to significant tank losses. The offensive was renewed the next morning with heavy fighting for the holdout strongpoints, which were finally cleared as a result of close combat overnight. By dawn on the 27th the shock group had reached a line from Ivanovka to Medvezhinskii and although up to 1,500 German officers and soldiers had been killed and small groups were falling back to the northwest the shock group was still well short of its planned objectives.

==== Battle for the Pocket ====
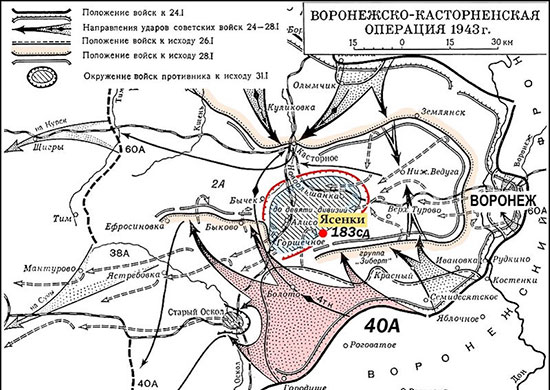
Voronezh–Kastornoye Offensive

Kastornoye was reached on January 28 and captured the next day, completing the encirclement of eight German and two Hungarian divisions. 38th and 40th Armies were assigned the task of clearing the pocket while the remaining Armies continued advancing westward. On January 30 the 232nd captured Protochnyi and Afonino before, in a further regrouping, the division was transferred to the 38th. The clearing operation was expected to take two or three days after which the two Armies would redeploy to lines for a subsequent offensive toward Oboyan and Kharkiv. A single weakened rifle regiment of 40th Army's 25th Guards Rifle Division was left to defend the Gorshechnoye area, which was an obvious escape route for the trapped forces. As the Guards' situation deteriorated the 206th Division was rushed up to reinforce it, Meanwhile, the 232nd the 253rd Brigade were pulled out of the fighting and concentrated in the Olym area; they were soon ordered to move up to the line Yastrebovka–Teplyi Kolodez by the end of February 1. In the event these orders were not received and the two formations remained near Olym throughout the day.

The fighting to destroy the pocketed forces would continue until February 17. A breakout effort to the west and southwest, organized in three columns, began overnight on February 1/2. The 232nd and the 253rd moved to the Zhernovets–Nazarovka area on the 2nd prior to receiving orders to advance to the Yefrosinovka by the end of February 4 to help block the northern (Siebert) and central (Bruchmann) columns. The next day the Bruchmann group (roughly 9,000 men of three German and two Hungarian divisions) managed to break out through the 25th Guards and reached as far as Shlyakhovaya and height 218 before being halted by two regiments of the 232nd near Golovishcha. Stymied, the Bruchmann group began moving in the direction of Yastrebovka, but this was also blocked by units of the division in cooperation with the 25th Guards. Late that evening the task of defeating the encircled forces was finally entrusted to 38th Army alone, and the 232nd was assigned to defeat the Bruchmann group along the line from Srednee Dorozhnoye to Golovishcha.

Operations through February 6-7 took place in blizzard conditions; roads were covered with snow and visibility was extremely limited. This aided the breakout efforts and while the 232nd held its line through the first day, overnight it was pushed back to Zaoskole. The next day the desperate Axis troops, which now included the Seibert group, drove the division out of this village while also occupying Yefrosinovka and the eastern part of Yastrebovka. By the day's end it was occupying Kuliga and Razbiraevka with one rifle regiment and the western part of Yastrebovka and Bolshie Butyrki with the other two. Altogether the escaping groups had managed to advance 15-30km to the west in two days. The blocking divisions (167th, 232nd, 237th and 240th) were ordered to prevent them reaching Tim and Manturovo, while holding their present lines.

The weather did not abate until February 10. During February 8 the Axis forces pushed back units of the 237th and 232nd Divisions while not yet achieving a breakthrough. That day as well the 60th Army liberated Kursk and 40th Army reached Belgorod, which was cleared on February 9. On that day the main body of the "mobile pocket" made further advances against the positions of the 232nd and 167th Divisions; the Seibert group was now getting into the division's rear while the Bruchmann group was pushing it back to the north. Fearing they might be encircled themselves General Ulitin ordered his men to pull back to the north in the area of Ostanino and then Repets, giving the Axis groups a clear path to reach Manturovo and then Solntsevo. While Ulitin was criticised for this the main blame fell on the Army commander, Maj. Gen. N. E. Chibisov, for failing to maintain adequate communications, plus the indecisive nature of the pursuit by the Army's main forces.

In his orders for February 10 Ulitin was directed to capture Repetskaya Plota by day's end while the 167th took Ostanino and the remainder of the Army continued its pursuit. The two divisions accomplished these limited objectives while also putting themselves in order. Overnight on February 11/12 the 240th left Tim and occupied Belyi and Subbotino, cutting off the Bruchmann group, which was largely destroyed. By the end of February 12 the 232nd had reached Krivetskoye (or possibly the Lapukhinka–Arkhangelskoye area). Meanwhile, most of the remainder of the Axis forces reached Oboyan where they prepared to defend. General Chibisov now ordered his forces to encircle and destroy the Axis garrison of that town in preparation for a renewed offensive on Sumy, 100 km to the southwest. By the end of February 16 Oboyan was already partly encircled by three rifle divisions and a brigade. Chibisov planned to take the town in an attack from three sides on February 18 but on the day before, anticipating the attack, the Axis garrison staged a hasty retreat. In the end only a few thousand men of the original encircled Axis force managed to escape.

=== Battle of Kursk ===
German plan of attack at Kursk. The position of 38th Army is shown in the southwest corner of the salient.

By the end of February Army Group South was well into its counteroffensive but this did not directly threaten 38th Army before it shut down in mid-March. On April 28 Lt. Col. Georgii Semyonovich Vasiliev, the former commander of the 605th Rifle Regiment, posthumously became the division's first Hero of the Soviet Union. In the early days of the Kastornoye operation he had led his troops in the liberation of several villages as the pocket was being formed, including Kochetovka, where he personally directed the hand-to-hand combat that cleared it, before he was killed in action on January 28 in the fighting for Nizhneye Turovo.

In early May the STAVKA made its decision to stand on the defensive within the Kursk salient which was occupied by the Central and Voronezh Fronts. The new commander of the latter, Army Gen. N. F. Vatutin, reported as follows on May 11:

The forces of the Voronezh Front are ready to carry out their defensive assignments. All of the rifle divisions of the 38th, 40th, 6th Guards and 7th Guards Armies, with very few exceptions, each have 8,000 or more men... The main portion of arms has arrived by railroad in the last few days. Thus the bulk of the weapons will be issued to the troops by the end of 14.5.1943.

38th Army, still under command of General Chibisov, was assigned a front 80km wide between 40th Army and the boundary with Central Front. At the outset of the battle the 232nd was assigned to 50th Rifle Corps with the 167th and 340th Rifle Divisions, all of which were in the Army's first echelon. The division manned, apart from other defenses, an antitank strongpoint consisting of 24 antitank rifles. In the event, since the main attack of Army Group South fell on the positions of the 6th and 7th Guards Armies well to the east, the 38th Army saw little action during Operation Zitadelle. Having been stripped of one rifle division and both tank brigades during this fighting it was not in a position to take part in the first stages of Operation Polkovodets Rumyantsev but finally began advancing in late August. It soon shared a battle honor with the 167th and 340th Divisions:

SUMY... 232nd Rifle Division (Major General Ulitin, Ivan Ilich)... The troops who participated in the liberation of Sumy, by the order of the Supreme High Command of 2 September 1943, and a commendation in Moscow, are given a salute of 12 artillery salvoes from 124 guns.

Later in the month the division left 50th Corps and came under direct Army command.

=== Battles for Kyiv ===
By September 9 the 38th Army was attacking along the Kyiv axis, preparing to force the Dniepr immediately south of the city. However, when its forces were already only two to three marches from the river Vatutin ordered Chibisov to regroup to his right wing so as to instead make its crossing north of Kyiv. The Army was tasked with creating a bridgehead, reaching as far as the Irpin River, while also destroying the German east bank bridgehead at Darnitsa. The four divisions of 51st Corps were to make the crossing while 50th Corps operated against Darnitsa; the 232nd linked the two Corps along a line from Pukhovka on the Desna River to Bolshaya Dymerka. At this time the division's strength was reported as 7,138 personnel, armed with 28 82 mm and 14 120 mm mortars; ten 76 mm regimental guns and 19 76 mm cannon; plus ten 122 mm howitzers and one captured 105 mm gun-howitzer.

50th Corps began the attack on the Darnitsa position on September 23 but stubborn fighting continued until the 28th when the German forces completed their evacuation to the west bank. 38th Army had left most of its crossing equipment well to the rear, so was forced to rely on improvised means. 51st Corps reached the Dniepr on September 25 and overnight the first crossing was attempted but this was repulsed by artillery and small arms fire. By the end of the 26th the reconnaissance company of the 180th Rifle Division had got over while one battalion of the 167th occupied a midstream island near Vyshhorod but crossing efforts remained slow until September 29. Meanwhile the 232nd remained in its previous positions as the Army's reserve.

At this point the STAVKA issued a new directive for the Front's operations on the west bank in order to envelop Kyiv from the north, west and south. 38th Army would launch the main attack from the north with five divisions, and a supporting attack with three divisions south of the city toward Zhuliany. The objective was to liberate the city on October 7. Two divisions of 50th Corps managed to cross south of the city on October 2-3 but 51st Corps made little progress expanding its northern bridgehead and the deadline passed. Voronezh Front (as of October 20 1st Ukrainian Front) was reinforced late on October 5 with the 13th and 60th Armies from Central Front. This brought the Lyutizh bridgehead within the Front's boundaries. The Army attacked from October 6-10 to expand this bridgehead but with scant success. Later in the month the 232nd returned to 50th Corps in a substantially reinforced 38th Army. On October 27 Chibisov handed the Army over to Col. Gen. K. S. Moskalenko.

==== Liberation of Kyiv ====
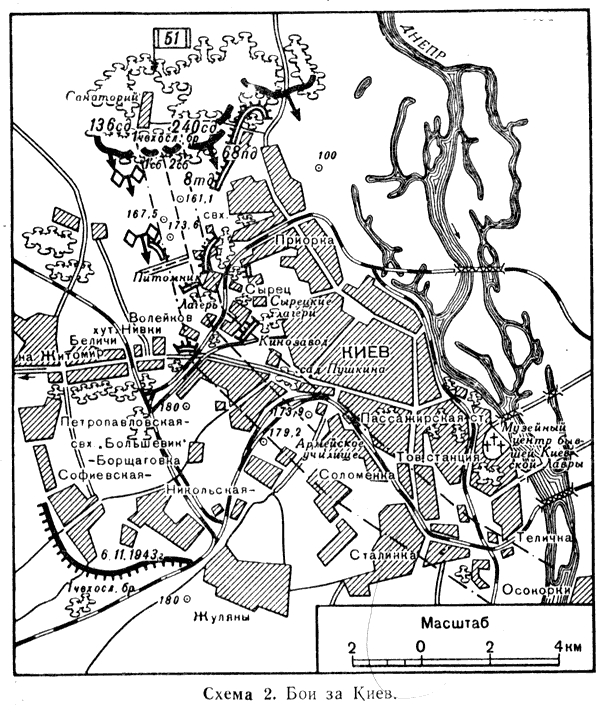
Soviet map of Kiev (1943)

A significant regrouping took place in late October as the STAVKA gave up on efforts to break out of the bridgehead at Bukryn, south of Kyiv; among other measures the 3rd Guards Tank Army was to move north to join the 38th and 60th Armies in breaking out of the Lyutizh bridgehead. This flank of the offensive was to begin on November 3. The German defenses in front of 38th Army were generally simple but extended to a depth of up to 14km. In order to break through these defenses Moskalenko concentrated his 50th and 51st Corps, backed by 5th Guards Tank Corps, along the 14km-wide sector from Moshchun to Vyshhorod with a shock group of two divisions of each Corps in the center (232nd, 167th, 136th and 240th) on a 6km front. The 232nd and 167th had the 39th Tank Regiment in direct support and were to attack in the direction of Dachi Pushcha-Voditsa and Berkovets, reaching Belichi station by the end of the first day. Subsequently they were to advance to Kostopalnaya by the end of the second day and to the line Veta Pochtovaya–Lesniki by the end of the fourth. The shock group was further supported by an average of 347.5 guns and mortars (76mm+ calibre) per kilometre.

After the reading aloud of an order by Vatutin and Lt. Gen. N. S. Khrushchev to the troops, urging the storming of Kyiv, the artillery opened at 0800 hours for a 40-minute preparation. The infantry and armor advance began at 0840 and despite heavy fire resistance and counterattacks the shock group managed to gain 5-12km during the day. 50th Corps reached Dachi Pushcha-Voditsa after covering 7km. Much of the terrain was heavily wooded, which complicated the offensive, as did the presence of the 7th and 8th Panzer and 20th Motorized Divisions in immediate reserve. For November 4, Moskalenko directed 50th Corps to reach the line Mostyshche–Shevchenko–Bobritsa–Malyutyanka–Yankovichi while 51st Corps began entering the city itself. Through the day 38th Army gained an additional 5km in the face of significant armored counterattacks. On the next morning it became clear that a major withdrawal of German forces was underway and 50th Corps began clearing the western outskirts, apart from the 167th which was fighting in the city center. By 0400 hours on November 6 Kyiv had been cleared, and the 232nd received its second honorific:

KIEV... 232nd Rifle Division (Major General Ulitin, Ivan Ilich)... The troops who participated in the liberation of Kiev, by the order of the Supreme High Command of 6 November 1943, and a commendation in Moscow, are given a salute of 24 artillery salvoes from 324 guns.

Through the rest of the day 38th Army continued to develop the offensive to the south and advanced 20km; 50th Corps with 5th Guards Tanks reached from Hlevakha to Khodosovka and at day's end was out of contact with German forces. The following day the 5th Guards was removed from its support role to help form a mobile group to exploit toward Zhytomyr. This objective was to be reached by the end of November 9.

==== Defense of Fastiv ====
On November 7 the Army was directed to advance toward Bila Tserkva and it covered 6-12km, with 50th Corps reaching the Vasylkiv area, but this was considerably short of its assigned goals. The following day the Corps made greater progress, covering 14-24km, again in cooperation with 5th Guards Tanks. However, the 4th Panzer Army was now gathering reserves, including the new 25th Panzer and the 2nd SS Panzer Divisions, and these began counterattacking the 3rd Guards Tank Army. The situation was complicated by the inability of 50th Corps to reach Fastiv to relieve the tank army for more decisive operations.

At dawn on November 9 Vatutin ordered Moskalenko to take Zhytomyr by the end of the 12th. During the day the 232nd and 340th Divisions of 50th Corps, along with elements of 3rd Guards Tanks, fought off counterattacks in the Fastivets area. Despite losing 13 tanks destroyed the German forces captured that village by the end of the day; by now the four divisions of the Corps were spread across a frontage of 60km. The 232nd was now temporarily subordinated to 3rd Guards Tank Army and was ordered to take up defensive positions east and southeast of Fastiv, but it had only 200 riflemen and sappers on hand and its artillery was trailing to the rear. During the next day it was joined by the 340th in trying to restore the situation near Fastiv with the help of one brigade of the 9th Mechanized Corps. 4th Panzer Army was being led in this area by 25th Panzer and lead elements of 1st SS Panzer Divisions. On November 11 the division remained locked in defensive fighting near Fastivets.

By November 12 five panzer divisions had been concentrated along the Khodorkiv–Fastiv–Cherniakhiv sector. While Fastiv continued to come under attack the 232nd remained fighting in its previous positions. The STAVKA, alarmed by the situation, ordered Vatutin to reinforce 38th Army's left wing along the Fastiv–Trypillia line with artillery, tanks and engineers to prevent any breakthrough toward Kyiv. While the Army's right wing liberated Zhytomyr on this date, and 60th Army would take Korosten on the 17th, 1st Ukrainian Front was now forced over to the defense.

Frustrated at Fastiv, the German command moved its armored forces to the Zhytomyr and Kornyn axis by November 15. The fighting in this area continued for the remainder of the month, with the former city being retaken and the advance continuing to within 60km of Kyiv. On November 15 the 232nd was reported as having 5,573 personnel, with 91 guns and mortars of 76 mm+ calibre, including three trophy German 105 mm howitzers. The previous day it had been transferred to 40th Army, which had moved up from the Bukryn bridgehead. On November 28 General Ulitin was wounded and hospitalized. After his recovery in February 1944 he was sent to the Voroshilov Academy from which he graduated in March 1945. He went on to command the 71st and 5th Guards Rifle Divisions postwar before his retirement in 1957. He was replaced on December 4 by Maj. Gen. Maksim Evseevich Kozyr, who had previously led the 391st and 7th Guards Rifle Divisions. Later that month the division was transferred to 51st Corps; it would remain under these commands almost continuously for the duration of the war. On January 4, 1944 it was awarded the Order of the Red Banner.

=== Jassy-Kishinev Offensives ===
Uman–Botoșani Offensive. Note initial position of 40th Army.

During February 40th Army was transferred to 2nd Ukrainian Front, which was commanded by Marshal I. S. Konev. The Uman–Botoșani operation began on March 5 and the 232nd broke through the heavily fortified German line on the first day; within days it had liberated dozens of towns and villages while also killing or capturing several thousand German soldiers and capturing a large number of trophies. In recognition of these feats General Kozyr would be made a Hero of the Soviet Union on May 17, and the division itself was awarded the Order of Bogdan Khmelnitsky, 2nd Degree, on March 19 in recognition of its role in the liberation of Uman.

40th Army reached the Dniestr River and the border of Romania near Mohyliv-Podilskyi on the same date and the 232nd soon forced a crossing. Within days it took part in the capture of Bălți; for these two accomplishments it would be decorated with the Order of Suvorov, 2nd Degree, on April 8. On that date Konev designated the 40th and 27th Armies as his Front's shock group and ordered the two Armies to begin a coordinated advance southward along the Târgu Frumos axis in close cooperation with the lead elements of 2nd Tank Army. At this time the 51st Corps, commanded by Maj. Gen. P. P. Avdeenko, contained the 42nd Guards and 74th and 232nd Rifle Divisions and was operating on the Army's left wing.

==== First Jassy-Kishinev Offensive ====
The division had captured Botoșani on April 7, after having forced a crossing of the Prut River days earlier. The Romanian 8th Infantry Division was forced to withdraw to the south toward Târgu Neamț with the 232nd in close pursuit. This action would result in the award of the Order of Lenin on April 24, which was rarely given to regular rifle divisions. While the 52nd Army conducted diversionary operations along the Iași axis, Konev's shock group began its southward advance on the morning of April 8. 51st Corps lunged across the Sitna River north and south of Botoșani, 100 km northwest of Iași. To the east, the 35th Guards Rifle Corps of 27th Army also attacked to the south, driving the main forces of the Romanian division back towards the town of Hârlău, and the next day past that point which placed this Corps just 27km north of Târgu Frumos. All that separated the 27th Army from its objectives were the disorganized remnants of the Romanian 7th and 8th Divisions. By now, however, the Romanian 4th Army had managed to assemble enough forces to man the Strunga Defense Line from Târgu Neamț to just south of Iași.

Meanwhile the 51st Corps, led by the 42nd Guards, continued its advance. The Guardsmen captured Pașcani at midday while the 232nd closed up on the Romanian defenses north of Târgu Neamț. Forward elements of 2nd Tank Army were dueling with a battle group of the 24th Panzer Division north of Podu Iloaiei and were unable to support the infantry advance. The German 8th Army was already moving to counter the threat from 27th Army by moving the Großdeutschland Division from well east of Iași. During the afternoon this division's 52nd Assault Engineer Battalion launched a counterattack which managed to seize and hold a small foothold in the southern part of Târgu Frumos. Over the next two days the 35th Guards Corps was partially encircled and forced to fight its way back to the north. Over the following week, as the two sides jockeyed for position in the Târgu Frumos area, the 51st Corps probed Romanian defenses west of the Siret River. Late on April 12 the Romanian 8th and 6th Infantry Divisions were holding along a line from Târgu Neamț eastward to the river south of Pașcani. The 232nd, along with most of the 42nd Guards and supported by ten tanks with mounted infantry, attacked at dawn on the 13th. The assault struck security outposts at the village of Critești and drove them back to 8th Romanian's forward defenses at Timișești and Moțca, which in turn were attacked the next day. Although this attack was beaten back the Corps was reinforced with the 4th Guards Airborne Division on April 15 and a renewed effort carried both Moțca and Broșteni.

Following this success the Corps drove a further 5km to the south toward the villages of Boureni and Brătești where it ran into a full regiment of the Romanian 20th Mountain Infantry Division which was engaged in forming a new defensive line along a ridge between the Seret and Moldova Rivers. The Romanian command urgently requested assistance and, in response, a battle group of the 3rd SS Panzer Division was dispatched from the town of Roman to the south. Before it could intervene the commander of 40th Army, Lt. Gen. F. F. Zhmachenko, suspended the attacks on April 16, probably due to the failures of 27th Army to the east.

In order to revive the offensive Konev ordered a major regrouping of his forces beginning on April 23. 51st Corps, which now contained the 133rd Rifle Division, replacing the 74th, was concentrated in the sector west of Pașcani. For this new effort the Front was reinforced with the 7th Guards and 5th Guards Tank Armies. On April 24 elements of 27th and 52nd Armies launched several diversionary attacks near Iași which made negligible gains. At about the same time the German V Army Corps was carrying out a series of spoiling attacks, first near Pașcani and next north of Târgu Frumos. 3rd SS and the Romanian 6th Infantry struck south of Pașcani on the morning of the 24th against the 232nd and the 42nd Guards. After three days of intensive fighting over difficult terrain the two Soviet divisions were driven back to, and then north, of the town. Despite this success V Corps suspended its counterattack on April 28 and the situation stabilized.

Despite this setback Konev determined to press on, after adjusting his start dates. 40th Army would still be playing a supporting role by attacking north of Târgu Neamț and Pașcani in order to tie down Axis reserves. 51st Corps was to assault the defenses of 6th Romanian between Prăjescu and Timișești before exploiting southward along the west bank of the Prut. The attack finally began at dawn on May 2 but faltered almost immediately, at a cost of 89 men killed and 379 wounded. On May 7 the Front was ordered to go over to the defense.

==== Second Jassy-Kishinev Offensive ====
The division remained on the defensive in the same area until well into August. When the new offensive began on August 20 the 51st Corps had the 38th Rifle Division in place of the 133rd, and was again assigned a supporting role to attack from the area south and southwest of Pașcani in the general direction of Tupilați. 40th Army, still on the right (west) flank of the Front, saw only local fighting on the first three days, while the Front's shock groups crushed Axis resistance south of Iași and overcame the rear defensive line. At 1530 hours on August 23 the 232nd and 42nd Guards went over to the attack and by dusk were fighting along a line from Soch to Brătești and then as far to the east as the Siret. The remainder of the Army remained inactive that day, but was ordered to go over to the offensive on August 24, force the Moldova, and advance up to 16km, taking Tupilați in the process. In the event these goals were reached and even exceeded. By this time the bulk of the Axis forces had been destroyed or encircled and Romania had left the alliance.

=== Into Hungary and Slovakia ===
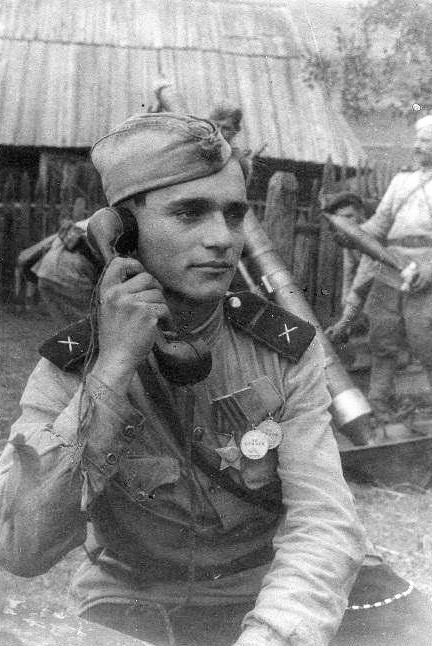
Signalman Aleksey Yemelyanovich Vorobyov of the 120 mm mortar battery of the 232nd's 797th Rife Regiment, killed in action in Hungary 1 December 1944

2nd Ukrainian Front, now under command of Marshal R. Ya. Malinovskii, was advancing into Hungary by October. During this month 40th Army was reduced to just four rifle divisions and a fortified region and the 232nd had returned to 50th Corps; the Army was still on the Army's right flank. During November the division returned to 51st Corps, which was now in 27th Army. These two Armies, plus the 53rd Army and Pliyev's Cavalry-Mechanized Group, were operating in Transylvania and eastern Hungary during this time. In the first days of the month the 27th Army was ordered to attack in the general direction of Miskolc. This was delayed by German counterattacks and did not actually get underway until December 2. During this delay General Kozyr was appointed as deputy commander of 50th Corps on November 26, and was replaced the next day by Col. Dionisii Semyonovich Tsalai, who would lead the division for the duration. Kozyr would be killed in action on April 24, 1945 near Brno when his car mistakenly drove beyond Soviet lines and came under German rifle fire. Several days later his body was recovered and was soon buried in the Olshansk Cemetery in Prague.

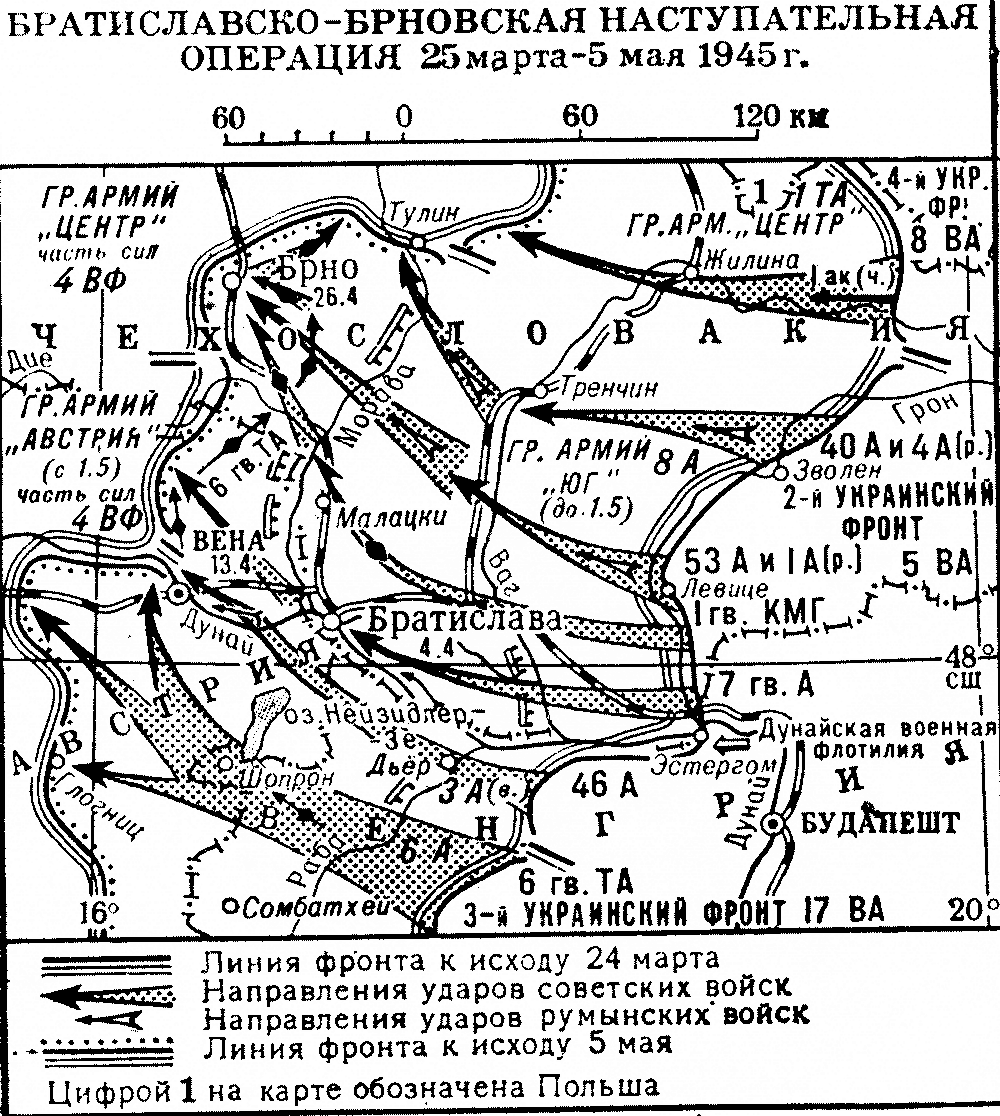
Bratislava-Brno Offensive. Note location of Zvolen (Зволен).

Miskolc was taken on December 3; the 764th Rifle Regiment received its name as a battle honor and on December 16 the 676th Artillery Regiment would be awarded the Order of Bogdan Khmelnitsky, 2nd Degree, for its role in this battle. During the month the 51st Corps came under direct command of the Front, but returned to 40th Army in January 1945. The Western Carpathian Offensive began on January 12 and in the third week of the month the Slovakian towns of Rožňava and Jelšava were taken; in recognition the 794th Rifle Regiment received the Order of the Red Banner on February 19. During the preparations for the Bratislava-Brno Offensive, on March 14 the 232nd played a leading role in the capture of the city of Zvolen and one regiment received a battle honor:

ZVOLEN... 797th Rifle Regiment (Lt. Colonel Aleksandrovich, Mikhail Frantsevich)... The troops who participated in the liberation of Zvolen, by the order of the Supreme High Command of 14 March 1945, and a commendation in Moscow, are given a salute of 12 artillery salvoes from 124 guns.

In addition, on April 5 the 764th Regiment would be given the Order of the Red Banner and the 794th received the Order of Suvorov, 3rd Degree, for their parts in the same battle.

As the offensive continued the city of Banská Bystrica was liberated on March 26 and one month later the 797th Regiment would be presented with the Order of Suvorov, 3rd Degree, while the 676th Artillery Regiment was given the Order of Kutuzov, 3rd Degree, for their parts in this victory. As of April 1 the division was under direct Army command but later in the month it returned to 51st Corps and ended the war under that command.

=== Postwar ===
The division ended the war near Brno. Its men and women shared the full title of 232nd Rifle, Sumy-Kiev, Order of Lenin, Order of the Red Banner, Orders of Suvorov and Bogdan Khmelnitsky Division. (Russian: 232-я стрелковая Сумско-Киевская ордена Ленина Краснознамённая орденов Суворова и Богдана Хмельницкого дивизия.) As a final distinction, on May 17 the 764th Regiment was awarded the Order of Suvorov, 3rd Degree, for its part in the fighting for Malacky. Despite this highly distinguished record, under the terms of STAVKA Order No. 11096 of May 29, 1945, part 8, the 232nd is listed as one of the rifle divisions to be "disbanded in place". It was disbanded in accordance with the directive in July.

== Legacy ==
A memorial south of Voronezh, atop the resting place of 969 Soviet soldiers, is dedicated to the 232nd Rifle Division and 18th Tank Corps for their defense of the Shilovo bridgehead.
