= Gremyachy =

Gremyachy (Russian: Гремячий; masculine); Gremyachaya or Gremyachya (Гремячая or Гремячья; feminine); Gremyacheye or Gremyachye (Гремячее or Гремячье; neuter) is the name of several rural localities in Russia:

- Gremyachy, Belgorod Oblast, a khutor in Shebekinsky District of Belgorod Oblast
- Gremyachy, Nizhny Novgorod Oblast, a settlement in Bolshebakaldsky Selsoviet of Buturlinsky District of Nizhny Novgorod Oblast
- Gremyachy, Oryol Oblast, a settlement in Stanovo-Kolodezsky Selsoviet of Orlovsky District of Oryol Oblast
- Gremyachy, Samara Oblast, a settlement in Syzransky District of Samara Oblast
- Gremyachy, Saratov Oblast, a settlement in Lysogorsky District of Saratov Oblast
- Gremyachy, Ulyanovsk Oblast, a settlement in Dmitriyevsky Rural Okrug of Radishchevsky District of Ulyanovsk Oblast
- Gremyachy, Alexeyevsky District, Volgograd Oblast, a khutor in Ryabovsky Selsoviet of Alexeyevsky District of Volgograd Oblast
- Gremyachy, Kalachyovsky District, Volgograd Oblast, a khutor in Pyatiizbyansky Selsoviet of Kalachyovsky District of Volgograd Oblast
- Gremyachy, Gryazovetsky District, Vologda Oblast, a settlement in Idsky Selsoviet of Gryazovetsky District of Vologda Oblast
- Gremyachy, Syamzhensky District, Vologda Oblast, a settlement in Ramensky Selsoviet of Syamzhensky District of Vologda Oblast
- Gremyachye, Belgorod Oblast, a selo in Korochansky District of Belgorod Oblast
- Gremyachye, Kaliningrad Oblast, a settlement in Kamensky Rural Okrug of Chernyakhovsky District of Kaliningrad Oblast
- Gremyachye, Oryol Oblast, a village in Berezovsky Selsoviet of Pokrovsky District of Oryol Oblast
- Gremyachye, Khokholsky District, Voronezh Oblast, a selo in Gremyachenskoye Rural Settlement of Khokholsky District of Voronezh Oblast
- Gremyachye, Ramonsky District, Voronezh Oblast, a selo in Pavlovskoye Rural Settlement of Ramonsky District of Voronezh Oblast
- Gremyachaya, a railway station in Pimeno-Chernyansky Selsoviet of Kotelnikovsky District of Volgograd Oblast
