= 240th Rifle Division =

240th Motorized Division (March 11, 1941 – August 6, 1941) 240th Rifle Division (August 6, 1941 – July 1945)
- Active: 1941–1945
- Country: Soviet Union
- Branch: Red Army
- Type: Infantry
- Role: Motorized Infantry
- Size: Division
- Engagements: World War II; Operation Barbarossa; Battle of Uman; Case Blue; Voronezh–Kastornoye offensive; Battle of Kursk; Belgorod–Kharkov offensive operation; Battle of the Dniepr; Second Battle of Kiev; Zhitomir–Berdichev offensive; Uman–Botoșani offensive; First Jassy–Kishinev offensive; Second Jassy–Kishinev offensive; Battle of Debrecen; Budapest offensive; Western Carpathian offensive; Bratislava–Brno offensive
- Decorations: Order of the Red Banner; Order of Suvorov; Order of Bogdan Khmelnitsky
- Battle honours: Kiev; Dniepr

Commanders
- Notable commanders: Col. Ivan Vasilyevich Gorbenko; Maj. Gen. Stepan Aleksandrovich Ivanov; Maj. Gen. Pyotr Pyotrovich Avdeenko; Maj. Gen. Terentii Fomich Umanskii

The 240th Rifle Division was formed as an infantry division of the Red Army after a motorized division of that same number was reorganized in the first months of the German invasion of the Soviet Union. It was based on the shtat (table of organization and equipment) of July 29, 1941, with several modifications. This conversion required several months and the division arrived at the front too late to see much action in the winter counteroffensive west of Moscow. At the start of the German summer offensive in June 1942 it was serving in Bryansk Front west of Voronezh and gradually fell back to east of that city before taking part in the Voronezh–Kastornoye offensive in January and February 1943, liberating the town of Tim and assisting in the elimination of an encircled column of German and Hungarian troops as part of 38th Army. As part of this Army it played a minor role in the Battle of Kursk and then a more major one in the subsequent advance through eastern Ukraine. After arriving at the Dniepr River north of Kyiv the 240th was instrumental in establishing the bridgehead at Lyutizh which later became the springboard for the liberation of the Ukrainian capital, and would be awarded battle honors for both of these accomplishments. During the offensives into western Ukraine in the spring of 1944 the division won, in quick succession, the Order of Bogdan Khmelnitsky, the Order of the Red Banner and the Order of Suvorov. As part of 40th Army, mostly under 50th Rifle Corps, it took part in the Jassy–Kishinev offensives and the subsequent advance across the Carpathian Mountains into Hungary. During the fighting through that country and into Slovakia during the months leading to the German surrender the subunits of the division were awarded a large number of decorations and other honors, but despite this distinguished record the 240th was surplus to requirements and was disbanded in the summer of 1945.

== 240th Motorized Division ==
The division began forming in March 1941 as part of the prewar buildup of Soviet mechanized forces, at Kupiansk in the Kharkov Military District as part of the 16th Mechanized Corps. It was the highest-numbered motorized division formed by the Red Army. Its order of battle was as follows:

- 836th Motorized Rifle Regiment
- 842nd Motorized Rifle Regiment
- 145th Tank Regiment
- 692nd Artillery Regiment
- 217th Antitank Battalion
- 9th Antiaircraft Battalion
- 271st Reconnaissance Battalion
- 368th Light Engineer Battalion
- 575th Signal Battalion
- 221st Artillery Park Battalion
- 396th Medical/Sanitation Battalion
- 706th Motor Transport Battalion
- 198th Repair and Restoration Battalion
- 55th Regulatory Company
- 491st Motorized Field Bakery
- 602nd Field Postal Station
- 533rd Field Office of the State Bank

Col. Ivan Vasilyevich Gorbenko was appointed to command on the day the division began forming; he had previously led the 18th Separate Motorized Brigade. He would remain in this position after the 240th was converted to a regular rifle division. The 16th Mechanized also contained the 15th and 39th Tank Divisions and the 19th Motorcycle Regiment. On June 22 the 240th was stationed in the area of Kamianets-Podilskyi as part of 12th Army in Southwestern Front; the Corps was spread along a huge stretch of the Dniestr River, as far as Kalush to the west. The 145th Tank Regiment seems to have existed mostly on paper, and, in common with most of the motorized divisions formed in 1941, it was short most of its authorized motor vehicles. Consequently its motorized regiments served as regular marching infantry, supporting the two tank divisions.

By July 1 the 16th Mechanized had been reassigned to the 18th Army of Southern Front, but ten days later it was back in Southwestern Front, now under command of 6th Army. This Army's 7th Rifle Corps was encircled along the Sluch River and the Army commander, Lt. Gen. I. N. Muzychenko, intended to launch a relief operation with the 16th and 18th Mechanized Corps, in conjunction with forces of 5th Army, but by the time the 16th arrived Muzychenko was forced to commit it along the Berdychiv axis to protect his rear area. The positions of 6th and 12th Armies were becoming increasingly desperate and on July 21 the 1st Panzer Group completed their encirclement in the Uman area. As of August 1 the 16th Mechanized was still under command of 6th Army, but the relative handful of riflemen remaining to the 240th had already been withdrawn back to Kharkiv to be reformed as a standard rifle division.

== Formation ==
The 240th was officially redesignated on August 6, in the Kharkov Military District. Once this was completed its order of battle was as follows:

- 836th Rifle Regiment (from 836th Motorized Rifle Regiment)
- 842nd Rifle Regiment (from 842nd Motorized Rifle Regiment)
- 931st Rifle Regiment (from reservists)
- 692nd Artillery Regiment
- 373rd Antitank Battalion (later 217th)
- 516th Antiaircraft Battery (until May 5, 1943)
- 227th Mortar Battalion (until October 10, 1942)
- 531st Machine Gun Battalion (from October 10, 1942 until June 5, 1943)
- 271st Reconnaissance Company
- 368th Sapper Battalion
- 575th Signal Battalion (later 698th Signal Company)
- 396th Medical/Sanitation Battalion
- 121st Chemical Defense (Anti-gas) Company
- 271st Motor Transport Company
- 355th Field Bakery
- 27th Divisional Veterinary Hospital (later 714th)
- 033677th Field Postal Station (later 602nd, 7809th)
- 533rd Field Office of the State Bank

Colonel Gorbenko left the division on September 29 and then served in the cavalry training establishment until August 1944 when he took over the 67th Mechanized Brigade for the duration of the war. He was replaced by Col. Mikhail Gavrilovich Parovishnikov until November 25 when Maj. Gen. Stepan Aleksandrovich Ivanov took command; this NKVD officer had previously led the 256th and 257th Rifle Divisions. The 240th remained in Kharkov District into November, but as German forces closed in it was moved to the Stalingrad Military District to complete its formation. On January 18, 1942 it became part of the active army when it joined the reserves of Bryansk Front; in February it was assigned to 3rd Army in that Front.

=== Case Blue ===
During January the Front had been engaged in fighting for Bolkhov and Mtsensk, but without and significant success. By January 25 the 4th and 9th Armies of Army Group Center had developed a network of strong fortifications and further efforts to liberate these cities were stymied. On April 29, General Ivanov was placed at disposal of the Main Personnel Directorate; he did not hold another field command for the duration. He was replaced by Col. Pyotr Pyotrovich Avdeenko, who had been serving as Ivanov's deputy commander. This officer handed his command to Col. Viktor Lvovich Makhlinovskii on June 8, but returned 20 days later. The 240th remained in Bryansk Front until September, fighting in battles of local significance; in July it was moved to Operational Group Chibisov in preparation for an offensive against 6th Army's drive toward Voronezh, but it was not among the five rifle divisions committed to this attack. In August Chibisov's Group was redesignated as 38th Army, still in Bryansk Front, but as the German offensive continued the Army fell back along the Don River and was transferred to Voronezh Front. The 240th would remain in this Army and Front until November 1943. It held defensive positions near Terbuny until January 1943.

== Voronezh–Kastornoye Offensive ==
At the start of the Ostrogozhsk–Rossosh Offensive on January 13 the Army had the 237th, 167th, and 240th Rifle Divisions, 248th Rifle Brigade, and 7th Destroyer (Antitank) Brigade under command, and was led by General Chibisov. During that offensive the 38th was assigned a defensive role, holding along a 55km-wide sector from Kozinka to Olkhovatka. By January 19 the main forces of Hungarian 2nd and Italian 8th Armies had been encircled and over the following days were largely destroyed, creating conditions for a further offensive against the German 2nd Army and the rump of the Hungarian 2nd.

The 17 rifle divisions involved in the offensive averaged 5,000-6,000 men each, armed with 4,000-5,000 rifles, 500 sub-machine guns, 100 light and 50 heavy machine guns, 100-180 mortars of all calibres, and 75 guns, including 25 antitank guns. When the operation began on January 24 Chibisov had formed a shock group with his 167th and 240th Divisions, the 7th Destroyer Brigade, plus the 180th Tank Brigade and 14th Separate Tank Battalion. The 237th and the 248th Brigade were to continue an active defense along the remaining 46km front. Following the breakthrough the 240th and 7th Brigade were to attack toward Kastornoye to link up with forces of 13th and 40th Armies. By now the Army had the 206th Rifle Division (minus a regiment) as a reserve. Once the encirclement was made the secondary attacks by 38th and 60th Armies would split up and eliminate the isolated forces.

When the offensive began the command of Army Group B correctly determined its intention and possibilities. Believing that the encirclement of its 2nd Army would only be a matter of several days, orders were given to the VII Army Corps to withdraw from Voronezh and across the Don. Reconnaissance by 60th Army discovered this movement and it began to pursue. By dawn on January 25 the city had been completely cleared. 38th Army's offensive began on January 25, moved up a day due to the German retreat from Voronezh. The attack did not begin until 1630 hours following a 30-minute artillery preparation on a 14km sector from Kozinka to Ozerki, with the objective of reaching a line from Olymchik to Height 226. The 240th and 167th Divisions led with forward battalions to take German strongpoints on Heights 229 and 236, but these were unable to penetrate the defense. Colonel Avdeenko committed a few more battalions from his first echelon, but it was only by dawn of the following day the northern slopes of Height 229 were cleared. The offensive was renewed later that morning with another artillery preparation. The 240th captured another strongpoint at Nikolskoe and by the end of the day the shock group had penetrated the Axis defense to a depth of up to 8km as the defenders weakened and began to withdraw to the south. By day's end the shock group had reached the line Berezovka–Olymchik–Golosnovka and had begun fighting for these villages. The 237th and the 248th Brigade, while continuing to defend their line, received instructions from Chibisov to be ready to go over to the offensive in the direction of Zemlyansk and Perlevka.

As the Axis withdrawal accelerated the 38th Army went over to the attack along its entire front on January 27. Col. Gen. F. I. Golikov, commander of Voronezh Front, ordered a change to the operational plan, sending the shock group plus the 180th Tanks in the direction of Kastornoye. This led to an advance of 15km during the day's fighting, with the 240th reaching the line of Horse Farm No. 107–Malaya Troitskaya by day's end before receiving orders to continue its advance through the night. The next day the tank brigade reached Kastornoye in conjunction with mobile forces of the 13th and 40th Armies, followed by rifle units of the 13th Army and the 240th and 167th Divisions, leading to a stubborn fight for the town until 1600 hours on January 29. As a result of these advances the main escape routes of the Axis Voronezh-Kastornoye group of forces had been cut.

=== Battle for the Pocket ===
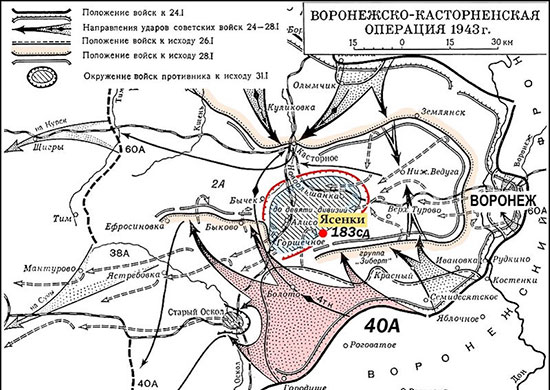
Voronezh–Kastornoye Offensive

A total of eight German and two Hungarian divisions were now encircled. 38th and 40th Armies were assigned the task of clearing the pocket while the remaining Armies continued advancing westward. The clearing operation was expected to take two or three days after which the two Armies would redeploy to lines for a subsequent offensive toward Oboyan and Kharkiv. By the end of January 29 the 240th and 167th reached the line Nikolskoe-Klyuchevskaya–Olekhovskoe Tovarishchevo. By the end of the next day the two divisions reached the line Matveevka–Verkhnyaya Graivoronka–Nazarovka. On January 31 they reached the line Bystrets–Golovishche while throwing back Axis rearguards.

On February 1 General Chibisov was ordered to occupy the town of Tim with the 240th and 167th Divisions. However, there remained an Axis group of 30,000-35,000 men east of Gorshechnoe still attempting to break out of the encirclement and the five other rifle divisions plus one rifle brigade of 38th Army were tied down in fighting with it. The attempt to reach Tim fell short, with the two divisions reaching the line Korovi Verkhi–Puzachi. An Axis breakout effort to the west and southwest, organized in three columns, began overnight on February 1/2. Meanwhile, forward units of 4th Panzer Division and several second-line formations had arrived in the Kursk area to face 60th Army and the two divisions of the 38th. By the end of February 4 the northern (Siebert) column was desperately seeking to break through in the direction of Bogatyrevo but was blocked by the 206th Division. The rearguards of the central (Bruchmann) column were being engaged in the Gorshechnoe area by the 237th and one regiment of the 25th Guards Rifle Division. While this was going on the 240th and 167th continued to attack in the directions of Tim and Manturovo.

During February 4 the 240th attacked Tim and began fighting along its eastern outskirts. The German 395th Assault Battalion counterattacked twice in the direction of Korovenka, but was unsuccessful. Having defeated these efforts, by the end of the day the division's units broke into the town and began clearing it. Meanwhile, the third (Gollwitzer) column of the encircled grouping was falling back toward Tim and Chibisov was forced to move parts of the 240th and 167th across its path of retreat while the remainder continued advancing west. Late in the evening of February 5 the task of defeating the encircled forces had finally been entrusted to 38th Army alone. The 240th was ordered to continue to hold Tim while hindering the Gollwitzer column from reaching the town from the southeast. Operations through February 6-7 took place in blizzard conditions; roads were covered with snow and visibility was extremely limited. Throughout the second day the Axis column continued its unsuccessful attempts to break through to Manturovo while the division occupied Tim and Stanovoe, having organized a defense with one rifle regiment along Heights 256 and 255.

On February 8 the snowstorm continued. In the morning the 237th was forced back from its previous line and, following stubborn fighting, withdrew to a line from Korovi Verkhi to Belovskie Dvory to Teplyi where it established contact with elements of the 240th on the two heights. Siebert's group was also attempting to break through to Tim but was foiled by the 240th. On the same day elements of 60th Army liberated Kursk, while 40th Army reached Belgorod and completely cleared it on February 9. Siebert's group, having failed to reach Tim, began moving to the south. This began to put it in the rear of the 232nd Division and the 237th was ordered to engage Siebert's rearguard. Despite this assistance the 232nd and 167th Divisions were threatened with encirclement and began pulling back, allowing all three Axis groupings to withdraw through Manturovo in the direction of Solntsevo.

The blizzard finally abated on February 10. It had caused serious difficulties in keeping the Red Army units supplied with ammunition, in particular, although it had also forced the Axis groups to abandon their artillery and vehicles. The 240th was to turn over the defense of Tim to the 129th Rifle Brigade and reach the Solntsevo area the following day, preventing any further retreat toward Oboyan. Avdeenko, who had been promoted to the rank of major general on February 4, was also ordered to send a forward detachment, consisting of a reinforced rifle battalion, to the Maksimovo area to secure the division's arrival at the line Gridasovo–Solntsevo and to cover it against possible Axis attacks from the north and northwest. This plan miscarried since the Axis columns won the race to Solntsevo; the forward detachment had insufficient strength to prevent this. The next day it became clear to Chibisov that the Axis columns were slipping away and urged his forces onward. The 86th Tank Brigade had been ordered to join the 240th at Tim but it could not immediately join the division's attack due to a shortage of fuel. The two formations finally left the town on the night of February 11/12 and occupied the towns of Belyi and Subbotino in the afternoon, cutting the Bruchmann column's only route to Solntsevo and largely destroyed it, with the assistance of the 237th, in the Manturovo area.

Meanwhile, the other two groups reached Oboyan and Pselets. Most of the remainder of the Axis forces prepared to defend Oboyan. Chibisov now ordered his forces to encircle and destroy the Axis garrison of that town in preparation for a renewed offensive on Sumy, 100 km to the southwest. By the end of February 16 Oboyan was already partly encircled by three rifle divisions; the 240th, while moving from Vyshnyaya Kotova and covering the Army's right flank, occupied Kuliga and Rudavets and had begun fighting for Pushkarnoye. Chibisov planned to take Oboyan in an attack from three sides on February 18 but on the day before, anticipating the attack, the Axis garrison staged a hasty retreat. In the end only a few thousand men of the original encircled Axis force managed to escape.

== Battle of Kursk ==
German plan of attack at Kursk. The position of 38th Army is shown in the southwest corner of the salient.

By the end of February Army Group South was well into its counteroffensive but this did not directly threaten 38th Army before it shut down in mid-March. In early May the STAVKA made its decision to stand on the defensive within the Kursk salient which was occupied by the Central and Voronezh Fronts. The new commander of the latter, Army Gen. N. F. Vatutin, reported as follows on May 11:

The forces of the Voronezh Front are ready to carry out their defensive assignments. All of the rifle divisions of the 38th, 40th, 6th Guards and 7th Guards Armies, with very few exceptions, each have 8,000 or more men... The main portion of arms has arrived by railroad in the last few days. Thus the bulk of the weapons will be issued to the troops by the end of 14.5.1943.

38th Army, still under command of General Chibisov, was assigned a front 80km wide between 40th Army and the boundary with Central Front. On June 25 Avdeenko was given command of the newly-formed 51st Rifle Corps, and on July 1 he handed the division over to Col. Terentii Fomich Umanskii. This officer, who had previously led the 836th Rifle Regiment and then served as the division's deputy commander, would be promoted to the rank of major general on September 13, 1944 and would remain in command for the duration of the war. At the outset of the battle the 240th was assigned to 51st Corps with the 180th and 204th Rifle Divisions, of which the former two were in the Army's first echelon and the latter was in second.

The division manned, apart from other defenses, an antitank strongpoint consisting of three guns and nine antitank rifles. In the event, since the main attack of Army Group South fell on the positions of the 6th and 7th Guards Armies well to the east, the 38th Army saw little action during Operation Zitadelle. Having been stripped of one rifle division and both tank brigades during this fighting it was not in a position to take part in the first stages of Operation Polkovodets Rumyantsev, being committed to occupying its 72km-wide sector, carrying out combat reconnaissance, and tying down the German forces it faced. It finally began advancing with its left-flank forces after receiving orders on August 8. The first attempt to break the German front failed, but a renewed effort the next day broke through the entire depth of the defense along a 20km front. During August 12-16 the 38th and 40th Armies were fighting along the line Verkhnyaya Syrovatka–Trostianets and were unable to advance. They renewed the offensive on the morning of August 17 and, with the assistance of 47th Army, released from Front reserve, broke through again and advanced up to 12km. The German grouping near Okhtyrka pressed counterattacks against the Front's forces until August 20 until it lost its offensive capability. Kharkiv was liberated for the last time on August 23, and three other divisions of 38th Army shared honors for the liberation of Sumy on September 2. Following this victory the Army began advancing toward the Dniepr.

== Battles for Kyiv ==
By September 9 the 38th Army was attacking along the Kyiv axis, preparing to force the Dniepr immediately south of the city. However, when its forces were already only two to three marches from the river Vatutin ordered Chibisov to regroup to his right wing so as to instead make its crossing north of Kyiv. The Army was tasked with creating a bridgehead, reaching as far as the Irpin River, while also destroying the German east bank bridgehead at Darnitsa. The four divisions of 51st Corps were to make the crossing while 50th Corps operated against Darnitsa. As of September 20 the 240th was recorded as being one of the strongest of 38th Army's rifle divisions with 8,442 personnel, armed with 70 82 mm and 19 120 mm mortars, 13 76 mm regimental and 19 76 mm divisional guns, three trophy 105 mm howitzers and 10 122 mm howitzers. By the end of September 22 the 240th and the main forces of the 167th reached the Desna River along the Letki–Rozhny sector, with no opposition in front of them, but the 208th Infantry Division was approaching the west bank of the Dniepr from the mouth of the Irpen as far as Kyiv. The two rifle divisions were tasked with forcing the Desna as quickly as possible so as to seize bridgeheads over the Dniepr before the defense could consolidate.

38th Army had left most of its crossing equipment well to the rear, so was forced to rely on improvised means. It was near the end of September 24 when the 240th reached the Svaromye area and the 167th the Staroselye area. The 180th arrived on September 25 and the 340th Rifle Division even later. Overnight on September 25/26 the first crossing was attempted but this was repulsed by artillery and small arms fire. By the end of the 26th the reconnaissance company of the 180th had got over while one battalion of the 167th occupied a midstream island near Vyshhorod and on the 27th the 240th also got a company across near Svaromye. One of the first men over was Jr. Sgt. Yegor Mitrofanovich Zavelytskii, who led the crew of a heavy machine gun of the 842nd Rifle Regiment. The first task was to join the several footholds into a united bridgehead (later known as the Lyutizh bridgehead) and, according to the regimental commander, Lt. Col. V. G. Potsikaylo, Zavelytskii was instrumental in turning the captured positions into a fortress. During the fighting for the village of Lyutizh itself on October 4 his gun crew was responsible for helping to repel 13 counterattacks. On October 18 Potsikaylo recommended him for the award of the Gold Star of a Hero of the Soviet Union, which was granted on January 10, 1944. Before this took place Zavelytskii went missing and it was not until the 1990s that local historians determined that he had died of wounds in a hospital in Belgorod on October 26, 1943.

46 other men of the division would also become Heroes for the Dniepr crossing, including Colonel Umanskii who entered the bridgehead himself on September 29. Even in the midst of the battle General Avdeenko recommended that he be made a Hero of the Soviet Union, which came about on October 29. At this point Umanskii had three battalions across the Dniepr, but the four divisions of 51st Corps were facing elements of four German divisions. At this point the STAVKA issued a new directive for the Front's operations on the west bank in order to envelop Kyiv from the north, west and south. 38th Army would launch the main attack from the north with five divisions, and a supporting attack with three divisions south of the city toward Zhuliany. The objective was to liberate the city on October 7. Two divisions of 50th Corps managed to cross south of the city on October 2-3 but 51st Corps made little progress expanding its northern bridgehead and the deadline passed. Voronezh Front (as of October 20 1st Ukrainian Front) was reinforced late on October 5 with the 13th and 60th Armies from Central Front. This brought the Lyutizh bridgehead within the Front's boundaries. The Army attacked from October 6-10 to expand this bridgehead but with scant success. On October 20 the Front was redesignated as 1st Ukrainian, and a week later Chibisov handed 38th Army over to Col. Gen. K. S. Moskalenko.

=== Liberation of Kyiv ===
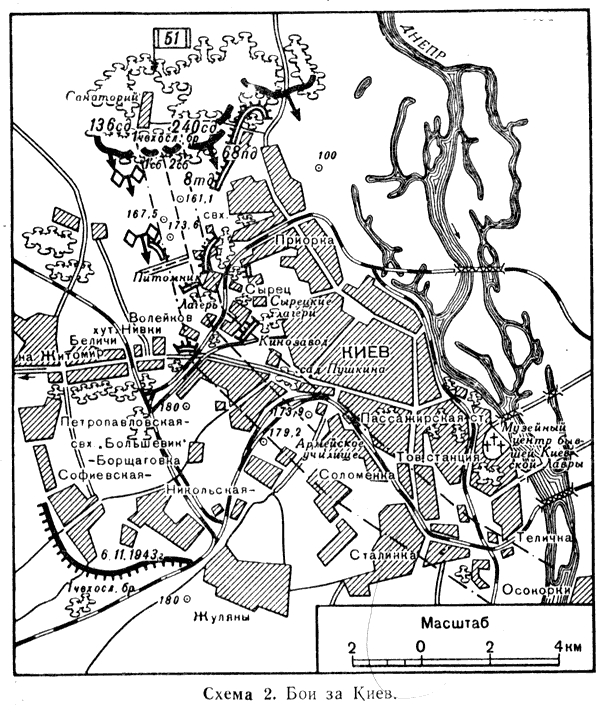
Soviet map of Kiev (1943). Note position of the 240th entering the city from the north.

A significant regrouping took place in late October as the STAVKA gave up on efforts to break out of the bridgehead at Bukryn, south of Kyiv; among other measures the 3rd Guards Tank Army was to move north to join the 38th and 60th Armies in breaking out of the Lyutizh bridgehead. This flank of the offensive was to begin on November 3. The German defenses in front of 38th Army were generally simple but extended to a depth of up to 14km. In order to break through these defenses Moskalenko concentrated his 50th and 51st Corps, backed by 5th Guards Tank Corps, along the 14km-wide sector from Moshchun to Vyshhorod with a shock group of two divisions of each Corps in the center (232nd, 167th, 136th and 240th) on a 6km front. The 136th and 240th was supported by two brigades of the 5th Guards Tanks and were to launch their main attack along the right wing in the direction of the children's sanitarium and Syrets, and by the close of the first day were to reach a line from outside Berkovets to the northern outskirts of Priorka; subsequently the 51st Corps was to completely liberate Kyiv by the end of the third day. It was to be reinforced by the Czechoslovak Brigade from the Army reserve during the course of the offensive. The shock group was further supported by an average of 347.5 guns and mortars (76mm+ calibre) per kilometre.

After the reading aloud of an order by Vatutin and Lt. Gen. N. S. Khrushchev to the troops, urging the storming of Kyiv, the artillery opened at 0800 hours for a 40-minute preparation. The infantry and armor advance began at 0840 and despite heavy fire resistance and counterattacks, particularly in the Vyshhorod area, the shock group managed to gain 5-12km during the day. Much of the terrain was heavily wooded, which complicated the offensive, as did the presence of the 7th and 8th Panzer and 20th Motorized Divisions in immediate reserve. For November 4, Moskalenko directed 51st Corps to clear the city and reach the front Yankovichi–Khodosovka–opposite Kazachii Island by the end of November 5. Through the 4th the 38th Army gained an additional 5km in the face of significant armored counterattacks. On the next morning it became clear that a major withdrawal of German forces was underway and soon the entire 51st Corps, plus the 167th Division and the Czech Brigade, was fighting in the city itself. By 0400 hours on November 6 Kyiv had been cleared, and the 240th received its first honorific:

KIEV... 240th Rifle Division (Colonel Umanskii, Terentii Fomich)... The troops who participated in the liberation of Kiev, by the order of the Supreme High Command of 6 November 1943, and a commendation in Moscow, are given a salute of 24 artillery salvoes from 324 guns.

On November 17 the division would receive its second battle honor, "Dniepr", for its part in the creation of the Lyutizh bridgehead. Through the rest of November 6 the 38th Army continued to develop the offensive to the south and advanced 20km; 51st Corps was slowly advancing south from the city and at day's end was out of contact with German forces. The following day the 5th Guards Tanks was removed from its support role to help form a mobile group to exploit toward Zhytomyr. This objective was to be reached by the end of November 9.

On November 7 the Army was directed to advance toward Bila Tserkva and it covered 6-12km, although it was noted that 51st Corps was lagging, despite still facing no opposition. The next day it reached a line from Germanovka to Dolina to Zhukovtsy to Vitachev, covering 12km. However, the 4th Panzer Army was now gathering reserves, including the new 25th Panzer and the 2nd SS Panzer Divisions, and these began counterattacking the 3rd Guards Tank Army. The situation was complicated by the inability of 50th Corps to reach Fastiv to relieve the tank army for more decisive operations. By the end of November 9 the 51st Corps was fighting on the line Germanovka–Dolina–Cherniakhiv–Staika, and the next day was at the Makeevka–Mirovka–Cherniakhiv–Vitashev line.

During the afternoon of November 10 Vatutin issued an order to shift the 40th Army's main efforts from the Bukryn bridgehead to the Cherniakhiv area. The Army commander, Lt. Gen. F. F. Zhmachenko, was ordered to unite the operations of his troops which had been transferred to the Kailov area from Bukryn and the forces operating on the left wing of 38th Army, which included 51st Corps. The 240th would remain in 40th Army for the duration, and by the beginning of December it would be part of 50th Corps, which was also transferred to this Army. On November 11 the lead elements of 1st Panzer Division began arriving in the Bila Tserkva area and the STAVKA directed Vatutin to go over to the defensive. On November 15 the division was recorded as being one of the stronger of 40th Army's rifle divisions with 6,640 personnel, armed with 61 82 mm and 18 120 mm mortars, 13 regimental and 17 divisional guns, the same three trophy 105 mm howitzers, and nine 122 mm howitzers.

== Jassy–Kishinev Offensives ==
Uman–Botoșani Offensive. Note initial position of 40th Army.

During February 1944 the 40th Army was transferred to 2nd Ukrainian Front, which was commanded by Marshal I. S. Konev. During the Zhitomir–Berdichev Offensive in January the division had reached the approaches to Uman, but had been forced back. The Uman–Botoșani operation began on March 5 and the 240th broke through the heavily fortified German line on the first day; within days it had liberated dozens of towns and villages while also killing or capturing several thousand German soldiers and capturing a large number of trophies. In recognition of these feats the division was awarded the Order of Bogdan Khmelnitsky, 2nd Degree, on March 19 in recognition of its role in the liberation of Uman. During the month it was transferred to the 104th Rifle Corps, where it joined the 38th Rifle Division.

40th Army reached the Dniestr River and the border of Romania near Mohyliv-Podilskyi on March 19 and the 240th soon forced a crossing. Within days it took part in the capture of Bălți; for these two accomplishments it would be decorated with the Order of the Red Banner on April 8. On that date Konev designated the 40th and 27th Armies as his Front's shock group and ordered the two Armies to begin a coordinated advance southward along the Târgu Frumos axis in close cooperation with the lead elements of 2nd Tank Army. 104th Corps was assigned the task of defending the Army's long right wing and flank in cooperation with the 159th Fortified Region. In the course of reaching this line the division forced a crossing of the Prut River and on April 24 it would again be decorated, now with the Order of Suvorov, 2nd Degree.

During April the division returned to 50th Corps as a part of a regrouping ordered by Konev on April 23 for a new drive on Târgu Frumos. This would be led by 51st Corps on the 40th Army's sector. In large part due to the arrival of the German V Army Corps this attack, beginning on April 24, actually caused 51st Corps to lose ground until the situation stabilized on April 28. Konev immediately began planning a new push, ordering General Zhmachenko to organize and conduct two secondary supporting attacks in the area north of Târgu Neamț and Pașcani to tie down German and Romanian reserves. The first supporting attack near Răucești was to be made by 104th Corps, which the 240th had just rejoined. The offensive finally began at dawn on May 2 but only the 104th achieved any success, advancing up to 7km against the Romanian defenders, but the division, in second echelon, played little role in this. On May 7 the Front was ordered to go over to the defense.

=== Second Jassy–Kishinev Offensive ===
The 240th quickly returned to 50th Corps, then back to the 104th in June, before again shifting to 50th Corps. The division remained on the defensive in the same area until well into August. When the new offensive began on August 20 the 50th Corps had only the 133rd and 240th Divisions under command. and was again assigned a supporting role to attack from the area south and southwest of Pașcani in the general direction of Tupilați. 40th Army, still on the right (west) flank of the Front, saw only local fighting on the first three days, while the Front's shock groups crushed Axis resistance south of Iași and overcame the rear defensive line. At 1530 hours on August 23 the 51st Corps went over to the attack and by dusk had reached as far to the east as the Siret River. The remainder of the Army remained inactive that day, but was ordered to go over to the offensive on August 24, force the Moldova River, and advance up to 16km, taking Tupilați in the process. In the event these goals were reached and even exceeded. By this time the bulk of the Axis forces had been destroyed or encircled and Romania had left the Axis alliance.

== Into Hungary and Slovakia ==
2nd Ukrainian Front, now under command of Marshal R. Ya. Malinovskii, was advancing into Hungary by October. As a result of this advance both the 836th Rifle Regiment and the 692nd Artillery Regiment were awarded the honorific "Carpathian", while on October 31 the 842nd Regiment would receive the Order of Bogdan Khmelnitsky, 2nd Degree, for the same accomplishment. During this month 40th Army was reduced to just four rifle divisions and a fortified region. On November 2 the 40th Army, which was still on the Front's right flank, was ordered to go over to a solid defense along the line of the Tisza River. The 40th, 27th and 53rd Armies, plus Pliyev's Cavalry-Mechanized Group, were operating in Transylvania and eastern Hungary during this time. On November 7 the grouping was ordered to attack in the general direction of Miskolc but this was delayed by German counterattacks and did not actually get underway until December 2. The next day Miskolc was taken and in recognition on December 16 the 836th Regiment would be awarded the Order of the Red Banner while the 368th Sapper Battalion won the Order of Alexander Nevsky. On the same date the 931st Rifle Regiment and the 692nd Artillery Regiment were presented with the Order of the Red Banner for their roles in the capture of Eger and Sikso.

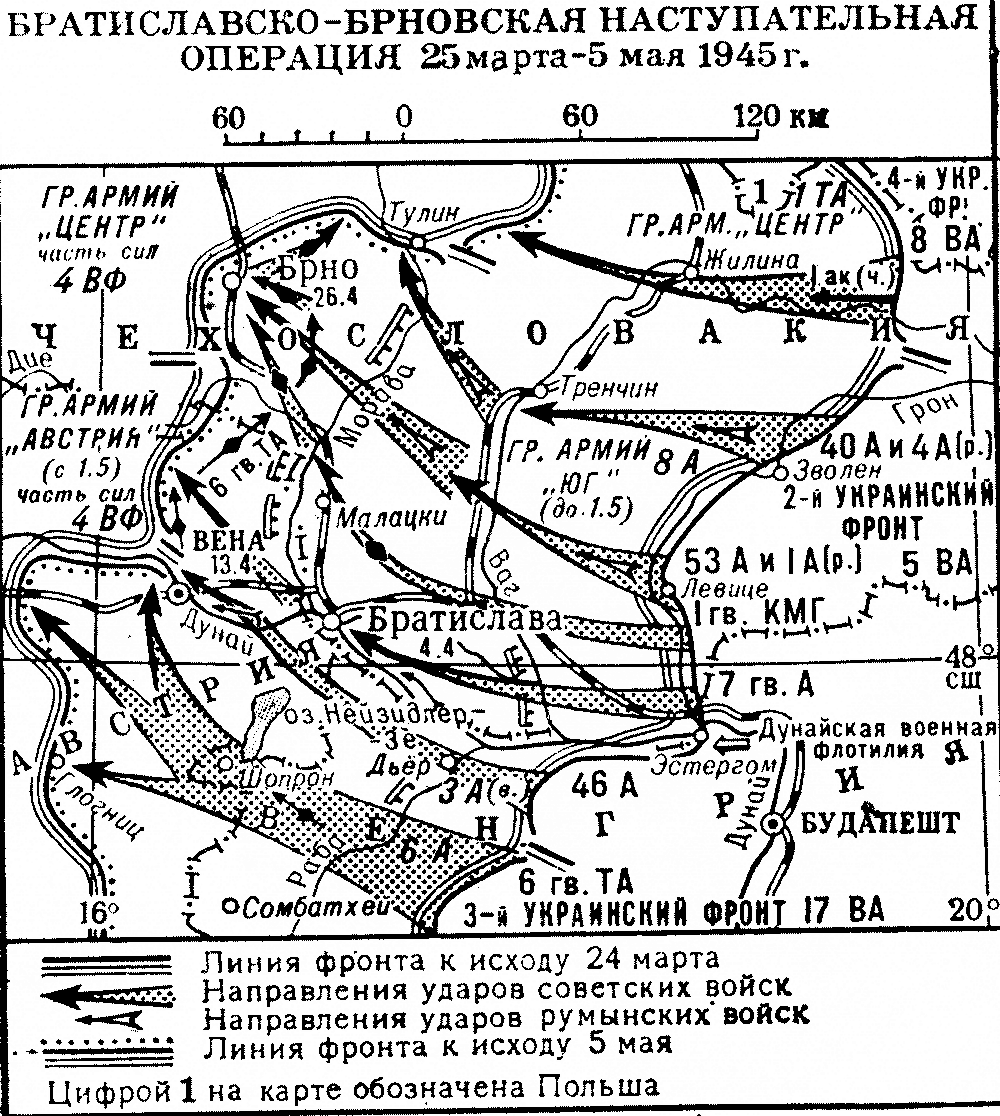
Bratislava-Brno Offensive. Note location of Zvolen (Зволен).

Along with the rest of 40th Army, still on the right flank of 2nd Ukrainian Front, the 240th advanced against German 8th Army into central Slovakia during the Western Carpathian Offensive, which began on January 12, 1945. During the preparations for the subsequent Bratislava-Brno Offensive, on March 14 one regiment of the division played a role in the capture of the city of Zvolen and received a battle honor:

ZVOLEN... 842nd Rifle Regiment (Lt. Colonel Voronov, Vyacheslav Ivanovich)... The troops who participated in the liberation of Zvolen, by the order of the Supreme High Command of 14 March 1945, and a commendation in Moscow, are given a salute of 12 artillery salvoes from 124 guns.

In addition, on April 5 the 373rd Antitank Battalion would be given the Order of the Red Star for its part in the same battle.

As the offensive continued the city of Banská Bystrica was liberated on March 26. One month later several subunits of the 240th received further honors: the 842nd and 931st Regiments would each be presented with the Order of Suvorov, 3rd Degree, the 692nd Artillery Regiment was given the Order of Bogdan Khmelnitsky, 2nd Degree, while the 368th Sapper Battalion won the 3rd Degree of the same Order. During March the 50th Corps was moved to the Front reserve and the division returned to 51st Corps, remaining under this headquarters for the duration of the war.

== Postwar ==
The division ended the war near Brno. Its men and women shared the full title of 240th Rifle, Kiev-Dniepr, Order of the Red Banner, Orders of Suvorov and Bogdan Khmelnitsky Division. (Russian: 240-я стрелковая Киевско-Днепровская Краснознамённая орденов Суворова и Богдана Хмельницкого дивизия.) As a final distinction, on May 17 the 836th Regiment was awarded the Order of Suvorov, 3rd Degree, for its part in the fighting for Magyaróvár. Despite this highly distinguished record, under the terms of STAVKA Order No. 11096 of May 29, 1945, part 8, the 240th is listed as one of the rifle divisions to be "disbanded in place". It was disbanded in accordance with the directive in July.
