= Verkhnenikolskoye, Voronezh Oblast =

Verkhnenikolskoye Верхненикольское
- Selo
- Location within Voronezh Oblast Location within Russia
- Coordinates: 51°29′N 38°37′E
- Country: Russia
- Region: Voronezh Oblast
- District: Khokholsky District
- Time zone: UTC+3:00

Verkhnenikolskoye (Russian: Верхненикольское) is a rural locality (a selo) in Khokholskoye Urban Settlement, Khokholsky District, Voronezh Oblast, Russia. The population was 83 as of 2010. There are 3 streets.

== Geography ==
Verkhnenikolskoye is located 17 km southwest of Khokholsky (the district's administrative centre) by road. Nizhneye Turovo is the nearest rural locality.
