= Khokholsky =

Khokholsky (masculine), Khokholskaya (feminine), or Khokholskoye (neuter) may refer to:

- Khokholsky District, a district of Voronezh Oblast, Russia
- Khokholsky (urban locality), an urban locality (a work settlement) in Khokholsky District of Voronezh Oblast, Russia
