= Yemancha 1-ya =

Yemancha 1-ya Еманча 1-я
- Selo
- Location within Voronezh Oblast Location within Russia
- Coordinates: 51°32′N 38°54′E
- Country: Russia
- Region: Voronezh Oblast
- District: Khokholsky District
- Time zone: UTC+3:00

Yemancha 1-ya (Russian: Еманча 1-я) is a rural locality (a selo) in Khokholskoye Urban Settlement, Khokholsky District, Voronezh Oblast, Russia. The population was 361 as of 2010. There are 9 streets.

== Geography ==
Yemancha 1-ya is located 17 km southeast of Khokholsky (the district's administrative centre) by road. Dmitriyevka is the nearest rural locality.
