= Nikolskoye-na-Yemanche =

Nikolskoye-na-Yemanche Никольское-на-Еманче
- Selo
- Location within Voronezh Oblast Location within Russia
- Coordinates: 51°28′N 38°49′E
- Country: Russia
- Region: Voronezh Oblast
- District: Khokholsky District
- Time zone: UTC+3:00

Nikolskoye-na-Yemanche (Russian: Никольское-на-Еманче) is a rural locality (a selo) in Staronikolskoye Rural Settlement, Khokholsky District, Voronezh Oblast, Russia. The population was 410 as of 2010. There are 2 streets.

== Geography ==
Nikolskoye-na-Yemanche is located 24 km south of Khokholsky (the district's administrative centre) by road. Staronikolskoye is the nearest rural locality.
