= Borshchyovo, Khokholsky District, Voronezh Oblast =

Borshchyovo Борщёво
- Selo
- Location within Voronezh Oblast Location within Russia
- Coordinates: 51°20′N 39°07′E
- Country: Russia
- Region: Voronezh Oblast
- District: Khokholsky District
- Time zone: UTC+3:00

Borshchyovo (Russian: Борщёво) is a rural locality (a selo) and the administrative center of Borshchyovskoye Rural Settlement, Khokholsky District, Voronezh Oblast, Russia. The population was 217 as of the 2010 census. There are six streets.

== Geography ==
Borshchyovo is located 48 km southeast of Khokholsky, the district's administrative center, by road. The nearest rural locality is Kamenno-Verkhovka.
