= Staronikolskoye =

Staronikolskoye Староникольское
- Selo
- Location within Voronezh Oblast Location within Russia
- Coordinates: 51°27′N 38°44′E
- Country: Russia
- Region: Voronezh Oblast
- District: Khokholsky District
- Time zone: UTC+3:00

Staronikolskoye (Russian: Староникольское) is a rural locality (a selo) and the administrative center of Staronikolskoye Rural Settlement, Khokholsky District, Voronezh Oblast, Russia. The population was 1,618 as of 2010. There are 8 streets.

== Geography ==
Staronikolskoye is located 17 km south of Khokholsky (the district's administrative centre) by road. Nikolskoye-na-Yemanche is the nearest rural locality.
