= Posyolok Opytnoy Stantsii VNIIK =

Posyolok Opytnoy Stantsii VNIIK Посёлок Опытной Станции ВНИИК
- Settlement
- Location within Voronezh Oblast Location within Russia
- Coordinates: 51°36′N 38°58′E
- Country: Russia
- Region: Voronezh Oblast
- District: Khokholsky District
- Time zone: UTC+3:00

Posyolok Opytnoy Stantsii VNIIK (Russian: Посёлок Опытной Станции ВНИИК) is a rural locality (a settlement) in Petinskoye Rural Settlement, Khokholsky District, Voronezh Oblast, Russia. The population was 977 as of 2010. There are 31 streets.

== Geography ==
It is located 24 km of from Khokholsky (the district's administrative centre) by road. Orlovka is the nearest rural locality.
