= Rudkino =

Rudkino Рудкино
- Selo
- Location within Voronezh Oblast Location within Russia
- Coordinates: 51°26′N 39°01′E
- Country: Russia
- Region: Voronezh Oblast
- District: Khokholsky District
- Time zone: UTC+3:00

Rudkino (Russian: Рудкино) is a rural locality (a khutor) in Gremyachenskoye Rural Settlement, Khokholsky District, Voronezh Oblast, Russia. The population was 921 as of 2010. There are 17 streets.

== Geography ==
Rudkino is located on the right bank of the Don River, 33 km southeast of Khokholsky (the district's administrative centre) by road. Gremyachye is the nearest rural locality.
