= Kochetovka =

Kochetovka Кочетовка
- Selo
- Location within Voronezh Oblast Location within Russia
- Coordinates: 51°21′N 38°48′E
- Country: Russia
- Region: Voronezh Oblast
- District: Khokholsky District
- Time zone: UTC+3:00

Kochetovka (Russian: Кочетовка) is a rural locality (a selo) in Kochetovskoye Rural Settlement, Khokholsky District, Voronezh Oblast, Russia. The population was 514 as of 2010. There are 7 streets.

== Geography ==
Kochetovka is located 31 km south of Khokholsky (the district's administrative centre) by road. Semidesyatnoye is the nearest rural locality.
