= Gremyachye, Khokholsky District, Voronezh Oblast =

Gremyachye Гремячье
- Selo
- Location within Voronezh Oblast Location within Russia
- Coordinates: 51°28′N 39°00′E
- Country: Russia
- Region: Voronezh Oblast
- District: Khokholsky District
- Time zone: UTC+3:00

Gremyachye (Russian: Гремячье) is a rural locality (a khutor) and the administrative center of Gremyachenskoye Rural Settlement, Khokholsky District, Voronezh Oblast, Russia. The population was 3,441 (2021 census); 3,373 as of 2010. There are 39 streets.

== Geography ==
Gremyachye is located 29 km southeast of Khokholsky (the district's administrative centre) by road. Novogremyachenskoye is the nearest rural locality.
