= Terbunsky District =

Terbunsky District Тербунский район (Russian)
- District
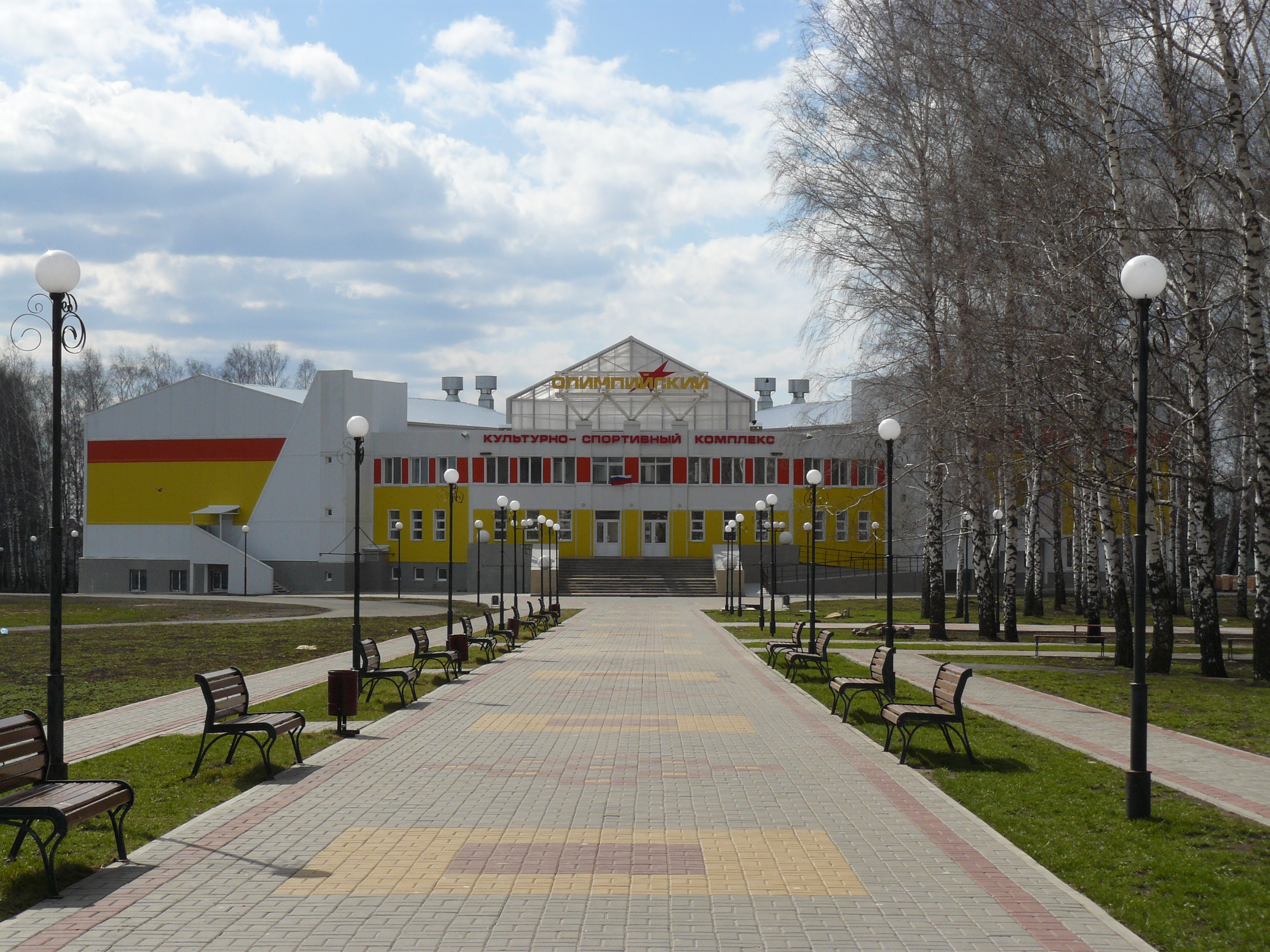
- Culture and Sports Complex, village Terbuny, Terbunsky District

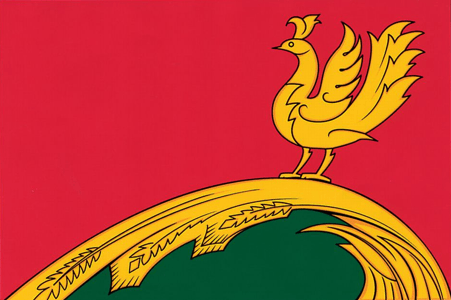
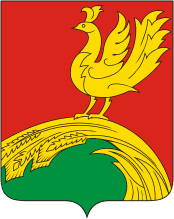
- Flag Coat of arms
- Location of Terbunsky District in Lipetsk Oblast
- Coordinates: 52°08′20″N 38°16′44″E
- Country: Russia
- Federal subject: Lipetsk Oblast
- Administrative center: Terbuny

Area
  - Total: 1,170 km^{2} (450 sq mi)

Population (2010 Census)
  - Total: 22,536
  - Density: 19.3/km^{2} (49.9/sq mi)
  - Urban: 0%
  - Rural: 100%

Administrative structure
  - Administrative divisions: 15 selsoviet
  - Inhabited localities: 75 rural localities

Municipal structure
  - Municipally incorporated as: Terbunsky Municipal District
  - Municipal divisions: 0 urban settlements, 15 rural settlements
- Time zone: UTC+3 (MSK)
- OKTMO ID: 42645000
- Website: http://terbuny.org/

Terbunsky District (Russian: Тербу́нский райо́н) is an administrative and municipal district (raion), one of the eighteen in Lipetsk Oblast, Russia. It is located in the southwest of the oblast. The area of the district is 1,170 square kilometers (450 sq mi). Its administrative center is the rural locality (a selo) of Terbuny. Population: 20,837 (2021 census); 22,536 (2010 census); 24,068 (2002 Census); 25,752 (1989 Soviet census). The population of Terbuny accounts for 37.2% of the district's total population.
