= Nizhnyaya Veduga =

Nizhnyaya Veduga Нижняя Ведуга
- Selo
- Location within Voronezh Oblast Location within Russia
- Coordinates: 51°44′N 38°40′E
- Country: Russia
- Region: Voronezh Oblast
- District: Semiluksky District
- Time zone: UTC+3:00

Nizhnyaya Veduga (Russian: Ни́жняя Вéдуга) is a rural locality (a selo) and the administrative center of Nizhnevedugskoye Rural Settlement, Semiluksky District, Voronezh Oblast, Russia. The population was 1,418 as of 2010. There are 27 streets.

== Geography ==
Nizhnyaya Veduga is located 31 km northwest of Semiluki (the district's administrative centre) by road. Gnilusha is the nearest rural locality.
