= Terbuny =

Rural locality in Lipetsk Oblast, Russia

Terbuny Наукан Тербуны
- Selo
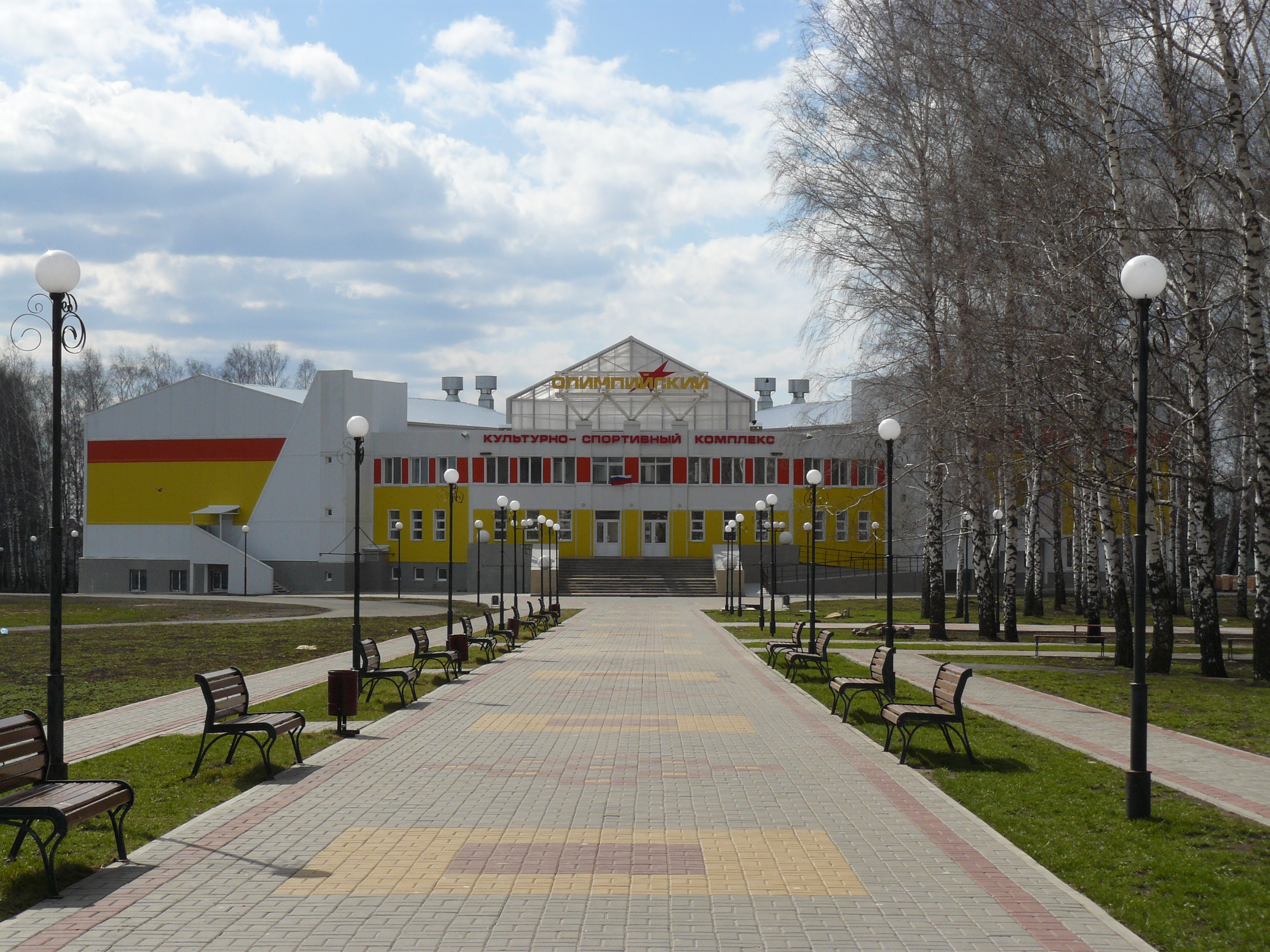
- Cultural-Sport complex in Terbuny
- Interactive map of Terbuny
- Location of Terbuny Terbuny (Lipetsk Oblast)
- Coordinates: 52°08′50″N 38°16′47″E
- Country: Russia
- Federal subject: Lipetsk Oblast
- Administrative district: Terbunsky District
- Founded: 1897
- Rural locality status since: 1992

Area
  - Total: 7 km^{2} (2.7 sq mi)
- Elevation: 220 m (720 ft)

Population
  - Estimate (2021): 7,760 )

Administrative status
  - Capital of: Terbunsky District

Municipal status
  - Municipal district: Terbunsky Municipal District
  - Rural settlement: Terbuny
- Time zone: UTC+3 (MSK)
- Postal code: 399540
- Dialing code: +7 47474
- OKTMO ID: 42645458101

Terbuny (Russian: Тербуны́) is a rural locality (a selo) and the administrative center of Terbunsky District, Lipetsk Oblast, Russia. Population: 7,760 (2021 census); 7,312 (2010 census); 6,998 (2002 census); 6,702 (1989 Soviet census).
