= Gremyachy, Syamzhensky District, Vologda Oblast =

Gremyachy Гремячий
- Settlement
- Location within Vologda Oblast Location within Russia
- Coordinates: 60°12′N 41°07′E
- Country: Russia
- Region: Vologda Oblast
- District: Syamzhensky District
- Time zone: UTC+3:00

Gremyachy (Russian: Гремячий) is a rural locality (a settlement) in Ramenskoye Rural Settlement, Syamzhensky District, Vologda Oblast, Russia. The population was 791 as of 2002. There are 13 streets.

== Geography ==
Gremyachy is located 35 km north of Syamzha (the district's administrative centre) by road. Klepikovskaya is the nearest rural locality.
