= Pushkarnoye =

Pushkarnoye Пушкарное
- Selo
- Location within Belgorod Oblast Location within Russia
- Coordinates: 50°37′N 36°26′E
- Country: Russia
- Region: Belgorod Oblast
- District: Belgorodsky District
- Time zone: UTC+3:00

Pushkarnoye (Russian: Пушкарное) is a rural locality (a selo) and the administrative center of Pushkarskoye Rural Settlement, Belgorodsky District, Belgorod Oblast, Russia. Population: 3,892 (2021 census); 2,040 (2010 census). There are 94 streets.

== Geography ==
Pushkarnoye is located 16 km north of Maysky (the district's administrative centre) by road. Dragunskoye is the nearest rural locality.
