= Gremyachy, Kalachyovsky District, Volgograd Oblast =

Gremyachy Гремячий
- Khutor
- Location within Volgograd Oblast Location within Russia
- Coordinates: 48°36′N 43°20′E
- Country: Russia
- Region: Volgograd Oblast
- District: Kalachyovsky District
- Time zone: UTC+4:00

Gremyachy (Russian: Гремячий) is a rural locality (a khutor) in Pyatiizbyanskoye Rural Settlement, Kalachyovsky District, Volgograd Oblast, Russia. The population was 5 as of 2010.

== Geography ==
Gremyachy is located 30 km southwest of Kalach-na-Donu (the district's administrative centre) by road. Pyatiizbyansky is the nearest rural locality.
