= Gubaryovo =

Gubaryovo Губарёво
- Selo
- Location within Voronezh Oblast Location within Russia
- Coordinates: 51°45′N 39°02′E
- Country: Russia
- Region: Voronezh Oblast
- District: Semiluksky District
- Time zone: UTC+3:00

Gubaryovo (Russian: Губарёво) is a rural locality (a selo) and the administrative center of Gubaryovskoye Rural Settlement, Semiluksky District, Voronezh Oblast, Russia. The population was 956 as of 2010. There are 18 streets.

== Geography ==
Gubaryovo is located on the right bank of the Veduga, 11 km north of Semiluki (the district's administrative centre) by road. Ternovoye is the nearest rural locality.
