= Gremyachaya =

Gremyachaya Гремячая
- Settlement
- Location within Volgograd Oblast Location within Russia
- Coordinates: 47°43′N 43°21′E
- Country: Russia
- Region: Volgograd Oblast
- District: Kotelnikovsky District
- Time zone: UTC+4:00

Gremyachaya (Russian: Гремячая) is a rural locality (a settlement) in Kotelnikovsky District, Volgograd Oblast, Russia. The population was 31 as of 2010.

== Geography ==
Gremyachaya is located 22 km northeast of Kotelnikovo (the district's administrative centre) by road. Pimeno-Cherni is the nearest rural locality.
