= Golovishche =

Golovishche Головище
- Khutor
- Location within Voronezh Oblast Location within Russia
- Coordinates: 51°55′N 38°41′E
- Country: Russia
- Region: Voronezh Oblast
- District: Semiluksky District
- Time zone: UTC+3:00

Golovishche (Russian: Головище) is a rural locality (a khutor) in Zemlyanskoye Rural Settlement, Semiluksky District, Voronezh Oblast, Russia. The population was 62 as of 2010.

== Geography ==
Golovishche is located 43 km northwest of Semiluki (the district's administrative centre) by road. Dolgoye is the nearest rural locality.
