= Nizhneye Turovo =

Nizhneye Turovo Нижнее Турово
- Selo
- Location within Voronezh Oblast Location within Russia
- Coordinates: 51°32′N 38°36′E
- Country: Russia
- Region: Voronezh Oblast
- District: Nizhnedevitsky District
- Time zone: UTC+3:00

Nizhneye Turovo (Russian: Нижнее Турово) is a rural locality (a selo) and the administrative center of Nizhneturovskoye Rural Settlement, Nizhnedevitsky District, Voronezh Oblast, Russia. The population was 488 as of 2018. There are 16 streets.

== Geography ==
Nizhneye Turovo is located 27 km east of Nizhnedevitsk (the district's administrative centre) by road. Verkhnenikolskoye is the nearest rural locality.
