= Moțca =

- Commune
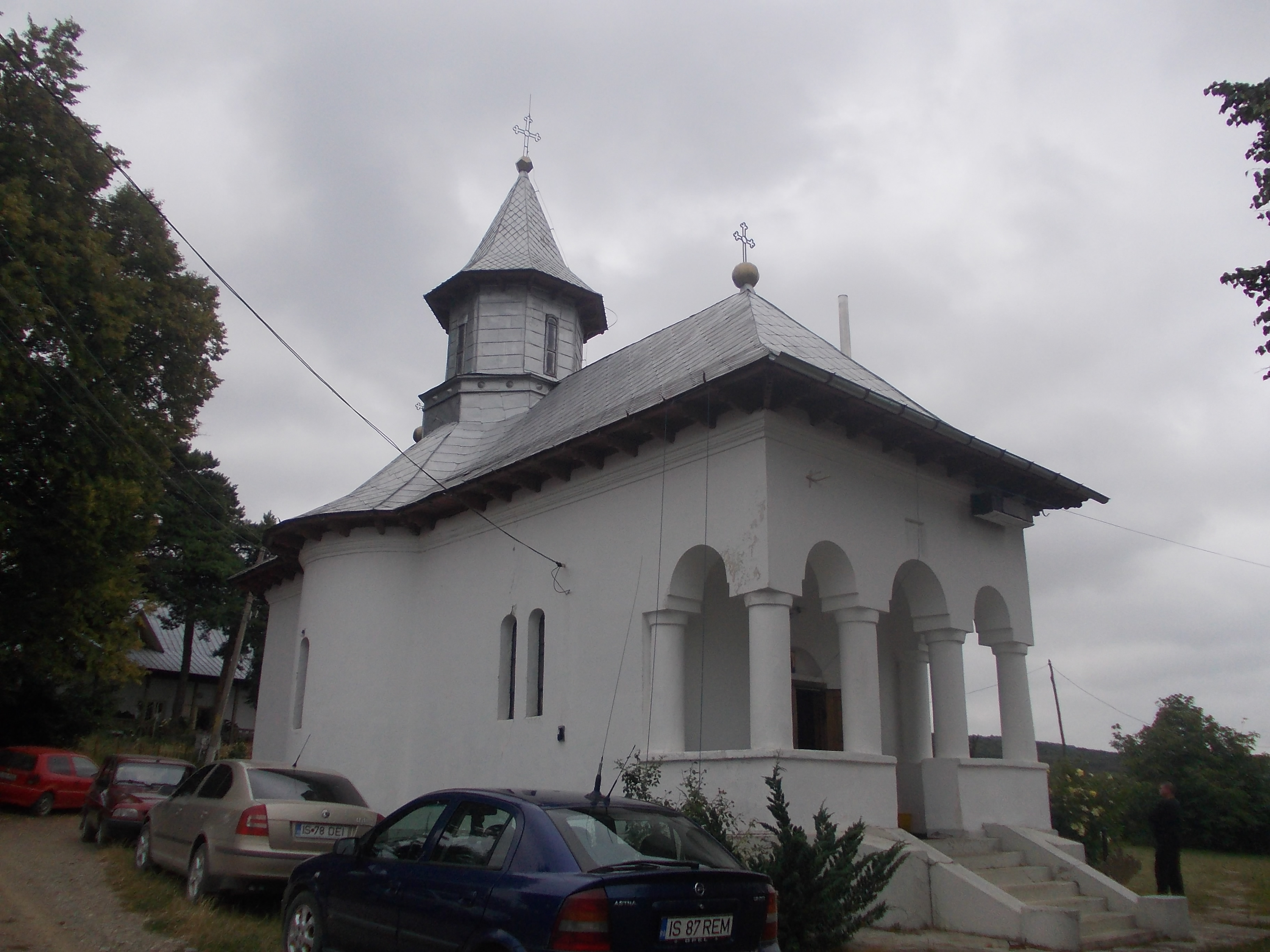
- The Boureni skete

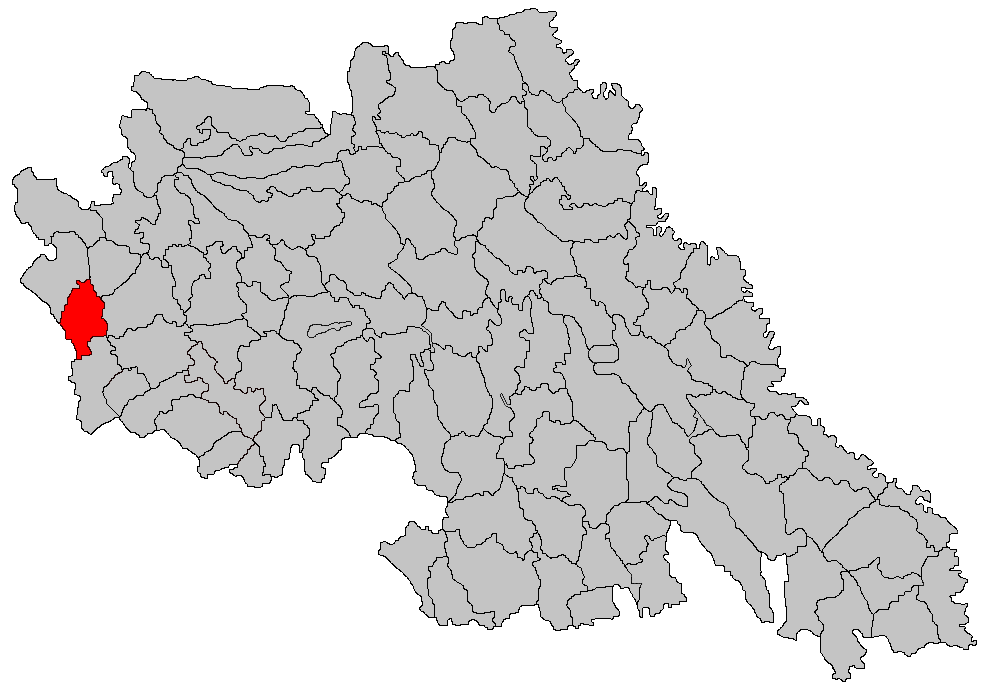
- Location in Iași County

- Location in Romania
- Coordinates: 47°15′N 26°37′E
- Country: Romania
- County: Iași

Government
  - Mayor (2020–2024): Constantin-Serioja Hobincă (PSD)
- Area: 36.59 km^{2} (14.13 sq mi)
- Elevation: 295 m (968 ft)
- Population (2021-12-01): 5,086
  - Density: 139.0/km^{2} (360.0/sq mi)
- Time zone: UTC+02:00 (EET)
  - Summer (DST): UTC+03:00 (EEST)
- Postal code: 707345
- Area code: +(40) 232
- Vehicle reg.: IS
- Website: comunamotca.ro

Moțca is a commune in Iași County, Western Moldavia, Romania. It is composed of two villages, Boureni and Moțca.

The commune is situated on the Moldavian Plateau, at an altitude of 295 m (968 ft), on the left bank of the Moldova River. It is located in the western part of Iași County, 84 km (52 mi) from the county seat, Iași, on the border with Neamț County. Moțca is crossed by national road DN2, which connects Bucharest to Siret on the border with Ukraine. The DN28A road branches off to the east, leading to Pașcani and Târgu Frumos, where it ends in DN28.
