= Nazarovka, Voronezh Oblast =

Nazarovka Назаровка
- Khutor
- Location within Voronezh Oblast Location within Russia
- Coordinates: 50°18′N 39°05′E
- Country: Russia
- Region: Voronezh Oblast
- District: Olkhovatsky District
- Time zone: UTC+3:00

Nazarovka (Russian: Назаровка) is a rural locality (a khutor) in Maryevskoye Rural Settlement, Olkhovatsky District, Voronezh Oblast, Russia. The population was 476 as of 2010. There are 6 streets.

== Geography ==
Nazarovka is located 17 km northwest of Olkhovatka (the district's administrative centre) by road. Yasinovka is the nearest rural locality.
