= Khokholsky (urban locality) =

Khokholsky Хохольский
- Urban-type settlement
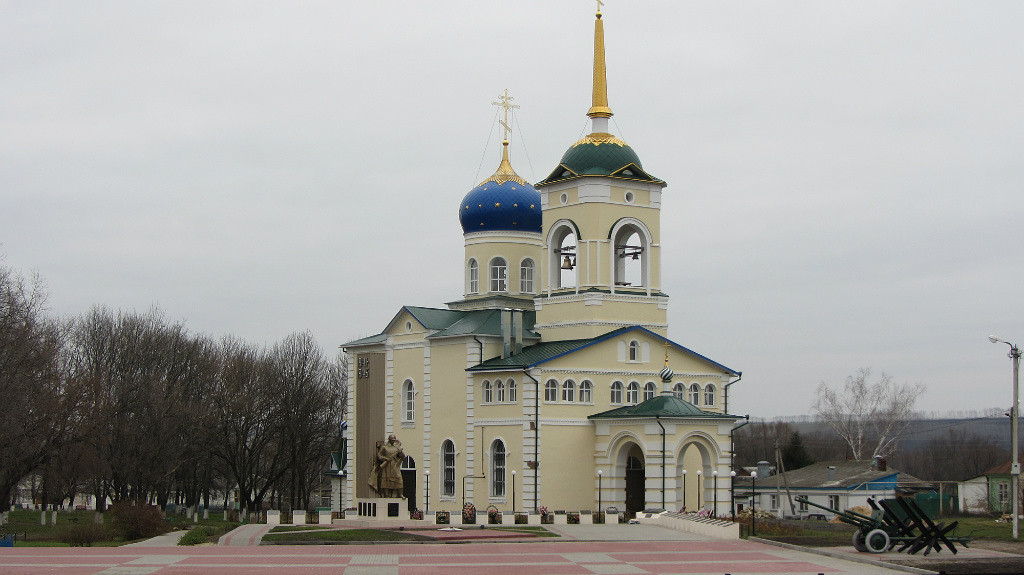
- Interactive map of Khokholsky
- Location of Khokholsky Khokholsky (Voronezh Oblast)
- Coordinates: 51.5772°N 38.7888°E
- Country: Russia
- Federal subject: Voronezh Oblast
- Administrative district: Khokholsky District

Population (2010 Census)
  - Total: 7,510
  - Estimate (2021): 7,954 (+5.9%)
- Time zone: UTC+3 (MSK)
- Postal code: 396840
- OKTMO ID: 20656151051

Khokholsky (Russian: Хохóльский) is an urban locality (an urban-type settlement) in Khokholsky District of Voronezh Oblast, Russia. Population: 7,954 (2021 census); 7,510 (2010 census); 7,885 (2002 census); 8,602 (1989 Soviet census).
