= Khokholsky District =

Khokholsky District Хохольский район (Russian)
- District
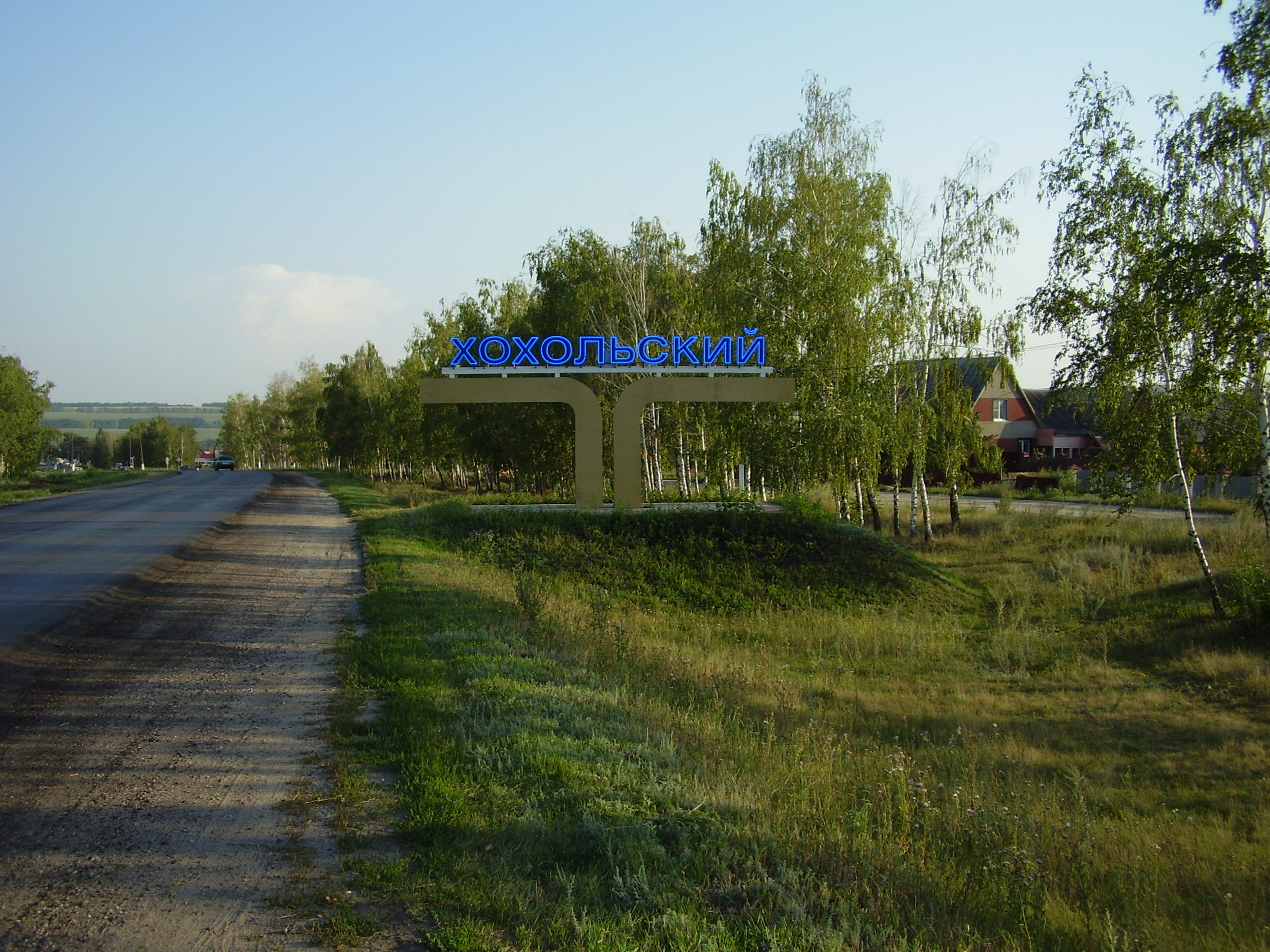
- Welcome sign at the entrance to the work settlement of Khokholsky, the administrative center of Khokholsky District

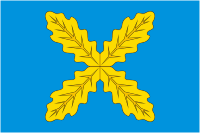
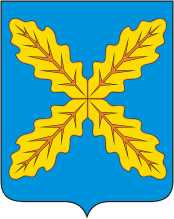
- Flag Coat of arms
- Location of Khokholsky District in Voronezh Oblast
- Coordinates: 51°34′N 38°46′E
- Country: Russia
- Federal subject: Voronezh Oblast
- Established: 1935
- Administrative center: Khokholsky

Area
  - Total: 1,451 km^{2} (560 sq mi)

Population (2010 Census)
  - Total: 29,814
  - Density: 20.55/km^{2} (53.22/sq mi)
  - Urban: 25.2%
  - Rural: 74.8%

Administrative structure
  - Administrative divisions: 1 Urban settlements, 11 Rural settlements
  - Inhabited localities: 1 urban-type settlements, 35 rural localities

Municipal structure
  - Municipally incorporated as: Khokholsky Municipal District
  - Municipal divisions: 1 urban settlements, 11 rural settlements
- Time zone: UTC+3 (MSK)
- OKTMO ID: 20656000
- Website: http://www.hoholadm.ru

Khokholsky District (Russian: Хохо́льский райо́н) is an administrative and municipal district (raion), one of the thirty-two in Voronezh Oblast, Russia. It is located in the northwest of the oblast. The area of the district is 1,451 square kilometers (560 sq mi). Its administrative center is the urban locality (a work settlement) of Khokholsky. Population: 29,639 (2021 census); 29,814 (2010 census); 32,889 (2002 census); 39,700 (1989 Soviet census). The population of the administrative center accounts for 26.8% of the district's total population.
