= Kamensky =

Kamensky (masculine), Kamenskaya (feminine), or Kamenskoye (neuter) may refer to:

== People ==
- Kamensky (surname) (fem. Kamenskaya)

== Places ==
- Kamensky District, name of several districts in Russia
- Kamensky Okrug, name of various divisions in Russia
- Kamensky (inhabited locality) (Kamenskaya, Kamenskoye), several inhabited localities in Russia
- Kamenskoye Urban Settlement, several municipal urban settlements in Russia
- Kamianske (Kamenskoye), a city in Ukraine

== Other ==
- Kamenskaya (TV series), Russian TV series based on the novels by Alexandra Marinina

== See also ==
- Kamensk, several inhabited localities in Russia
- Kamenski Vučjak
- Kamenskoye Plato
