= Kamenskoye Urban Settlement =

Kamenskoye Urban Settlement is the name of several municipal formations in Russia:

- Kamenskoye Urban Settlement, formerly a municipal formation which Kamenka Urban-Type Settlement with Jurisdictional Territory in Mezensky District of Arkhangelsk Oblast is incorporated as; in 2021 transformed to Kamenskoye Rural Settlement.
- Kamenskoye Urban Settlement, a municipal formation which Kamensk Urban-Type Settlement in Kabansky District of the Republic of Buryatia is incorporated as
- Kamenskoye Urban Settlement, a municipal formation which the settlement of Kamenka in Vichugsky District of Ivanovo Oblast is incorporated as
- Kamenskoye Urban Settlement, a municipal formation which the work settlement of Kamensky and two rural localities in Krasnoarmeysky District of Saratov Oblast are incorporated as
- Kamenskoye Urban Settlement, an administrative division and a municipal formation which the urban-type settlement of Kamenka in Kamensky District of Voronezh Oblast is incorporated as

== See also ==
- Kamensky (disambiguation)
- Kamenka Urban Settlement, a municipal formation which the town of district significance of Kamenka in Kamensky District of Penza Oblast, Russia is incorporated as
