= Mikhnovo =

Mikhnovo Михново
- Khutor
- Location within Voronezh Oblast Location within Russia
- Coordinates: 50°44′N 39°19′E
- Country: Russia
- Region: Voronezh Oblast
- District: Kamensky District
- Time zone: UTC+3:00

Mikhnovo (Russian: Михново) is a rural locality (a khutor) in Tkhorevskoye Rural Settlement, Kamensky District, Voronezh Oblast, Russia. The population was 73 as of 2010. There are 2 streets.

== Geography ==
Mikhnovo is located 11 km northwest of Kamenka (the district's administrative centre) by road. Tkhorevka is the nearest rural locality.
