= Kozki, Voronezh Oblast =

Rural locality in Voronezh Oblast, Russia

Kozki Козки
- Khutor
- Location within Voronezh Oblast Location within Russia
- Coordinates: 50°47′N 39°41′E
- Country: Russia
- Region: Voronezh Oblast
- District: Kamensky District
- Time zone: UTC+3:00

Kozki (Russian: Козки) is a rural locality (a khutor) in Markovskoye Rural Settlement, Kamensky District, Voronezh Oblast, Russia. The population was 106 as of 2010.

== Geography ==
Kozki is located 28 km northeast of Kamenka (the district's administrative centre) by road. Marki is the nearest rural locality.
