= Dalneye Stoyanovo =

Dalneye Stoyanovo Дальнее Стояново
- Khutor
- Location within Voronezh Oblast Location within Russia
- Coordinates: 50°42′N 39°16′E
- Country: Russia
- Region: Voronezh Oblast
- District: Kamensky District
- Time zone: UTC+3:00

Dalneye Stoyanovo (Russian: Дальнее Стояново) is a rural locality (a khutor) in Tkhorevskoye Rural Settlement, Kamensky District, Voronezh Oblast, Russia. The population was 67 as of 2010.

== Geography ==
Dalneye Stoyanovo is located 15 km west of Kamenka (the district's administrative centre) by road. Sitnikovo is the nearest rural locality.
