= History of Kropyvnytskyi =

Timeline of Kropyvnytskyi

- Tsardom of Russia/Russian Empire 1754-1917
- Ukrainian War of Independence
  - Russian Provisional Government Mar-Dec 1917
  - Ukrainian People's Republic Dec 1917-Jan 1918
  - UPRS Jan-Mar 1918
  - Imperial Germany (under occupation, de jure part of the UPR and Ukrainian State) Mar-Nov 1918
  - UPR Nov 1918-Feb 1919
  - UPRS Feb-May 1919
  - Hryhoriv Uprising May 1919
  - UPRS May-Aug 1919
  - AFSR Aug 1919-Jan 1920
  - UPRS/UkrSSR Jan 1920
- Ukrainian SSR Jan 1920-Dec 1922
- Soviet Union Dec 1922-1941
- Nazi Germany Nazi Germany 1941–1944 (as part of Reichskommissariat Ukraine, under occupation)
- Soviet Union 1944–1991
- Ukraine 1991–present

The history of Kropyvnytskyi starts with the human settlement in the area of the city, which is believed to have begun around the Middle Paleolithic. The area would then be inhabited by successive cultures. However, the modern founding of the city would come after the creation of New Serbia in 1751, when a fortress was requested to protect the area. The Imperial Russian government approved this fortress shortly thereafter; it would be called the Fortress of St. Elizabeth, with construction beginning on 18 June 1754, which is considered the founding date of the city. Settlements around the fortress would then pop up, with some early suburbs being Bykove and Permski. In March of 1764, under Catherine II, as part of a reorganisation plan, the territory of New Serbia was merged to form the Novorossiya Governorate, of which the fortress was made the capital until March 1765, when the capital was moved to Kremenchug. In the aftermath of this decision, the fortress lost much of its significance, although the settlement around the fortress grew significantly and eventually was designated as a chartered county town known as Yelysavethrad. The town was designated a city shortly thereafter in 1785, after the Fortress of St. Elizabeth was formally disarmed. After a period of large trade growth, with Yelysavethrad becoming one of the largest trade centres in southern Ukraine, the city was put under military-settlement administration in 1829, which it would remain under until 1861. Initially, in the 1800s, the city was hit by major disasters, such as fires that destroyed large parts of the city, although by the late 1800s the city gradually recovered. During this time, it rapidly expanded, becoming particularly known for its cultural significance in theatre.

However, during the subsequent Ukrainian War of Independence, which was part of the Russian Civil War, the city constantly saw action, changing hands between the Ukrainian People's Republic, Bolsheviks, Imperial Germans, White movement, and members of the Hryhoriv Uprising. The Hryhoriv Uprising in the city saw one of the deadliest pogroms during the war in Ukraine, which killed 1,300 to 3,000 Jews before it ended. Bolshevik control was eventually consolidated by 1920, and the city was annexed into the Soviet Union in 1922. In the aftermath of the civil war, the city's name was changed from Yelysavethrad to Zinovievsk in 1924, then to Kirovo in December 1934, and finally in January 1939 to Kirovohrad with the formation of the Kirovohrad Oblast, of which it was named the administrative centre. After the start of Operation Barbarossa during World War II, the city was captured by German forces in August 1941. During the occupation, the city was annexed into Reichskommissariat Ukraine. As part of the Holocaust, over 5,000 Jews of the estimated 14,641 pre-war population were massacred by German forces. The city was eventually liberated during the Kirovograd offensive in early January 1944 by the Soviets. After the collapse of the Soviet Union, the city became part of an independent Ukraine in 1991. In the early 2000s, the city became widely known in Ukraine due to its political crises, with frequent accusations of electoral fraud. There were also some attempts to rename the city, although calls for this would not become widely popular until post-Euromaidan. Like most city centres in Ukraine, the city would see widespread protests during Euromaidan from November 2013 until February 2014, which drew thousands of people. In the aftermath, as part of the decommunnisation in Ukraine, the city was subject to renaming because Kirovohrad was associated with the Soviets, which was approved in July 2016 under the name Kropyvnytskyi. During the 2022 Russian invasion of Ukraine, the city took in thousands of internally displaced people from the front, with the number amounting to 85,000 as of 2026. The city has also been the target of frequent air strikes since the start of the invasion, which have killed multiple people and destroyed residential buildings.

== Antiquity ==
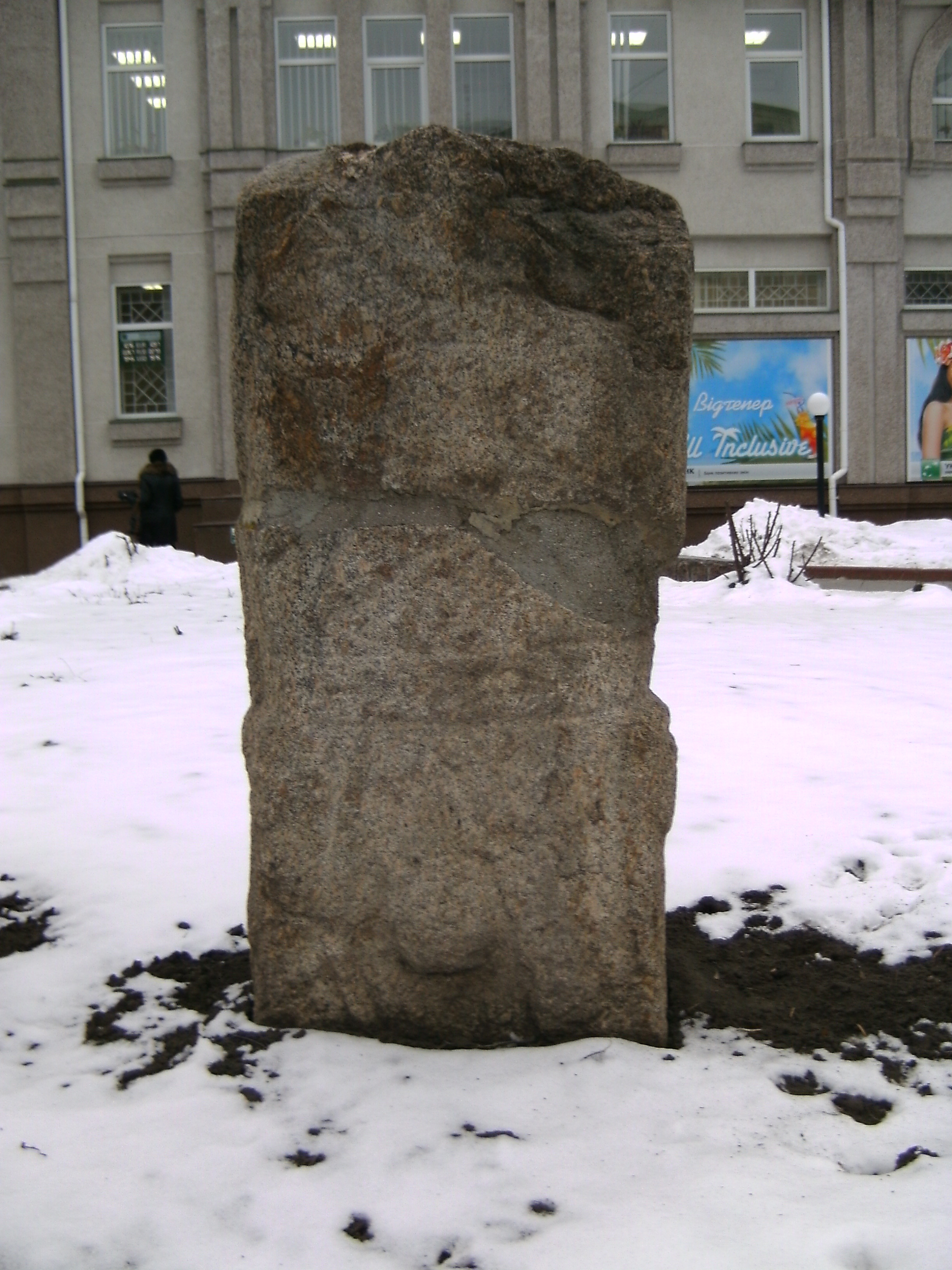
A Scythian stelae found in Kropyvnytskyi, pictured in 2011.

The earliest evidence of human habitation in the area around Kropyvnytskyi comes from the Stone Age, when a 1989 expedition by M. Maliuk found two flint tools, likely Mousterian, as they were dated to the Middle Paleolithic. However, no archaeological finds have been found that were dated to the subsequent periods until the Chalcolithic to Bronze Age era. Most of the evidence from these periods is kurgans, such as those that were found near the power station in 1928 and near Pravdy Avenue in 1987, which contained goods like pottery. The best-known kurgan in the city was found on Popova Street in 2004, which had 21 burials from different cultures, alongside a wooden ritual wagon. A notable non-kurgan find was from the Cucuteni–Trypillia culture, which included a flat copper axe, and a workshop from the Bronze Age that had four axes. In the Scythian era, not much evidence has been found due to grave-robbing, although three Scythian-era kurgans were found in 1884, and in 1992, in nearby Pervozvanivka, two more kurgans were found. Similarly, only graves of the Sarmatians have been excavated near kurgans that were placed near Yamnaya culture mounds.

During the Soviet era, the popular book History of Cities and Villages of the Ukrainian SSR claimed that prior to the founding of modern-day Kropyvnytskyi, there were already winter settlements in the area of the city used by Zaporozhian Cossacks as early as the second half of the 16th century. Historian Serhii Shevchenko corroborates this through a regional state archive, which said there had been a "been a winter settlement of the Zaporozhian Zavada", which is said to be the namesake of the present-day neighbourhood of Zavadivka. Another Cossack settlement said to be present in the area is Lelekivka, which was said to be founded by the Cossack Yakym Leleka of Tsybuleve, who by 1756 headed the areas near the Inhul. Other Cossack settlements in the area that have been claimed to be from the Cossacks include the neighbourhoods of Kovalivka and Balka, and a former Old Believer settlement.

== Founding of the fortress and city ==
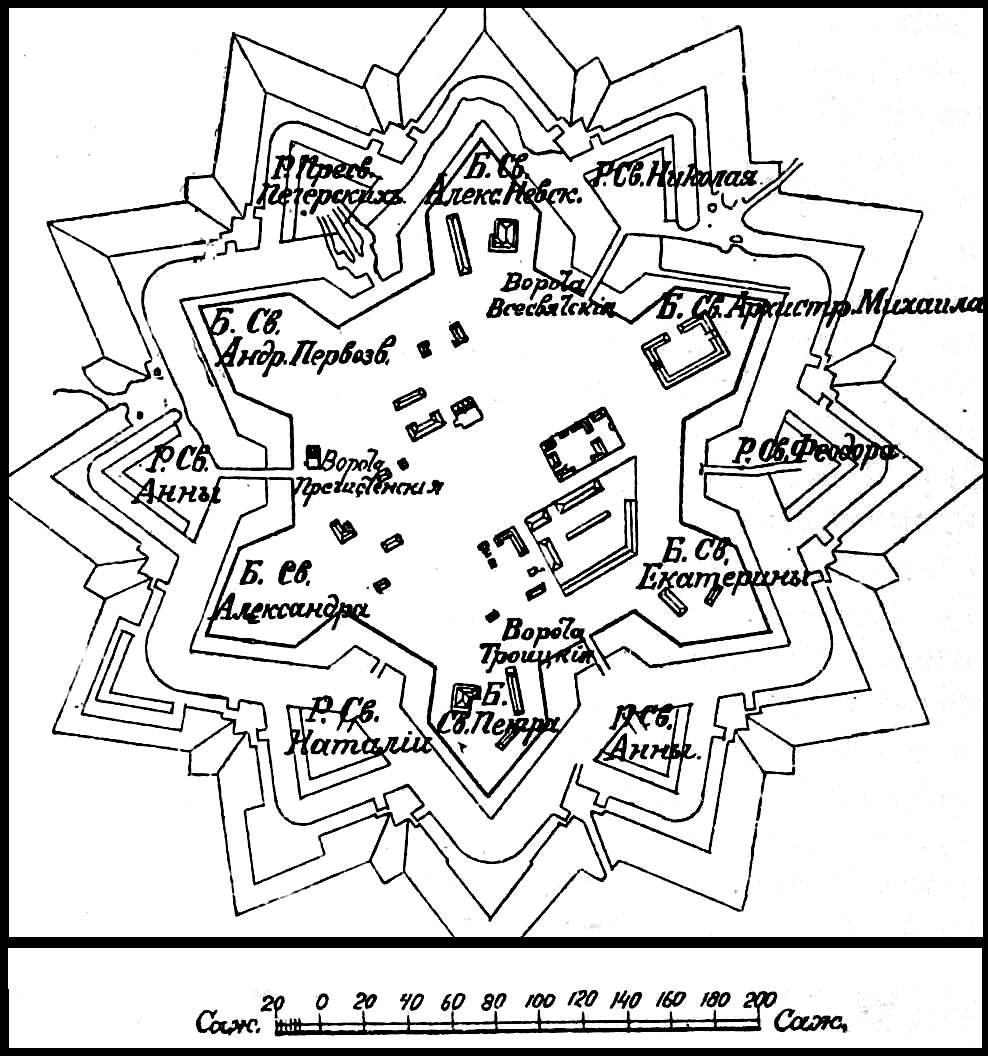
General plan for the Fortress of St. Elizabeth from c. 1912-13.

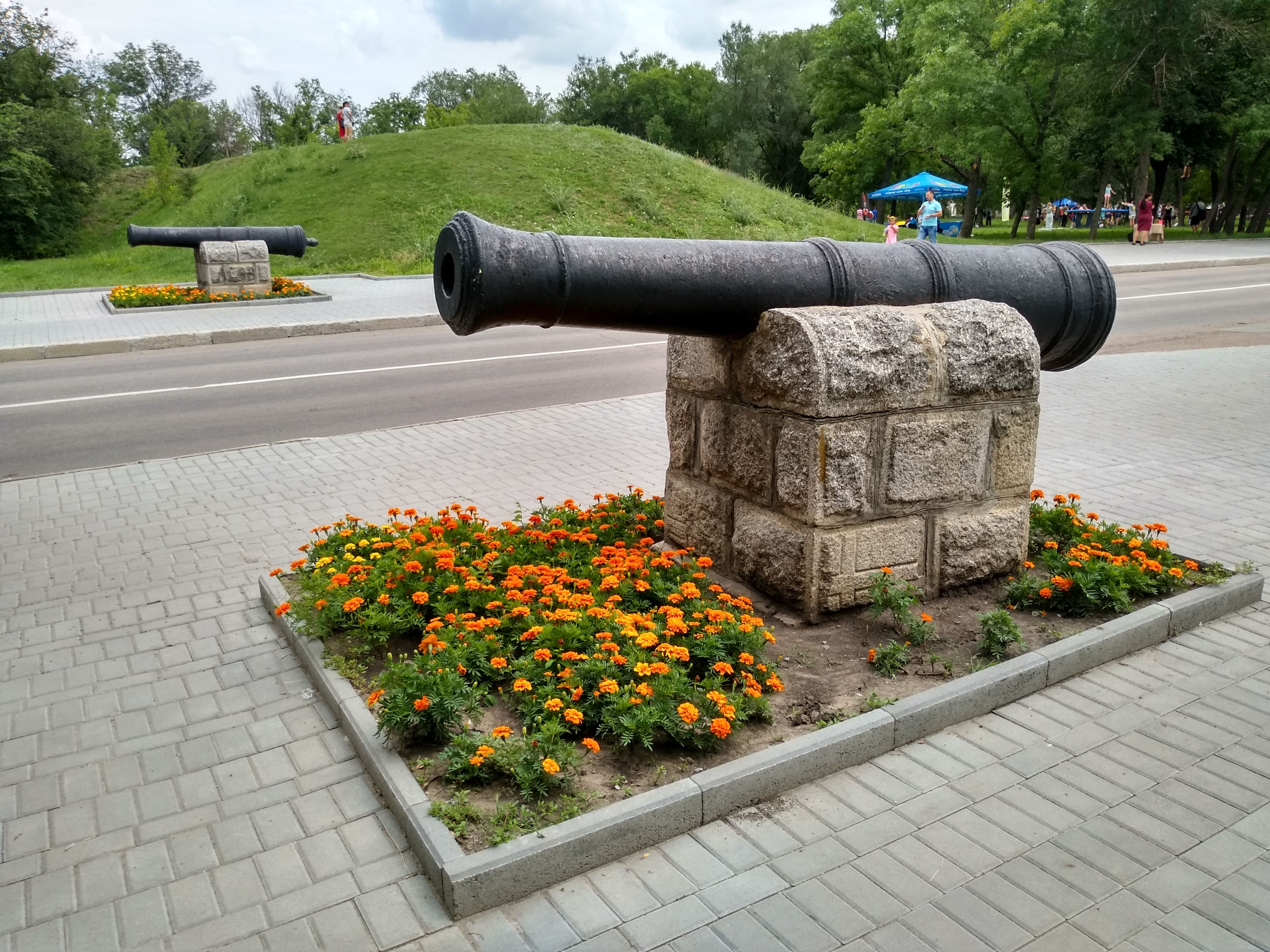
The cannons and ramparts left behind from the fortress.

The first mention of the name Yelysavet (25 April 1775).

In order to better protect the settlements of New Serbia upon their founding, in October 1751, General Jovan Horvat requested the Imperial Russian government to construct a fortress. The government approved this in decree No. 9919 on 24 December 1751, ordering the Russian Senate and Collegium to consider Horvat's plans, which they did, approving most of them in decree No. 9921 of 29 December 1751. In decree No. 9921, the government ordered that "an earthen fortress be made, which is to be named the fortress of St. Elizabeth", although it did not specify a location until the follow-up order by a charter on 11 January 1752, which further specified the fortress to be in New Serbia. This charter also specified that the area of the fortress would be under self-governance, and it also permitted both settlement and trade with the neighbouring states, such as the Crimean Khanate.

In February 1752, to get the project off the ground, Major-General Ivan Glebov was appointed chief commander of the project, with Horvat becoming commander of the regiments that would be settled into the area as part of New Serbia. Glebov, after being appointed, ordered that the surveyor Omelian Hurjev find a location in New Serbia for the site of the new fortress. However, Hurjev instead recommended that the fortress be on a hill about 200 sazhen from the right bank of the Inhul, although it was not within the territory of New Serbia (it was 4 km south of the border of New Serbia). Glebov justified the site being chosen because he said it would be good for trade, such as with the surrounding neighbours, that the hill was close to the river, it had forest; and that there was both stone and clay in the area. The Senate and Collegium then reviewed this in early 1753, from March to April, formally approving Glebov's proposal on 8 April 1753, adding that it would be a good location due to it being in the middle of two other fortresses, those at Novoarkhanhelsk and Mishuryn Rih. The earliest drafts for the fortress date to 20 April 1753, signed by Alexander Weiss, with a later plan dated to 16 May 1754 by an engineer-captain von Vitver also existing. (Note: Polishchuk notes that there is also sometimes a claim that the first draft for the fortress comes from Hurjev, together with two other students from Kyiv (Serhii Leontiev and Ivan Fedorov), although he says this claim is incorrect, as the map actually made by them was for New Serbia in general.)

The actual construction of the fortress was approved on 31 March 1754, with the ceremonial laying of the fortress starting on 18 June 1754, which is considered the founding date of the city. During the construction over the next few months, more than 5,500 workers were brought in, most of whom were Ukrainian Cossacks from the Myrhorod Regiment and Poltava Regiment. The chief builder chosen was Ludwig Johann Menzelius. Initially, the fortress was supposed to take 120 days to be built, but funds and war caused the fortress's construction to be paused in October 1754, when it was mostly completed, and it took until 1756 for work to resume, with artillery and manpower being assigned to it then. During and after the fortress's construction, many people settled in the area, including Old Believers, Serbs, Moldovans, Greeks, and Russians. The early suburbs that they formed were Bykove (after Captain Bykov, also known as the "Greek suburb") and Permski (after a regiment from Perm). Old Believer settlements founded include Zlynka and Klyntsi, although most resided within the fortress area. The first church was founded soon afterward in 1755, known as the Holy Life-Giving Trinity in the middle of the fortress; it was a wooden church and single-tier. That year, a magistrate also appeared, and a burgomaster was elected (Ivan Ivanchenko) - although the new settlement was not granted city status, some have argued this amounted to de facto Magdeburg law status. The settlement up to this point, until 1764, did not have an official name - a French map from 1754 by Robert de Vaugondy just lists the settlement as "Єлисавет Город", or Yelysavet town, which was in reference to the fortress, a practice common in Cossack naming. A year later, on 25 April 1755, Maksym Taran of the Zaporozhian Sich wrote "....єдучи чрез Гардъ до города Елисавету с трома бутами виномъ", thus referring to the town as Елисавету, or Yelysavet(a).

== Imperial Russian city ==
=== Late 1700s and end of the fortress ===
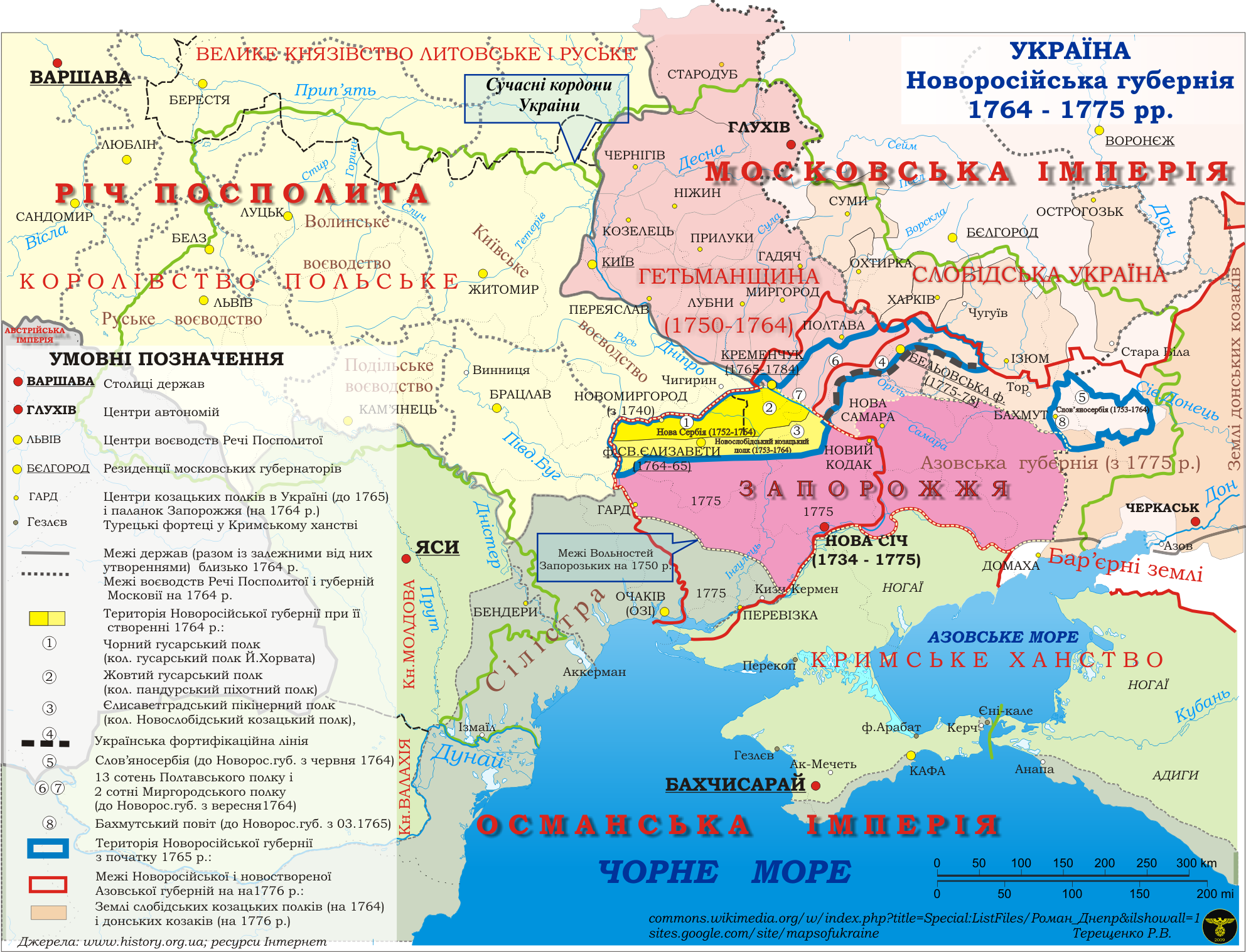
Map of the Novorossiya Governorate. In yellow is the original area of the governorate (1764), with "Fortress of St. Elizabeth" marked as the capital on the map from 1764-65.

On 22 March 1764, Catherine II approved a reorganisation plan for the new territories that had been submitted by Nikita Panin. Under this new reorganisation, the territory of New Serbia was merged with Cossack territory to make the Novorossiya Governorate, with its capital being the Fortress of St. Elizabeth within the city. The area was also made the capital of one of the provinces of the governorate, the Yelysavethradska province. This designation would not last long, though, as the capital was moved to the newly revived city of Kremenchug on 26 March 1765 following the liquidation of the Cossack Hetmanate. In the aftermath of this liquidation, the significance of the fortress fell sharply, with it then being designated in reserve and as a storehouse for the arsenal. The settlement itself was designated as a chartered county town of the namestnichestvo, and it was also the first time that the name Yelysavethrad was used to describe the settlement. Yelysavethrad, despite its loss in influence, already by 1776 recorded more than a thousand buildings and 4,720 people. Most of these people were Ukrainians, as the Greek community, although still having a functioning executive self-governing body in the town, had resettled in the newer cities in Odesa and Mariupol - by the end of the 1700s, only around 100 remained.

Development plans for the town began anew in 1784-84, which proposed doubling the town's territory, which was partially completed on the left bank side of the Inhul, including a new square. However, in February 1784, the Fortress of St. Elizabeth was formally stood down, and disarmament of the fortress began, which would take another decade. At the same time during that year, the Yekaterinoslav Viceroyalty was created, which Yelysavethrad was transferred to as the city seat of the Elisavetgrad uezd - which also served as official confirmation that the name of the city was Yelysavethrad after having been in common use since the liquidation of the Sich. Per the Charter of the Towns issued on 21 April 1785 after Yelysavethrad had been designated a city, a duma was formally established, which was housed at the corner of Nevska and Kupecheska Streets on the main square of the city. To accommodate the rapidly expanding city, a new city plan was drawn up in 1787 to double the size of the suburbs again near the Podil and to lay out new quarters. Like earlier plans, this never fully came through, although the layout was used when construction actually took place in 1790. The 1790 construction subdivided the left-bank side into quarters and created a new garden, while Bykove on the right bank was slightly moved, with a hospital and storage buildings also being added. By 1796, the city had become one of the largest trade centres in southern Ukraine, operating 4 brickworks, 4 tanneries, a candle works, two tallow-rendering works, and one soda works. This was slightly damaged during a great fire on 10 July 1798, which destroyed the government buildings, two churches, 72 shops, and multiple quarters of housing, with a notable loss also being the archives of the city up to that point.

=== Early 1800s ===
In 1802, the city was transferred to the Nikolaev Governorate (later renamed the Kherson Governorate), with it being the seat of one of the counties. The city was also absorbed into a military-settlement administration in 1829 under civil governor Mogilevsky. This did not have a big impact on the city, as the only notable change was that the duma chairman was now militarily appointed. The city was then hit by a series of disasters. Major fires broke out that destroyed shops on Perspektivnaya Street in 1812, with an 1813 fire also causing 100,000 rubles in damage. The largest fires occurred in April 1833 and July 1834, which together burned down more than half the city and cost over a million rubles, destroying nearly all of Permski and parts of Bykove. The reason these fires destroyed large parts of the city is that nearly all the major buildings were wooden, and it also took until the late 1830s for a fire company to be established under military administration. After the 1834 fire, Nicholas I of Russia also authorised an interest-free loan from the city's funds to assist those who had been affected by the fires. The city was then further destroyed when a major flood hit it on 27-28 March 1841, when the Inhul flooded the Kovalivka suburbs, reaching as far as Preobrazhenska Street, destroying two quarters of the housing in the low-lying suburbs and killing 20. Like the fires, interest-free loans were also given, although this time other cities sent relief funds, such as Odesa, and private individuals like Archbishop Gavriil. After these disasters, parts of the city were rebuilt, and street paving began in the city in 1842. Nicholas I also moved some corps and cavalry units to the city in the aftermath, and a cavalry cadet school was built.

=== Late 1800s and cultural prominence ===
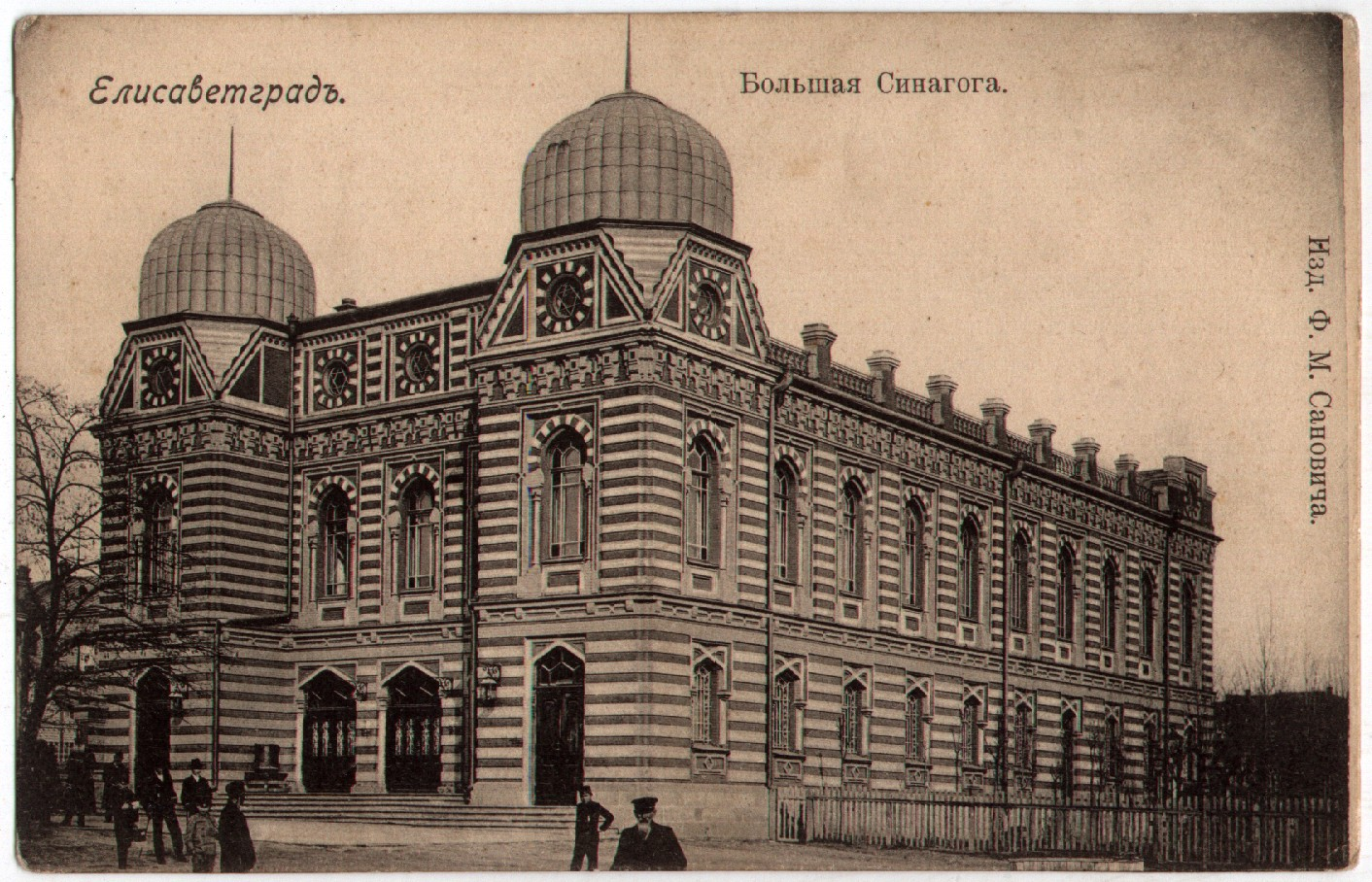
Great Synagogue in the city.

Elworthy Robert & Thomas, an agronomic machinery company, one of the largest enterprises in the city.

The late 1800s saw the city's rapid development. In 1861, the city's military administration ended, and it was returned to civilian administration under Lieutenant-General Pistelkors, along with Voznesensk and Novomyrhorod. In 1870, the city's duma was replaced with both a duma and uprava, while the magistrate was abolished. The first major development was the expansion of the school system, with a women's school being opened, called the Yelysavethrad Public Girls' Gymnasium, alongside a four-class boys' gymnasium. There was also the zemstvo's real school that had evening classes and free public lectures opened during this time. The next major development was the railway system, which was laid in 1869 to link the city to Odesa, Kharkiv, and Moscow, and which also marked the decline of the former fairs. With the establishment of the railway, multiple new banks and industries were opened, such as a municipal bank and a branch of the State Bank, and most importantly, the company Elworthy Robert & Thomas, which was opened in 1874 by immigrants from the United Kingdom. Elworthy employed around 1,600 to 2,000 people and was an agronomic machinery company, which quickly and rapidly expanded to become one of the largest agronomic machinery companies in Ukraine, reaching a capital of 8 million rubles and having branches in Uman, Cherkasy, Nikolaev, and Rostov-on-Don, among other cities, before the revolution of 1917. The next major development was the introduction of a water supply system, which was constructed in 1892-93, and an electric tramway under concession from Kyiv merchant Lev Izrailevich Brodsky, which started in 1897. This was also about the time the Jewish population began to swell as the city was located within the Pale of Settlement, growing from 8,000 in 1861 to nearly 24,000 in 1897. The Jews in the city had a large number of institutions, such as charitable ones, Zionist ones, loan offices, and polyclinics.

During this time, the city also became well-known culturally. By the 1850s-60s, there was amateur theatre in the city, which was staged at the real school and at a theatre under Mr. Trambetsky until the opening of a proper theatre at the Public Assembly building in 1874. Notable Ukrainian actors and playwrights then came to the city, such as Maria Zankovetska, Marko Kropyvnytskyi, Ivan Karpenko-Karyi, Mykola Sadovskyi, and Panas Saksahansky. Under Kropyvnytskyi, the Theatre of Coryphaei was founded in 1882 within the city, which is considered the birth of Ukrainian professional theatre, performing plays in the Ukrainian language at a time when it was banned. The theatre was also considered important to Ukrainian professional acting.

=== Early 1900s ===
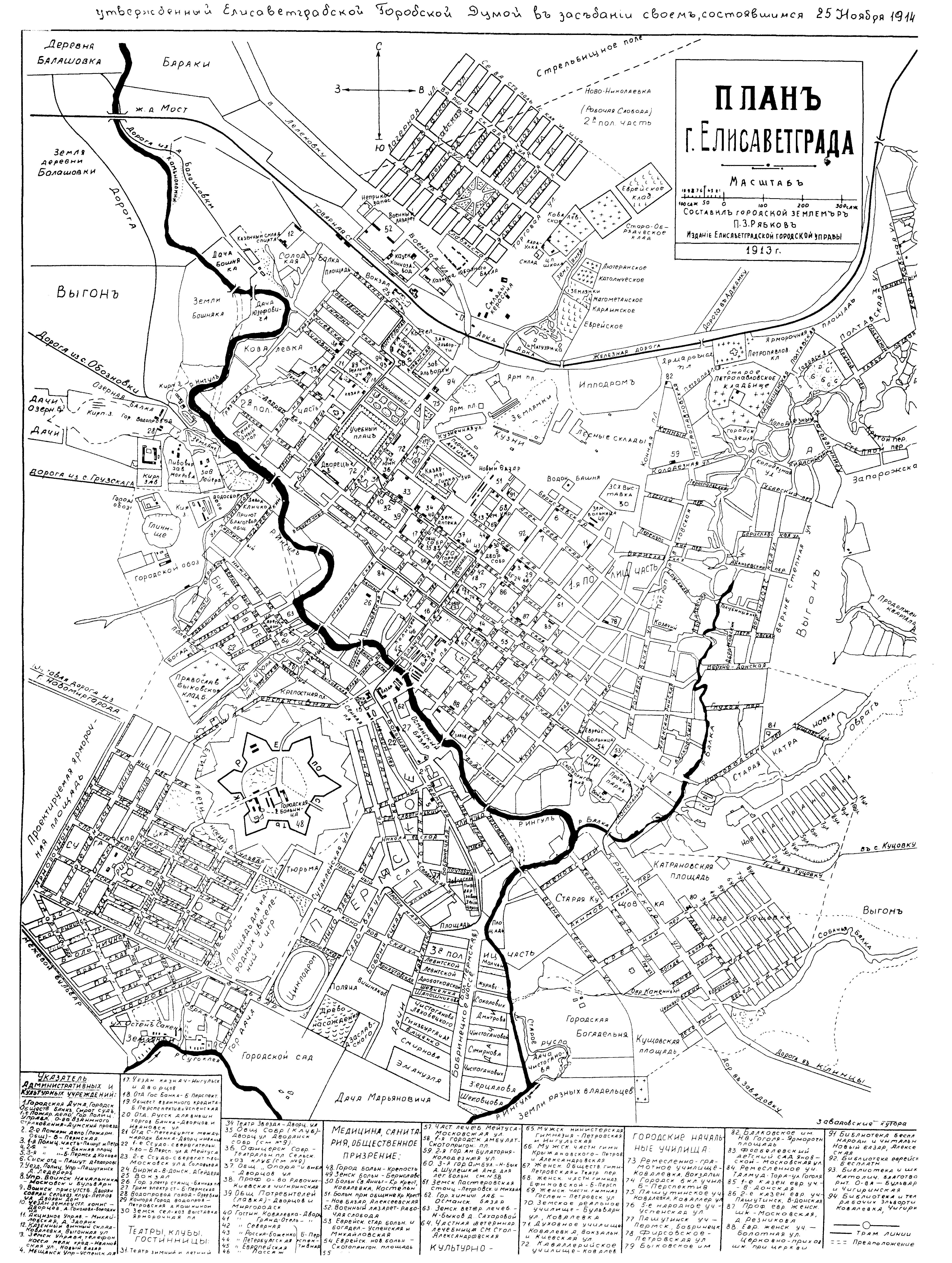
Map of the city from 1913.

After the death of mayor Oleksandr Pashutin in 1905, after having governed for decades since 1878, Mykola Ivanov took over the mayor's office. Ivanov's time was marked by a sharply authoritarian style, although he would not last long and was eventually succeeded by Hryhoriy Volokhin, who was a sympathiser of the Constitutional Democratic Party. Under these last Imperial mayors, construction still continued within Yelysavethrad's northern, southern, and southwestern districts, especially in the suburb of Mykolaivka. The population of the city was a majority Ukrainian and was Orthodox (57.2%), although the Jews by this point made up a significant percentage of the city at 39% of the recorded 75,751 people who resided in the area. The city's industrial enterprises were still growing significantly, with 351 enterprises that employed roughly six thousand people being recorded in the city in 1913, which produced products worth 12 million rubles. By far the largest enterprise was Elworthy Robert & Thomas, although other large enterprises included the flour mill, which processed 10 million poods of grain annually, and two breweries known as Zeltser and Laier, seven distilleries, a tobacco factory, and brick factories.

== Soviet era ==
=== Russian Civil War ===
==== 1917 ====
Memorial to Soviet partisans in the civil war.

After the February Revolution, a "united" left faction was formed, which proved very popular in the city and had three different groups: the defencists, who were the majority, a group of internationalists, and a very small group of Bolsheviks. News of the July Days was met with restlessness, although unlike in other cities, agitation did not start immediately. Amid tensions, a formal split of the united left was discussed as early as August 1917, particularly by the Bolsheviks, who claimed at the end of August that they were being restricted by other members of the faction. Due to this, the Bolsheviks formally left the United Left and formed their own organisation, later being joined by a group of Mensheviks, Left Socialist-Revolutionaries, and Dashnaktsutyun, who merged into the new organisation. Word of the October Revolution, in which the Bolsheviks seized power from the provisional government, spread a few days later, on 28-29 October 1917. At the time, the Soviet in the city consisted of a strong bloc of Ukrainian nationalists, other Mensheviks and Bundists, and then a faction of the Bolsheviks. Since the Bolsheviks did not enjoy as much support, they were unable to seize power in the city, and instead in December the duma recognised the newly formed Ukrainian People's Republic (UPR), after the UPR had proclaimed their own state and denounced the Bolshevik seizure of power.

==== 1918 ====
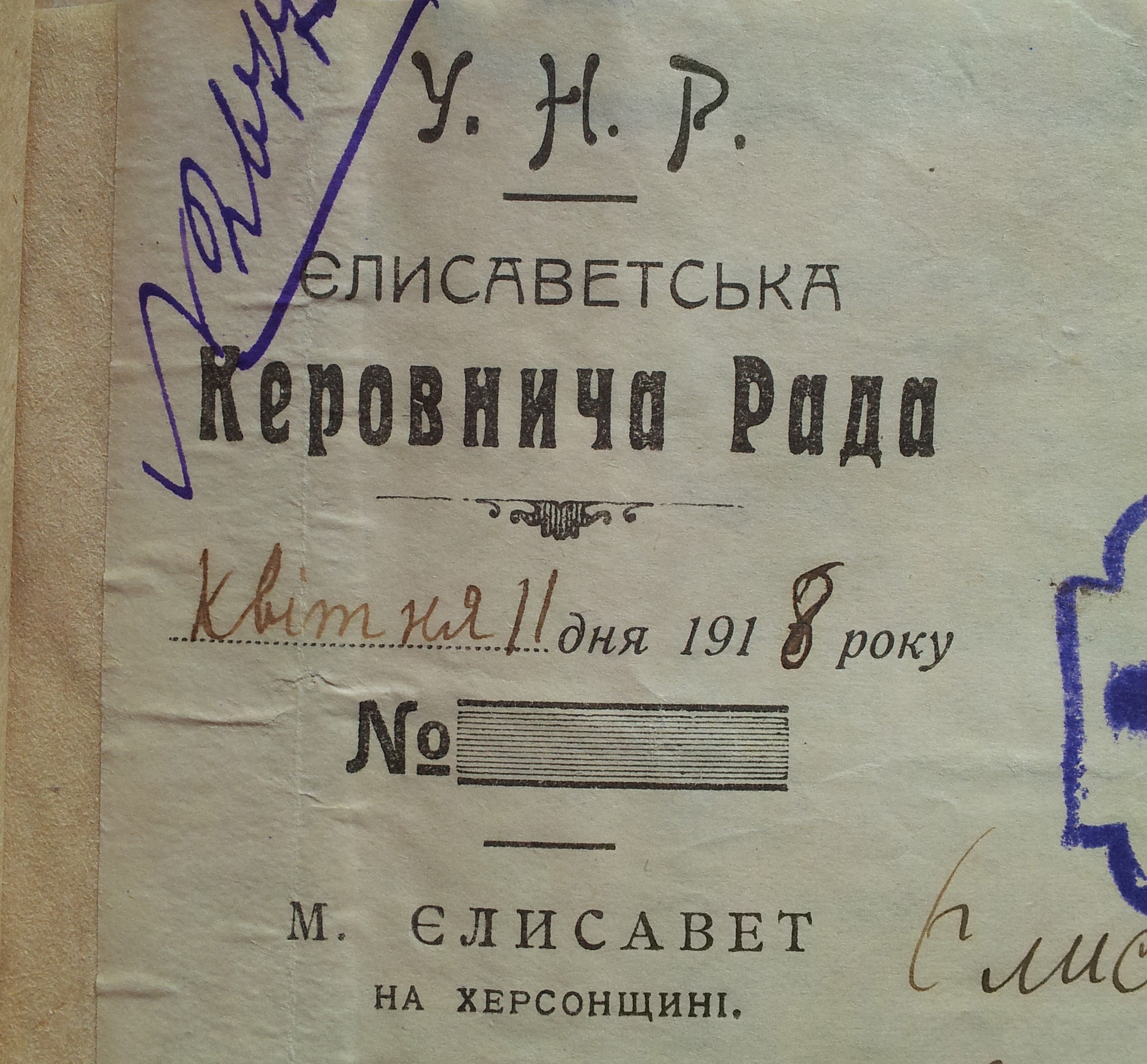
A letterhead from the governing council of the city when it was ruled by the UPR, April 1918.

By January 1918, the city was still under the control of the Central Rada and was primarily defended by a garrisoned haydamak troop named after Ivan Gonta. However, on 28 January 1918, Bolsheviks led by anarchist Maria Nikiforova arrived via rail, seizing control of the city alongside the local revolutionary committee. Sources differ on whether a fight actually happened, with some recording that it was a "bloodless coup", although others say that the Bolsheviks had fought against the haydamak for the city and opened fire on the garrison assembly hall, destroying the building. Upon gaining power, the Bolsheviks commonly referred to the city as Yelyzavethrad. Nikiforova was said to act like an Atamanshchina upon gaining power in the city, assassinating military commissar Colonel Vladimirov and looting the city's stores to redistribute to the poor and authorising bartering of goods. This went against what the Bolshevik revkom had decreed; after meeting with the revkom, Nikiforova reportedly criticized it as "excessively tolerant of the bourgeoisie" and threatened to disperse the revkom and shoot its chairman, as she opposed any form of government organ. The Bolsheviks responded by forcing her out of the city, although Nikiforova looted a local officers' college and armed her detachments with weapons from there afterwards.

In February 1918, the Treaty of Brest-Litovsk was signed, in which the Bolsheviks renounced their claims to Ukraine, leading to the start of Operation Faustschlag. Soon after, German and UPR forces neared the city, which led the Bolsheviks to evacuate and leave a power vacuum in which the "Provisional Committee of the Revolution" (VKR) temporarily took over as part of a Left Block alliance. The Druzhina then occupied the railway station from the VKR and sang anarchist songs, although peace remained for a few days. However, a crisis erupted between the anarchists and factory workers, leading the city's official government to attack the train station and start a small battle. The anarchists were heavily outnumbered, and so Nikiforova's forces withdrew to Kanatove; in the chaos, the Bolsheviks attempted to capture the city under Alexander Belenkevich, but they were swiftly attacked, and the unit was nearly wiped out, and many of the Bolshevik troops were taken as prisoners of war. Battling would continue on the outskirts of the city between the anarchists and the VKR, with lines of trenches being built, until 26 February 1918, when Nikiforova's anarchists received reinforcement from the Bolsheviks in Kamensk and from Mikhail Artemyevich Muravyov's troops. The VKR attempted to send emissaries to the Germans and UPR, but did not have enough time and left the southern entrance of the city unguarded, leading to an armoured train under the Bolshevik Andrii Polupanov entering the city, with the anarchists soon following and taking full control from the VKR.

However, as the Germans and UPR drew closer, the Bolsheviks eventually withdrew from the city on 19 March 1918, with the forces arriving on 22 March 1918. Although nominally under German-Austro-Hungarian occupation, the city duma still continued to operate, and the city remained de jure part of the UPR. After regaining the city, as part of administrative reform, the city became the capital of the Nyz region. There were also proposals by the Free Cossacks, at the time to rename the city Nyzovyi, although this never caught on, and instead the Ukrainians used Yelysavet (Elizabeth) formally, or also Lysavet/Lyzavet informally. The Ukrainian State took over as the de jure power from the UPR in April 1918, although this did not change much. A Bolshevik underground continued to exist in the city, although most activities were focused on the peasantry in the surrounding villages, which sparked an uprising in the nearby village of Trynadtsyate. The city also served as a waypoint for prisoners of war, who were sent to the city's hospitals.

Hetmanate power did not last long, however, as the city became one of the first to pass to UPR control as part of the Anti-Hetman Uprising. On 20 November 1918, a battalion under Mykhailo Verbytskyi and a battalion of troops from Galicia that were formerly with the Austro-Hungarian forces took over the city for the UPR, with Verbytskyi becoming city commandant. On 22 November, the zemstvo convened and formally declared UPR power in the city. During this time, strikes started at Elworthy, which the management eventually submitted to, while the military commandant, Kovalenko, pushed for mobilisation. At the time, there were three units stationed in the city: the 1st Sich Yelysavet Regiment, the 2nd March Sich Regiment, and a cavalry division, all under Verbytskyi's control. However, by December, anarchy flared again, especially when a clash broke out between German troops who were returning to Germany after the defeat of the country in World War I and Ukrainian troops, which killed 26. Verbytskyi, who had taken on more power and called himself the "otaman of the Sich division", then declared martial law. Yelysavet became the temporary administrative centre of the Kherson Governorate within the UPR in late December, also after other cities fell or were surrounded by the Whites and Bolsheviks.

==== 1919 ====
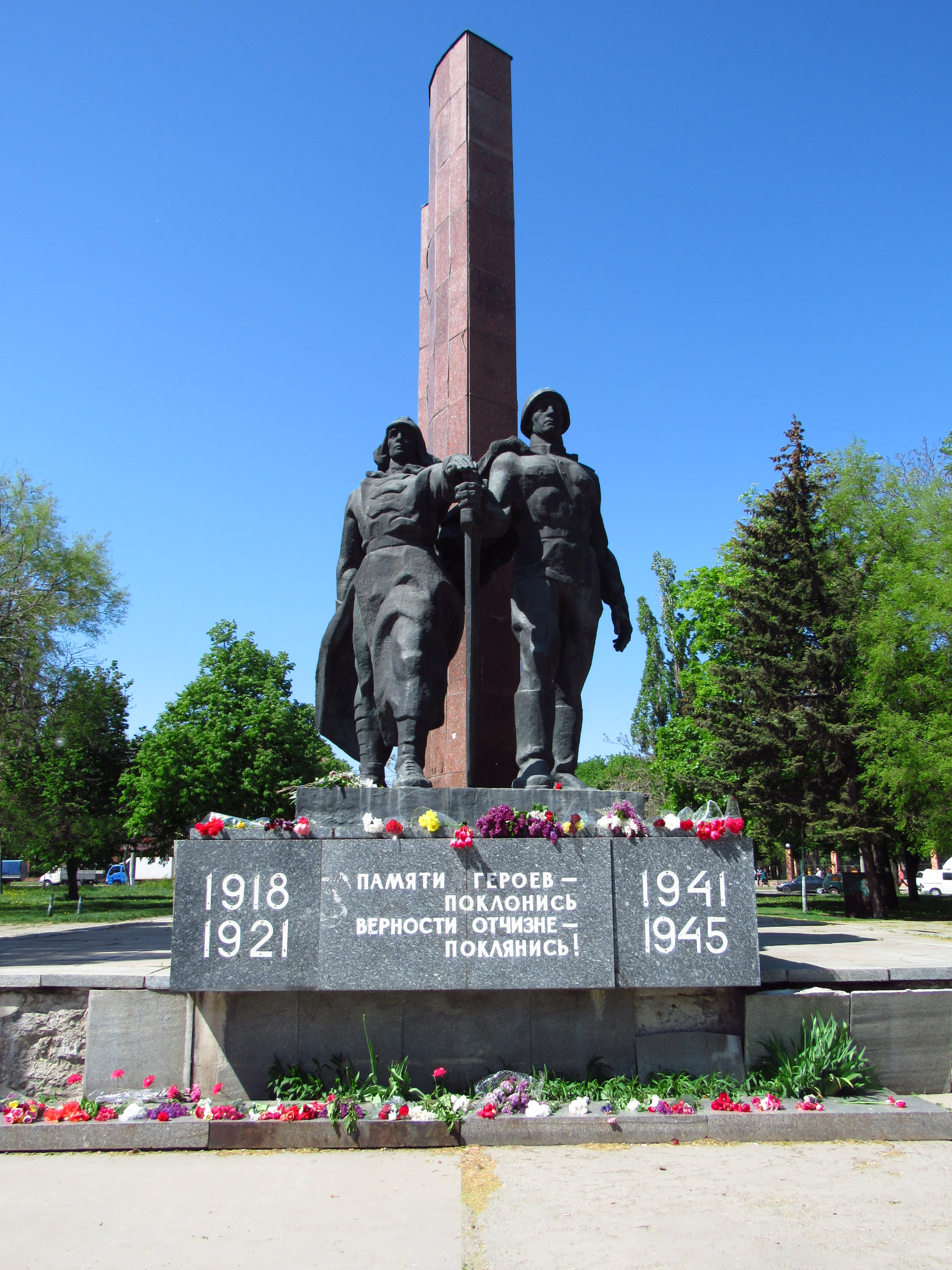
Monument to soldiers of the civil war and also World War II.

In early February 1919, a Military-Revolutionary Committee was once again formed to start an uprising against the UPR in the city. On the night of 1 February 1919, they seized the headquarters of the UPR at the Palace Hotel and declared themselves the authority in the city, although the committee's influence was not absolute. The forces still loyal to the UPR - largely the Galician regiment - seized on this and, joined by parts of the 1st Sich Regiment, retook the Palace Hotel and disarmed the home guard. In retaliation for the uprising, the UPR forces started a pogrom against the Jews, looting shops on Jewish streets, although they were eventually stopped by the militia chief. On 4 February, after the committee received reinforcements from an artillery unit at the Fortress of St. Elizabeth, they opened fire on UPR forces and pushed the UPR forces back to the cadet school. Faced with mounting pressure within the city and with the Bolsheviks advancing to Znamianka as part of the Soviet invasion of Ukraine, the UPR forces decided to evacuate from the city. A Bolshevik cavalry detachment under Pavlo Tkachenko entered the city on 6 February from Znamianka, which was around the same time that Nykyfor Hryhoriv joined the Bolshevik side to strengthen the Bolshevik defences in the city.

A month later, Hryhoriv rebelled against the Bolsheviks, issuing his own universal call for the Ukrainian people to seize power from the Bolsheviks on 7 May. The regiments of Hryhoriv then took power in the city the following day, disarming the Bolshevik battalion and destroying the premises of the Bolshevik party. The most notable action during this time occurred on 15 May, when Hryhoriv's forces started a pogrom, which was one of the deadliest of the war in Ukraine. According to accounts, the pogrom began as soon as Hryhoriv's forces consolidated control over the city after fighting the Bolsheviks outside of the city, with many inhabitants of the city joining them. Peasants from neighbouring villages also came to plunder Jewish property during the massacres, with the massacres being primarily committed by soldiers, sailors, and criminals. Many Jews attempted to hide in the houses of Christian acquaintances, which worked as the forces would not touch Christian households. The first wave of killings began on 15-16 May until they were temporarily stopped by a detachment of workers, but it was renewed on 17 May until it died down that night. In total, anywhere from 1,300 to 3,000 Jews were killed between then and 20 May. On 21-22 May 1919, Bolshevik forces retook the city from Hryhoriv's troops. Nevertheless, even after this, forces under Hryhoriv remained around the city until July, when on 13 July, 2,000 of his forces attempted to take the city. They managed to seize the railway station, prison, and commissariat before withdrawing a few hours later for the final time. The city was later seized by the White movement on 17 August 1919 by members of the 1st Caucasus Division, although the city remained in contention for some time due to the Makhnovists until the 4th and 5th divisions of the Volunteer Army pushed them back in September.

==== 1920 ====
In early January 1920, the front of the Whites started collapsing, and insurgents associated with the UPR led by former commander Guliy-Gulenko rapidly advanced towards the city after capturing Znamensky Station. Coming in from Kanatov, they first attacked the train station, and although the Whites attempted to defend it with an armoured train, they were unable to because the insurgents had severed the railroad tracks. Thus, the Whites quickly withdrew to the northern part of the city, despite attempts to negotiate with the UPR insurgents and join forces. The UPR insurgents, however, agreed to team with the advancing Bolsheviks to retake the city, joining forces with the 535th Soviet Regiment. The insurgents were assigned to the left side of the city, the Bolsheviks to the right. After both sides suffered heavy casualties from a strong White defense, the Bolsheviks eventually retreated, which forced the insurgents to do the same. Eventually, after the initial loss, more insurgents joined, including Ukrainians who had deserted from the Soviet Army. After this, the insurgents fought for a week to attempt to recapture the city until the Whites eventually retreated, which led the combined Bolshevik-insurgent forces to recapture the city. The insurgents then withdrew under the command of the UPR, joining the Zaporizhzhia Group for the First Winter Campaign, leaving the city to the Bolsheviks for the last time and establishing Soviet power.

==== Maps ====
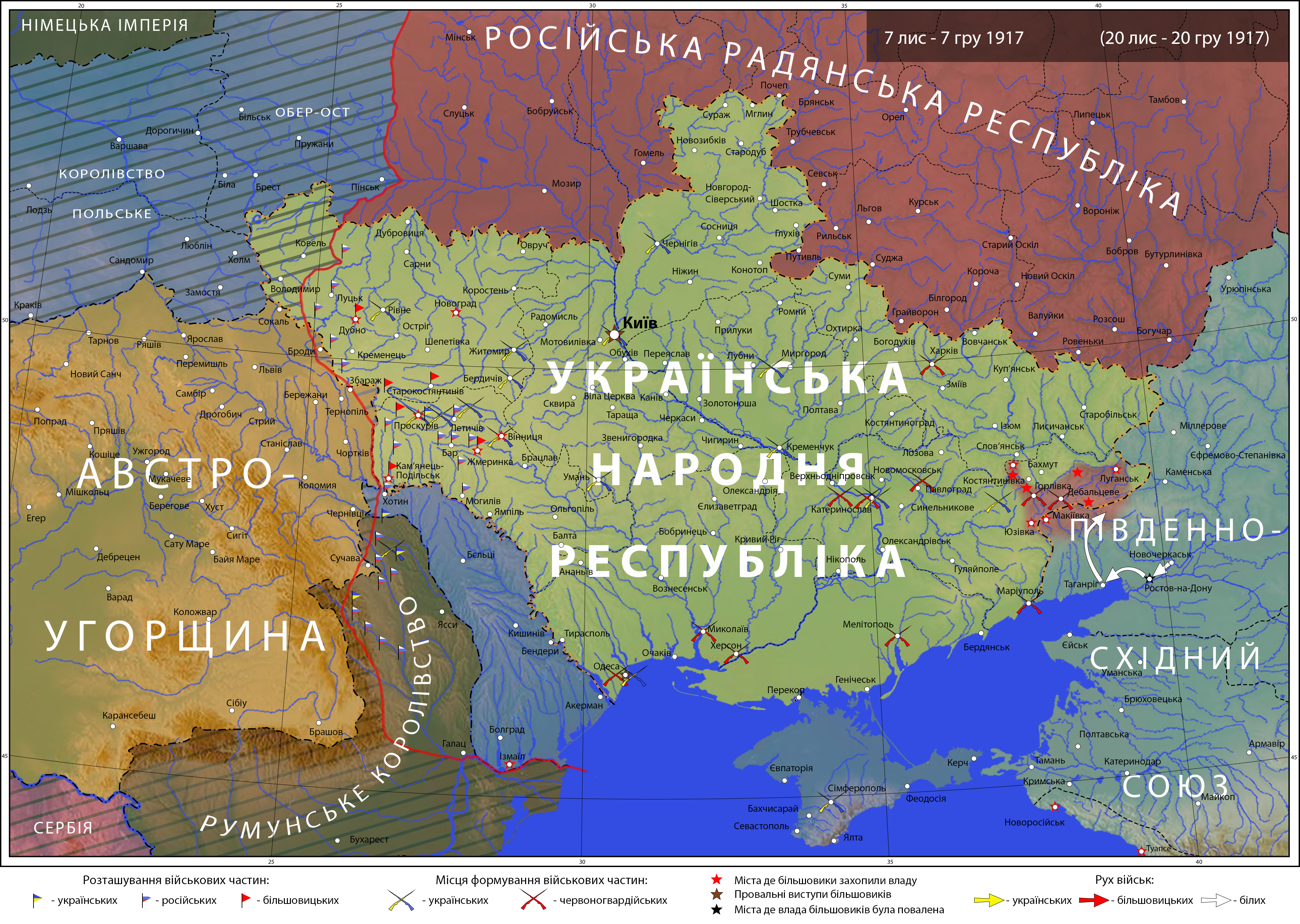
Situation in Ukraine from November to December 1917. The UPR has taken control of Yelysavethrad.

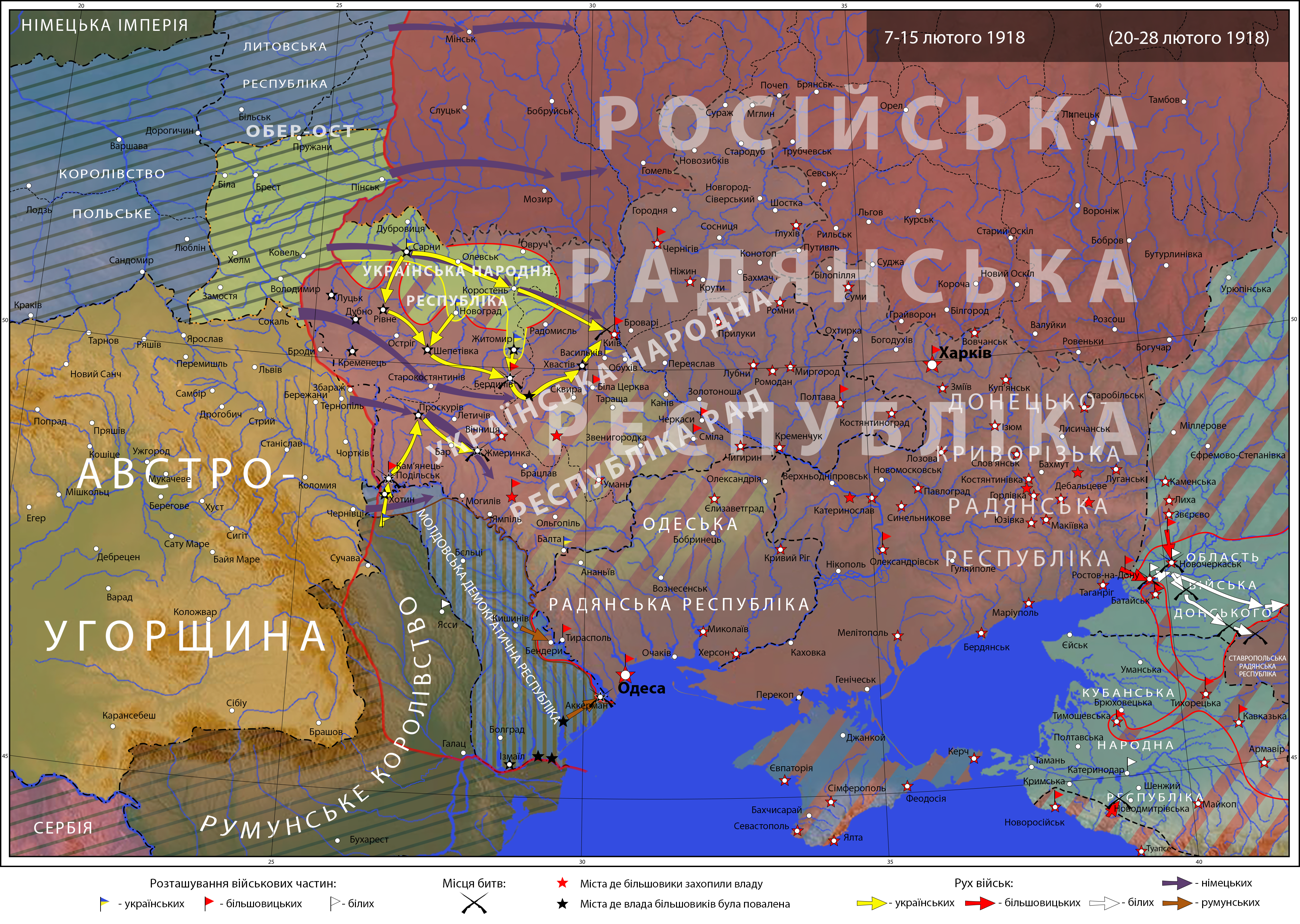
Situation in Ukraine from February 1918. The UPR has recently lost control of the city to the Bolsheviks.

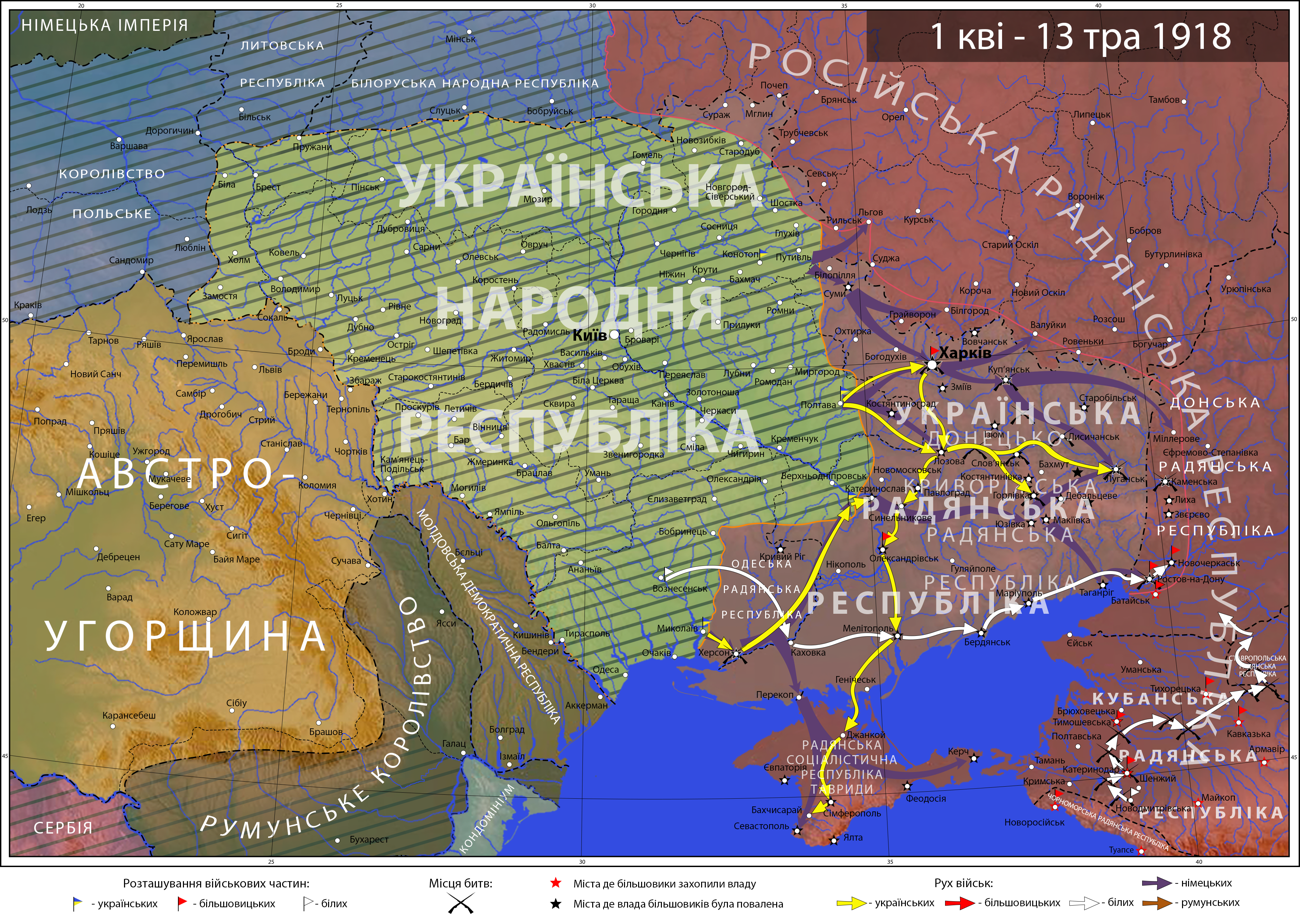
Situation in Ukraine from April to May 1918. The UPR, together with the Central Powers, retake Yelysavethrad.

Situation in Ukraine in March 1919. The Bolsheviks have retaken control of Yelysavethrad.

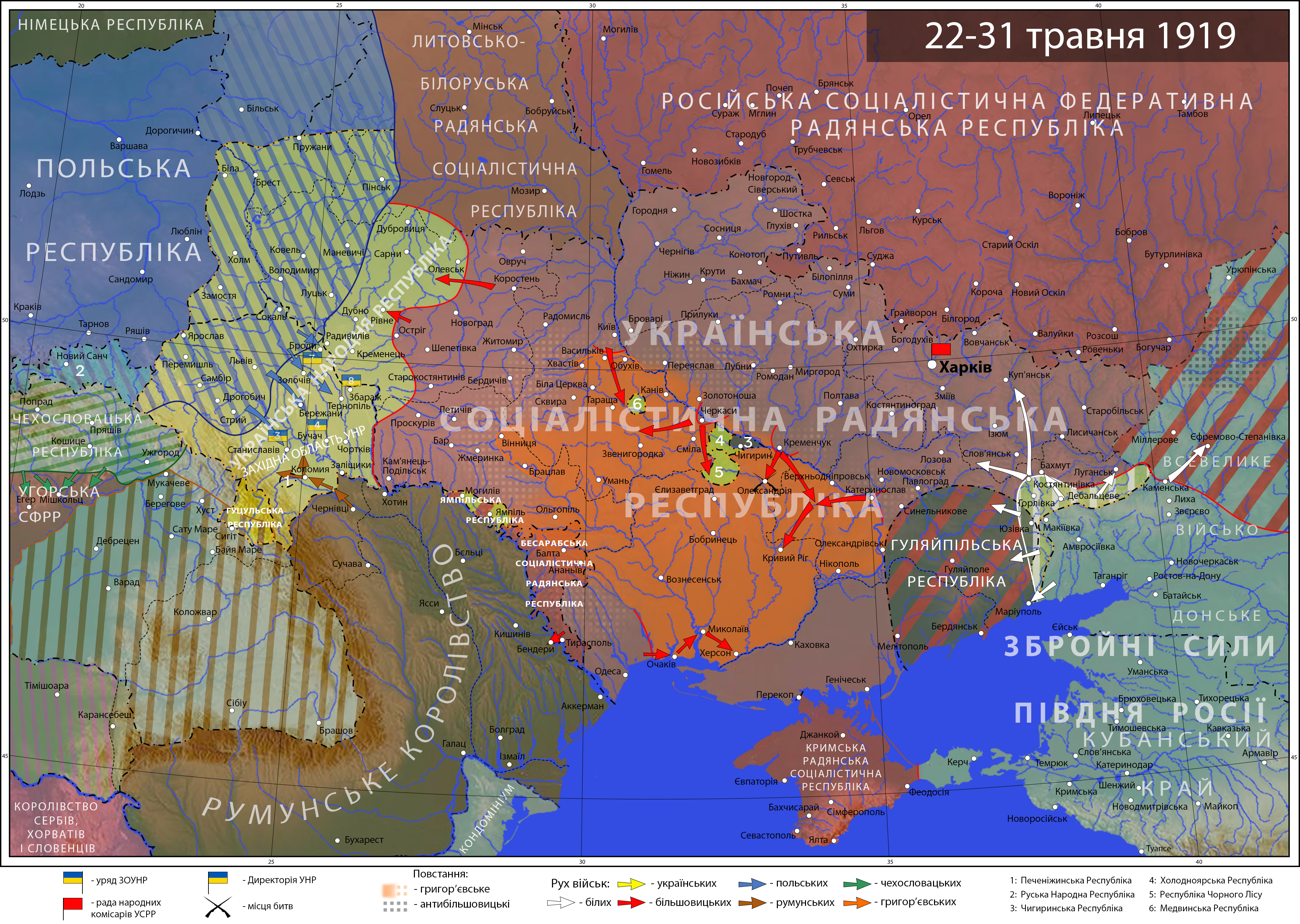
Situation in Ukraine in May 1919. Nykyfor Hryhoriv turns on the Bolsheviks and leads a peasant uprising known as the Hryhoriv Uprising, marked in orange, taking the city.

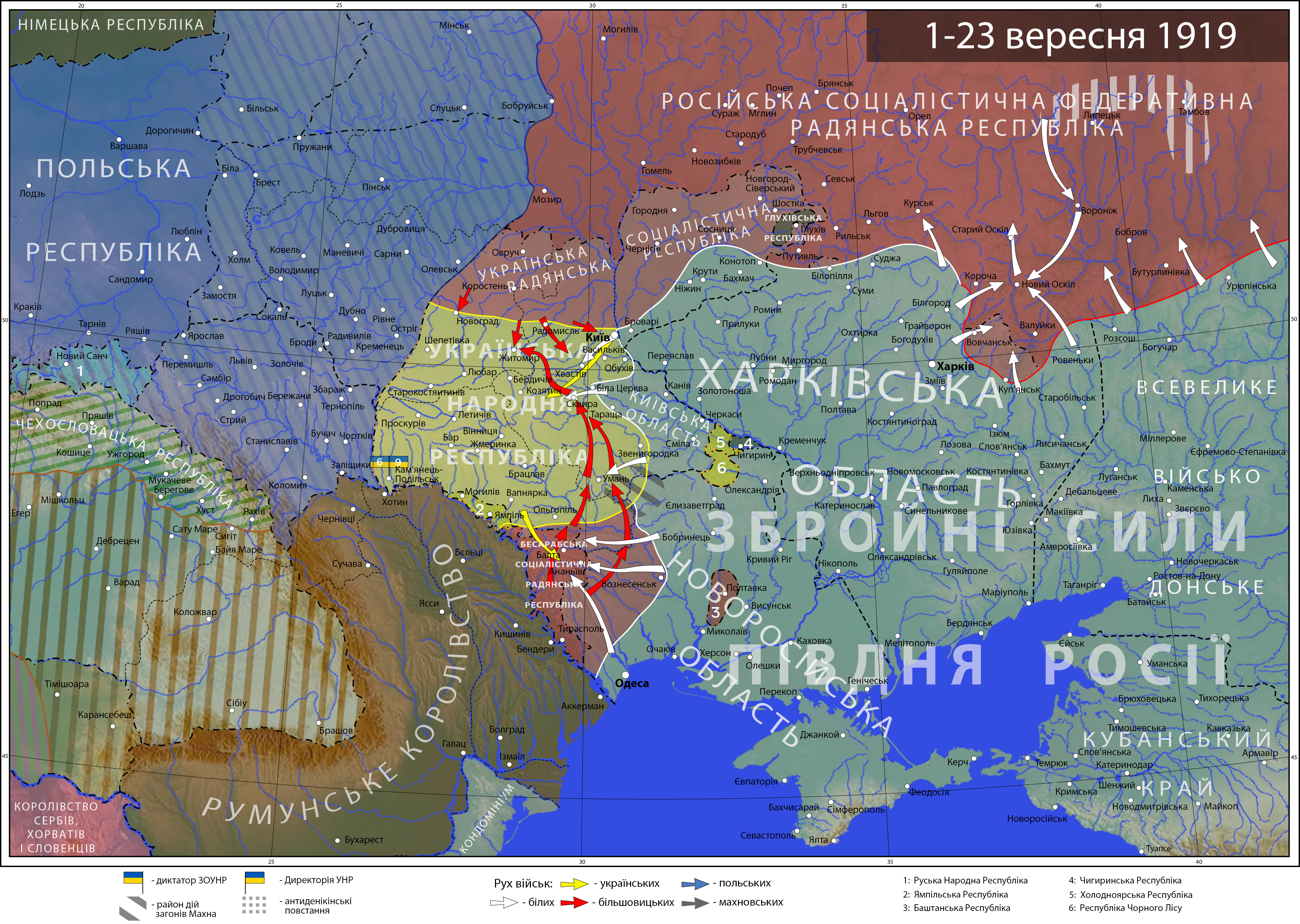
Situation in Ukraine in September 1919. After the Bolsheviks retook control from Hryhoriv, the White movement took the city a few months later.

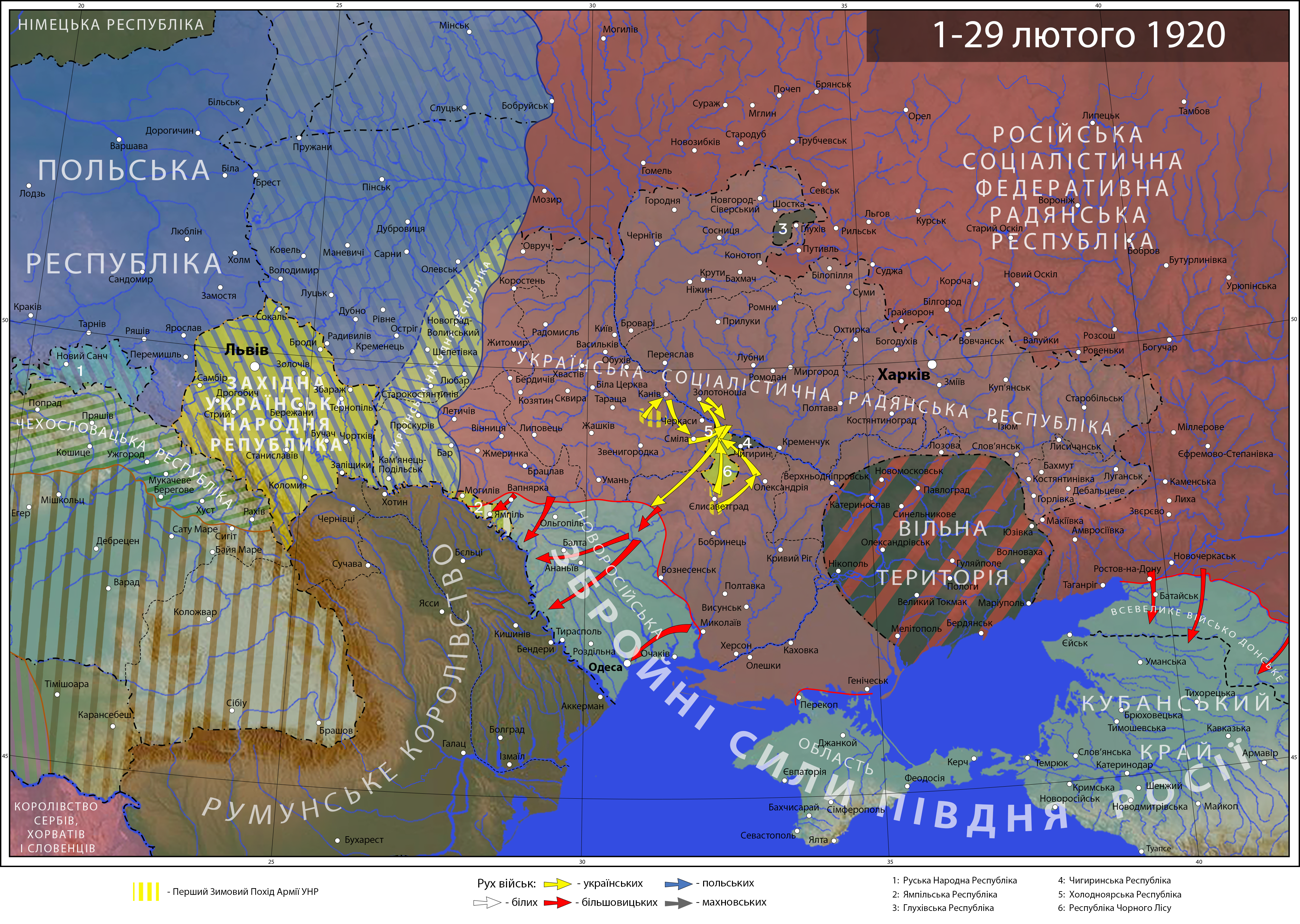
Situation in Ukraine in February 1920. The Bolsheviks have taken control of the city for a final time

=== Interwar period ===
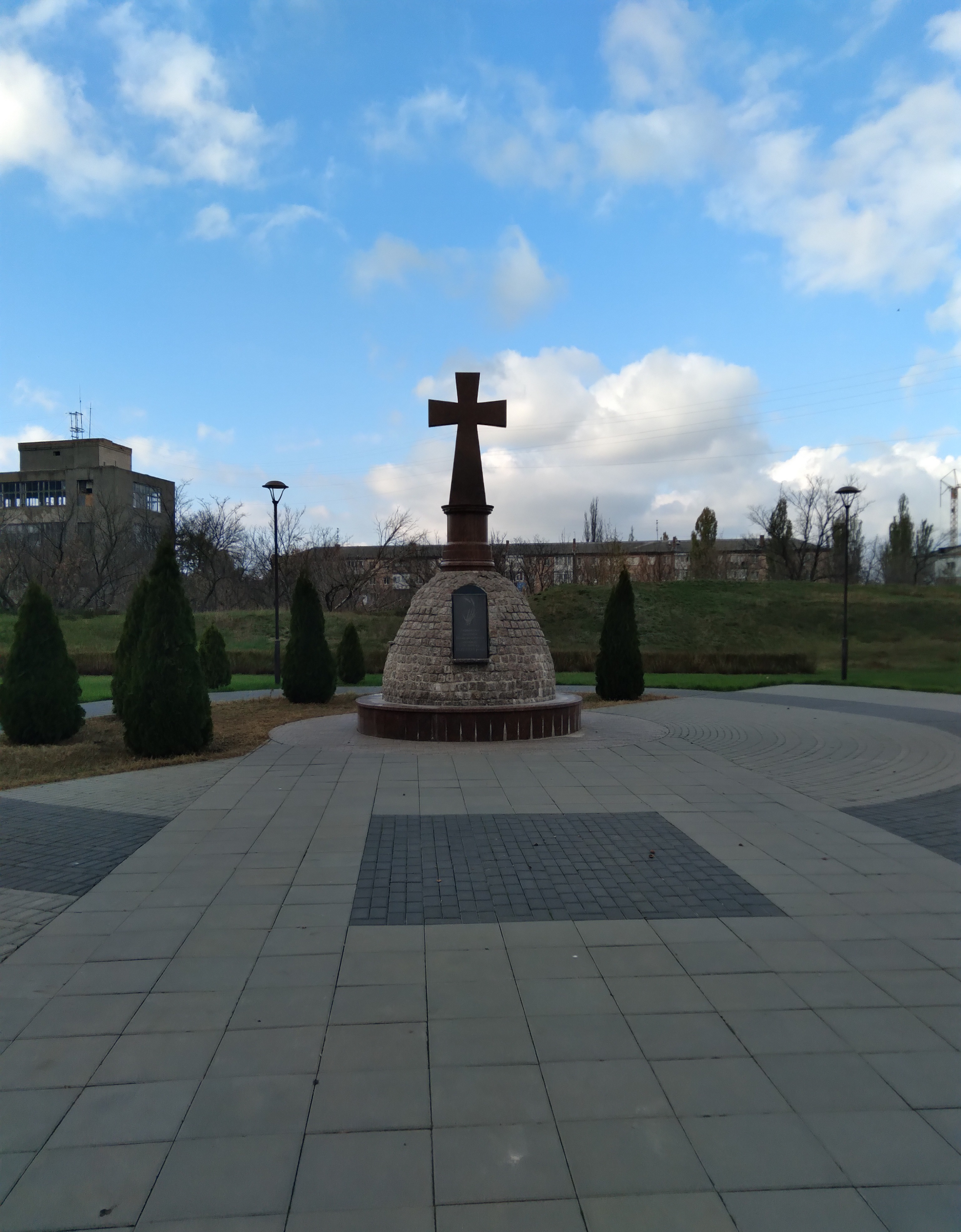
Monument in honour of victims of the Holodomor.

After the city was regained by the Soviets, it was incorporated back into the Mykolaiv Governorate until 1922, then briefly into the Odesa Governorate, and finally into the Lysavethrad okruha for some time. After okruhas were abolished in 1930, the city became part of Odesa Oblast until 1937, then Mykolaiv Oblast for two years, and then finally it became the administrative centre of the newly created Kirovohrad Oblast in 1939. During these administrative changes, the name of the city was also changed multiple times. The first time was on 7 August 1924, when VUTsVK approved a decree changing the traditionally used name of Yelysavethrad (or, as referred to in the document, Lysavethrad) to Zinovievsk. This was confirmed by the Presidium of the USSR on 11 September 1924. The name Zinovievsk was chosen to honour Grigory Zinoviev, who was an early Bolshevik leader and Chairman of the Communist International, and was also a native of the city. The name would last for a decade, until it was changed to Kirovo in December 1934. The name Kirovo honoured Sergei Kirov, who was assassinated shortly before the name change. Zinoviev was also accused of complicity in the assassination of Kirov and executed after a show trial during the Great Purge, which is why the name was also changed. In January 1939, with the creation of Kirovohrad Oblast, the name was changed for the final time during this period to Kirovohrad.

During the interwar period, the city was first struck by the 1921–1923 famine in Ukraine. Due to this, a famine-relief committee was founded alongside a branch of the American Relief Administration and the American Jewish Joint Distribution Committee. The Joint operated in the city starting in 1922, giving food shipments primarily to the Jewish population of the city in coordination with the ARA. The organisation also helped with the city's health department, particularly the Jewish hospital. After the city gradually recovered from the famine, it underwent rapid industrialisation as part of the Five-Year Plans. During the Five-Year Plans, most of the industrialisation went into restoring the pre-war enterprises, instead of opening up new ones. Elworthy, which had been renamed to Chervona Zirka (Red Star), remained the city's chief enterprise (it employed nearly 6,000 people), although by the 1930s the garment factory also employed many people (448), as did the button factory and the "Pioneer" coal mine. During this industrialisation, the Kirovska Regional Power Station was put into operation in 1930. These developments, though, did not save it from some of the effects of the Holodomor. In total, 2,238 residents of the city died during it, alongside even more deaths in the surrounding villages that were later absorbed into the city, such as Zavadivka and Lelekivka.

=== World War II ===
Upon the start of Operation Barbarossa, martial law was declared across the whole of the Ukrainian SSR, and mobilisation began among residents in the city. A people's militia was also formed in the city, which had 1,600 people enrolled, alongside a destroyer battalion and a local air-defense detachment that operated starting in June. Many of the important enterprises in the city, such as Chervona Zirka, were not initially evacuated and were instead converted to produce military equipment. After the situation grew more dire following the Battle of Uman, the evacuation of machinery and equipment started to the east. Within the city itself, anti-tank ditches were built, although miscalculations by Soviet command left the city heavily undefended besides these.

==== Battle of Kirovohrad ====
By 4 August 1941, tanks and infantry from the 14th Panzer Division of the Wehrmacht reached the outskirts of the city. At the time, although the city had anti-tank ditches, its defense was weak and scattered, especially after constant attacks in the months preceding the battle. This was made more dire by the fact that over a hundred members of the Soviet Air Force (35th Aviation Base District), had abandoned their posts while on duty the day before the German approach. Seeing this, the 223rd Rifle Division, which had recently seen combat in Uman, was transferred to the city to begin its defense. In addition, a military council member for the Southern Front, S. B. Zadionchenko, and another deputy chief of staff, M. H. Kharytonov, were brought in to help organise the defense. The commission of these two assigned the commander of the 79th Izmail Border Guard Detachment (which had been in the area since July) to become commander of the Kirovohrad garrison although he would not have enough time to defend the city. Fighting for the city lasted only a day after 4 August due to the weak resistance, with the city being taken by German forces on 5 August. The Junkers Ju 87 planes used by the Germans were particularly effective because the city had no air defense. During the Soviet retreat, the main building of Chervona Zirka was deliberately blown up, although the Soviets did not blow up the bridges.

==== Occupation of Kirovohrad ====
German soldiers in Central Square during the occupation.

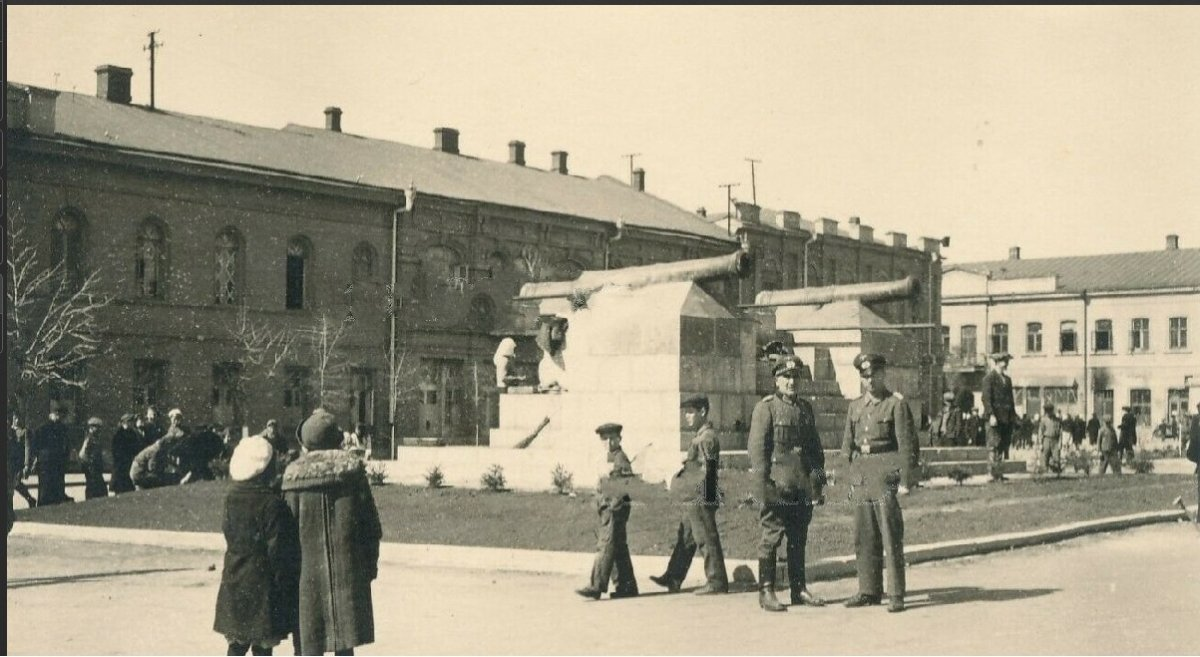
Kirovohrad during occupation (1942).

Upon the creation of Reichskommissariat Ukraine, the city became subordinated to the Nikolajew Generalbezirk, although it remained a district (gebiet) capital as Kirowograd. The city was ruled by the German military commandant, Colonel Podevits, who was the first to issue orders to round up Jews and people who had been part of the civilian battalions that had defended the city. Under Podviets was the "temporary leader" of the city, who was a civilian who reported directly to the commandant. Initially, the "temporary leader" was S.H. Yurko and then Illia Petrenko, and finally, for a long period, a man named Medvedkov. Medvedkov was followed by an officer known as Zyakin until he was arrested and replaced with Sheifele. The city administration under these temporary leaders inventoried households to find property that people had evacuated and resettled them with "new settlers". They also worked on renaming street names, as renaming villages and towns was forbidden, changing in October 1941 Karl Marx Street to Velyka Street, Kirov Street to Mykhailivska Street, and Kirov Square to Velyka Ploshcha, among other changes. Most of these renamings were after Ukrainian cultural figures. Toward the end of 1941, reconstruction efforts resumed for the city's industry, after most of it had been blown up during the Soviet retreat, with a dedicated department also working to restore the trade network in the city, although this proved difficult as many of the markets had been occupied by German units.

Under the occupation, the city's newspapers were replaced with Ukrainian Voice (also Ukrainskyi Holos), which was initially headed by Ivan Mozghovyi and was organised by the city administration. Ukrainian Voice promoted Ukrainian nationalism alongside propaganda pieces about the Nazi administration from pro-German Ukrainians. However, the Germans eventually suspended the paper for some time due to it promoting Ukrainian statehood, and instead reopened it as Ukrainski Visti, which, although still remaining Ukrainophile, did not take on hard-line nationalism. Radio stations were also revived to broadcast in Ukrainian and German, while the drama theatre was reopened, with its repertoire requiring approval by the Gebietskommissariat. The city also experienced a religious revival, although only religious organisations that were "loyal to the German administration" were allowed to operate. The church also served as a tool of propaganda during this period under the bishops.

===== OUN =====
During the occupation, the city had a Ukrainian nationalist underground. In regards to the Organisation of Ukrainian Nationalists, the city had both wings of OUN(m) and OUN(b). The OUN(b) faction was headed by Mozghovyi of the Ukrainian Voice newspaper, which he used to recruit new members. However, it was severely restricted by the Gestapo after 1942, and in 1943, 85 of the Ukrainian nationalist members were executed. Another OUN group was under Mykhailo Dobrovolskyi, an agronomist who initially headed the oblast land administration during the German occupation initially. His house on Hoholya Street served as both a meeting place and safehouse. Dobrovolskyi became sharply anti-German after an OUN figure known as "Dorosh" told Dobrovolskyi that the Germans were not favouring the Ukrainians and that there needed to be an uprising. Dobrovolskyi was later exposed and held by the Germans for two years until he was handed over to the Soviets when the Germans fled, and was sent to ten years in the Correctional labour camps.

===== Partisan underground =====
Plaque to the partisan underground.

In addition to the OUN underground, Kirovohrad had a Soviet partisan underground. Partisan groups were first formed by the Soviets in July 1941, prior to the German arrival. These groups carried out sabotage operations, such as at the military airfield, although the first group, the one formed in July, had most of its members exposed and killed by the Germans by autumn. Due to this, for some time, the underground did not have a central leadership, but many operated independently. One group was under P.I. Lakhman, who helped inform the local population of censored information and also freed prisoners of war on Shevchenko Street. Another group was under O.Z. Buryanova, who also helped aid prisoners of war and distributed leaflets throughout the city while maintaining contact with other detachments. Both groups (Buryanova and Lakhman) were betrayed in November 1943, with members of the groups being shot later that month. Smaller partisan networks, besides these, include the one named after Voroshylov, which was formed in the summer of 1942 under Kostiantyn Honcharov. The organisation, after its formation, recruited Mykhailo Skyrda into its ranks, the only surviving member of the July group that had been exposed earlier. During this time, they freed some 212 prisoners of war, recruited 64 German volunteers, and attacked a German military unit that led to the deaths of dozens of Germans. However, the Voroshylov group faced a similar fate, as after its expansion it was exposed within months, leading to the mass executions of its participants.

===== Holocaust =====
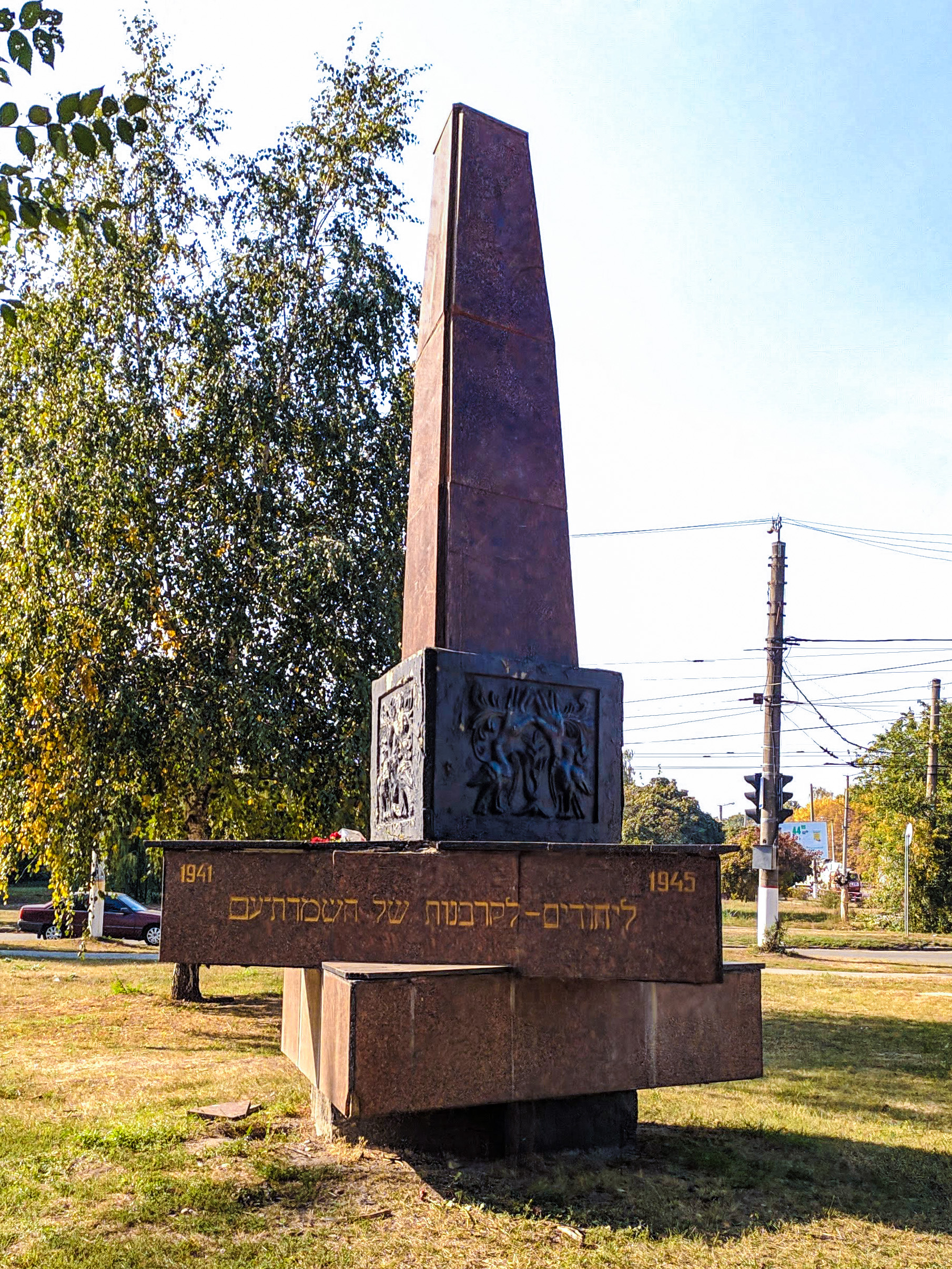
Memorial to victims of the Holocaust.

At the start of the German occupation, the city had a high number of Jews, around 14,641, which made up 15% of the city's population in 1939. After the German occupation started, the Germans ordered the mandatory registration of Jews, although only 4,016 registered. The men were then transported to labour camps in the Kushchivka district, with skilled specialists then being transferred to Polova Street to the prison of the SD for "temporary use". Einsatzkommando 4b also arrived in the city during this time and began the mass execution of Jews on 5 September, the day of Yom Kippur, by shooting 435 Jewish men in the city who had been earlier transported to the SD prison. After a stall, another massacre took place on 30 September 1941, which was the date on which the majority of Jews in the city were killed. An estimated 4,200 Jews were killed that day at an anti-tank ditch that was four kilometres long near the modern-day village of Sokolivske. In total, during all the massacres of Jews in the city, over 5,000 Jews were killed.

==== Liberation of Kirovohrad ====
As early as October 1943, the Soviets began planning an offensive in the direction of Kirovohrad, which was approved in December 1943 and subordinated to the 2nd Ukrainian Front. The Soviets took up positions around Kirovohrad on the night of 4 January 1944, with around 550,000 personnel, 265 tanks, and 500 aircraft. They were opposed by the 8th Army under Otto Wöhler. The following morning, on 5 January at 8:45 a.m., artillery preparations began while sappers cleared the area, after which the tanks rolled in. The 32nd Rifle Corps came from the north, while the 33rd Rifle Corps came from the east together with the 7th Mechanized Corps. By night, the 32nd and 33rd reached the Inhul and had surrounded the city in the northwest. They then entered the city that same day, leading some of the Germans (14th Panzer Division and 376th Infantry Division) to retreat to the village of Lelekivka (now within Kropyvnytskyi) on 6 January. A few Germans, however, remained after the day, leading Colonel Kovtun-Stankevych to request permission to strike at them. After this was granted, fighting continued all day on 7 January within the city, with the railway station eventually being taken by 9:00 p.m. and the city being completely cleared of Germans very late that night. The following day, on 8 January, Joseph Stalin approved the awarding of the honourific title "Kirovohradski" to 23 units.

=== Postwar ===
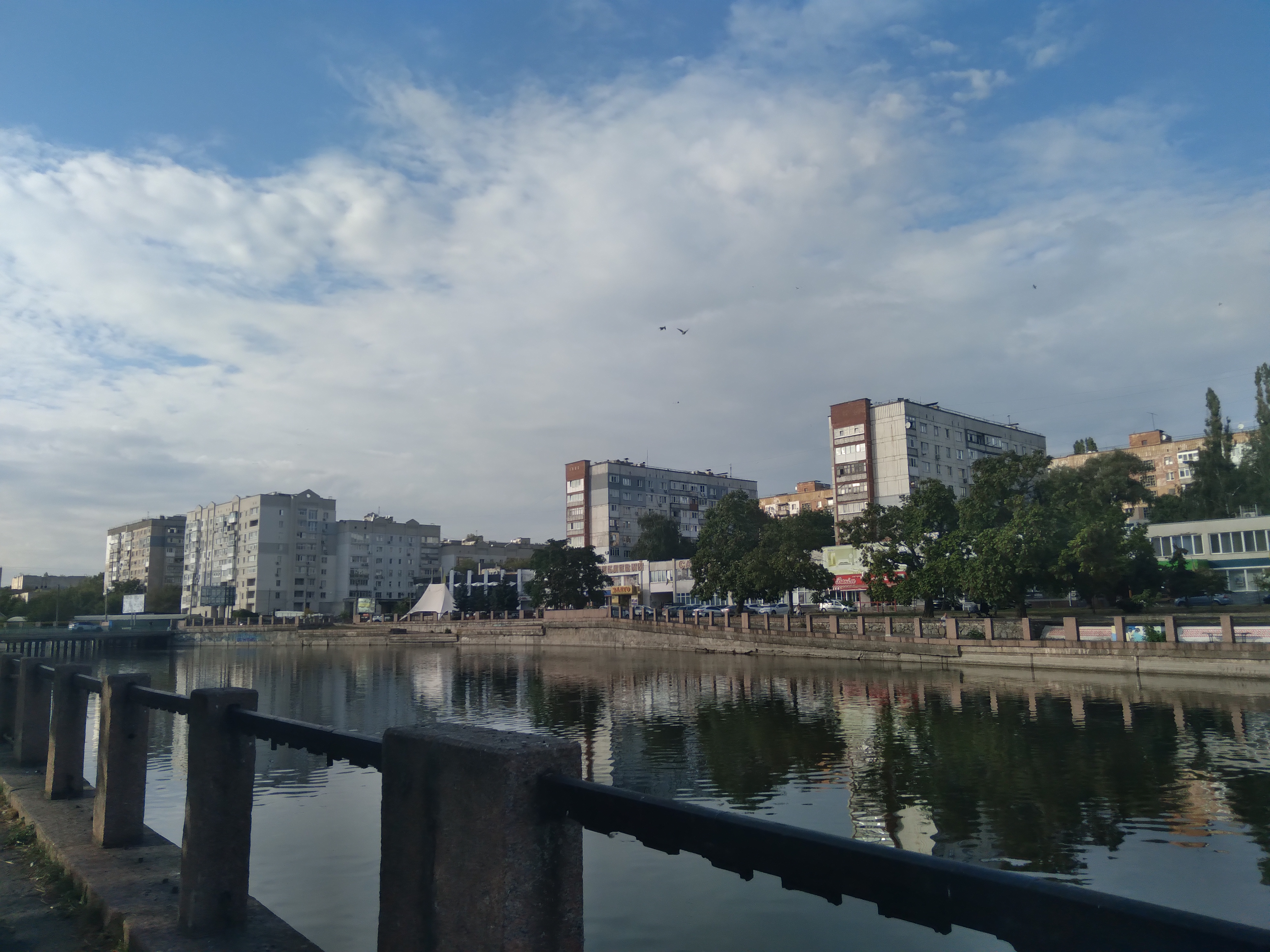
Soviet-era apartment blocks

In the immediate aftermath of the liberation of the city, Kirovohrad was still regularly shelled, and there were still unexploded mines around the city, according to eyewitness accounts. There was also still a food shortage that took multiple years to resolve. Work was done almost immediately, though, on restoring the city, first with the water-supply network and the monument for Sergei Kirov. During the reconstruction, the city was still marked by low-rise buildings with extensive greenery, which had been present before the war. Many new ornamental fountains were added during reconstruction, at least 25, particularly at Lenin Park and at the House of Officers on Shevchenko Street. During this time, a highway was also planned to be built by the USSR going through Kirovohrad en route Chișinău to Poltava. Work first began in 1960, but by the 1970s only the section from Chișinău to the city was completed, leaving the highway largely abandoned.

In the social dimension, the city's educational institutes quickly recovered also, and by 1960-61 had seventeen secondary schools with 8,900 students. There was also a pedagogical institute and a branch of the Dnipropetrovsk Mining Institute that opened in the city in 1967. However, language instruction became increasingly Russified under official Soviet policies. This was apparent in the number of Ukrainian-language schools in comparison to Russian-language ones. In the immediate aftermath of the war, there were 26 Ukrainian-language schools and only 4 Russian-language ones, but by 1987, there were only 7 fully Ukrainian-language schools, 17 Russian-language ones, and 11 that used a mix of both Ukrainian and Russian.

== In an independent Ukraine ==
=== 1990s to early 2010s ===
50th Anniversary Park in 2013.

After the collapse of the Soviet Union, the city of Kirovohrad became part of an independent Ukraine. During the subsequent shift away from the Soviet-era economy, many businesses were privatised, while, specific to the city itself, the informal markets that were widely popular in the 1990s started to transition into supermarkets in the early 2000s. The city also started to shift to marshrutka service during this time. To also move away from the Soviets, in the 2000s, there were multiple attempts to change the city name of Kirovohrad to the pre-Soviet name of Yelysavethrad. A local referendum was planned to be held in October 2008 about renaming the city, which was supported by deputies from the Liberal Party of Ukraine, Our Ukraine, the Party of Regions, and the Yulia Tymoshenko Bloc. Ultimately, the referendum did not happen, although an online poll conducted by the city council the following year found that, of 225 participants, 65% opposed renaming, 32% wanted to restore Yelysavethrad, and 3% said they did not care.

However, the city also became widely known within Ukraine during the early 2000s for its political crises. The first time was in March 2002 during the mayoral election, when the head of the organisation Batkivshchyna in Kirovohrad Oblast, Valerii Kalchenko, was unexpectedly struck from the ballot by the courts. The court ordered this because he had exceeded his campaign-fund limit due to leaflets paid for from his campaign fund that were distributed throughout the city, although Kalchenko's lawyer called the ruling politically motivated. This occurred right after the then-mayor of the city, Oleksandr Nikulin, was held in pre-trial detention on unclear charges, but likely stemmed from his support of Ukraine without Kuchma. Although Kalchenko was ultimately struck off the ballot, the mayoral race had to be conducted twice, leaving the city without a mayor for months all the way to July, with one candidate, Mykola Chyhyryn, occupying the mayoral office even without an official ruling. Chyhyryn's candidacy was supported by people connected to "Artemida", which was headed by the People's Deputy Hanna Antonieva. After Chyhyryn occupied the office, the district court in Odesa ordered a final ruling on the results of the mayoral election, with commission members who had previously invalidated the election being summoned for questioning. This summoning also became disputed because one of the commission members disappeared and later said his signature was forged on a protocol. In the end, after all the drama, Chyhyryn was confirmed as mayor, which he served as until 2006. In the aftermath of the election, large protests were held outside the oblast state administration building, which called for the resignation of the oblast leadership. An open letter signed by leaders of the regional association of Batkivshchyna, Communist Party of Ukraine, Socialist Party of Ukraine, and Sobor accused the then Governor of Kirovohrad Oblast, Vasyl Motsn, of being involved in the "undemocratic" mayoral election and parliamentary election. Further political crises would happen in 2004 during the Ukrainian presidential election of 2004 when the city's electoral district became widely known in Ukraine for electoral fraud, and again in 2006 during the city's mayoral elections, which observers from the European Network of Election Monitoring Organisations (ENEMO) said had irregular voting.

=== Euromaidan ===
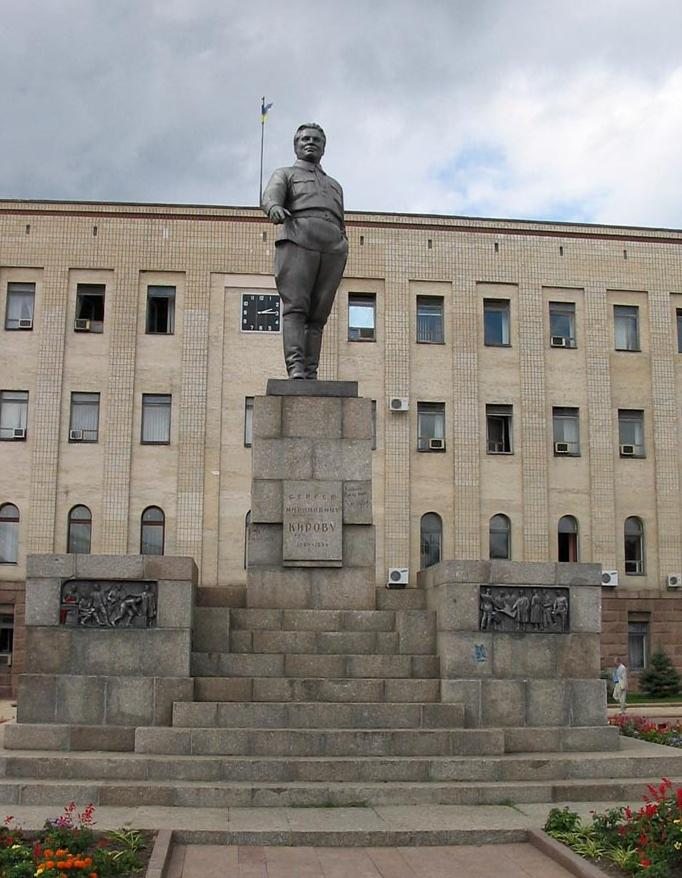
The monument to Sergei Kirov that was removed in February 2014.

Euromaidan protests first began in the city on 24 November 2013, when two students created a group to gather and protest. During the initial protests in November, activists carried European Union flags and collected donations for the central protests in Kyiv. On 27 November, a local administrative court banned the holding of a rally in support of Euromaidan on Kirov Square, while also banning an Anti-Maidan protest that was pushed for. After the dispersal in Kyiv on 30 November, more people came to the protests in the city, and on 1 December, 1,000 to 3,000 residents gathered to protest against the dispersal in Kyiv. A civic association of "Maidan" was eventually formed, and although some courts tried to halt the protests in the city, they were unsuccessful as people continued to protest and many left to join protestors in Kyiv. Another notable occurrence in the city during the initial protests in December 2013 was that the local Berkut unit, which consisted of 220 personnel, was ordered to reinforce the riot police in Kyiv. However, the local unit refused to go to Kyiv, with the unit commanders being removed from their duties and possible sanctions being enforced.

Following the signing of the Anti-protest laws in Ukraine in January 2014, the protests in the city escalated. On 24 January, the oblast council within the city appealed to Viktor Yanukovych and called on him to "hold extremists accountable". At the same time, around 1,000 people gathered in the city, with half being pro-Euromaidan and half being Anti-Maidan supporters. Two days later, 3,000 people gathered in front of the oblast state administration building, calling "for peace, against extremism", which law enforcement viewed as an apparent attempt to seize the building, like what was happening across the country. Tensions further escalated with the news of the death of a native of the city, Viktor Chmilenko, who was killed in Kyiv during the protests. This, along with rumours about titushky being brought to the city, led thousands of people to gather in the main square of the city on 20 February. In response, oblast officials placed personnel and sandbags around the oblast administration building. Three days later, the monument to Sergei Kirov was removed from the city square, while Kirov Square was renamed by the Kirovohrad city council to Heroes of Maidan Square.

=== Recovery ===
View of the Inhul from Kropyvnytskyi, 2020.

In 2015, as part of the decommunisation of Ukraine, Kirovohrad became one of two oblast councils (alongside Dnipropetrovsk) that were subject to being renamed due to the name being related to the Soviets. Seven options were brought forward for consideration during the city's renaming: Inhulsk, Zlatopil, Eksampei, Yelysavehtrad, Kropyvnytskyi, Kozatskyi, and Blahomyr. Later in December, the Verkhovna Rada committee on regional policy recommended the name "Inhulsk", after the Inhul, to replace Kirovohrad. The following month, the city council voted to postpone the renaming, and they also voted against the option of Inhulsk. Then mayor, Andrii Raikovych, said they had postponed due to disagreement on the renaming and that further discussions needed to be held. After months of deliberation, the Verkhovna Rada eventually voted on 14 July 2016, with 230 in favour, to replace Kirovohrad with the name Kropyvnytskyi. Kropyvnytskyi was chosen in honour of writer and playwright Marko Kropyvnytskyi, a native of the city. On 17 July 2020, as part of administrative reforms under Volodymyr Zelenskyy, the Verkhovna Rada passed a law by which Kropyvnytskyi lost its designation as a city of regional significance (the system was abolished nationwide), which meant the city was incorporated into the newly-formed Kropyvnytskyi Raion as its administrative centre alongside also being the administrative centre of the Kropyvnytskyi urban hromada.

=== Russian invasion of Ukraine ===
Aftermath of a Russian drone attack on the men's gymnasium, 2025.

Shortly after the Russian invasion of Ukraine, many Internally displaced persons from the front lines began evacuating to the city. As of 2026, there are nearly 85,000 IDPs in the city, mostly from the Kherson, Donetsk, and Luhansk oblasts. In order to accommodate this, a social dormitory was opened in August 2022 for IDPs, and a former kindergarten in Novyi was also converted to house IDPs. The Kirovohrad Oblast Military Administration also planned to in 2022 convert 2,000 apartments into housing for IDPs, specifically at sites on Henerala Zhadova Street and Universytetskyi Avenue. Local businesses, such as the municipal water utility, also began hiring IDPs. Other infrastructure built because of the war includes a mobile rehabilitation unit for veterans that cost 4 million hryvnias, an outdoor exercise park, and an anti-stress room at the Lyceum of Natural Sciences.

Since the start of the war, like other Ukrainian cities, Kropyvnytskyi has also been the target of frequent air strikes. Shortly after the start, on 14 March, the Russians hit the Kanatovo civil airfield, killing 7 people. The largest attack on the city since the war began was on 19 March 2025, when multiple civilian residential buildings were destroyed, and drones also hit streets such as Myru Street. A later strike on 17 September 2026 hit critical infrastructure in the city, targeting the energy facility.

== Sources ==
- Поліщук, Володимир (2022). Будівничі міста на берегах Інгулу (PDF) (in Ukrainian). Kropyvnytskyi: ВЦ ККТК.
- Пашутин, Александр Николаевич (1897). Исторический очерк г. Елисаветграда. Лито-Типографія Бр. Шполянскихъ.
- Даценко, B. (2014). Велика війна 1941-1945. Кіровоградський вимір. Імекс-ДТД.
- Михайлюк, М. В. (2010). Кіровоградщина і кіровоградці в роки Другої світової війни: Спогади, документи і матеріали. Кіровоградський інститут розвитку людини ВНЗ ВМУРоЛ «Україна».
