= Goykalovo =

Goykalovo Гойкалово
- Khutor
- Location within Voronezh Oblast Location within Russia
- Coordinates: 50°40′N 39°16′E
- Country: Russia
- Region: Voronezh Oblast
- District: Kamensky District
- Time zone: UTC+3:00

Goykalovo (Russian: Гойкалово) is a rural locality (a khutor) in Degtyarenskoye Rural Settlement, Kamensky District, Voronezh Oblast, Russia. The population was 202 as of 2010. There are 4 streets.

== Geography ==
Goykalovo is located 22 km southwest of Kamenka (the district's administrative centre) by road. Sitnikovo is the nearest rural locality.
