= Kirichenkovo =

Kirichenkovo Кириченково
- Selo
- Location within Voronezh Oblast Location within Russia
- Coordinates: 50°41′N 39°23′E
- Country: Russia
- Region: Voronezh Oblast
- District: Kamensky District
- Time zone: UTC+3:00

Kirichenkovo (Russian: Кириченково) is a rural locality (a selo) in Tkhorevskoye Rural Settlement, Kamensky District, Voronezh Oblast, Russia. The population was 218 as of 2010. There are four streets.

== Geography ==
Kirichenkovo is located 5 km. southwest of Kamenka (the district's administrative centre) by road. Kamenka is the nearest rural locality.
