= Kamensky District =

Federal subjects of Russia which have an entity called Kamensky District.

Kamensky District is the name of several administrative and municipal districts in Russia. The name is generally derived from or is related to the root "kamen" ("stone")—a common toponymic feature.

- Kamensky District, Altai Krai, an administrative and municipal district of Altai Krai
- Kamensky District, Penza Oblast, an administrative and municipal district of Penza Oblast
- Kamensky District, Rostov Oblast, an administrative and municipal district of Rostov Oblast
- Kamensky District, Sverdlovsk Oblast, an administrative district of Sverdlovsk Oblast
- Kamensky District, Tula Oblast, an administrative and municipal district of Tula Oblast
- Kamensky District, Voronezh Oblast, an administrative and municipal district of Voronezh Oblast

== See also ==
- Kamensky (disambiguation)
- Kamensky Okrug (disambiguation)
- Kamensk
