= Atamanovka, Kamensky District, Voronezh Oblast =

Atamanovka Атамановка
- Khutor
- Location within Voronezh Oblast Location within Russia
- Coordinates: 50°39′N 39°21′E
- Country: Russia
- Region: Voronezh Oblast
- District: Kamensky District
- Time zone: UTC+3:00

Atamanovka (Russian: Атамановка) is a rural locality (a khutor) in Karpenkovskoye Rural Settlement, Kamensky District, Voronezh Oblast, Russia. The population was 50 as of 2010.

== Geography ==
Atamanovka is located 12 km southwest of Kamenka (the district's administrative centre) by road. Kamenka is the nearest rural locality.
