= Verkhniye Marki =

Verkhniye Marki Верхние Марки
- Selo
- Location within Voronezh Oblast Location within Russia
- Coordinates: 50°46′N 39°36′E
- Country: Russia
- Region: Voronezh Oblast
- District: Kamensky District
- Time zone: UTC+3:00

Verkhniye Marki (Russian: Верхние Марки) is a rural locality (a selo) in Markovskoye Rural Settlement, Kamensky District, Voronezh Oblast, Russia. The population was 383 as of 2010. There are 4 streets.

== Geography ==
Verkhniye Marki is located 18 km northeast of Kamenka (the district's administrative centre) by road. Marki is the nearest rural locality.
