= Lyapino, Voronezh Oblast =

Lyapino Ляпино
- Khutor
- Location within Voronezh Oblast Location within Russia
- Coordinates: 50°46′N 39°22′E
- Country: Russia
- Region: Voronezh Oblast
- District: Kamensky District
- Time zone: UTC+3:00

Lyapino (Russian: Ляпино) is a rural locality (a khutor) in Yevdakovskoye Rural Settlement, Kamensky District, Voronezh Oblast, Russia. The population was 64 as of 2010. There are 2 streets.

== Geography ==
Lyapino is located 8 km north of Kamenka (the district's administrative centre) by road. Yevdakovo is the nearest rural locality.
