= Krutets, Voronezh Oblast =

Krutets Крутец
- Khutor
- Location within Voronezh Oblast Location within Russia
- Coordinates: 50°47′N 39°28′E
- Country: Russia
- Region: Voronezh Oblast
- District: Kamensky District
- Time zone: UTC+3:00

Krutets (Russian: Крутец) is a rural locality (a khutor) in Volchanskoye Rural Settlement, Kamensky District, Voronezh Oblast, Russia. The population was 398 as of 2010. There are 6 streets.

== Geography ==
Krutets is located 30 km north of Kamenka (the district's administrative centre) by road. Rybalchino is the nearest rural locality.
