= Volchansky =

Volchansky (masculine), Volchanskaya (feminine), or Volchanskoye (neuter) may refer to:

- Volchansky Urban Okrug, a municipal formation of Sverdlovsk Oblast, Russia, which the town of Volchansk is incorporated as
- Volchanskoye, a rural locality (a selo) in Voronezh Oblast, Russia
