= Nove, Kirovohrad Oblast =

Rural locality in Kirovohrad Oblast, Ukraine

Nove Нове
- Rural settlement
- Location in Kirovohrad Oblast Location in Ukraine
- Coordinates: 48°31′49″N 32°07′27″E
- Country: Ukraine
- Oblast: Kirovohrad Oblast
- Raion: Kropyvnytskyi Raion
- Hromada: Kropyvnytskyi urban hromada

Population (2022)
  - Total: 8,331
- Time zone: UTC+2 (EET)
  - Summer (DST): UTC+3 (EEST)

Nove (Ukrainian: Нове; Russian: Новое) is a rural settlement in Kropyvnytskyi Raion, Kirovohrad Oblast, Ukraine. It is located in the steppe about 10 kilometres (6.2 mi) west of the center of the city of Kropyvnytskyi. Nove belongs to Kropyvnytskyi urban hromada, one of the hromadas of Ukraine. Population: 8,331 (2022 estimate).

== History ==
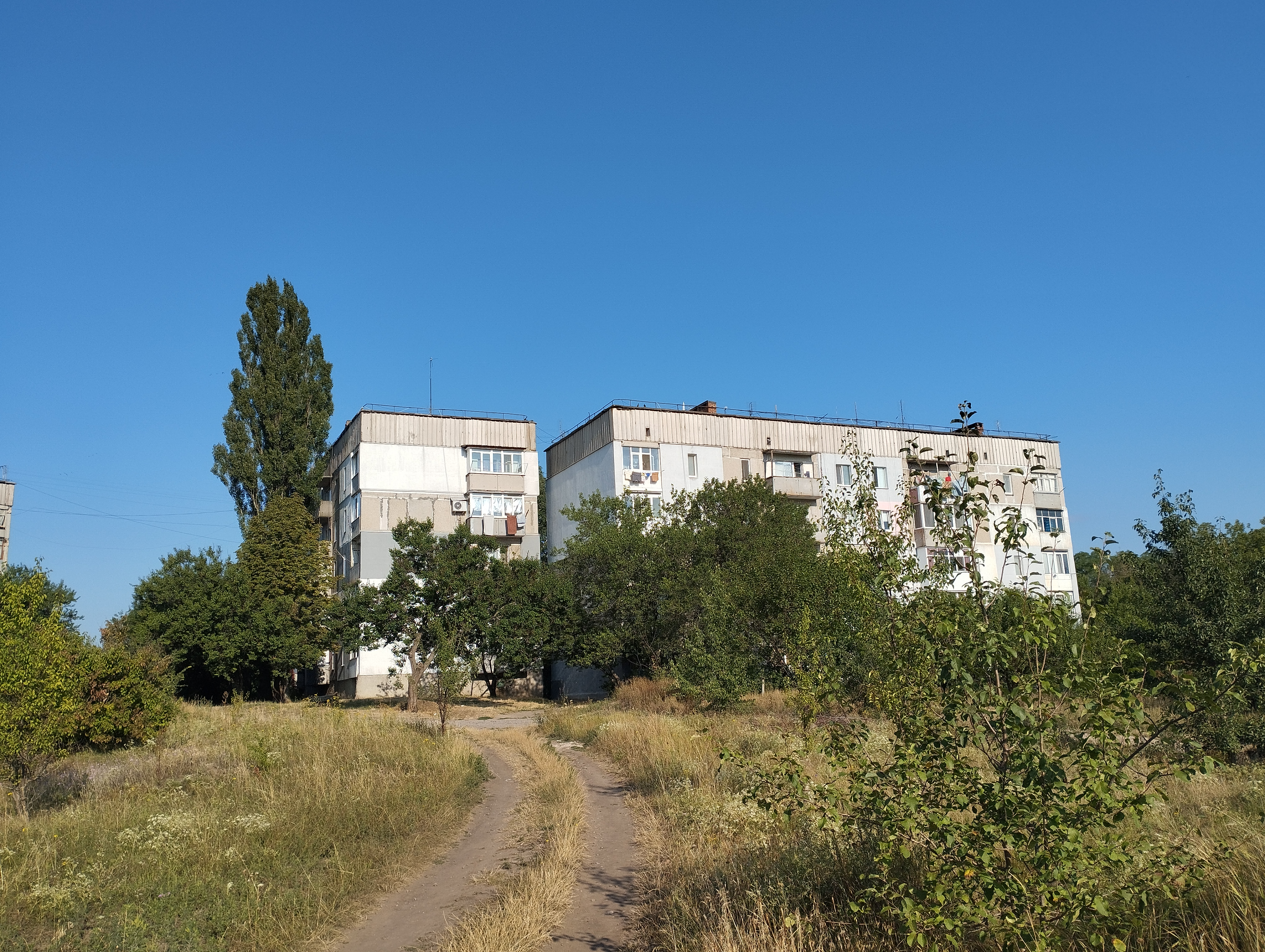
Village buildings

Until 18 July 2020, Nove belonged to Kropyvnytskyi Municipality. However the municipality was abolished as an administrative unit in July 2020 as part of the administrative reform of Ukraine, which reduced the number of raions of Kirovohrad Oblast to four. The area of Kropyvnytskyi Municipality was merged into Kropyvnytskyi Raion.

Until 26 January 2024, Nove was designated urban-type settlement. On this day, a new law entered into force which abolished this status, and Nove became a rural settlement.

== Economy ==
=== Transportation ===
Lelekivka railway station is located in the settlement. It is situated on the railway connecting Kropyvnytskyi and Novoukrainka, with infrequent passenger traffic.

The settlement has access to highways M12 which connects Kropyvnytskyi with Uman and M13 connecting Kropyvnytskyi with the border of the Republic of Moldova, where it continues to Chișinău.
