= Kropyvnytskyi urban hromada =

Urban hromada of Kirovohrad Oblast, Ukraine

Kropyvnytskyi urban hromada Кропивницька міська громада
- Hromada
- Location within Ukraine Kirovohrad Oblast Location within Ukraine
- Coordinates: 48°30′0″N 32°16′0″E
- Country: Ukraine
- Oblast (province): Kirovohrad Oblast
- Raion (district): Kropyvnytskyi Raion

Area
  - Total: 105.0 km^{2} (40.5 sq mi)

Population (2023)
  - Total: 9,704
- Website: kr-rada.gov.ua

Kropyvnytskyi urban territorial hromada (Ukrainian: Кропивницька міська територіальна громада, romanized: Kropyvnytska miska terytorialna hromada) is a hromada in Kropyvnytskyi Raion, Kirovohrad Oblast, Ukraine. Its administrative centre is the city of Kropyvnytskyi.

The hromada has an area of 105.0 km^{2} (40.5 mi^{2}), as well as a population of 9,704 (as of 2023).

== Composition ==
In addition to one city (Kropyvnytskyi), the hromada contains one urban-type settlement, Nove.
