= Kamenskoye Plato =

Kamenskoye Plato Каменское плато
- Village
- Location in Kazakhstan
- Coordinates: 43°30′18″N 77°08′07″E
- Country: Kazakhstan
- Region: Almaty Region
- District: Talgar District

Population (2009)
  - Total: 121
- Time zone: UTC+6 (Omsk Time)

Kamenskoye Plato (Kazakh: Каменксое плато, Kamenskoe Plato) is a village in Almaty Region, in south-eastern Kazakhstan.
