= Kamensky Okrug =

Kamensky Okrug may refer to:

- Kamensky Okrug, Siberian Krai (1925–1930), an administrative division of Siberian Krai, Russian SFSR, Soviet Union
- Kamensky Urban Okrug, a municipal formation of Kamensky District of Sverdlovsk Oblast, Russia
