= Kamensky (inhabited locality) =

Kamensky (Russian: Ка́менский; masculine), Kamenskaya (Ка́менская; feminine), or Kamenskoye (Ка́менское; neuter) is the name of several inhabited localities in Russia:

Urban localities

- Kamensky, Krasnoarmeysky District, Saratov Oblast, a work settlement in Krasnoarmeysky District of Saratov Oblast

Rural localities

- Kamensky, Belgorod Oblast, a khutor in Yakovlevsky District of Belgorod Oblast
- Kamensky, Tatishchevsky District, Saratov Oblast, a settlement in Tatishchevsky District of Saratov Oblast
- Kamensky, name of several other rural localities
- Kamenskaya, Moscow Oblast, a village in Yegoryevsky District of Moscow Oblast
- Kamenskoye, Kamchatka Krai, a selo in Penzhinsky District of Koryak Okrug of Kamchatka Krai
- Kamenskoye, name of several other rural localities

Historical names

- Kamenskaya, name of Kamensk-Shakhtinsky, a town in Rostov Oblast, in 1817–1927
