= Kamensk =

Kamensk (Russian: Ка́менск) is the name of several inhabited localities in Russia.

Urban localities

- Kamensk, Republic of Buryatia, an urban-type settlement in Kabansky District of the Republic of Buryatia

Rural localities

- Kamensk, Bryansk Oblast, a village in Surazhsky District of Bryansk Oblast
- Kamensk, Krasnoyarsk Krai, a village in Yeniseysky District of Krasnoyarsk Krai
- Kamensk, Voronezh Oblast, a settlement in Pavlovsky District of Voronezh Oblast

== See also ==
- Kamensk-Shakhtinsky, a town in Rostov Oblast
- Kamensk-Uralsky, a city in Sverdlovsk Oblast
- Kamensky (inhabited locality) (Kamenskaya, Kamenskoye), name of several inhabited localities in Russia
