= Kamenka, Kamensky District, Voronezh Oblast =

Kamenka Ка́менка
- Urban-type settlement
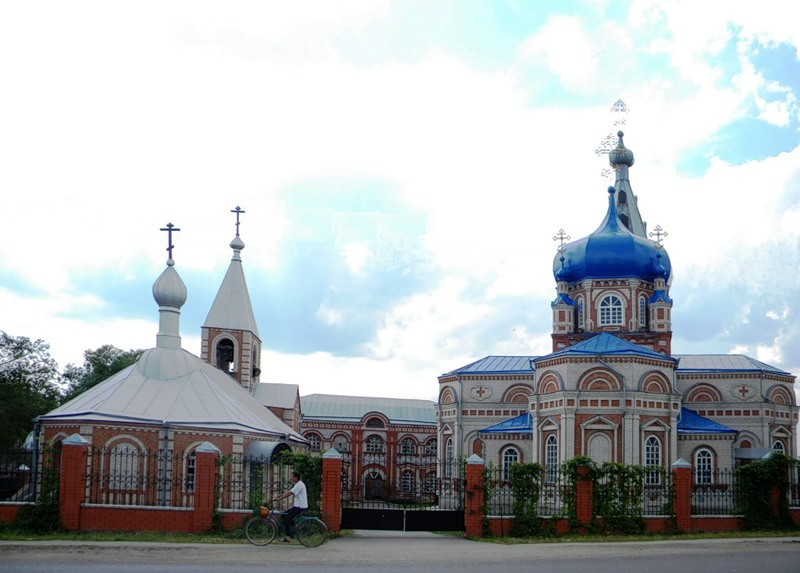

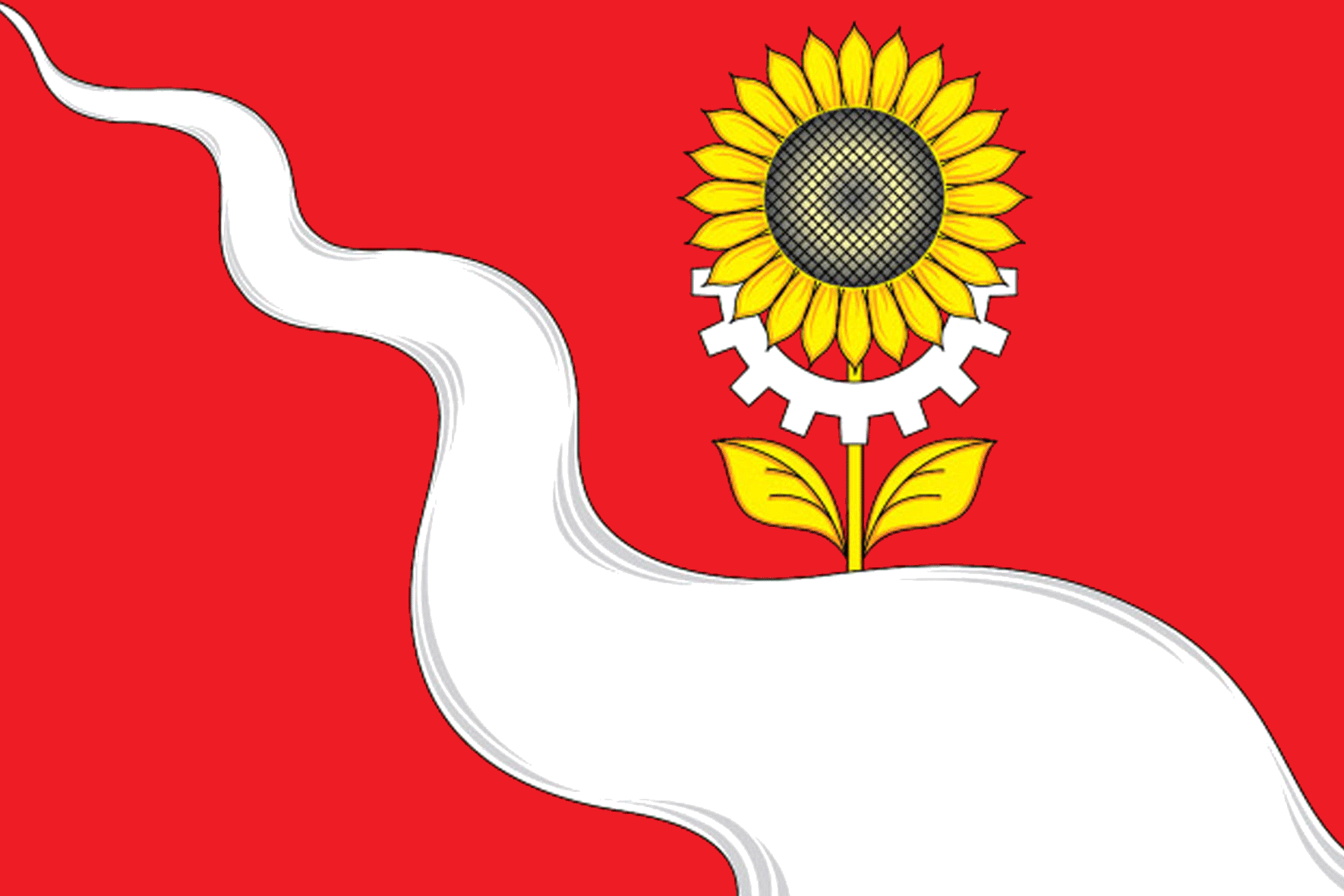
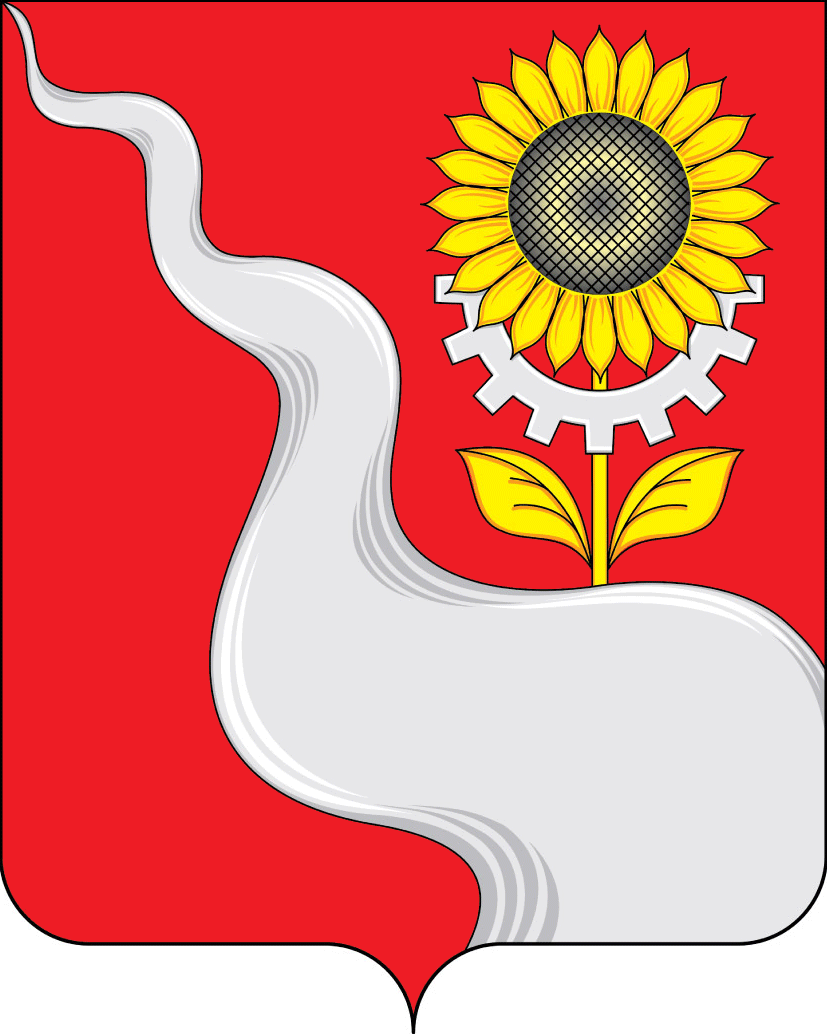
- Flag Coat of arms
- Interactive map of Kamenka
- Location of Kamenka Kamenka (Voronezh Oblast)
- Coordinates: 50°42′N 39°25′E
- Country: Russia
- Federal subject: Voronezh Oblast
- Administrative district: Kamensky District
- Founded: 1750
- Elevation: 226 m (741 ft)

Population (2010 Census)
  - Total: 9,192
  - Estimate (2021): 8,057 (−12.3%)

Administrative status
  - Capital of: Kamensky District
- Time zone: UTC+3 (MSK)
- Postal code: 396510
- OKTMO ID: 20617151051

Kamenka (Russian: Ка́менка) is an urban locality (an urban-type settlement) and the administrative center of Kamensky District of Voronezh Oblast, Russia. Population: 8,057 (2021 census); 9,192 (2010 census); 9,583 (2002 census); 9,478 (1989 Soviet census).

== History ==
It was founded in 1750 as a farm by the Cossacks of the Ostrogozhsky Cossack regiment. A railway station was built in 1871. When the Communists arrived in December 1919 they established the Kamensky Volis Executive Committee. In 1920 hundreds of people died of starvation after the government seized much of the harvest. The status of the urban settlement was obtained in 1937.
