= Kamensky District, Voronezh Oblast =

Kamensky District Каменский район (Russian)
- District
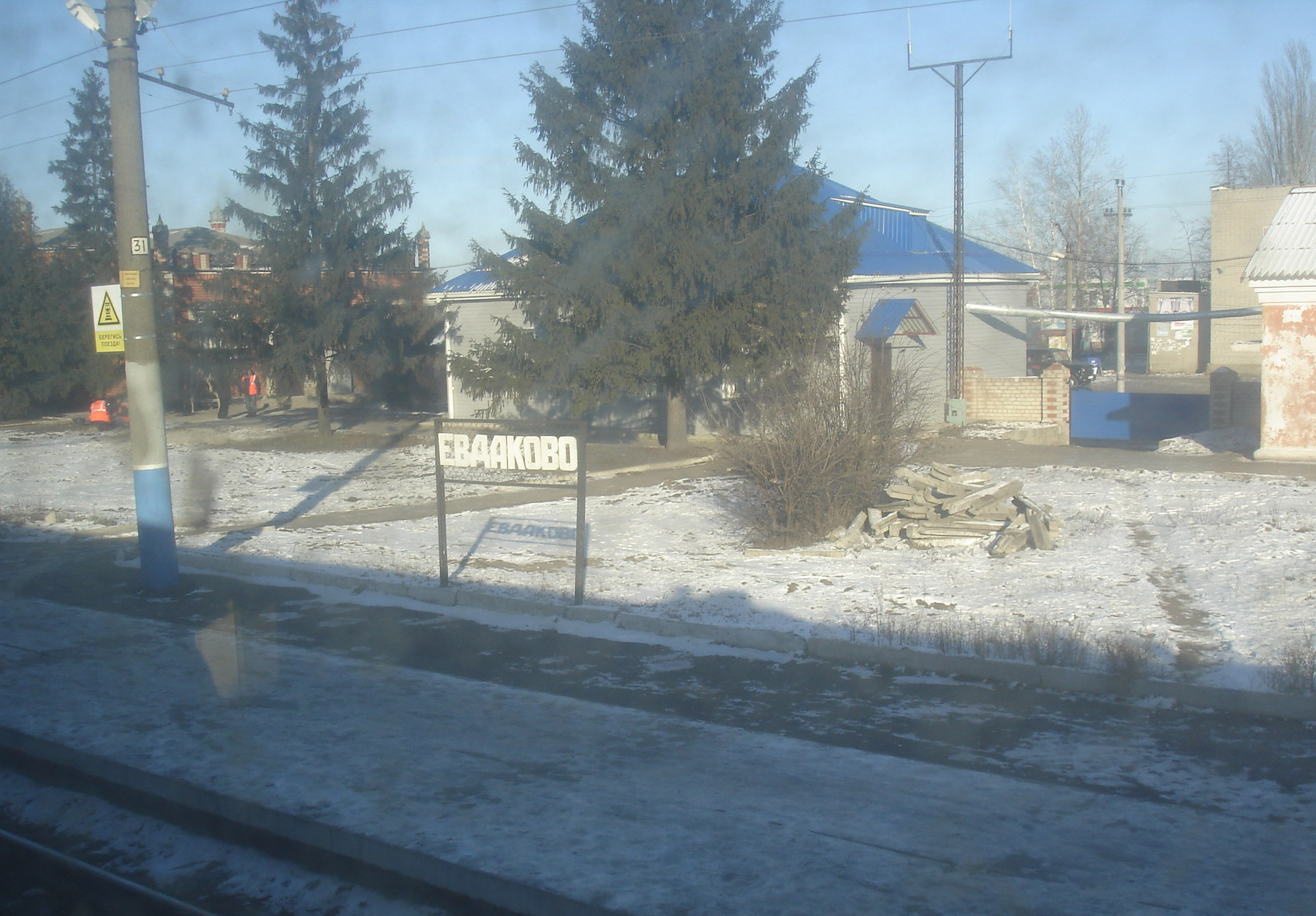
- Train station in Evdakovo, Kamensky District

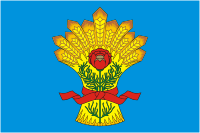
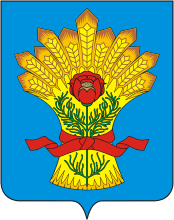
- Flag Coat of arms
- Location of Kamensky District in Voronezh Oblast
- Coordinates: 50°42′N 39°25′E
- Country: Russia
- Federal subject: Voronezh Oblast
- Established: 1928
- Administrative center: Kamenka

Area
  - Total: 999 km^{2} (386 sq mi)

Population (2010 Census)
  - Total: 20,612
  - Density: 20.6/km^{2} (53.4/sq mi)
  - Urban: 44.6%
  - Rural: 55.4%

Administrative structure
  - Administrative divisions: 1 Urban settlements, 10 Rural settlements
  - Inhabited localities: 1 urban-type settlements, 41 rural localities

Municipal structure
  - Municipally incorporated as: Kamensky Municipal District
  - Municipal divisions: 1 urban settlements, 10 rural settlements
- Time zone: UTC+3 (MSK)
- OKTMO ID: 20617000
- Website: http://www.kamenka-vrn.ru/

Kamensky District (Russian: Ка́менский райо́н) is an administrative and municipal district (raion), one of the thirty-two in Voronezh Oblast, Russia. It is located in the west of the oblast. The area of the district is 999 square kilometers (386 sq mi). Its administrative center is the urban locality (an urban-type settlement) of Kamenka. Population: 17,087 (2021 census); 20,612 (2010 census); 21,953 (2002 census); 22,995 (1989 Soviet census). The population of Kamenka accounts for 47.2% of the district's total population.
