= Anna constituency =

Constituency in Voronezh Oblast, Russia

Anna single-member constituency
- Constituency of the Russian State Duma
- Deputy: Sergey Chizhov; United Russia
- Federal subject: Voronezh Oblast
- Districts: Anninsky, Borisoglebsk, Ertilsky, Gribanovsky, Novousmansky, Paninsky, Povorinsky, Ramonsky, Ternovsky, Verkhnekhavsky, Voronezh (Leninsky, Tsentralny, Zheleznodorozhny)
- Voters: 586,818 (2026)

The Anna constituency (No.91 (Note: No.75 in 1993-1995, No.74 1995-2003, No.76 in 2003-2007, No.89 in 2016–2026)) is a Russian legislative constituency in Voronezh Oblast. The constituency covers central and northern Voronezh as well as mostly rural northern Voronezh Oblast.

The constituency has been represented since 2026 by United Russia deputy Sergey Chizhov, six-term State Duma member and businessman, who was redistricted from the eliminated Pravoberezhny constituency and succeeded two-term United Russia incumbent Andrey Markov.

== Boundaries ==
1993–2007: Anna, Anninsky District, Bobrovsky District, Borisoglebsk, Borisoglebsky District, Buturlinovsky District, Ertilsky District, Gribanovsky District, Kashirsky District, Novokhopersky District, Novovoronezh, Paninsky District, Povorino, Povorinsky District, Talovsky District, Ternovsky District
The constituency covered rural central and north-eastern Voronezh Oblast, including the cities of Borisoglebsk, Novovoronezh and Povorino.

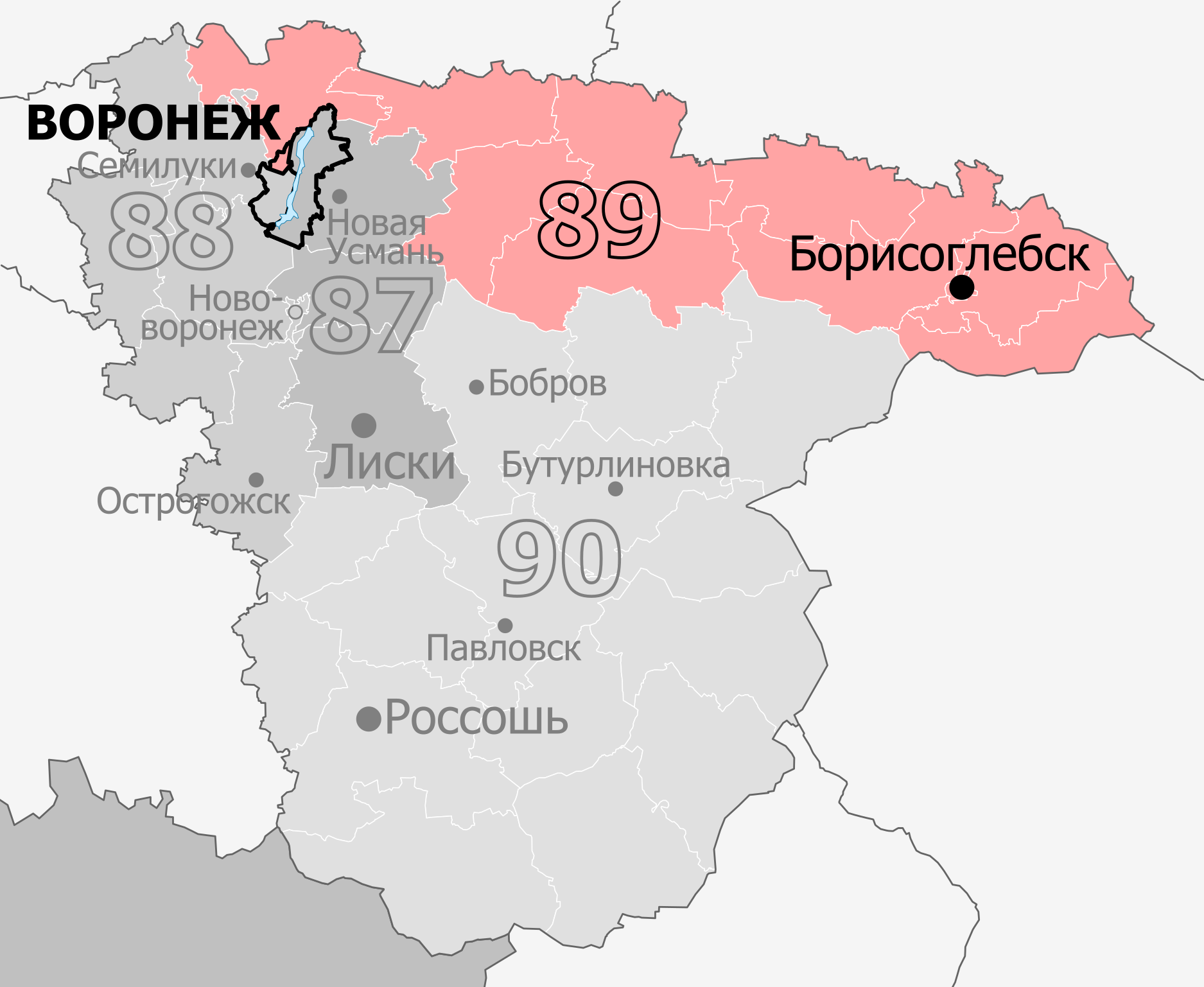
Constituency boundaries from 2016 to 2026

2016–2026: Anninsky District, Borisoglebsk, Ertilsky District, Gribanovsky District, Paninsky District, Povorinsky District, Ramonsky District, Ternovsky District, Verkhnekhavsky District, Voronezh (Kominternovsky)
The constituency was re-created for the 2016 election and retained only its northern half, losing Novovoronezh to Pravoberezhny constituency, Kashirsky District to Voronezh constituency, while Bobrovsky, Buturlinovsky, Novokhopersky and Talovsky were placed into Pavlovsk constituency. This seat instead was pushed to the west, taking Verkhnekhavsky District from Levoberezhny constituency, Ramonsky District and Kominternovsky city district of Voronezh from Pravoberezhny constituency.

2026–present: Anninsky District, Borisoglebsk, Ertilsky District, Gribanovsky District, Novousmansky District, Paninsky District, Povorinsky District, Ramonsky District, Ternovsky District, Verkhnekhavsky District, Voronezh (Leninsky, Tsentralny, Zheleznodorozhny)
After the 2025 redistricting Voronezh Oblast lost one of its four constituencies, so all remaining seats saw major changes. The constituency retained most of its former territory and gained northern half of former Voronezh constituency (Tsentralny and Zheleznodorozhny city districts of Voronezh, Novousmansky District) and Leninsky city district of Voronezh from the dissolved Pravoberezhny constituency. This seat ceded Kominternovsky city district of Voronezh to new Voronezh constituency.

== Members elected ==
By-election are shown in italics.

Election	Member	Party
1993	Nikolay Parinov	Independent
1995	Ivan Rybkin (Note: appointed as Secretary of the Security Council of Russia in October 1996)	Ivan Rybkin Bloc
1997	Dmitry Rogozin	Independent
1999	Dmitry Rogozin	Congress of Russian Communities-Yury Boldyrev Movement
2003	Dmitry Rogozin	Rodina
2007	Proportional representation - no election by constituency	
2011	Proportional representation - no election by constituency	
2016	Aleksey Zhuravlyov	Rodina
2021	Andrey Markov	United Russia
2026	Sergey Chizhov	United Russia

== Election results ==
=== 1993 ===
Summary of the 12 December 1993 Russian legislative election in the Anna constituency
Candidate	Party	Votes	%
Nikolay Parinov	Independent	76,666	25.73%
Ruslan Gostev	Communist Party	35,395	11.88%
Aleksandr Palchikov	Independent	33,510	11.25%
Viktor Golovanov	Independent	21,631	7.26%
Mitrofan Studenikin	Independent	19,201	6.45%
Stanislav Shustov	Independent	16,187	5.43%
Yury Khvorikov	Liberal Democratic Party	13,132	4.41%
Mikhail Chubirko	Kedr	9,859	3.31%
Anatoly Begin	Russian Democratic Reform Movement	9,484	3.18%
Vyacheslav Gulimov	Yavlinsky–Boldyrev–Lukin	6,628	2.22%
against all		33,926	11.39%
Total		297,912	100%

=== 1995 ===
Summary of the 17 December 1995 Russian legislative election in the Anna constituency
Candidate	Party	Votes	%
Ivan Rybkin	Ivan Rybkin Bloc	93,758	28.32%
Aleksandr Polnikov	Agrarian Party	39,460	11.92%
Anatoly Naumov	Independent	34,714	10.48%
Nikolay Parinov (incumbent)	Independent	34,177	10.32%
Aleksandr Sterligov	Union of Patriots	27,804	8.40%
Sergey Kravchenko	Liberal Democratic Party	19,982	6.03%
Grigory Dorofeyev	Power to the People!	10,003	3.02%
Vladimir Peshkov	Independent	9,864	2.98%
Aleksandr Ishkov	Our Home – Russia	8,829	2.67%
Yury Shipilov	Trade Unions and Industrialists – Union of Labour	5,639	1.70%
Nikolay Khizhny	Kedr	3,878	1.17%
Nikolay Sapelkin	Independent	3,328	1.01%
Viktor Liyaskin	Union of Workers of ZhKKh	3,031	0.92%
against all		28,326	8.55%
Total		331,122	100%

=== 1997 ===
Summary of the 23 March 1997 by-election in the Anna constituency
Candidate	Party	Votes	%
Dmitry Rogozin	Independent	74,345	37.85%
Yury Dunayev	Independent	50,197	25.55%
Aleksandr Polnikov	Independent	42,325	21.55%
Vladimir Belomyttsev	Independent	4,128	2.10%
Gennady Maklakov	Independent	2,928	1.49%
Viktor Belesikov	Independent	2,772	1.41%
Vyacheslav Silayev	Independent	1,383	0.70%
against all		12,949	6.59%
Total		196,437	100%
Eligible voters/turnout		472,932	41.54%

=== 1999 ===
Summary of the 19 December 1999 Russian legislative election in the Anna constituency
Candidate	Party	Votes	%
Dmitry Rogozin (incumbent)	Congress of Russian Communities-Yury Boldyrev Movement	96,403	32.52%
Sergey Rudakov	Communist Party	83,028	28.01%
Yury Ofitserov	Independent	37,557	12.67%
Vladimir Aliluyev	Independent	17,124	5.78%
Lyubov Rudikova	Russian Socialist Party	11,054	3.73%
Albert Syomin	Fatherland – All Russia	8,048	2.71%
Yury Kukushkin	Liberal Democratic Party	5,761	1.94%
Valery Churlyayev	Independent	4,247	1.43%
Nikolay Koloskov	Independent	2,859	0.96%
against all		23,993	8.09%
Total		296,463	100%

=== 2003 ===
Summary of the 7 December 2003 Russian legislative election in the Anna constituency
Candidate	Party	Votes	%
Dmitry Rogozin (incumbent)	Rodina	192,401	78.88%
Vladimir Sinitsyn	Communist Party	16,867	6.91%
Yury Matveyev	Great Russia–Eurasian Union	6,402	2.62%
Valery Yevseyev	Liberal Democratic Party	4,991	2.05%
Konstantin Ashifin	Union of Right Forces	2,475	1.01%
Sergey Kazbanov	Independent	1,528	0.63%
Aleksey Safonov	United Russian Party Rus'	1,218	0.50%
against all		14,210	5.83%
Total		244,174	100%

=== 2016 ===
Summary of the 18 September 2016 Russian legislative election in the Anna constituency
Candidate	Party	Votes	%
Aleksey Zhuravlyov	Rodina	105,531	44.95%
Sergey Rudakov	Communist Party	52,142	22.21%
Oleg Burtsev	Liberal Democratic Party	21,053	8.97%
Roman Khartsyzov	A Just Russia	15,345	6.54%
Valentina Bobrova	The Greens	9,941	4.23%
Ilya Gullov	Communists of Russia	7,998	3.41%
Andrey Sviridov	Party of Growth	4,551	1.94%
Vladislav Khodakovsky	People's Freedom Party	4,128	1.76%
Ivan Kamenev	Patriots of Russia	3,545	1.51%
Aleksey Kovtun	Civilian Power	2,802	1.19%
Total		227,036	100%

=== 2021 ===
Summary of the 17-19 September 2021 Russian legislative election in the Anna constituency
Candidate	Party	Votes	%
Andrey Markov	United Russia	104,892	46.82%
Aleksandr Shabunin	Communist Party	32,280	14.41%
Artyom Rymar	A Just Russia — For Truth	18,961	8.46%
Andrey Chekurin	New People	18,175	8.11%
Aleksey Zolototrubov	Communists of Russia	17,591	7.85%
Vyachelsav Vladmirov	Rodina	13,272	5.92%
Aleksandr Ovsyannikov	Liberal Democratic Party	11,099	4.95%
Total		224,050	100%

=== 2026 ===
Summary of the 18-20 September 2026 Russian legislative election in the Anna constituency
Candidate	Party	Votes	%
Sergey Chizhov (incumbent) (Note: redistricted from Pravoberezhny constituency)	United Russia	289,850	69.09%
Aleksandr Shabunin	Communist Party	44,762	10.67%
Andrey Suverin	New People	27,217	6.49%
Dmitry Kovalenko	Liberal Democratic Party	21,158	5.04%
Sergey Gulyayev	A Just Russia	19,159	4.57%
Yelena Rykunova	The Greens	11,212	2.67%
Total		419,524	100%
