= Andrei Markov =

Andrei or Andrey Markov may refer to:

- Andrey Markov (1856–1922), Russian mathematician
- Andrey Markov Jr. (1903 –1979), Soviet mathematician
- Andrey Markov (politician) (born 1972), Russian politician
- Andrei Markov (ice hockey) (born 1978), Russian ice hockey defenceman
- Andrei Markov (footballer) (born 1984), Russian footballer
