= Aleksandr Lapin =

Aleksandr Lapin may refer to:

- Alexander Lapin (photographer) (1945–2012), Russian photographer
- Aleksandr Alekseyevich Lapin (born 1952), Russian writer, columnist and social activist
- Aleksandr Lapin (general) (born 1964), Russian Army general
