= Pravoberezhny constituency =

Pravoberezhny single-member constituency
- Constituency of the Russian State Duma

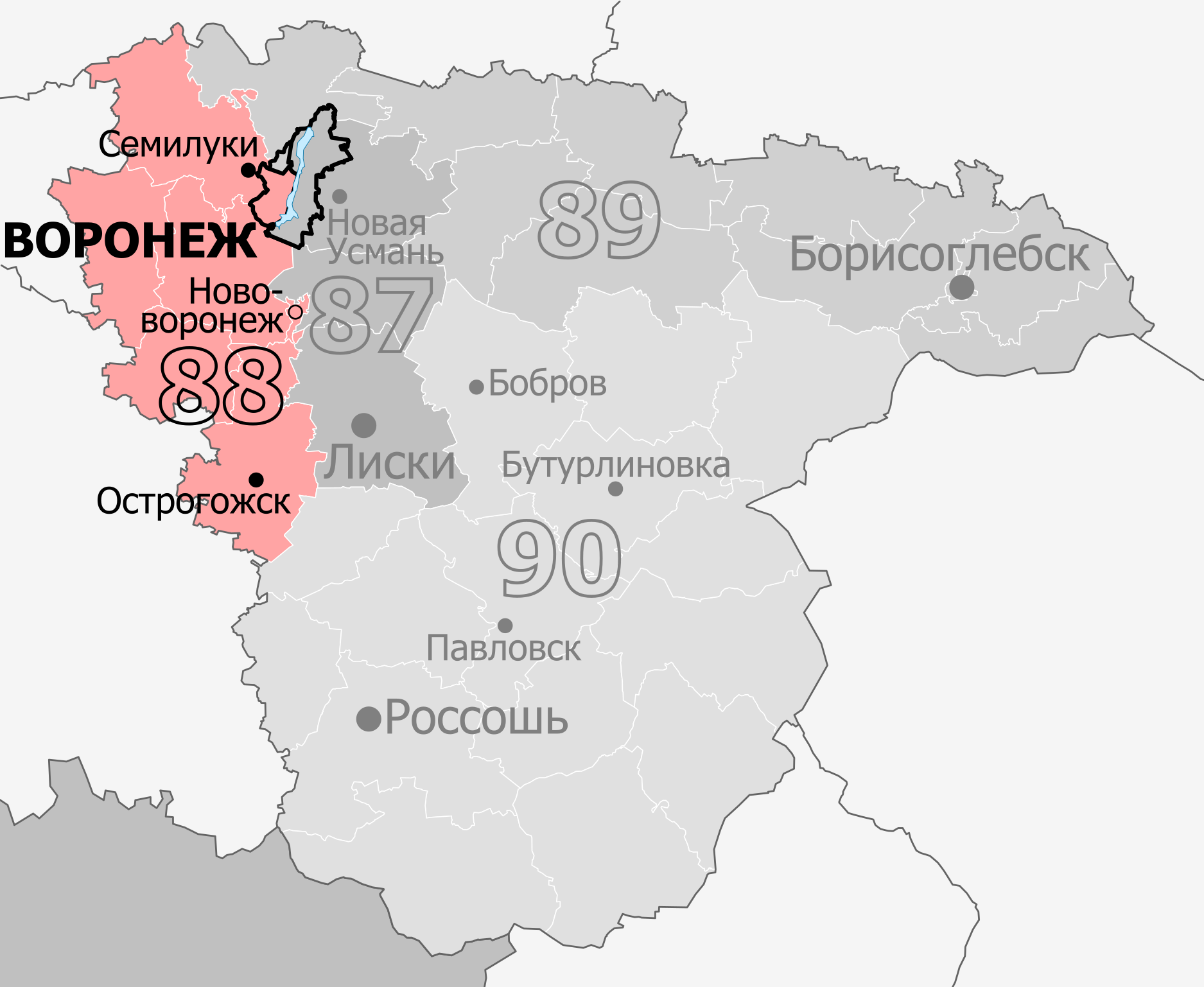
- Constituency boundaries from 2016 to 2026
- Deputy: None
- Federal subject: Voronezh Oblast
- Districts: Khokholsky, Nizhnedevitsky, Novovoronezh, Ostrogozhsky, Repyovsky, Semiluksky, Voronezh (Leninsky, Sovetsky)
- Other territory: Moldova (Chișinău-5)
- Voters: 431,162 (2021)

The Pravoberezhny constituency (No.88 (Note: No.78 in 1993-1995, No.77 1995-2003, Levoberezhny constituency No.79 in 2003-2007)) was a Russian legislative constituency in Voronezh Oblast in 1993–2007 and 2016–2026. The constituency covered parts of Voronezh and Voronezh Oblast on the right bank of the Voronezh River. After 2025 redistricting Voronezh Oblast lost one of its four constituencies, so Pravoberezhny constituency was dissolved and most of it absorbed by Voronezh constituency.

The constituency was last represented by United Russia deputy Sergey Chizhov, a five-term State Duma member and businessman. Chizhov was re-elected to the State Duma in 2026 in the Anna constituency.

== Boundaries ==
1993–2007: Khokholsky District, Nizhnedevitsky District, Ramonsky District, Repyovsky District, Semiluksky District, Voronezh (Kominternovsky, Sovetsky)
The constituency covered western half of Voronezh on the right bank of Voronezh river and north-western corner of Voronezh Oblast.

2016–2026: Khokholsky District, Nizhnedevitsky District, Novovoronezh, Ostrogozhsky District, Repyovsky District, Semiluksky District, Voronezh (Leninsky, Sovetsky)
The constituency was re-created for the 2016 election and retained almost all o its territory, losing Kominternovsky city district of Voronezh and Ramonsky District to Anna constituency. This seat gained Leninsky city district of Voronezh from the former Levoberezhny constituency, atomic city Novovoronezh from Anna constituency and Ostrogozhsky District from Pavlovsk constituency.

== Members elected ==
Election	Member	Party
1993	Igor Muravyov	Civic Union
1995	Vasily Kobylkin	Communist Party
1999	Georgy Kostin	Movement in Support of the Army
2003	Aleksandr Sysoyev	Independent
2007	Proportional representation - no election by constituency	
2011	Proportional representation - no election by constituency	
2016	Sergey Chizhov	United Russia
2021	Sergey Chizhov	United Russia

== Election results ==
=== 1993 ===
==== Declared candidates ====
- Olga Babkina (Kedr), ecological activist
- Pavel Kabanov (BR–NI), advisor to Governor of Voronezh Oblast Aleksandr Kovalyov
- Vladimir Kuznetsov (YaBL), businessman
- Nikolay Morozov (DPR), expert to the Presidential Envoy to Voronezh Oblast
- Igor Muravyov (Civic Union), former People's Deputy of Russia (1990–1993)
- Albert Ognev (Independent), transportation businessman
- Georgy Orlanov (Choice of Russia), Chief Regional Inspector for Freedom of the Press and Media (1993–present), former Member of Voronezh City Council of People's Deputies (1990–1993)
- Dmitry Shamardin (Independent), industrial businessman
- Vladimir Sidelnikov (Independent), agriculture businessman
- Bronislav Tabachnikov (RDDR), Voronezh Oblast Institute for Advanced Training of Education Workers department of history, philosophy, and culture head
- Andrey Yurov (Independent), union organizer

==== Results ====
Summary of the 12 December 1993 Russian legislative election in the Pravoberezhny constituency
Candidate	Party	Votes	%
Igor Muravyov	Civic Union	61,913	24.05%
Olga Babkina	Kedr	–	14.70%
Pavel Kabanov	Future of Russia–New Names	–	–
Vladimir Kuznetsov	Yavlinsky–Boldyrev–Lukin	–	–
Nikolay Morozov	Democratic Party	–	–
Albert Ognev	Independent	–	–
Georgy Orlanov	Choice of Russia	–	–
Dmitry Shamardin	Independent	–	–
Vladimir Sidelnikov	Independent	–	–
Bronislav Tabachnikov	Russian Democratic Reform Movement	–	–
Andrey Yurov	Independent	–	–
Total		257,395	100%

=== 1995 ===
==== Declared candidates ====
- Olga Babkina (Kedr), ecological activist, 1993 candidate for this seat
- Aleksandr Boldyrev (Forward, Russia!), businessman
- Vyacheslav Gulimov (PGL), Voronezh Oblast administration official
- Vasily Kobylkin (CPRF), Member of Voronezh Oblast Duma (1994–present)
- Gennady Kotlyarov (Block of Djuna), corporate executive
- Igor Kozhukhov (Independent), journalist
- Nikolay Malyshev (Independent), air base commander, Hero of the Soviet Union (1987)
- Igor Muravyov (Independent), incumbent Member of State Duma (1994–present)
- Sergey Neprokin (PLP), journalist
- Alla Neretina (NDR), Voronezh State Medical Academy professor
- Yevgeny Novichikhin (APR), writer, journalist
- Ivan Obraztsov (My Fatherland), Chairman of the Voronezh Oblast Committee on Food and Processing Industry (1994–present)
- Georgy Orlanov (Independent), Member of State Duma (1995–present), 1993 candidate for this seat
- Valentin Pavlov (LDPR), journalist
- Dmitry Shamardin (PPR–ST), chairman of the regional chamber of commerce, 1993 candidate for this seat
- Sergey Shaposhnikov (Yabloko), corporate executive
- Nadezhda Sudorgina (K–TR–zSS), journalist

==== Results ====
Summary of the 17 December 1995 Russian legislative election in the Pravoberezhny constituency
Candidate	Party	Votes	%
Vasily Kobylkin	Communist Party	65,198	20.03%
Igor Muravyov (incumbent)	Independent	38,396	11.79%
Valentin Pavlov	Liberal Democratic Party	22,538	6.92%
Alla Neretina	Our Home – Russia	22,528	6.92%
Olga Babkina	Kedr	19,528	6.00%
Aleksandr Boldyrev	Forward, Russia!	18,737	5.76%
Yevgeny Novichikhin	Agrarian Party	16,506	5.07%
Sergey Shaposhnikov	Yabloko	16,299	5.01%
Igor Kozhukhov	Independent	11,516	3.54%
Vyacheslav Gulimov	Pamfilova–Gurov–Lysenko	10,083	3.10%
Nadezhda Sudorgina	Communists and Working Russia - for the Soviet Union	9,858	3.03%
Dmitry Shamardin	Trade Unions and Industrialists – Union of Labour	7,878	2.42%
Nikolay Malyshev	Independent	7,744	2.38%
Ivan Obraztsov	My Fatherland	6,521	2.00%
Gennady Kotlyarov	Block of Djuna	4,833	1.48%
Sergey Neprokin	Beer Lovers Party	2,350	0.72%
Georgy Orlanov	Independent	1,738	0.53%
against all		34,539	10.61%
Total		325,550	100%

=== 1999 ===
==== Declared candidates ====
- Nikolay Averin (OVR), Deputy Governor of Voronezh Oblast (1998–present)
- Boris Belyayev (Independent), law firm director
- Boris Gribanov (Independent), Head of the Federal Border Service Western Regional Office (1994–present)
- Vyacheslav Gulimov (Yabloko), telecommunications lobbyist, 1995 PGL candidate for this seat
- Sergey Khrabskov (RSP), business association director
- Lyudmila Kislova (Independent), pensioner
- Vasily Kobylkin (Independent), incumbent Member of State Duma (1996–present), 1996 gubernatorial candidate
- Georgy Kostin (DPA), Member of State Duma (1996–present), Chairman of the Duma Committee on Conversion and Scientific Technology (1996–present)
- Aleksandr Kosyrev (Independent), Member of Voronezh Oblast Duma (1997–present)
- Sergey Kravchenko (Independent), Member of Voronezh Municipal Council (1997–present)
- Galina Kudryavtseva (KRO-Boldyrev), Member of Voronezh Municipal Council (1997–present)
- Nikolay Kuralesin (Independent), Voronezh State Medical Academy associate professor
- Igor Lykin (DN), businessman
- Yegor Merkulov (Independent), Head of Sovetsky District of Voronezh (1997–present)
- Vasily Panin (RPP), film director
- Andrey Petrochenko (Independent), businessman
- Vera Popova (Independent), trading centre director
- Yury Pozhidayev (Independent), entrepreneur

==== Did not file ====
- Tatyana Asminina (Independent)
- Aleksey Boyev (Independent)
- Andrey Getmanov (Independent)
- Aleksandr Kruk (ROS), machinery plant director
- Larisa Lunina (Independent)
- Valentin Pavlov (LDPR), aide to State Duma member, 1995 candidate for this seat
- Vyacheslav Petrovskikh (Independent)

==== Results ====
Summary of the 19 December 1999 Russian legislative election in the Pravoberezhny constituency
Candidate	Party	Votes	%
Georgy Kostin	Movement in Support of the Army	66,199	21.59%
Vera Popova	Independent	35,354	11.53%
Boris Gribanov	Independent	30,388	9.91%
Nikolay Averin	Fatherland – All Russia	16,374	5.34%
Yegor Merkulov	Independent	14,367	4.69%
Vyacheslav Gulimov	Yabloko	14,172	4.62%
Aleksandr Kosyrev	Independent	13,400	4.37%
Nikolay Kuralesin	Independent	12,748	4.16%
Galina Kudryavtseva	Congress of Russian Communities-Yury Boldyrev Movement	11,177	3.65%
Andrey Petrochenko	Independent	8,987	2.93%
Vasily Kobylkin (incumbent)	Independent	6,622	2.16%
Boris Belyayev	Independent	4,530	1.48%
Lyudmila Kislova	Independent	4,030	1.31%
Vasily Panin	Party of Pensioners	3,878	1.26%
Sergey Khrabskov	Russian Socialist Party	2,942	0.96%
Sergey Kravchenko	Independent	2,360	0.77%
Yury Pozhidayev	Independent	1,815	0.59%
Igor Lykin	Spiritual Heritage	736	0.24%
against all		50,858	16.59%
Total		306,573	100%

=== 2003 ===
==== Declared candidates ====
- Yury Anokhin (Independent), Member of Voronezh Oblast Duma (2001–present)
- Alla Kazmina (LDPR), Judge of the Ertilsky District Court
- Georgy Kostin (CPRF), incumbent Member of State Duma (1996–present)
- Galina Kudryavtseva (Independent), Member of Voronezh City Duma (1997–present), 1999 candidate for this seat
- Nikolay Kuralesin (Independent), Member of Voronezh Oblast Duma (2001–present), 1999 candidate for this seat
- Aleksandr Lapin (Independent), journalist, chief editor of Komsomolskaya Pravda-Voronezh
- Vera Popova (PVR-RPZh), chairwoman of the Russian Party of Life regional office
- Nikolay Suntsov (SPS), businessman
- Aleksandr Sysoyev (Independent), former First Deputy Governor of Voronezh Oblast – Chairman of the Government of Voronezh Oblast (1999–2001)
- Aleksey Yefentyev (APR), agriculture businessman, retired GRU podpolkovnik

==== Withdrawn candidates ====
- Galina Borodavkina (ORP Rus'), pensioner
- Sergey Naumov (Yabloko), aide to State Duma member, entrepreneur

==== Failed to qualify ====
- Aleksandr Karpov (RKDP), businessman

==== Did not file ====
- Nikolay Gusev (Independent), pensioner
- Valery Gusev (KPE), businessman
- Vladimir Ishchenko (Independent), nonprofit president
- Aleksandr Melnik (Independent), businessman
- Anatoly Novikov (Independent), pensioner
- Valentin Vaulin (Independent), security guard

==== Results ====
Summary of the 7 December 2003 Russian legislative election in the Pravoberezhny constituency
Candidate	Party	Votes	%
Aleksandr Sysoyev	Independent	44,664	18.03%
Galina Kudryavtseva	Independent	30,584	12.34%
Georgy Kostin (incumbent)	Communist Party	30,293	12.23%
Aleksandr Lapin	Independent	24,777	10.00%
Nikolay Suntsov	Union of Right Forces	20,073	8.10%
Vera Popova	Party of Russia's Rebirth-Russian Party of Life	19,157	7.73%
Yury Anokhin	Independent	15,688	6.33%
Aleksey Yefentyev	Agrarian Party	14,383	5.80%
Nikolay Kuralesin	Independent	7,294	2.94%
Alla Kazmina	Liberal Democratic Party	5,698	2.30%
against all		30,392	12.27%
Total		248,134	100%

=== 2016 ===
==== Declared candidates ====
- Oksana Averyanova (CPCR), accountant, perennial candidate
- Sergey Chizhov (United Russia), Member of State Duma (2003–present)
- Svetlana Izmaylova (A Just Russia), unemployed
- Sergey Kochetov (Patriots of Russia), Member of Nizhnedevitsky District Council of People's Deputies (2012–present), auditing businessman
- Kirill Osinin (Party of Growth), revisor
- Aleksandr Ovsyannikov (LDPR), Member of Voronezh Oblast Duma (2010–present), construction executive
- Andrey Pomerantsev (CPRF), Member of Voronezh City Duma (2005–present)
- Gennady Ponomarev (Yabloko), IT businessman

==== Did not file ====
- Viktor Kolesnikov (Independent), locksmith

==== Results ====
Summary of the 18 September 2016 Russian legislative election in the Pravoberezhny constituency
Candidate	Party	Votes	%
Sergey Chizhov	United Russia	131,759	58.91%
Andrey Pomerantsev	Communist Party	31,292	13.99%
Svetlana Izmaylova	A Just Russia	15,250	6.86%
Aleksandr Ovsyannikov	Liberal Democratic Party	14,524	6.49%
Oksana Averyanova	Communists of Russia	12,149	5.43%
Gennady Ponomarev	Yabloko	6,002	2.68%
Sergey Kochetov	Patriots of Russia	4,094	1.83%
Kirill Osinin	Party of Growth	3,436	1.54%
Total		223,666	100%

=== 2021 ===
==== Declared candidates ====
- Oksana Averyanova (CPCR), accountant, perennial candidate, 2016 candidate for this seat
- Sergey Chizhov (United Russia), incumbent Member of State Duma (2003–present)
- Anna Gurskaya (New People), community activist
- Denis Kolomentsev (CPRF), agriculture executive
- Aleksey Kudyakov (LDPR), aide to State Duma member Nikita Berezin, perennial candidate
- Denis Larin (The Greens), ecological activist
- Sergey Meleshko (Rodina), corporate executive
- Tatyana Shkred (Yabloko), chairwoman of the party regional office
- Galina Yelfimova (SR–ZP), chemical executive

==== Failed to qualify ====
- Natalia Parfenova (Independent), unemployed
- Lyudmila Rastorguyeva (Independent), community activist, journalist

==== Results ====
Summary of the 17-19 September 2021 Russian legislative election in the Pravoberezhny constituency
Candidate	Party	Votes	%
Sergey Chizhov (incumbent)	United Russia	108,395	53.14%
Denis Kolomentsev	Communist Party	29,897	14.66%
Oksana Averyanova	Communists of Russia	16,019	7.85%
Galina Yelfimova	A Just Russia — For Truth	13,456	6.60%
Anna Gurskaya	New People	11,942	5.85%
Aleksey Kudyakov	Liberal Democratic Party	8,101	3.97%
Sergey Meleshko	Rodina	4,356	2.14%
Denis Larin	The Greens	3,552	1.74%
Tatyana Shkred	Yabloko	2,477	1.21%
Total		203,973	100%
