= Tsar's Wolves =

Russian mercenary company

Tsar’s Wolves
- Царские волки
- Sleeve patch of the Unit
- Active: 2014 – Present
- Country: Russia
- Role: Militia
- Engagements: War in Donbas; Russian invasion of Ukraine: 2023 Ukrainian counteroffensive

Commanders
- Current commander: Dmitry Rogozin

The Tsar's Wolves (Russian: Царские волки, romanized: Tsarskiye volki, also spelled Czar's Wolves) is a Russian militia and mercenary paramilitary group, notable for its ties to former Roscosmos director general Dmitry Rogozin.

== History ==
The group claims to have named themselves after various Russian militias, with no affiliation to one other, that fought in the Yugoslav Wars and the Transnistria War. The group was formed during the War in the Donbas seeing service in the Donetsk Oblast and Luhansk Oblast. The unit has been described as "experienced military advisers and experts" and provide "military-technical support" for the Donetsk People's Republic and Luhansk People's Republic. During the war they operated closely with the 1st Army Corps training them to use smart mortar sights. The group's self stated goal is to restore the glory of the Russian Empire.

=== Rogozin's takeover ===
On 11 November 2022, during the 2022 Russian invasion of Ukraine, Dmitry Rogozin announced that he is the new leader of the group and will be providing "technical assistance" to the Russian Armed Forces. During the war the group has operated a group of unmanned aerial vehicles and other new advanced technologies. Performing field tests for new Russian military advancements and technologies, mostly through trial by fire, with Rogozin being quoted as "What better conditions to test weapons than in a real war." On 21 December, Rogozin was shot and wounded during a three-month stint on the Donetsk front-line. Russian state news agency TASS stated Rogozin was wounded in a strike by a French manufactured CAESAR self-propelled howitzer.

On 27 January 2023, the Tsar's Wolves was working with the Advanced Research Foundation and Android Technika to test the Marker unmanned ground vehicle in a "baptism of fire in the Donbas". Russian forces hope the small unmanned vehicle will be able to act as reconnaissance locating and monitoring Ukrainian positions and movements, and even be outfitted with an explosive payload to destroy western-supplied tanks. On 11 May 2023, Rogozin called for total mobilization of Russian men and materials to wage a total war against Ukraine. Citing mounting combat losses, Rogozin stated that "[Russia] must bear in mind that the enemy is stronger than us" and that his militia "is losing combat-ready guys."

During the 2023 Ukrainian counteroffensive the unit saw combat in the vicinity of Lobkove, where it was unable to stop a Ukrainian advance to take the village.

Rogozin and the Tsar's Wolves have been actively mocked by Yevgeny Prigozhin leader of the fellow mercenary company the Wagner Group. Prigozhin claims that Rogozin is simply putting on a tough-guy persona to regain clout in the Russian government, and to recover from his sacking as head of Roscosmos.

On 9 July 2023, the group reported to have recovered an unexploded Storm Shadow cruise missile, disassembling the missile for transport to Russian facilities for reverse engineering.
