= Pavlovsk constituency =

Russian legislative constituency

Pavlovsk single-member constituency
- Constituency of the Russian State Duma
- Deputy: Aleksey Gordeyev; United Russia
- Federal subject: Voronezh Oblast
- Districts: Bobrovsky, Bogucharsky, Buturlinovsky, Kalacheyevsky, Kantemirovsky, Kashirsky, Liskinsky, Novokhopyorsky, Pavlovsky, Petropavlovsky, Rossoshansky, Talovsky, Verkhnemamonsky, Vorobyovsky, Voronezh (Levoberezhny)
- Voters: 583,900 (2026)

The Pavlovsk constituency (No.92 (Note: No.77 in 1993-1995, No.76 1995-2003, No.78 in 2003-2007, No.90 in 2016–2026)) is a Russian legislative constituency in Voronezh Oblast. The constituency covers southern Voronezh, rural central and southern Voronezh Oblast.

The constituency has been represented since 2021 by United Russia deputy Aleksey Gordeyev, Deputy Chairman of the State Duma, former Deputy Prime Minister of Russia and Governor of Voronezh Oblast, who won the open seam, succeeding one-term United Russia incumbent Andrey Markov after the latter decided to successfully seek re-election in the neighbouring Anna constituency.

== Boundaries ==
1993–2007: Bogucharsky District, Kalacheyevsky District, Kamensky District, Kantemirovsky District, Liski, Liskinsky District, Olkhovatsky District, Ostrogozhsk, Ostrogozhsky District, Pavlovsky District, Petropavlovsky District, Podgorensky District, Rossosh, Rossoshansky District, Verkhnemamonsky District, Vorobyovsky District
The constituency covered rural southern Voronezh Oblast, including the cities of Liski, Ostrogozhsk and Rossosh.

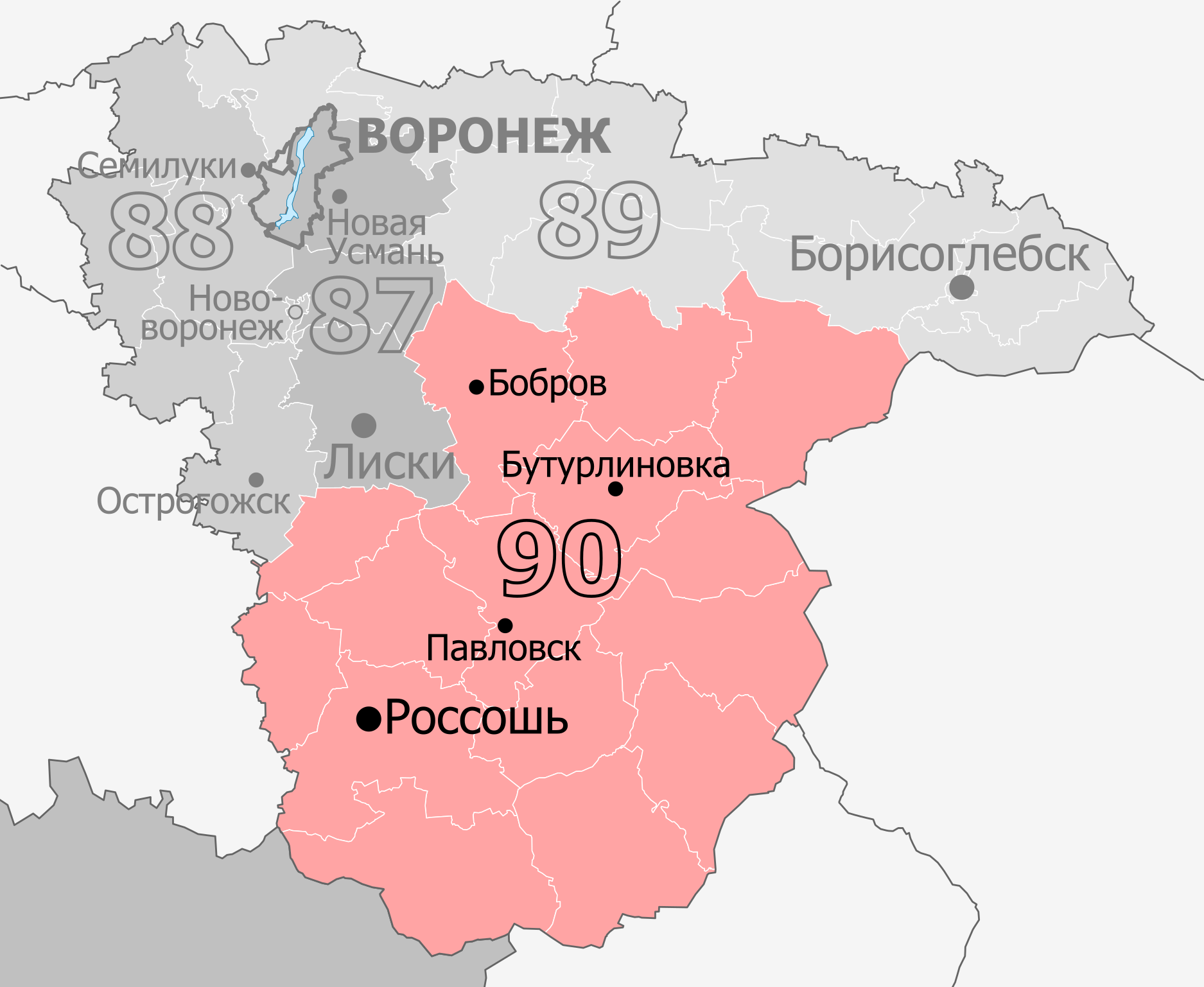
Constituency boundaries from 2016 to 2026

2016–2026: Bobrovsky District, Bogucharsky District, Buturlinovsky District, Kalacheyevsky District, Kamensky District, Kantemirovsky District, Novokhopyorsky District, Olkhovatsky District, Pavlovsky District, Petropavlovsky District, Podgorensky District, Rossoshansky District, Talovsky District, Verkhnemamonsky District, Vorobyovsky District
The constituency was re-created for the 2016 election and retained most of its territory, losing Liskinsky District to Voronezh constituency and Ostrogozhsky District to Pravoberezhny constituency. This seat gained southern half of the former Anna constituency: Bobrovsky, Buturlinovsky, Novokhopersky and Talovsky districts.

2026–present: Bobrovsky District, Bogucharsky District, Buturlinovsky District, Kalacheyevsky District, Kantemirovsky District, Kashirsky District, Liskinsky District, Novokhopyorsky District, Pavlovsky District, Petropavlovsky District, Rossoshansky District, Talovsky District, Verkhnemamonsky District, Vorobyovsky District, Voronezh (Levoberezhny)
After the 2025 redistricting Voronezh Oblast lost one of its four constituencies, so all remaining seats saw major changes. The constituency retained almost all of its territory and gained southern half of former Voronezh constituency (Levoberezhny city district of Voronezh, Kashirsky District and Liskinsky District). This seat ceded Kamensky, Olkhovatsky and Podgorensky districts to new Voronezh constituency.

== Members elected ==
Election	Member	Party
1993	Pyotr Matyashov	Independent
1995	Aleksandr Merkulov (Note: appointed First Deputy Governor of Voronezh Oblast in February 1997)	Communist Party
1997	Yelena Panina	Independent
1999	Nikolay Olshansky	Independent
2003	Nikolay Olshansky	Independent
2007	Proportional representation - no election by constituency	
2011	Proportional representation - no election by constituency	
2016	Andrey Markov	United Russia
2021	Aleksey Gordeyev	United Russia
2026	Aleksey Gordeyev	United Russia

== Election results ==
=== 1993 ===
Summary of the 12 December 1993 Russian legislative election in the Pavlovsk constituency
Candidate	Party	Votes	%
Pyotr Matyashov	Independent	190,852	59.57%
Boris Zhuk	Liberal Democratic Party	38,421	11.99%
Dmitry Plakhotnikov	Russian Democratic Reform Movement	24,825	7.75%
against all		49,234	15.37%
Total		320,403	100%

=== 1995 ===
Summary of the 17 December 1995 Russian legislative election in the Pavlovsk constituency
Candidate	Party	Votes	%
Aleksandr Merkulov	Communist Party	125,841	35.29%
Pyotr Matyashov (incumbent)	Independent	38,781	10.88%
Aleksey Verbitsky	Independent	34,709	9.73%
Yevgeny Mezentsev	Party of Workers' Self-Government	29,844	8.37%
Viktor Glebov	Liberal Democratic Party	28,765	8.07%
Valery Yegorychev	Political Movement of Transport Workers	17,549	4.92%
Nikolay Kuralesin	Ivan Rybkin Bloc	15,037	4.22%
Valery Yakshin	Independent	14,469	4.06%
Vladimir Mandrygin	Power to the People	8,330	2.34%
Anatoly Osadchuk	Independent	4,246	1.19%
against all		31,514	8.84%
Total		356,554	100%

=== 1997 ===
Summary of the 22 June 1997 Russian by-election in the Pavlovsk constituency
Candidate	Party	Votes	%
Yelena Panina	Independent	139,909	68.15%
Mikhail Tsymbalyuk	Independent	28,060	13.67%
Valery Kuznetsov	Independent	16,109	7.84%
Ivan Nezhelsky	Independent	6,072	2.96%
Andrey Kanderov	Independent	3,978	1.94%
Vladimir Belomytsev	Independent	1,450	0.70%
against all		9,695	4.72%
Total		209,023	100%

=== 1999 ===
Summary of the 19 December 1999 Russian legislative election in the Pavlovsk constituency
Candidate	Party	Votes	%
Nikolay Olshansky	Independent	87,738	26.66%
Anatoly Bakulin	Communist Party	74,811	22.73%
Ivan Lachugin	Independent	37,745	11.47%
Aleksandr Lysenko	Independent	35,459	10.77%
Vladimir Frolov	Fatherland – All Russia	17,967	5.46%
Yury Goncharov	Independent	16,287	4.95%
Nikolay Berlev	Independent	9,850	2.99%
Nikolay Bykov	Independent	8,763	2.66%
Yuly Zolotovsky	Independent	6,735	2.05%
Tatyana Vulich	Spiritual Heritage	2,511	0.76%
Vladimir Yefimov	Our Home – Russia	2,265	0.69%
against all		23,226	7.06%
Total		329,103	100%

=== 2003 ===
Summary of the 7 December 2003 Russian legislative election in the Pavlovsk constituency
Candidate	Party	Votes	%
Nikolay Olshansky (incumbent)	Independent	147,614	52.22%
Ruslan Gostev	Communist Party	50,738	17.95%
Vasily Voronin	Rodina	18,440	6.52%
Vitaly Danilov	Liberal Democratic Party	13,820	4.89%
Aleksandr Trufanov	Union of Right Forces	7,259	2.57%
Aleksandr Zolotarev	United Russian Party Rus'	2,781	0.98%
Viktor Melishko	Independent	2,201	0.78%
against all		34,010	12.03%
Total		282,878	100%

=== 2016 ===
Summary of the 18 September 2016 Russian legislative election in the Pavlovsk constituency
Candidate	Party	Votes	%
Andrey Markov	United Russia	198,149	62.69%
Ruslan Gostev	Communist Party	39,142	12.38%
Marina Spitsyna	Liberal Democratic Party	19,148	6.06%
Vitaly Klimov	A Just Russia	17,479	5.53%
Sergey Poymanov	Patriots of Russia	16,153	5.11%
Yury Shcherbakov	Communists of Russia	11,162	3.53%
Marina Lyutikova	Party of Growth	5,283	1.67%
Sergey Mushtenko	Yabloko	2,484	0.79%
Mikhail Ochkin	The Greens	2,187	0.69%
Total		316,073	100%

=== 2021 ===
Summary of the 17-19 September 2021 Russian legislative election in the Pavlovsk constituency
Candidate	Party	Votes	%
Aleksey Gordeyev	United Russia	215,522	72.01%
Denis Roslik	Communist Party	37,378	12.49%
Olga Sofrina	A Just Russia — For Truth	12,429	4.15%
Andrey Stepanenko	New People	9,204	3.08%
Anton Kanevsky	Liberal Democratic Party	8,115	2.71%
Aleksandr Voronov	The Greens	6,497	2.17%
Konstantin Grachev	Rodina	5,424	1.81%
Total		299,274	100%

=== 2026 ===
Summary of the 18-20 September 2026 Russian legislative election in the Pavlovsk constituency
Candidate	Party	Votes	%
Aleksey Gordeyev (incumbent)	United Russia	417,708	84.76%
Denis Roslik	Communist Party	28,874	5.86%
Sergey Gurchenko	New People	13,208	2.69%
Olesya Domnitskaya	Liberal Democratic Party	12,772	2.59%
Roman Khartsyzov	A Just Russia	8,660	1.76%
Konstantin Grachev	Rodina	7,433	1.51%
Total		492,790	100%
