= Voronezh constituency =

Russian legislative constituency

Voronezh single-member constituency
- Constituency of the Russian State Duma
- Deputy: Arkady Ponomaryov; United Russia
- Federal subject: Voronezh Oblast
- Districts: Kamensky, Khokholsky, Nizhnedevitsky, Novovoronezh, Olkhovatsky, Ostrogozhsky, Podgorensky, Repyovsky, Semiluksky, Voronezh (Kominternovsky, Sovetsky)
- Voters: 589,534 (2026)

The Voronezh constituency (No.90 (Note: Levoberezhny constituency No.76 in 1993-1995, Levoberezhny constituency No.75 1995-2003, Levoberezhny constituency No.77 in 2003-2007, No.87 in 2016–2026)) is a Russian legislative constituency in Voronezh Oblast. The constituency covers western Voronezh and parts of Voronezh Oblast on the right bank of Voronezh river.

The constituency has been represented since 2016 by United Russia deputy Arkady Ponomaryov, a four-term State Duma member, dairy farmer and businessman.

== Boundaries ==
1993–2007 Levoberezhny constituency: Novousmansky District, Verkhnekhavsky District, Voronezh (Leninsky, Levoberezhny, Tsentralny, Zheleznodorozhny)
The constituency covered eastern half of Voronezh on the left bank of Voronezh river and its suburbs to the east and north-east.

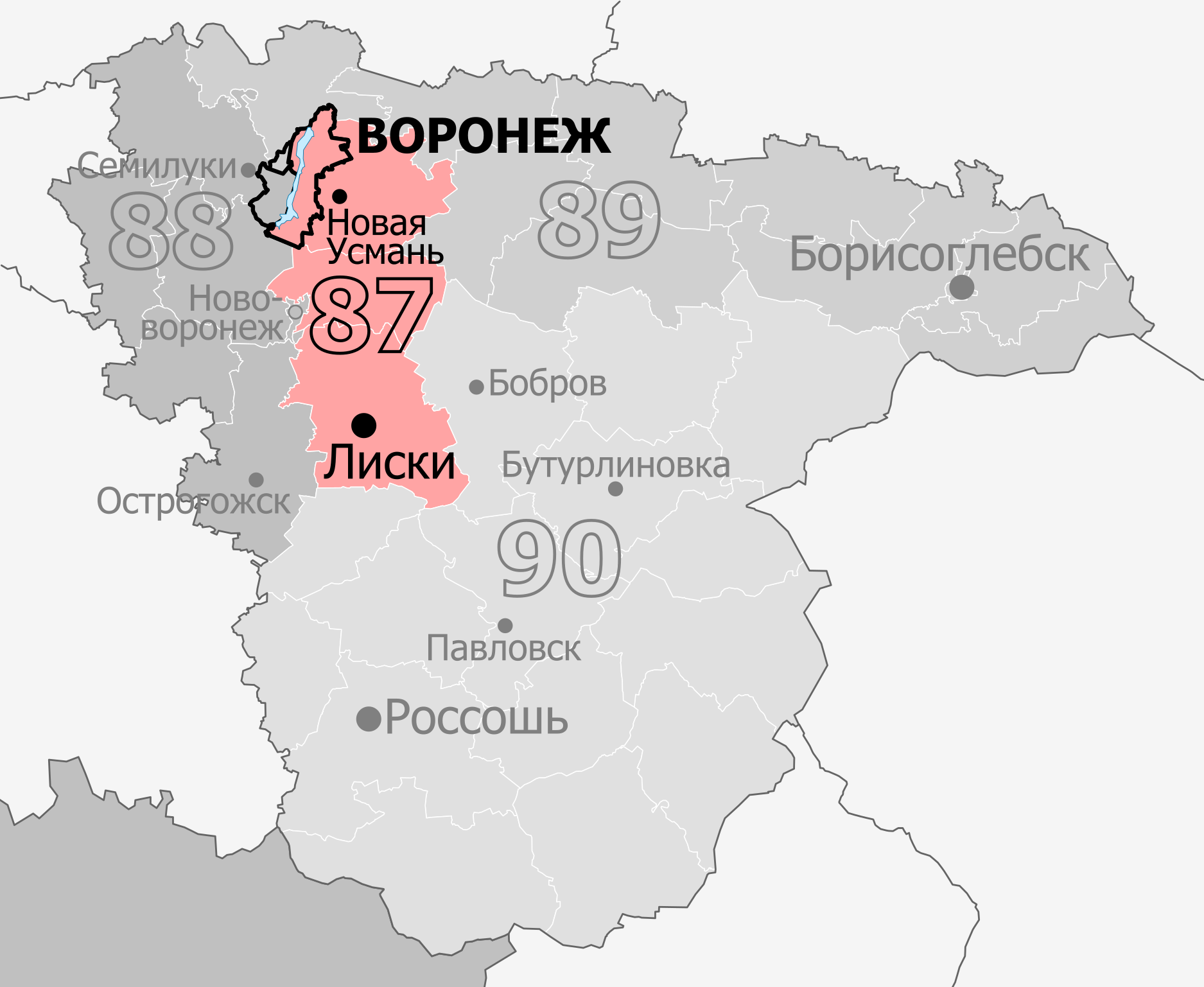
Constituency boundaries from 2016 to 2026

2016–2026: Kashirsky District, Liskinsky District, Novousmansky District, Voronezh (Levoberezhny, Tsentralny, Zheleznodorozhny)
The constituency was re-created for the 2016 election under the name "Voronezh constituency". This seat retained only most of its share of Voronezh and Novousmansky District, losing Leninsky city district of Voronezh to Pravoberezhny constituency and Verkhnekhavsky District – to Anna constituency. The constituency instead was pushed to the south-east, gaining Kashirsky District from Anna constituency and Liskinsky District from Pavlovsk constituency.

2026–present: Kamensky District, Khokholsky District, Nizhnedevitsky District, Novovoronezh, Olkhovatsky District, Ostrogozhsky District, Podgorensky District, Repyovsky District, Semiluksky District, Voronezh (Kominternovsky, Sovetsky)
After the 2025 redistricting Voronezh Oblast lost one of its four constituencies, so all remaining seats saw major changes. The constituency did not retain any of its territory and was reconfigured to western Voronezh Oblast, gaining almost all of the dissolved Pravoberezhny constituency (except Leninsky city district of Voronezh), Kominternovsky city district of Voronezh from Anna constituency, Kamensky, Olkhovatsky and Podgorensky districts from Pavlovsk constituency. Former Voronezh constituency was partitioned between Anna (northern half) and Pavlovsk (southern half) constituencies.

== Members elected ==
Election	Member	Party
1993	Viktor Davydkin	Choice of Russia
1995	Ruslan Gostev	Communist Party
1999	Ruslan Gostev	Communist Party
2003	Sergey Chizhov	United Russia
2007	Proportional representation - no election by constituency	
2011	Proportional representation - no election by constituency	
2016	Arkady Ponomaryov	United Russia
2021	Arkady Ponomaryov	United Russia
2026	Arkady Ponomaryov	United Russia

== Election results ==
=== 1993 ===
Summary of the 12 December 1993 Russian legislative election in the Levoberezhny constituency
Candidate	Party	Votes	%
Viktor Davydkin	Choice of Russia	42,475	16.87%
Viktor Popov	Independent	35,715	14.19%
Yevgeny Novichikhin	Independent	24,745	9.83%
Oleg Berg	Party of Russian Unity and Accord	22,869	9.08%
Dmitry Zhukov	Civic Union	19,287	7.66%
Stanislav Kadmensky	Russian Democratic Reform Movement	16,312	6.48%
Nikolay Avdeyev	Yavlinsky–Boldyrev–Lukin	13,630	5.41%
Dmitry Litvinov	Agrarian Party	7,738	3.07%
Vyacheslav Bityutsky	Independent	7,249	2.88%
against all		40,616	16.13%
Total		251,779	100%

=== 1995 ===
Summary of the 17 December 1995 Russian legislative election in the Levoberezhny constituency
Candidate	Party	Votes	%
Ruslan Gostev	Communist Party	77,723	24.21%
Yevgeny Vorovyev	Independent	33,877	10.55%
Sergey Korolev	Our Home – Russia	28,624	8.92%
Viktor Davydkin (incumbent)	Independent	25,592	7.97%
Vladimir Kuznetsov	Yabloko	24,105	7.51%
Yury Khvorikov	Liberal Democratic Party	17,647	5.50%
Leonid Kuznetsov	Communists and Working Russia - for the Soviet Union	16,979	5.29%
Mikhail Chubirko	Kedr	15,291	4.76%
Vadim Biryuchenko	Independent	8,671	2.70%
Ivan Anchukov	Beer Lovers Party	7,648	2.38%
Boris Skrynnikov	Derzhava	7,602	2.37%
Igor Shilnikov	Independent	5,209	1.62%
against all		42,251	13.16%
Total		321,015	100%

=== 1999 ===
Summary of the 19 December 1999 Russian legislative election in the Levoberezhny constituency
Candidate	Party	Votes	%
Ruslan Gostev (incumbent)	Communist Party	62,042	20.42%
Mikhail Vaytsekhovsky	Independent	49,808	16.39%
Vladimir Chuzhikov	Independent	35,506	11.69%
Sergey Chizhov	Independent	22,380	7.37%
Yury Bezdetko	Yabloko	17,688	5.82%
Boris Skrynnikov	Independent	14,965	4.93%
Nikolay Matveyev	Independent	12,535	4.13%
Vladimir Anishchev	Independent	9,006	2.96%
Vadim Biryuchenko	Independent	4,898	1.61%
Vladimir Kirillov	Independent	3,665	1.21%
Dmitry Buylin	Russian Socialist Party	3,474	1.14%
Vladimir Trishin	Andrey Nikolayev and Svyatoslav Fyodorov Bloc	2,967	0.98%
Vasily Voronin	Russian All-People's Union	2,881	0.95%
Nikolay Pripadchev	Independent	1,748	0.58%
Viktor Ivanov	Independent	1,158	0.38%
Andrey Zavidiya	Our Home – Russia	938	0.31%
Vitaly Novikov	Independent	717	0.24%
against all		51,637	17.00%
Total		303,821	100%

=== 2003 ===
Summary of the 7 December 2003 Russian legislative election in the Levoberezhny constituency
Candidate	Party	Votes	%
Sergey Chizhov	United Russia	90,728	37.24%
Sergey Rudakov	Communist Party	47,954	19.68%
Aleksandr Sysoyev	Independent	23,006	9.44%
Aleksandr Boldyrev	Union of Right Forces	18,058	7.41%
Yulia Bashtovaya	Liberal Democratic Party	8,285	3.40%
Anatoly Korniyenko	Agrarian Party	4,916	2.02%
Vladimir Rubanov	Independent	3,992	1.64%
Leonid Vorobey	Party of Russia's Rebirth-Russian Party of Life	2,752	1.13%
Aleksandr Chernikov	United Russian Party Rus'	2,732	1.12%
against all		36,045	14.79%
Total		243,909	100%

=== 2016 ===
Summary of the 18 September 2016 Russian legislative election in the Voronezh constituency
Candidate	Party	Votes	%
Arkady Ponomaryov	United Russia	118,980	52.15%
Sergey Gavrilov	Communist Party	38,751	16.98%
Galina Kudryavtseva	Communists of Russia	21,961	9.63%
Maksim Filippov	Liberal Democratic Party	17,179	7.53%
Artem Rymar	A Just Russia	11,938	5.23%
Boris Skrynnikov	Patriots of Russia	4,921	2.16%
Konstantin Kornev	Party of Growth	4,774	2.09%
Boris Suprenok	Yabloko	4,047	1.77%
Total		228,154	100%

=== 2021 ===
Summary of the 17-19 September 2021 Russian legislative election in the Voronezh constituency
Candidate	Party	Votes	%
Arkady Ponomaryov (incumbent)	United Russia	116,383	48.83%
Vladimir Kalinin	Communist Party	42,954	18.02%
Lyudmila Yeliseyeva	Communists of Russia	14,750	6.19%
Nikita Berezin	Liberal Democratic Party	13,783	5.78%
Vasily Zhabin	New People	13,750	5.77%
Sergey Lyakhov	A Just Russia — For Truth	10,764	4.52%
Igor Borisov	Rodina	10,539	4.42%
Sergey Shakhov	The Greens	5,981	2.51%
Aleksandr Strelnikov	Yabloko	3,145	1.32%
Total		238,363	100%

=== 2026 ===
Summary of the 18-20 September 2026 Russian legislative election in the Voronezh constituency
Candidate	Party	Votes	%
Arkady Ponomaryov (incumbent)	United Russia	239,773	59.60%
Denis Kolomentsev	Communist Party	52,153	12.96%
Tatyana Andriyevskikh	New People	45,429	11.29%
Oleg Surkov	Liberal Democratic Party	22,929	5.70%
Vadim Sharshov	A Just Russia	15,737	3.91%
Igor Borisov	Rodina	10,997	2.73%
Aleksandr Zhivotov	The Greens	8,050	2.00%
Total		402,296	100%
