= Arkady Ponomaryov =

Russian politician

- Аркадий Пономарёв
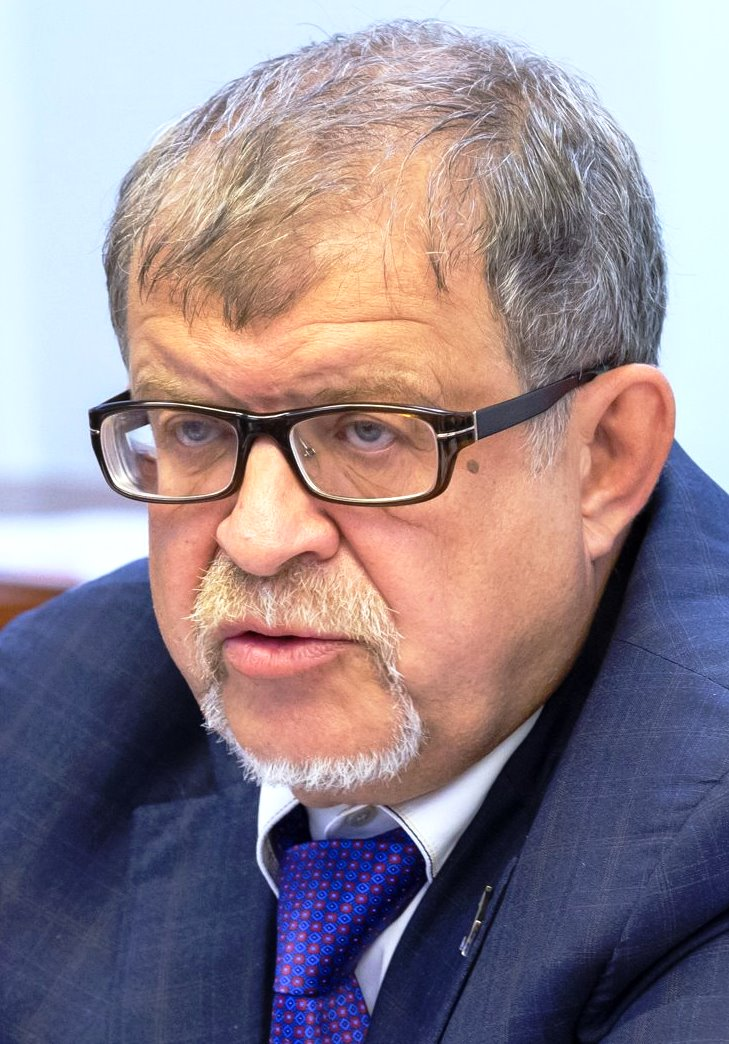

Member of the State Duma for Voronezh Oblast
- Incumbent
- Assumed office 5 October 2016
- Preceded by: constituency re-established
- Constituency: Voronezh (No. 87)

Member of the State Duma (Party List Seat)
- In office 2013 – 5 October 2016

Personal details
- Born: 16 May 1956 (age 70) Voronezh, Voronezh Oblast, Russian SFSR, USSR
- Party: United Russia
- Spouse: Ponomareva Nelya Valerievna
- Children: 4
- Education: Voronezh State University of Engineering Technology

Arkady Nikolaevich Ponomarev (Russian: Аркадий Николаевич Пономарёв; born 16 May 1956, in Voronezh) is a Russian political figure, entrepreneur, and a deputy of the 8th State Duma. In 2009, he was granted a Doctor of Sciences in Technical Sciences degree

After graduating from the university, Ponomarev started working at construction sites in Tver Oblast. From 1984 to 1987, he was the chief engineer of the Rossosh Dairy Plant. He left the position to become the chief engineer and the head of the dairy plant Voronezhsky. In 2005, based on the Voronezhsky dairy plant, Ponomarev founded the company Molvest which manufactures popular dairy products. On 14 March 2010 Ponomarev was elected deputy of the Voronezh Oblast Duma. In 2013, he became deputy of the 6th State Duma. In 2016 and 2021, he was re-elected for the 7th and 8th State Dumas from the Voronezh Oblast constituency.

In 2014, volunteers of the Dissernet accused Ponomarev in plagiarizing his candidate's dissertation.

== Sanctions ==
He was sanctioned by the UK government in 2022 in relation to the Russo-Ukrainian War.
