= Sergey Chizhov =

Russian politician (born 1964)

- Сергей Чижов
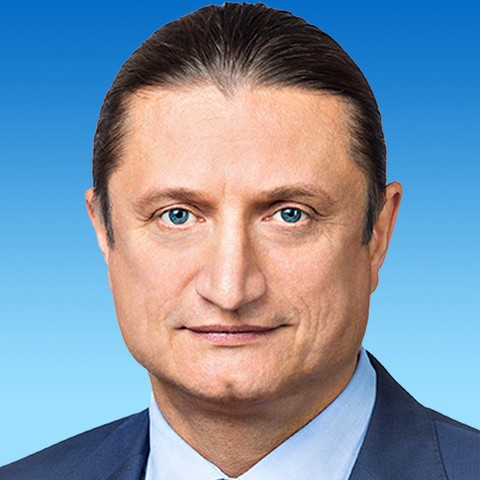
- S.V. Chizhov, State Duma deputy

Member of the State Duma for Voronezh Oblast
- Incumbent
- Assumed office 5 October 2016
- Preceded by: constituency re-established
- Constituency: Pravoberezhny (No. 88)
- In office 29 December 2003 – 24 December 2007
- Preceded by: Ruslan Gostev
- Succeeded by: constituencies abolished
- Constituency: Voronezh (No. 87)

Member of the State Duma (party list seat)
- In office 24 December 2007 – 5 October 2016

Personal details
- Born: 16 March 1964 (age 62) Moscow, RSFSR, USSR
- Party: United Russia
- Spouse: divorced
- Children: 2
- Education: Plekhanov Institute; RANEPA; MFA Diplomatic Academy

Sergey Viktorovich Chizhov (Russian: Сергей Викторович Чижов; born March 16, 1964, Moscow) is a Russian political figure and a deputy of the 4th, 5th, 6th, 7th, and 8th State Dumas.

== Childhood and youth ==
He was born into the family of a military serviceman while his father was studying at the Zhukovsky Air Force Engineering Academy in Moscow. Since 1975, Sergey Viktorovich has lived and worked in Voronezh. In 1979, he graduated from Secondary School No. 19 in Voronezh.

== Education ==
1982 – Vocational Technical School No. 14 in Voronezh

1991 – Moscow Commercial Institute

2003 – Russian Academy of Public Administration under the President of the Russian Federation (Voronezh branch)

2007 – Diplomatic Academy of the Ministry of Foreign Affairs of Russia, Faculty of World Economy

== Political career ==
Chizhov started his political career in 1997 when he first ran in the local elections of the Voronezh City Council. From 2001 to 2003, he was a deputy of the Voronezh Oblast Duma. From 2003 to 2015, Chizhov was a prominent member of the Federal Assembly in the Parliamentary Assembly of the Organization for Security and Co-operation in Europe. Since 2003, he has been constantly re-elected as a deputy for the State Duma of the Russian Federation.

From 2003 to 2019, during his tenure as a deputy of the State Duma of the IV, V, VI, and VII convocations, he was the author or co-author of 271 legislative initiatives and amendments to federal draft laws.

=== Sanctions ===
He was sanctioned by the UK government in 2022 in relation to the Russo-Ukrainian War.

== Public life ==
In 2003, he established a non-profit charitable foundation (Voronezh).

== Awards ==
- 2007 – Medal of the Order "For Merit to the Fatherland" II rate
- 2019 – Gratitude of the Government of the Russian Federation
- 2016 — Medal of the Order "For Merit to the Fatherland," First Class for active legislative activity and many years of conscientious work.
