= Andrey Markov (politician) =

Russian politician

- Андрей Марков
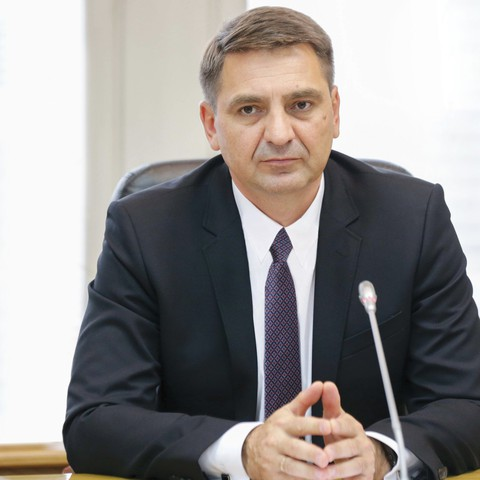
- Markov in 2016

Member of the State Duma for Voronezh Oblast
- Incumbent
- Assumed office 12 October 2021
- Preceded by: Aleksey Zhuravlyov
- Constituency: Anna (No. 89)
- In office 5 October 2016 – 12 October 2021
- Preceded by: constituency re-established
- Succeeded by: Aleksey Gordeyev
- Constituency: Pavlovsk (No. 90)

Personal details
- Born: 30 June 1972 (age 53) Belgorod, RSFSR, USSR
- Party: United Russia
- Education: Voronezh State University; FSB Academy
- Website: deputatmarkov.ru

Andrey Pavlovich Markov (Russian: Андре́й Па́влович Ма́рков; born 30 June 1972 in Belgorod) is a Russian politician. He has represented the Anna constituency for the United Russia party since 2021.

== See also ==
- List of members of the 8th Russian State Duma
