= Dmytro Vorona =

Ukrainian politician (born 1980)

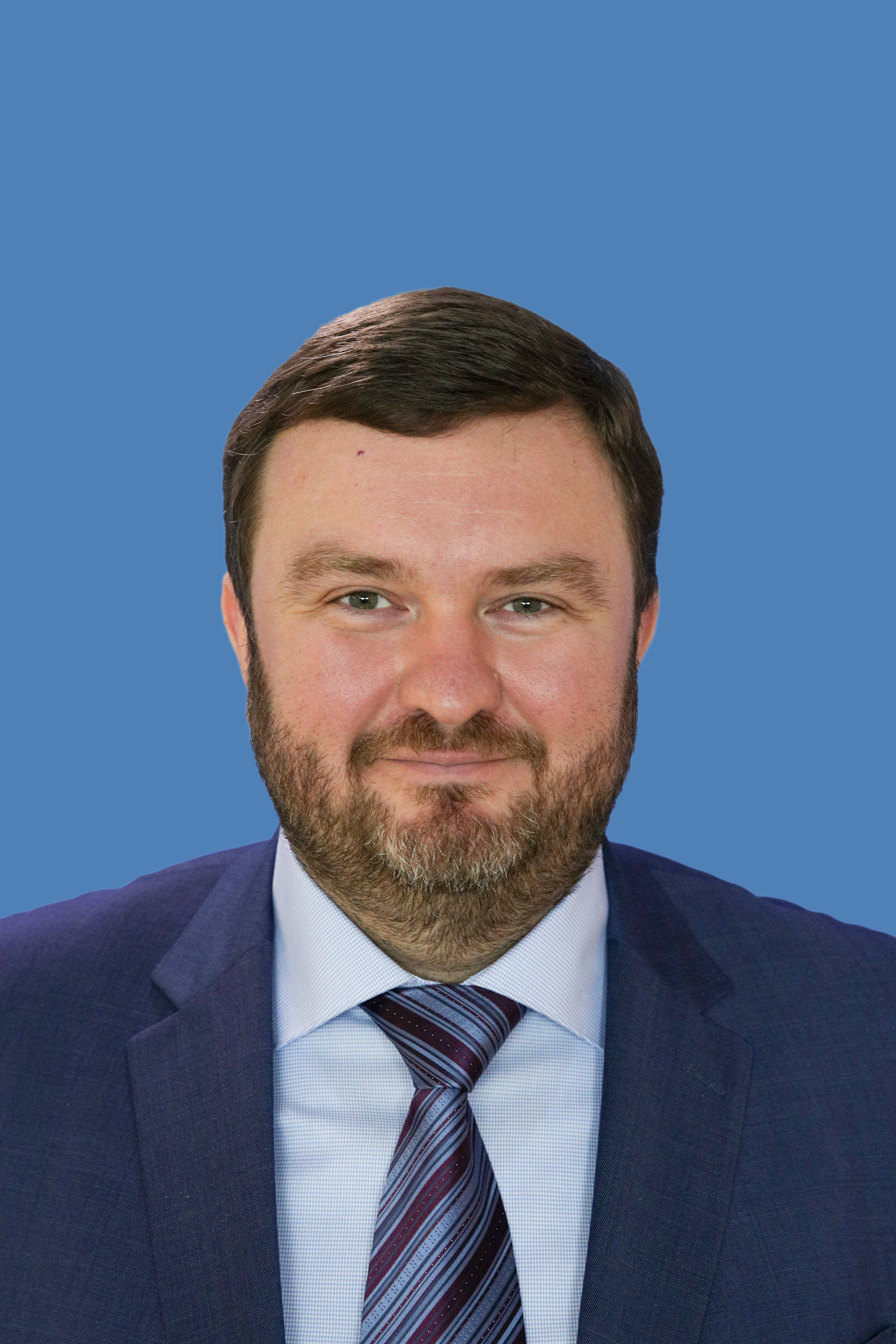
- Official portrait, 2022

Russian Federation Senator from Russian-occupied Zaporizhzhia Oblast on legislative authority
- Incumbent
- Assumed office 20 September 2023

Russian Federation Senator from Russian-occupied Zaporizhzhia Oblast on executive authority
- In office 20 October 2022 – 20 September 2023
- Preceded by: office established
- Succeeded by: Dmitry Rogozin

Chairman of the State Registration Service of Ukraine
- In office 2013–2014

Deputy Minister of Justice of Ukraine
- In office February 2012 – 2013

Deputy Minister of Internal Affairs of Ukraine
- In office March 2010 – February 2012

Personal details
- Born: 24 July 1980 (age 46) Donetsk, Ukrainian SSR, Soviet Union (now disputed)
- Education: Donetsk National University

Dmytro Mykolaiovych Vorona (Ukrainian: Дмитро Миколайович Ворона; born 24 July 1980) is a Russian and former Ukrainian lawyer, civil servant, activist and politician, who serves as a Russian Federation Senator from Russian-occupied Zaporizhzhia Oblast since 2022, on legislative authority as of 2023.

He was the first Senator from the region, which Russia unilaterally annexed from Ukraine after the 2022 invasion.

== Early life ==
Dmytro Vorona was born in 1980 in Donetsk, Ukrainian SSR, Soviet Union.

== Legal career ==
Vorona became a legal advisor in 1996, five years before he was certified by the Donetsk National University as a specialist in law. Throughout his career, he held several roles in the town of Makiyivka, which was then part of newly independent Ukraine. This included serving as Assistant to the Head of the Krasnogvardiyskiy District Court, being a lawyer, working in the Justice Department, running legal companies, and serving as an arbitration administrator.

== Political career ==
In 2006, Vorona was appointed Deputy Minister of Environmental Protection of Ukraine. Remaining a deputy minister, his portfolio was switched to the Ministry of Internal Affairs in March 2010 and to the Ministry of Justice in February 2012.

In 2013, Vorona was appointed Chairman of the State Registration Service of Ukraine. During his work he has worked on a number of legislative projects and progressive steps to reform the system of administrative services and introduce "e- services".

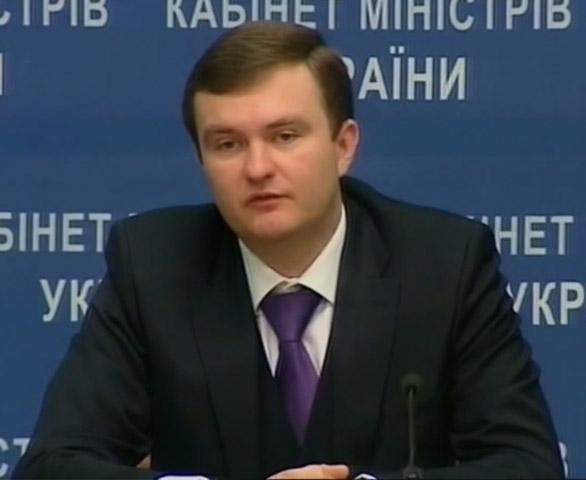
Vorona in February 2014

Vorona earned a doctorate in law the following year.

An ally of Crimean Prime Minister Sergey Aksyonov, Vorona left mainland Ukraine for the peninsula around the start of the conflict in the east Ukraine region in 2014. He became a Russian citizen five years later.

He then established law firms specialising in providing consulting and legal services in the most common areas of law. At the same time, Vorona became involved in legal charities. In 2015 he founded the "Orthodox Heritage of Ukraine on Mount Athos" charity fund, the aim of which is to help restore and preserve the history and memory of the Mount Athos sanctuary. The aim is also for it to become a platform to provide future prospects of working towards identifying and studying material that reveal the history of the monasteries, their relationships with each other and the outside world and the contribution of the Slavic people to the general treasury of Mount Athos and Orthodox society.

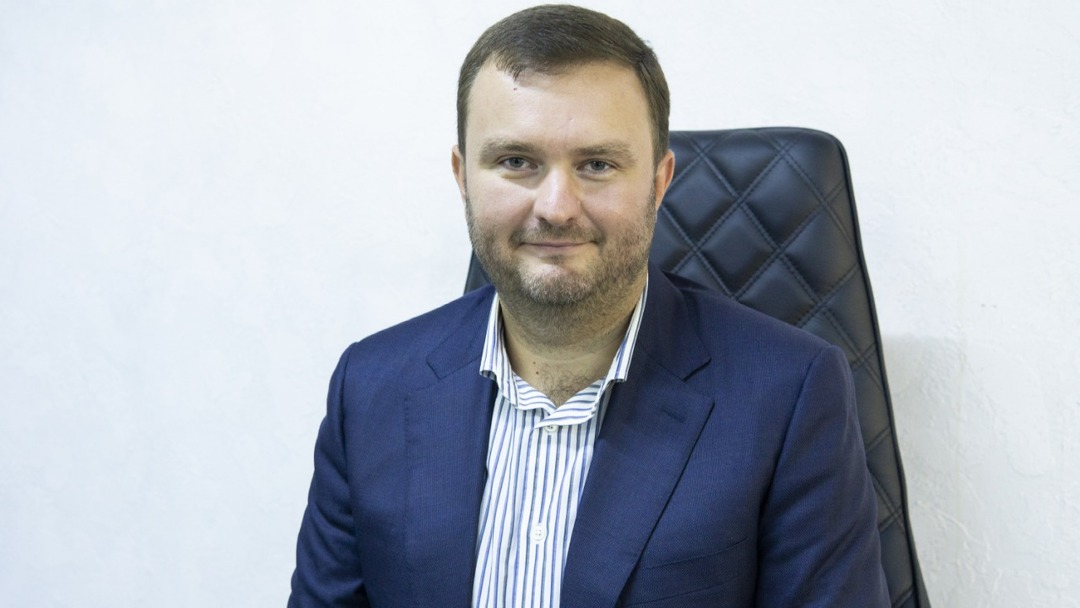
Vorona in 2020

On 20 December 2022, shortly after Russia annexed several east Ukrainian regions amidst its invasion, Vorona was appointed as the representative of Zaporizhzhia Oblast in the Federation Council by Governor Yevgeny Balitsky. He was sanctioned by the European Union for taking up the role. A second representative will be chosen by the new regional legislature after country-wide regional elections in September 2023.

In March 2024, he was convicted and sentenced in absentia to 12 years in prison for treason committed under martial law, aiding the aggressor state, and violating the laws and customs of war. His property in Ukraine was confiscated.

== Honours ==
Order of Merit of the 3rd degree, awarded by the Cabinet of Ministers of Ukraine.
