= Dmitry Rogozin =

Russian politician (born 1963)

- Дмитрий Рогозин
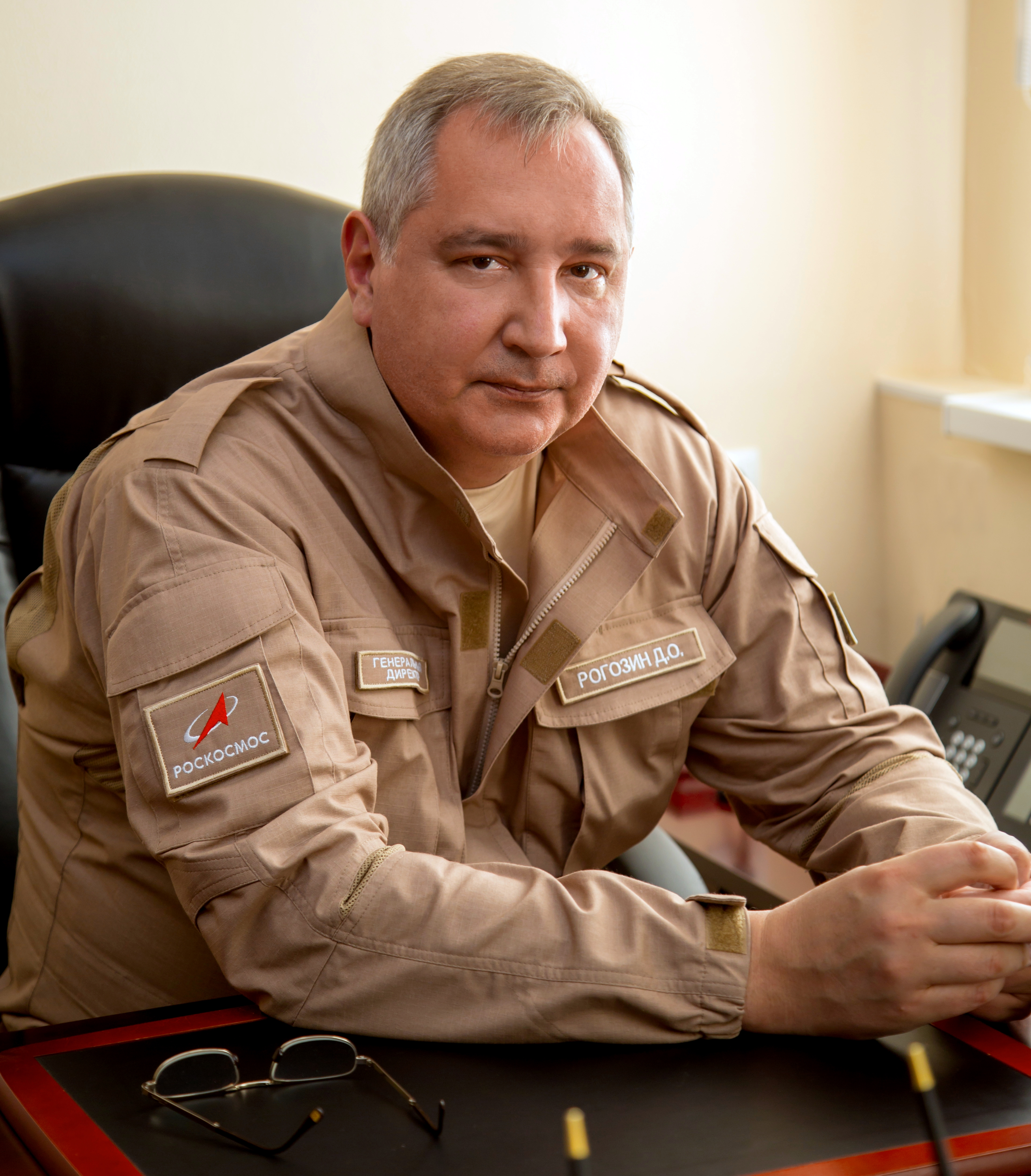
- Rogozin in 2020

Russian Federation Senator from Russia-occupied Zaporizhzhia Oblast
- Incumbent
- Assumed office 23 September 2023
- Preceded by: Dmitry Vorona

General Director of Roscosmos
- In office 24 May 2018 – 15 July 2022
- Preceded by: Igor Komarov
- Succeeded by: Yury Borisov

Deputy Prime Minister of Russia for Defense and Space Industry
- In office 23 December 2011 – 18 May 2018
- Prime Minister: Vladimir Putin; Dmitry Medvedev
- Succeeded by: Yury Borisov

Chairman of the State Duma Committee on International Affairs
- In office 19 January 2000 – 29 December 2003
- Preceded by: Vladimir Lukin
- Succeeded by: Konstantin Kosachyov

Member of the State Duma from Voronezh Oblast's Anna constituency
- In office 1997–2003
- Preceded by: Ivan Rybkin
- Succeeded by: Aleksey Zhuravlyov

Personal details
- Born: Dmitry Olegovich Rogozin; 21 December 1963 (age 62) Moscow, Russian SFSR, Soviet Union
- Party: United Russia
- Other political affiliations: Congress of Russian Communities (1999)
- Spouse: Tatyana Gennadyevna Serebriakova (m. 1983)
- Children: Alexey Rogozin (b. 1983)
- Education: Moscow State University
- Website: www.rogozin.ru

Military service
- Allegiance: Russia; Transnistria
- Years of service: 1992
- Battles/wars: Transnistria War

Dmitry Olegovich Rogozin (Russian: Дми́трий Оле́гович Рого́зин; born 21 December 1963) is a Russian nationalist politician serving as the senator from the Russian-occupied Zaporozhye Oblast since 23 September 2023. He previously served as General Director of Roscosmos from 2018 to July 2022, as deputy prime minister in charge of the defense industry from 2011 to 2018, and as Russia's ambassador to NATO from 2008 to 2011.

He was co-founder of the far-right Rodina political party, which was created in 2003. Parts of the party later merged with other parties to form A Just Russia in 2006.

== Early life and education ==
Rogozin was born in Moscow to the family of a Soviet military scientist. He graduated from Moscow State University in 1986 with a degree in journalism, and in 1988 he graduated from the University of Marxism–Leninism under the Moscow City Committee of the CPSU with a degree in economics.

His thesis on "Philosophy and Theory of Wars" earned him a Doctor of Philosophy while a Doctor of Technical Sciences was awarded to him in the specialty "weapons theory, military-technical policy, weapons systems". Both were earned while he was professionally engaged in politics.

== Political career ==
=== Early career ===
In 1992, Rogozin fought in the Transnistria War against Moldovan forces as a soldier of a volunteer detachment. In Transnistria, he became acquainted with general Alexander Lebed. He is a vocal supporter of Transnistria's independence from Moldova.

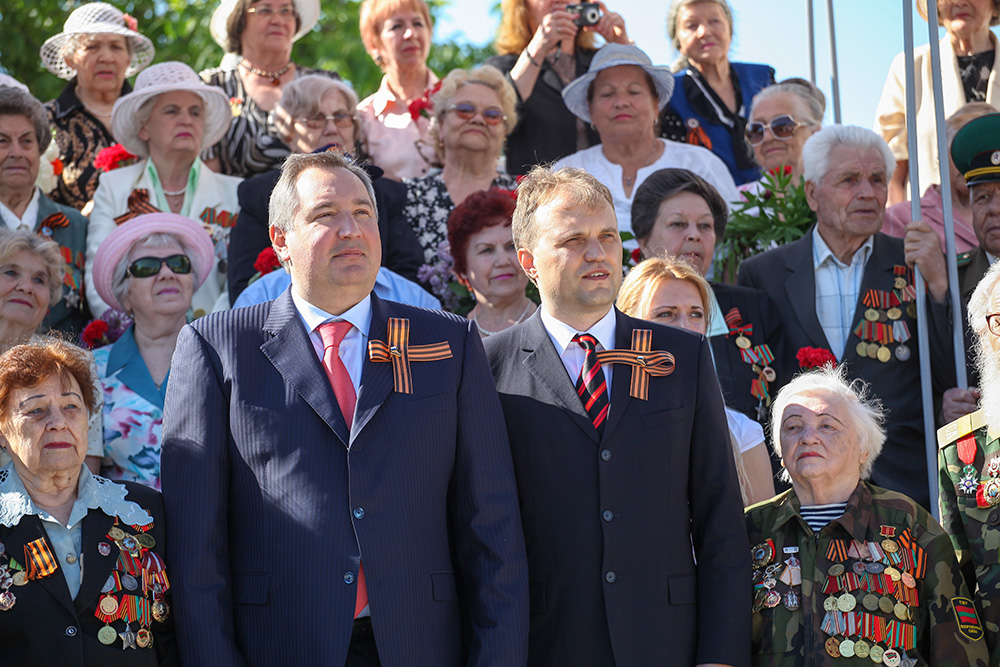
Dmitry Rogozin (left) and the then-president of the Pridnestrovian Moldavian Republic Yevgeny Shevchuk (right) in Tiraspol, in 2013

In 1993, Rogozin joined the Congress of Russian Communities led by General Alexander Lebed and, after its founder died in a 2002 helicopter crash, Rogozin became joint leader with Sergey Glazyev of what became the Rodina party, which was described by Novaya Gazeta journalist Anna Politkovskaya as "created by the Kremlin's spin doctors specifically ... to draw moderately nationalist voters away from the more extreme National Bolsheviks". Rogozin was elected to the State Duma as a deputy from Voronezh Oblast in 1997, and he became a vocal activist for protection of rights of ethnic Russians in countries that gained independence from the Soviet Union.

Rogozin was re-elected to the State Duma in 1999 and then appointed the chairman of the Foreign Affairs Committee, drawing a lot of media attention and a share of criticism for some of his flamboyant public remarks. In 2002, he was appointed a Special Representative of the Russian president to deal with Kaliningrad problems that arose by the Baltic states joining the European Union. Rogozin received an official letter of gratitude from Russian president Vladimir Putin.

In 2003, Rogozin became one of the leaders of the Rodina (Motherland) "national-patriotic" coalition, which won 9.2% of the popular vote or 37 of the 450 seats in the Duma in the 2003 parliamentary election, briefly propelling him to the post of the Duma's vice-speaker, from which he was dismissed a year and a half later as a result of some elaborate interfaction dealings. He remained an ordinary member of the Duma until the following election, in 2007.

After the breakthrough in the 2003 elections, Rogozin became involved in a power struggle with Rodina's other co-chairman, Glazyev, who had socialist views. Glazyev nominated himself as the party's candidate in the 2004 presidential election, but Rogozin called on his party comrades to support incumbent Putin. Rogozin soon ousted Glazyev, to become the party's sole leader.

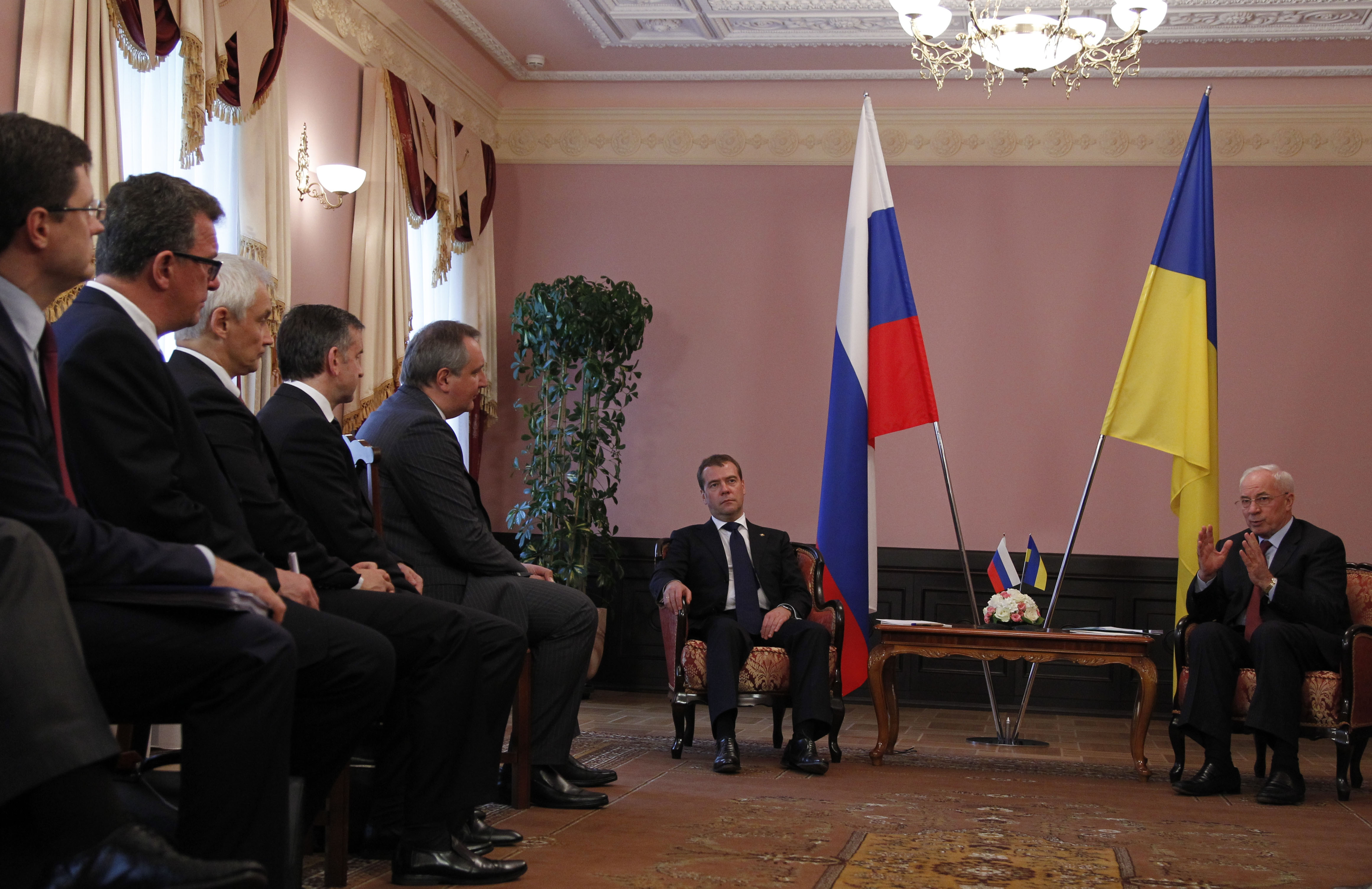
Rogozin, Russian PM Dmitry Medvedev and Ukrainian PM Mykola Azarov, 27 June 2012

Under Rogozin, Rodina shifted towards the right wing of Russian politics and became the second largest and one of the country's most successful parties. A number of controversies on Rogozin's policies culminated in it being banned in 2005 from standing for the 2005 Moscow City Duma election, for using the chauvinist slogan "Let's Clean the Garbage!" Many analysts believe it was made illegally to prevent Rogozin becoming a candidate at the Russian presidential elections in 2008.

Rogozin's right-wing views were not shared by all of his party's members. In early 2006, at Rodina's congress, Rogozin resigned as party leader. Rogozin left Rodina after its merger with the Russian Party of Life and the Pensioners' Party into Fair Russia. In November 2006, he was the chairman of the revived Congress of Russian Communities. In April 2007, he announced that he might support the formation of the Great Russia Party, in conjunction with the Movement Against Illegal Immigration. The party said that it might consider supporting the candidacy of Belarusian president Alexander Lukashenko for the Presidency of Russia in 2008, a move that was unconstitutional because Lukashenko is not a Russian citizen. Because Russian authorities had not registered Great Russia, the party could not contest the legislative election in 2007.

=== Ambassador to NATO ===
In 2008, Rogozin was appointed by the Medvedev–Putin duumvirate as the Russian ambassador to NATO. As Russia's NATO envoy, he was heavily opposed to Ukraine and Georgia becoming members of NATO. After the two countries were denied membership of the NATO Membership Action Plan, he claimed, "They will not invite these bankrupt scandalous regimes to join NATO ... more so as important partnerships with Russia are at stake". For such words, he was criticized by some Ukrainian and Georgian officials. A former Ukrainian envoy to NATO, Ihor Sahach, said, "In my opinion, he is merely used as one of cogs in the informational war waged against Ukraine. Sooner or later, I think, it should be stopped". The envoy also expressed surprise at Rogozin's slang words: "It was for the first time that I heard such a higher official as envoy using this, I don't even know how to describe it, whether it was a slang or language of criminal circles ... I understand Russian, but, I'm sorry, I don't know what his words meant". The Foreign Minister of Ukraine Volodymyr Ohryzko stated that he did not regard the statement as serious.

On 18 February 2011, Russian president Dmitry Medvedev appointed Rogozin as the special representative on anti-missile defense; he negotiated with NATO countries on this issue.

=== Deputy prime minister ===
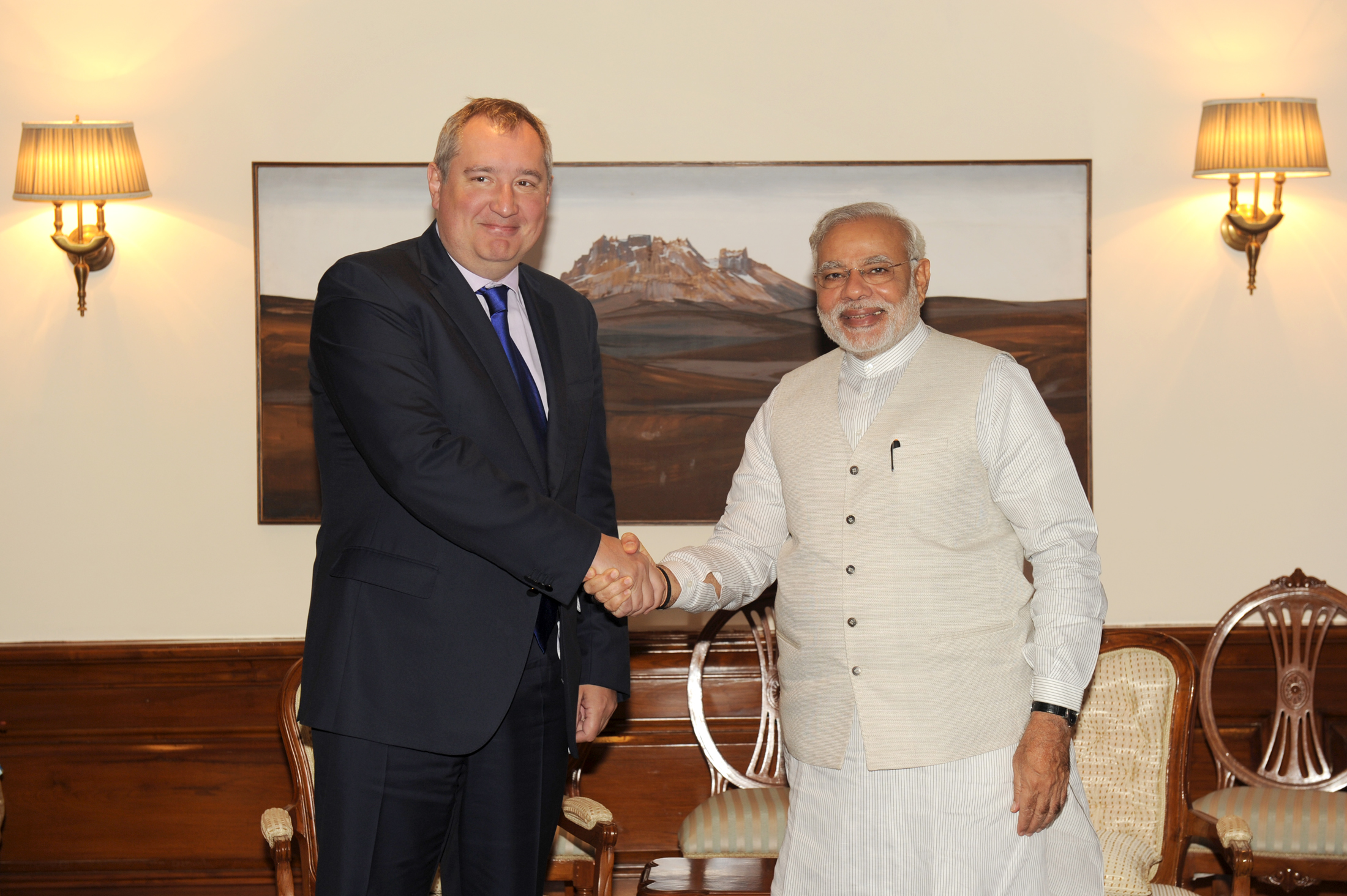
Rogozin with Indian prime minister Narendra Modi, in New Delhi, India, 5 November 2014

On 23 December 2011, Rogozin was appointed Putin's deputy prime minister in charge of the defense and space industries. For the defense industry, he led the creation of the Russian Foundation for Advanced Research Projects in the Defense Industry.

Sanctions

In 2014, Rogozin was involved in several diplomatic conflicts following the annexation of Crimea by the Russian Federation. On 17 March 2014, the day after the Crimean status referendum, Rogozin became one of the first seven people who were put under executive sanctions by US president Barack Obama. The sanctions froze his assets in the US and banned him from entering the country. He was also added to the United Kingdom, Canadian and to the EU sanction list due to the Russian annexation of Crimea.

In 2015, Rogozin stated that Russia's defence sector has "many other ways of traveling the world besides tourist visas" and "tanks don't need visas". On 29 April 2014, he tweeted: "After analyzing the sanctions against our space industry, I suggest to the USA to bring their astronauts to the International Space Station using a trampoline". On 31 May 2020, Elon Musk replied following the successful launch of Crew Dragon Demo-2, that "the trampoline is working".

On 10 May 2014, Rogozin started a diplomatic conflict between Romania and Russia after Romania barred his plane from entering its airspace. In response, he made two threatening posts on his Twitter account, one of which stated that next time, he would fly on board a Tupolev Tu-160 bomber carrying maximum payload.

Rogozin wrote a foreword for a book published in 2014, Alaska Betrayed and Sold: The History of a Palace Conspiracy, by Ivan Mironov. In it, Rogozin supported Mironov's claim that the sale of Alaska was a betrayal of Russian power status. The book argues for "the historical and judicial right of Russia for the return of the lost colonies, Alaska and the Aleutian Islands, over which the Russian flag flew 150 years ago". Rogozin stated that "Russia giving up its colonial possessions makes it necessary to look in a different way at our diplomacy in the era of Gorbachev and Yeltsin, trading away pieces of the Soviet Empire", labelling the historical narrative as "outright lies and falsifications" and arguing that "the liberal idols of the 19th century — the Russian reformers Alexander II and his brother Grand Duke Konstantin" — betrayed Russia's geopolitical interests and demonstrated "the impossibility of establishing diplomatic relations exclusively on concessions and compromises". Mironov had previously been accused of attempting to assassinate Anatoly Chubais, who had played a key role in Russia's privatizations, in 2005. He spent two years in prison before the Duma pardoned him. Rogozin finished his foreword with a call for Alaska and the Aleutian Islands to be returned to Russia.

In 2015, Rogozin was the head of Russia's Arctic Commission.

On 28 July 2017, he boarded an S7 Airlines commercial flight to Chișinău, where he would meet Moldovan President Igor Dodon, but the Romanian government again denied permission for the plane to enter its airspace, citing the "presence of a sanctioned person on board". The Boeing 737-800 went on a holding pattern in Hungarian airspace for a while, but after Hungary denied permission for landing and ordered the plane to leave, it was decided to divert to Minsk, Belarus, outside of the EU, reportedly with barely enough fuel to reach there. The plane later flew to Chișinău with the remaining passengers, but without Rogozin. The Deputy Prime-Minister later tweeted: "The Romanian authorities endangered the lives of passengers on an S7 flight, women and children. Fuel was [just] enough to [get to] Minsk. Wait for an answer, vermin!" Asked about Rogozin's threat, Romanian National Defense Minister Adrian Țuțuianu said: "I don't think we need to make this a discussion, we would be in the wrong attempting to escalate by all sorts of statements the statements made by others. I believe it's wise to mind our business and see to our program."

On 2 August 2017, he was declared persona non grata by the Government of Moldova.

=== Head of Roscosmos ===
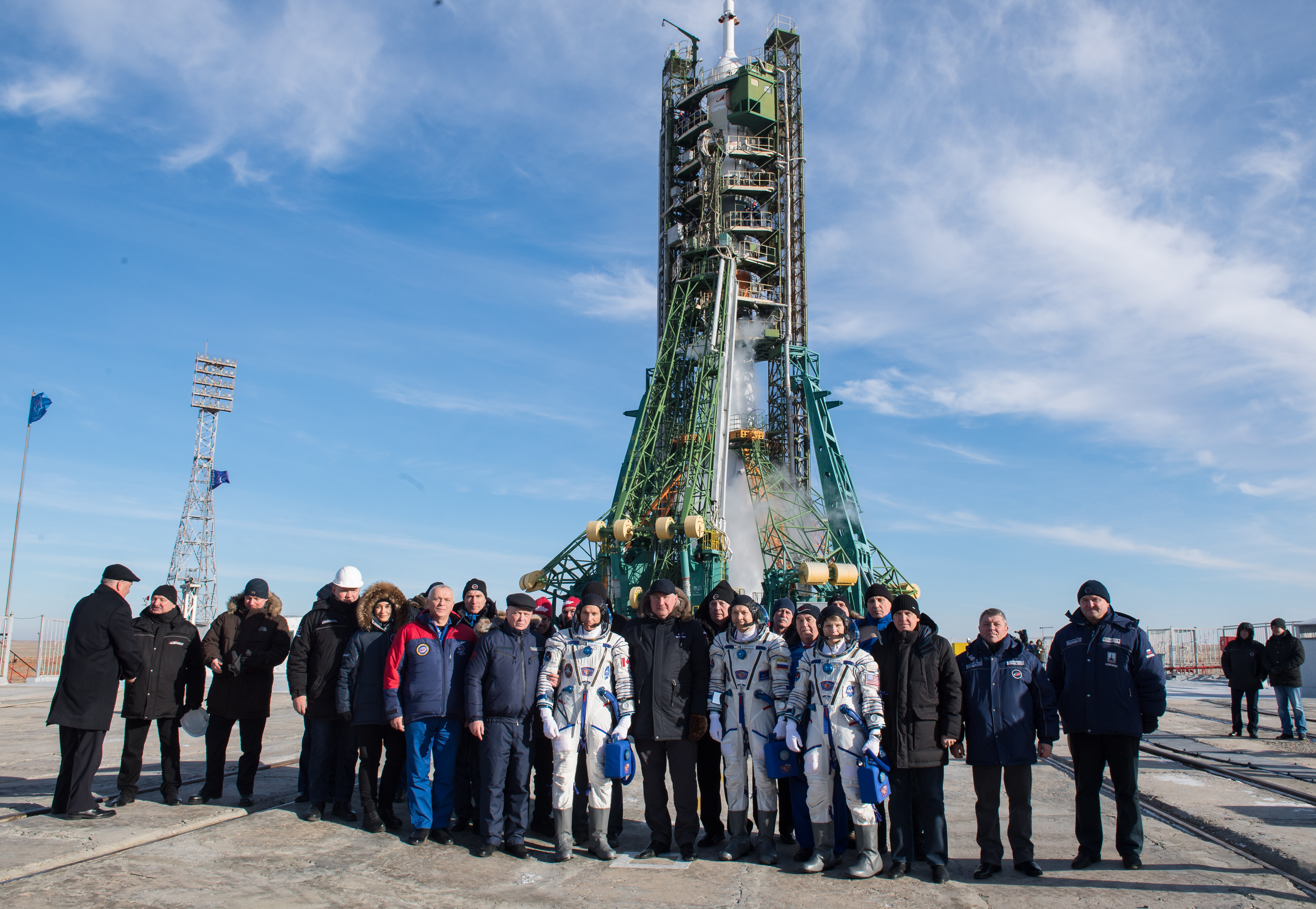
Rogozin with NASA, Roscosmos, and Canadian Space Agency (CSA) employees in Baikonur, Kazakhstan, 3 December 2018

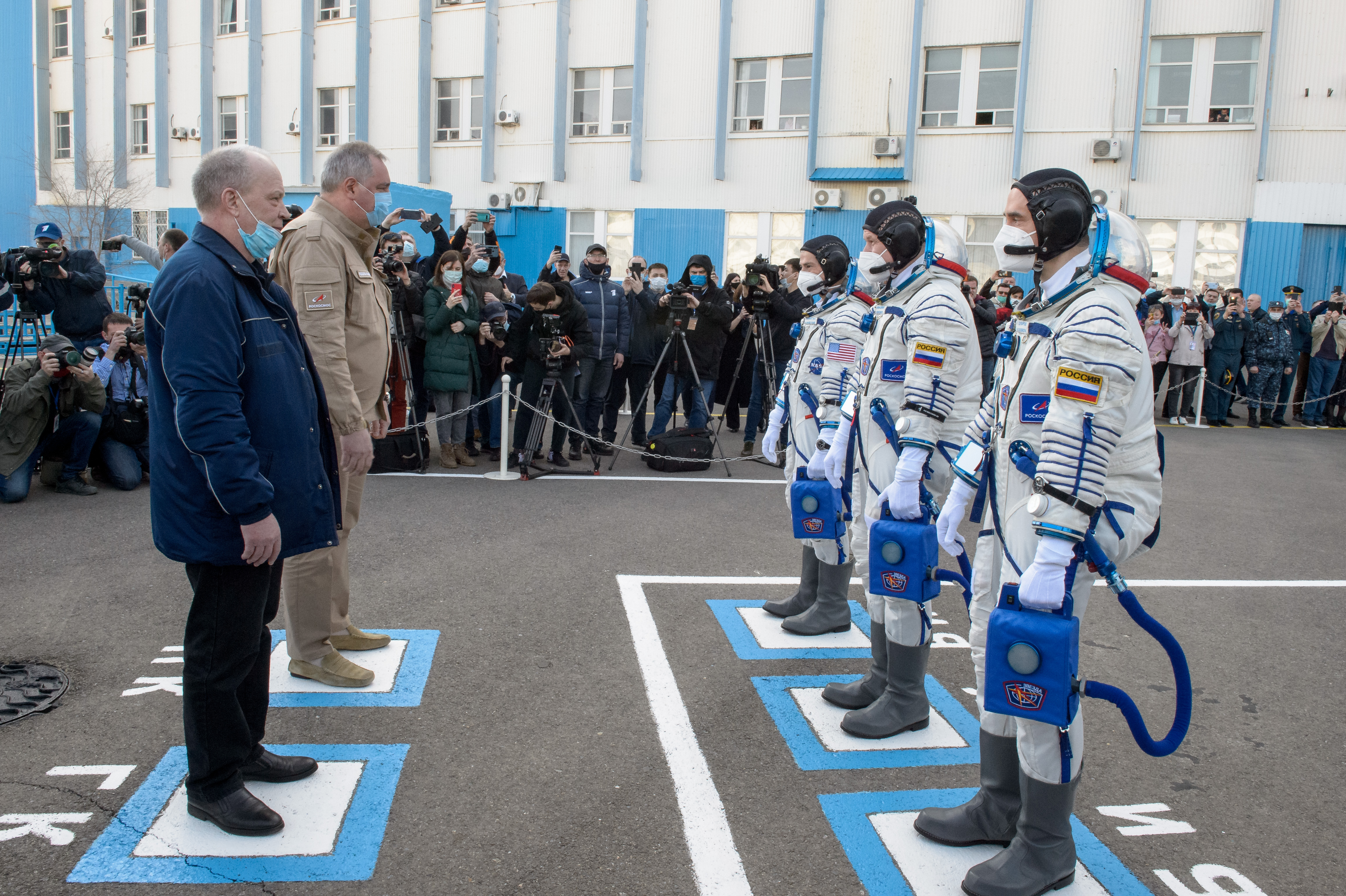
Rogozin with Mark T. Vande Hei, Oleg Novitsky and Pyotr Dubrov on 9 April 2021

In May 2018, Putin selected Rogozin to be the head of Roscosmos, the Russian state space agency for two decades after the early 1990s and, in the past few years, transformed by Rogozin from a state agency into a state corporation.

==== 2022 Russian invasion of Ukraine ====
On 24 February 2022, Rogozin stated on Twitter that the international sanctions during the Russo-Ukrainian War could lead to the uncontrolled deorbiting of the International Space Station onto the territory of multiple countries. He questioned "who will save the ISS from an uncontrolled deorbit and fall into the United States or Europe?" He additionally said that "There is also the option of dropping a 500-ton structure to India and China. Do you want to threaten them with such a prospect?", adding "The ISS does not fly over Russia, so all the risks are yours. Are you ready for them?" This was accompanied by a map displaying the possible crash zone, with the US, most of Europe, and the entire southern hemisphere covered. A Canadian broadcaster reported this as an apparent threat, while The Daily Telegraph stated that experts believe it could take years for the ISS to deorbit even without the Russian module. Rogozin criticized the sanctions that U.S. president Joe Biden said were designed to "degrade [Russia's] aerospace industry, including their space program".

On 26 February 2022, Rogozin posted a video threatening to leave US astronaut Mark T. Vande Hei in space and separate Russian modules of the space station altogether. In March Roscosmos produced a mocked-up video portraying this, with cosmonauts saying goodbye to Vande Hei and detaching the Russian segment from the ISS. The Telegraph reported that this video was provocative and sparked fears because Vande Hei was scheduled to return to Earth along with two Russian cosmonauts in a Russian Soyuz capsule on 30 March. President Biden protested and demanded an apology, which was refused by Rogozin.

On 2 March Rogozin posted on Twitter a video of workers removing the US, UK, and Japanese flags from a Soyuz rocket. He tweeted: "The launchers at Baikonur decided that without the flags of some countries, our rocket would look more beautiful". The Z symbol in support of the invasion was also seen being taped by technicians to launch equipment. The Indian flag was not shown to be removed. He banned Roscosmos employees from traveling abroad. These statements led to a public dispute with US astronaut Scott Kelly. In response to Kelly's criticism, Rogozin called him a "moron" and said "the death of the ISS will be on your conscience". NASA administrator Bill Nelson downplayed Rogozin's comments, saying "That’s just Dmitry Rogozin. He spouts off every now and then. But at the end of the day, he’s worked with us". He further commented "The other people that work in the Russian civilian space program, they're professional", and explained "The professional relationship between astronauts and cosmonauts, it hasn't missed a beat". NASA stated on 18 March, two weeks before the scheduled reentry of the Soyuz capsule, that the plan for returning Vande Hei to Earth had not changed.

On 2 April, Rogozin said that the aim of the American economic sanctions against Russia was to "kill the Russian economy and plunge our people into despair and hunger, to get our country on its knees". The next day he called for the lifting of sanctions on two Russian companies, TsNIIMash and Progress Rocket Space Centre, that are involved in the ISS.

On 10 May, Rogozin observed that StarLink owner Elon Musk had sent to the "militants of the Nazi Azov battalion" in Mariupol some equipment that allowed them better to survive the onslaught of the Russian invaders, and remarked to Musk that "You will be held accountable as an adult, no matter how much you play the fool."

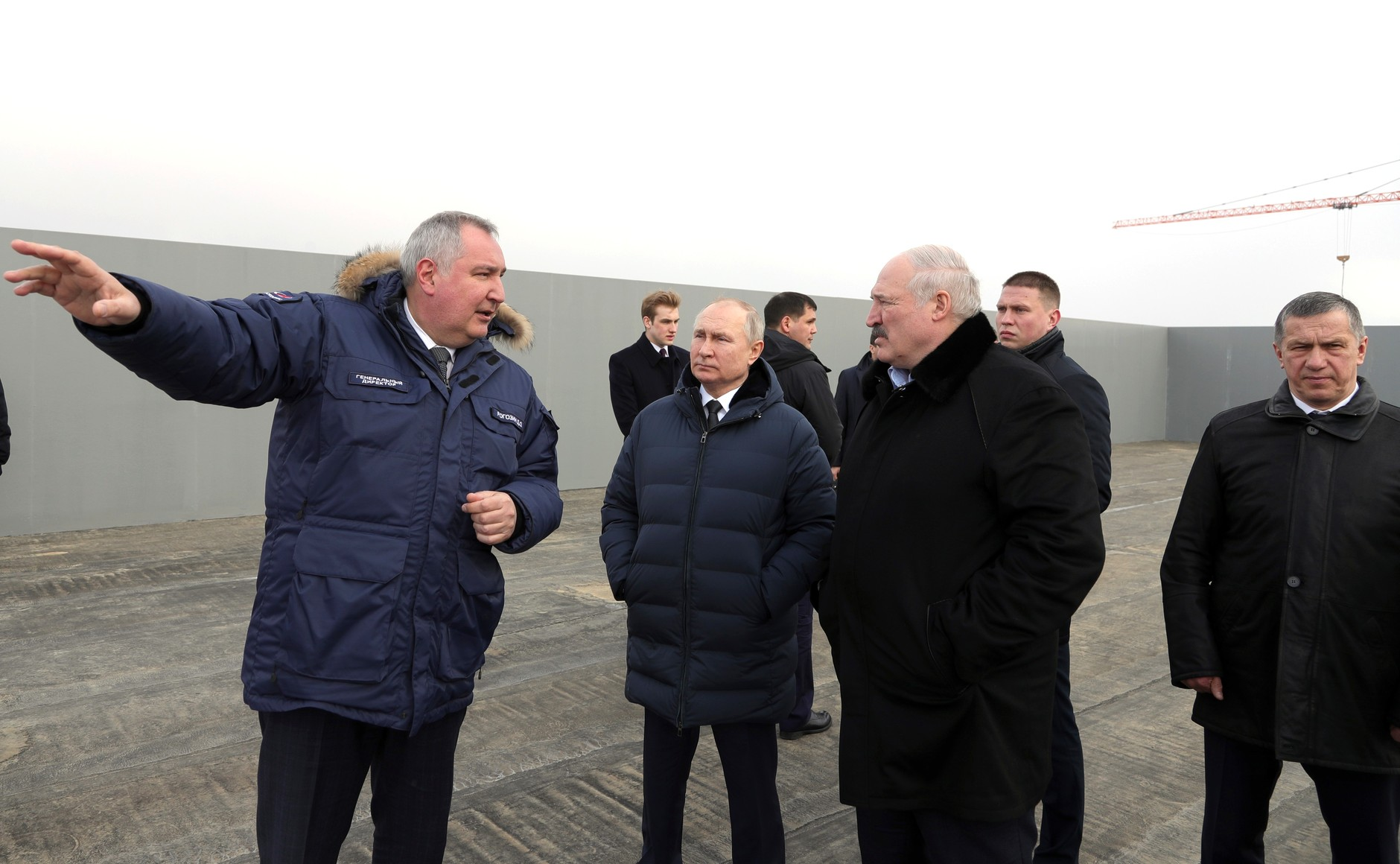
Rogozin, Putin and Alexander Lukashenko on 12 April 2022

On 22 May Rogozin warned that 50 new Satan II/RS-28 Sarmat/SS-X-30 intercontinental nuclear missiles would soon be combat ready. He said that "I suggest that aggressors speak to us more politely".

On 13 June Rogozin stated that Ukraine must be destroyed once and for all: "what appeared in the place of Ukraine is an existential threat to the Russian people, Russian history, Russian language and Russian civilization. If we do not put an end to them, as, unfortunately, our grandfathers failed to, our grandchildren will be dying while putting an end to them at even greater cost. So let's put an end to them. Once and for all. For the sake of our grandchildren."

On 28 June Rogozin had Roscosmos publish satellite images of the building in use for the 2022 NATO Madrid summit, as well as defense headquarters in France, UK, Germany and the US. The agency identified them all as "decision-making centers" that "support Ukrainian nationalists". Rogozin personally remarked that the satellite imagery firm Maxar maintained the government of Ukraine on its client list and he complained about the formation of a single cloud data pipeline from NATO to the Ukrainian military.

On 15 July 2022 Rogozin was dismissed from the position of the head of Roscosmos; former Vice Prime Minister Yury Borisov was appointed his successor. In October 2022, the Executive Director of Human Spaceflight Programs at Roscosmos, Sergei Krikalev, confirmed the reason for Rogozin's dismissal was to ease tensions.

=== After Roscosmos ===
In September 2022, critics of the war in Ukraine and mobilization used social media to ask top officials and pro-war activists supporting the Russian invasion of Ukraine whether they or their sons would go to the frontlines with the Russian military. Most of them either refused to answer or blocked the person asking, as was the case when the BBC asked Rogozin on Twitter whether he has advised his son Alexei to volunteer for military service.

As of December 2022, Rogozin had not been given a new job, though President Vladimir Putin's spokesman Dmitry Peskov told state news agency TASS in July 2022 that Rogozin would get a new job "in due time".

In the lack of an official position of power in Russia, Rogozin declared himself the head of the "Tsar's Wolves" inspection group of volunteers, with the stated aim of testing and supplying weapons for Russia's invasion of Ukraine. By early December 2022, Rogozin had been posting images of himself dressed up as a soldier in expensive military gear on Telegram. Wagner PMC commander Yevgeny Prigozhin said that "the actions of Rogozin in Ukraine are clearly being done for the purposes of public relations rather than furthering the Russian war effort."

On 21 December 2022, whilst celebrating his 59th birthday in a restaurant in Donetsk, Rogozin and Vitaliy Khotsenko, the chairman of the self-proclaimed separatist Donetsk People's Republic, received shrapnel injuries from the explosion of a precision munition fired by Ukraine. Rogozin, over a Telegram chat room, claimed someone had leaked his coordinates or general location in Donetsk. On 4 January 2023, Rogozin sent to the French ambassador in Moscow what he claimed was a shell fragment removed from his body by surgeons after he was wounded. He alleged that the shell had been fired by a French CAESAR self-propelled howitzer, and asked for the fragment to be given to French president Emmanuel Macron, adding that "nobody will evade responsibility for war crimes".

In May 2023, Rogozin expressed doubt that the US Apollo 11 mission really landed on the Moon in 1969, saying he had yet to see conclusive proof.

In 2023, he became the victim of a hoax when he added the fictional pro-Kremlin poet Gennady Rakitin as a "friend" on VKontakte.

==== Senator from Zaporozhye Oblast ====
On 23 September 2023, the governor of Russian-occupied Zaporozhye Oblast Yevgeny Balitsky appointed Rogozin as an aspirational senator from Zaporozhye Oblast. Following his appointment, Rogozin stated that it is an "honor for me to defend the interests of the Zaporozhye Oblast and Novorossiya as a whole". Russia does not control entire Zaporozhye Oblast and it specifically doesn't control its capital, the city of Zaporizhzhia, forcing the Russian authorities to rule the occupied area from Melitopol.

== Personal life ==
In the mid-2000s, Rogozin participated in ultranationalist rallies and was seen performing a Nazi salute.

In 2016, his son Alexei Rogozin was appointed deputy director of the Property Department of the Ministry of Defence.

According to anti-corruption activist Alexei Navalny, Rogozin earned while he led Roscosmos in 2018 a salary of 29.5 million rubles ($460,000), which is vastly higher than that of NASA's chief. Engineers at Roscosmos make about $10,000 a year. Rogozin owns a 800 m^{2} (8,600 sq ft) dacha north of Moscow worth about $3 million in 2019.

Government offices
Preceded by Igor Komarov	Director General of Roscosmos; 2018 – 2022	Succeeded by Yury Borisov
