= Aleksey Zhuravlyov (politician) =

Russian politician

Aleksey Zhuravlyov MP
- Алексей Журавлёв
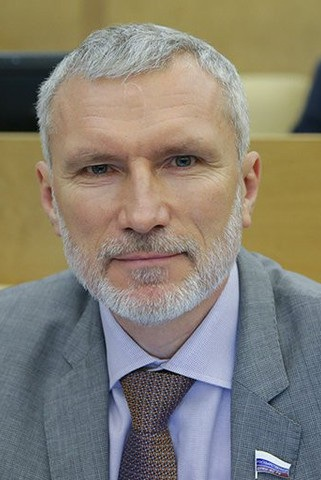
- Zhuravlyov in 2018

Leader of Rodina
- Incumbent
- Assumed office 29 September 2012
- Preceded by: Alexander Babakov

Member of the State Duma
- Incumbent
- Assumed office 21 December 2011
- Preceded by: Multi-member district
- Constituency: Neftekamsk (No. 6) (2026-) Tambov (No. 177) (2021-2026); Anna (No. 89) (2016-2021) Party List Seat (2011-2016)

Personal details
- Born: 30 June 1962 (age 64) Voronezh, RSFSR, USSR
- Party: Rodina
- Other political affiliations: Congress of Russian Communities; LDPR (since 2021); United Russia (2011-2016); A Just Russia (2006-2007); CPSU/CPRF (until 1993)
- Education: Voronezh Polytechnic Institute; RANEPA

Aleksey Aleksandrovich Zhuravlyov (born 30 June 1962) is a Russian nationalist politician serving as a member of the State Duma. Since 29 September 2016 he has been chairman of the Rodina political party. His views are often militarist, hawkish, and irredentist. In February 2022, he was sanctioned by the European Union for voting in favor of the recognition of separatist republics in Ukraine.

== Biography ==
Zhuravlyov was born 30 June 1962 in Voronezh in Soviet Union. In 1984 he graduated from Voronezh Polytechnic Institute majoring in "Physics of Metals". In 2004 he graduated from the Russian Academy of Public Administration under the President of the Russian Federation.

In 2001-2004 Zhuravlyov was an authorized representative of the Governor of the Voronezh Oblast Vladimir Kulakov in the Oblast Duma. In 2006–2007 he participated in the preparations for the creation of the party Great Russia led by Dmitry Rogozin. From 2009 to 2011, was an advisor to the governor of the Voronezh Oblast Alexey Gordeyev.

=== Federal politics ===
In 2011, the results of the primaries has been nominated as a candidate for deputy of the State Duma of the All-Russia People's Front for the party list of United Russia. In the elections, he was elected to the 6th State Duma.

On 29 September 2012, at the founding convention of the party Rodina Zhuravlev was elected as its chairman, while retaining his membership in the faction Rodina in the State Duma.

On 3 December 2013, Zhuravlyov got into a brawl with Adam Delimkhanov, a fellow member of the State Duma and cousin of Chechen leader Ramzan Kadyrov, losing two teeth in the process and landing in the hospital. Delimkhanov allegedly instigated the beating in Zhuravlyov's 15th floor Duma office after becoming irate over a letter written by Zhuravlev to Prosecutor General Yury Chaika requesting an investigation into a monument erected to female heroes of the 18th century Caucasian War in the Chechen village of Khangish-Yurt. The fight ended when staffers intervened and Delimkhanov brandished a gold plated pistol.

In the 2016 parliamentary election, he headed the party list of the Rodina, and ran through Anna Constituency. The party list of the Rodina did not overcome the 5% electoral threshold, however, won in his constituency. In the State Duma of the 7th convocation did not join any of the factions.

In 2020, he got taken in by a prank about a brothel for zoophiles. This was subsequently debunked by Russian commentator Rustem Agdamov, leaving Zhuravlyov with significant egg on his face.

In 2021, Zhuravlyov made negative comments about the participation of transgender athlete Laurel Hubbard in the 2020 Summer Olympics as a competitor in the Women's +87 kg Weightlifting section, condemning Hubbard's involvement in the competition as "smut and perversion." His comments were flatly condemned by news outlets from around the world, as well as the International Olympic Committee.

On 15 December 2021, Zhuravlyov appeared on the Russian television program 60 Minutes, advocating for the kidnapping and imprisonment of United States Congressman Ruben Gallego for his comments in support of providing arms and military training to Ukraine in the Russo-Ukrainian War. Gallego responded on Twitter with the message "fuck around and find out".

In January 2022, Zhuravlyov suggested that the Russian military should place nuclear weapons in Cuba and Venezuela in response to NATO military aid to Ukraine and Georgia, claiming that the alliance will use closer ties to position nuclear weapons near Russia's borders with the countries.

Appearing in a military uniform in a video posted to Instagram in February 2022, Zhuravlyov told his followers "the Russian world was and will be ours" and "all of Ukraine will be Russian." He also claimed "the Fatherland" was in danger from Ukraine, urging Russians to volunteer to fight in Donbas, and asserting he was "the first on the list of volunteers leaving for the south-east of Ukraine." Following the Russian government's recognition and invasion of the Donetsk and Luhansk People's Republics, Zhuravlyov called the move "a historical frontier, beyond which a fundamentally new era begins."

On 28 April 2022, he appeared on Russian state TV, threatening the West with Russian nuclear weapons, specifically saying that Russia can wipe out all of Germany, France, and Great Britain in less than 200 seconds. When presented with facts that Britain also possesses nuclear weapons, he preferred to double down on his threats.

On 30 August 2026, he advocated using nuclear weapons against Ukraine.

=== Sanctions ===
On 22 February 2022, Zhuravlyov was sanctioned by the European Union along with the other 350 members of the State Duma in retaliation for the vote in favor of recognition of the separatist republics of Ukraine in violation of the Minsk agreements, although the Russian government has argued that they were first violated by Ukraine by not granting the republics autonomy.

He was sanctioned by the UK government on 11 March 2022 in relation to the Russo-Ukrainian War.
