= Russian Foundation for Advanced Research Projects in the Defense Industry =

Foundation for Advanced Research Фонд перспективных исследований
Agency overview
- Formed: 2012; 14 years ago
- Headquarters: University Prospect 20, Moscow, Russia
- Employees: 240
- Agency executive: Andrei Grigoriev, Director
- Parent agency: Federal Government
- Website: fpi.gov.ru

Russian Foundation for Advanced Research Projects (Russian: Фонд перспективных исследований) is an advanced military research agency. The foundation is tasked with informing the country's leadership on projects that can ensure Russian superiority in defense technology. It will also analyze the risks of any Russian technological backwardness and technological dependence on other powers.

== History ==
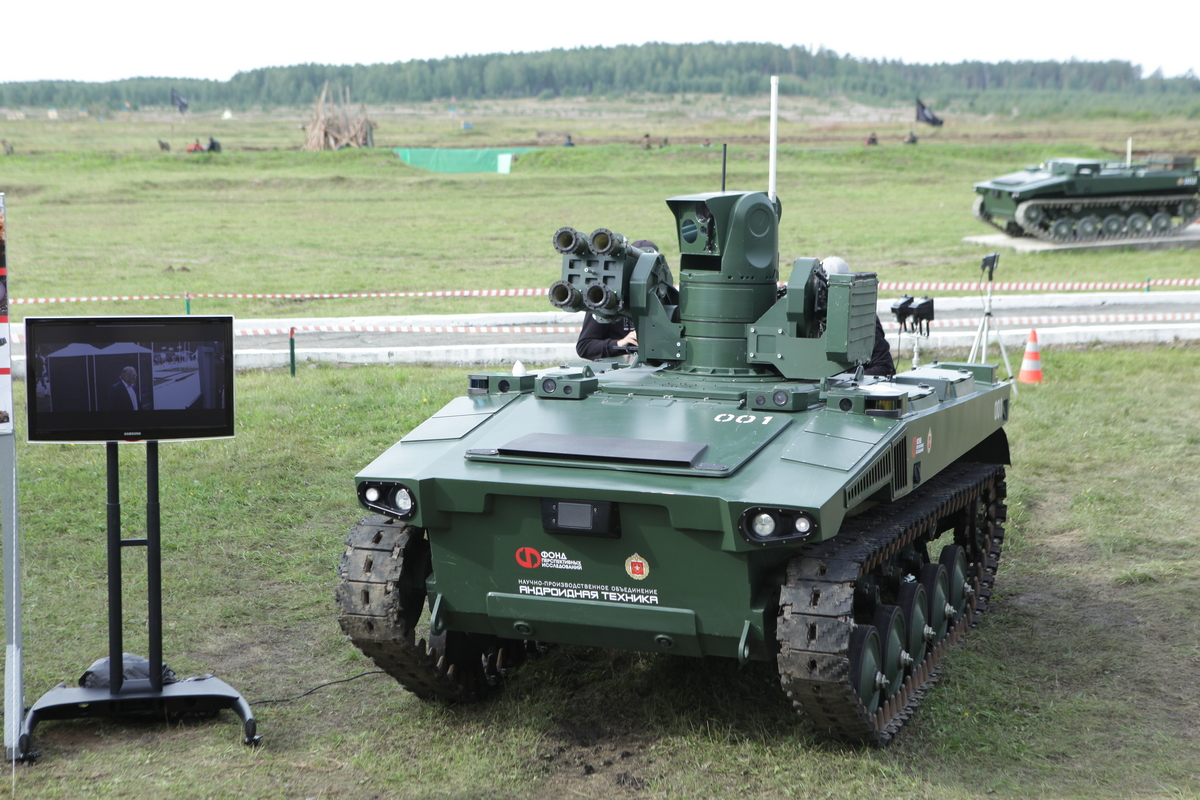
UGV marker combat

In June 2012, President Vladimir Putin submitted a bill on the foundation's establishment to parliament. In July 2012, the lower house of the Russian parliament, the State Duma, passed the law in first reading. Deputy Prime Minister Dmitry Rogozin said when he presented the draft law that "The sole purpose of this foundation is to close a gap in advanced research with our Western partners after 20 years of stagnation in the Russian military science and defense industry overall."

== See also ==
- Armed Forces of the Russian Federation
- Defense industry of Russia
- Military-Industrial Commission of Russia
