= Andrei Markov (footballer) =

Russian footballer

Personal information
- Full name: Andrei Aleksandrovich Markov
- Date of birth: 22 March 1984 (age 42)
- Height: 1.74 m (5 ft 9 in)
- Position: Midfielder

Senior career*
Years	Team	Apps	(Gls)
2001–2002	FC Pskov-2000-D Pskov		
2002–2004	Dinaburg FC	52	(2)
2005	FC Garant-Sport Novgorod		
2006–2007	Dinaburg FC	30	(0)
2007	FC Garant-Sport Novgorod		
2008	Dinaburg FC	5	(0)
2008	FC Dynamo Barnaul	24	(1)
2008	FK Ventspils	4	(0)
2009–2012	FC Dynamo Barnaul	89	(4)
2012	FC Avangard Kursk	16	(0)
2013	FC Dynamo Barnaul	8	(1)
2013–2014	FC Smena Komsomolsk-na-Amure	24	(5)
2014–2015	FC Dynamo Barnaul	24	(0)
2015–2016	FC Sakhalin Yuzhno-Sakhalinsk	15	(0)
2016	→ FC Dynamo Barnaul (loan)	4	(0)
2016–2017	FC Dynamo Barnaul	12	(0)
2017	FC Novokuznetsk (amateur)		
2018	FC Kyzyltash Bakhchisaray		
2018	FC Novokuznetsk (amateur)		
- * Club domestic league appearances and goals

Andrei Aleksandrovich Markov (Russian: Андрей Александрович Марков; born 22 March 1984) is a Russian former professional footballer.

== Club career ==
He played in the Russian Football National League for FC Dynamo Barnaul in 2008.
