= Alexander Lapin (photographer) =

Russian photographer

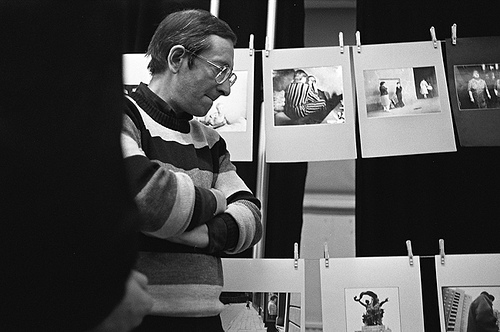
Alexander Lapin

Alexander Lapin (17 May 1945 – 25 October 2012), also known as Alesander Lupin, was a Russian photographer.

His work is included in the collection of the Museum of Fine Arts Houston, the Zimmerli Art Museum at Rutgers University and the Museum of Contemporary Photography.
