= Aleksandr Alekseyevich Lapin =

Alexander Alekseyevich Lapin
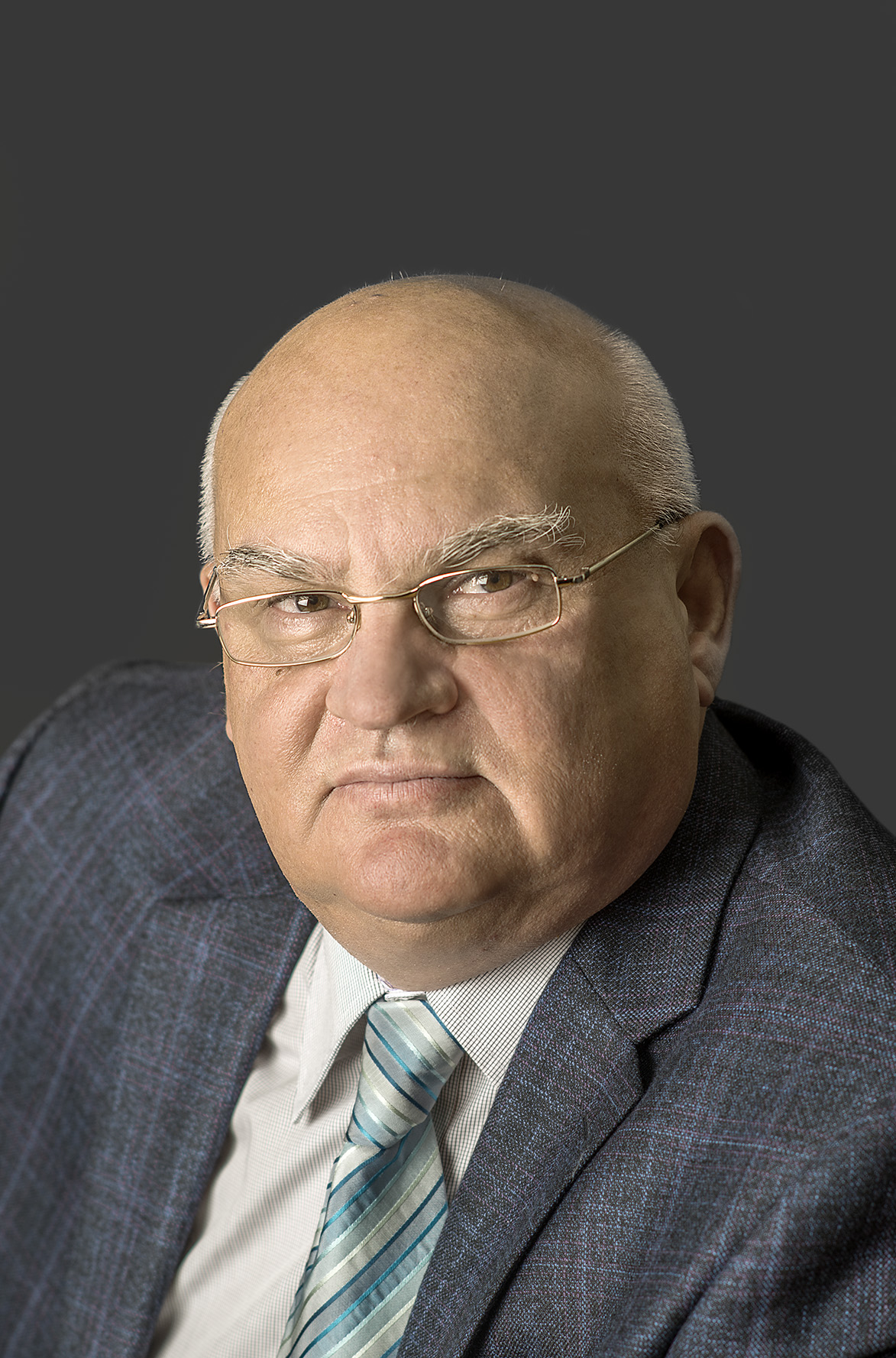
- Born: May 14, 1952; Prokhladnaya stanitsa, the Kabardino-Balkar ASSR, Soviet Union
- Occupations: Writer, journalist
- Writing career
- Genres: Novels, stories, short stories

Alexander Alekseyevich Lapin (born May 14, 1952, Prokhladnaya stanitsa, Kabardino-Balkaria, ASSR) is a Russian writer, columnist, social activist. He is editor-in-chief at the publishing house "Svobodnaya Pressa".

== Biography ==
Alexander Lapin was born in 1952 in the Cossack stanitsa of Prokhladnaya (the Kabardino-Balkar ASSR). In 1973 he entered and in 1978 graduated with honors from the Department of Journalism of the Kazakh State University. He worked as a reporter, executive editor, deputy editor-in-chief and subsequently as its editor-in-chief of one of the regional magazines. In 1986 he came to Komsomolskaya Pravda — a large national newspaper — as a staff reporter for Kazakhstan. Within the next 15 years he worked his way up from a journalist to one of the executives. The regional network of Komsomolskaya Pravda was created under his leadership. In 2000 he moved to Voronezh and established his own newspaper business. He headed it as editor-in-chief and director general until 2010. Alexander Lapin's publishing house "EURASIA-PRESS – 21ST CENTURY" publishes over 20 periodicals. It has publishing facilities and a distribution network and operates in 8 major cities of Central Russia. For 10 years Alexander Lapin has been the author and host of the weekly television program The Russian Question on regional television. He currently resides in the village of Sennoye in Voronezh Oblast, his focus is on literary activities. Most of the writer's renown was brought by his novel The Russian Cross. It is a "saga of a generation", the story of those who lived through radical changes in USSR and Russia in the late 20th and the early 21st centuries. The writer explores the characters that were formed by this era and creates several diverse storylines in which the philosophy of the main characters of the saga undergoes serious tests under the influence of the epoch-making changes in the society. Alexander Lapin is a member of the Union of Russian Writers.

== Public activities ==
Alexander Lapin is Head of the Voronezh department of the Russian Peace Foundation, deputy chairman of the committee of the Voronezh Oblast Duma for local self-government, public and mass media relations, President of the Voronezh Oblast Federation of traditional karate "Fudokai".

== Prizes and awards ==
- The Big Literary Prize of Russia (2019)
- The Russian Federation Government Prize for mass media (2015)
- The National Prize "The Best Books and Publishing Houses – 2014"
- The International Literary Prize named after Valentin Pikul
- The literary prize "Russian Positive"
