= Ruslan Gostev =

Russian politician (1945–2025)

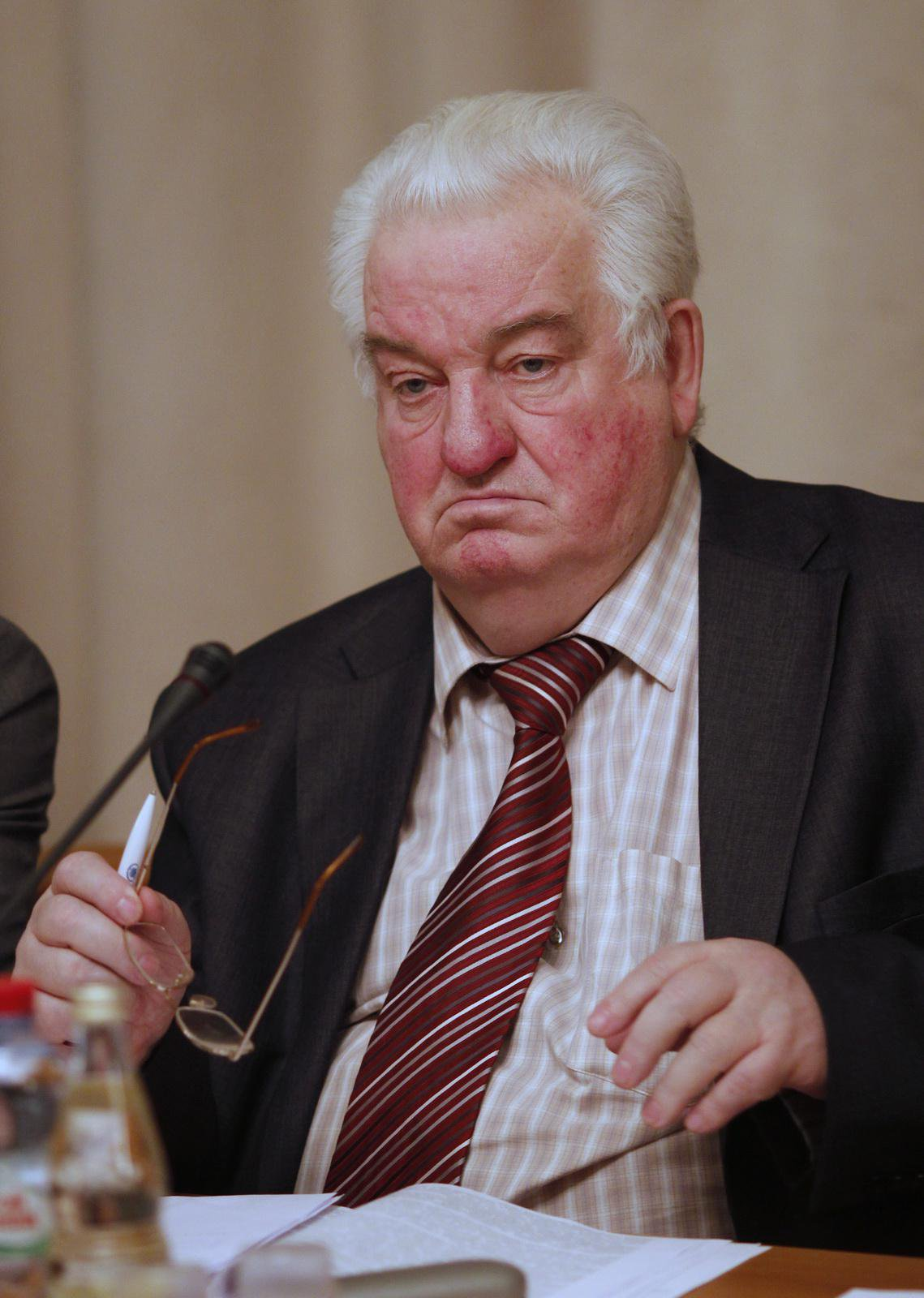
Gostev in 2013

Ruslan Georgievich Gostev (Russian: Русла́н Гео́ргиевич Го́стев; 11 January 1945 – 17 September 2025) was a Russian politician.

== Life and career ==
Gostev was born in Poti, Georgian SSR, USSR on 11 January 1945. He held the title of Deputy of the State Duma of the I-VI convocations (1993–2016) as a member of the Communist Party. He was the First Secretary of the Voronezh Regional Committee of the Communist Party of the Russian Federation in 1993–2008.

Gostev died on 17 September 2025, at the age of 80.
