= 2023 Voronezh Oblast gubernatorial election =

| ← 2018 | 8–10 September 2023 | 2028 → |
- Turnout: 51.05%
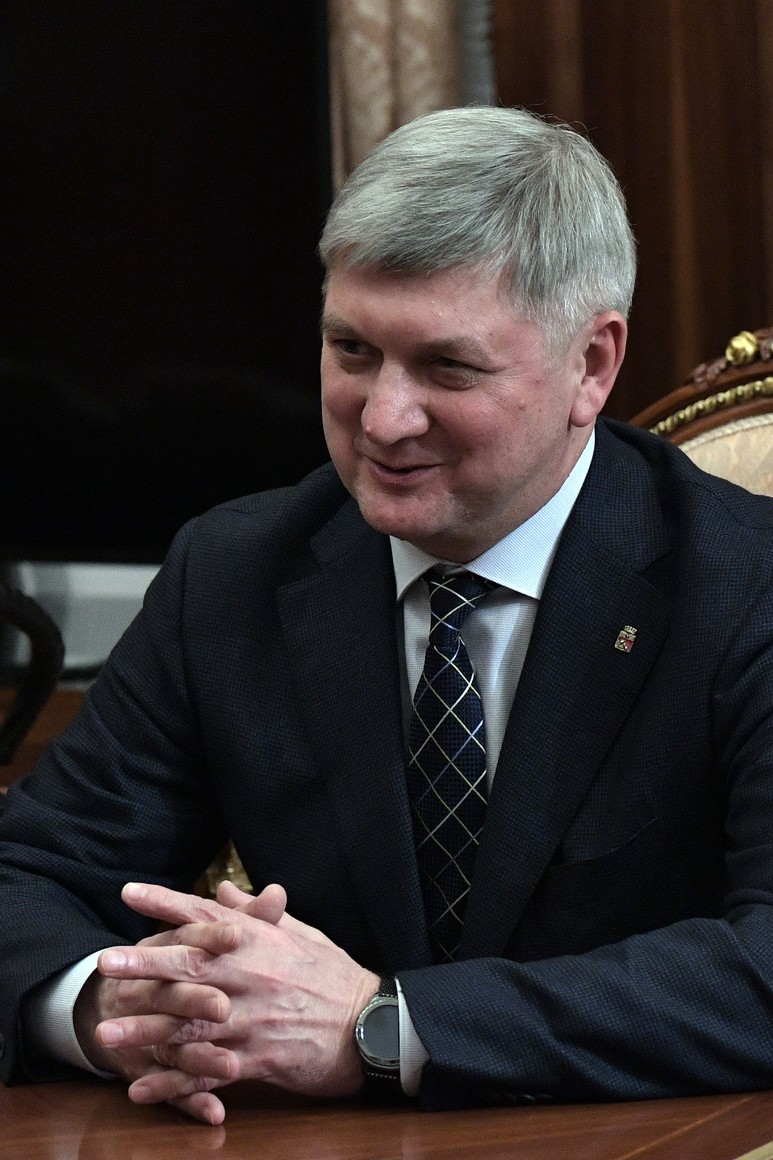
| | | CPRF | LDPR |
| Candidate | Aleksandr Gusev | Andrey Rogatnev | Pavel Bolshov |
| Party | United Russia | CPRF | LDPR |
| Popular vote | 713,150 | 78,914 | 52,212 |
| Percentage | 76.83% | 8.50% | 5.62% |
Governor before election
Aleksandr Gusev
United Russia
Governor-elect
Aleksandr Gusev
United Russia

The 2023 Voronezh Oblast gubernatorial election took place on 8–10 September 2023, on common election day. Incumbent Governor Aleksandr Gusev was re-elected to a second term in office.

== Background ==
Voronezh Mayor Aleksandr Gusev was appointed as an acting Governor of Voronezh Oblast in December 2017, replacing second-term incumbent Alexey Gordeyev, who was elevated to the position of Presidential Envoy to the Central Federal District. Gusev won gubernatorial election in September 2018 with 72.52% of the vote.

If Gusev forgoes his re-election bid and retires early, several candidates will be considered for his replacement, including Deputy Minister of Agriculture of Russia Maksim Uvaydov, Voronezh Oblast Duma Speaker Vladimir Netyosov, State Duma member Andrey Markov, Vice Governors Sergey Sokolov and Vitaly Shabalatov, and Deputy Prime Minister of Voronezh Oblast Artyom Verkhovtsev, all of whom are thought to be allies of Deputy Chairman of the State Duma Alexey Gordeyev, himself Governor of Voronezh Oblast in 2009–2017.

== Candidates ==
In Voronezh Oblast candidates for Governor can be nominated only by registered political parties, self-nomination is not possible. However, candidates are not obliged to be members of the nominating party. Candidate for Governor of Voronezh Oblast should be a Russian citizen and at least 30 years old. Candidates for Governor should not have a foreign citizenship or residence permit. Each candidate in order to be registered is required to collect at least 5% of signatures of members and heads of municipalities. Also gubernatorial candidates present 3 candidacies to the Federation Council and election winner later appoints one of the presented candidates.

=== Registered ===
- Pavel Bolshov (LDPR), Member of Voronezh Oblast Duma (2020–present)
- Igor Borisov (Rodina), Member of Bobrovsky District Council of People's Deputies (2022–present), businessman
- Aleksandr Gusev (United Russia), incumbent Governor of Voronezh Oblast (2017–present)
- Andrey Rogatnev (CPRF), Member of Voronezh Oblast Duma (2005–2010, 2015–present)
- Yaroslav Tarasov (SR–ZP), locksmith, public activist

=== Eliminated at United Russia primary ===
- Vadim Bashilov (United Russia), Head of Administration of Voronezh Levoberezhny District (2019–present)
- Roman Beresnev (United Russia), Head of Ramonsky District (2023–present)
- Sergey Filonenko (United Russia), rector of Voronezh State Pedagogical University

=== Declined ===
- Andrey Chekurin (New People), businessman
- Maksim Gusev (Rodina), Member of Povorinsky District Council of People's Deputies (2022–present)
- Dmitry Kuznetsov (SR–ZP), Member of State Duma (2021–present)
- Yevgeny Oryupin (SR–ZP), Member of Voronezh Oblast Duma (2022–present)
- Anton Tkachev (New People), Member of State Duma (2021–present) (ineligible due to age restrictions)

=== Candidates for Federation Council ===
- Pavel Bolshov (LDPR):
  - Vadim Chasovskikh, world kickboxing champion
  - Oksana Lukina, Voronezh State University of Engineering Technology associate professor
  - Aleksandr Ovsyannikov, Member of Voronezh Oblast Duma (2015–present)
- Igor Borisov (Rodina):
  - Aleksandr Borodin, businessman
  - Boris Skrynnikov, former mayor of Voronezh (2004–2008)
  - Aleksandr Strukov, businessman
- Aleksandr Gusev (United Russia):
  - Galina Karelova, incumbent Senator from Voronezh Oblast (2014–present), Deputy Chairwoman of the Federation Council (2014–present)
  - Viktor Lipinsky, aide to State Duma member Yevgeny Revenko
  - Valery Pyatetsky, deputy chairman of the United Russia regional office executive committee
- Andrey Rogatnev (CPRF):
  - Vladimir Kalinin, Member of Voronezh City Duma (2015–present)
  - Denis Roslik, Member of Voronezh Oblast Duma (2020–present)
  - Nikolay Rudov, Member of Novousmansky District Council of People's Deputies (2013–present)
- Yaroslav Tarasov (SR–ZP):
  - Aleksandr Babeshko, businessman
  - Yury Rublevsky, community activist
  - Anna Stupnikova, accountant

== Results ==
Summary of the 8–10 September 2023 Voronezh Oblast gubernatorial election results
| Candidate | Party | Votes | % |
|---|---|---|---|
| Aleksandr Gusev (incumbent) | United Russia | 713,150 | 76.83 |
| Andrey Rogatnev | Communist Party | 78,914 | 8.50 |
| Pavel Bolshov | Liberal Democratic Party | 52,212 | 5.62 |
| Yaroslav Tarasov | A Just Russia — For Truth | 41,886 | 4.51 |
| Igor Borisov | Rodina | 30,016 | 3.23 |
| Valid votes | | 916,178 | 98.70 |
| Blank ballots | | 12,067 | 1.30 |
| Total | | 928,245 | 100.00 |
| Turnout | | 928,245 | 51.05 |
| Registered voters | | 1,818,236 | 100.00 |

Governor Gusev re-appointed incumbent Deputy Chairwoman of the Federation Council Galina Karelova to the chamber.

== See also ==
- 2023 Russian regional elections
