= Vladimir Netyosov =

Russian politician (born 1970)

- Владимир Нетёсов
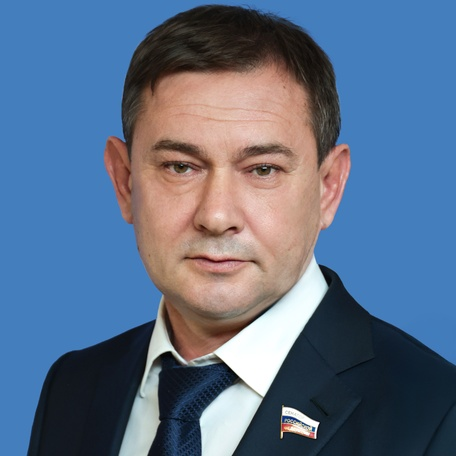

Senator from Voronezh Oblast
- Incumbent
- Assumed office 3 October 2025
- Preceded by: Sergey Lukin

Chairman of the Voronezh Oblast Duma
- In office 25 September 2015 – 14 September 2025
- Preceded by: Vladimir Klyuchnikov
- Succeeded by: Yuri Matuzov

Personal details
- Born: 29 October 1971 (age 54) Cherepovets, RSFSR, Soviet Union
- Party: United Russia
- Education: Voronezh State University of Forestry and Technologies; Voronezh State Technological Academy

Military service
- Branch/service: Soviet Armed Forces
- Years of service: 1988-1989

Vladimir Ivanovich Netyosov (Russian: Владимир Иванович Нетёсов; born March 7, 1970, Voronezh) is a Russian statesman and political figure. Since October 3, 2025, he has been a senator of the Federation Concil from the Voronezh Oblast Duma and a member of the Committee on Federal Structure, Regional Policy, Local Self-Government, and Northern Affairs.

== Biography ==
He was born March 7, 1970, in Voronezh, Voronezh Oblast, Soviet Union.

In 1988, at the age of 18, he was conscripted into the Soviet Armed Forces. He served there from 1988 to 1989.

After serving in the army in 1989, he entered the Voronezh Forestry Institute of the Order of Friendship of Peoples. In 1994, the institute was renamed an academy. Also in 1994, Vladimir Netyosov graduated from the Voronezh State Forestry Academy (VGLTA) with a degree in engineering.

=== Business career ===
He began his career in 1994 at Promstroyexport LLC, which he left in 1998 as CFO.

From 1998 to 2001, he served as development director at Ald CJSC.

From 2001 to 2004, he worked at the Voronezh Oblast State Unitary Enterprise "Voronezhinvest," first as Deputy General Director, then as General Director. Voronezhinvest was established in 2001 to improve the agricultural sector in the Voronezh Region. It united 39 agricultural enterprises in six districts of the region, with approximately 150,000 hectares of arable land. The initiative was initiated by Governor Vladimir Kulakov and First Vice Governor Sergei Naumov. Mark Berkolaiko was appointed General Director. In July 2004, Berkolaiko resigned as General Director, and Commercial Director Vladimir Netyosov took over. That same year, bankruptcy proceedings began for Voronezhinvest. The state unitary enterprise transferred its assets to district subsidiaries, which were later purchased by district authorities. Netyosov served as General Director for several months.

From 2004 to 2005, he served as Vice-Rector for Innovation and Development Programs at the Voronezh Institute for Advanced Training and Agribusiness, located at 3 Darvin Street in Voronezh.

In 2005, he earned a second degree from the Voronezh State Technological Academy (qualification: economist and manager).

On December 25, 2004, elections to the 4th convocation of the Voronezh Oblast Duma were scheduled in the Voronezh Oblast. The election campaign began on December 28. Fifty-six deputies were elected under a mixed system: 28 deputies from single-mandate constituencies and 28 from political party lists. On January 19, the candidate lists of the Rodina party were certified. Vladimir Netyosov was included on the Rodina party's regional list under number ninth. Elections were held on March 20, 2005. The Rodina party list received 21.02% of the vote and won eight seats. Netyosov did not receive a seat.

From 2005 to 2007, he was the director of VSM-Leasing LLC. The company supplied agricultural machinery under federal leasing terms and was the operator of Rosagroleasing OJSC.

From 2007 to 2010, he was the director of the Voronezh Oblast State Unitary Enterprise Voronezhobllising, located at 68 9 Yanvarya Street in Voronezh. The company specialized in leasing agricultural machinery.

=== Voronezh Oblast Duma ===
==== 4th Convocation (2009–2010) ====
On December 26, 2008, one of the seats won by the Rodina party list became vacant. Businessman Alexei Bazhanov, number eight on the Rodina electoral list, was appointed Deputy Minister of Agriculture of the Russian Federation.[4] By that time, the Rodina party had been transformed into the A Just Russia party. The vacant seat in the A Just Russia faction was expected to be filled by Vladimir Netyosov, as the next candidate on the list. In early 2009, the electoral commission transferred the vacant seat to him.

In the 4th convocation of the Voronezh Oblast Duma, Netyosov served as a deputy on a temporary basis. In June 2009, the leadership of the A Just Russia faction in the Voronezh Oblast Duma changed. Alexander Kornev, the bankrupt businessman and principal owner of the Voronezh Construction Plant-2000 (VSK-2000) group of companies,

In February 2010, Voronezhoblizing State Unitary Enterprise was included in the list of regional state unitary enterprises of the Voronezh Oblast slated for privatization in 2010–2012. In September 2010, by order of M.I. Uvaidov, Head of the Department of Property and Land Relations of the Voronezh Region, Voronezhoblizing State Unitary Enterprise was privatized and transformed into Voronezhoblizing OJSC. In October 2010, Alexey Simonov replaced Netyosov as CEO of Voronezhoblizing OJSC.

==== 5th Convocation (2010–2015) ====
On December 12, 2009, elections for deputies to the 5th convocation of the Voronezh Oblast Duma were scheduled. Vladimir Netyosov was nominated by the United Russia party in single-mandate constituency No. 19, Borisoglebsky (the district center is Borisoglebsk), which had a total of 62,513 voters. A total of five candidates were registered in the constituency: United Russia, the Communist Party of the Russian Federation, the Liberal Democratic Party of Russia, A Just Russia, and Right Cause. Governor of Voronezh Oblast Alexey Gordeyev, serving as the leading candidate on the United Russia party list, was the first candidate.

On March 14, 2010, elections for deputies to the 5th convocation of the Voronezh Oblast Duma were held. In constituency No. 19, with a turnout of 42.7% (26,693 voters), Vladimir Netyosov received the majority of votes - 52.6% (14,042 votes). Second place was taken by Alexander Sukhinin from the Communist Party of the Russian Federation (18.2%), third place was taken by Sergei Zhuravlev from the Liberal Democratic Party of Russia (15.7%). Thus, Netyosov was elected as a deputy from the United Russia party in single-mandate electoral district No. 19 Borisoglebsky. On March 30, 2010, at the first meeting, Vladimir Klyuchnikov (United Russia) was again elected chairman, and acting head of the regional branch of United Russia Irina Trankova was elected vice-speaker. Netyosov took the post of chairman of the Voronezh Regional Oblast committee on entrepreneurship and tourism. Evgeny Kitaev became his deputy.

From March 2010 to May 2011, he served as Chairman of the Voronezh Oblast Duma Committee on Entrepreneurship and Tourism.

At the end of May 2011, deputies amended the charter to introduce the position of Second Deputy Speaker in the Voronezh Oblast Duma. Netyosov was then approved for this position. Since May 2011, he has served as Deputy Chairman of the Voronezh Oblast Duma.

In June 2011, at a conference of the Voronezh regional branch of United Russia, Second Deputy Speaker of the Voronezh Oblast Duma Vladimir Netyosov was approved as the head of the branch and Secretary of the Political Council of the Voronezh regional branch of the United Russia party. He replaced Irina Trankova, Deputy Speaker of the Voronezh Oblast Duma. Voronezh Oblast Duma Speaker Vladimir Klyuchnikov described Vladimir Netesov as a young, talented manager and noted his victory in the difficult Borisoglebsk district.

Since August 2011, he has been the leader of the United Russia faction in the Voronezh Oblast Duma.

Since May 2012, he has been a member of the United Russia party's General Council.

On November 9, 2012, he was re-elected as Secretary of the Voronezh Regional Branch of the United Russia party.

==== 6th convocation (2015–2020) ====
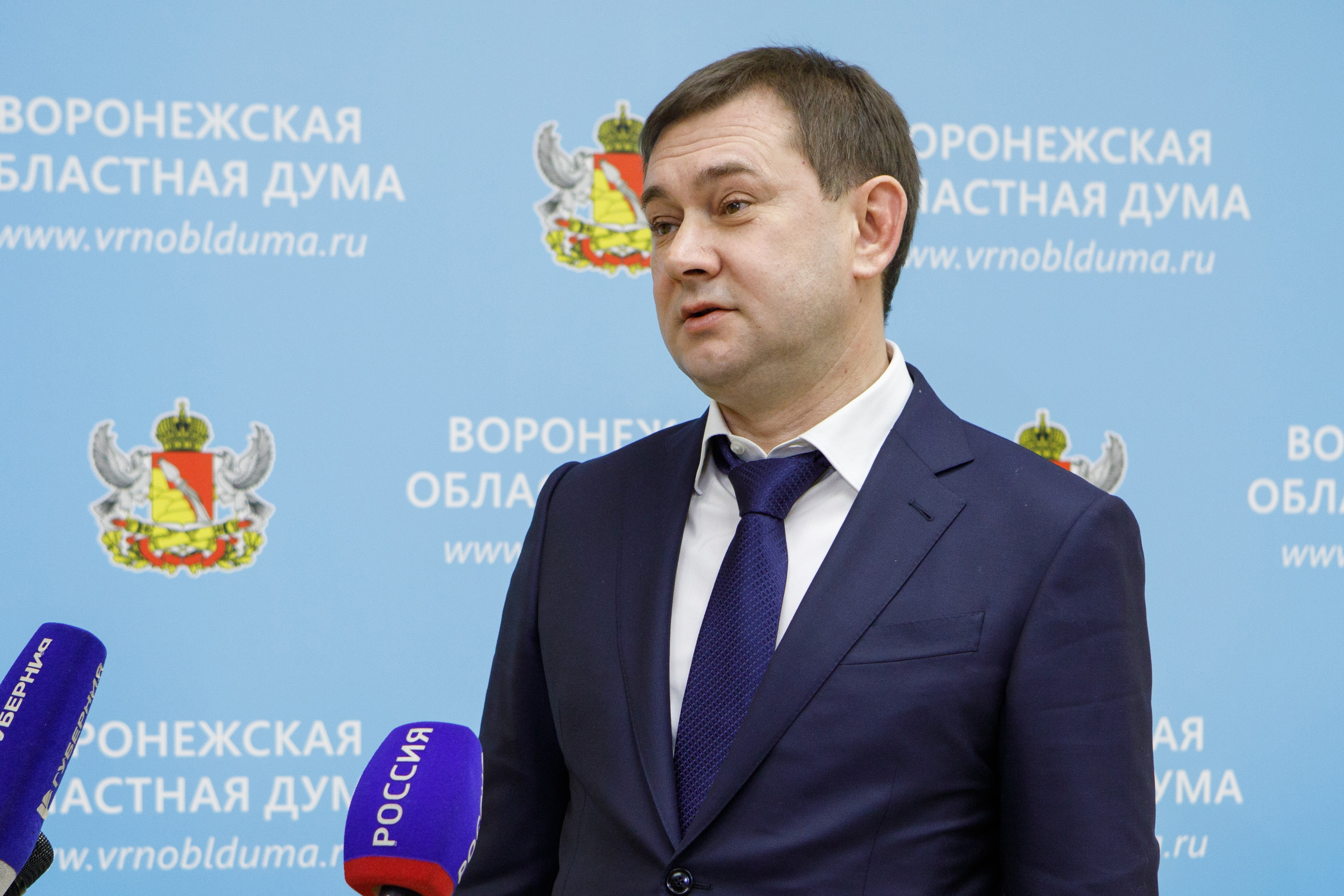
Vladimir Netesov in the Voronezh Oblast Duma, 2020

.

On September 13, 2015, elections for deputies to the 6th convocation of the Voronezh Oblast Duma were held. Vladimir Netesov was nominated on the United Russia party list, where he was number two on the general election list (Gordeev, Netesov, and Ippolitova). Voronezh Oblast Governor Alexei Gordeev, who served as the "locomotive" of the party, was again nominated first on the list. United Russia garnered 73.84% of the votes, and its party list secured 23 of the 28 seats. Netesov again became a deputy of the Voronezh Oblast Duma.

On September 25, 2015, at its first meeting, he was elected Chairman of the 6th Voronezh Oblast Duma. United Russia's leadership credited him with the party's "excellent" performance in the September 13 elections to the Voronezh Oblast Duma—73.84% of the votes and 51 of 56 seats in the regional parliament. Sergei Rudakov, head of the regional Communist Party committee, was elected deputy chairman.

Since November 23, 2019, he has been a member of the Presidium of the General Council of the United Russia party.

==== 7th Convocation (2020–2025) ====
On September 13, 2020, elections for deputies to the Voronezh Oblast Duma of the 7th convocation were held. Vladimir Netesov was again nominated on the United Russia party list, where he was number two on the general section (Gusev, Netesov, and Ippolitova). Voronezh Oblast Governor Aleksandr Gusev, acting as the "locomotive," was again nominated first on the list. In the elections, United Russia received 61.52% of the vote, and its party list received 21 of the 28 seats. Netesov again became a deputy of the Voronezh Oblast Duma.

On September 24, 2020, at the first meeting, he was elected Chairman of the Voronezh Oblast Duma of the 7th convocation. In 2021, he graduated from the Russian Presidential Academy of National Economy and Public Administration with a master's degree in Public and Municipal Administration.

In January 2025, political scientist Dmitry Orlov expressed the opinion that Vladimir Netesov might resign as Chairman of the Voronezh Oblast Duma after the September 2025 elections.

==== 8th Convocation (2025) ====
On September 14, 2025, elections for deputies to the 8th convocation of the Voronezh Oblast Duma were held. Vladimir Netesov was again nominated on the United Russia party list, where he was number two on the general list (Gusev, Netesov, and Yerakhovets). Governor of Voronezh Oblast Alexander Gusev, acting as the "locomotive", was again nominated first on the list. In the elections, United Russia received 73.88% of the vote, and its party list received 23 of the 28 seats. Netesov again became a deputy of the Voronezh Oblast Duma.

On October 3, 2025, the first day of the 8th convocation of the Voronezh Oblast Duma, Yuri Matuzov was elected chairman. That same day, at the second meeting, Vladimir Netesov was elected as a senator from the Voronezh Oblast Duma to the Federation Council. 53 out of 54 deputies voted for him. After this, Netesov resigned his seat. On November 7, the electoral commission transferred his seat to Dmitry Khvastunov.

=== Federation Council ===
On October 22, 2025, he joined the Federation Council's Committee on Federal Structure, Regional Policy, Local Government and Northern Affairs. On November 5, 2025, as a senator, he met with Governor Alexander Gusev.

=== Public Activities ===
On February 7, 2017, Vladimir Netesov was elected chairman of the Board of Trustees of the Voronezh Regional Branch of the All-Russian Public Charitable Foundation "Russian Children's Fund".

On December 21, 2017, Chairman of the Voronezh Oblast Duma Vladimir Netesov was elected chairman of the Board of Trustees of the Voronezh State Medical University (VSMU).
