= 2025 Voronezh Oblast legislative election =

Regional legislative election in Russia

← 2020	12–14 September 2025	2030 →

All 56 seats in the Oblast Duma 29 seats needed for a majority
- Turnout: 54.81% ▲10.67 pp
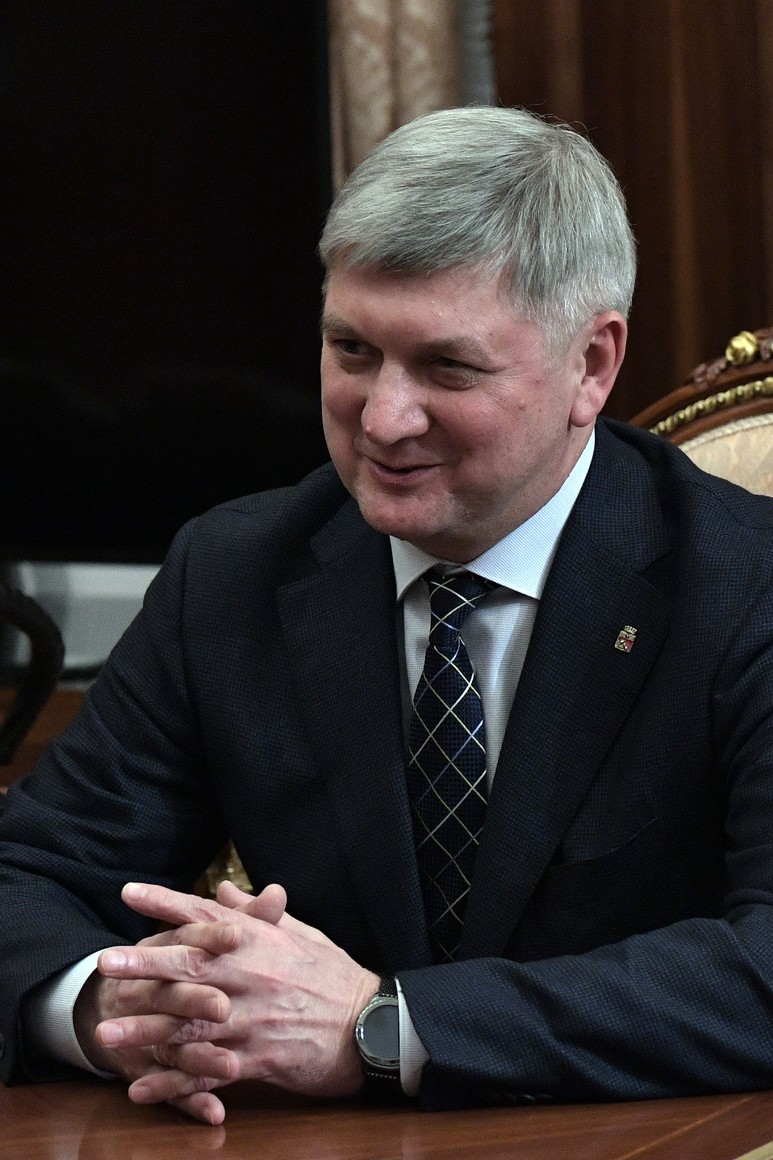

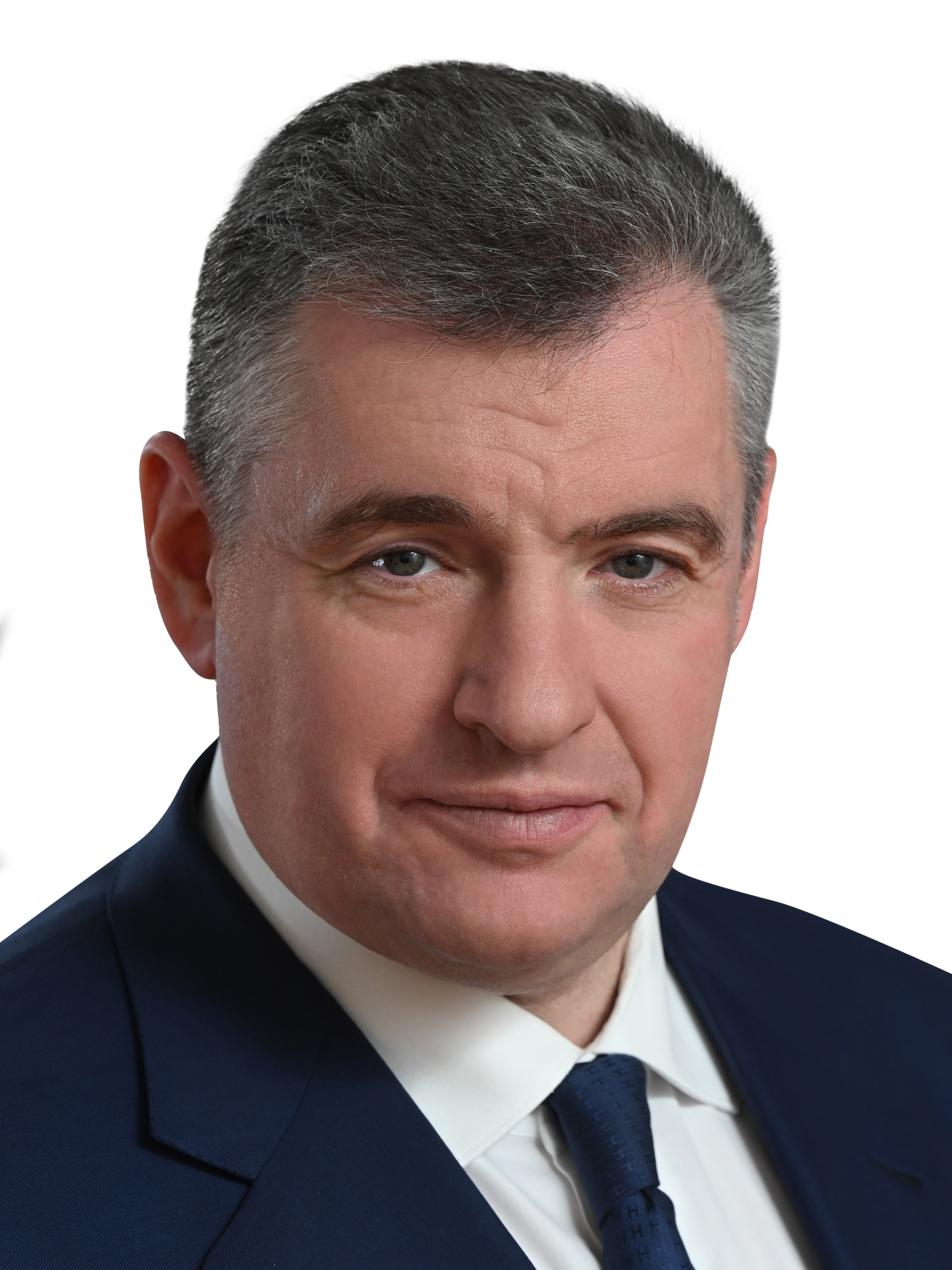
	Majority party	Minority party	Third party
		CPRF
Candidate	Aleksandr Gusev	Andrey Rogatnev	Leonid Slutsky
Party	United Russia	CPRF	LDPR
Last election	61.52%, 48 seats	14.50%, 4 seats	7.32%, 2 seats
Seats won	51	3	1
Seat change	▲3	▼1	▼1
Popular vote	728,073	91,310	57,152
Percentage	73.88%	9.26%	5.80%
Swing	▲12.36 pp	▼5.24 pp	▼1.52 pp
	Fourth party	Fifth party	Sixth party
	NL	SR–ZP	Rodina
Candidate	Sergey Gurchenko	Vasily Yaitskikh	Igor Borisov
Party	New People	SR–ZP	Rodina
Last election	Failed to qualify	5.69%, 2 seats	1.93%, 0 seats
Seats won	1	0	0
Seat change	Failed to qualify	▼2	Steady
Popular vote	55,901	22,108	15,893
Percentage	5.67%	2.24%	1.61%
Swing	Failed to qualify	▼3.45 pp	▼0.32 pp
Chairman before election
Vladimir Netyosov
United Russia
Elected Chairman
Yury Matuzov
United Russia

The 2025 Voronezh Oblast Duma election took place on 12–14 September 2025, on common election day. All 56 seats in the Oblast Duma were up for re-election.

United Russia increased its already overwhelming majority in the Oblast Duma, winning 73.9% of the vote and all 28 single-mandate constituencies. Communist Party of the Russian Federation and Liberal Democratic Party of Russia lost one seat each, while A Just Russia – For Truth suffered heavy defeat, losing more than half of its vote share and entire two-member faction. New People entered the Oblast Duma for the first time.

== Electoral system ==
Under current election laws, the Oblast Duma is elected for a term of five years, with parallel voting. 28 seats are elected by party-list proportional representation with a 5% electoral threshold, with the other half elected in 28 single-member constituencies by first-past-the-post voting. Seats in the proportional part are allocated using the Imperiali quota, modified to ensure that every party list, which passes the threshold, receives at least one mandate.

== Candidates ==
=== Party lists ===
To register regional lists of candidates, parties need to collect 0.5% of signatures of all registered voters in Voronezh Oblast.

The following parties were relieved from the necessity to collect signatures:

- United Russia
- Communist Party of the Russian Federation
- Liberal Democratic Party of Russia
- A Just Russia — Patriots — For Truth
- New People
- Rodina

№	Party	Republic-wide list	Candidates	Territorial groups	Status
1	New People	Sergey Gurchenko • Tatyana Andriyevskikh • Aleksey Vetokhin	84	28	Registered
2	Communist Party	Andrey Rogatnev • Denis Roslik • Oleg Spivak	74	28	Registered
3	United Russia	Aleksandr Gusev • Vladimir Netyosov • Yury Yerakhovets	85	28	Registered
4	Liberal Democratic Party	Leonid Slutsky • Natalya Voziyanova • Aleksandr Ovsyannikov	81	27	Registered
5	A Just Russia – For Truth	Vasily Yaitskikh • Artyom Rymar • Dmitry Kukharenko	84	28	Registered
6	Rodina	Igor Borisov • Maksim Klepikov • Irina Prishchepova	67	20	Registered

New People will take part in Voronezh Oblast legislative election for the first time after failing to qualify last cycle. Russian Party of Pensioners for Social Justice and Party of Direct Democracy, which participated in the last election, did not file, while For Truth has been dissolved since.

=== Single-mandate constituencies ===
28 single-mandate constituencies were formed in Voronezh Oblast. To register candidates in single-mandate constituencies need to collect 3% of signatures of registered voters in the constituency.

Number of candidates in single-mandate constituencies
Party	Candidates	
Party	Nominated	Registered
United Russia	28	28
Communist Party	26	25
Liberal Democratic Party	24	18
A Just Russia – For Truth	26	24
Rodina	25	24
New People	24	23
Independent	2	0
Total	155	142

== Polls ==
Fieldwork date	Polling firm	UR	CPRF	LDPR	NL	SR-ZP	Rodina
14 September 2025	2025 election	73.9	9.3	5.8	5.7	2.2	1.6
20–22 August 2025	Russian Field	52.8	13.1	13.1	10.8	6.5	1.8
13 September 2020	2020 election	61.5	14.5	7.3	–	5.7	1.9

== Results ==
=== Results by party lists ===
Summary of the 12–14 September 2025 Voronezh Oblast Duma election results
Party	Party list					Constituency		Total	
Party	Votes	%	±pp	Seats	+/–	Seats	+/–	Seats	+/–
United Russia	728,073	73.88	▲12.36	23	▲2	28	▲1	51	▲3
Communist Party	91,310	9.26	▼5.24	3	▼1	0	Steady	3	▼1
Liberal Democratic Party	57,152	5.80	▼1.52	1	▼1	0	Steady	1	▼1
New People	55,901	5.67	New	1	New	0	New	1	New
A Just Russia — For Truth	22,108	2.24	▼3.45	0	▼1	0	▼1	0	▼2
Rodina	15,893	1.61	▼0.32	0	Steady	0	Steady	0	Steady
Invalid ballots	15,105	1.53	▼0.95	—	—	—	—	—	—
Total	985,542	100.00	—	28	Steady	28	Steady	56	Steady
Turnout	985,542	54.81	▲10.67	—	—	—	—	—	—
Registered voters	1,798,173	100.00	—	—	—	—	—	—	—

Former Head of Buturlinovsky District Yury Matuzov (United Russia) was elected as Chairman of the Oblast Duma, replacing Vladimir Netyosov (United Russia), who was appointed to the Federation Council instead of incumbent Senator Sergey Lukin (United Russia).

=== Results in single-member constituencies ===
==== District 1 ====
Summary of the 12–14 September 2025 Voronezh Oblast Duma election in District 1
Candidate	Party	Votes	%
Mikhail Gusev (incumbent)	United Russia	6,804	49.87%
Maksim Rogatnev	Communist Party	2,394	17.55%
Tatyana Gaponova	New People	2,381	17.45%
Andrey Pozhilykh	Rodina	1,187	8.70%
Total		13,643	100%

==== District 2 ====
Summary of the 12–14 September 2025 Voronezh Oblast Duma election in District 2
Candidate	Party	Votes	%
Vladimir Verzilin (incumbent)	United Russia	6,979	46.94%
Natalya Kravets	New People	2,630	17.69%
Aleksandr Solodkov	Communist Party	2,296	15.44%
Nina Zemlyanskaya	A Just Russia – For Truth	1,392	9.36%
Anatoly Kobyashev	Rodina	709	4.77%
Total		14,867	100%

==== District 3 ====
Summary of the 12–14 September 2025 Voronezh Oblast Duma election in District 3
Candidate	Party	Votes	%
Yevgeny Kitayev (incumbent)	United Russia	6,406	34.52%
Sergey Gurchenko	New People	6,265	33.76%
Vladislav Krutskikh	Communist Party	2,078	11.20%
Ivan Davydov	Liberal Democratic Party	1,163	6.27%
Vitaly Kashirin	A Just Russia – For Truth	906	4.88%
Igor Borisov	Rodina	837	4.51%
Total			100%

==== District 4 ====
Summary of the 12–14 September 2025 Voronezh Oblast Duma election in District 4
Candidate	Party	Votes	%
Denis Rubashchenko	United Russia	5,256	37.45%
Vladimir Rozhkov (incumbent)	Communist Party	4,197	29.90%
Pavel Pchelkin	Liberal Democratic Party	1,473	10.50%
Vasily Zhabin	A Just Russia – For Truth	1,081	7.70%
Denis Borisov	Rodina	978	6.97%
Total		14,035	100%

==== District 5 ====
Summary of the 12–14 September 2025 Voronezh Oblast Duma election in District 5
Candidate	Party	Votes	%
Aleksey Chernov (incumbent)	United Russia	4,196	33.85%
Pavel Korchagin	Communist Party	2,536	20.46%
Valeria Sokolovskaya	New People	2,048	16.52%
Igor Zenishchev	Liberal Democratic Party	1,497	12.08%
Dmitry Omorokov	A Just Russia – For Truth	666	5.37%
Vyacheslav Kostylev	Rodina	543	4.38%
Total		12,395	100%

==== District 6 ====
Summary of the 12–14 September 2025 Voronezh Oblast Duma election in District 6
Candidate	Party	Votes	%
Sergey Taldykin (incumbent)	United Russia	5,629	42.94%
Denis Kolomentsev	Communist Party	2,220	16.93%
Maria Yerofeyeva	New People	2,044	15.59%
Aleksandr Ovsyannikov	Liberal Democratic Party	1,373	10.47%
Sergey Sozhigayev	A Just Russia – For Truth	1,044	7.96%
Total		13,109	100%

==== District 7 ====
Summary of the 12–14 September 2025 Voronezh Oblast Duma election in District 7
Candidate	Party	Votes	%
Andrey Pakholchenko	United Russia	6,410	43.66%
Vyacheslav Kudrevatykh	Communist Party	2,555	17.40%
Anton Khodunov	New People	1,891	12.88%
Ilya Naumov	A Just Russia – For Truth	1,294	8.81%
Oleg Surkov	Liberal Democratic Party	1,258	8.57%
Vladimir Tarasov	Rodina	459	3.13%
Total		14,682	100%

==== District 8 ====
Summary of the 12–14 September 2025 Voronezh Oblast Duma election in District 8
Candidate	Party	Votes	%
Natalia Vozhova	United Russia	4,598	38.54%
Yelena Gubina (incumbent)	New People	3,572	29.94%
Yury Yakovlev	Liberal Democratic Party	1,731	14.51%
Artyom Cherkmarev	Rodina	991	8.31%
Total		11,930	100%

==== District 9 ====
Summary of the 12–14 September 2025 Voronezh Oblast Duma election in District 9
Candidate	Party	Votes	%
Aleksandr Vorontsov	United Russia	6,069	44.33%
Nikita Panov	New People	2,082	15.21%
Dmitry Lukin	Communist Party	1,920	14.03%
Natalya Voziyanova	Liberal Democratic Party	1,693	12.37%
Vladimir Tolubayev	A Just Russia – For Truth	1,000	7.31%
Total		13,689	100%

==== District 10 ====
Summary of the 12–14 September 2025 Voronezh Oblast Duma election in District 10
Candidate	Party	Votes	%
Ivan Moshurov (incumbent)	United Russia	7,418	54.05%
Yelena Grebenshchikova	New People	1,787	13.02%
Irina Volkova	Liberal Democratic Party	1,467	10.69%
Aleksandr Rubtsov	Rodina	1,234	8.99%
Andrey Titov	A Just Russia – For Truth	1,073	7.82%
Total		13,725	100%

==== District 11 ====
Summary of the 12–14 September 2025 Voronezh Oblast Duma election in District 11
Candidate	Party	Votes	%
Sergey Tirichenko	United Russia	3,438	27.73%
Yevgeny Kazmin	Communist Party	2,643	21.32%
Danil Navoyev	New People	1,774	14.31%
Dmitry Krutskikh	A Just Russia – For Truth	1,659	13.38%
Vadim Chasovskikh	Liberal Democratic Party	1,413	11.40%
Irina Prishchepova	Rodina	649	5.24%
Total		12,396	100%

==== District 12 ====
Summary of the 12–14 September 2025 Voronezh Oblast Duma election in District 12
Candidate	Party	Votes	%
Yury Smyshnikov	United Russia	5,036	36.76%
Nikolay Rudov	Communist Party	2,641	19.28%
Sergey Shishlakov	Rodina	1,608	11.74%
Gadzhi Amrakhov	Liberal Democratic Party	1,030	7.52%
Total		13,698	100%

==== District 13 ====
Summary of the 12–14 September 2025 Voronezh Oblast Duma election in District 13
Candidate	Party	Votes	%
Nikolay Netyaga	United Russia	43,068	74.48%
Yevgeny Chanchin	Communist Party	5,533	9.57%
Viktor Stepanov	Liberal Democratic Party	3,210	5.55%
Yekaterina Salikova	New People	2,198	3.80%
Maria Rymar	A Just Russia – For Truth	1,369	2.37%
Dmitry Khoroshunov	Rodina	1,241	2.15%
Total		57,827	100%

==== District 14 ====
Summary of the 12–14 September 2025 Voronezh Oblast Duma election in District 14
Candidate	Party	Votes	%
Vladimir Klyuchnikov (incumbent)	United Russia	34,000	69.28%
Aleksandr Shabunin	Communist Party	4,171	8.50%
Maksim Klepikov	Rodina	3,504	7.14%
Natalya Kuzmina	New People	2,528	5.15%
Bogdan Lozenko	Liberal Democratic Party	2,064	4.21%
Natalya Savenkova	A Just Russia – For Truth	1,779	3.62%
Total		49,079	100%

==== District 15 ====
Summary of the 12–14 September 2025 Voronezh Oblast Duma election in District 15
Candidate	Party	Votes	%
Aleksandr Solodov (incumbent)	United Russia	44,583	77.23%
Dmitry Yurkanov	Communist Party	4,507	7.81%
Artyom Zanin	Liberal Democratic Party	2,589	4.48%
Natalya Bocharova	New People	2,470	4.28%
Aleksey Podkopayev	A Just Russia – For Truth	1,595	2.76%
Sergey Aseyev	Rodina	1,324	2.29%
Total		57,726	100%

==== District 16 ====
Summary of the 12–14 September 2025 Voronezh Oblast Duma election in District 16
Candidate	Party	Votes	%
Ivan Vorobyev (incumbent)	United Russia	42,571	89.67%
Natalya Lapina	Communist Party	2,032	4.28%
Yelizaveta Polyanitsa	Liberal Democratic Party	1,307	2.75%
Kirill Reshetnyak	New People	815	1.72%
Aleksandr Myagkov	A Just Russia – For Truth	664	1.40%
Total		47,477	100%

==== District 17 ====
Summary of the 12–14 September 2025 Voronezh Oblast Duma election in District 17
Candidate	Party	Votes	%
Valery Nikitin	United Russia	48,206	90.37%
Sergey Kopiy	Communist Party	2,900	5.44%
Nadezhda Litvinova	A Just Russia – For Truth	1,109	2.08%
Nadezhda Repina	New People	1,021	1.91%
Total		53,341	100%

==== District 18 ====
Summary of the 12–14 September 2025 Voronezh Oblast Duma election in District 18
Candidate	Party	Votes	%
Sergey Sinyukov	United Russia	42,254	86.32%
Valentina Naumova	Communist Party	3,584	7.32%
Tatyana Shishkina	Liberal Democratic Party	941	1.92%
Mikhail Filippovich	Rodina	244	0.50%
Total		48,948	100%

==== District 19 ====
Summary of the 12–14 September 2025 Voronezh Oblast Duma election in District 19
Candidate	Party	Votes	%
Dmitry Shiryayev (incumbent)	United Russia	22,908	60.38%
Aleksandr Sukhinin	Communist Party	6,232	16.43%
Larisa Shnyak	Liberal Democratic Party	2,983	7.86%
Svetlana Bugayeva	Rodina	2,783	7.34%
Sergey Gulyayev	A Just Russia – For Truth	2,084	5.49%
Total		37,937	100%

==== District 20 ====
Summary of the 12–14 September 2025 Voronezh Oblast Duma election in District 20
Candidate	Party	Votes	%
Sergey Sazhin (incumbent)	United Russia	45,485	77.23%
Andrey Lukin	Communist Party	3,994	6.78%
Vladimir Tyukhin	New People	3,962	6.73%
Ivan Kroshka	Rodina	2,894	4.91%
Pavel Lazukin	Liberal Democratic Party	2,332	3.96%
Total		58,897	100%

==== District 21 ====
Summary of the 12–14 September 2025 Voronezh Oblast Duma election in District 21
Candidate	Party	Votes	%
Yury Matuzov	United Russia	53,921	94.63%
Oleg Dorozhkin	Communist Party	1,693	2.97%
Sergey Goldashov	New People	578	1.01%
Vladimir Safonov	A Just Russia – For Truth	355	0.62%
Konstantin Grachev	Rodina	301	0.53%
Total		56,979	100%

==== District 22 ====
Summary of the 12–14 September 2025 Voronezh Oblast Duma election in District 22
Candidate	Party	Votes	%
Roman Volodin	United Russia	48,429	85.66%
Aleksandr Bezzubtsev	Communist Party	2,601	4.60%
Svetlana Ogneva	Liberal Democratic Party	1,911	3.38%
Yelena Shapovalova	New People	1,324	2.34%
Nikolay Belousov	Rodina	1,105	1.95%
Lyudmila Moskaleva	A Just Russia – For Truth	918	1.62%
Total		56,534	100%

==== District 23 ====
Summary of the 12–14 September 2025 Voronezh Oblast Duma election in District 23
Candidate	Party	Votes	%
Artyom Kopylov	United Russia	43,072	84.26%
Pavel Shevchenko	Communist Party	3,622	7.09%
Tatyana Agoshkova	Rodina	2,442	4.78%
Yury Rublevsky	A Just Russia – For Truth	1,852	3.62%
Total		51,115	100%

==== District 24 ====
Summary of the 12–14 September 2025 Voronezh Oblast Duma election in District 24
Candidate	Party	Votes	%
Olga Ortina (incumbent)	United Russia	40,871	86.95%
Sergey Kulbakin	Liberal Democratic Party	2,125	4.52%
Konstantin Kornev	New People	1,344	2.86%
Svetlana Larina	A Just Russia – For Truth	1,292	2.75%
Dmitry Solomatin	Rodina	1,045	2.22%
Total		47,006	100%

==== District 25 ====
Summary of the 12–14 September 2025 Voronezh Oblast Duma election in District 25
Candidate	Party	Votes	%
Artyom Zubkov (incumbent)	United Russia	42,752	76.98%
Yelena Vysochina	Rodina	5,200	9.36%
Denis Roslik	Communist Party	3,928	7.07%
Roman Khartsyzov	A Just Russia – For Truth	3,055	5.50%
Total		55,538	100%

==== District 26 ====
Summary of the 12–14 September 2025 Voronezh Oblast Duma election in District 26
Candidate	Party	Votes	%
Sergey Tribunsky (incumbent)	United Russia	41,784	92.69%
Pyotr Dimitrov	Communist Party	1,469	3.26%
Aleksey Kortunov	New People	1,035	2.30%
Pavel Lutsenko	A Just Russia – For Truth	324	0.72%
Aleksey Klepikov	Rodina	230	0.51%
Total		45,080	100%

==== District 27 ====
Summary of the 12–14 September 2025 Voronezh Oblast Duma election in District 27
Candidate	Party	Votes	%
Nikolay Domnich (incumbent)	United Russia	22,656	61.51%
Sergey Tolstun	Communist Party	4,089	11.10%
Eduard Starikov	New People	2,958	8.03%
Aleksandr Zhavoronkov	Liberal Democratic Party	2,653	7.20%
Aleksandr Bogachev	Rodina	2,112	5.73%
Artyom Rymar	A Just Russia – For Truth	1,219	3.31%
Total		36,836	100%

==== District 28 ====
Summary of the 12–14 September 2025 Voronezh Oblast Duma election in District 28
Candidate	Party	Votes	%
Aleksandr Peshikov (incumbent)	United Russia	37,577	81.74%
Dmitry Parkhomenko	New People	2,891	6.29%
Yevgeny Tominov	Communist Party	2,111	4.59%
Olga Bondarenko	A Just Russia – For Truth	2,016	4.39%
Yevgeny Kuzub	Rodina	751	1.63%
Total		45,969	100%

=== Members ===
Incumbent deputies are highlighted with bold, elected members who declined to take a seat are marked with ~~strikethrough~~.

Constituency
No.	Member	Party
1	Mikhail Gusev	United Russia
2	Vladimir Verzilin	United Russia
3	Yevgeny Kitayev	United Russia
4	Denis Rubashchenko	United Russia
5	Aleksey Chernov	United Russia
6	Sergey Taldykin	United Russia
7	Andrey Pakholchenko	United Russia
8	Natalia Vozhova	United Russia
9	Aleksandr Vorontsov	United Russia
10	Ivan Moshurov	United Russia
11	Sergey Tirichenko	United Russia
12	Yury Smyshnikov	United Russia
13	Nikolay Netyaga	United Russia
14	Vladimir Klyuchnikov	United Russia
15	Aleksandr Solodov	United Russia
16	Ivan Vorobyev	United Russia
17	Valery Nikitin	United Russia
18	Sergey Sinyukov	United Russia
19	Dmitry Shiryayev	United Russia
20	Sergey Sazhin	United Russia
21	Yury Matuzov	United Russia
22	Roman Volodin	United Russia
23	Artyom Kopylov	United Russia
24	Olga Ortina	United Russia
25	Artyom Zubkov	United Russia
26	Sergey Tribunsky	United Russia
27	Nikolay Domnich	United Russia
28	Aleksandr Peshikov	United Russia

Party lists
Member	Party
~~Aleksandr Gusev~~	United Russia
Vladimir Netyosov	United Russia
Yury Yerakhovets	United Russia
Natalya Rachinskaya	United Russia
~~Vladimir Yevsyukov~~	United Russia
Vladislav Novomlinsky	United Russia
Konstantin Pilipenko	United Russia
~~Sergey Kovalyov~~	United Russia
~~Mikhail Zemskov~~	United Russia
~~Yury Sitnikov~~	United Russia
Dmitry Proskurin	United Russia
Mikhail Drapalyuk	United Russia
Aleksandr Knyazev	United Russia
Aleksandr Ilyin	United Russia
Viktor Logvinov	United Russia
Oleg Maslov	United Russia
Sergey Lukin	United Russia
Vyacheslav Kulikov	United Russia
Valentina Padina	United Russia
Oleg Nefedov	United Russia
Marina Andreychuk	United Russia
~~Sergey Storozhev~~	United Russia
Viktor Buzdalin	United Russia
Kirill Levit	United Russia
Valery Zarudny	United Russia
Lyudmila Ippolitova	United Russia
Sergey Potapov	United Russia
Valery Yaroshev	United Russia
Andrey Grishin	United Russia
Andrey Rogatnev	Communist Party
Denis Roslik	Communist Party
Oleg Spivak	Communist Party
~~Leonid Slutsky~~	Liberal Democratic Party
Natalya Voziyanova	Liberal Democratic Party
Sergey Gurchenko	New People

== See also ==
- 2025 Russian regional elections
