= Ivan Shabanov =

Russian politician (born 1939)

- Иван Шабанов
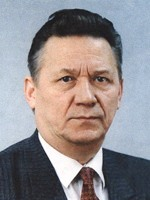

4th Governor of Voronezh Oblast
- In office 18 December 1996 – 29 December 2000
- Preceded by: Aleksandr Tsapin
- Succeeded by: Vladimir Kulakov

1st Chairman of the Voronezh Oblast Duma
- In office April 1994 – 18 December 1996
- Succeeded by: Anatoly Goliyusov

First Secretary of the Voronezh Regional Committee of the CPSU
- In office 7 June 1990 – 23 August 1991
- Preceded by: Gennady Kabasin

Personal details
- Born: Ivan Mikhaylovich Shabanov; 18 October 1939 (age 86) Nizhnyaya Baygora, Verkhnekhavsky District, Voronezh Oblast, Russian SFSR, Soviet Union

Ivan Mikhaylovich Shabanov (Russian: Иван Михайлович Шабанов; born 18 October 1939) is a Russian politician, who was the governor of Voronezh Oblast from 1996 to 2000. He is currently the advisor to the chairman of the board of directors of Agrokhimsoyuz since February 2001.

== Biography ==
Ivan Shabanov was born in Nizhnyaya Baygora on 18 October 1939. He is Russian by nationality. His mother died when he was two years old, while his father, Mikhail, worked in Ukraine.

=== Education and work ===
Shababnov began his career in 1955, as a trailer operator on a collective farm. He had completed military service in the Soviet Army.

He graduated from the Usman Agricultural College, at the Voronezh Agricultural Institute in 1964.

In 1965, he was a teacher at the Usman Agricultural College (Lipetsk Oblast). In 1966, he was the Secretary of the Komsomol Committee of the Voronezh Agricultural Institute, then head of the department of the Voronezh Regional Committee of the Komsomol.

=== Political activity ===
Since 1970, he was the instructor, the deputy head of the department of the Voronezh regional committee of the CPSU.

He graduated from the Academy of Social Sciences under the Central Committee of the CPSU in 1976, and was the candidate of historical sciences.

In 1976, he was the second, then the first secretary of the Kantemirovsky district committee of the CPSU of the Voronezh Oblast, and in 1979, he became the head of the propaganda and agitation department of the Voronezh regional committee of the CPSU.

From 1982 to 1988, he was the Deputy Chairman, and then Chairman of the Executive Committee of the Voronezh Regional Council. In 1990, he was elected a deputy, and in April 1990, he became the chairman of the Voronezh Regional Council.

On 7 June 1990, he was elected First Secretary of the Voronezh Regional Committee of the CPSU. From 1990 to 1991, he was a member of the Central Committee of the CPSU.

In December 1993, Shabanov ran for the Federation Council of the first convocation, but was not elected. In March 1994, he was elected a deputy, and in April, he became the 1st chairman of the Voronezh Oblast Duma.

On 8 December 1996, with the support of the NPSR and the Communist Party of the Russian Federation, Shabanov was elected governor of the Voronezh Oblast, receiving 49% of the vote (with a turnout of 52%), defeating the incumbent acting governor Aleksandr Tsapin, who received 41% of the votes.

From January 1996 to January 2001, he was a member of the Federation Council, and was the deputy chairman, then promoted to chairman of the Committee on Security and Defense Issues in March 2000, and was a member of the Commission on Rules and Parliamentary Procedures, and then a member of the Credentials Committee.

In the next gubernatorial elections, on 24 December 2000, he received 15% of the votes cast, and lost the election to the head of the regional department of the Federal Security Service, Vladimir Kulakov, who won with 60% of the votes.
