= Aleksandr Tsapin =

Russian politician (born 1949)

- Александр Цапин
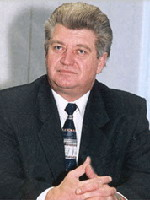

3rd Governor of Voronezh Oblast
- In office 24 September 1996 – 18 December 1996
- Preceded by: Aleksandr Kovalyov
- Succeeded by: Ivan Shabanov

Head of Voronezh
- In office February 1995 – October 2000
- Preceded by: Anatoly Golts
- Succeeded by: Aleksandr Kovalyov

Chairman of the City Council of People's Deputies of Voronezh
- In office 1991–1993

Chairman of the Voronezh City Executive Committee
- In office 1990–1991
- Succeeded by: Aleksandr Kovalyov

Personal details
- Born: Aleksandr Nikolayevich Tsapin; 29 May 1949 (age 77) Galiyevka, Russian SFSR, Soviet Union.
- Children: 2 daughters

Aleksandr Nikolayevich Tsapin (Russian: Александр Николаевич Цапин; born 29 May 1949) is a Russian statesman, who served as the governor of Voronezh Oblast in 1996.

== Biography ==
Aleksandr Tsapin was born on 29 May 1949.

In 1972, he graduated from the Voronezh Polytechnic Institute with a degree in Automation and Telemechanics.

Until 1979, he worked in engineering and managerial positions at NPO Elektronika, in Voronezh.

Since 1979, he was in the representative bodies of regional power and local self-government: he was the deputy chairman of the executive committee of the Zheleznodorozhny District Council of People's Deputies in Voronezh, chairman of the executive committee of the Leninsky District Council of People's Deputies.

Since 1986 Deputy, then First Deputy, and in 1990, Tsapin became the Chairman of the Voronezh City Executive Committee.

In 1992, Tsapin became the head of the administration of the city of Voronezh, at the same time since 1994, he heads the municipal council of the city of Voronezh.

In 1995, he had a course of study at the Academy of National Economy under the Government of the Russian Federation, which qualifies him as "Manager of the highest category".

On 24 September 1996, Tsapin was appointed Governor (Head) of the Voronezh Oblast. On 8 December 1996, after losing the election to Ivan Shabanov, he again headed the Voronezh Municipal Council, as a member of the Federation Council through 8 October to 25 December 1996.

In 1997, Tsapin was elected mayor of Voronezh.

From 2001 to April 2009, Tsapin was Deputy Governor of the Voronezh Oblast, which he had overseen the issues of energy, gas supply, construction, architecture, housing and communal services, road facilities.

He is also a member of the Council of Heads of Local Self-Government Bodies under the Russian government, a member of the Board of the Union of Russian Cities, Vice President of the Association of Cities in the South of Russia, a member of the Presidium of the Congress of Municipal Formations of the Russia.
