= Sergey Lukin =

Sergey Lukin may refer to:

- Sergey Lukin (politician) (born 1954), Russian politician
- Sergey Lukin (runner) (born 1975), Russian middle-distance and long-distance runner
