= Nikolay Olshansky =

Russian politician (born 1939)

- Николай Ольшанский
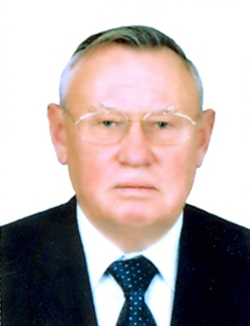
- Olshanksy in 2011

Senator from Voronezh Oblast
- In office 20 January 2011 – 1 March 2013
- Preceded by: Konstantin Yeryomenko
- Succeeded by: Sergey Lukin

Personal details
- Born: Nikolay Mikhailovich Olshansky; 19 April 1939 (age 87) Drabiv, Drabiv Raion, Cherkasy Oblast, Ukrainian SSR, Soviet Union
- Education: Lviv Polytechnic

Nikolay Mikhailovich Olshansky (Russian: Николай Михайлович Ольшанский; born 19 April 1939) is a Russian politician who served as a senator from Voronezh Oblast from 2011 to 2013.

== Biography ==
He was born on April 9, 1939 in the village of Drabovo in Ukraine. He graduated from Lviv Polytechnic Institute in 1960, and from the Academy of Social Sciences under the Central Committee of the Communist Party of the Soviet Union in 1979.

== Career ==
Nikolay Olshansky was born in Drabiv Raion, Ukrainian Soviet Socialist Republic. From 1960 to 1973, he worked at the Sumy Regenerator Plant. From 1980 to 1981, he served in Afghanistan. From 1986 to 1989, he was the Minister for the production of mineral fertilizers of the USSR. In December 1999, Olshansky was elected to the State Duma for the three convocations in a raw. From 2011 to 2013, he represented Voronezh Oblast in the Federation Council.
