= Peter Kuchment =

American mathematician

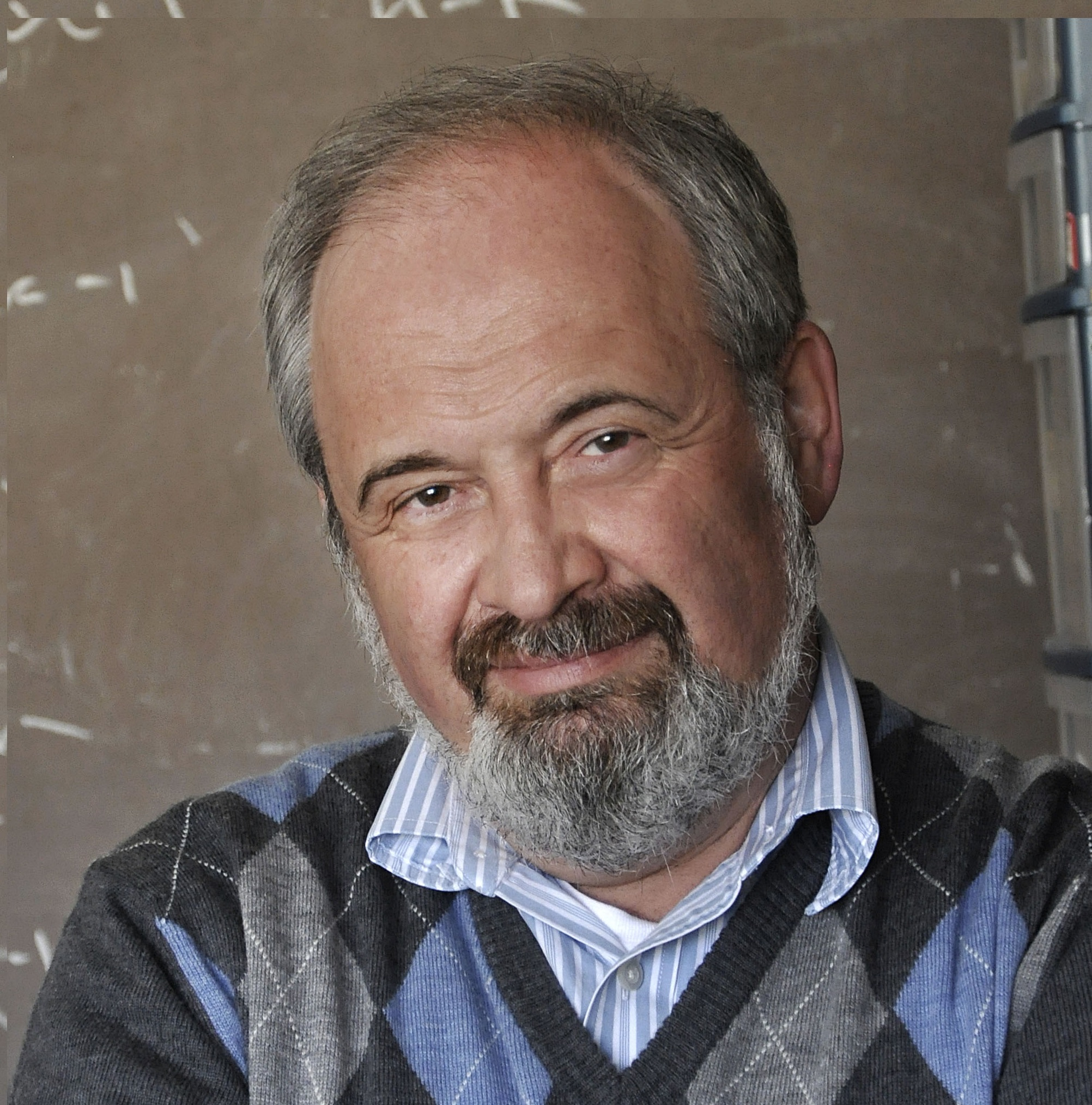
- Born: Petr Abramovich Kuchment; 1949 (age 76–77); Chernivtsi, Ukraine
- Education: Voronezh State University, USSR
- Known for: Floquet theory for periodic PDEs, mathematical techniques of medical imaging (tomography), quantum graphs, K-12 outreach
- Scientific career
- Fields: PDEs, Operator theory, Computed tomography, Applied mathematics
- Workplaces: Voronezh Forestry Institute, USSR; Wichita State University, KS; Texas A&M University, TX.
- Thesis: PhD Thesis (1973): Topological problems of operator theory. D.Sci. Thesis (1983): Floquet theory for PDEs
- Doctoral advisor: Ph.D Advisor Selim Krein

Peter Kuchment (born 1949) is an American mathematician working in partial differential equations, mathematical physics, geometric analysis, and integral geometry with applications to medical imaging.

Peter Kuchment was born in 1949 in Chernivtsi (formerly Chernovtsy), Soviet Union (now Ukraine). He then studied at a university and worked in Voronezh (Russia), until emigrating to the US in 1989. He holds a M.S. in mathematics from Voronezh State University (1971), a Ph.D. from Kharkiv State University, Ukraine (1973), and Doctor of Science from The Institute of Mathematics of the Ukrainian Acad. Sci., Kyiv (1983) (the latter two degrees in Mathematics and Physics).

== Employment ==
- 1971–1972: School teacher of mathematics, Voronezh, USSR
- 1972–1989: Faculty (Assistant, Associate, Full Professor and chair) at the Mathematics and Theoretical Mechanics Department of Voronezh Forestry Institute (now Voronezh State University of Forestry and Technology).
- 1990–2001: Associate and later Full Professor at the Mathematics and Statistics Department of Wichita State University.
- 2001–present: Full Professor, later Distinguished Professor (2011), Arthur George and Mary Emolene Owen Chair (2025) of the Mathematics Department at the Texas A&M University.

== Publications ==
Kuchment has published 168 peer-reviewed papers. He has four books published and one translated.

== Advising ==
Kuchment advised on 21 PhD theses.

== Professional honors ==
P. Kuchment is a member of:

- American Association for the Advancement of Science (Fellow)
- American Mathematical Society (Fellow, Life Member)
- American Physical Society (Fellow, Life Member)
- Institute of Physics (Fellow)
- Inst. Electr. Electron. Eng. (Senior Member)
- Society for Industrial and Applied Mathematics (Fellow)
- Asia-Pacific Artificial Intelligence Association (Fellow)
