= Aleksandr Kovalyov (politician) =

Russian politician (1942–2024)

- Александр Ковалёв
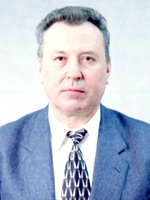

2nd Mayor of Voronezh
- In office October 2000 – 4 November 2003
- Preceded by: Aleksandr Tsapin
- Succeeded by: Boris Skrynnikov

2nd Governor of Voronezh Oblast
- In office 8 March 1992 – 17 September 1996
- Preceded by: Viktor Kalasnikov
- Succeeded by: Aleksandr Tsapin (acting)

Chairman of the Voronezh City Executive Committee
- In office 29 August 1991 – 1992

Personal details
- Born: Aleksandr Yakoblyevich Kovalyov; 13 September 1942 Vorobyovka, Voronezh Oblast, Russian SFSR, USSR
- Died: 7 April 2024 (aged 81)

Aleksandr Yakovlevich Kovalyov (Russian: Александр Яковлевич Ковалёв; 13 September 1942 – 7 April 2024) was a Russian politician who last served as the 2nd Head of Voronezh from 2000 to 2003. Kovalyov also served as the 2nd Governor of Voronezh Oblast from 1992 to 1996.

Throughout the entire period of Kovalyov's rule, the region had the lowest crime rate in the country.

== Biography ==
Aleksandr Kovalyov was born in Vorobyovka on 13 September 1942.

Kovalyov graduated from the Voronezh Technical School of Railway Transport in 1960, and the Voronezh Polytechnic Institute with a degree in Organization of Production in 1964.

From 1964, he worked in Voronezh as a locomotive driver at a defense industry plant. From 1966 to 1972, he was a foreman, a senior foreman at the plant of heavy excavators. The Comintern; from 1972 to 1977, he was promoted to senior foreman of the diesel locomotive repair plant. Dzerzhinsky; From 1977 to 1980, he was foreman of a section, process engineer, design engineer, head of the supply department, then promoted to senior foreman of mechanical plant No. 6 in the city of Voronezh. In 1980, he was a senior dispatcher engineer at the Voronezh production association of press-forging equipment named after V.I. Kalinin. From 1980 to 1987, he was the deputy head of the shop, head of the department of material and technical supply of the production association for the production of heavy excavators. Comintern. From 1987, he was Deputy General Director, and from 1988 to 1991, he was promoted to General Director of the Voronezhtyazhtekhpress production association for the production of heavy mechanical presses.

Kovalyov was elected as People's Deputy of the Russian Federation and Deputy of the Voronezh City Council.

Kovalyov was a member of the CPSU until 1991.

In August 1991, Kovalyov was elected Chairman of the Executive Committee of the Voronezh City Council of People's Deputies. On 10 April 1992, President Boris Yeltsin appointed Kovalyov as Governor (Head) of the Voronezh Oblast, and he held this position until September 1996. During the period when he held this post, he was called the governor of the Voronezh Oblast since 1993.

On 12 December 1993, Kovalyov was elected to the Federation Council. Since January 1996, he was a member of the Federation Council by office, and was a member of the Federation Council Committee on Federation Affairs, the Federal Treaty and Regional Policy, and a member of the Federation Council's Credentials Committee.

On 28 September 1996, he was appointed Plenipotentiary Representative in the Republic of North Ossetia-Alania and in Ingushetia.

From 1999 to 2000, he was part of the Trade Representative of Russia in Ukraine.

On 24 December 2000, Kovalyov was elected mayor of Voronezh, gaining 43% of the votes cast, ahead of the former mayor and acting successor as governor, Aleksandr Tsapin, who is currently retired.

In 2002 he was awarded the title of "Honorary Citizen of the City of Voronezh".

On 4 November 2003, he resigned ahead of schedule without giving any reasons.

Kovalyov died on 7 April 2024, at the age of 81.
