= Viktor Kalashnikov (politician) =

Russian politician (1940–2023)

- Виктор Калашников

1st Head of Voronezh Oblast Administration
- In office 16 October 1991 – 18 March 1992
- Succeeded by: Aleksandr Kovalyov

Chairman of the Voronezh Regional Executive Committee
- In office August 1990 – December 1990
- Preceded by: Ivan Ivlyev

Personal details
- Born: 8 March 1940 Novozhiznenskoye, Gorodishchensky District, Stalingrad Oblast, Russian SFSR, USSR
- Died: 1 December 2023 (aged 83)
- Education: Novocherkassk Polytechnic Institute

Viktor Kirillovich Kalashnikov (Russian: Виктор Кириллович Калашников; 8 March 1940 – 1 December 2023) was a Russian politician who was the Governor of Voronezh Oblast, from 16 October 1991 to 18 March 1992, and the Chairman of the Voronezh Regional Executive Committee from August 1990 to December 1990. He worked at the Voronezh mining equipment plant, now "Rudgormash", where he rose to the position of general director.

Kalashnikov became the first Head of Administration in post-Soviet Russia to be sacked by Boris Yeltsin after only five months in office. The president dismissed him for "serious violations committed in the distribution of passenger cars intended for the suppliers of grain and agricultural products, as well as the use of his official position for personal gain." In 1991, the Government of Russia ordered the distribution of cars among peasants, trying to somehow interest them in their work due to the critical situation with the provision of food. As cars were not yet freely sold at that time, reselling performed by the Kalashnikov administration was considered illegal.

Kalashnikov died on 1 December 2023, at the age of 83.
