= Viktor Kalashnikov =

Viktor Kalashnikov may refer to:

- Viktor Kalashnikov (journalist), Russian journalist and former KGB officer
- Viktor Kalashnikov (politician), Russian politician
- Victor Kalashnikov, Russian small arms designer
