= List of chairmen of the Voronezh Oblast Duma =

The chairman of the Voronezh Oblast Duma is the presiding officer of that legislature.

== Office-holders ==
- Ivan Shabanov 1994–1997
- Anataoly Goliusov 1997–2001
- Alexey Nakvasin 2001–2005
- Yury Titov 2005
- Vladimir Klyuchnikov 2005-incumbent
