= Galiyevka =

Galiyevka Галиевка
- Khutor
- Location within Voronezh Oblast Location within Russia
- Coordinates: 49°58′N 40°37′E
- Country: Russia
- Region: Voronezh Oblast
- District: Bogucharsky District
- Time zone: UTC+3:00

Galiyevka (Russian: Галиевка) is a rural locality (a khutor) in Zalimanskoye Rural Settlement, Bogucharsky District, Voronezh Oblast, Russia. The population was 603 as of 2010. There are 9 streets.

== Geography ==
Galiyevka is located 7 km northeast of Boguchar (the district's administrative centre) by road. Zaliman is the nearest rural locality.
