= Governor of Voronezh Oblast =

Highest-ranking official in Voronezh Oblast, Russia

- Coat of arms of Voronezh Oblast

- Incumbent; Aleksandr Gusev since 15 September 2018
- Residence: Voronezh
- Term length: 5 years, one reelection possible
- Constituting instrument: Charter of Voronezh Oblast, Article 26
- Inaugural holder: Viktor Kalashnikov
- Formation: 1991
- Website: www.govvrn.ru

The governor of Voronezh Oblast (Russian: Губернатор Воронежской области) is the highest official of Voronezh Oblast, a federal subject of Russia. The governor heads the executive branch in the region.

== History of office ==
Until 2006, the head of the regional administration was the highest official in Voronezh Oblast. From 1996 to 2005, the governor was elected by the residents of Voronezh Oblast. From 2005 to 2012, elections were abolished and governor was appointed by the Voronezh Oblast Duma on the proposal of the President of Russia.

== List of officeholders ==
No.	Portrait	Governor	Tenure	Time in office	Party	Election
1		Viktor Kalashnikov (1940–2023)	16 October 1991 – 18 March 1992 (removed)	154 days	Independent	Appointed
—		Aleksandr Solovyov (born 1949)	18 March 1992 – 10 April 1992 (successor took office)	23 days	Independent	Acting
2		Aleksandr Kovalyov (1942–2024)	10 April 1992 – 17 September 1996 (resigned)	4 years, 160 days	Independent	Appointed
—		Gennady Makin (born 1957)	17 September 1996 – 24 September 1996 (successor took office)	7 days	Independent	Acting (Note: There is at least one executive order signed by Makin as first deputy governor during the September 1996 vacancy. He did not formally use the title of acting governor.)
3		Aleksandr Tsapin (born 1949)	24 September 1996 – 18 December 1996 (lost election)	85 days	Independent	Appointed
4		Ivan Shabanov (born 1939)	18 December 1996 – 29 December 2000 (lost re-election)	4 years, 11 days	Communist	1996
5		Vladimir Kulakov (born 1944)	29 December 2000 – 12 March 2009 (term end)	8 years, 73 days	Independent → United Russia	2000; 2004
6		Alexey Gordeyev (born 1955)	12 March 2009 – 7 March 2014 (term end)	8 years, 288 days	United Russia	2009 (Note: Appointed by the president of Russia with the consent of the Voronezh Oblast Duma.)
—		Alexey Gordeyev (born 1955)	7 March 2014 – 20 September 2014	8 years, 288 days	United Russia	Acting
(6)		Alexey Gordeyev (born 1955)	20 September 2014 – 25 December 2017 (resigned)	8 years, 288 days	United Russia	2014
—		Aleksandr Gusev (born 1963)	25 December 2017 – 15 September 2018	8 years, 287 days	United Russia	Acting
7		Aleksandr Gusev (born 1963)	15 September 2018 – present	8 years, 287 days	United Russia	2018; 2023
