= Nizhnyaya Baygora =

Nizhnyaya Baygora Нижняя Байгора
- Selo
- Location within Voronezh Oblast Location within Russia
- Coordinates: 51°56′N 39°55′E
- Country: Russia
- Region: Voronezh Oblast
- District: Verkhnekhavsky District
- Time zone: UTC+3:00

Nizhnyaya Baygora (Russian: Нижняя Байгора) is a rural locality (a selo) and the administrative center of Nizhnebaygorskoye Rural Settlement, Verkhnekhavsky District, Voronezh Oblast, Russia. The population was 575 as of 2010. There are 11 streets.

== Geography ==
Nizhnyaya Baygora is located 14 km north of Verkhnyaya Khava (the district's administrative centre) by road. Verkhnyaya Baygora is the nearest rural locality.
