= Yevgeny Revenko =

Russian politician

- Евгений Ревенко
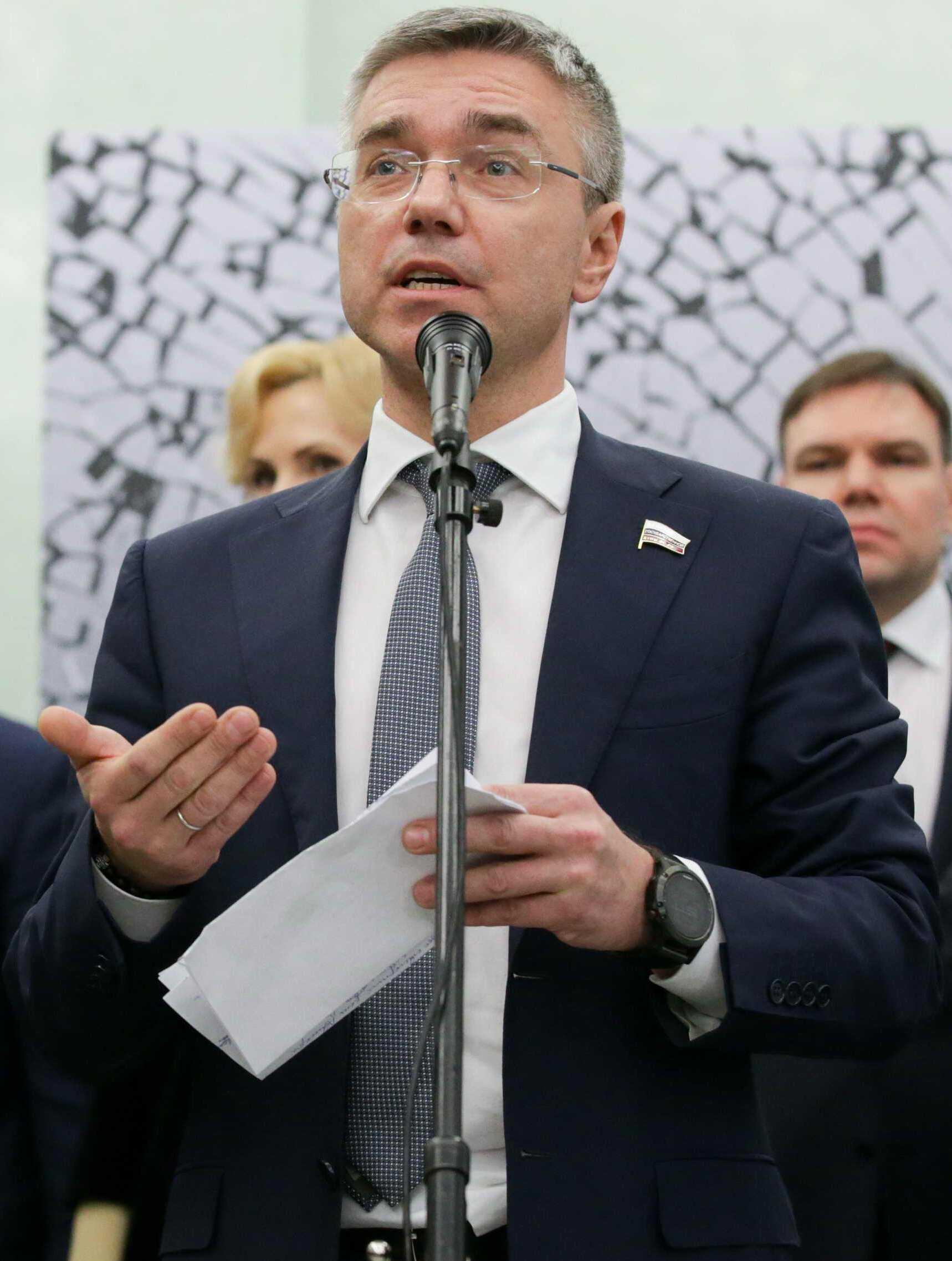

Member of the State Duma
- Incumbent
- Assumed office 5 October 2016

Personal details
- Born: 22 May 1972 (age 54) Sovetskiy, Novosibirsk Oblast, Russian SFSR, Soviet Union
- Party: United Russia
- Education: Lviv Higher Military-Political School; Moscow State University
- Awards: Order of Friendship; Medal of the Order "For Merit to the Fatherland"; Medal "For the Return of Crimea"

Evgeny Vasilievich Revenko (Russian: Евгений Васильевич Ревенко; born May 22, 1972, Sovetskiy, Kupinsky District) is a Russian politician, who has served as a Member of the State Duma since 2021. Prior to his political career, Revenko was a journalist.

== Biography ==
In 1991, Revenko started working as a freelancer of the All-Union radio station "Youth". He left the position in 1995 to work for the VIDgital. From 1996 to 2000, he was a correspondent at the NTV. From 1996 to 1997, Revenko covered the First Chechen War, and in 1999, he prepared documentaries on the NATO bombing of Yugoslavia. At the beginning of the 2000s, he worked at the Russia-1 TV channel.

From 2005 to 2007, he served as Deputy Director of the Department of Mass Communications, Culture and Education of the Government of Russia. From 2012 to 2016, he was the Deputy General Director of the All-Russia State Television and Radio Broadcasting Company.

In 2016, he was elected to the 7th convocation of the State Duma, and was re-elected in 2021 and 2026 to the 8th and 9th convocations respectively.

Revenko has been criticised for his rather emotional and often reportedly fake coverage of various geopolitcial events, particularly those related to Ukrainian politics. Since Russia invaded Ukraine in 2022, the United Kingdom, United States, European Union, Japan, Ukraine, New Zealand, Australia and Switzerland placed Revenko on their lists of sanctioned individuals.
