= Sergey Lukin (politician) =

Russian politician (born 1954)

Sergei Lukin
- Сергей Лукин
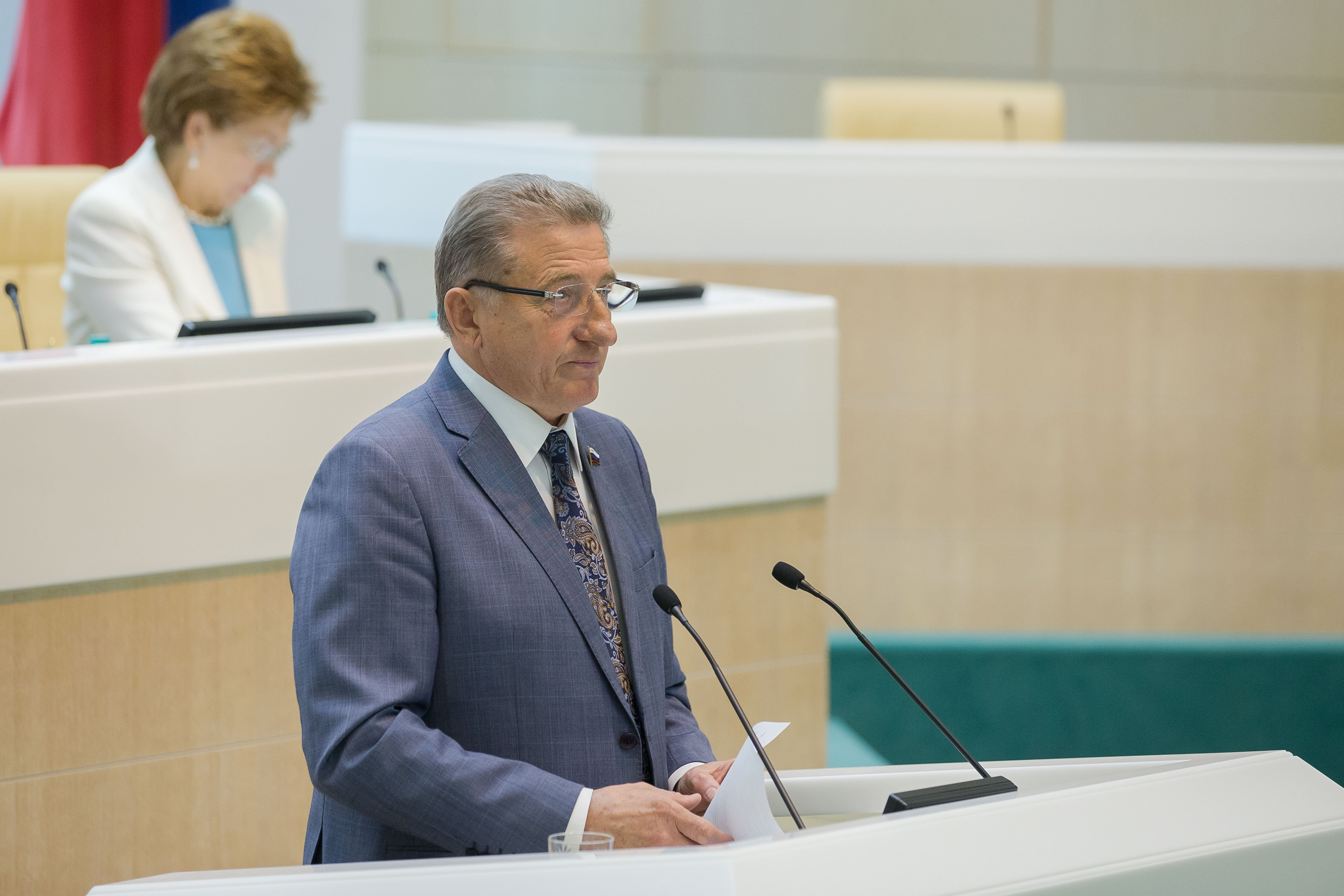
- Lukin in 2016

Senator from Voronezh Oblast
- Incumbent
- Assumed office 24 September 2020
- Preceded by: Nikolay Olshansky

Personal details
- Born: Sergei Lukin; 7 July 1954 (age 72) Perlyovka, Semiluksky District, Voronezh Oblast, Soviet Union
- Party: United Russia
- Education: Voronezh State University of Architecture and Civil Engineering

Sergei Nikolayevich Lukin (Russian: Сергей Николаевич Лукин; born 7 July 1954) is a Russian politician serving as a senator from Voronezh Oblast since 24 September 2020.

== Career ==
Sergei Lukin was born on 7 July 1954 in Perlyovka, Semiluksky District, Voronezh Oblast. In 1976, he graduated from the Voronezh State University of Architecture and Civil Engineering. From 1979 to 2012, he worked at the House-building plant (DSK) in Voronezh. From 2001 to 2013, Lukin was the deputy of the Voronezh Oblast Duma. In April 2013, he was elected senator from Voronezh Oblast. In 2020, he was re-appointed for the same position.

== Sanctions ==
Sergei Lukin is under personal sanctions introduced by the European Union, the United Kingdom, the USA, Canada, Switzerland, Australia, Ukraine, New Zealand, for ratifying the decisions of the "Treaty of Friendship, Cooperation and Mutual Assistance between the Russian Federation and the Donetsk People's Republic and between the Russian Federation and the Luhansk People's Republic" and providing political and economic support for Russia's annexation of Ukrainian territories.
