= Posyolok Oblastnoy selskokhozyaystvennoy opytnoy stantsii =

Posyolok Oblastnoy selskokhozyaystvennoy opytnoy stantsii Посёлок Областной сельскохозяйственной опытной станции
- Settlement
- Location within Volgograd Oblast Location within Russia
- Coordinates: 48°52′N 44°23′E
- Country: Russia
- Region: Volgograd Oblast
- District: Gorodishchensky District
- Time zone: UTC+4:00

Posyolok Oblastnoy selskokhozyaystvennoy opytnoy stantsii (Russian: Посёлок Областной сельскохозяйственной опытной станции) is a rural locality (a settlement) and the administrative center of Novozhiznenskoye Rural Settlement, Gorodishchensky District, Volgograd Oblast, Russia. The population was 1,904 as of 2010. There are 30 streets.

== Geography ==
The settlement is located in steppe, 38 km northwest of Gorodishche (the district's administrative centre) by road. Kuzmichi is the nearest rural locality.
