= Voronezh State Pedagogical University =

University in Voronezh

- Федеральное государственное бюджетное образовательное учреждение высшего образования «Воронежский государственный педагогический университет»
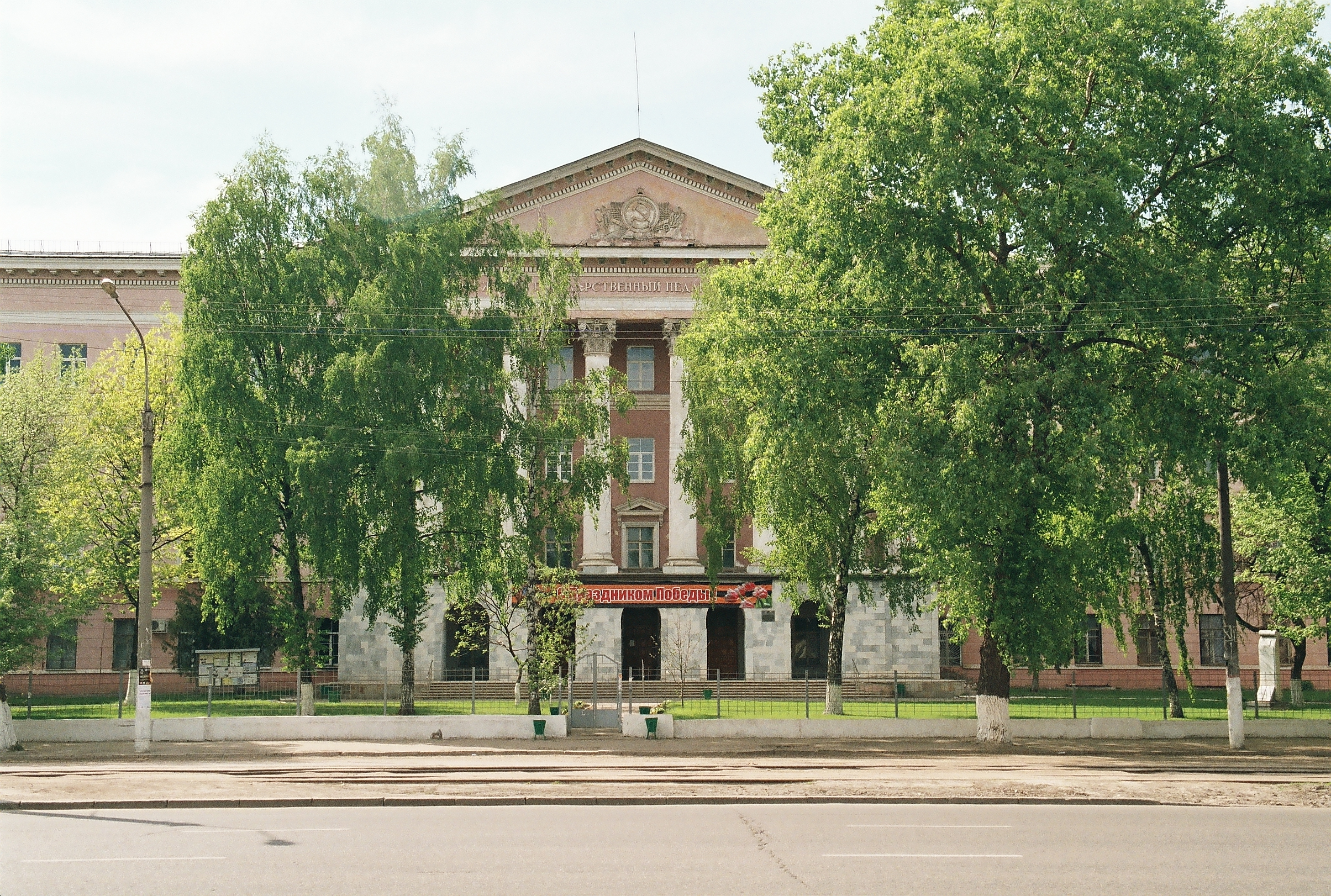
- Type: public
- Established: 1931
- Rector: Sergey Filonenko
- Students: 6,000
- Location: Voronezh, Russia; 51.6866°N 39.2165°E
- Campus: urban
- Language: Russian
- Website: http://www.vspu.ac.ru/

Voronezh State Pedagogical University (Russian: Воронежский государственный педагогический университет) is a public university located in Voronezh, Russia.

== History ==
Formed in 1931 as Voronezh Agrarian Pedagogical Institute. A year later, the institute was named after the Soviet historian - Marxist Pokrovsky M.N., distance learning was opened. In 1941, because of the war, the staff of the institute was evacuated to the city of Urzhum, Kirov Region, and in 1944 they were returned.

In 1981, the institute was awarded the Order of the Badge of Honor for success in the education of personnel. In 1993 the institute was given the title of university.
