= Voronezh State University of Engineering Technology =

- Воронежский государственный университет инженерных технологий
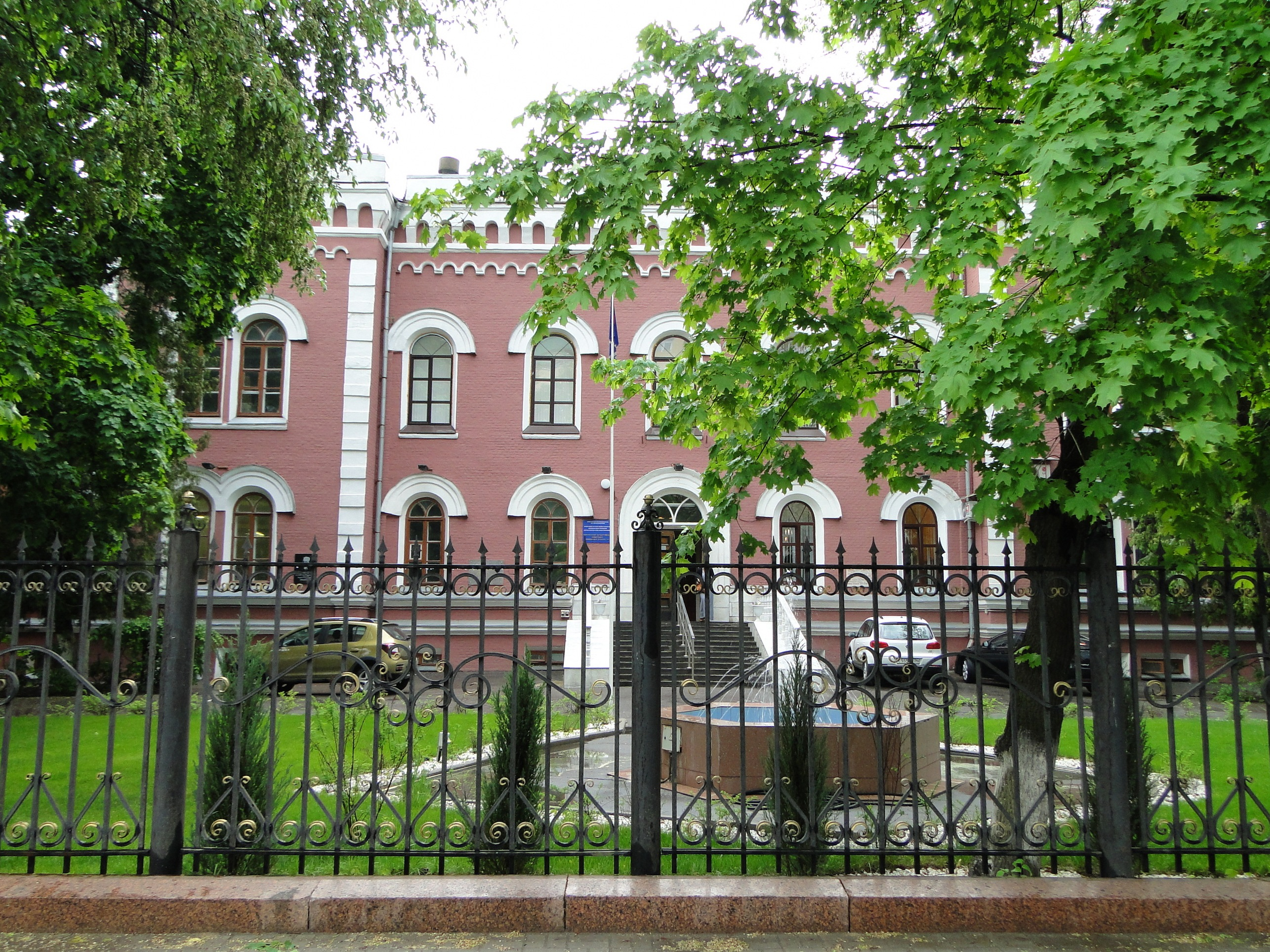
- Type: public
- Established: 1930
- Location: Voronezh, Russia; 51°40′32″N 39°12′48″E
- Campus: urban
- Language: Russian

Voronezh State University of Engineering Technology (Russian: Воронежский государственный университет инженерных технологий) is a public university located in Voronezh, Russia. It was founded in 1930.

== History ==
University was founded June 3, 1930, when the technological faculty of the Voronezh Agricultural Institute was transformed into the Voronezh Institute of Food Industry Commissariat of Trade of the RSFSR. The new institute had three departments - mechanical, technological, planning and economic. The task of the new institute was to train engineers for starch, sugar, fermentation and alcohol industries. In 1931 four faculties were established: sugar, starch and syrup, fermentation and distillery. As of December 1931 there were 712 students studying at the institute.

In 1932 the institute was renamed to Voronezh Chemical and Technological Institute.

During the Second World War the institute was partially bombed by the German aviation. Emergency evacuation of the institute was carried out in 1942, it was moved to the city of Biysk, Altai Territory. The institute was housed in the settlement of the local sugar factory. In 1944 the institute returned to Voronezh, restoration of academic buildings continued until the early 1950s.

In 1950 the institute was affiliated with the Leningrad Technological Institute of Food Industry (LTIPP), but in 1959 it returned to Voronezh by the decision of the USSR Council of Ministers. The institute was now called Voronezh Technological Institute. The number of faculties was increased from two to six, the number of departments was increased from 20 to 32. The number of students was increased from 1300 to 5000, and professors from 110 to 300. By 1965 the number of teachers increased to 435.

In 1994 the institute was renamed as Voronezh State Technological Academy. In 1995, the Faculty of Humanitarian Education and Upbringing began to work. In 1998 the departments of labor organization and marketing activity, applied mathematics and economic-mathematical methods were created.

In 2011 the academy was renamed to Voronezh State University of Engineering Technologies.

In 2018 on the basis of the Russian-Chinese center of VSUIT the Association of Chinese students of the Voronezh region was created.

== Structure ==
- Faculty of Management and Informatics in Technological Systems
- Faculty of Food Machines and Devices
- Faculty of Ecology and Chemical Technology
- Faculty of Technology
- Faculty of Economics and Management
- Faculty of Technology
- Faculty of Continuing Education
- Faculty of Secondary Vocational Education
- Faculty of Humanities Education and Training
- Pre-university training faculty
