= Voronezh State University of Forestry and Technologies =

University in Voronezh, Russia

Voronezh State Forestry University named after G.F. Morozov
- Воронежский государственный лесотехнический университет им. Г.ф. Морозова
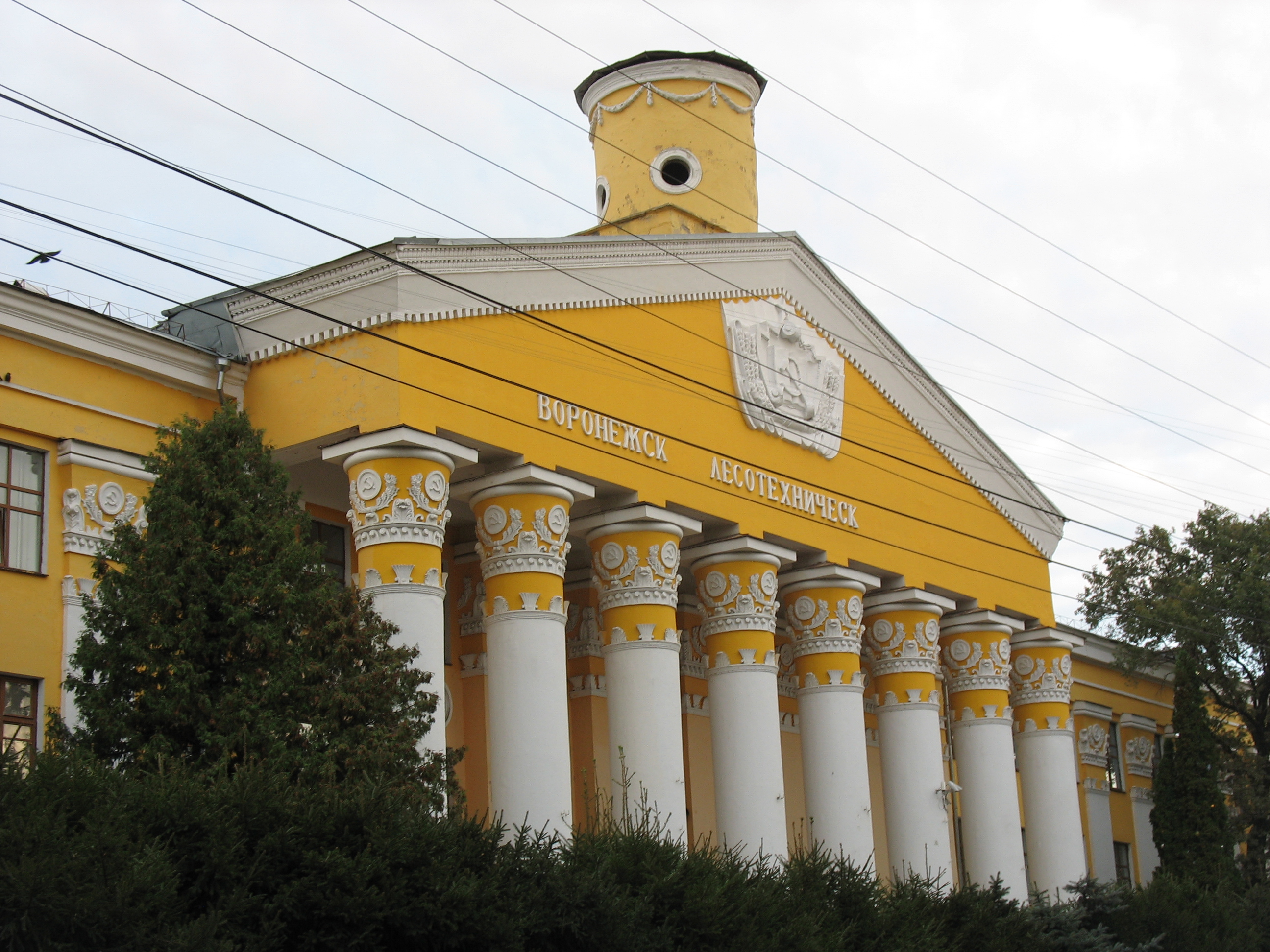
- The main building's facade UGLTU
- Type: Public
- Established: 1930
- Rector: Drapalyuk Mikhail Valentinovich (acting)
- Students: 5,000
- Location: Voronezh, Russia; 51°43′07″N 39°13′17″E
- Website: www.vgltu.ru

University rankings

Regional – Overall
- QS Emerging Europe and Central Asia: 351-400 (2022)

Voronezh State University of Forestry and Technologies is a university in Voronezh, Russia

== History ==
In 1918, a forestry department was opened as part of Voronezh Agricultural Institute. In 1923, it was reorganized into a Forestry Faculty. In 1930, Voronezh Agricultural Institute was divided into several institutes and Voronezh Institute of Forestry Engineering was established on the basis of the Forestry Faculty.

The university changed its name several times: Forestry Institute (1930–1931), Institute of Forestry (1932–1935), Silvicultural Institute (1936–1937), Forestry Institute (1938–1955), Forestry Ingineering Institute (1956–1980), Forestry Institute of the order of Friendship of Peoples (1980–1994), Academy of Forestry Engineering (1994–2015), Voronezh State University of Forestry and Technologies named after G. F. Morozov (2015).

In 1952-1953 the Institute's arboretum was established at the field site opposite the main building covering an area of 3.5 hectares. This work was done by the students and professors. One of the founders of the arboretum was E. N. Naumenko.

In 1980 the university celebrated its 50th anniversary, after which it was awarded the order of Friendship of Peoples.

== Rectors ==
- Tyurin A. V. 1930
- Bobkov A. V. 1931
- Krylatykh A. R. 1931-1937
- Rychkov G. S. 1937 1938
- Kuvshinov Y. I. 1938-1941
- Fortunatov N. I. 1942-1945
- Palenko L. A. 1945-1951
- Rubtsov V. I. 1951-1962
- Zhitkov P. N. 1962-1964
- Dudarev A. D. 1964-1971
- Artyukhovsky A. K. 1971-1985
- Popov V. K. 1985-2005
- Bugakov V. M. 2005 - 2015
- Drapaluk M. V. 2015–present

== Faculties, fields and profiles of training ==
- Faculty of Forestry
- Automobile Faculty
- Faculty of Forestry Industry
- Faculty of Economics
- Faculty of Mechanics
- Faculty of Distance Learning
- Center for Distance Education
- Centre for Additional Professional Education
