= Aleksandr Gusev (politician) =

Russian politician (born 1963)

- Александр Гусев
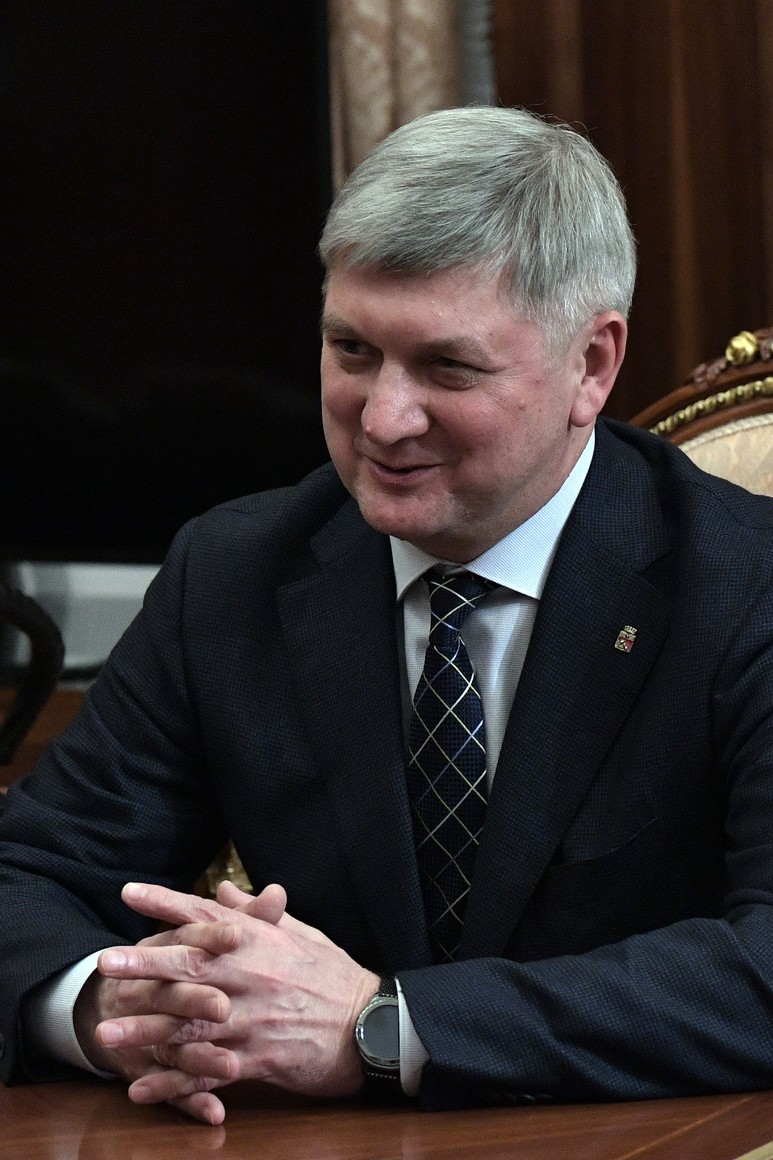
- Gusev in 2017

7th Governor of Voronezh Oblast
- Incumbent
- Assumed office 15 September 2018
- Preceded by: Alexey Gordeyev

Governor of Voronezh Oblast (acting)
- In office 25 December 2017 – 15 September 2018

Mayor of Voronezh
- In office 13 September 2013 – 25 December 2017
- Preceded by: Gennady Chernushkin (acting)
- Succeeded by: Vadim Kstenin

Personal details
- Born: 27 July 1963 (age 63) Ozyorskoye, Kozelsky District, Kaluga Oblast, RSFSR, Soviet Union
- Party: United Russia
- Spouse: Valentina Aleksandrovna Guseva
- Children: 1

Aleksandr Viktorovich Gusev (Russian: Александр Викторович Гусев; born on 27 July 1963), is a Russian statesman, who is currently serving as the 7th governor of Voronezh Oblast since 15 September 2018.

He had served as the mayor of Voronezh from 2013 to 2017.

He had also served as the general director of Voronezhsintezkauchuk, the city's major rubber and plastic manufacturing corporation, from 2007 to 2009.

== Biography ==
Aleksandr Gusev was born on 27 July 1963, to his mother Vera Filippovna, who had been a nurse. His father, Viktor, died when he was only one and a half years old.

In 1985, he graduated from the Yaroslavl Polytechnic Institute with a degree in chemical technology of synthetic rubber.

From August 1985 to November 1992, he worked at the Voronezhsintezkauchuk plant as a shop shift foreman, shop shift supervisor, senior shop technologist, production engineer, and deputy shop chief.

Between 1995 and 2007, he had been the head of production, technical director, first deputy general director of Voronezhsintezkauchuk. In 2004, he received an MBA from the Academy of National Economy under the Government of Russia.

During his work in the chemical industry, he co-authored 35 inventions in his specialty, including those related to technologies for eliminating acid emissions from rubber industries, obtaining thermoplastic elastomers for road surfaces and a number of others.

In 2005, he defended his thesis "Synthesis of neodymium and polybutadiene carboxylates with a high content of 1,4-cis units in their presence" for the degree of candidate of chemical sciences.

From 2007 to March 2009, he was promoted to the general director of the enterprise.

From April 2009 to September 2013, Gusev held government positions in the Voronezh Oblast: deputy prime minister – head of the Department of Industry, Transport and Communications; deputy prime minister – head of the Department of Industry, Transport, Communications and Innovation; deputy governor of the Voronezh Oblast – first deputy chairman of the government of the Voronezh Oblast.

=== Mayor of Voronezh ===
On 8 September 2013, Gusev was elected as the Mayor of Voronezh, and took office on 13 September.

=== Governor of Voronezh Oblast ===
On 25 December 2017, Gusev was appointed the acting governor of Voronezh Oblast.

On 9 September 2018, Gusev was elected as the 7th governor of Voronezh Oblast. Soon after his election, he found himself at the center of a highly publicized personnel scandal.

On 15 September 2018, the day that he took office, he fired his deputy, and paid him a “golden parachute” of 23 salaries and provided him with an unlimited supplement of 75% of his salary to his pension, and after 2 days he had hired him again.

In 2019, according to the results of the assessment of the activities of the heads of the constituent entities of Russia, carried out by the Center for Information Communications "Rating", Gusev took 14th place.

Since 12 October 2020, he has been the head of the Regional Industrial Policy subgroup of the Working Group of the State Council of Russia in the Industry direction.

== Family ==
He is married to his wife, Valentina Aleksandrovna Guseva, and has a daughter Yekaterina, who is a graduate of the Voronezh State University.
