= Voronezh Oblast Duma =

Regional parliament of Voronezh Oblast, Russia

Voronezh Oblast Duma Воронежская областная дума
- 7th legislature

Type
- Type: Unicameral

Leadership
- Chairman: Vladimir Netyosov, United Russia since 25 September 2015

Structure
- Seats: 56
- Political groups: United Russia (51) CPRF (3); LDPR (1); New People (1)

Elections
- Voting system: Mixed
- Last election: 12–14 September 2025
- Next election: 2030

Meeting place
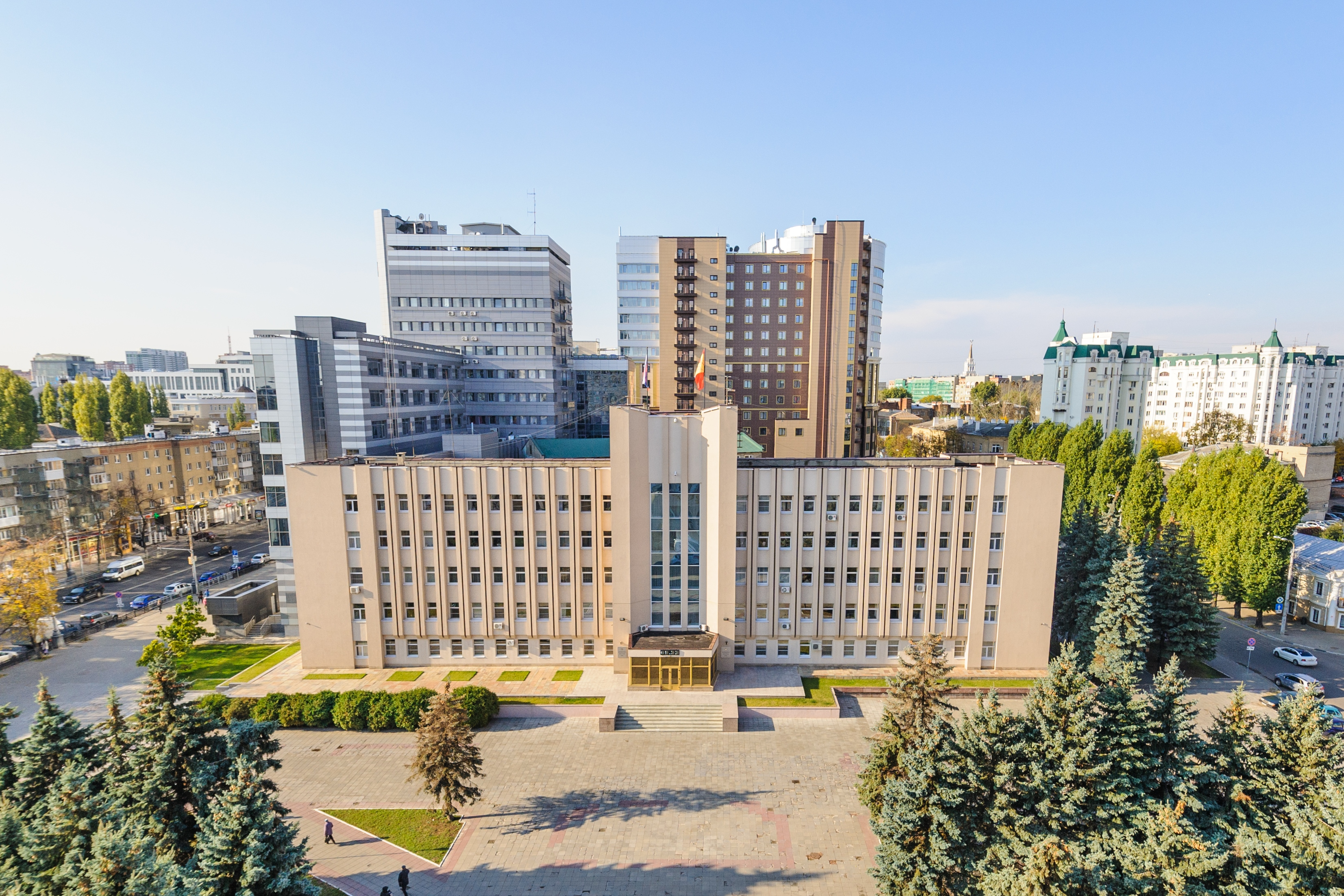
- 2 Kirova Street, Voronezh

Website
- vrnoblduma.ru

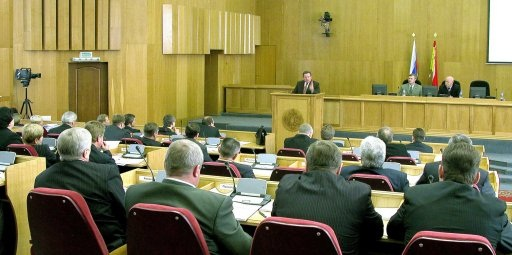
Voronezh Oblast Duma

The Voronezh Oblast Duma (Russian: Воронежская областная дума, romanized: Voronezhskaya oblastnaya duma) is the regional parliament of Voronezh Oblast, a federal subject of Russia. A total of 56 deputies are elected for five-year terms.

== Elections ==
=== 2020 ===
Party	%	Seats
United Russia	61.52	48
Communist Party of the Russian Federation	14.50	4
Liberal Democratic Party of Russia	7.32	2
A Just Russia	5.69	2
Registered voters/turnout	44.14	

=== 2025 ===
Party	%	Seats
United Russia	73.88	51
Communist Party of the Russian Federation	9.26	3
Liberal Democratic Party of Russia	5.80	1
New People	5.67	1
A Just Russia	2.24	0
Rodina	1.61	0
Invalid ballots	1.53	
Registered voters/turnout	54.81	
