= Voronezh Oblast =

First-level administrative division of Russia

Voronezh Oblast Воронежская область (Russian)
- Oblast
- Flag Coat of arms

- Coordinates: 51°03′N 40°09′E
- Country: Russia
- Federal district: Central
- Economic region: Central Black Earth
- Established: June 13, 1934
- Administrative center: Voronezh

Government
  - Body: Oblast Duma
  - Governor: Alexander Gusev

Area
  - Total: 52,216 km^{2} (20,161 sq mi)
  - Rank: 51st

Population (2021 census)
  - Total: 2,308,792 ▼: 90.1% Russians; 0.6% Ukrainians; 0.5% Armenians; 0.2% Romani people; 2.8% other; 5.8% not stated
  - Estimate (2018): 2,333,768
  - Rank: 21st
  - Density: 44.216/km^{2} (114.52/sq mi)
  - Urban: 68.5%
  - Rural: 31.5%

GDP (nominal, 2024)
  - Total: ₽1.72 trillion (US$20.16 billion)
  - Per capita: ₽757,722 (US$8,891.26)
- Time zone: UTC+3 (MSK)
- ISO 3166 code: RU-VOR
- License plates: 36, 136
- OKTMO ID: 20000000
- Official languages: Russian
- Website: https://www.govvrn.ru/

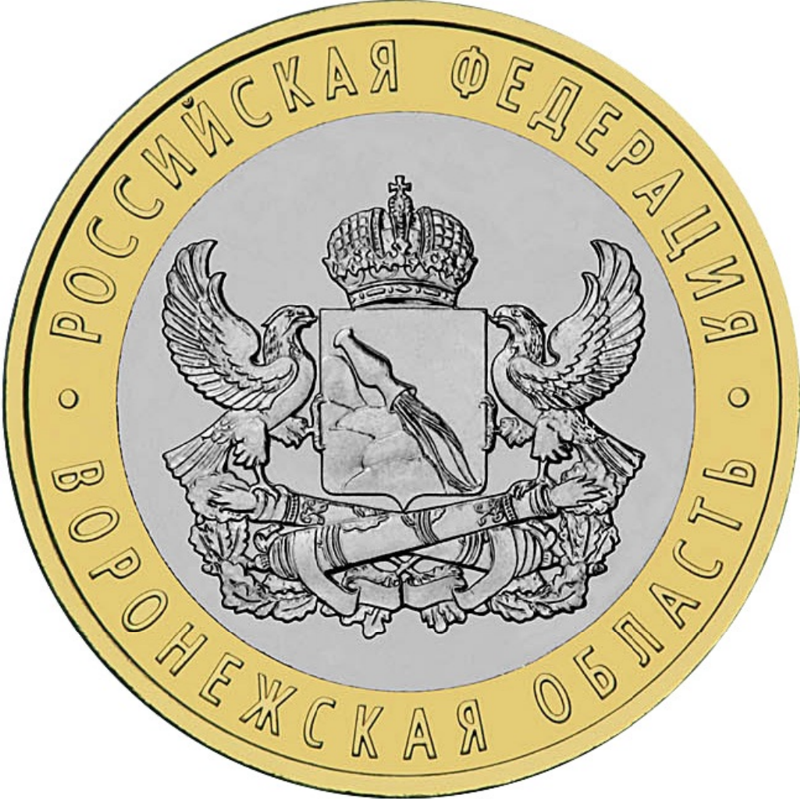
Commemorative coin of the Bank of Russia with a face value of 10 rubles (2011)

Voronezh Oblast (Russian: Воронежская о́бласть, romanized: Voroniežskaja oblastʹ) is a federal subject of Russia (an oblast). Its administrative center is the city of Voronezh. Its population was 2,308,792 as of the 2021 Census.

== Geography ==
Voronezh Oblast
- Interactive map of Voronezh Oblast

Voronezh Oblast borders internally with Belgorod Oblast, Kursk Oblast, Lipetsk Oblast, Tambov Oblast, Saratov Oblast, Volgograd Oblast and Rostov Oblast and internationally with Luhansk Oblast in Ukraine.

Voronezh Oblast is located in the center of the European part of Russia, intersecting to the transport links to the site going to the industrial regions of Russia. Within the radius (12 hours of driving 80 km/h) 960 kilometers around Voronezh more than 50% of the population Russia, and 40% in Ukraine live.

The area of the region is 52,400 km^{2}, which is about one third of the whole area of Central Black Earth Region. The length of the region from north to south is 277.5 km, and from west to east – 352 km. Much of the area is steppe, among the predominant soil fertile soil black earth.

=== Main rivers ===
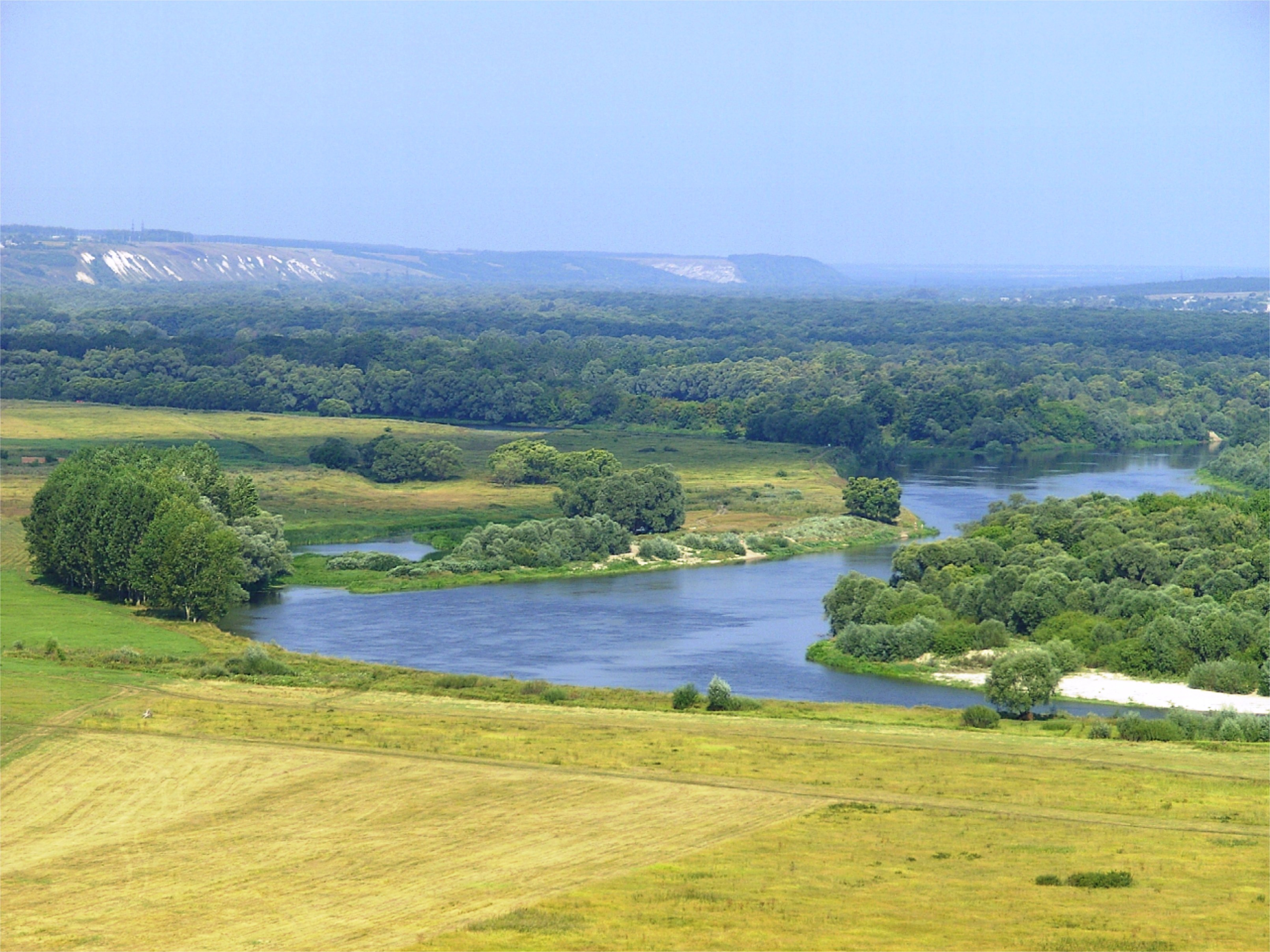
Don River, Voronezh Oblast

The oblast has 738 lakes and ponds in 2408, in 1343 the river flows over 10 km long. The main river is the Don, 530 of its 1,870 km flows through the area, forming a drainage area of 422,000 square kilometers.

- Don
- Voronezh
- Bityug
- Khopyor

=== Climate ===
The climate in the region is temperate continental, with an average January temperatures of −4.5 °C (23.9 °F), and with an average July temperatures of +25 to +30 °C (77 to 86 °F). Average annual temperature varies from +5 °C (41 °F) in the north to +6.5 °C (43.7 °F) in the south. Precipitation varies from 600 millimeters (24 in) in the northwest to 450 millimeters (18 in) in the southeast.

== History ==
The oblast was established on 13 June 1934.

On 21 May 1998 Voronezh alongside Amur, Ivanovo, Kostroma Oblast, and the Mari El Republic signed a power-sharing agreement with the federal government, granting it autonomy. This agreement would be abolished on 22 February 2002.

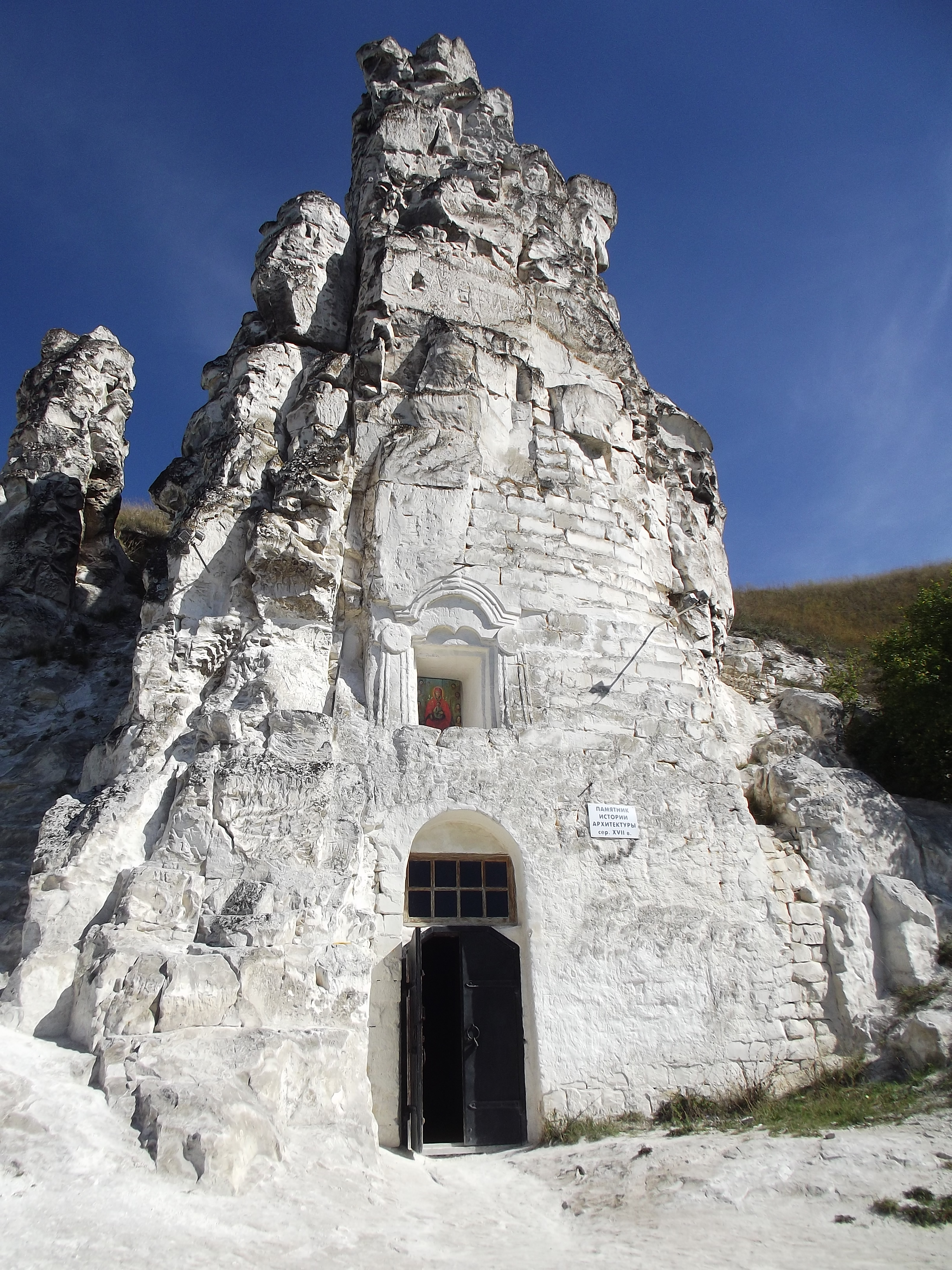
The cave church Sicilian Mother of God in the Big Divah Museum, Reserve Divnogorie, Liski district of Voronezh region

Kostyonki, which is located within the Voronezh Oblast, is known for high concentration of cultural remains of anatomically modern humans from the beginning of the Upper Paleolithic era. The first and oldest camp rights in Europe. A layer of Campanian volcanic ash from about 40,000 years ago has been found above some of the finds, showing that "unknown humans" inhabited the site before this. The earliest directly dated human remains from this site are dated to 32,600 ± 1,100 14C years and consist of tibia and fibula, with traits classifying the bones to European early modern humans.

In 2009, DNA was extracted from the remains of a male hunter-gatherer who lived 40,000 years BP and died aged 20–25. His maternal lineage was found to be U2. He was buried in an oval pit in a crouched position and covered with red ochre.

== Administrative divisions ==
Voronezh Oblast map

== Economy ==
The structure of Voronezh Oblast the industrial-agrarian. As part of the industry is dominated by mechanical engineering, power systems engineering, food industry, processing industry of agricultural raw materials, they account for 80% of the total volume of industrial output. Industry specialization of the region is the food industry (27%), second place is occupied by engineering and metalworking (23%), third place – power (18%).

Industry of the region specializes in the production of machine tools, oil and gas equipment, rocket engines, metal bridge structures, press-forging and mining equipment, electronic equipment, passenger aircraft Airbus.

The largest companies in the region include Sozvezdie (revenues of $414.79 million in 2017), Molvest (dairy industry; $293.1 million), Voronezhsintezkauchuk (Sibur group; $186.83 million), the Russian branch of COFCO Group ($161.12 million).

=== Agriculture ===
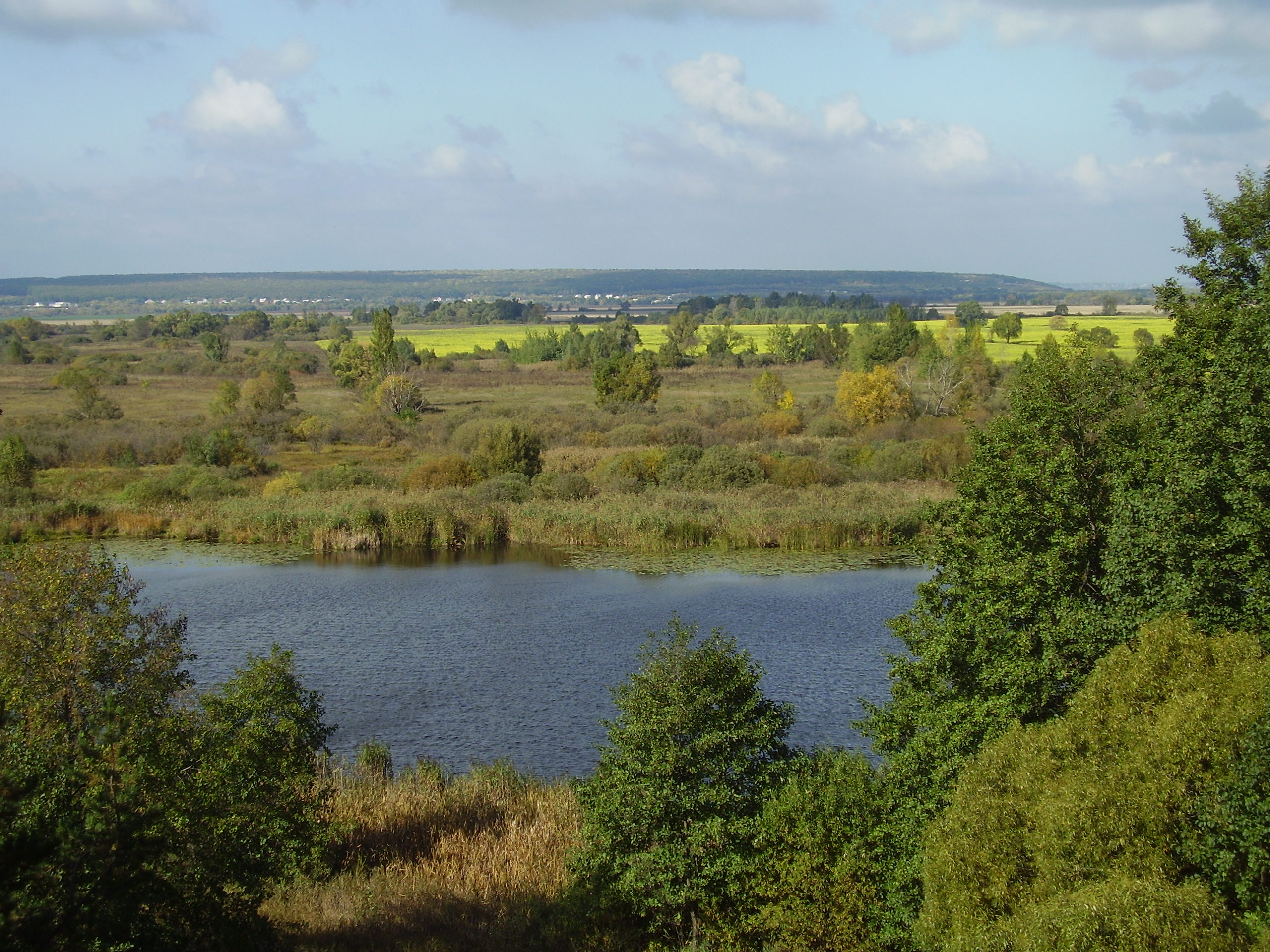
A lake near Voronezh

Voronezh Oblast is a major supplier of agricultural products. For the first time in the history of farming region in 2011 produced record crops: sugar beet (factory) – 6,992 thousand. Tons (3.9 times more than in 2010) and sunflower – 1,002 thousand tons (2, 4 times more than in 2010) 2014 Voronezh Oblast ranked first in Russia in terms of gross harvest of potatoes, in farms of all categories have been collected 1.757 million tons of potatoes.

In general, the profile of agriculture – with crops of sunflowers and grain crops, dairy and beef cattle, pigs. Beet, sugar beet industry in Voronezh Oblast in terms of gross production of sugar beets and making sugar beet is one of the largest in the country. In 2014, sugar mills were produced 495.1 ths. tons of sugar.

Milk production in Voronezh Oblast in 2013 increased by 1.8% – up to 755,700 tons. In 2014 it increased by 4.2% to ↗788 000 tons, according to this indicator Voronezh Oblast takes first place in the Central Federal District. Milk yield per cow dairy herd in 2014 increased by 10.9% and amounted to 5545 kg.

== Politics ==
During the Soviet period, the high authority in the oblast was shared between three persons: The first secretary of the Voronezh CPSU Committee (who in reality had the biggest authority), the chairman of the oblast Soviet (legislative power), and the chairman of the oblast Executive Committee (executive power). Since 1991, CPSU lost all the power, and the head of the Oblast administration, and eventually the governor was appointed/elected alongside elected regional parliament.

The Charter of Voronezh Oblast is the fundamental law of the region. The Legislative Assembly of Voronezh Oblast is the province's standing legislative (representative) body. The Legislative Assembly exercises its authority by passing laws, resolutions, and other legal acts and by supervising the implementation and observance of the laws and other legal acts passed by it. The highest executive body is the Oblast Government, which includes territorial executive bodies such as district administrations, committees, and commissions that facilitate development and run the day to day matters of the province. The Oblast administration supports the activities of the Governor who is the highest official and acts as guarantor of the observance of the oblast Charter in accordance with the Constitution of Russia.

== Demographics ==
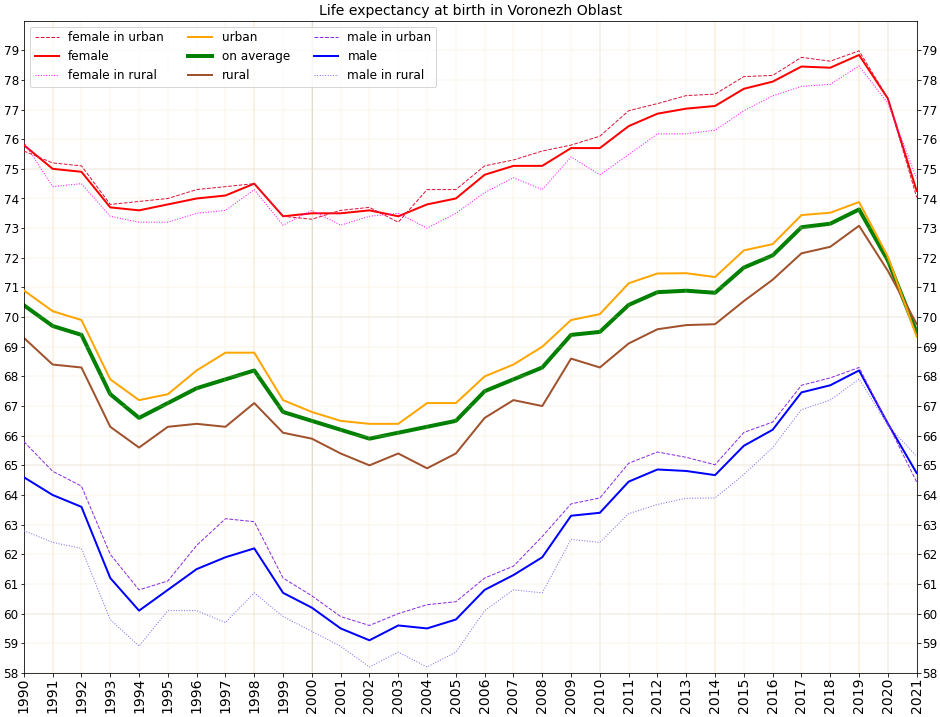
Life expectancy at birth in Voronezh Oblast

Historical population
| Year | Pop. | ±% |
|---|---|---|
| 1959 | 2,368,695 | — |
| 1970 | 2,526,928 | +6.7% |
| 1979 | 2,478,544 | −1.9% |
| 1989 | 2,469,766 | −0.4% |
| 2002 | 2,378,803 | −3.7% |
| 2010 | 2,335,380 | −1.8% |
| 2021 | 2,308,792 | −1.1% |
Source: Census data

Population: 2,308,792 (2021 census); 2,335,380 (2010 census); 2,378,803 (2002 census); 2,469,766 (1989 Soviet census).

Vital statistics for 2024:

- Births: 15,725 (6.9 per 1,000)
- Deaths: 33,419 (14.8 per 1,000)

Total fertility rate (2024):
1.21 children per woman

Life expectancy (2021):
Total — 69.49 years (male — 64.74, female — 74.26)

Ethnicity population (2021)
| Ethnicity | Number | % |
|---|---|---|
| Russians | 2,081,246 | 90.1 |
| Ukrainians | 13,260 | 0.6 |
| Armenians | 10,908 | 0.5 |
| Romani People | 5,197 | 0.2 |
| Other Ethnicity | 65,415 | 2.8 |
| Ethnicity not stated | 132,763 | 5.8 |

=== Settlements ===
Largest cities or towns in Voronezh Oblast 2010 Russian Census
| Rank | | Administrative Division | Pop. |
|---|---|---|---|
| 1 | Voronezh | City of Oblast significance of Voronezh | 1,058,261 |
| 2 | Borisoglebsk | Town of oblast significance of Borisoglebsk | 65,585 |
| 3 | Rossosh | Rossoshansky District | 62,865 |
| 4 | Liski | Liskinsky District | 55,864 |
| 5 | Ostrogozhsk | Ostrogozhsky District | 33,842 |
| 6 | Novovoronezh | Town of oblast significance of Novovoronezh | 32,635 |
| 7 | Novaya Usman | Novousmansky District | 29,270 |
| 8 | Buturlinovka | Buturlinovsky District | 27,208 |
| 9 | Semiluki | Semiluksky District | 26,023 |
| 10 | Pavlovsk | Pavlovsky District | 25,126 |

=== Religion ===
Religion in Voronezh Oblast as of 2012 (Sreda Arena Atlas)
| Russian Orthodoxy | 62% |
| Other Orthodox | 0.7% |
| Other Christians | 3.8% |
| Spiritual but not religious | 21.5% |
| Atheism and irreligion | 6% |
| Other and undeclared | 6% |

According to a 2012 survey 62% of the population of Voronezh Oblast adheres to the Russian Orthodox Church, and 3.4% are unaffiliated Christians. In addition, 21.5% of the population deems itself to be "spiritual but not religious", 6% is atheist, and 7.1% follows other religions or did not give an answer to the question.

== Notable people ==
- Pavel Cherenkov, co-recipient of the 1958 Nobel Prize in Physics
- Alexandra Pavlovna Biryukova, 2nd woman appointed to the Politburo of the Communist Party of the Soviet Union

== See also ==
- List of Chairmen of the Voronezh Oblast Duma
