= 2021 Russian legislative election =

- 17–19 September 2021

All 450 seats in the State Duma 226 seats needed for a majority
- Opinion polls
- Turnout: 51.72% (▲3.84 pp)
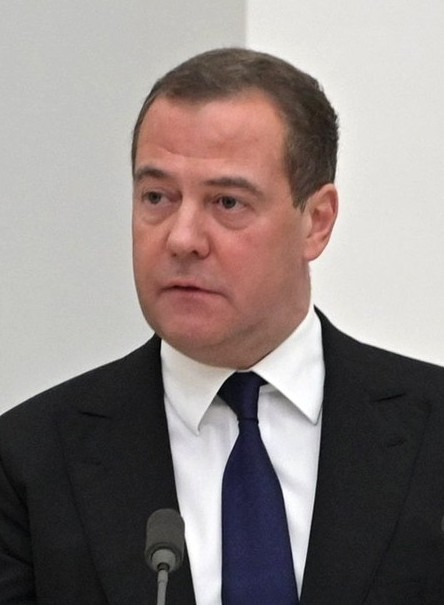

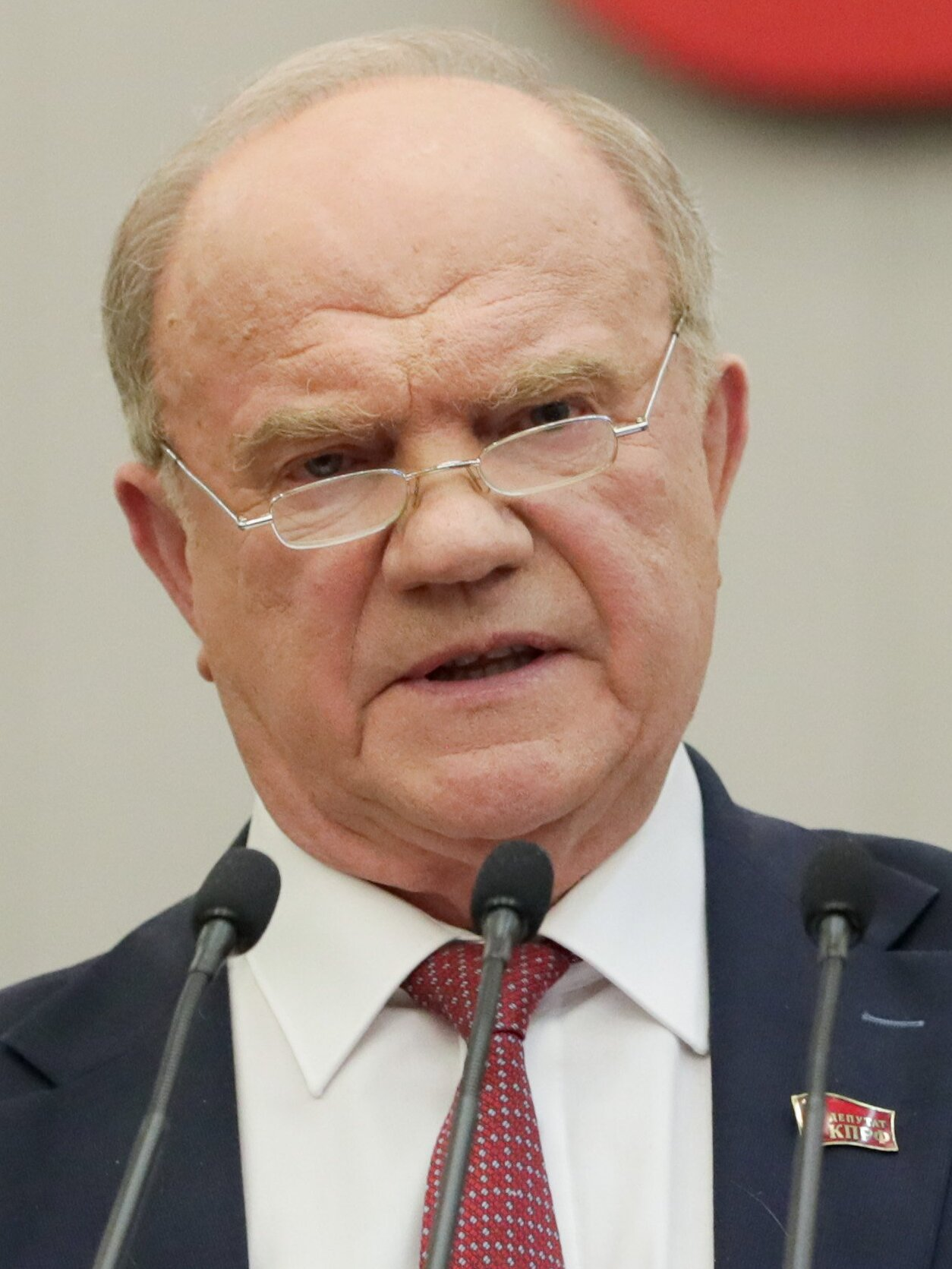

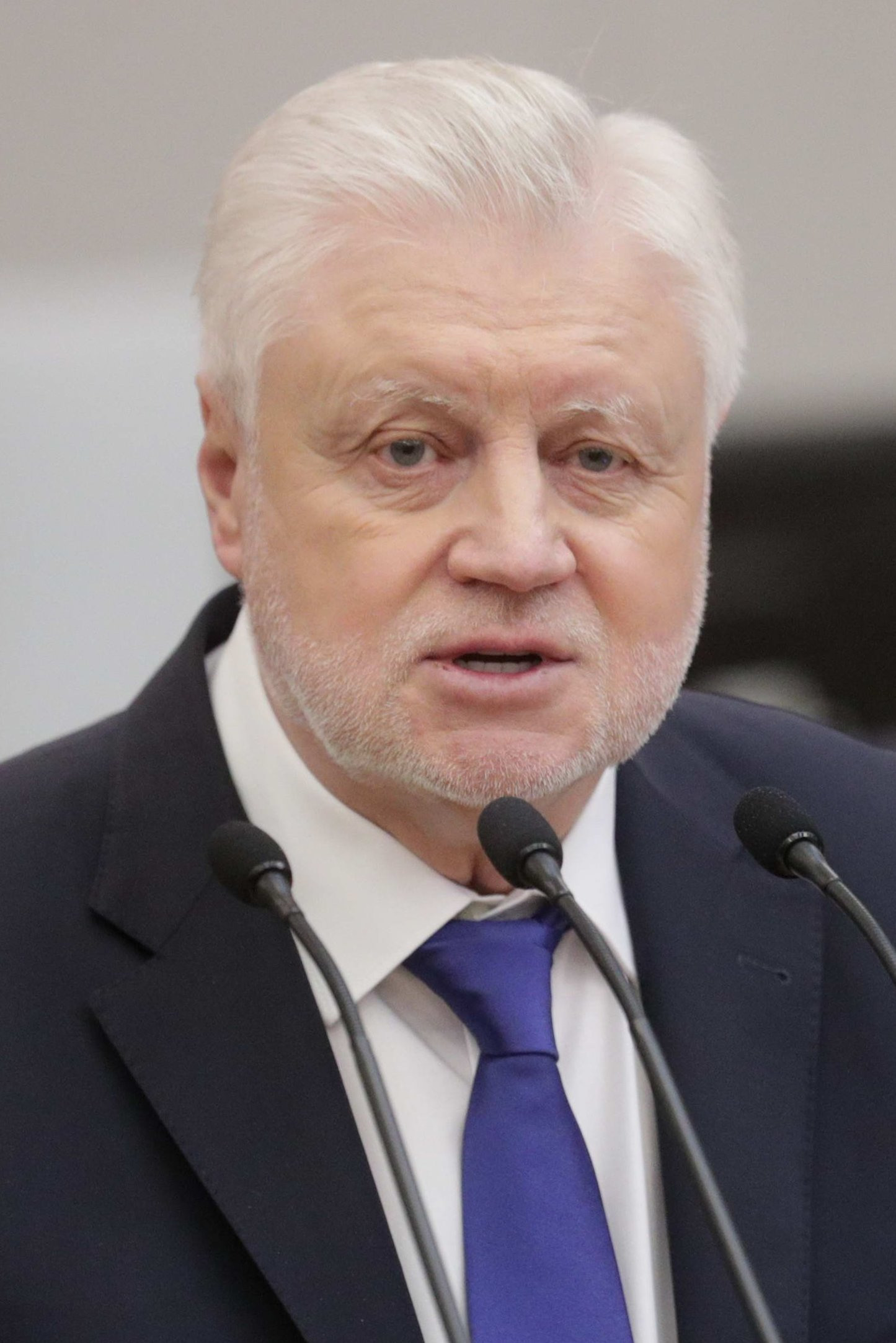

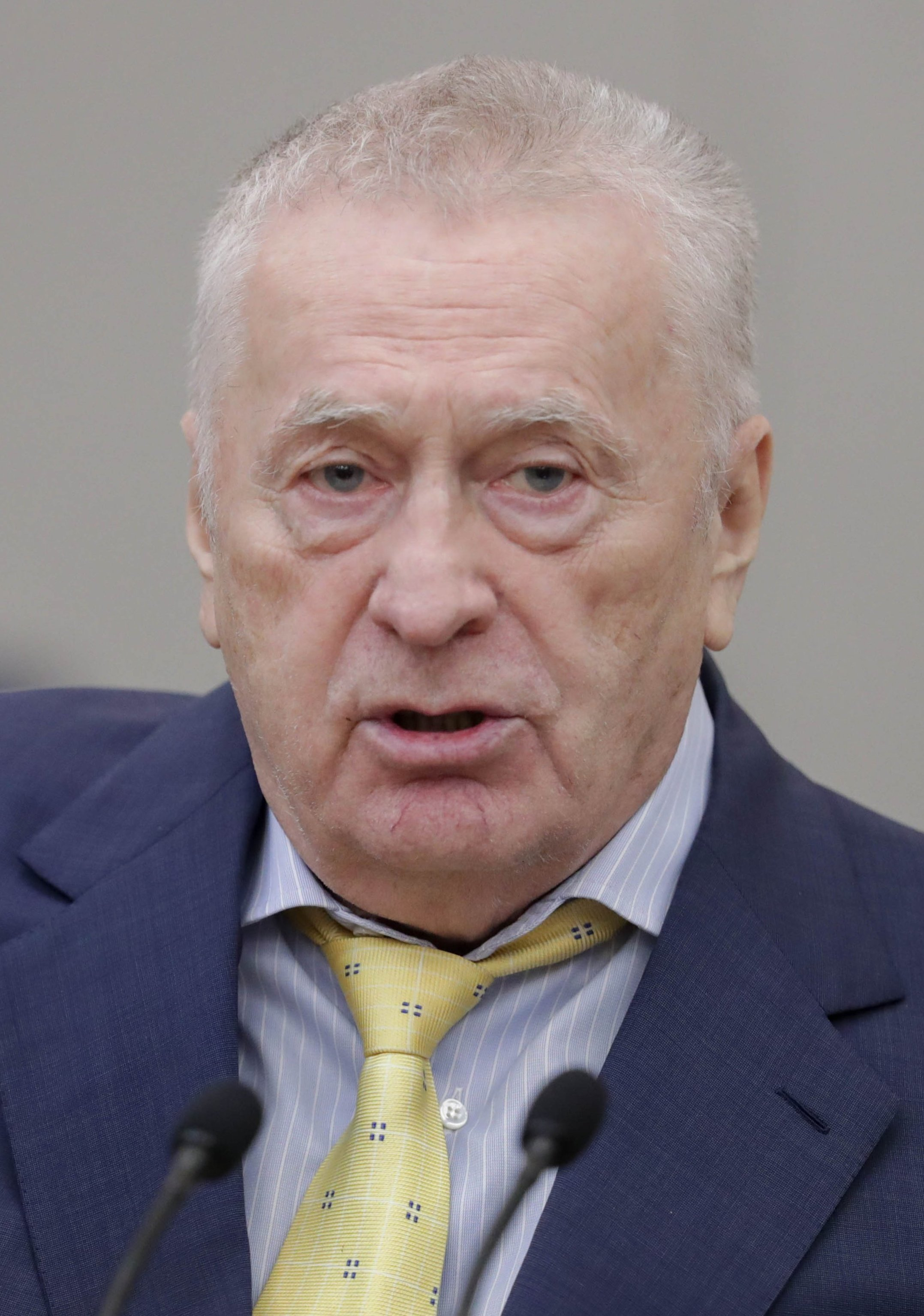

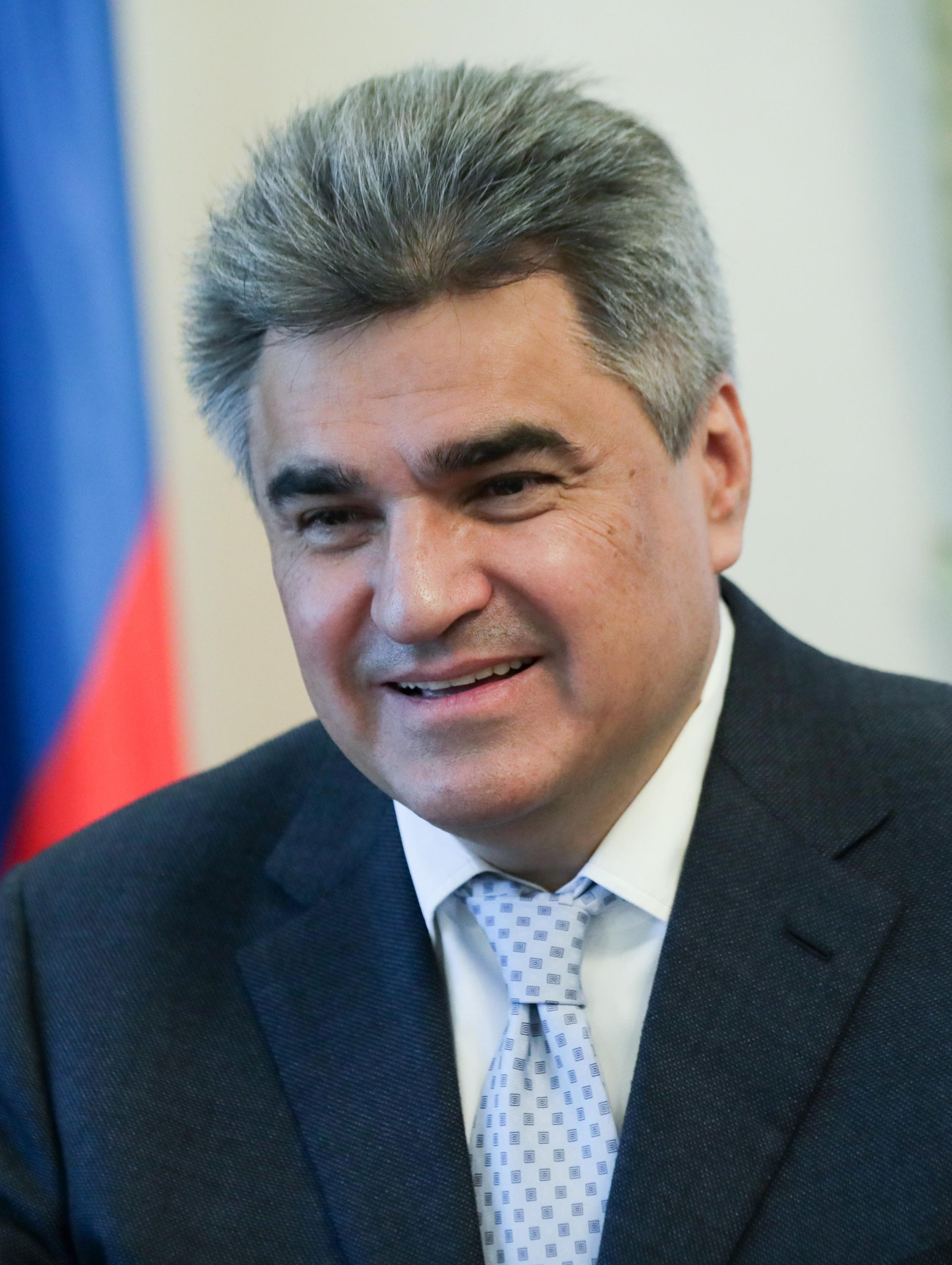
	First party	Second party	Third party
Leader	Dmitry Medvedev	Gennady Zyuganov	Sergey Mironov
Party	United Russia	CPRF	SRZP
Leader since	26 May 2012	14 February 1993	27 October 2013
Leader's seat	Did not stand	Federal list	Federal list
Last election	343 seats, 54.20%	42 seats, 13.34%	23 seats, 6.81%
Seats won	324	57	27
Seat change	▼19	▲15	▲4
Popular vote	28,064,200	10,660,669	4,201,744
Percentage	49.82%	18.93%	7.46%
Swing	▼4.38pp	▲5.59pp	▲0.65pp
	Fourth party	Fifth party
Leader	Vladimir Zhirinovsky	Alexey Nechayev
Party	LDPR	New People
Leader since	13 December 1989	8 August 2020
Leader's seat	Federal list	Federal list
Last election	39 seats, 13.14%	New
Seats won	21	13
Seat change	▼18	New
Popular vote	4,252,252	2,997,744
Percentage	7.55%	5.32%
Swing	▼5.59pp	New
- The upper map shows the winning parties in federal subjects. The lower map shows the parties of the winners in the single-member constituencies. United Russia CPRF LDPR SRZP Rodina Party of Growth Civic Platform Independents
Chairman of the State Duma before election
Vyacheslav Volodin
United Russia
Elected Chairman of the State Duma
Vyacheslav Volodin
United Russia

Legislative elections were held in Russia from 17 to 19 September 2021 to elect all 450 seats of the State Duma. Going into the elections, United Russia was the ruling party after winning the 2016 elections with 343 of the 450 seats and retaining a supermajority. In March 2020, it was proposed to hold a snap election in September 2020 due to proposed constitutional reforms, but this idea was abandoned. On 18 June 2021, Vladimir Putin signed a decree calling the election for 19 September the same year. Owing to the COVID-19 pandemic in Russia, voting in the election lasted for three days, from 17 to 19 September. (Note: Per decision made by the Central Election Commission (CEC).) Final turnout was reported to be 51.72%.

Fifteen political parties applied for participation, 14 of which were guaranteed automatic access to the ballots, and one unsuccessfully attempted to be included in the ballot by collecting voters' signatures. Half, or 225 seats, of the State Duma were elected through legislative constituencies; the other 225 seats were elected through party lists, which cover the whole of Russia. (Note: The federal circuit (constituency) includes entire Russia.)

Like prior elections in Russia, the election was not free and fair. Many episodes of ballot-stuffing, forced voting, and other irregularities were recorded. Putin's administration and the ruling United Russia party used a managed democracy approach to keep an appearance of political pluralism. The election was marred by the nation's most prominent opposition leaders (particularly those associated with jailed opposition leader Alexei Navalny) and figures being excluded from the ballot, imprisoned or exiled in months coming before the election. Authorities also designated various independent media outlets and non-governmental organisations as "foreign agents", including the independent election monitor Golos. The Organization for Security and Co-operation in Europe (OSCE) also said that it would not send observers for the first time since 1993 due to "major limitations" imposed by Russian authorities.

Following the election, United Russia maintained its constitutional majority despite some losses, taking 324 seats, while it received 49.82% of the vote, according to official results. The Communist Party of the Russian Federation received 57 seats and 18.93% of the vote, while A Just Russia — For Truth received 27 seats and 7.46% of the vote, with the Liberal Democratic Party of Russia receiving 21 seats and 7.55% of the vote. New People received 13 seats and 5.32% of the vote, meaning that for the first time since 2007, a fifth faction would be represented in the State Duma.

The election was marred by widespread accusations of fraud. The introduction of remote electronic voting in several regions was also criticized by the opposition, who alleged widespread vote-rigging, especially in Moscow, with the Communist Party refusing to recognize the results of electronic voting in Moscow. As a result, opposition candidates have sought to annul the electronic voting results by legal means. In response to the election results, protests were held. Statisticians have attributed the results to mass fraud.

== Background ==
=== Early polling, pension reform, and 2018 protests ===
After the 2016 Russian legislative election, United Russia was the most popular party, with its polling rates ranging from 40% to 55%, while the ratings of the main opposition parties were much lower; the Communist Party of the Russian Federation (CPRF) and the Liberal Democratic Party of Russia (LDPR) each had just over 10%, while A Just Russia (JR) was around the 5% threshold required to enter the State Duma.

In June 2018, after Prime Minister Dmitry Medvedev announced a reform to raise the retirement age, the rating of ruling party United Russia fell sharply and since then has fluctuated from around 35% to 25% sparking the 2018 Russian pension protests during summer. At the same time, the CPRF's rating has grown and currently ranges from 11% to 17%, while the rating of JR had also increased but still remained relatively low and varied in between 5% and 8%, and the rating of the LDPR has remained consistent at around 10% to 13%. Polling results differ on whether the CPRF or the LDPRF are ranked as the second most popular party. The ratings of all non-parliamentary parties combined ranges from around 6% to 17%, with exact numbers for each party unknown. When the share of people who answered they would not vote and who are unsure are equally distributed among the parties, voter share for United Russia fluctuates around 41%, the CPRF around 20%, the LDPR around 15%, JR around 8%, and other parties around 14%.

=== 2020 constitutional reform and speculations about a snap election ===
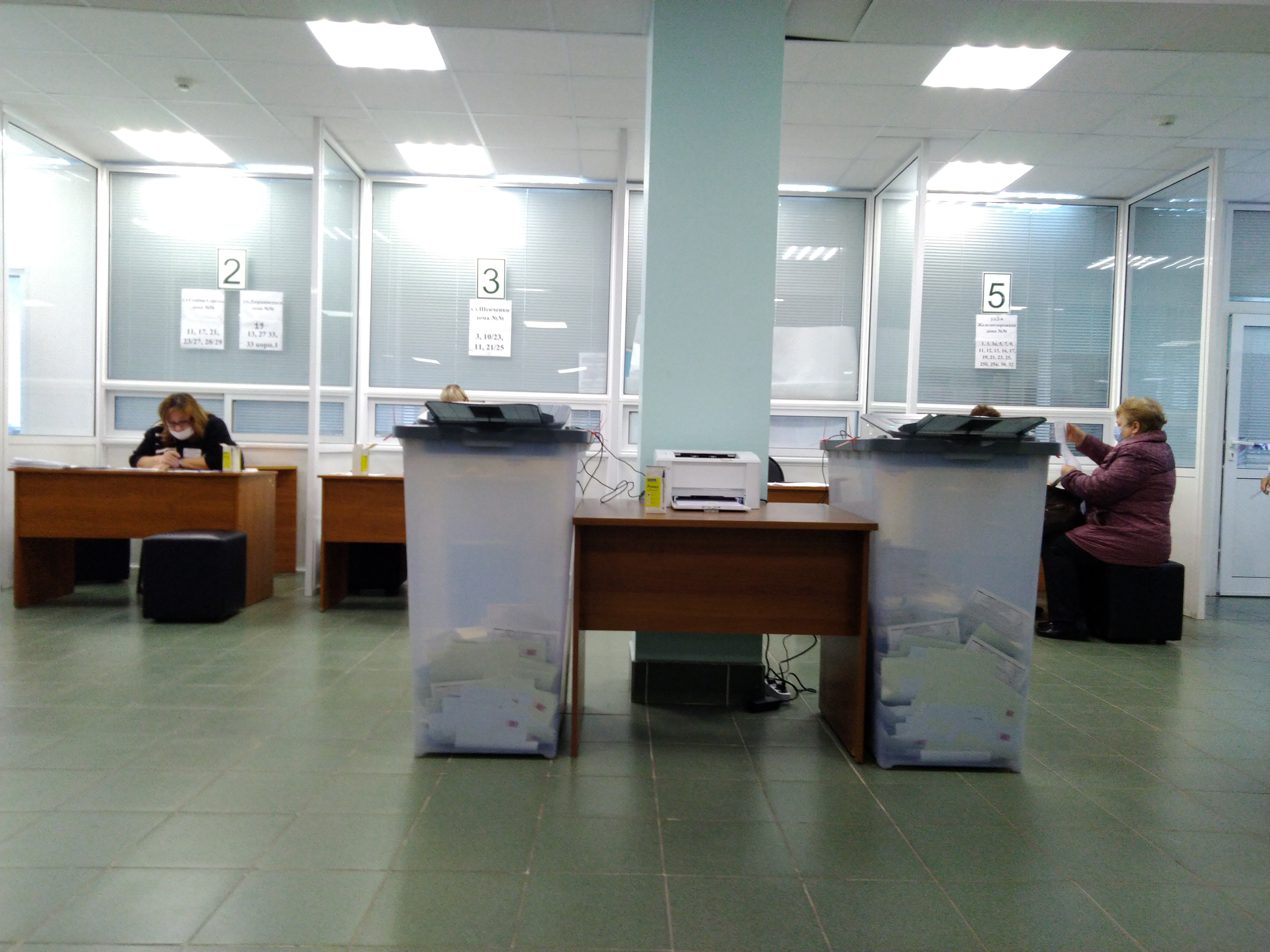
Two voting machines of the polling place on the last day of the election in Ryazan, Russia

During his 2020 Presidential Address to the Federal Assembly on 15 January, President Vladimir Putin proposed a referendum to be held on the number of amendments arguing that a national vote would be necessary to make the changes to the Constitution of Russia "legitimate". The amendments proposed to weaken the executive power and expand the powers of the Federal Assembly. In particular, it is supposed to transfer the power to form a government to the State Duma; this means that if the amendments were adopted, the next Cabinet would be formed by the State Duma. Immediately after Putin's speech, Prime Minister Dmitry Medvedev resigned along with the entire government. On 16 January, Mikhail Mishustin was appointed as the new Prime Minister. After that, there were suggestions about the dissolution of the State Duma and holding a snap election after the constitutional reform; the State Duma can only be dissolved if it refuses the President's appointment of a Prime Minister three times in a row or passes a no-confidence motion against the government. According to sources from the Presidential Administration of Russia, the constitution may be amended to allow self-dissolution of the State Duma. Some political scientists and MPs also have said that the dissolution of the State Duma and holding of a snap election is likely; however, this opinion is not shared by Andrey Klishas, head of the Legal Committee of the Federation Council, who is part of the working group on preparing amendments to the constitution.

During the second reading of the draft law on amendments to the constitution on 10 March, Member of Parliament (MP) Alexander Karelin introduced an amendment on holding a snap election. The amendment gave the State Duma the opportunity to decide once to dissolve itself after the amendments were adopted. At first, the proposal was supported by a majority of deputies; however, because there was no consensus on this issue, with the CPRF in particular against it, President Putin urged not to dissolve the State Duma, and Karelin then withdrew the amendment. If the amendment had been passed, a snap election would have been held on 13 or 20 September 2020. MP Valentina Tereshkova proposed a reset on Putin's presidential terms, which would allow him to stay in office past his second term until 2036, as it was originally set to end in 2024. United Russia supported Tereshkova's proposal, and in Putin's response, "I believe and am deeply convinced that a strong presidential power is absolutely necessary for our country [and] for stability", citing examples of countries without presidential term limits and referencing former United States president Franklin D. Roosevelt, who served four consecutive terms. The decision received backlash among the opposition and political groups, accusing Putin of trying to serve as president for life.

The 2020 constitutional referendum was held from 25 June to 1 July; 78% of Russian voters approved on the new amendments including extension of Putin's term to 2036. Despite the outcome, the referendum was criticized as being flawed with cases of electoral fraud. Unsanctioned protests over the result of the vote occurred to with 140 people being detained in Moscow. In spite of the rejection of the self-dissolution amendment, the legal possibility of holding a snap election remained in the case of a triple refusal of the State Duma to confirm the Prime Minister or Ministers, or a double vote of no confidence in the government. Immediately after the amendments to the constitution came into force, speculation about possible early elections resumed. In particular, Sergey Mironov, the leader of JR, assumed that early elections could be held, referring to the desire of the country's senior leadership. According to analysts, a snap election could have been held in December 2020 or early 2021.

=== COVID-19 pandemic ===
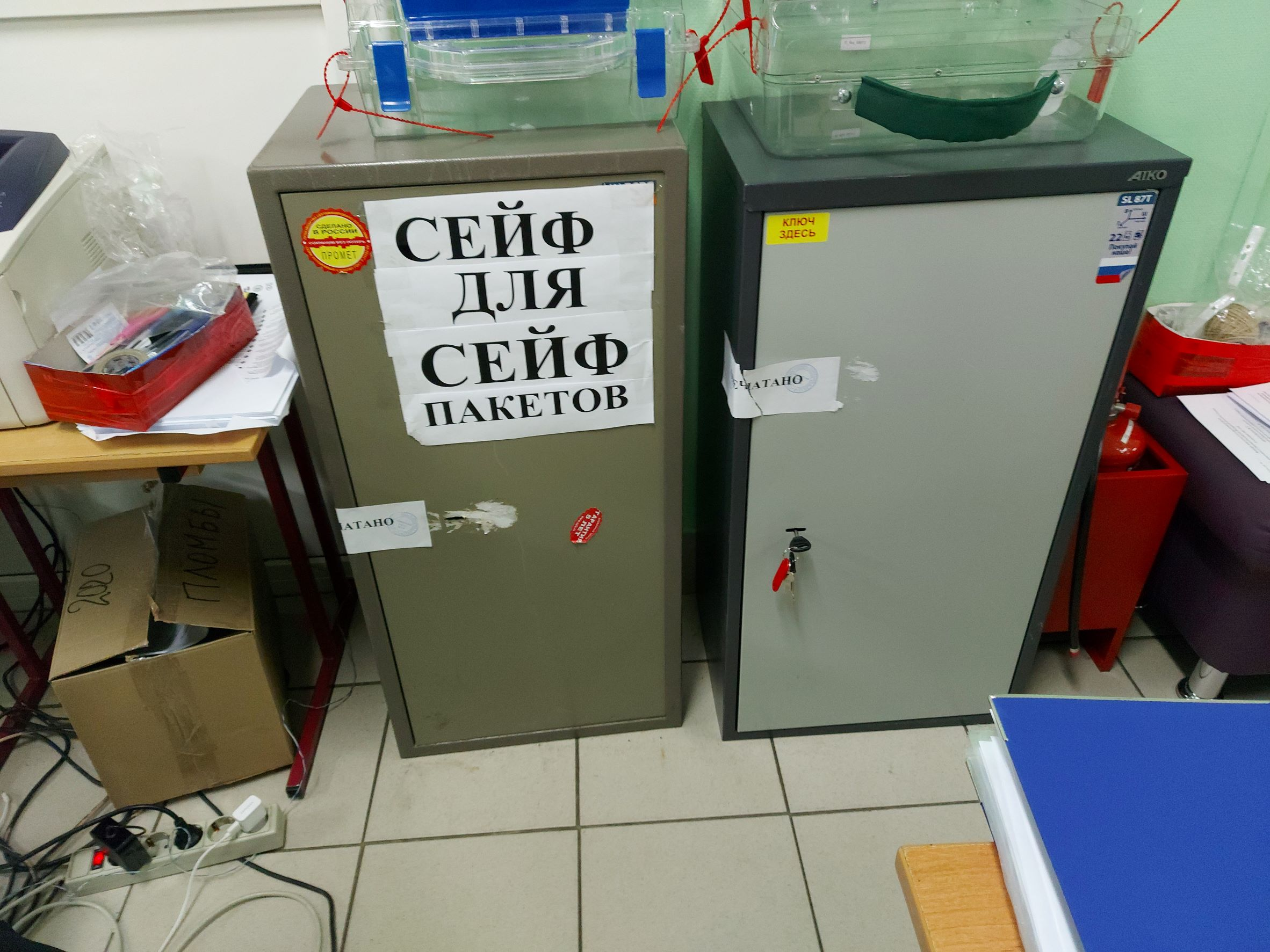
Because of the pandemic the elections lasted for 3 days. In between of election days already cast ballots were stored in packages that in turn were put into safes like these. Reportedly, little was done to make them tamper-proof (note a broken seal on the right door).

Owing to the COVID-19 pandemic, the format of individual electoral events can be changed for health reasons. In 2020, a law was passed that allows early voting at polling stations two days before the official voting day. In addition, the polling stations themselves can be organized outside the premises, but this decision is not mandatory and may be made by the CEC within ten days after the election is scheduled.

=== Barring of opposition candidates ===
A number of opposition candidates were barred from running in the elections, including allies of imprisoned opposition leader Alexei Navalny and other candidates affiliated with him following the designation of his networks, including the Anti-Corruption Foundation, as "extremist" earlier in the year, effectively banning anyone associated with Navalny or his groups from running for office. Navalny allies barred from running include Lyubov Sobol, Ilya Yashin, Oleg Stepanov, Irina Fatyanova, and Alexandra Semenova. Other allies of Navalny were exiled prior to the election and tried to coordinate opposition votes from abroad.

Pavel Grudinin, a high-profile candidate of the CPRF who run in the 2018 Russian presidential election, was excluded from the ballot by the election commission for allegedly owning foreign assets. The CPRF linked the barring of Grudinin to the waning support of the ruling United Russia party and likelihood of opposition parties securing strong results. Party leader Gennady Zyuganov said he would appeal the decision.

Yabloko party candidates who were barred from the legislative elections included Yulia Galyamina, Lev Schlossberg, Viktor Rau, Natalia Rezontova, Yelena Izotova, Ruslan Zinatullin, and Anatoly Nogovitsin. Six Party of Growth candidates (Rafail Gibadullin, Magomed Magomedaliev, Elena Motova, Evgenia Orlova, Alexei Uryvaev, and Zaur Shakhbanov) were eliminated in a single court ruling over alleged foreign funding. Anton Furgal and Roman Yuneman, two independent candidates, were removed from the candidate lists using other legal pretexts.

=== Smart Voting ===
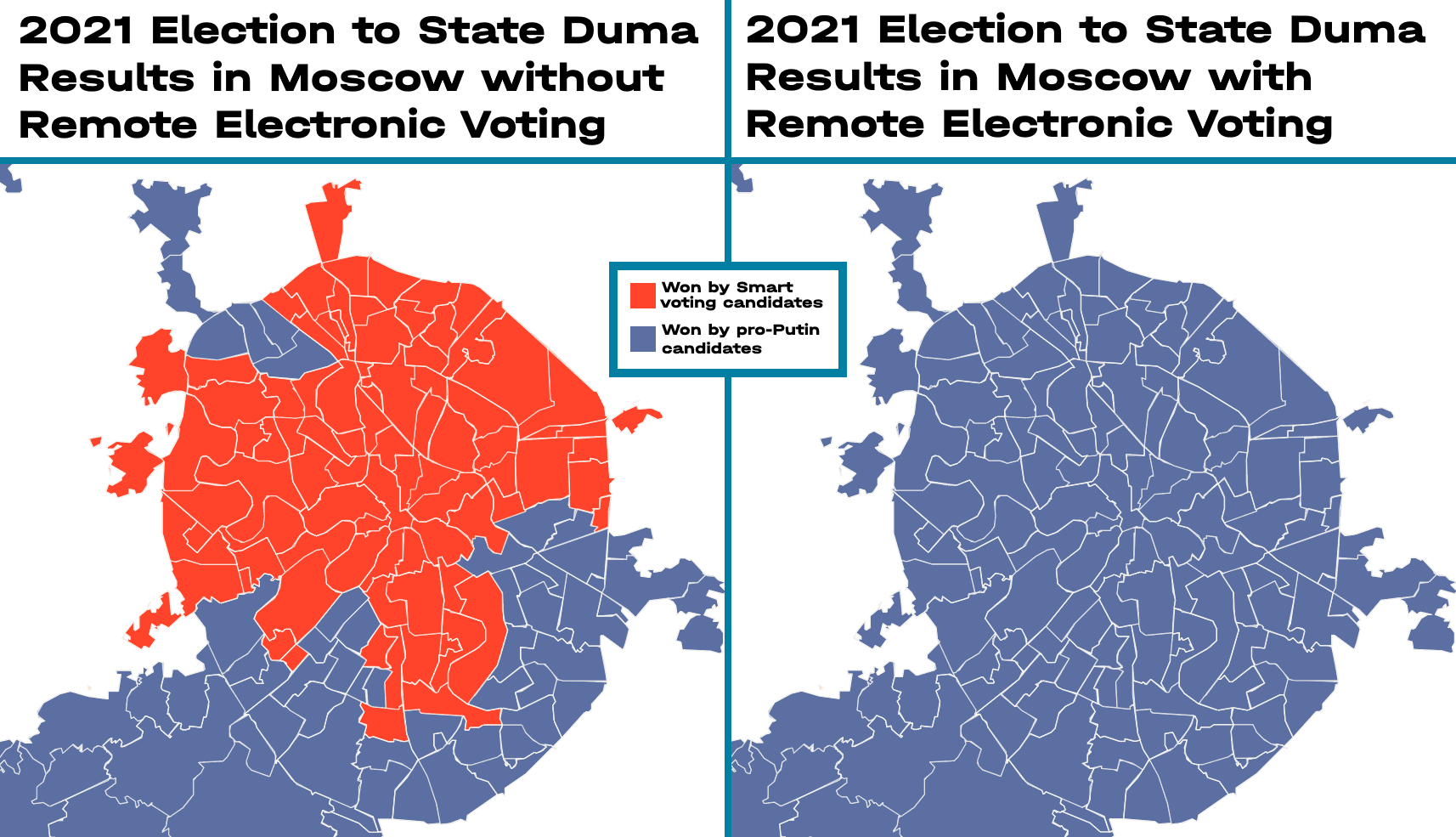
2021 Election to the State Duma with and without Remote Electronic Voting

Smart Voting, a tactical voting strategy created by Navalny and his team aimed at electing candidates with the best chance of defeating those backed by the Kremlin and the ruling United Russia party, faced a crackdown by authorities before the election. Navalny urged voters to use the Smart Voting website to vote against pro-Kremlin candidates. Smart Voting was previously used twice in regional elections, helping opposition candidates win 20 of 45 seats in the 2019 Moscow City Duma election and United Russia lose its majorities in the legislatures of the cities of Novosibirsk, Tambov, and Tomsk. Navalny ally Leonid Volkov stated that "15%-20% of candidates endorsed by Smart Voting have won seats in legislatures".

On 3 September, the Moscow Arbitration Court ordered Google and Yandex to stop displaying the search term "smart voting" (in Russian) from its search results, after a wool company called Woolintertrade, which registered a trademark with the phrase during the summer, demanded that the phrase be removed from search results. According to a report by BBC Russian, the company, founded in Dagestan, may have ties with Russian police. Navalny ally Ivan Zhdanov called the decision "illegal" and also said: "It's naive to think that some company can register a trademark in a month, and then quickly file a lawsuit in the Moscow court and immediately get interim measures".

On 6 September, access to the Smart Voting website in Russia was cut off, with Volkov stating that authorities had used a TSPU (technical tools to counter threats) system as part of the Sovereign Internet Law. Roskomnadzor said the website was blocked because it was being used to "continue the activities and holding events of an extremist organisation". The previous week, Roskomnadzor warned Apple and Google that it could face fines if the Smart Voting mobile app was not removed from their stores.

On 15 September, Roskomnadzor reportedly began temporarily blocking Google Docs after the lists of Smart Voting endorsements had been released, later restoring access to the service by the next day. Roskomnadzor denied it ordered any blocking of the site. Navalny's team subsequently published the list on GitHub. On 18 September, Navalny's team shared a letter by Google ordering the deletion of the endorsements on Google Docs otherwise it may block access to them. According to the document, Google states that the content is illegal in Russia as the URLs to the documents appear on the government's registry of banned resources.

On 17 September, as elections began, Google and Apple removed the app from their stores. According to Agence France-Presse, the decision was made after significant pressure from authorities which included threats of criminal charges and arrest of staff in Russia. Later that day, Telegram blocked the Smart Voting chat bot. Telegram founder and CEO Pavel Durov said that Telegram would "limit the functioning of bots associated with election campaigns" and abide by Russia's "election silence", where campaigning during voting is banned. Durov also stated that he was following Apple and Google, which "dictate the rules of the game to developers like us", while adding that "the blocking of applications by Apple and Google creates a dangerous precedent that will affect freedom of speech in Russia and around the world." Google also complied with Russian government requests to remove YouTube videos by Navalny where users attempting to access the videos were met with a message that read: "This content is not available on this country domain due to a legal complaint from the government."

=== Pre-election payments ===
On 24 August, Russian president Vladimir Putin signed off one-off cash payments of 10,000 rubles ($135) for pensioners after proposing payments for pensioners and military servicemen two days earlier during a meeting with United Russia candidates. On 31 August, Putin approved one-off cash payments of 15,000 rubles ($200) for law enforcement, servicemen, firefighters and others, with the move seen by critics as bolstering support for the ruling party, while the Kremlin denied that the payments were connected to the election. Russian journalist Dmitry Kolezev described the military and police payments as a means to ensure the loyalty of the security forces that the government would rely upon to disperse protests. The COVID-19 pandemic in Russia and the stagnating economy may have played a role in justification of the tactic.

== Electoral system ==
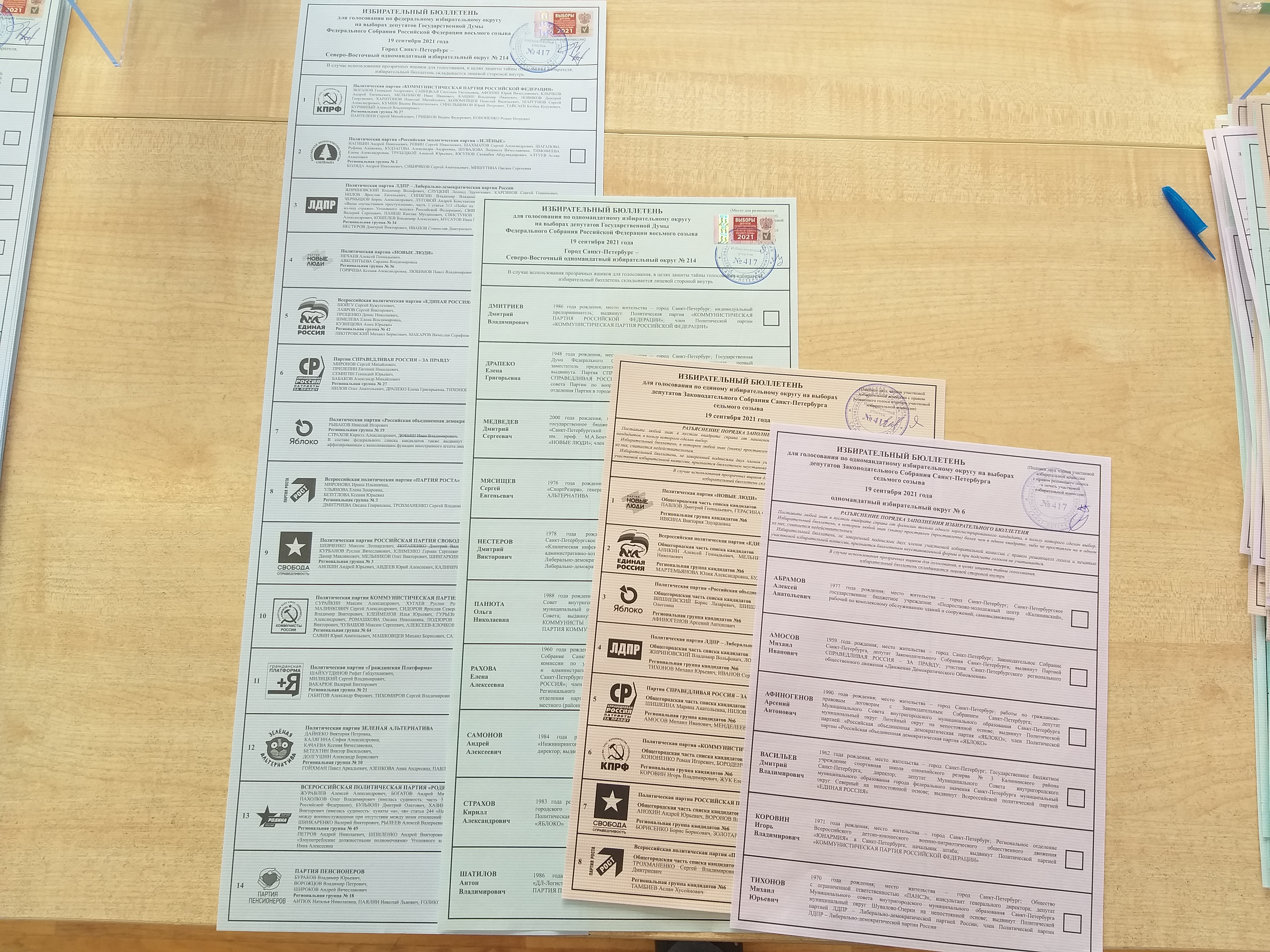
Ballots for voting for different MP candidates and parties in different circuits (constituencies) of both Russia-wide and local Saint Petersburg elections. From left to right: a ballot for parliamentary parties in the federal circuit (blue tinted); a ballot for candidates in a single mandate circuit (green tinted); a ballot for parliamentary parties in the Saint Petersburg's circuit (yellow tinted); a ballot for candidates in a single mandate in the Saint Petersburg's circuit (pink tinted)

As of 2021, under Article 96 of Constitution of Russia the service term of the State Duma is limited to five years and each seat is allocated through a parallel voting: one ballot for party-lists and one ballot for a single candidate (both are counted by first-past-the-post voting method).

=== Political parties and candidates ===
According to the law enacted since 2014 half of the seats (225) are elected by party-list proportional representation (PLPR) with a minimum of 5% electoral threshold of number of votes that enable the party to get seats. The other half elected in 225 single-member constituencies (circuits, SMC) by first-past-the-post voting (plurality voting).

In the proportional part, candidates can be nominated only by political parties, and the lists of parties must include at least 200 and no more than 400 candidates; the list may also include candidates who are not members of the party, but their number should not exceed 50% of the number of candidates on the list. The party list of candidates should be divided into federal and regional parts, which include regional groups of candidates corresponding to the group of bordering federal subjects of Russia. The number of regional groups must be at least 35, and no more than fifteen candidates may be included in the federal part of the list of candidates. The regional parts of the party list should cover the entire territory of Russia.

In the majoritarian part, candidates can be nominated both by political parties and in the order of self-nomination. The political party must provide a list of candidates to the CEC, and the list must contain the name and number of the constituencies in which each candidate would run. Documents of candidates-self-nominees, unlike candidates from political parties, have to submit applications to District Election Commissions. For registration on the ballot list, the self-nominated candidate must collect at least 3% of the signatures of voters residing in the constituency, or at least 3,000 signatures if the constituency has less than 100,000 voters.

One and the same candidate can be nominated both in the party list and in the single-member constituency; however, in the case of their passage to the State Duma and the party list and in the single-member constituency, they would need to give up one of the places. They usually refuse the seat received on the party list, as in this case the party does not lose this seat and simply would pass it on to another candidate.

=== Seats distribution ===
Article 89 of the State Duma deputies election law stipulates the proportional algorithm (i.e. Hare quota) should be used to distribute 225 seats among parties who clear 5% electoral threshold in number of votes cast per given party. The rest of seats (225) are distributed according to the plurality voting, as it was stipulated by law at the time of the election. (Note: This is only true relative to the 2021 legislative election. Due to amendments done to the federal law, the election system may differ in the future.)

=== Changes in the electoral system ===
Owing to allegedly falling ratings of the ruling party, it was assumed that the party would try to reform the electoral system in order to maintain a majority in the new State Duma. In particular, it was assumed that the share of MPs elected by party lists could be reduced from 50% (225 seats) to 25% (112 or 113), and the rest would be elected in single-member constituencies by first-past-the-post voting, or elections on the party lists could be canceled altogether and all 450 seats would be elected in single-member constituencies; however, such assumptions were not justified, and the electoral system remained the same. In April 2021, an amendment was made to the Federal Law on Elections to the State Duma, increasing the federal part of the party list from 10 to 15 candidates.

== Observers ==
=== International ===
Putin's government restricted Organization for Security and Co-operation in Europe (OSCE) representatives from carrying out election monitoring activity; the Russian government cited COVID-19 concerns but did not elaborate on details. The OSCE reported that Russian authorities insisted on limiting a number of OSCE Office for Democratic Institutions and Human Rights observers to 50, and limiting the number of the OSCE Parliamentary Assembly observers to ten, even though the Russian government response to the COVID-19 pandemic had no restrictions that "would seem to prevent the deployment of a full election observation mission" at that time. It was the first time since 1993 that the OSCE would not participate in observing elections in Russia. The OSCE had earlier determined that 420 short-term and 80 long-term observers would be needed in order to reliably assess the process. Faced with major limitations on its freedom to observe, OSCE decided not to send a monitoring team at all. Only a symbolic delegation would be present.

In August 2021, the Russian government designated Golos (funded in part by USAID, NED, the US Government & Embassy) as a "foreign agent" under the Russian foreign agent law; the move hindered the group's ability to observe the election. According to TASS, 55 unnamed countries would send up to 249 delegates to observe the election. The Parliamentary Assembly of the Council of Europe announced that it would send a five-member mission to Moscow for the three days of the election.

=== Belarus ===
The National Assembly of Belarus has reportedly sent a delegation to Russia to observe the voting process. The group consisted of the same parliament members who are part to the Union State.

== Political parties ==
As of August 2021, there are 32 registered political parties in Russia. Parties represented in the State Duma, in which case seats must be obtained in the vote on the party list, parties that received more than 3% of the vote by party list in the previous elections, or parties that are represented at least in one of the regional parliaments, or also by party list, are allowed to contest in the elections without collecting signatures. Other parties need to collect 200,000 signatures if they have also held conventions and nominated candidates to participate in the elections. The official list of parties entitled to participate in the elections without collection of signatures was announced before the election. After the 2020 Russian regional elections, there are only 14 such parties.

=== Automatically on ballot ===
No. on ballot	Party	Abb.	Party leader	No. 1 in party list	Convention date	Political position	Ideologies	Party list	SMC	Notes
1	Communist Party of the Russian Federation	CPRF	Gennady Zyuganov	Gennady Zyuganov	24 June 2021	Left-wing to far-left	Communism / Marxism–Leninism / Social conservatism / Soviet patriotism	✓	✓	CEC registered the list of candidates on 24 July
2	Russian Ecological Party "The Greens"	The Greens	Andrey Nagibin	Andrey Nagibin	7 July 2021	Centre	Environmentalism / Green politics	✓	✓	CEC registered the list of candidates on 30 July
3	Liberal Democratic Party of Russia	LDPR	Vladimir Zhirinovsky	Vladimir Zhirinovsky	25 June 2021	Right-wing to far-right	Monarchism / Social conservatism / Economic interventionism / Right-wing populism / Russian ultranationalism	✓	✓	CEC registered the list of candidates on 21 July
4	New People	NP	Alexey Nechayev	Alexey Nechayev	4 July 2021	Centre-right	Communitarianism / Regionalism	✓	✓	CEC registered the list of candidates on 10 August
5	United Russia	UR	Dmitry Medvedev	Sergei Shoigu	19 June 2021	Big tent	Conservatism / Statism / Russian nationalism / Putinism	✓	✓	CEC registered the list of candidates on 12 August
6	A Just Russia — For Truth	SRZP	Sergey Mironov	Sergey Mironov	26 June 2021	Centre to centre-left	Social democracy / Democratic socialism / Social conservatism / Russian nationalism	✓	✓	CEC registered the list of candidates on 24 July
7	Yabloko	Yabloko	Nikolay Rybakov	Nikolay Rybakov	3–4 July 2021	Centre to centre-left	Social liberalism / Social democracy	✓	✓	CEC registered the list of candidates on 5 August
8	Party of Growth	PG	Boris Titov	Irina Mironova	7 July 2021	Centre-right	Liberal conservatism	✓	✓	CEC registered the list of candidates on 2 August
9	Russian Party of Freedom and Justice	RPFJ	Maksim Shevchenko	Maksim Shevchenko	3 July 2021	Centre-left	Social democracy / Nationalism / Federalism	✓	✓	CEC registered the list of candidates on 27 July
10	Communists of Russia	CR	Maxim Suraykin	Maxim Suraykin	30 June 2021	Far-left	Communism / Marxism–Leninism / Neo-Stalinism / Anti-revisionism	✓	✓	CEC registered the list of candidates on 23 July
11	Civic Platform	CP	Rifat Shaykhutdinov	Rifat Shaykhutdinov	3 July 2021	Centre-right	Economic liberalism / Liberal conservatism	✓	✓	CEC registered the list of candidates on 26 July
12	Green Alternative	GA	Ruslan Khvostov	Victoria Dayneko	25 June 2021	Centre-left	Green politics / Environmentalism	✓	✓	CEC registered the list of candidates on 2 August
13	Rodina	Rodina	Aleksey Zhuravlyov	Aleksey Zhuravlyov	26 June 2021	Far-right	Russian nationalism / National conservatism	✓	✓	CEC registered the list of candidates on 27 July
14	Russian Party of Pensioners for Social Justice	RPPSJ	Vladimir Burakov	Vladimir Burakov	29 June 2021	Centre	Pensioner interests	✓	✓	CEC registered the list of candidates on 2 August

=== Uninvolved parties ===
Party	Abb.	Party leader	No. 1 in party list	Convention date	Political position	Ideology	Party list	SMC	Notes
Russian All-People's Union	ROS	Sergey Baburin	Sergey Baburin	3 July 2021	Right-wing	Russian nationalism / National conservatism	✓	✓	Party failed to submit the necessary signatures and did not take part in the election

== Campaign ==
=== Party of Growth ===
On 19 December 2018, the Party of Growth became the first party to launch a campaign when its leader Boris Titov opened the party's "Election 2021" federal headquarters in Miass, Chelyabinsk Oblast. According to Titov, the party would focus on elections in single-mandate constituencies, not party lists. He said: "Today, no slogans, no 'locomotives', (Note: Political technology aimed at increasing the number of voters who vote for the list by attracting a candidate with a high political rating (most often governors and mayors of large cities). After winning, the candidate immediately refuses the position that they have been elected to. The "locomotive" then passes their mandate on to a party member who is usually less known to voters.) we can't win ... we can't cover the whole of Russia, so it's easier for us to focus on specific constituencies. We need real candidates who will be known on the ground. And the electorate who will know first of all the person, and not even the Party of Growth." The party would nominate about 40 candidates in single-member constituencies. According to the plan, deputies elected in the course of elections to municipal and regional legislative bodies prior to 2021 should form the election headquarters of the main candidates.

On 7 July 2020 a party convention was held in Moscow, at which the party program was approved, and governing bodies were elected. Boris Titov retained the post of party leader, while the posts of co-chairmen of the party were established. In addition to Titov, nine people became co-chairs: musician Sergey Shnurov, actor Nikolai Fomenko, former Minister of Labor and MP Oksana Dmitriyeva, former MP Sergey Stankevich, economist Yevgeny Kogan, journalist Alexander Lyubimov, businessman Ilya Sachkov, social entrepreneur Ksenia Bezuglova, and human rights activist Alexander Huruji.

On 30 September 2020, Titov said that the party list would be headed by Sergey Shnurov if he takes up the offer and the party approves.

=== United Russia ===
United Russia launched its campaign at the party convention on 23 November 2019. The convention identified priorities and key areas of work that should allow the party to maintain its position as the leading political force in Russia and win the 2021 election. Party leader Dmitry Medvedev said that he would head a commission to prepare a new election program for the party. In addition, a project office was established to prepare for the election. According to the party's General Council Secretary Andrey Turchak, United Russia would fight to preserve its constitutional majority, and intends to win at least 301 seats. According to sources from the party leadership, United Russia has assessed the work of its deputies in the State Duma. Based on this assessment, not all of them would be able to run in the upcoming election, and is assumed that about half of the faction would be made up of new deputies.

On 15 January 2020, Medvedev resigned from office of the Prime Minister of Russia. Current Prime Minister Mikhail Mishustin is not a member of United Russia or any other party; at the same time, Medvedev remains the party's leader. In July 2020, Turchak announced the start of preparations for the party's election program. Medvedev said the new version of the Constitution of Russia should be used as the basis for the election program. On 22 October 2020, it became known that the party leadership had identified the first group of candidates for single-member constituencies. This group includes 71 incumbent MPs, whom the party intends to nominate again in their constituencies. Among these MPs is the party's parliamentary leader Sergey Neverov.

On 19 June 2021, the party's pre-election congress was held in Moscow, at which the candidates and the party's program were approved. At the congress, President Vladimir Putin proposed the following five individuals for the party's federal list for the elections, among them Sergei Shoigu (Defence Minister), Sergey Lavrov (Foreign Minister), Denis Protsenko (head doctor of Russia's main coronavirus hospital), Yelena Shmelyova (co-chair of the All-Russia People's Front), and Anna Kuznetsova (Children's Rights Commissioner for the President of the Russian Federation). To the surprise of many analysts, Medvedev did not top the list. The party also campaigned in the self-proclaimed Donetsk People's Republic and Luhansk People's Republic in eastern Ukraine, where half a million Russian passports had been received by local residents.

==== United Russia primaries ====
From 24 to 30 May 2021, United Russia held primaries to select candidates for the election. These were the third legislative primaries held by the party since 2011 and the second open primaries in which all Russian citizens could participate. Electronic voting was used in the primaries due to the COVID-19 pandemic in Russia. A total of 7,624 candidates participated in the primaries, of which almost half were not party members. Of the 336 incumbent deputies from the party, only 237 applied to participate in the primaries.

=== Yabloko ===
On 14 and 15 December 2019, Yabloko held its party convention in Moscow. Elections of the party leadership, including its leader, were held during the convention. Nikolay Rybakov was elected the new leader of the party for the next four years. He said his main goal will be to transform the party for the 2021 election. Rybakov said: "We'll see Yabloko, where the candidates will be requested to prepare for the election campaign starting from Monday in practice. If you enter an election campaign late people do not have time to learn that there are candidates from Yabloko." Rybakov has stated that he expects to win approximately 10% of the electorate. When asked by a journalist if he is open to working with supporters of Alexei Navalny and in fact nominating some of his supporters as candidates, Rybakov replied: "We are open to conversation. We are discussing all this." On 3 July, Grigory Yavlinsky, the founder of the party, decided to not run for parliament, instead endorsing younger candidates. Yabloko was expected to nominate other famous opposition candidates such as Dmitry Gudkov and Andrei Pivovarov, along with many Navalny supporters.

In an early August interview with TV Rain, Grigory Yavlinsky denounced "Navalny's Politics" and his Smart Voting strategy. Yavlinsky also called on Navalny supporters to not vote for Yabloko. As a consequence, experts from Carnegie Moscow Center have stated that Yabloko has lost all chances at overcoming the 5% electoral threshold.

=== A Just Russia — For Truth ===
On 20 January 2021, Sergey Mironov announced the merger of A Just Russia, Patriots of Russia, and For Truth. A congress was held on 22 February, at which the three parties officially united into one and its leadership was elected. Mironov became the leader of the new party, while Zakhar Prilepin and Gennady Semigin (the leaders of the other two parties) were appointed co-chairmen. The new party is called the Socialist Party "A Just Russia — Patriots — For Truth", or simply A Just Russia — For Truth.

==== A Just Russia ====
On 24 September 2020, A Just Russia launched its election campaign at a meeting of the presidium of the central council of the party. According to party leader Sergey Mironov, he will carry out general management of the campaign, and the head of the election headquarters will be MP Valery Gartung.

==== For Truth ====
On 22 October 2020, at a meeting of the party's central committee, it was decided that party leader Zakhar Prilepin would head the party list of candidates for the election. Prilepin rejected speculation about his intention to run from a single-member constituency in the Nizhny Novgorod Oblast and said that he would run only as part of the federal list. Prilepin also said that Nikolai Starikov and Sergey Mikheev would also run only on the party list. Mikheev explained this decision by saying that it is more reasonable to nominate the most famous candidates on the party list, since candidates in single-member constituencies do not participate in debates.

=== New People ===
On 21 October 2020, party leader Alexey Nechaev announced that he would head the New People party list in the election. According to him, the party intends to nominate more than 200 candidates in single-member constituencies. According to Nechaev, the party expects to get 15–20% of the vote. According to the results of the 2020 regional elections, New People was named the most promising party of the so-called new parties which were registered in 2020 as well as one of the two non-parliamentary parties that has a chance to overcome the 5% barrier.

On 30 November 2020, it became known that political strategist Yevgeny Minchenko had been chosen as the head of the party's election headquarters. According to political commentators, Minchenko as the head of campaign significantly increases the party's chances of being elected to the State Duma, since he previously conducted successful election campaigns in some post-Soviet countries. On 21 December 2020, it was announced that the party intends to spend about 500 million rubles on its election campaign for the party list; for comparison, only the Liberal Democratic Party spent more than 500 million rubles in the previous election.

=== Communist Party of the Russian Federation ===
The Communist Party of the Russian Federation launched its campaign during the plenum of the central committee of the party on 24 October 2020. Party leader Gennady Zyuganov instructed to start developing an electoral program. According to the party's representative, the program would be less populist than in the 2016 election and more detailed for specific groups of voters. During the plenum, Zyuganov also proposed creating a new coalition, the Popular Front of the Left and Patriots.

On 14 December 2020, Deputy Chairman of the Central Committee of the party Yury Afonin said that the party intends to hold the next (non-election) convention in spring 2021. It is planned to elect the party leadership at the convention. Initially, it was planned that the convention would be held after the election in the fall of 2021. According to Afonin, it was decided to hold this convention earlier because "the campaign will be tense, and attempts will be made to beat the candidates".

=== Green Alternative ===
Green Alternative launched its campaign on 22 November 2020 at a party board meeting. According to party leader Ruslan Khvostov, the party would focus on social issues, health care, science, and protection of minority rights, alongside environmental issues.

=== Russian Party of Pensioners for Social Justice ===
The Russian Party of Pensioners for Social Justice launched its campaign on 7 December 2020 at a meeting of the party's presidium of the central council. According to some experts, the Party of Pensioners is one of two non-parliamentary parties that have a chance to overcome the 5% barrier.

=== Liberal Democratic Party of Russia ===
The Liberal Democratic Party of Russia launched its campaign during the party's convention on 14 December 2020. The party leadership was elected at the convention, and Vladimir Zhirinovsky was re-elected as its leader. Owing to the COVID-19 pandemic, the convention was held in a truncated format. Nevertheless, it became one of the few Russian political parties and the only parliamentary political party to hold a convention despite the pandemic.

=== Russian Party of Freedom and Justice ===
On 28 March 2021, the convention of the Communist Party of Social Justice was held, at which political strategist Konstantin Rykov was elected as the new chairman of the central committee of the party. At the same congress, it was decided to rename the party to the Russian Party of Freedom and Justice. On 31 March, it was announced that the party list would be headed by journalist Maxim Shevchenko.

=== Russian Ecological Party "The Greens" ===
The Russian Ecological Party "The Greens" launched its campaign on 15 May 2021 during the party's convention. At the convention, a decision was made to start preparing for the election. The congress also included elections to the party's governing bodies, and Andrey Nagibin was elected its new leader.

== Opinion polls ==
United Russia CPRF LDPR SRZP New People

=== Forecasts ===
In the run-up to the elections, some organizations have made forecasts of the election results.

Fieldwork date	Polling firm	UR	CPRF	LDPR	SRZP	NP	RPPSJ	Yabloko	CR	Rodina	PG	Greens	CP	RPFJ	GA	Lead	Turnout
13 September	FoRGO	42–46%	17–19%	11–13%	7–9%	3.5–5%	3.5–5%	>3%	—							23–29%	—
13 September	FPP	41–44%	18–22%	10–13%	7–9%	3.9–6.1%	3.8–5.9%	—								19–26%	50%
9 September	INSOMAR	45.1%	18.6%	12.0%	8.1%	5.2%	3.2%	3.1%	0.5%	0.7%	0.2%	1.2%	0.1%	0.4%	0.2%	26.5%	50–52%
9 September	WCIOM	42.0% (41–44%)	19.0% (18–22%)	11.0% (10–13%)	8.0% (7–9%)	5.0% (4–6%)	4.0%	3.0%	1.0%	1.0%	0.4%	3.0%	0.04%	1.0%	0.3%	23.0% (19–26%)	48–51%
18 September 2016	Election result	54.20%	13.34%	13.14%	6.81% (Note: Results for JR (6.22%) and PoR (0.59%) in the 2016 election.)	New	1.73%	1.99%	2.27%	1.51%	1.29%	0.76%	0.22%	DNP	New	40.64%	47.88%

== Controversy ==
=== Irregularities ===
The election was marred by multiple episodes of systemic fraud. Multiple episodes of ballot-box stuffing and other forms of fraud were recorded in photographs and video recordings, many of which circulated widely on Russian social media. In some regions, episodes of carousel voting (groups of voters casting multiple ballots at different polling stations) were reported. There were also reports of clashes between poll workers and election monitors.

Ella Pamfilova, head of the CEC, said that the government's commission had invalidated some 25,830 ballots but insisted at a press conference with Putin that the complaints of fraud were "minimal as ever"; outside analysts identified fraud on a much broader scale. After the election, the independent Russian election-monitoring organization Golos said that there were violations during the voting procedure which led to "significantly distorted" results that cast doubt on the "veracity of the results" officially reported by the CEC. Golos said it had received about 5,000 reports of possible voter violations.

Physicist and independent Russian election analyst Sergei Shpilkin conducted a statistical analysis of anomalies in the voting data, concluding that massive fraud was a major factor in United Russia's victory and over 14 million votes were added artificially. Shpilkin estimated that United Russia would have likely received around 31–33% of votes, rather than nearly half of the vote as officially reported, and United Russia would have lost its majority in the State Duma without voting fraud. Electronic vote accounted for 4% of overall votes and was decisive for a number of Duma seats, especially in Moscow. Shpilikin also estimated that nationwide voter turnout was probably around 38%, rather than 52% as officially reported. Statistical analysis by the Complexity Science Hub Vienna also indicate massive fraud, with clear statistical signs for voter rigging and ballot-stuffing; voter turnout was rather around 30%. A machine learning model applied to electoral data also indicates the mediocre quality of election results registration.

There were reports on members of election committees casting ballots for voters, and removal of observers by police during counting. With the election taking three days, there were numerous reports of members of election committees returning to polling stations at late hours, although the polling stations were supposed to be closed.

==== Remote voting ====
===== Absentee ballots =====
According to Article 83 of Federal Law 20, individuals unable to come to the polling stations are allowed to vote remotely outside polling station. Such individuals are required to make a request for a remote voting, then members of election committees would come to locations specified by such individuals, typically to their home addresses, in order to collect the vote. There were multiple reports on members of election committees compiling such requests themselves. The overall number of requests for remote voting became inflated. There were reports for a single district in Saratov of 5,200 votes collected remotely for 3,700 votes collected at polling stations.

A remote voting procedure takes from 5 to 10 minutes, because voter's ID must be verified and due to some paperwork, and some extra time is needed for reaching the next location. One mobile group of members of election committee usually collects about 20 votes in a single trip. A number of observers per polling station is limited by law. In order to get rid of observers, a few mobile groups of members of election committee would depart almost simultaneously. The last mobile groups would often depart without observers and would return in just two hours with over 100 ballots, which is a clear indication of fraud. Тhis violation took place on multiple polling stations. Golos has reported over 700 possible violations related to this type of fraud.

===== Electronic voting =====
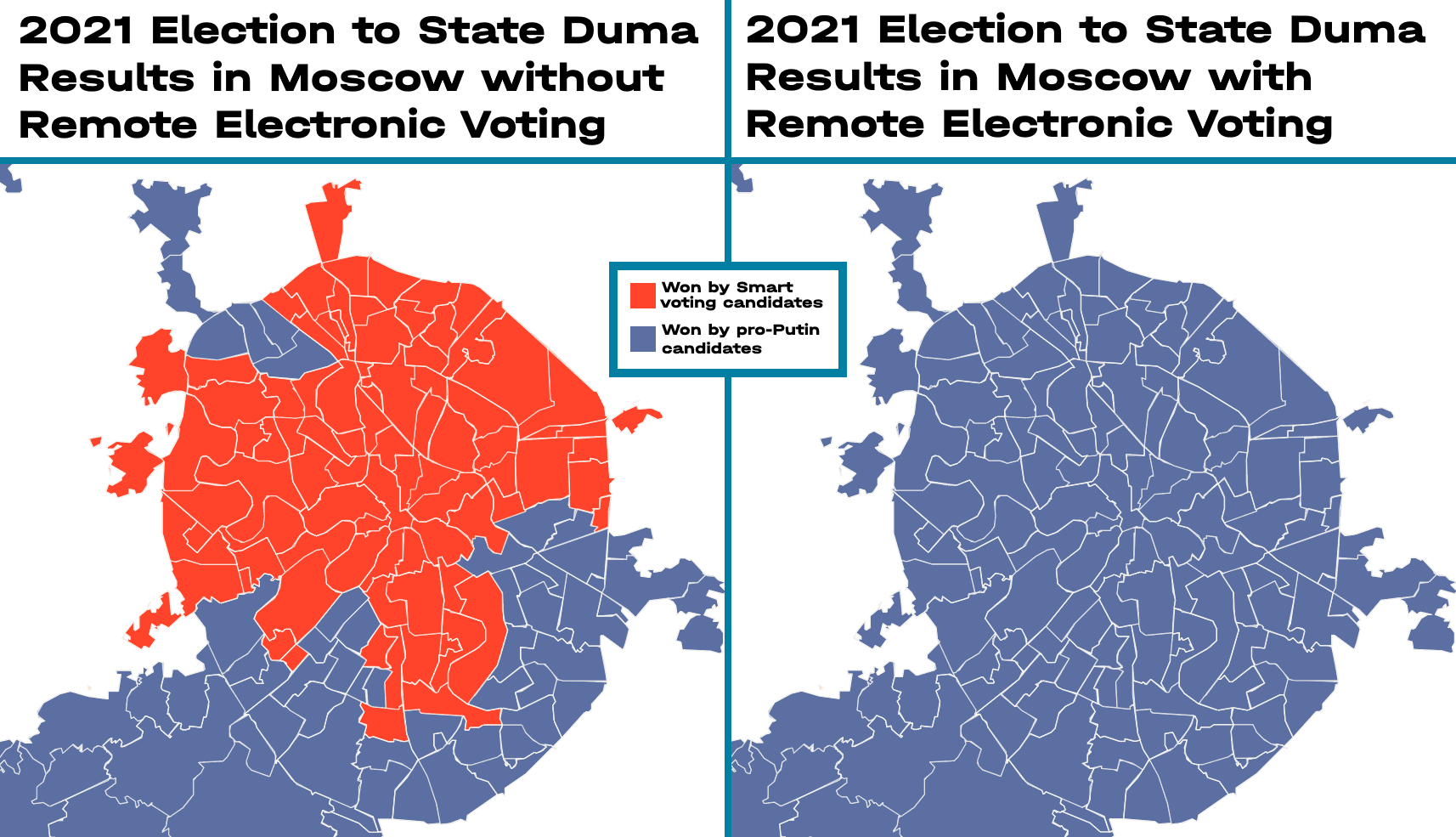
2021 election to the Moscow Duma with and without Remote Electronic Voting

For the first time, the highly-controversial remote electronic voting, or E-voting, was introduced in 2019 Moscow City Duma election. On 17 March 2021, the CEC has announced that at least six E-voting elections, both federal and municipal, would be held in regions, including Moscow. E-voting was heavily used on the election days in Moscow. Even though initially considered convenient for casting votes after the election, E-voting was met with severe public criticism that followed by accusations of rigging election results, and the opposition parties demanding to abandon it and amend the outcome.

=== Candidate duplicates ===
While non-systemic opposition was largely eliminated from the elections, those candidates (mostly of systemic opposition) who were allowed to participate were targeted by various semi-legal intimidation or confusion techniques. The one includes "doppelganger candidates", where a person of similar look and surname was put on the same ballot in order to confuse voters. More than 20 doppelgangers were reported.

=== Spoiler and fake parties ===
Putin's administrations has engineered an approach to draw away votes from seemingly genuine systemic-opposition parties and spread them among many less-known but politically crippled spoilers in order to secure the ruling party dominance. Communists of Russia, a party created in 2009 that took part in both the 2016 and 2021 legislative elections, was described as a spoiler whose purpose is to split votes from the CPRF.

Similar logos of parties

Communists of Russia logo

CPRF logo

== Exit polls ==
Date	Poll source	UR	CPRF	LDPR	SRZP	NP	RPPSJ	CR	Yabloko	Greens	Rodina	PG	RPFJ	GA	CP	Lead
19 September 2021	Insomar (Note: It is a contractor to the Government of Moscow according to the company's portfolio.)	45.2%	21.0%	8.7%	7.9%	4.7%	3.6%	1.9%	1.6%	0.9%	0.8%	0.6%	0.6%	0.3%	0.3%	24.2%
18–19 September 2021	CIPKR	41%	27%	11%	5%	4%	3%	0%	1%	–	1%	0%	2%	0%	0%	14%

== Results ==
Party	Party-list			Constituency			Total seats	+/–
Party	Votes	%	Seats	Votes	%	Seats	Total seats	+/–
United Russia	28,064,200	50.88	126	25,201,048	47.46	198	324	–19
Communist Party	10,660,669	19.33	48	8,984,506	16.92	9	57	+15
Liberal Democratic Party	4,252,252	7.71	19	3,234,113	6.09	2	21	–18
A Just Russia — For Truth	4,201,744	7.62	19	4,882,518	9.19	8	27	+4
New People	2,997,744	5.43	13	2,684,082	5.05	0	13	New
Russian Party of Pensioners for Social Justice	1,381,915	2.51	0	1,969,986	3.71	0	0	0
Yabloko	753,268	1.37	0	1,091,837	2.06	0	0	0
Communists of Russia	715,621	1.30	0	1,639,774	3.09	0	0	0
Russian Ecological Party "The Greens"	512,418	0.93	0	541,289	1.02	0	0	0
Rodina	450,449	0.82	0	829,303	1.56	1	1	0
Russian Party of Freedom and Justice	431,530	0.78	0	372,867	0.70	0	0	New
Green Alternative	357,870	0.65	0	120,137	0.23	0	0	New
Party of Growth	291,465	0.53	0	515,020	0.97	1	1	+1
Civic Platform	86,964	0.16	0	386,663	0.73	1	1	0
Independents				646,950	1.22	5	5	+4
Total	55,158,109	100.00	225	53,100,093	100.00	225	450	0
Valid votes	55,158,109	97.92		53,100,093	96.52			
Invalid/blank votes	1,171,581	2.08		1,913,578	3.48			
Total votes	56,329,690	100.00		55,013,671	100.00			
Registered voters/turnout	109,204,662	51.58		108,231,085	50.83			
Source: CEC, CEC

=== By region ===

Region	Total seats	Seats won								
Region	Total seats	UR	CPRF	SRZP	LDPR	NP	Rodina	PG	CP	Ind.
Adygea	1	0	0	0	0	0	0	0	0	1
Altai Krai	4	3	1	0	0	0	0	0	0	0
Altai Republic	1	1	0	0	0	0	0	0	0	0
Amur Oblast	1	1	0	0	0	0	0	0	0	0
Arkhangelsk Oblast	2	2	0	0	0	0	0	0	0	0
Astrakhan Oblast	1	1	0	0	0	0	0	0	0	0
Bashkortostan	6	5	0	0	0	0	0	0	1	0
Belgorod Oblast	2	2	0	0	0	0	0	0	0	0
Bryansk Oblast	2	2	0	0	0	0	0	0	0	0
Buryatia	1	1	0	0	0	0	0	0	0	0
Chechnya	1	1	0	0	0	0	0	0	0	0
Chelyabinsk Oblast	5	4	0	1	0	0	0	0	0	0
Chukotka	1	1	0	0	0	0	0	0	0	0
Chuvashia	2	1	0	1	0	0	0	0	0	0
Republic of Crimea	3	2	0	0	0	0	0	0	0	1
Dagestan	3	3	0	0	0	0	0	0	0	0
Ingushetia	1	1	0	0	0	0	0	0	0	0
Irkutsk Oblast	4	3	1	0	0	0	0	0	0	0
Ivanovo Oblast	2	2	0	0	0	0	0	0	0	0
Jewish Autonomous Oblast	1	1	0	0	0	0	0	0	0	0
Kabardino-Balkaria	1	1	0	0	0	0	0	0	0	0
Kaliningrad Oblast	2	2	0	0	0	0	0	0	0	0
Kalmykia	1	1	0	0	0	0	0	0	0	0
Kaluga Oblast	2	2	0	0	0	0	0	0	0	0
Kamchatka Krai	1	1	0	0	0	0	0	0	0	0
Karachay-Cherkessia	1	1	0	0	0	0	0	0	0	0
Karelia	1	1	0	0	0	0	0	0	0	0
Kemerovo Oblast	4	4	0	0	0	0	0	0	0	0
Khabarovsk Krai	2	2	0	0	0	0	0	0	0	0
Khakassia	1	1	0	0	0	0	0	0	0	0
Khanty–Mansi Autonomous Okrug	2	2	0	0	0	0	0	0	0	0
Kirov Oblast	2	2	0	0	0	0	0	0	0	0
Komi Republic	1	0	1	0	0	0	0	0	0	0
Kostroma Oblast	1	1	0	0	0	0	0	0	0	0
Krasnodar Krai	8	8	0	0	0	0	0	0	0	0
Krasnoyarsk Krai	4	4	0	0	0	0	0	0	0	0
Kurgan Oblast	1	1	0	0	0	0	0	0	0	0
Kursk Oblast	2	2	0	0	0	0	0	0	0	0
Leningrad Oblast	3	3	0	0	0	0	0	0	0	0
Lipetsk Oblast	2	2	0	0	0	0	0	0	0	0
Magadan Oblast	1	1	0	0	0	0	0	0	0	0
Mari El	1	0	1	0	0	0	0	0	0	0
Mordovia	1	1	0	0	0	0	0	0	0	0
Moscow	15	11	0	1	0	0	0	0	0	3
Moscow Oblast	11	11	0	0	0	0	0	0	0	0
Murmansk Oblast	1	1	0	0	0	0	0	0	0	0
Nenets Autonomous Okrug	1	1	0	0	0	0	0	0	0	0
Nizhny Novgorod Oblast	5	5	0	0	0	0	0	0	0	0
North Ossetia–Alania	1	1	0	0	0	0	0	0	0	0
Novgorod Oblast	1	1	0	0	0	0	0	0	0	0
Novosibirsk Oblast	4	3	0	1	0	0	0	0	0	0
Omsk Oblast	3	1	2	0	0	0	0	0	0	0
Orenburg Oblast	3	3	0	0	0	0	0	0	0	0
Oryol Oblast	1	1	0	0	0	0	0	0	0	0
Penza Oblast	2	2	0	0	0	0	0	0	0	0
Perm Krai	4	4	0	0	0	0	0	0	0	0
Primorsky Krai	3	3	0	0	0	0	0	0	0	0
Pskov Oblast	1	1	0	0	0	0	0	0	0	0
Rostov Oblast	7	7	0	0	0	0	0	0	0	0
Ryazan Oblast	2	2	0	0	0	0	0	0	0	0
Saint Petersburg	8	6	0	1	0	0	0	1	0	0
Sakha	1	0	1	0	0	0	0	0	0	0
Sakhalin Oblast	1	1	0	0	0	0	0	0	0	0
Samara Oblast	5	3	2	0	0	0	0	0	0	0
Saratov Oblast	4	4	0	0	0	0	0	0	0	0
Sevastopol	1	1	0	0	0	0	0	0	0	0
Smolensk Oblast	2	1	0	0	1	0	0	0	0	0
Stavropol Krai	4	4	0	0	0	0	0	0	0	0
Sverdlovsk Oblast	7	7	0	0	0	0	0	0	0	0
Tambov Oblast	2	1	0	0	0	0	1	0	0	0
Tatarstan	6	6	0	0	0	0	0	0	0	0
Tomsk Oblast	2	1	0	0	1	0	0	0	0	0
Tula Oblast	2	2	0	0	0	0	0	0	0	0
Tuva	1	1	0	0	0	0	0	0	0	0
Tver Oblast	2	2	0	0	0	0	0	0	0	0
Tyumen Oblast	2	2	0	0	0	0	0	0	0	0
Udmurtia	2	2	0	0	0	0	0	0	0	0
Ulyanovsk Oblast	2	2	0	0	0	0	0	0	0	0
Vladimir Oblast	2	2	0	0	0	0	0	0	0	0
Volgograd Oblast	4	4	0	0	0	0	0	0	0	0
Vologda Oblast	2	2	0	0	0	0	0	0	0	0
Voronezh Oblast	4	4	0	0	0	0	0	0	0	0
Yamalo-Nenets Autonomous Okrug	1	1	0	0	0	0	0	0	0	0
Yaroslavl Oblast	2	0	0	2	0	0	0	0	0	0
Zabaykalsky Krai	2	1	0	1	0	0	0	0	0	0
Party list	225	126	48	19	19	13	0	0	0	0
Russia	450	324	57	27	21	13	1	1	1	5

== Reactions ==
=== Domestic ===
Nikolai Bondarenko, Saratov City Duma MP from the CPRF, vocal critic of the ruling party, and YouTube blogger, stated that the outcome was simply "rewritten" to the benefit of the candidate of the United Russia he ran against. He also said that his fellow allies were jailed and police has otherwise harassed them.

In a Levada Center poll in October 2021, 23.7% respondents described the elections as "certainly not honest", and 21.4% as "likely not honest".

==== Protests ====
Protests against alleged large-scale electoral fraud began in September 2021. The CPRF stated that it did not recognize the results of electronic voting in Moscow after several of its candidates were suddenly beaten by pro-government candidates. Party leader Zyuganov called on supporters "to defend the election results like the Podolsk cadets defended Moscow." The Moscow mayoral office denied the party's requests to hold protests from the 20th, citing COVID-19 restrictions. Sergei Udaltsov (the coordinator of the Left Front Sergei Udaltsov) and Nikolai Zubrilin (head of the CPRF fraction in the Moscow City Duma) were detained by the police.

=== International ===
The Ministry of Foreign Affairs of Georgia condemned Russia for conducting elections in Abkhazia and Tskhinvali, which are occupied by Russia and referred to as the occupied territories of Georgia but internationally recognized as part of Georgia.

The United States Department of State has stated that the election proceedings were neither free nor fair, and does not recognize results of the election that took place in the disputed territory of Crimea.

The British foreign ministry stated that the elections "represent a serious step back for democratic freedoms in Russia" and that measures by Russian authorities "to marginalise civil society, silence independent media and exclude genuine opposition candidates from participating" undermined political plurality and Russia's international commitments.
