= Anatoly Ivanov (politician, born 1960) =

Russian politician (born 1960)

- Анатолий Иванов
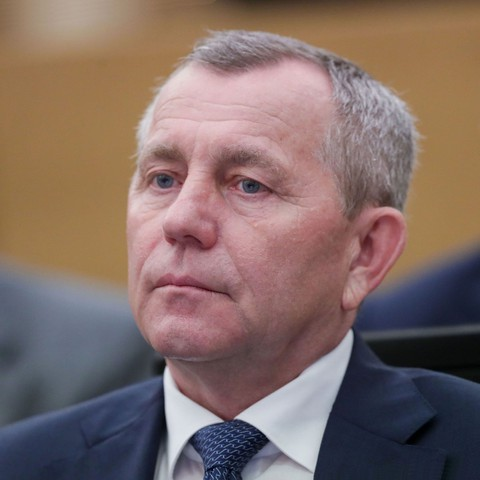

Member of the State Duma
- Incumbent
- Assumed office 5 June 2024
- Preceded by: Elena Yampolskaya

Personal details
- Born: 7 May 1960 (age 65) Utkino, Tatar Autonomous Soviet Socialist Republic
- Party: United Russia

Anatoly Petrovich Ivanov (Russian: Анатолий Петрович Иванов, romanized: Anatolij Petrovič Ivanov, born 7 May 1960) is a Russian politician who has been a member of the State Duma since 2025.

== See also ==
- 8th State Duma
