= Dmitry Kuznetsov (politician) =

Russian politician

Dmitry Kuznetsov MP
- Дмитрий Кузнецов
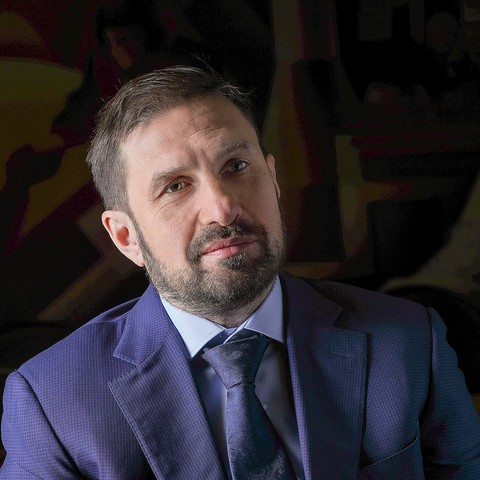

Member of the State Duma (Party List Seat)
- Incumbent
- Assumed office 20 October 2021

Personal details
- Born: 5 March 1975 (age 51) Moscow, RSFSR, USSR
- Party: A Just Russia — For Truth
- Education: Moscow State University

Dmitry Vadimovich Kuznetsov (Russian: Дмитрий Вадимович Кузнецов; born 5 March 1975, Moscow) is a Russian political figure and a deputy of the 8th State Duma.

In 1997, Kuznetsov graduated from Moscow State University. From 1997 to 2015, he was engaged in marketing and worked as a producer in showbusiness. He also worked at the Media Star company founded by Yuri Aizenshpis. In June 2019, he joined the All-Russia People's Front. In 2020, Kuznetsov was appointed secretary of the central committee of the For Truth party initiated by writer Zakhar Prilepin. In 2021, the party was merged with the parties A Just Russia and Patriots of Russia. Since October 2021, he has served as deputy of the 8th State Duma, having received the mandate previously declined by Prilepin following the 2021 Russian legislative election.

After 2022 Russian invasion of Ukraine, Kuznetsov declared the party's plans to open branches in Kherson and Lugansk. In his interview, he also mentioned that Russia needs to be "self-cleaned".

In November 2023, he made a proposal to Christian parliamentarians from different countries to unite for the protection of traditional values and peacemaking efforts around the world.”

Together with parliamentarians and public figures from Europe, Russia, Latin America and Africa, he created the organizing committee of the “World Christian Association of Parliamentarians" and the “Commission on Value-Based Humanitarian Cooperation and Interreligious Dialogue BRICS+” for international cooperation based on common spiritual and moral values.

As part of the work of the organizing committee of the World Christian Association of Parliamentarians, he organized a humanitarian medical mission to help refugee children and displaced persons in African countries and visiting prisoners.

In the spring of 2023, together with the office of the Ukrainian Ombudsman, he started mutual verification of the conditions of the captives and asked the President of the Russian Federation to assist in the issue of exchange of civilian prisoners.

Dmitry Kuznetsov created the program “ MPs' Headquarters for Assistance to Mobilized Soldiers and their Families”. The essence of the program is to protect the rights of soldiers and solve problems with payments, documents, social protection, necessary medical care and other. Kuznetsov received more than 10000 requests. More than 50 thousand people received help.

Kuznetsov became the victim of a hoax when he added the fictional pro-Kremlin poet Gennady Rakitin as a "friend" on VKontakte.
