= Gennady Rakitin =

Fictional Nazi Poet Created by Anti-Putin activists

- Геннадий Ракитин
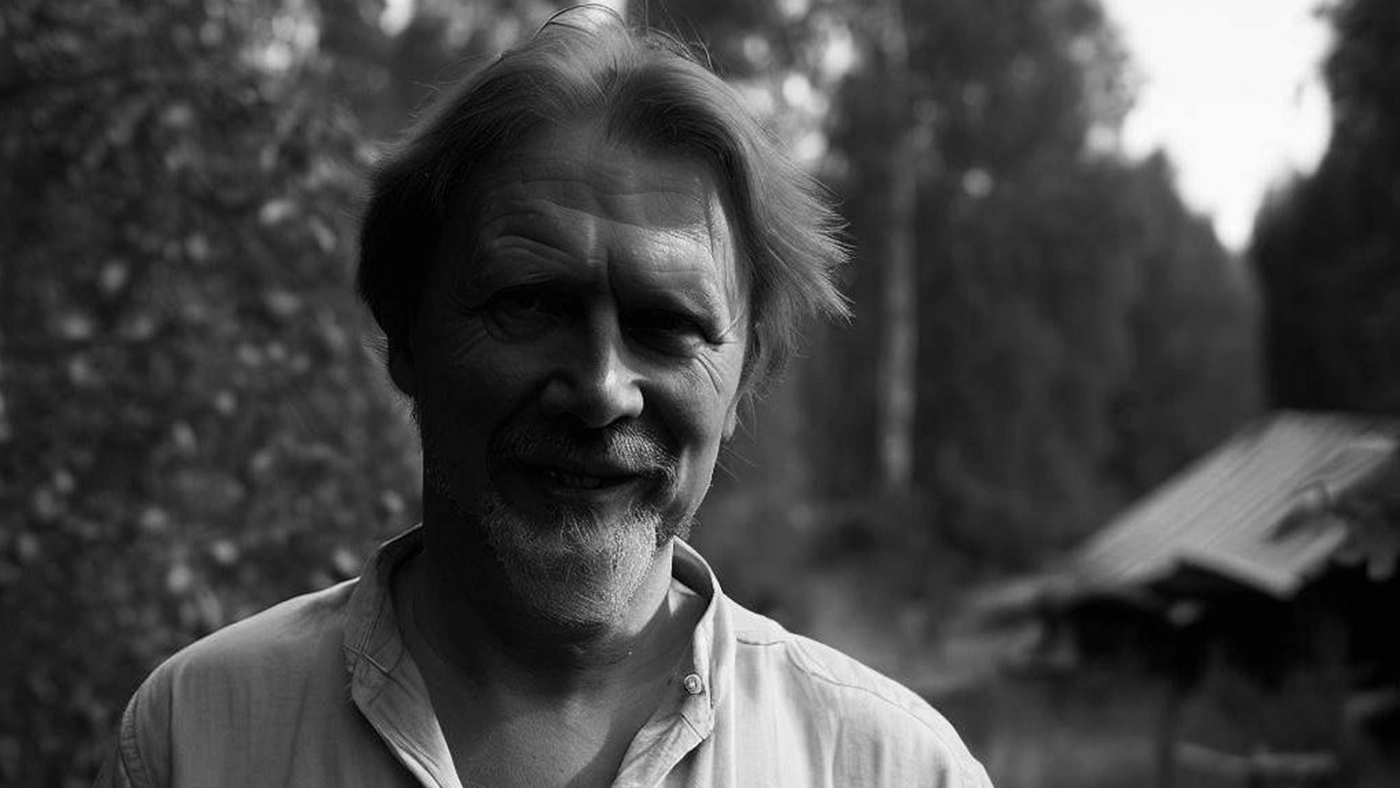
- AI-generated image presented as being the non-existent poet Rakitin
- Born: 1975 (age 50–51)
- Occupation: fictional Russian poet
- Years active: from 2023

Gennady Rakitin (Russian: Геннадий Ракитин) is a fictional Russian poet created as a hoax by an anonymous group of anti-Putin Russian exiles led by Andrey Zakharov. In mid-2023, they began to translate Nazi propagandistic poems, written in the 1930s and 1940s in Nazi Germany to celebrate Nazism, fascism, and to honor Adolf Hitler, into Russian with minimal changes and published those poems as patriotic verses celebrating Russia's war in Ukraine and the Russian leader and President Vladimir Putin on a Russian social media platform. The barely disguised Nazi poems drew significant attention in Russia, duping people from all walks of society that include Kremlin officials and nearly a hundred State Duma deputies and even winning some influential poetry competition awards. In June 2024, after finally giving up on Russian authorities getting the message, the Russian exiles revealed that Gennady Rakitin was a hoax and the Z poems were translated from old Nazi poems. According to the participants, this hoax was created to debunk Putin's claim of anti-Nazism in the Russian invasion of Ukraine and to showcase similarities between Putinism and Nazism.

== Hoax ==
The Russian anti-Putin exiles created a 49-year-old poet named Gennady Rakitin with his black-and-white image created with AI. Gennady Rakitin was set as a graduate of the Philology Department at Moscow State University. In mid-2023, they published 18 poems on VKontakte to "pay tribute" to the "heroic sacrifices" of Russian soldiers in the Russian invasion of Ukraine and the "great leader" Vladimir Putin. In fact, these verses were translations of Nazi Germany's propaganda written in the 1930s and 1940s with minimal changes such as replacing "Germany", "Hitler" and "nameless Storm Troopers" with "Russia", "Putin" and "nameless Wagner Group mercenaries".

The Leader

You are like a gardener in his own garden,
Reaping the fruits of heavy labor.
The people rejoice, the flags are raised high,
And time quietly comes into its own.

— Written using a translation of the poem “Führer” by the Nazi and antisemite Eberhard Möller. The post was accompanied by a photograph of Vladimir Putin.

The poem "Leader", which was posted with Putin's masculine picture, is actually "Fuhrer", an antisemitic Nazi propagandistic work written by Eberhard Wolfgang Möller in 1938. Möller had joined the Nazi Party even before Hitler came to power.

Other Nazi authors whose works were adapted by the group include Herybert Menzel, a Sturmabteilung member who joined the Nazi Party in 1933, and songwriter Heinrich Anacker.

== Impact ==
The verses were reposted on VKontakte by many. About 100 State Duma deputies, 30 senators, and several Kremlin officials were taken in and added Gennady Rakitin as "friends". These include State Duma deputies Dmitry Kuznetsov and Nina Ostanina, senators Dmitry Rogozin and Andrey Klishas, Putin's cultural advisor Elena Yampolskaya, and pro-Kremlin "war correspondent" Yuri Kotenok.

In June 2024, one of Rakitin's poems won a prize at an All-Russian Patriotic Poetry Competition held by the Kaluga branch of the Union of Writers of Russia, reaching the semifinals in the "Poems about war and defenders of the Motherland" category. Another poem won the Tvardovsky Patriotic Poetry Competition.

== See also ==
- Ruscism
