= Elena Yampolskaya =

Russian theatre critic

- Елена Ямпольская
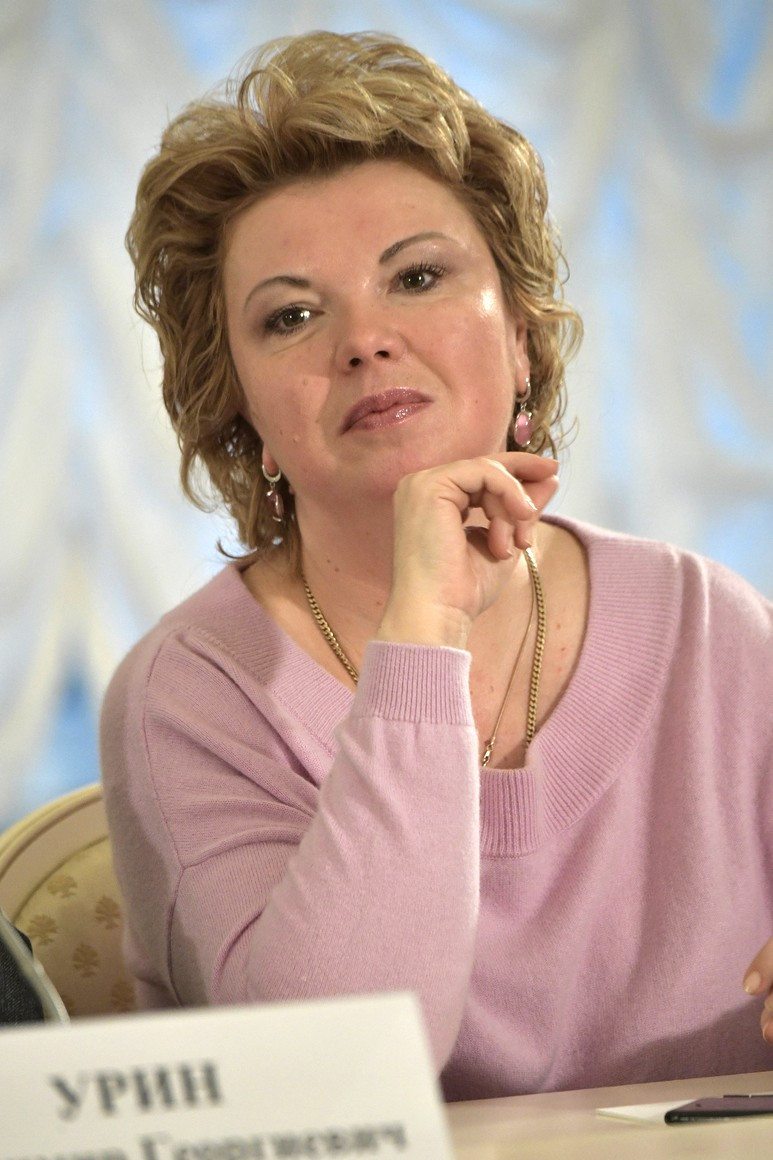
- Yampolskaya in 2018

Adviser to the President of Russia
- Incumbent
- Assumed office 14 May 2024

Member of the State Duma (Party List Seat)
- In office 5 October 2016 – 21 May 2024
- Succeeded by: Anatoly Ivanov

Personal details
- Born: 20 June 1971 (age 55) Moscow, Russian SFSR, Soviet Union
- Party: United Russia
- Education: Russian Academy of Theatre Arts
- Occupation: Journalist

Elena Alexandrovna Yampolskaya (Russian: Еле́на Алекса́ндровна Ямпо́льская; born 20 June 1971) is a Russian politician, journalist, writer and theater critic. She is a member of the State Duma of the Federal Assembly of the Russian Federation of the VII and VIII convocations since 2016. Yampolskaya is the Chair of the Committee for Culture of the State Duma of the Federal Assembly of the Russian Federation since 25 July 2018. She served as Chief editor of the newspaper Culture (2011–2019).

Advisor to the President of the Russian Federation since 14 May 2024.

Yampolskaya became the victim of a hoax when she added the fictional pro-Kremlin poet Gennady Rakitin as a "friend" on VKontakte.

== Sanctions ==
She was sanctioned by the UK government on 11 March 2022 in relation to the Russo-Ukrainian War.
