= Podolsk cadets =

Cadets of Podolsk Artillery

Podolsk cadets are cadets of the Podolsk artillery and infantry military schools who defended Moscow in October 1941 during the battle for Moscow at the starting period of the Great Patriotic War as part of World War II.

== History ==
In total, before the beginning of the Great Patriotic War, more than 3,500 cadets were taking their military training in Podolsk artillery and infantry schools. They were instructed to become excellent commanders with sufficient expertise in the art of war. In October 1941, there was a real danger of Moscow being captured by a breakthrough attack of German tank troops. The weakest line of defense was near the town of Mozhaisk to the South-West from the Soviet capital. The total length of the line was 220 kilometers, and due to its vast expanse the fortification construction was not completed. It was necessary to buy 5 to 7 days to relocate the military reserves of the General Headquarters.

== Advanced guard ==
On October 5, 1941, an advanced detachment was formed from Podolsk cadets. Their task was to resist and slow down the advancement of the enemy forces until the newly formed troops of the school arrived at the Ilyinskoye line of defense off Maloyaroslavets. On October 6, the cadets engaged the regiment of the 57th motorized corps of the Wehrmacht. After five days (October 6–10) of bloody fights, having spent almost all the ammo, the vanguard retreated to the village of Iliynskoye, where the main forces of the two schools had already been deployed. No more than a third of the cadets of the advanced detachment survived, yet they destroyed up to 20 tanks, about 10 armored vehicles and several hundred enemy soldiers.

== Borovsk battle ==
On October 11, Germans attempted to storm the Ilyinskoye line and organized an attack to quickly capture the town of Borovsk. From 12 to 20 October, there were fierce battles, many cadets sacrificed their lives in an attempt to slow down the advancement of the invaders. On October 20, the remaining cadets, having received orders from the Headquarters of the 43rd army, withdrew to rejoin the main troops. The surviving cadets of the Podolsk infantry school were relocated to the Ivanovo region, where another infantry school was organized in the city of Shuya. The Podolsk artillery school was evacuated to Bukhara in the Uzbek SSR.

In the battles at the Ilyinskoye line, Russian sources claim the Podolsk cadets killed about 5,000 German soldiers and officers, and disabled about 100 tanks. The order of the Headquarters was fulfilled at the cost of thousands of lives. According to some reports, about 2,500 cadets were killed in October, 1941, while alternative sources claim that only one out of ten of the 3,500 soldiers of the cadet regiment survived. Nevertheless, it made it possible for the Headquarters to relocate additional military units and weapons from the eastern regions of the country to the frontline and finally defend the capital.

== Memory ==
=== Cadet ribbon ===
On April 27, 2013, the "Cadet ribbon" memorial campaign was launched. The initiators were students of a gymnasium in Podolsk. The cadet ribbon is a piece of satin cloth 25 cm long and 3.5 cm wide. The ribbon has 5 equal-width alternating stripes — 3 green and 2 red ones.

=== Commemorative medal ===
On October 3, 2016, the all-Russian public organization of Veterans of the Armed forces together with the Ministry of Defense established a commemorative medal dedicated to the 75th anniversary of the feat of Podolsk cadets.

== Literature ==
1. Lev Mihail Andreevich "Partisan trails"// Author's translation from the Hebrew By I. Gurevich. - Moscow: Sov. writer, 1958
2. Andrey Sidorchik. Feat of the "red Junkers". How Podolsk cadets saved Moscow (Rus.) // AIF : Gazeta. - 2016. - October 6. Retrieved 2020-11-07
3. Pankov D. D. Podolsky cadets in the battle for Moscow. - M.: publishing house "Moskovia", 2008. Retrieved 2020-11-07
4. Postnikov S. Ivanovich Shuisky infantry // In distant garrisons. - M.: "Polygon-press", 2004. Retrieved 2020-11-07
5. Training of military personnel during the war in the Central Asian military district. Retrieved 2020-11-07
