= Andrey Klishas =

Russian politician and jurist

Andrey Klishas Андрей Александрович Клишас
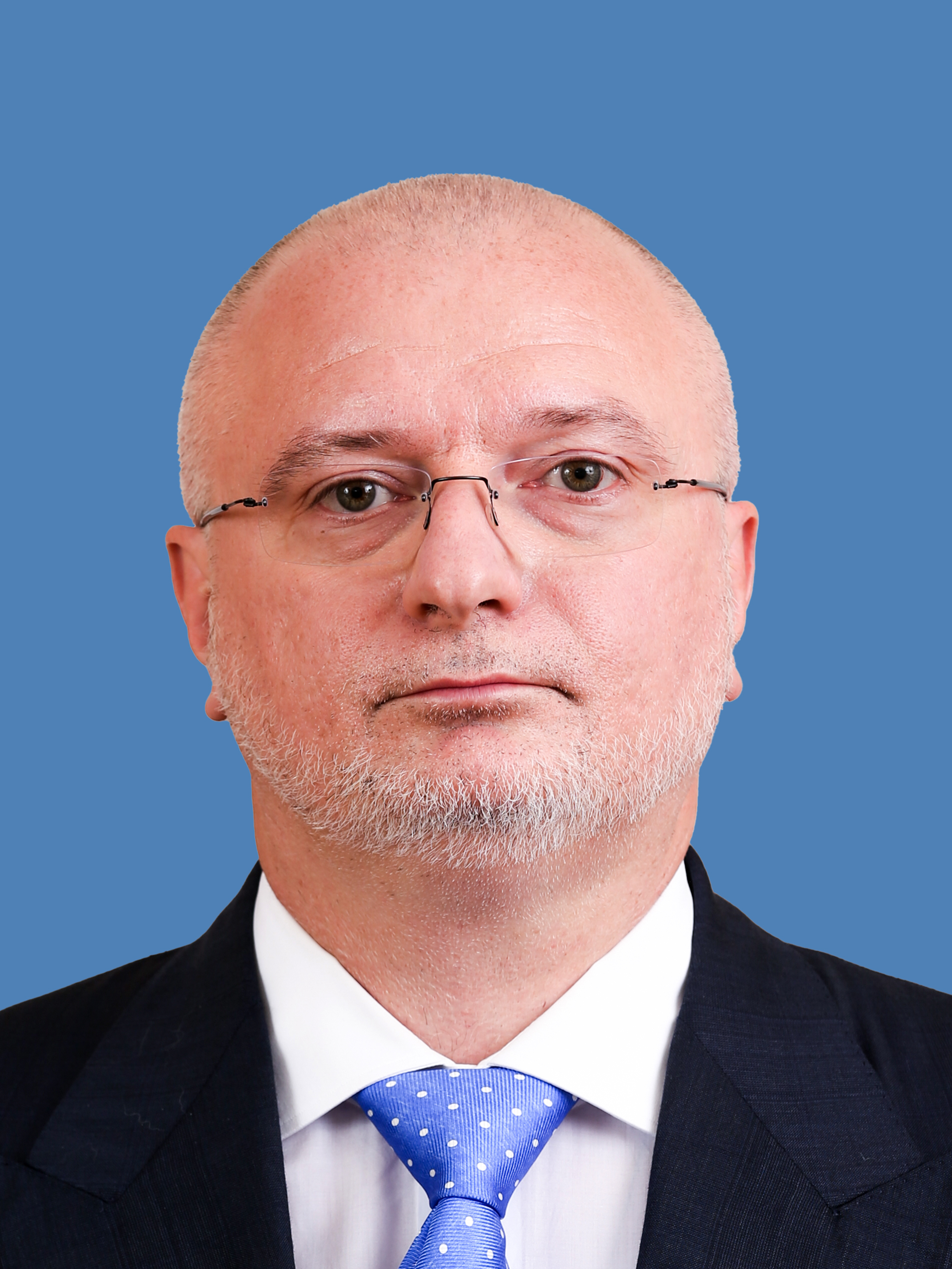

Russian Federation Senator from Krasnoyarsk Krai
- Incumbent
- Assumed office 19 March 2012 Serving with Valery Semenov
- Preceded by: Vera Oskina

Chair of the Federation Council Committee on constitutional legislation and state construction
- Incumbent
- Assumed office 30 May 2012
- Preceded by: Nikolay Fyodorov

Personal details
- Born: Andrey Alexandrovich Klishas; 9 November 1972 (age 53) Sverdlovsk, Sverdlovsk Oblast, Russian SFSR, USSR
- Party: United Russia
- Education: Ural State University; People's Friendship University of Russia, (JD)

Andrey Alexandrovich Klishas (Russian: Андре́й Алекса́ндрович Кли́шас; born 9 November 1972) is a Russian politician, lawyer and scholar of constitutional law serving as the Senator from Krasnoyarsk Krai since 2012. He is a member of the United Russia political party.

Andrey Klishas is the plenipotentiary of the Federation Council in the Constitutional Court of Russia and the General Prosecutor's office, judge of the World Canine Organization, and head of the department of theory of state and law of the Law Institute of People's Friendship University of Russia.

== Biography ==
Andrey Klishas born on 9 November 1972 in Sverdlovsk to father - Alexander Gennadyevich Klishas, military, retired colonel and mother - Vera Vasilievna, who worked as a chemical engineer.

Since 1990, he studied at the Ural State University (specializing in “History of Philosophy”), but did not graduate from it. He moved to Moscow, where he entered the Faculty of Economics and Law of the Peoples' Friendship University of Russia (RUDN University). In 1998, he received a bachelor's degree in law from the RUDN University, and in 2000 graduated from the university magistracy with a master's degree in law. In 2002 he graduated from the graduate school of the department of constitutional, administrative and financial law of the RUDN University.

In 1998, he joined the Board of Directors of Norilsk Nickel. From 2001 to 2008, he was chairman of the Board of Directors of MMC Norilsk Nickel. Since October 2001, he has been General Director; since December 2001, he has been chairman of the management board of Interros. He held the post until 2008. From 2010 to 2012 he was the President of Norilsk Nickel.

In December 2011, he ran for the State Duma by United Russia party list, but he didn't win a seat.

In March 2012, Klishas was elected to the Norilsk City Council of Deputies from United Russia party. On 19 March 2012, he was appointed Senator from Krasnoyarsk Krai by Governor Lev Kuznetsov.

On 30 May 2012, he became the Chairman of the Federation Council Committee on constitutional law, legal and judicial issues and the development of civil society (in 2014 renamed the committee on constitutional legislation and state construction).

In 2016, he became Head of the Department of Theory of State and Law of the Law Institute of RUDN University.

In February 2022, around the start of the Russian invasion of Ukraine, he said that "Now time has come to put a padlock on the embassies, and continue contact through binoculars and gunsights".

Klishas became the victim of a hoax when he added the fictional pro-Kremlin poet Gennady Rakitin as a "friend" on VKontakte. Russian anti-war activists created the fictional character of the poet Rakitin, who published real German Nazi poetry from the 1930s and 1940s glorifying Adolf Hitler, militarism, and the Nazi regime in Germany, pretending it was Russian patriotic poetry glorifying Vladimir Putin and his regime.

== Sanctions ==
He was sanctioned by the UK government in 2014 in relation to the Russo-Ukrainian War.

== Allegations of corruption ==
In September 2014, Alexei Navalny’s Anti-Corruption Foundation (FBK) accused Klishas of concealing a 400 m² dacha plot. In 2018, the foundation further accused him of owning an offshore company, failing to declare a vehicle, and engaging in manipulations during the privatization process of the 1990s. In addition to real estate, Klishas reportedly owns a collection of wristwatches valued at over 163 million rubles.
