= Utkino =

Utkino Уткино
- Village
- Location within Vologda Oblast Location within Russia
- Coordinates: 60°38′N 46°37′E
- Country: Russia
- Region: Vologda Oblast
- District: Velikoustyugsky District
- Time zone: UTC+3:00

Utkino (Russian: Уткино) is a rural locality (a village) in Pokrovskoye Rural Settlement, Velikoustyugsky District, Vologda Oblast, Russia. The population was 7 as of 2002.

== Geography ==
Utkino is located 25 km southeast of Veliky Ustyug (the district's administrative centre) by road. Chuchery is the nearest rural locality.
