= Inter-Services Public Relations media productions =

Military-backed Pakistani media content

Inter-Services Public Relations (ISPR), the media wing of the Pakistan military, has produced many media productions. Since the 1990s, the ISPR has been producing dramas, songs, films on military fiction, games and military reality shows. The drama Alpha Bravo Charlie was a hit ISPR production during the late 1990s. Following is a list of songs, shows, games, films and dramas produced by the ISPR. The productions are aimed at highlighting the sacrifices made by the Pakistan military.

== Documentary films ==
Year	Film	Notes
2011	The Glorious Resolve	Written by Irfan Aziz.
2016	Azeem Maa	
2016	This is our Home, This is Pakistan	A documentary showing strength of Pakistan.
2016	Hum Kon Hain	Defence and Martyrs Day documentary 2017.
2016	Road To Future (CPEC)	Defence Day documentary.
2017	Martyrs of Pakistan	Defence and Martyrs day documentary.
2017	Journey to Peace	
2017	Pakistan Army Team Spirit	
2017	Manzil Se Aage	For the remembrance and prayers for the soldiers and civilian combatants.
2018	Armed Forces Institute of Cardiology	The Armed Forces Institute of Cardiology(AFIC) is a documentary on the services of AFIC which is a government and military cardiac hospital located in Rawalpindi Cantonment, Punjab, Pakistan. This 800-bed cardiac health care institute is a major institute and hospital in Pakistan. The documentary details how hospital delivers heart disease and health care services to people of Pakistan Armed Forces and fellow citizens of Pakistan.
2018	Making of Pakistan	A documentary showing why and how Pakistan was created.
2018	Amazing Pakistan	A documentary showing diverse topography of Pakistan.
2018	Wishful Hopeless	A documentary achievement of Pakistani players who won the world title in different sports fields.
2018	The Other Side of Waziristan	A documentary showing role of Pakistan Army in the promotion of normalcy and development in Waziristan after Operation Zarb-e-Azb.
2018	Pakistan Counter Terrorism Force-Brother in Arms	A documentary showing role of Pakistan Army as the counter-terrorism force.
2018	Fangs of Terror	Fangs of Terror is a documentary by ISPR which highlights the sacrifices by armed forces against terrorism. The documentary focuses on saving lives by jointly defeating IEDs.
2018	Sisters in Arms	Documentary to honor women serving in the armed forces.
2018	CPEC First Convoy	
2018	A Legacy of Peacekeeping	
2018	Wahga Border	Documentary on Indo-Pakistani Wagah Border.
2018	Army Medical Corp	A documentary showing role of Pakistan Army Medical Corps in the service of the nation.
2018	UN Peacekeepers	Documentary on Pakistan Army role in UN. Pakistani army peacekeepers have participated in 43 UN peacekeeping missions including some of the most challenging ones.
2018	100 Miles 10 Division	A documentary showing role of 10th infantry division of Pakistan Army since the time of World War-II to the present day Pakistan.
2019	3 Days Standoff	Documentary about Abhinandan Varthaman and the 2019 Balakot airstrike on 26 Feb 2020 by India during the 2019 India–Pakistan border skirmishes. Events that occurred amid the plane shootdown and capturing of the Indian pilot are narrated in the documentary.
5 Aug 2020	365 of 370 – The Echoes of Freedom	A two episode documentary released on the occasion of first anniversary of India's abrogation of Article 370. The documentary highlights the legal, diplomatic and human rights violations during of the subsequent lockdown. Opinions of experts shed light on the reality of the abrogation of article 370 by the Modi government, arguing it to actually be a continuation of extremist and racist Hindutva ideology.
August 2020	Story of Pakistan	A multi-episode documentary series (7 episodes) based on the book.Struggle & Creation of Pakistan, by Dr. Riaz Ahmed. Each episode encompasses a crisp and authentic narration of the Pakistan Movement to create awareness among the youth about the history of Pakistan.
2020	Sarfarosh	A short video package that pays tribute to our doctors, healthcare workers, LEAs and civil administration on Defence and Martyrs’ Day 2020. It is a tribute from the nation to the front-line warriors in their fight against COVID-19. The video package highlights the contributions and selfless sacrifices of lab technicians, sanitary workers and ambulance crews etc.
2021	Azam-e-Alishan	A documentary showing efforts Pakistan Army under the command of National Command and Operation Center (NCOC) Pakistan that was organized and managed to combat COVID-19.
2021	Chiragh-e-Rah	A documentary in Urdu and English that highlights the role and contributions made by Pakistan Armed Forces in socio-economic development of remote areas along its western borders.
2022	KKH Documentary	A documentary released on new year of 1 January 2022 detailing role of FWO and Army Engineer Corps in the construction of Karakoram Highway (KKH).
2022	Jurrat Ke Nishaan	A reality-inspired Documentary consisted of several episodes depicting sacrifice of officers and soldiers who have been accoladed with the Sitara-e-Jurat and the Tamgah-e-Basalat.
2022	Azm e Falah	A documentary showing different welfare programs being run by the Pakistan Army. In episode 1 it shows cochlear implant surgery program of Combined Military Hospital Rawalpindi which is being conducted as a public welfare program for the hearing impaired children. Episode 2: A documentary on Army Special Education schools that are providing qualify education to the disabled children
2023	Aim Precise, Hit Precise	A documentary detailing how Pakistan Army Sniper School (PASS) trains Snipers of Pakistan Army.
2023	Shabash Naujawan	A documentary presenting youthful energy of Pakistani youth
2023	Sabz Lahu: Sacrifices for Freedom	A documentary presenting sacrifices soldiers and their families.
2024	ISSB - Inter Services Selection Board	A documentary showcasing the recruitment process of Inter Services Selection Board.

== Television dramas ==
Year	Drama	Director	Network(s)	Notes
1991	Sunehray Din	Shoaib Mansoor	PTV Home	
1992	Khajoor Main Atka	Lt. Col. Mansoor Rasheed	PTV Home	
1994	Mujahid		PTV Home	
1996	Ujalay Se Pehlay	Shehzad Rind	PTV Home	
1998	Alpha Bravo Charlie	Shoaib Mansoor	PTV Home	
2007	Wilco	Aehsun Talish	PTV Home	
2008	Sipahi Maqbool Hussain	Haider Imam Rizvi	PTV, TV One	
2009	Khuda Zameen Se Gaya Nahin	Kashif Nisar	PTV Home, Hum TV	
2012	Jaan Hatheli Par	Syed Hussnain Abbas	Urdu 1, PTV Home	
2014	Faseel-e-Jaan Se Aagay	Kashif Nisar	PTV Home	
2019-2020	Ehd-e-Wafa	Saife Hassan	PTV Home, Hum TV	
2021-2022	Sinf-e-Aahan	Nadeem Baig	ARY Digital	
2022	Team Muhafiz	Abid Hassan Abbasi	Geo News	Animated series

== Games ==
Year	Game	Note(s)
2018	The Glorious Resolve – Journey to Peace	

== Reality shows ==
Year	Show	Host	Notes
2021	60 Hours to Glory	Fakhar Alam	Based on the Pakistan Army Team Spirit (PATS) competition.

== Songs ==
This is a list of ISPR songs with their release year and singer.

Year	Song	Singer(s)	Notes
2009	"Rang Laega Shaheedon Ka Lahu"	Noor Jehan	Lyrics by Tanveer Naqi.
2009	"Hum Pakistan"	Rahat Fateh Ali Khan	
2012	"Quaid e Zi Waqar"	Rahat Fateh Ali Khan	Tribute To Muhammad Ali Jinnah.
2013	"Zameen Jaagti Hai"	Atif Aslam	Defence Day
2014	"Bara Dusman Bana Phirta Hai"	Azaan Ali	Tribute to martyrs of the 2014 Peshawar school massacre.
2014	"Sun Sakhiye"	Rahat Fateh Ali Khan	Tribute to martyrs of the Pakistan Army.
2015	"Sher Dil Shaheen"	Rahat Fateh Ali Khan	Tribute to Pakistan Air Force.
2015	"Kashmir – Ab Tou Hai Azad Yeh"	Azaan Ali	Tribute to Kashmiris.
2015	"Yeh Ghazi Yeh Tere Purisrar Banday"	Junaid Jamshed	Poem by Muhammad Iqbal.
2015	"Urain Ge"	Ali Zafar	Tribute to martys of the 2014 Peshawar school massacre.
2015	"Hanstay Hanstay"	Ali Zafar	2015 Defence and Martyrs Day.
2015	"Pakistan Say Rishta"	Rahat Fateh Ali Khan	
2016	"Tum Zinda Ho"	Rahat Fateh Ali Khan and Hina Nasrullah	Tribute to martyrs of the 2014 Peshawar school massacre.
2016	"Yaariyaan"	Atif Aslam and Ali Zafar	Defence Day
2016	"Mujhe Dushman Ke Bachon Ko"	Azaan Ali	Tribute to martyrs of the 2014 Peshawar school massacre.
2016	"Yeh Banday Mitti Kay Banday"	Mustafa Zahid	Tribute to Pakistan Army.
2016	"Pakistan Jiya Hai"	Rahat Fateh Ali Khan and Sahir Ali Bagga	2017 Defence Day
2016	"Shukriya Pakistan"	Rahat Fateh Ali Khan	2016 Independence Day
2016	"Paniyon Pe Chalen"	Rahat Fateh Ali Khan	Tribute To Pakistan Navy
2016	"Khak Jo Khoon Mein"	Rahat Fateh Ali Khan	2016 Defence Day
2016	"Pakistan Zindaabad"	Rahat Fateh Ali Khan	
2016	"Maa Kay Qadmon Say"	Rahat Fateh Ali Khan	
2017	"Allah Shukar Hai"	Rahat Fateh Ali Khan	
2017	"Hum Sab Ka Pakistan"	Rahat Fateh Ali Khan	Pakistan Day
2017	"Mera Ghar Yaad Rakho"	Rahat Fateh Ali Khan	
2017	"Watan Ki Jeet"	Ali Zafar	
2017	"Kabhi Percham Mein"	Atif Aslam	Defence Day
2017	"Tu Salaamat Watan"	Shafqat Amanat Ali	
2018	"Hamara Pakistan"	Shafqat Amanat Ali	Pakistan Day
2018	"Kashmir Ko Haqq Do Bharat"	Shehzad Roy	Kashmir Day
2018	"Mera Ghar"	Rahat Fateh Ali Khan	
2018	"Humain Pyaar Hai Pakistan Se"	Atif Aslam	Defence Day
2019	"Shaheen e Pakistan"	Atif Aslam	Pakistan Day special
2019	"Jaan De Deinge"	Ali Zafar	Pakistan Day special
2019	"Pakistan Zindabad"	Sahir Ali Bagga	
2019	"Vichora Tera"	Rahat Fateh Ali Khan	
2019	"Aye Watan"	Rahat Fateh Ali Khan	
2020	"Charhta Suraj Hai Apna Pakistan"	Rahat Fateh Ali Khan	
2020	"Kashmir Hun Main"	Sahir Ali Bagga	Kashmir Solidarity Day
2020	"Ja Chod De Meri Wadi"	Shafqat Amanat Ali	Youm-e-Istehsal
2020	"Yun Pakistan Bana Tha"	Sahir Ali Bagga	Independence Day
2020	"Har Ghari Tayyar Kamran"		Defense and Martyr's day
2021	"Aik Qaum, Aik Manzil"	Ali Zafar and Aima Baig	Pakistan Day
2021	"Jaag Raha Hai Pakistan"	Many artists	Pakistan Day
2022	"Shaad Rahe Pakistan"	Yashal Shahid and Shuja Haider	Pakistan day

- Compilation album: Dhanak Kay Rang (2020)

== Telefilms ==
Year	Telefilm	Director	Network(s)	Refs
1998	Ghazi Shaheed	Kazim Pasha	PTV	
2016	Ek Thi Marium	Sarmad Sultan Khoosat	Urdu 1	
2021	Aik Hai Nigar	Adnan Sarwar	ARY Digital, PTV Home	
2021	Hangor S-131	Saqib Khan	ARY Digital	

== See also ==
- List of television programmes broadcast by PTV
- List of Pakistani television series
