= United States Tent Pegging Federation =

United States Tent Pegging Federation, Inc. (USTPF)
- Sport: National governing body for tent pegging sports
- Category: Ancient equestrian sports
- Jurisdiction: National
- Abbreviation: USTPF
- Founded: December 30, 2013
- Headquarters: Tulsa, Oklahoma, United States
- President: Dr. Asim Shahzad Malik D.B.A.

Official website
- www.ustpf.org

The United States Tent Pegging Federation (USTPF), is a national governing body for the equestrian sport of tent pegging in the United States. The USTPF was established on December 30, 2013, and registered with the Oklahoma Secretary of State. Its headquarters is in Tulsa, Oklahoma. The group is a member of the ITPF and Alliance Partner of the US Equestrian. Its president is Dr. Asim Shahzad Malik D.B.A., and its secretary/treasurer is Mrs. Shazia B. Malik.

== History ==
The USTPF was founded with the intentions to promote this equestrian sport in the continental US on December 30, 2013, by engaging youth, junior, senior and masters age groups in Tent Pegging. In the following year the USTPF was accepted and recognized by the International Tent Pegging Federation. The USTPF has organized training clinics in 2014, 2015, and 2017. Riders from the U.S. states of Maryland, Texas, and New York attended these trainings.

The USTPF was initially accepted and recognized as a member by the ITPF in April 2014, when the president of the USTPF met the president of the ITPF during the World Cup Tournament 2014 in Muscat, Oman. The USTPF obtained ITPF membership on April 30, 2014.

The USTPF was accepted and recognized for Alliance Partner Member by the United States Equestrian Federation (USEF) in February 2015. The USTPF has remained a member since February 2015.

== International representation ==
The USTPF trained Team USA represented the nation abroad as follow:

- World Cup Qualifying Tournament (WCQT) in Khartoum, Sudan in January 2016. The WCQT event was organized by the Equestrian Federation of Sudan (EFS). Team USA reached fifth position in the event.
- Participated in a training event in Muscat, Oman in March 2016. This Training was Offered, Sponsored and Organized by the ITPF. At the end of training in a friendly competition Team USA came home with fourth position.
- Friendly tournament in Bergen, Norway in August 2016. The friendly event was organized by the Norway Tent Pegging Federation (NTPF). The Team USA came home with silver cup and silver medal in the Indian File Event.
- Friendly tournament in Berlin, Germany, in April–May 2017. The friendly event was organized by the German Tent Pegging Federation (GTPF). The Team USA earned first place with gold cup and gold medal in the Indian File Event.
- World Cup Qualifying Tournament in Dammam, Kingdom of Saudi Arabia in January 2018. The WCQT event was organized by the Equestrian Federation of Kingdom of Saudi Arabia (EFKSA). The Team USA won a bronze medal.

== Photo gallery ==
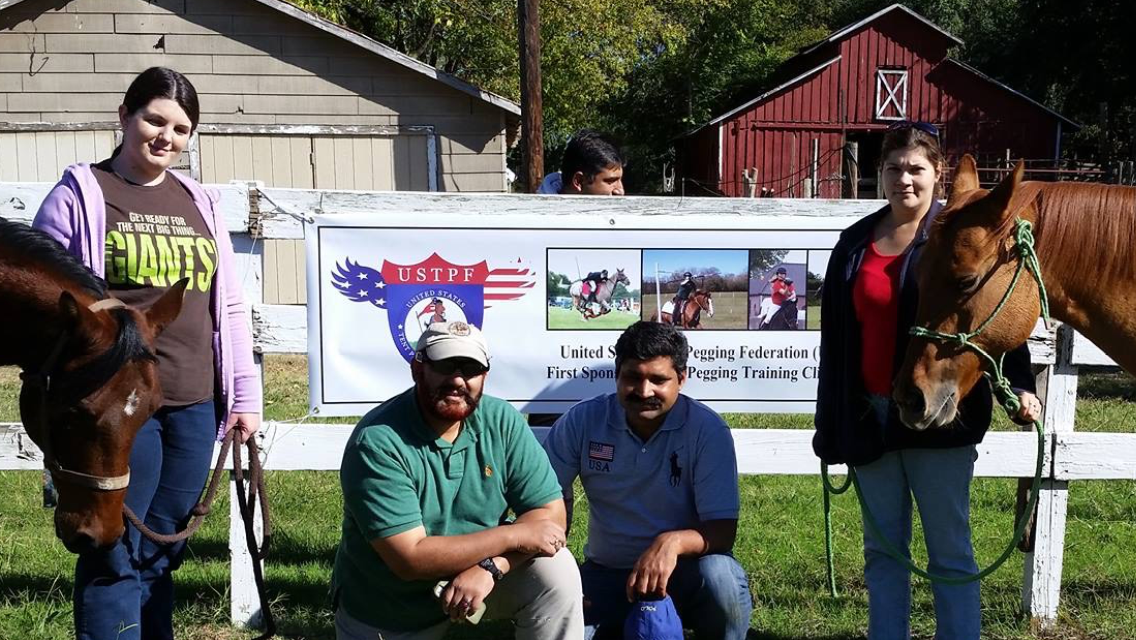
First Training Clinic Tulsa, OK October 2014

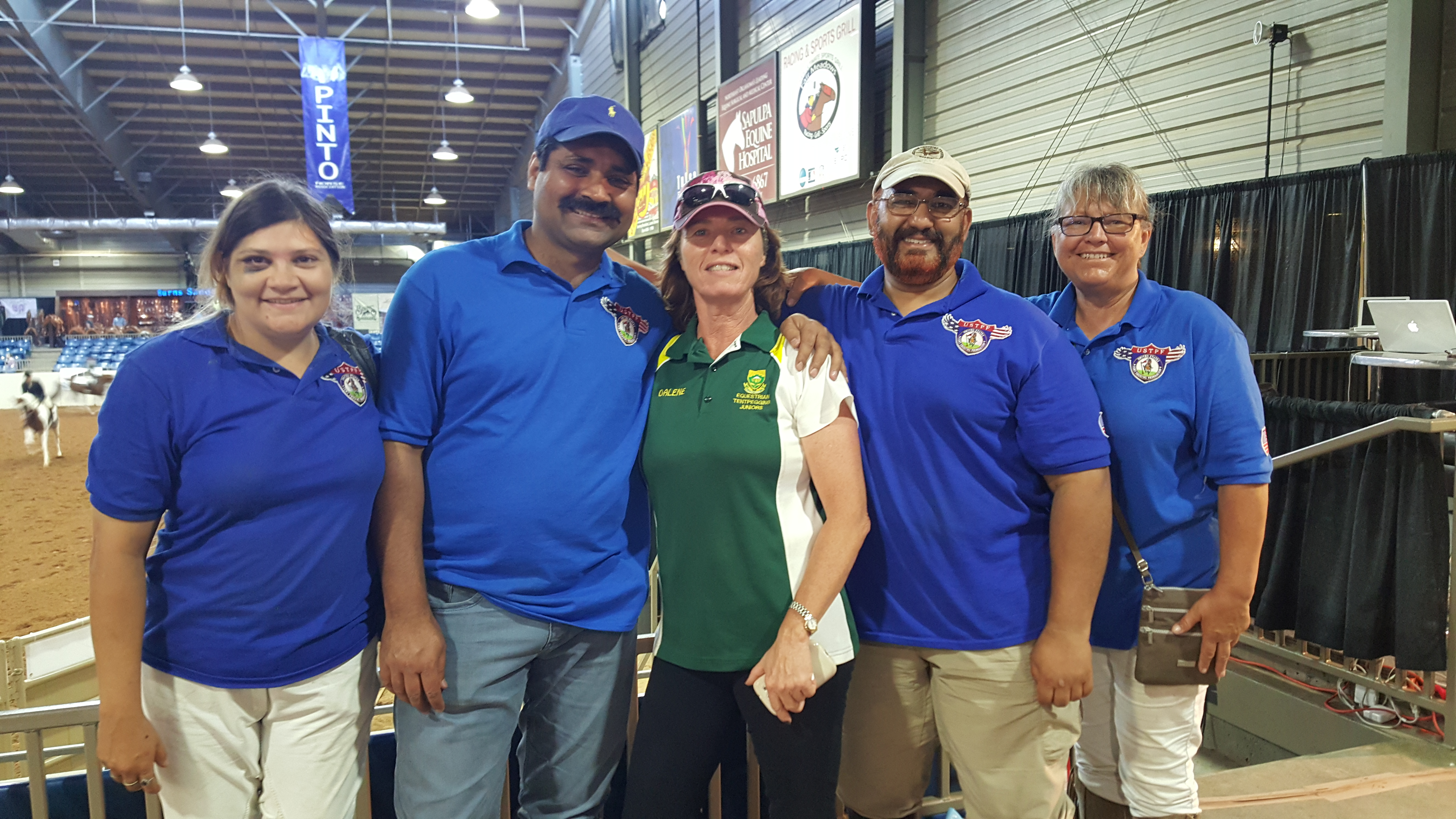
Second Training Clinic Tulsa, OK June 2015

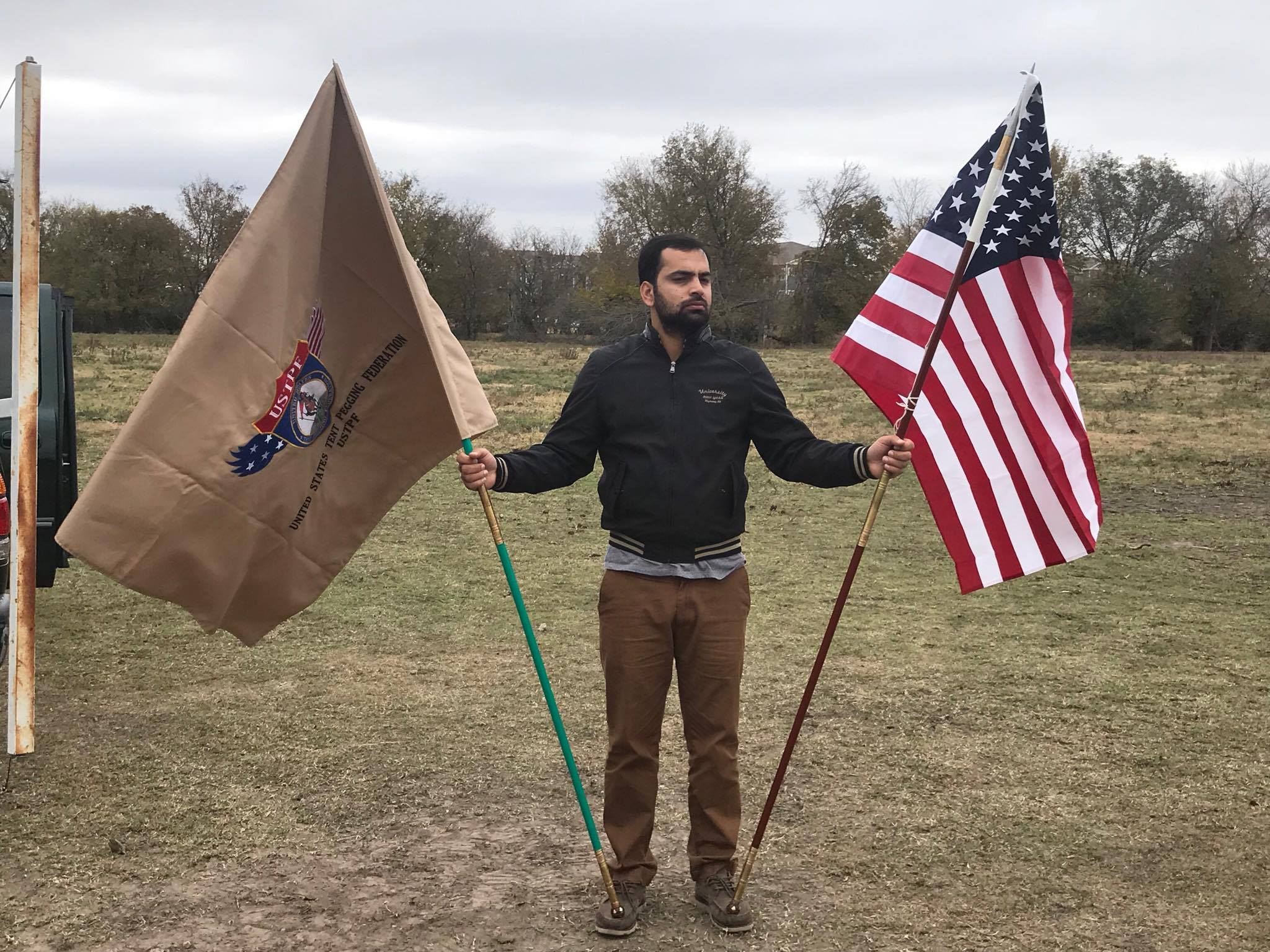
Third Training Clinic Tulsa, OK November 2017
