= 60 Hours to Glory =

Pakistani military reality show

- Genre: Reality show
- Based on: Pakistan Army Teams Spirit, PATS
- Presented by: Pakistan Army; ISPR
- Starring: Pakistan Army Personals
- Voices of: Fakhar-e-Alam
- Country of origin: Pakistan
- Original language: Urdu
- No. of seasons: 1
- No. of episodes: 24

Production
- Editors: Pakistan Army Media Wing; ISPR
- Camera setup: Multi-camera
- Running time: 30-35 minutes

Original release
- Network: HUM TV; Hum News; PTV Home; ISPR
- Release: 12 June – 6 September 2021

Related
- Alpha Bravo Charlie; More related Shows

60 Hours to Glory was Pakistan's first ever military reality show which featured 12 teams including 4 teams from Turkey, Sri Lanka, Uzbekistan and Jordon respectively participating in 60-hour long 4th International Pakistan Army Team Spirit Competition. The show was produced by ISPR and telecasted by PTV Home, Hum News, Hum TV and ISPR YouTube channel.

== Participants ==
12 teams participated in 4th International Pakistan Army Team Spirit Competition, with each team having eight members.

=== Local teams ===
- Rawalpindi Pasbans
- Lahore Taiz-o-tund
- Gujranwala Sarfarosh
- Quetta Hingorians
- Bahawalpur Thunders
- Mangla Zilzaal
- Karachi Zinda Dil
- Multan Charging Bulls

=== Foreign teams ===
- Team Turkey
- Team Uzbekistan
- Team Sri Lanka
- Team Jordan

== See also ==
- Inter-Services Public Relations media productions
