= Riaz Ahmed (academic) =

Pakistani academic

- Occupations: Associate Professor of Applied Chemistry, human rights advocate
- Employer: University of Karachi
- Known for: Syndicate activism, human rights advocacy

Riaz Ahmed is a Pakistani academic, human rights advocate, and Associate Professor of Applied Chemistry at the University of Karachi (KU). Known for his stance on academic freedom and transparency in university governance, Ahmed has faced enforced disappearances and detentions due to his activism.

== Academic career ==
Ahmed is an Associate Professor and Chair at KU’s Department of Applied Chemistry. He has been vocal in KU's syndicate over administrative irregularities, including concerns over improper degree conferrals.

== Human rights activism ==
His activism includes organizing seminars on enforced disappearances following the killing of activist Sabeen Mahmud.

== Arrests and detentions ==
In April 2017, Ahmed was arrested by the Pakistan Rangers ahead of a press conference supporting detained professor Hasan Zafar Arif. He was charged with possessing an unlicensed pistol, which human rights groups described as a fabricated charge.

In May 2018, he went missing near the KU campus. His disappearance was linked to his support for the Pashtun Tahaffuz Movement (PTM). After public pressure, he returned safely.

In September 2024, Ahmed was detained by Karachi police for eight hours while en route to a syndicate meeting, sparking protests by civil society and faculty. He was later released without charges.

== See also ==
- University of Karachi
- Pashtun Tahaffuz Movement
- Human rights in Pakistan
- Enforced disappearances in Pakistan
