= Agha Muhammad Ali =

Pakistani police officer (1910–1992)

Agha Muhammad Ali Khan

Deputy Director of the Intelligence Bureau
- In office c. 1969–1971

Personal details
- Born: 17 September 1910 Campbellpur, Punjab, British India
- Relatives: Yahya Khan (brother)
- Education: Forman Christian College; Aligarh Muslim University
- Police career
- Allegiance: British India; Pakistan
- Branch: Indian Imperial Police (1935–1947); West Pakistan Police (1947–1969)
- Rank: Inspector-General

Agha Muhammad Ali Khan (born 17 November 1910) was a Pakistani police officer and Inspector general. He was the elder brother of General Yahya Khan, who was the President of Pakistan under martial law from 1969 to 1971. He also served as a director of the Intelligence Bureau.

== Early life and education ==
Agha Muhammad Ali Khan was born on 17 September 1910, in Campbellpur, British India, into a well-known Qizilbash family. His father, Saadat Ali Khan (b. 28 Nov 1883), was an officer of the Indian Imperial Police and retired in 1938 as Deputy Superintendent of Police in the Punjab Province.

The British colonial administration granted Saadat Ali Khan the title Khan Sahib in recognition of his service in the secret disposal of the bodies of executed freedom fighters, including revolutionary Bhagat Singh. The authorities sought to prevent public reaction, and Khan was praised for performing the operation efficiently and faithfully.

Ali's family home, which was built in 1890, still stands in the walled city of Peshawar.

Ali matriculated from Government High School, Peshawar, in 1928, and graduated from Forman Christian College in Lahore in 1932. He later attended Aligarh Muslim University for a Master of Science (M.Sc.) degree, although he did not complete his studies there.

== Police career ==
=== British India ===
Ali Khan joined the Indian Imperial Police in 1935 as an Inspector of Police, following in the footsteps of his father. In 1942, he was promoted to the rank of Deputy Superintendent of Police (DSP) and later became Superintendent of Police in 1947.

=== Pakistan ===
Following the Partition of India in 1947, Khan chose to serve in the newly established Dominion of Pakistan.

From 1948 to 1951, he served as the Senior Superintendent of Police (SSP) in Lahore. In September 1952, he was promoted to the position of Assistant Inspector General of Police. He was also the Deputy inspector general of police of the Peshawar branch for some time.

After the Indo-Pakistani air war of 1965, Ali was overseeing covert operations within the Special Branch. He reportedly actively fanned anti-government agitations. He allegedly utilized his established channels with various political parties to covertly coordinate and sustain the protests that eventually led to Ayub Khan's resignation in 1969 and the transfer of power to Ali's brother, General Yahya Khan.

Agha Mohammad Ali retired from active police service after reaching the final rank of Inspector general of police.

=== Yahya era (1969-1971) ===
When his brother Yahya came to power in 1969, Agha Muhammad Ali was appointed Deputy Director of the Intelligence Bureau. Ali is credited with the abolishment of the One Unit Scheme in 1970. Prior to the 1970 Pakistani general election, Ali was chief of the Intelligence Bureau. He is said to have persuaded the Khan of Kalat to join Abdul Qayyum Khan's Muslim League.

Some sources also state he was made head of the National security council in 1970. Ali would visit the former President Ayub Khan many times during 1971, to ask for his views and advice on the situation in East Pakistan.

== Personal life ==
=== Sports and hobbies ===
Ali Khan was an accomplished sportsman. He was a member of his college's hockey eleven and participated in police tournaments. His love for physical activity extended to horse riding and shooting.

=== Relationship with Yahya Khan ===
Ali Khan shared a close relationship with his younger brother, General Agha Muhammad Yahya Khan, who rose through the ranks of the military to become the army chief and, under martial law, the President of Pakistan. During his brother's presidency, Ali could not easily meet with him.

Ali had very little influence over Yahya and his personal life. As of 1979, Ali Khan lived in Lahore.
