= Fakhar-e-Alam =

Pakistani celebrity/pop music artist

Fakhar-e-Alam فخر عالم
- Genres: Pakistani hip hop; pop; bhangra
- Occupations: Actor; singer; songwriter; video jockey; host; rapper; producer
- Years active: 1993 – Present
- Label: Sound Master
- Website: missionparwaaz.com

Fakhar-e-Alam
- Awards: Sitara-e-Imtiaz (Star of Excellence) Award by the President of Pakistan in 2023

Fakhar-e-Alam (Punjabi, Urdu: فخر عالم) (born 19 January 1976) is a Pakistani actor, singer, songwriter, TV host, video jockey, rapper and producer famous for introducing the bhangra-rap fusion genre of music in Pakistan. He is considered a pioneer of bhangra-rap music of Lahore in the 1990s. He currently hosts TV shows, sports broadcasts, and high-profile national and international productions.

He also served as the chairman of the Sindh Board of Film Censors from 2013 to 2016.

In 2018, he became the first and, to date, the only Pakistani in world history to circumnavigate the globe in a solo flight, in what he called Mission Parwaaz. He was aiming for a 28-day schedule and was planning on flying to 30 airports around the world.

== Personal life ==
=== Family background ===
Fakhar-e-Alam was born on 19 January 1976 in Lahore, Pakistan. His maternal grandmother Akleem Akhtar, also known as General Rani, was a socialite close to dictator General Yahya Khan, who ruled Pakistan from 1969 to 1971, while his mother Aroosa Alam is a journalist. Akleem Akhtar ('The Rani General') garnered the reputation of being the "most powerful woman in Pakistan" due to her role as the "muse and mistress" of General Yahya Khan.

In 2017, Sukhpal Singh Khaira, Leader of the Opposition in India's Punjab Legislative Assembly, alleged that Fakhar-e-Alam's mother Aroosa had affiliations with the ISI and served as a Pakistani spy. It was claimed that she resided at the official residence of India's Punjab Chief Minister Amarinder Singh. Additionally, she was colloquially referred to as the 'First Lady of Punjab' due to her relationship with the Amarinder Singh and was reported to have close ties with the Pakistani military establishment.

=== Education ===
In 2022, after doing an online course from the Harvard Business School, he earned an Alternative Investments certificate at the age of 46.

== Career ==
=== Music ===
Fakhar-e-Alam started his career as Pakistan's first rap artist with the music album "RAP UP" in 1993. The same year, he debuted as a presenter in Pakistan's first pop chart television show, "Music Channel Charts". After the success of "Music Channel Charts", he was offered the position of a presenter for "Pepsi Top of the Pops".

He met great success with his single "Bhangra Pao", a fusion of bhangra and rap music, in 1993. He received a gold disc for his debut album and is considered one of EMI Records' most successful artists. The single was also broadcast on MTV.

=== Acting ===
He has acted in movies such as Very Good Dunya Very Bad Log (1998) and in television serials such as Do Biwiyan Ek Bechara (2018).

=== Production ===
When he arrived in Karachi in 2004, Fakhar-e-Alam was offered a CEO position in an electronic media marketing company. He accepted the offer and stayed with the company for three months. He then launched his own production house called Industree Productions.

=== Philanthropy ===
Fakhar-e-Alam was actively involved in humanitarian activities and relief work after the 2005 Kashmir earthquake.

=== Hosting ===
Fakhr-e-Alam's show Aaghaz-e-Safar, based on real-life stories of Pakistanis, aired on 18 April 2014. The show was produced and directed by Sharmeen Obaid-Chinoy, a two-time Pakistani Oscar winner. It was the first time Obaid-Chinoy produced for a Pakistani TV channel. The show aired on AAJ TV in Pakistan.

In 2016, after the murder of a popular qawwal, Amjad Sabri, in Karachi, Fakhr-e-Alam led a movement pressing for better government security for artists.

On 1 August 2017, he became the second Pakistani celebrity invited to speak at Googleplex.

In May 2021, he was announced as the host of 60 Hours to Glory, a military reality show featuring several international teams. It was broadcast on Hum TV, Hum News, and PTV Home. On 27 June 2021, he was bestowed with the UAE golden visa, making him the first Pakistani celebrity to receive it.

On 2 October 2021, Fakhr-e-Alam announced a partnership with Dubai-based esports organisation Galaxy Racer. As a result of the deal, the two parties will collaborate to create Galaxy Racer Pakistan. Later that month, he hosted the sports show The Pavilion on A Sports as part of its coverage of the 2021 ICC Men's T20 World Cup.

Alam hosted The Pavilion for the 2023 Cricket World Cup, which has become a global hit and recognized as the biggest cricket show in cricketing world. It has gained massive popularity especially within India.

== Awards ==
- National Film Award for Best Actor in Very Good Dunya Very Bad Loag (1998)
- Sitar-e-Eesaar (Presidential Medal of Sacrifice and Honour) in 2006
- Sitara-e-Imtiaz (Star of Excellence) Award by the President of Pakistan for TV show hosting and contributions to music, in 2023.

== Discography ==
=== Albums ===
- Bhangra Rap (1994)
- Laut Aao (1995)
- Munda Pakistani (1996)
- Malang (1997)
- Falam Connection (2001)
- Falam Ab Tak (2004)
- B3 (2012)

== Filmography ==
=== Films ===
| Year | Title | Country | Note |
|---|---|---|---|
| 1998 | Very Good Dunya Very Bad Log | Pakistan | Film debut |
| 2000 | No Paisa No Problem | Pakistan | |
| 2006 | Sarhad Paar | India | Hindi debut; special appearance |

=== Television ===
| Year | Title | Role | Channel | Note |
|---|---|---|---|---|
| 1999 | Gulls & Guys | Host | PTV | Documentary and travel guide reality show |
| 2005 | Dost | | ARY Digital | Drama serial which featured Indian artists |
| 2018 | Do Biwiyan Ek Bechara | Faisal | ARY Digital | Lead role in a comedy-drama serial |
| 2022 | Bolain Kya Baat Hai | Host | Geo News | Sports show |

== Books ==
- Mission Parwaaz: Fakhr Alam Making History, Markings Publishing, 2019, 219 p. Book detailing how he circumnavigated the globe in a solo flight.
