= Akleem Akhtar =

Mistress of Pakistani President of Gen. Yahya Khan

- اکلیم اختر
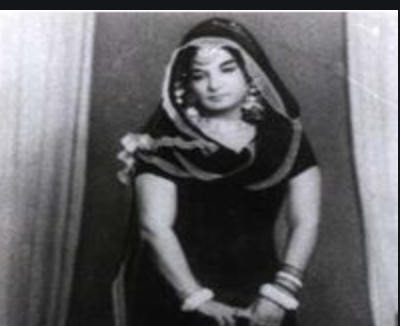
- Akleem Akhtar in 1960s
- Born: c. 1931/1932; Gujrat, Punjab, British Raj
- Died: 1 July 2002 (aged 70–71); Lahore, Punjab, Pakistan
- Spouse: Moiz Jee
- Partner: General Yahya Khan (Military dictator of Pakistan from 1969 to 1971)
- Children: 6
- Relatives: Fakhar-e-Alam (grandson)

Akleem Akhtar (Urdu: اکلیم اختر; 1931/1932 – 1 July 2002), also known as General Rani (the Queen General), was the mistress of Yahya Khan. Some considered her the most powerful woman in Pakistan during his regime.

== Early life ==
Akhtar was born in Gujrat city in Punjab, British India, in 1931 or 1932, to a conservative middle-class family. During her childhood, she was considered intelligent by many people and was reported to enjoy outdoor sports.

Her parents married her off to a police officer twice her age, 'Moiz Jee', an inhabitant of North Karachi. They had six children. In 1963, when on holiday in the cool hills of Murree, Akhtar suddenly snapped and rebelled against her husband by removing her niqab. The marriage ended in divorce, with Akhtar taking their six children with her. Without an income of her own, the family struggled, and When her parents refused to help her unless she returned to her husband, she started seeking out powerful, wealthy men to associate with.

Akhtar started visiting nightclubs and similar venues frequented by the business, political and military elite in Karachi, Lahore and Rawalpindi. She made contact with attractive young women who had run away from home for various reasons, having suffered poverty and harsh circumstances there.

Akhtar reportedly adopted the motto "Miyan ki juti miyan ke sar" ("Beat men at their own game"), and started a prostitution business, she insisted that she had only played a background role, acting as a 'mother figure' to the young women she trafficked to wealthy and influential men.

== Relationship with Yahya Khan ==
Akhtar had a close relationship with the Khan, reportedly calling him 'Agha Jani'. Although she held no official position in his circle, she was given special privileges due to their close association. She publicly denied being Yahya Khan's mistress, claiming that they were merely friends. In one interview, she said that she had exploited the Khan's weaknesses for alcohol and women.

Akhtar was also referred to as 'General Rani', which translates to 'the General's Queen'. Rani was Akhtar's alias, and she was referred to as 'General' by the general public and media due to her inclusion in the inner circle of Khan during his military rule in Pakistan between 1969 and 1971. In an effort to garner the attention of Khan, a number of bureaucrats and politicians approached Akhtar.

== Death and legacy ==
In May 2002, Pakistani media reported Akhtar had breast cancer that metastasized to her liver and kidney. She died at the age of 70 or 71, on 1 July 2002 at Shaikh Zayed Hospital in Lahore after fighting cancer for five years.

Akhtar is the maternal grandmother ('Naani') of a Pakistani pop star Fakhar-e-Alam.

She was portrayed by Aarya Sharma in the 2023 Hindi film Gadar 2.

== See also ==
- Joanne Herring
- Cynthia D. Ritchie
