= Tent pegging =

Equestrian sport

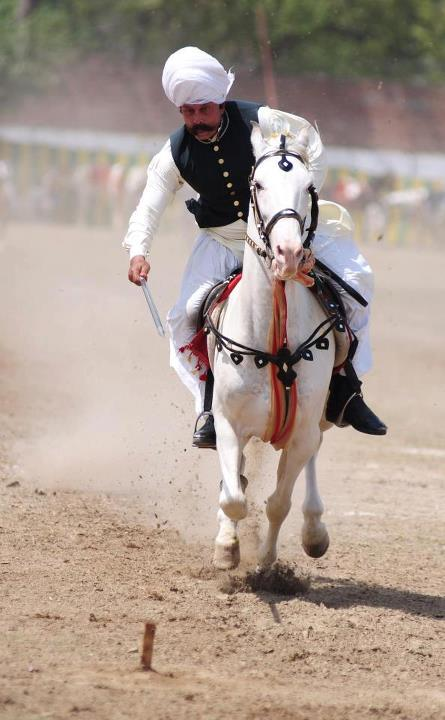
- One of the founders of the International Tent Pegging Federation, Malik Ata Muhammad Khan, with his Lance at the Ranger Ground Lahore, 2012
- Highest governing body: International Tent Pegging Federation
- Nicknames: Tent Pegging
- First played: 4th century BC

Characteristics
- Contact: Yes
- Team members: Single or Section
- Mixed-sex: Yes, separate competitions
- Type: Individual Lance or Sword/Team Lance or Sword/Lemons and Peg/ Rings and Peg/Team and Pairs/Lance, Sword, and Revolver/Indian File
- Equipment: Lance, Sword, and/or Revolver
- Venue: Tent Pegging Ground

Presence
- Country or region: Worldwide

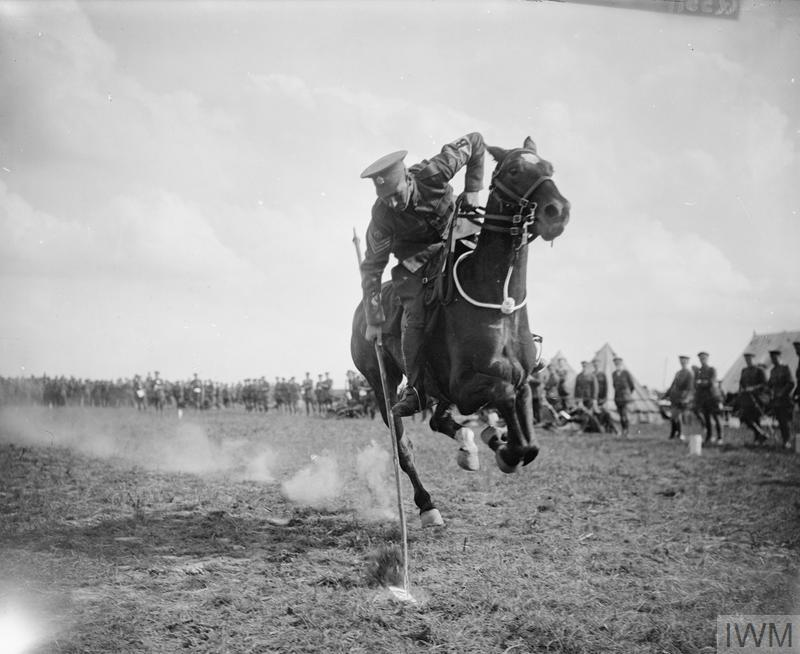
At Ecoivres, France, a cavalryman displays his tent-pegging skills at a Horse show organised by the XIII British Corps, 20 June 1917.

Tent pegging (sometimes spelled tent-pegging or tentpegging) is a cavalry sport of ancient origin, in which a mounted horseman attempts to strike or pick up a small item (such as a tent peg) with a weapon at high speed.

It is one of only ten equestrian disciplines officially recognised by the International Equestrian Federation. Used narrowly, the term refers to a specific mounted game with ground targets. More broadly, it refers to the entire class of mounted cavalry games involving pointed and edged weapons (lance and sword) on horseback, for which the term "equestrian skill-at-arms" is also used.

== Origin ==
Tent pegging has been practised by mounted riders since at least the 4th century BC. Eurasian empires spread the game around the world. As a result, the game's date and location of origin are unknown.

In all accounts, the competitive sport evolved out of cavalry training exercises designed to develop cavaliers' prowess with the sword and lance from horseback. However, whether tent pegging developed cavaliers' generic skills or prepared them for specific combat situations is unclear.

According to the International Equestrian Federation, "most equestrian authorities are of the opinion that tent-pegging originated in the Indian subcontinent during the middle ages in the battlefields as a tactic used by the horsed cavalry against elephant mounted troops" A cavalier able to precisely stab the highly sensitive flesh behind an elephant's toenail would cause the enemy elephant to rear, unseat his mahout, and possibly run amok, breaking ranks and trampling infantry.

The term "tent pegging" may be related to the idea that cavalry mounting a surprise pre-dawn raid on an enemy camp could use the tent-pegging skills to sever or uproot tent pegs, collapsing the tents on their sleeping occupants and sowing havoc and terror in the camp. However, there are few reliable accounts of a cavalry squadron ever employing such tactics.

Because the specific game of tent-pegging is the most popular equestrian skill-at-arms game, the entire class of sports became known as tent-pegging during the twilight of cavalry in the twentieth century.

== Essential rules ==
The specific game of tent pegging has a mounted horseman riding at a gallop and using a sword or a lance to pierce, pick up, and carry away a small ground target (a symbolic tent peg) or a series of small ground targets.

The broader class of tent pegging games also includes ring jousting (in which a galloping rider tries to pass the point of his weapon through a suspended ring); lemon sticking (in which the rider tries to stab or slice a lemon suspended from a cord or sitting on a platform); quintain tilting (in which the rider charges a mannequin mounted on a swivelling or rocking pedestal); and mounted archery.

A given tent pegging competition's rules specify the size and composition of the target; the number of consecutive targets placed on a course; the dimensions and weight of the sword and lance; the minimum time in which a course must be covered; and the extent to which a target must be struck, cut, or carried.

== Contemporary sport ==
Today, tent pegging is practised around the world but is especially popular in Australia, India, Oman, Pakistan, South Africa, and the United Kingdom. The Olympic Council of Asia included tent pegging as an official sport in 1982, and the International Federation for Equestrian Sports recognised it as an official equestrian discipline in 2004.

New and emerging national tent pegging associations have helped spread the sport's popularity. The Australian Royal Adelaide Show, the British Tent Pegging Association, and the United States Cavalry Association now hold annual national championships and demonstrations in their respective countries.

The United States Tent Pegging Association (USTPA) is a not-for-profit organization registered in the New York state and is the National Governing Body for the sport of tent pegging in the US. USTPA is the premier equestrian sports body dedicated solely to the promotion and development of the equestrian sport of tent pegging across the US In Pakistan tent pegging is also named neza bazi. It is played in Punjab, Khyber Pakhtunkhwa and some parts of Sindh and Balochistan, it is the unofficial provincial sport of Balochistan, Pakistan. There are many clubs who have owned different and unique style of Turban and Waistcoat to identify their clubs. People decorate their horses for the competition. Every club arranges a neza bazi competition. All clubs are invited to participate in the competition. There are some specific shows being arranged since many decades. National Horse and Cattle Show is one of them. It is held at the Fortress Stadium in Lahore every year usually in end of February or at first week of March. Tent pegging is a part of this event. Clubs from all the districts of Pakistan participates there. It is also popular with British Pakistanis.

The pre-eminent tent pegging games remain centred in Asia and the Middle East, with the International Tent Pegging Championships and the continental Asian Games traditionally enjoying the highest number of competitors and participating states.

== Governing bodies ==
The recognised international governing body of tent pegging is International Tent Pegging Federation. The ITPF headquarters are located in Muscat, Oman. It was founded as World Tent Pegging Federation in 2013 by representatives from England, Australia and South Africa, Pakistan, India and others renamed the World Tent Pegging Federation in 2014, and took up its current name in the same year. Essentially ITPF is very new and does and does not have full world recognition and not all countries which play tent pegging are its members. Also ITPF is the largest equestrian body in the world that recognizes and governs tent pegging competitions.

Tent pegging being primarily a foreign game from the Indian subcontinent, and was faded from the equestrian sports map of the US. However, tent pegging was well known prior to the World War II in the continental US. As a need of present times, with tent pegging being played in many countries around the world, USTPF came into existence as a national governing body for tent pegging and to promote tent pegging domestically and represent US internationally. USTPF was formed in 2013 in the US. USTPF participated in many international events the 2016 and the US secured the place in the international tent pegging arena.

The ITPF has 28 members: The ITPF is responsible for the organisation and governance of tent pegging's major international tournaments, notably the Tent Pegging World Cup. It also appoints the judges and referees that officiate at all matches and events. Each nation has a national federation which regulates Tent pegging events played in its country. The Tent pegging federation also selects the national squad and organizes home and away tours for the national team.

=== Members ===
The ITPF has 28 members countries in beginning. Following are the members of the federation, which include Oman, Pakistan, Yemen, India, Nepal, Tentpegging Germany, British Tent Pegging Association, Australian Tentpegging Federation, Afghanistan, South Africa, United Arab Emirates, Sri Lanka, Sweden, Norway, Sudan, Qatar, Netherlands Association for Mounted Skill-at-Arms 'Saint Georges' (NVBW), Namibia, Lebanon, Kazakhstan, Jordan, Iraq, Egypt, Iranian Tentpegging Association, Canada, Bahrain, and Denmark.

== International Competitions ==
Since its formation the ITPF has organised several international competitions.

=== First Tent Pegging World Cup 2014 ===
After the formation of the federation, the world body decided to launch their own World Cup competition. The first and the inaugural Tent Pegging World Cup was organised by the Oman Equestrian Federation (OEF) at Al Rahba Farm, Barka, Oman from 31 March to 4 April 2014. The participant countries were Pakistan, Oman, Qatar, Yemen, Iraq, Egypt, South Africa, Britain and Australia who qualified the Sudan and Pakistan qualifying events in January and February respectively.

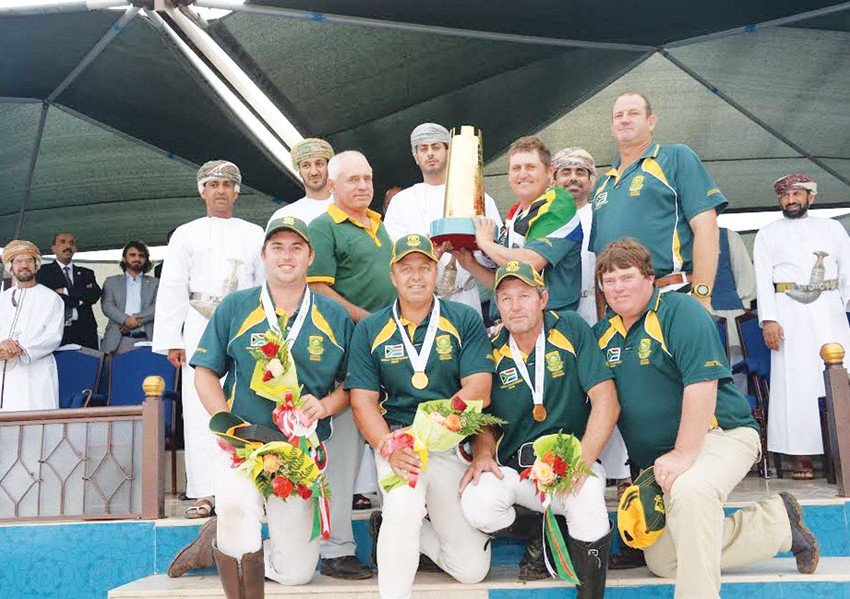
South African team with World cup trophy 2014

South Africa won the event by a total of 758.5 points and clinch the enviable honour of being the first world champions. Oman got second position with 693.5 points. Sudan, who finished with 654 points, took the third place.

== International championships and world cup history ==
Year	Host Nation(s)	Final Venue	Final		
Year	Host Nation(s)	Final Venue	Winner	Result	Runner-up
2014	Oman	Al Rahba Farm, Muscat, Oman	South Africa; 758.5 points	South Africa won by 65 runs	Oman; 693.5 points
2023	South Africa	George, Western Cape, South Africa	Saudi Arabia; 781.5 points	Saudi Arabia won by 11.5 runs	Pakistan; 770 points

== International and world championships ==
One of the first International tent Pegging Championships were held in the State of Hyderabad, India in 1985 with many International Teams participating under the aegis of Equestrian Federation of India (EFI).

International and world championships are held among countries consisted on different number of teams. Venues are selected through negotiations. There are major events in tent pegging. Oman, South Africa, Pakistan, India, Australia, and the United Kingdom hosts the international championships regularly. Other countries also organize the events at different times.

=== 2007 International Tent pegging Championship Oman ===
- The 2007 International Tent Pegging Championships were held in Muscat, Oman. This event was rare of its kind as each continent was represented by a single national team: Europe by Britain, whose team came from the Household Cavalry and the Royal Horse Artillery; the Middle East by Oman, whose team came from the Royal Cavalry; Asia by Pakistan; Africa by South Africa, whose team had been selected from national civilian trials; the North America by Canada, the whose team was led by Akaash Maharaj and last year's champion, India, whose team came from multiple branches of their armed forces.
- The Penta Grand (2010)- World Tent Pegging Championship Noida, India
- The Penta Grand (2012)-World Equestrian Tent Pegging Championship, Noida India.

World Tent Pegging Championship was hosted by India after almost three decades by Ahmad Afsar, the Global prime Promoter of Equestrian Tent Pegging Discipline and made his mission to get Tent Pegging recognized in the World Stage.

"The Penta Grand" 2012 was the first of its kind and saw participation of 11 countries.

•The Penta Grand (2013)-World Equestrian Tent Pegging Championship, Gurugram India. "The Penta Grand" or The World Equestrian Tent Championship was held at Tau Devi Lal Stadium, Gurugram.It was organized by Mr Ahmad Afsar with Equiwings Sports & Events Company under the Aegis of Equestrian Federation of India (EFI). It had a record number of participation of 17 countries. Because of the presence of officials of 17 countries Mr Ahmad Afsar called a meeting to form World Tent Pegging federation duly supported by Prince Malik Ata Muhammad Khan and all representatives of the 17 countries reached a consensus for the development of tent pegging which later shaped as International Tent Pegging Federation.

•The Penta Grand (2015)-Asian & International Equestrian Tent Pegging Championship(2015), New Delhi. The "Asian & International Tent Pegging Championship" 2015 was held at Gautam Budh University, Gr. Noida, New Delhi from 10 to 15 March 2015 by the Equiwings Sport & Events company. Sudan won the gold medal. The countries participated were India, Sudan, Oman, Iraq, Kazakhstan, Jordan, Russia, United States, Pakistan, Great Britain, Lebanon and Germany.

In this edition of The Penta Grand 2015, the Great Noida Horse show was also organised. It included an open competition for all riders of the country in 68 event disciplines including show jumping, tent pegging, endurance, hacks, and gymkhana events. Various categories for the participation of children were available in the gymkhana events.

•The Penta Grand (2017)

== Notable tent peggers ==
- George Gribble (1868–1947), He won the prize for 'tent pegging on horseback with a lance' at the main military tournament in Dublin. Queen Victoria made the presentation of a silver cup, herself. He was awarded 28 points, with the next best competitor managing just 12.
- Malik Ata Muhammad Khan (1941–2020), Pakistan, One of the founders of International Tent Pegging Federation. He served as first elected honorary president of the federation and then member of the executive committee to serve for four years. He also served as first President of the Equestrian & Tent Pegging Federation of Pakistan. He started participating in international tent pegging events in early 60s and this continued for whole of his life.
- Ahmed H. Zubair (2010–present), Director - Southeast Region New York State Horse Council (2020 – present) introduced the sport of tent pegging to the US while playing polo in Tinicum Park Polo Club in NJ. Tent pegging efforts were encouraged by the polo coach and founder. USTPA participated in tent pegging clinics on the sidelines of the 2010 World Tent Pegging Championship in India; USTPA founder, Ahmed H. Zubair, officiated as one of the judges.
- Dr. Asim Shahzad Malik D.B.A. (2013 – Present) first registered the United States Tent Pegging Federation - USTPF in the United States on 30 December 2013, headquartered in Tulsa, Oklahoma, as legal Tent Pegging Governing Body in order to promote Tent Pegging in the US. USTPF sponsored teams have participated in may international events, which include Oman, Sudan, Norway, Germany, Saudi Arabia and India. Dr. Asim Shahzad Malik is the certified coach from International Tent Pegging Federation - ITPF for Tent Pegging in the US. Currently the USTPF has one registered Associan under the umbrella of the USTPF known as Midwest Tent Pegging Associan from Columbus, Ohio. The President of the MTPA, Mr. Hussnain Ali is certified Gold Judge from the ITPF.https://www.ustpf.org/ustpf-history

== Popular culture references ==
In George McDonald Fraser's Flashman novels, title character Harry Flashman served in a lancer regiment, and frequently mentions tent pegging and his broader skills with the lance.
