= Sunehray Din =

1991 Pakistani television series

- Title screen
- Urdu: سنہرے دن
- Genre: Drama
- Based on: Cadets of PMA
- Directed by: Shoaib Mansoor; Mohsin Ali
- Starring: Saleem Sheikh; Malik Faraz Inam; Kiran Zaman
- Country of origin: Pakistan
- Original language: Urdu
- No. of episodes: 06

Production
- Production locations: Pakistan Military Academy; Karachi; Peshawar; Quetta; Lahore
- Camera setup: Multi-camera setup
- Production companies: Shoman Productions; ISPR

Original release
- Network: PTV
- Release: 1991 – 1991

Related
- Alpha Bravo Charlie; Ehd-e-Wafa

Sunehray Din (transl. Golden Days) is a 1991 coming of age Pakistani television series produced and directed by Shoaib Mansoor and Mohsin Ali under Shoman Productions. The series was co-produced by ISPR. It ran on Pakistan Television Corporation in 1991. The series stars Saleem Sheikh, Kiran Zaman, Mumtaz Musharraf and Alia Kazmi in leading roles and revolves around the lives of the young cadets of Pakistan Military Academy.

== Plot ==
The story revolves around the character of Safeer, who lives a carefree life with his single mother and his grandfather. His mother is worried about his future but Safeer tends to take things lightly. Things do take a turn when Safeer decides to join the army. His overprotective mother first disagrees but seeing the passion of his son towards military decides to let him enlist.

The rest of the story depicts the life of Safeer in Kakul Academy, his training, his friendships and his rivalries. There is also a subplot love story in this series which becomes the reason of neighbour rivalry and comical relief in a lot scenes. The series has been lauded for maintaining a light tone even while discussing serious themes.

== Cast ==
- Saleem Sheikh as Safeer
- Kiran Zaman as Nehri
- Azra Mansoor as Safeer's mother
- Malik Faraz Inam as Faraz
- Hameed Wain as Sultan (Safeer's grandfather)
- Mumtaz Musharraf
- Alia Kazmi

== Sequels ==
In 1998, the series was followed by a sequel titled Alpha Bravo Charlie which was also directed by Mansoor.
