= Yahya Khan =

President of Pakistan from 1969 to 1971

Yahya Khan HJ HPk SPk NePi
- یحییٰ خان
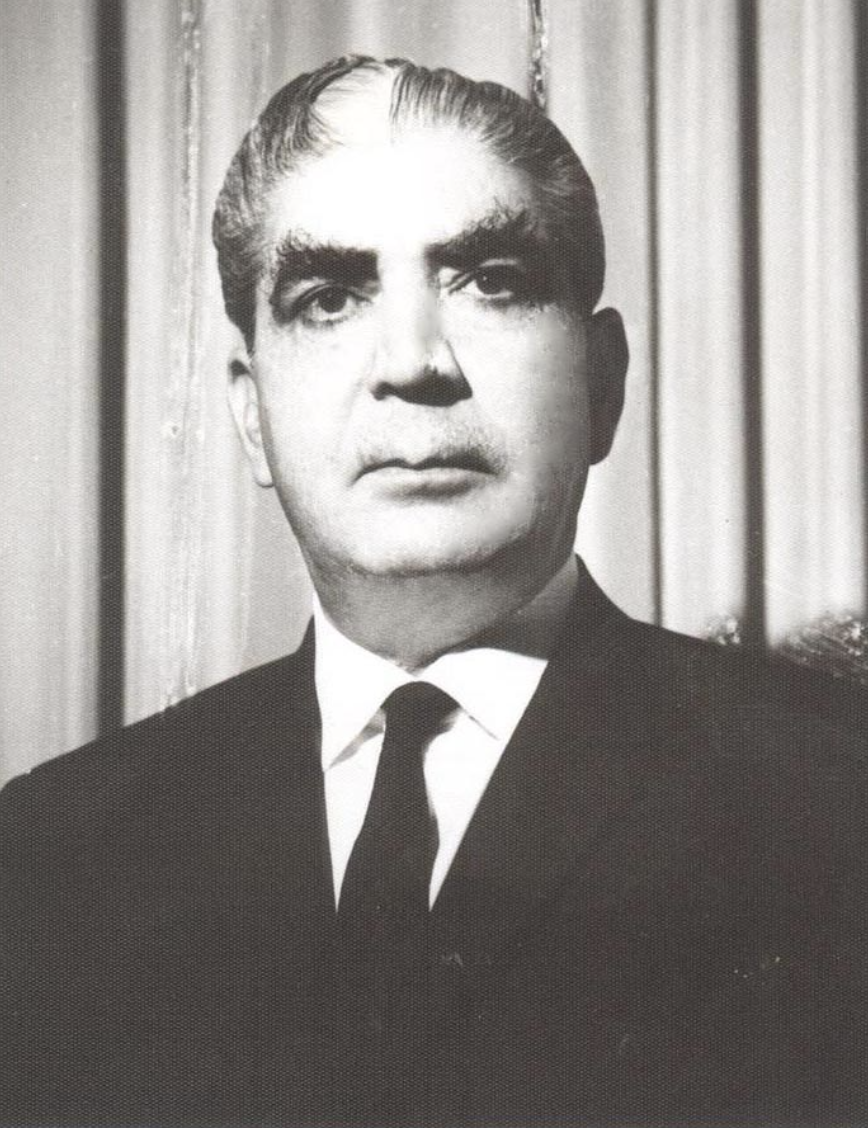
- Official portrait, c. 1969

3rd President of Pakistan 2nd Chief Martial Law Administrator
- In office 25 March 1969 – 20 December 1971
- Prime Minister: Nurul Amin
- Deputy: General Abdul Hamid Khan
- Preceded by: Field Marshal Ayub Khan
- Succeeded by: Zulfikar Ali Bhutto

5th Commander-in-Chief of the Pakistan Army
- In office 18 September 1966 – 19 December 1971
- President: Ayub Khan; Himself
- Prime Minister: Nurul Amin
- Preceded by: Musa Khan
- Succeeded by: Gul Hassan Khan

Personal details
- Born: Agha Muhammad Yahya Khan; 4 February 1917 Chakwal, British India (now in Pakistan)
- Died: 10 August 1980 (aged 63) Rawalpindi, Pakistan
- Resting place: Peshawar, Pakistan
- Spouse: Fakhra Khan
- Domestic partners: Akleem Akhtar (1967–1971); Noor Jehan (1971)
- Children: 2
- Relatives: Agha Muhammad Ali (brother)
- Education: Colonel Brown Cambridge; University of Punjab (BA); Indian Military Academy
- Nickname(s): Muhammad Shah Rangīla (Note: Lazy; Comfortable or He who is in a good mood); Yeah Yeah Can

Military service
- Allegiance: British India; Pakistan
- Branch/service: British Indian Army (1939–1947); Pakistan Army (1947–1971)
- Years of service: 1939–1971
- Rank: General
- Unit: 4/10th Baloch Regiment (S/No. PA – 98)
- Commands: C-in-C of the Pakistan Army; 7th Infantry Division; 105th Independent Brigade
- Battles/wars: World War II; Mediterranean Theatre; Indo-Pakistani War of 1965; Operation Grand Slam; Battle of Chawinda; Bangladesh Liberation War; Operation Searchlight; Indo-Pakistani War of 1971; 1971 Pakistan Military Officer's Revolt
- Awards: Hilal-e-Jurat; Sitara-e-Pakistan; Order of Pahlavi; Hilal-e-Pakistan

Agha Muhammad Yahya Khan (Note: Urdu: آغا محمد یحیٰی خان) (4 February 1917 – 10 August 1980) was a Pakistani four-star rank general who served as the third president of Pakistan from 1969 to 1971, under martial law. His presidency oversaw a civil war in East Pakistan, resulting in Bangladesh's secession. He also served as the fifth commander-in-chief of the Pakistan Army from 1966 to 1971.

Khan was commissioned into the British Indian Army in 1939 and fought in the Second World War in the Mediterranean theatre. Following the partition of British India, he joined the Pakistan Army and was placed in charge of organising the Staff College in Quetta. In 1965, he played a vital role in executing Operation Grand Slam in Indian-administered Kashmir during the second Indo-Pakistani war and was assigned to assume the command of the army in September 1966 by President Ayub Khan. In the wake of nationwide protests against Ayub Khan's government, he resigned from the presidency and transferred authority to Yahya Khan in March 1969.

Upon taking over the presidency, Khan declared martial law and suspended the constitution. He issued the Legal Framework Order in July 1970 and held the country's first general election in December 1970, with which the Awami League from East Pakistan emerged victorious with a national majority. He barred power transition to the party's leader Sheikh Mujibur Rahman, leading to mass protests and civil disobedience in the east and a call for sovereignty. On 25 March 1971, Khan ordered Operation Searchlight in an effort to suppress Bengali nationalism which initiated a genocide; and led to the declaration of independence of East Pakistan as Bangladesh by Sheikh Mujibur Rahman, and start of a civil war in the east. He is considered a chief architect of the Bangladesh genocide along with his deputies Abdul Hamid Khan and Tikka Khan. In December 1971, Khan ordered pre-emptive strikes against the Mukti Bahini-allied Indian Army, resulting in another war with India. The two simultaneous wars resulted in the surrender of Pakistani forces in the east and Bangladesh's secession, after which Yahya Khan resigned from the army command and transferred the presidency to Zulfikar Ali Bhutto. Khan remained under house surveillance prior to 1979 when he was released by Fazle Haq. Khan died the following year in Rawalpindi and was buried in Peshawar.

Khan's brief period in power is widely regarded as a pivotal factor in the division of Pakistan. His refusal to hand over power to the Awami League, despite their electoral victory in East Pakistan, sparked political unrest. This culminated in Operation Searchlight: a brutal military crackdown resulting in the Bengali genocide and causing widespread death and displacement. Khan is viewed negatively in both Bangladesh, where he is considered the architect of the genocide, and Pakistan, where his failure to prevent the country's disintegration is regarded as a national tragedy.

== Early life and education ==
Yahya Khan, whose full name was Agha Muhammad Yahya Khan Qizilbash, was born during the British Raj, on 4 February 1917 in the town of Chakwal. Born in a Qizilbash family from Peshawar, he was also described as a Pashtun and claimed descent from the elite soldiers of Iranian conqueror Nader Shah (r. 1736–1747). Yahya Khan also spoke Persian.

Few Pakistanis knew anything about Yahya Khan when he was vaulted into the presidency two years ago. The stocky, bushy–browed Pathan had been the army chief of staff since 1966... Yahya (pronounced Ya-hee-uh) Khan claims direct descent from warrior nobles who fought in the elite armies of Nader Shah, the Persian adventurer who conquered Delhi in the 18th century.

— Editorial, Time, 2 August 1971

Yahya's father, Saadat Ali Khan (b. 28 Nov 1883), was originally from Peshawar. Saadat Ali Khan worked in the Indian Imperial Police, in the Punjab Province. He joined as a head constable and retired as a deputy superintendent in 1938. He was posted in Chakwal when Yahya Khan was born. Saadat was rewarded with the title of Khan Sahib for having disposed of the bodies of many independence activists, including Bhagat Singh, as they were executed in secrecy and the colonial authorities wanted to dispose of the corpses without attracting much attention, operations Saadat Ali Khan carried out "efficiently and faithfully."

Their family house, built in 1890, is located in the Muhallah Shaikh Ul Islam street of Ganj area in Peshawar's Walled City, once serving as the main administrative area. Yahya studied in the prestigious Colonel Brown Cambridge School in Dehradun and later enrolled at the University of the Punjab in Lahore, from where he graduated with a B.A. degree, finishing first in his class.

== Military career (1939–1969) ==
=== British Indian Army (1939–1947) ===
Yahya Khan was commissioned into the British Indian Army from the Indian Military Academy, Dehradun on 15 July 1939, his date of commission was later antedated to 28 August 1938. An infantry officer from the 4th/10th Baluch Regiment (4th Battalion of 10th Baluch Regiment, later amalgamated with the modern and current form of Baloch Regiment, 'Baloch' was spelled as 'Baluch' in Yahya's time), Yahya saw action during World War II in North Africa where he was captured by the Axis Forces in June 1942 and interned in a prisoner of war camp in Italy from where he escaped in the third attempt.

Yahya Khan served in World War II as a lieutenant and later captain in the 4th Infantry Division (India). He served in Iraq, Italy and North Africa.

=== Pakistan Army (1947–1971) ===
After the partition of India, he decided to join the Pakistan Army in August 1947, he had already reached the rank of major (acting lieutenant-colonel). In this year, he was instrumental in not letting the Indian officers remove books from the library of the Staff College, Quetta where Yahya was posted as an instructor at the time of the partition. He renamed the 'Command and Staff College' from 'Army Staff College'. At the age of 34, he was promoted to Brigadier, then the youngest Brigadier of Pakistan. And then he was appointed as commander of the 105th Independent Brigade that was deployed in LoC ceasefire region in Jammu and Kashmir in 1951–1952.

Later Yahya Khan, as Vice Chief of General Staff, was selected to head of the army's planning board set up by General Ayub Khan to modernise the Pakistan Army in 1954–57. Yahya also performed the duties of Chief of General Staff from 1957 to 1962 from where he went on to command two infantry divisions from 1962 to 1965. He played a pivotal role in sustaining the support for Ayub Khan's campaign in the 1965 presidential elections against Fatima Jinnah. He was made GOC of the 7th Infantry Division of the Pakistan Army, which he commanded during the 1965 war with India.

During these years, Yahya was also tasked in civil and administrative matters, including being the Administrator of the Islamabad Capital Project, "the job for major execution" being given to him.

==== Commander-in-Chief (1966-1971) ====
Yahya became the Pakistan Army's C-in-C on 18 September 1966 when General Musa Khan retired. Yahya superseded two of his seniors: Lieutenant-General Altaf Qadir and Lieutenant-General Bakhtiar Rana.

After becoming the commander-in-chief of the army, Yahya energetically started reorganising the Pakistan Army in 1966. The post-1965 situation saw major organisational and technical changes in the Pakistan Army. Until 1965, it was thought that divisions could function effectively while getting orders directly from the army's GHQ. This idea failed miserably in the 1965 war, and the need to have intermediate corps headquarters in between the GHQ and the fighting combat divisions was recognised as a foremost operational necessity after the 1965 war. In the 1965 war, the Pakistan Army had only one corps headquarters (the 1 Corps).

Soon after the war had started, the United States had imposed an embargo on military aid to both India and Pakistan. This embargo did not affect the Indian Army but produced major changes in the Pakistan Army's technical composition. US Secretary of State Dean Rusk well summed it up when he said, "Well if you are going to fight, go ahead and fight, but we're not going to pay for it".

Pakistan now turned to China for military aid, and the Chinese tank T-59 started replacing the US M-47/48 tanks as the Pakistan Army's MBT (Main Battle Tank) from 1966. 80 tanks, the first batch of T-59s, a version of the Russian T-54/55 series were delivered to Pakistan in 1965–66. The first batch was displayed in the Joint Services Day Parade on 23 March 1966. The 1965 War had proved that Pakistan Army's tank-infantry ratio was lopsided and more infantry was required. Three more infantry divisions (9, 16 and 17 Divisions) largely equipped with Chinese equipment and popularly referred to by the rank and file as "The China Divisions" were raised by the beginning of 1968. Two more corps headquarters: the 2 Corps Headquarters (Jhelum-Ravi Corridor) and the 4 Corps Headquarters (Ravi-Sutlej Corridor) were raised, also in East Pakistan a corps-sized formation (which was titled as the Eastern Command) was created.

== Presidency (1969–1971) ==
A sustained anti-regime mass movement began in the fall of 1968 in West Pakistan. The uprising spread to East Pakistan and gathered strength, adding to a tense political climate that had worsened following President Ayub Khan's implementation of the 1966 Tashkent Agreement and sacking of Foreign Minister Zulfikar Ali Bhutto. Ayub Khan tried to quell the revolt by making concessions to opposition groups including the Pakistan Peoples Party (PPP) and the Awami League (AL), but demonstrations continued.

Rather than resigning and allowing a constitutional transfer of power, Ayub Khan requested that Yahya Khan, Commander-in-Chief of the Army, utilise the military's supra-constitutional authority to declare martial law and take power. On 24 March 1969, Ayub directed a letter to Yahya inviting him to deal with the crisis, as it was "beyond the capacity of [civil] government to deal with the... complex situation." Some sources claim Yahya accepted Ayub's proposal on 25 March. On 26 March 1969, General Yahya appeared on national television and announced a state of martial law throughout the entirety of the country. The 1962 constitution was abrogated, the parliament was dissolved, and Ayub's civilian officials were dismissed. In his first nationwide address, Yahya maintained, "I will not tolerate disorder, let everyone remain at his post."

Yahya Khan's new military government featured several active duty military officials:

Yahya Khan administration
Ministers	Portrait	Ministries and departments	Inter-services
General Yahya Khan		President and Chief Martial Law Administrator; Information and Broadcasting; Law and Justice; Foreign and Defence	Pakistan Army
General Abdul Hamid Khan		Deputy CMLA; Interior and Kashmir Affairs	Pakistan Army
Vice-Admiral S. M. Ahsan		Deputy CMLA; Finance and Planning Commission; Statistics, Commerce, and Industry	Pakistan Navy
Air Marshal Nur Khan		Deputy CMLA; Communications and Health; Labour and Science and Technology	Pakistan Air Force

When Yahya Khan assumed the office on 25 March, he inherited a two-decade constitutional problem of inter-provincial ethnic rivalry between West Pakistan, which was almost exclusively Muslim and was dominated by the Punjabi-Pashtun-Mohajir peoples, and East Pakistan, whose population was largely ethnically Bengali and approximately three-fourths Muslim (as of the 1961 Census). In addition, Yahya also inherited the challenge of transforming a country essentially ruled by one man into a democratic country, which was the ideological basis of the anti-Ayub movement of 1968–69. Once in office, Yahya Khan was tasked with leading the country, drafting of a provisional constitution, resolving the One Unit question, and satisfying the frustrations and the sense of exploitation stirring in the "East Wing" (East Pakistan) by government policies since 1948.

The American political scientist Lawrence Ziring observed:

Yahya Khan has been widely portrayed as a ruthless uncompromising insensitive and grossly inept leader.... While Yahya cannot escape responsibility for these tragic events, it is also on the record that he did not act alone.... All the major actors of the period were creatures of a historic legacy and a psycho-political milieu which did not lend itself to accommodation and compromise, to bargaining and a reasoned settlement. Nurtured on conspiracy theories, they were all conditioned to act in a manner that neglected agreeable solutions and promoted violent judgments.

Yahya Khan attempted to solve Pakistan's constitutional and inter-provincial rivalry problems once he took over power from Ayub Khan in March 1969. His earlier initiatives were directed at establishing the National Security Council (NSC), with Major-General Ghulam Omar as its first advisor. It was formed to analyse and prepare assessments towards issues of political and national security.

M.M. Ahmad, then Deputy Chairman of the Planning Commission of Pakistan told Henry Kissinger that the state "had now realized that it would have to sacrifice some of its economic growth rate for the sake of social reform and of meeting the problem of disparity in the allocation of resources" between the two wings, and noted that the loss of direct US military aid meant "Pakistan had had to cut back resources devoted to the development budget in order to finance the procurement of military equipment." In 1971, Yahya conceded that he had failed to improve the national economy, "I inherited a bad economy, and I am going to pass it on," he noted. The military government-initiated talks with the International Monetary Fund after foreign reserves fell to $160 million. In 1968, Muhajirs from East Pakistan started Muhjairland movement for a separated province. However, Yahya Khan rejected the idea saying it would not bring them solution.

In 1969, President Yahya also promulgated the Legal Framework Order, 1970, which disestablished the One Unit Scheme that had formed West Pakistan and returned the provinces of West Pakistan to their pre-1955 configuration. The decree had no effect on East Pakistan. However, the dissolution of the One Unit policy did not lead to the positive results that it might have yielded if withdrawn earlier. Yahya also made an attempt to accommodate the East Pakistanis by abolishing the principle of parity, in the hope that a greater share in the assembly would redress their wounded ethnic regional pride and ensure the integrity of Pakistan. Instead of satisfying the Bengalis, it intensified their vocalness for separatism, causing a further rise in anti-West Wing sentiment in the East Wing.

=== 1970 general election ===
By 28 July 1969, President Yahya Khan had set a framework for elections that were to be held in December 1970, with Judge Abdus Sattar appointed as Chief Election Commissioner of the Election Commission of Pakistan. On 7 December, the general elections were held all over the country. In East Pakistan, the Awami League, led by Sheikh Mujibur Rahman, held almost all seats but no seat in any of four provinces of West Pakistan. The socialist Pakistan Peoples Party (PPP) had won the exclusive mandate in four provinces of West Pakistan but none in East Pakistan. The Pakistan Muslim League (PML), led by Nurul Amin, was the only party to have representation from all over the country, but it failed to gain the mandate to run the government. The Awami League had 160 seats in the National Assembly, all won from East Pakistan; the socialist PPP had 81, and the conservative PML had 10. The general elections's results reflected the ugly political reality: the Pakistani electorate was deeply polarised along regional lines, particularly between East Pakistan and West Pakistan.

As a result, Pakistan stood politically divided. A series of bilateral talks between the PPP and Mujibur Rahman produced no results and were unable to come to an agreement regarding any transfer of power from West Pakistan's representatives to East Pakistan's, on the basis of the six-point programme. West Pakistan politicians generally felt that the proposed six-point programme was a step towards East Pakistan's full secession.

=== Bangladesh War ===
While the political deadlock continued between the Awami League, the PPP, and the military government after the general elections in 1970, Yahya Khan began coordinating with his military strategists concerning ongoing dissent in East Pakistan. Both Yahya Khan and Bhutto flew to Dhaka and tried negotiations one more time in mid-March 1971, but they ultimately yielded no results.

On 25 March 1971, Yahya initiated Operation Searchlight, a crackdown by the Pakistan Armed Forces to suppress Bangali rebellion and the Bengali nationalist movement. It was seen as the sequel to Operation Blitz, which had been launched in November 1970. The Pakistani government's view was that it had to launch a campaign to neutralise a rebellion in East Pakistan to save the unity of Pakistan.

As a result of Operation Searchlight, agitation turned into full-scale civil war as Bengali members of the Pakistan Armed Forces and the police mutinied, forming the Mukti Bahini along with members of the general public, with the goal of launching unconventional and hit-and-run operations. A government-in-exile formed across the border in India and proclaimed the independent state of Bangladesh, appointing Sheikh Mujibur Rahman as its head despite him being in a West Pakistan prison at the time.

Violent disorder and chaos accompanied the Pakistan Army's systematic and deliberate campaign of killing and raping the populace of East Pakistan. The original plan for Operation Searchlight envisioned taking control of the major cities on 26 March 1971 and then eliminating all opposition, political or military within one month. The prolonged Bengali resistance had not been anticipated by Pakistani planners, however. The main phase of Operation Searchlight ended with the fall of the last major town in Bengali hands in mid-May.

Sam Manekshaw on Yahya Khan

Yahya never paid me the Rs1,000 for my motorbike, but now he has paid [the amount] with half [of] his country.

— SHFJ Manekshaw, Indian army Field Marshal in an interview to Pakistani columnist Ardeshir Cowasjee, 2008,

The total number of people killed in East Pakistan is not known with any degree of accuracy. Bangladeshi authorities claim that 3 million people were killed, while the Hamoodur Rahman Commission, an official Pakistani Government investigation, put the figure as low as 26,000 civilian casualties. In her widely discredited book Dead Reckoning: Memories of the 1971 Bangladesh War, Sarmila Bose said between 50,000 and 100,000 combatants and civilians were killed by both sides during the war. A 2008 British Medical Journal study by Ziad Obermeyer, Christopher J. L. Murray, and Emmanuela Gakidou estimated that up to 269,000 civilians died as a result of the conflict; the authors note that this is far higher than a previous estimate of 58,000 put forward by Uppsala University and the Peace Research Institute in Oslo.

General Yahya Khan arrested Sheikh Mujibur Rahman on charges of sedition and appointed Brigadier (later General) Rahimuddin Khan to preside over a special tribunal dealing with Mujib's case. Rahimuddin gave Mujib the death sentence, but President Yahya put the verdict into abeyance. Yahya's crackdown, however, had led to the Bangladesh Liberation War within Pakistan. India would eventually be drawn into said war, fighting on behalf of the Bangladeshis against Pakistan; the war would later extend into the Indo-Pakistani war of 1971.

The consequences of the war were mainly that East Pakistan became independent as Bangladesh, and that India captured approximately 15,000 square kilometres (5,800 mi^{2}) of land previously in West Pakistan. However, the captured territory was given back to Pakistan in the Simla Agreement signed on 2 July 1972 between Indira Gandhi and Zulfikar Ali Bhutto.

The 1971 war led to increased tensions between Pakistan and India, although Pakistan recognised the independence of Bangladesh following severe pressure from the Organisation of Islamic Cooperation.

=== US role ===
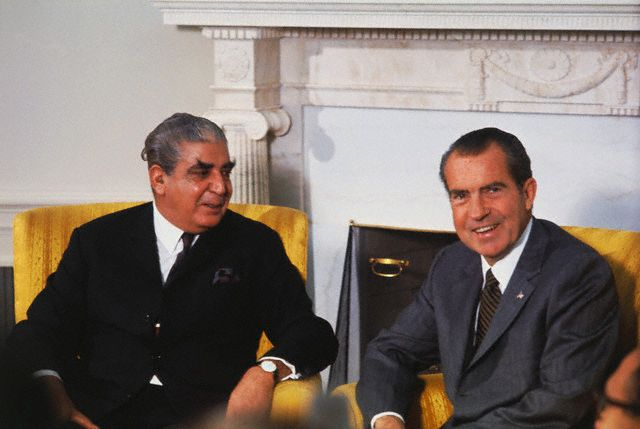
President Yahya Khan with United States President Richard Nixon in October 1970

The United States had been a major sponsor of Yahya's military government. American journalist Gary Bass notes in The Blood Telegram: Nixon, Kissinger, and a Forgotten Genocide, "Nixon liked very few people, but he did like General Agha Muhammad Yahya Khan." Personal initiatives of Yahya had helped to establish the communication channel between the United States and China, which would be used to set up the Nixon's trip in 1972.

Since 1960, Pakistan was perceived in the United States as an integral bulwark against global Communism in the Cold War. The United States cautiously supported Pakistan during the 1971 conflict, although Congress kept an arms embargo in place. The economically-socialist India entered into a formal alliance with the Soviet Union in August 1971.

Nixon urged Yahya Khan multiple times to exercise restraint. His objective was to prevent a war and safeguard Pakistan's interests, though he feared an Indian invasion of Pakistan that would lead to Indian domination of the subcontinent and strengthen the position of the Soviet Union. Similarly, President Yahya feared that an independent Bangladesh could lead to the disintegration of Pakistan, and said publicly in August 1971 that Indian military support for Bengali guerrillas could lead to war between India and Pakistan.

In November 1971, Indian Prime Minister Indira Gandhi met Nixon in Washington. She assured him that she didn't want war with Pakistan, but he did not believe her. Witness accounts presented by Kissinger pointed out that Nixon made specific proposals to Prime Minister Gandhi on a solution for the crisis, some of which she heard for the first time, including a mutual withdrawal of troops from the Indo-East Pakistan borders. Nixon also expressed a wish to fix a time limit with Yahya for political accommodation in East Pakistan. Nixon asserted that India could count on US endeavors to ease the crisis within a short time. But, both Kissinger and Gandhi's aide Jayakar maintained, Gandhi did not respond to these proposals. Kissinger noted that she "listened to what was, in fact, one of Nixon's better presentations with aloof indifference" but "took up none of the points." Jayakar pointed out that Gandhi listened to Nixon "without a single comment, creating an impregnable space so that no real contact was possible." She also refrained from assuring Nixon that India would follow Pakistan's suit if it withdrew from India's borders. As a result, the main agenda was "dropped altogether."

On 21 November, the Indian Army started incursions in East Pakistan. Khan responded to this by preemptively attacking the Indian Air Force on 3 December 1971, and Gandhi retaliated, pushing into East Pakistan. Nixon issued a statement blaming Pakistan for starting the conflict and blaming India for escalating it. He favoured a cease-fire. The United States was secretly encouraging the shipment of military equipment from Iran, Turkey, and Jordan to Pakistan, offering to replenish those countries' weapons stocks later despite Congressional objections. The US used the threat of an aid cut-off to force Pakistan to back down, while its continued military aid to Islamabad prevented India from launching incursions deeper into the country. Pakistani forces in East Pakistan surrendered in Dhaka on 16 December 1971, leading to the creation of the independent state of Bangladesh.

=== Fall from power ===
When the news of Pakistan's surrender was broadcast by West Pakistani media, the spontaneous and overwhelming public anger over the nation's defeat by Bangladeshi rebels and the Indian Army, and over the breakup of Pakistan into two parts, boiled into street demonstrations throughout Pakistan. Rumors of an impending coup d'état by junior military officers against President Yahya Khan swept the country. To forestall further unrest, on 20 December 1971, he handed over the presidency and government to Zulfikar Ali Bhutto, the ambitious leader of the (at that time) powerful and popular People's Party. Yahya became the highest-ranking official in what remained of Pakistan to be forced out due to the war.

Within hours of Yahya Khan stepping down, President Bhutto reversed the Judge Advocate General Branch's verdict against Sheikh Mujibur Rahman and instead released him, allowing him to fly to London. President Bhutto also issued orders for the house arrest of Yahya, the man who imprisoned Mujib in the first place. Both actions made news headlines around the world.

== Later years ==
=== House arrest ===
Yahya Khan was placed under house arrest by the succeeding administration of Zulfikar Ali Bhutto. Initially, Yahya was confined to the Banni rest-house, a forest bungalow near Kharian, without a formal detention order. This location was selected to ensure his isolation and protection as well as to facilitate his forthcoming testimony before the Hamoodur Rahman Commission, which was established on 26 December 1971, to investigate the circumstances leading to Pakistan's military and political failures in East Pakistan.

On 11 January 1972, Chief Justice Hamoodur Rahman sent a letter to Yahya, informing him that the commission would commence its proceedings on 17 January and requesting his statement by 24 January. After approximately four months in Banni, on 20 April 1972, Yahya was transferred to his personal residence at 61 Harley Street in central Rawalpindi. His house arrest continued under lessened restrictions. The house was only thinly guarded by a few police officers.

=== Death ===
Khan suffered a stroke which left him half paralysed Yahya remained under house arrest until 1977, when he was released from custody by martial law administrator General Fazle Haq due to his failing health. He stayed out from public events and wrote down his memoirs in the form of notes that remain unpublished. He died on 10 August 1980 in Rawalpindi, Punjab. His funeral was marked by military honours.

== Personal life ==
=== Religion ===
He was nominally a Shia Muslim, but was non-practising and was known to have indulged in activities prohibited in Islam such as womanising and the consumption of alcoholic beverages. Indian journalist Dewan Berindranath argued that Yahya turned to alcohol and womanising when he gained power, as a coping mechanism to deal with stress, and that when he was a soldier he was known for being morally upright, abstaining from partying unlike other officers and instead preferring to spend time with his family and also practicing Islamic rituals such as the fast of Ramadan. He eventually quoted Ayub Khan, who said that "Give me half a dozen officers of the calibre and moral standards of Yahya Khan and I can show you what can Pakistan do as a great nation of the Islamic world."

During his rule from 1969 to 1971, Mian Tufail Mohammad, a prominent leader of the Jamaat-e-Islami, the country's main Islamist party, hailed Yahya as "the champion of Islam", as there was a general view among Islamists that he would fight leftist elements of the country (the Pakistan People's Party in West Pakistan and the All-Pakistan Awami League in what was East Pakistan and now Bangladesh) and also push for the Islamisation of the Constitution. More generally, Yahya used the intelligence services (the ISI and the IB) "to keep secular political parties under check", mobilising the Information Ministry for propaganda and pushing the idea that they put "Islam and Pakistan in danger."

Towards the end of his life, during and following his imprisonment, Yahya gradually stopped drinking alcohol as he "became very religious."

=== Relationships ===
Yahya is said to have had a relationship with Akleem Akhtar, nicknamed General Rani, but they never married. His name was linked with the singer and actress Noor Jehan as well. He also had a brief relationship with a Bengali woman called Shamim K. Hussain, also known as Black Beauty. The wife of a police officer, Yahya appreciated her company not so much for her looks but mainly because she was fluent in English and could talk about Shakespeare and Lord Byron, among his favourite poets, and she eventually became influential enough to shape the decisions of the foreign office.

=== Family ===
Yahya's older brother Agha Muhammad Ali Khan had been the Chief of the Intelligence Bureau. Having joined government service in 1935 as Police Inspector, he would later serve as Superintendent (SP) in cities such as Lahore.

Yahya and his wife Fakhra, whom he married in 1945, had a son and a daughter. His son, Agha Ali Yahya Qizilbash, died on 6 July 2012 at the age of 67 in Rawalpindi.

=== Hobbies ===
A Time editorial writer wrote of Yahya in 1971, "His only known interest, outside of the military, is birds—all varieties." Yahya kept Australian parrots, cranes and swans at the President’s House.

However, Yahya also had a keen interest in poetry, particularly the works of Shakespeare and Lord Byron. He often engaged in discussions about these poets, especially appreciating conversations with individuals fluent in English who could converse on such literary topics.

== Legacy ==
=== In Pakistan ===
Yahya Khan was awarded HPk, HJ, SPk, NePl but then stripped of his service honours by the Zulfikar Ali Bhutto regime. Khan is viewed largely negatively by Pakistani historians and is considered among the worst but also one of the most misunderstood of the country's leaders. His rule is widely regarded as one of the leading causes of the fall of Dhaka and the breakup of Pakistan, but not entirely of his own making.

=== In the United States ===
In the United States, he has been appreciated for facilitating the American opening to China, Richard Nixon sending a handwritten letter to him, stating that "without your personal assistance the profound breakthrough in relations between the USA and the Peoples Republic of China would never have been accomplished... Those who want a more peaceful world in the generations to come will be forever in your debt."

== In popular culture ==
- In 1971, he was portrayed as a monstrous beast in "ANNIHILATE THESE DEMONS", a poster illustrated by Quamrul Hassan.
- In the 2023 Indian film Gadar 2, Khan is portrayed by Manoj Bakshi.
- In the 2023 Indian film Sam Bahadur, Khan is portrayed by Mohammed Zeeshan Ayyub.
- In the 2026 Indian film Border 2, Khan is portrayed by Madhur Arora.

== Book ==
- The Breaking of Pakistan: Yahya Speaks about the Bhutto-Mujib Interaction which Broke Pakistan, Lahore: Liberty Publishers, 1997, 184 p.

== See also ==
- 1971 Pakistan Military Officer's Revolt

== Bibliography ==
- Bass, Gary J. (2013). The Blood Telegram: Nixon, Kissinger, and a Forgotten Genocide. New York: Alfred A. Knopf. ISBN 978-0-3077-0020-9.
- Berindranath, Dewan (1974). Private Life of Yahya Khan. New Delhi: Sterling Publishers.
- Bhargava, G.S. (1972). "Crush India"--Gen. Yahya Khan Or, Pakistan's Death Wish. Indian School Supply Depot.
- Black, Conrad (2007). Richard M. Nixon: A Life in Full. New York: PublicAffairs. ISBN 978-1-5864-8674-7.
- Kassim, Husain (2006). "Yahya Khan, Aga Muhammad". In Leonard, Thomas M. (ed.). Encyclopedia of the Developing World. Vol. 3. Routledge. p. 1745. ISBN 978-0-4159-7664-0.
- Mukerjee, Dilip (1972). Yahya Khan's "Final War": India Meets Pakistan's Threat. Times of India.
- Raghavan, Srinath (2013). 1971: A Global History of the Creation of Bangladesh. Harvard University Press. p. 24. ISBN 978-0-6747-2864-6. "The promotion was all the more remarkable given that Yahya was a Shia in the predominantly Sunni officer corps."
- Siddiqui, A. R. (2020). General Agha Mohammad Yahya Khan: The Rise & Fall of a Soldier, 1947-1971. Oxford University Press.
- Zaman, Muhammad Qasim (2020). Islam in Pakistan: A History. Princeton University Press.

Military offices
Preceded by Sher Ali Khan Pataudi	Chief of General Staff; 1957–1962	Succeeded by Malik Sher Bahadur
Preceded by Muhammad Musa	C-in-C of the Pakistan Army; 1966–1971	Succeeded by Gul Hassan Khan
Political offices
Preceded by Field Marshal Ayub Khan	President of Pakistan; 1969–1971	Succeeded by Zulfikar Ali Bhutto
Preceded by Field Marshal Ayub Khan	Chief Martial Law Administrator; 1969–1971	Succeeded by Zulfikar Ali Bhutto
Preceded by Mian Arshad Hussain	Minister of Foreign Affairs; 1969–1971	Succeeded by Zulfikar Ali Bhutto
Preceded by Afzal Rahman Khan	Minister of Defence; 1969–1971	Succeeded by Zulfikar Ali Bhutto
