= Malik Ata Muhammad Khan =

Pakistani feudal lord and politician (1941–2020)

Malik Ata Muhammad Khan ملک عطا محمد خان
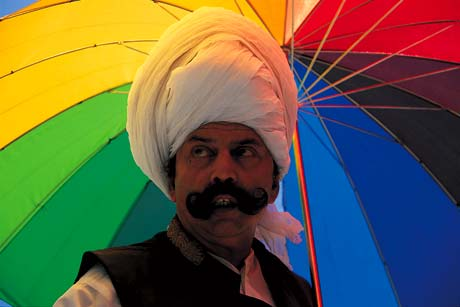

Personal details
- Born: Malik Ata Muhammad Khan; 25 October 1937 Punjab, British India
- Died: 6 February 2020 (aged 82) Attock, Punjab, Pakistan
- Citizenship: Pakistan

Malik Ata Muhammad Khan (Urdu, Punjabi: ملک عطا محمد خان, 25 October 1937 – 6 February 2020), popularly known as Prince Malik Ata, was a Pakistani politician and feudal lord from Attock District in Punjab, Pakistan. He was a member of the Punjab Assembly between 1990 and 1993.

Malik Ata was known for his equestrian hobbies. He was the first elected President of the Equestrian & Tent Pegging Federation of Pakistan. He was well known in Pakistan for his efforts to promote tent pegging and bull races. Ata was one of the founders of the International Tent Pegging Federation which is recognised by the FEI. He was the Vice-President of International Tent Pegging Federation.

== Background ==
He was a son of Malik Yar Muhammad Khan and the eldest son of Sardar Muhammad Nawaz Khan Gheba, who was the chief of the Gheba tribe. Malik Ata was married to a daughter of Nawab of Kalabagh. He died in 2020, and the estate of Kot Fateh Khan was passed down to his younger brother Nawab Malik Saeed and his nephew Nawab Malik Muhammad Ali.

== Political career ==
In 1988, he contested election on the Islami Jamhoori Ittihad (IJI) platform. Thereafter in 1990, Malik Ata Muhammad Khan again contested the election from his home constituency (PP-15 – Attock) and was elected and served the Provincial Assembly of the Punjab from 5 November 1990 to 28 June 1993. After his father's death in 1996, he assumed the responsibilities of the family and management of the estate, hence why he was unable to continue his political career.

== Participation in international events ==
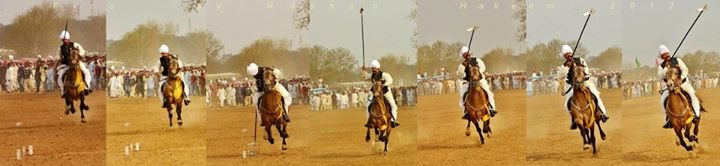
Malik Ata's style of tent pegging (step by step)

Malik Ata had taken part in tent pegging and other equestrian championships in Europe, South Africa, Australia, the United States and India.

When the horse is running 65 to 70 miles per hour and you have to pick a small, one-inch peg from the ground it is very spectacular, either with the sword or with the lance"

— Malik Ata recalls the events of Delhi 1982 at Barkah Equestrian Ground,

- In 1982, Ata participated in the Ninth Asian Games held in Delhi, winning the silver medal for Pakistan.
- Ata with Pakistan team took part in 1982 Hyde Park games in London.
- Ata led Pakistan tent pegging team at the annual Royal Adelaide Show 2010 held in Adelaide, South Australia.
- Ata led the Pakistan team in the Penta Grand World Equestrian Tent Pegging Championship in 2010, 2012 and 2013.

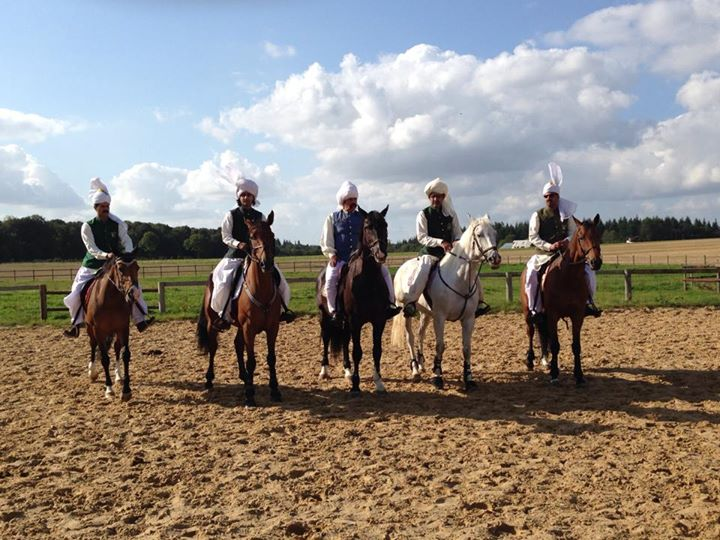
Malik Ata with Pakistan team at world equestrian games France 2014

- Ata was invited by the FEI to give a demonstration of tent pegging at the 2014 FEI World Equestrian Games held in Normandy, France. On the opening day he was honoured to lead all the countries of the world with the Pakistani flag held.
- An international tent pegging competition was held in February 2013 at University of Agriculture, Faisalabad. This was the first time more than two international teams visited Pakistan to participate in an international event, with the competitors being England, Pakistan, South Africa and a United Nations team. The teams were invited by Malik Ata who was the chief organiser.

== International Tent Pegging Federation ==
In his preliminary address at the 2013 World Equestrian Tent Pegging Championship held in Gurgaon, India, Ata expressed the desire for a world organisation to address the FEI. The participants created the World Tent Pegging Federation, of which Ata was elected honorary president. At the second World Tent Pegging Federation Meeting held in Oman on 27 October 2013, Ata was elected a member of the Executive Committee to serve for four years.

== Media appearances ==
He was mentioned in BBC series Michael Palin's Himalaya production. Michael Palin during his trip to South Asia visited Malik Ata's home town. He witnessed some traditional activities and bulls race event there.

He was the subject of a short documentary produced by the BBC entitled "One Man and his Horse" in 1983.

Malik Ata was also subject of a documentary "Malik Ata and his love for the traditional sports". It was presented by Trans World Sport Channel with the co operation of BBC. Producer Sophia Swire along with her team visited traditional bulls at Kot Fateh Khan.

He also appeared in PTV's 1998 drama Alpha Bravo Charlie produced by ISPR and directed by Pakistani drama and film director Shoaib Mansoor.

He appeared in the movie "Verna", played the role of a governor (released on 17 November 2017). Many scenes have been shot in his haveli at Kot Fateh Khan.

== Photo gallery ==
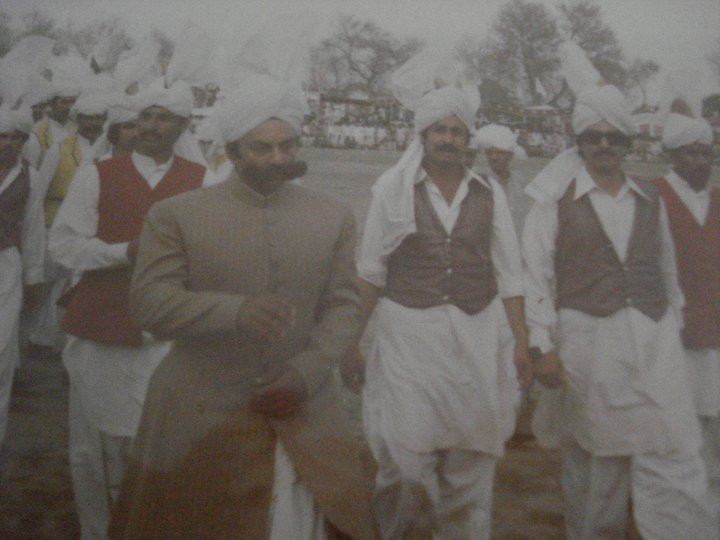
Malik Ata Muhammad Khan at Horse and Cattle Show Attock, 1982

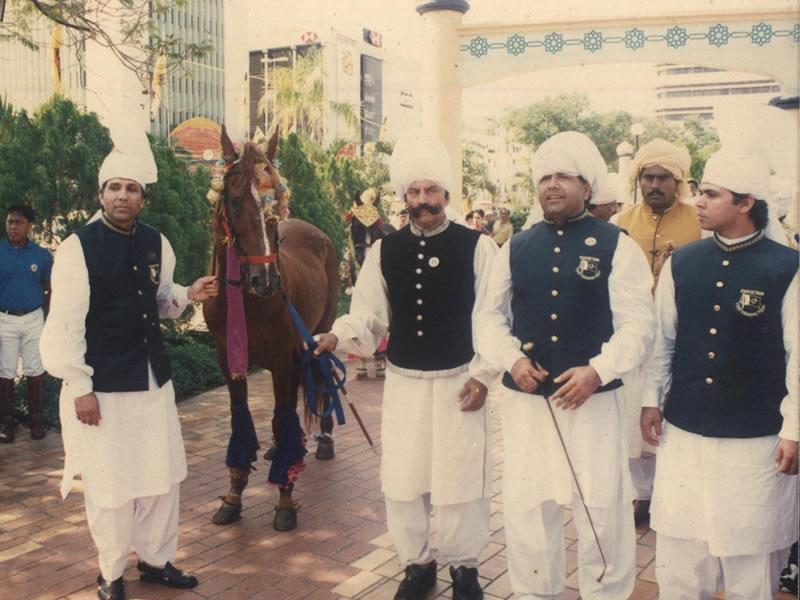
Malik Ata with Amer Munawar

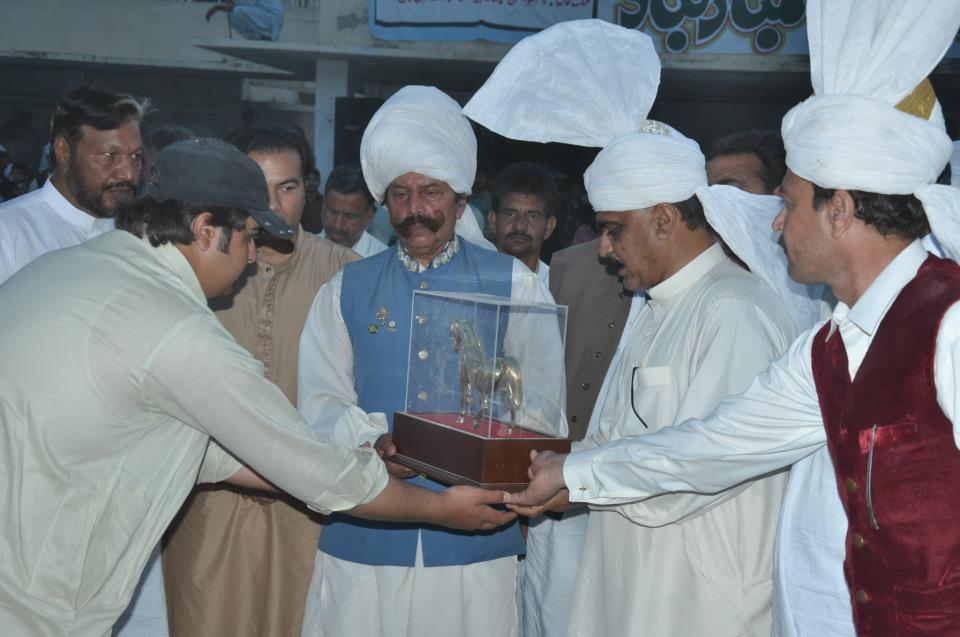
Malik Sher Afzal giving medal to Malik Ata Muhammad Khan at Attock Mela April 2013

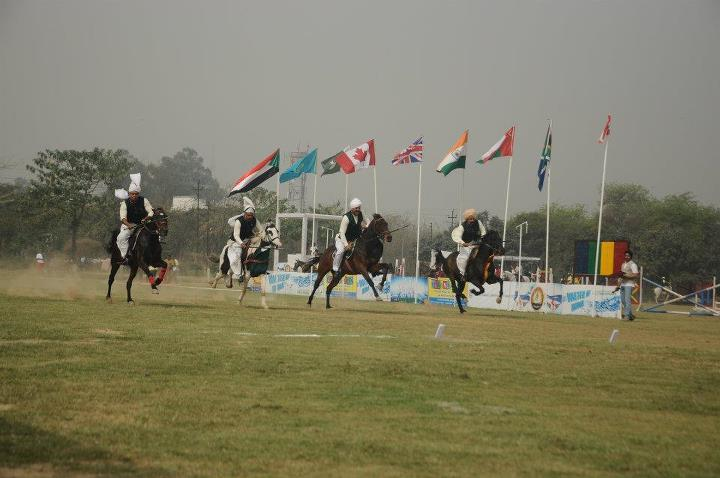
Malik Ata and Pak team at World Equestrian Championship India 2012

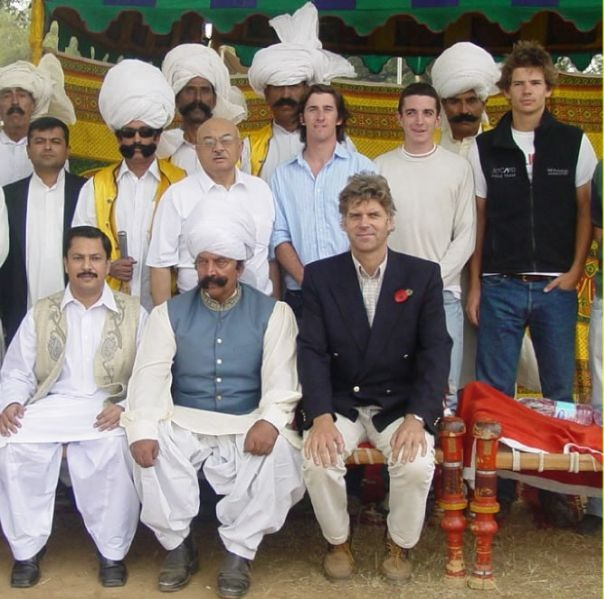
Malik Ata and others enjoying the competition

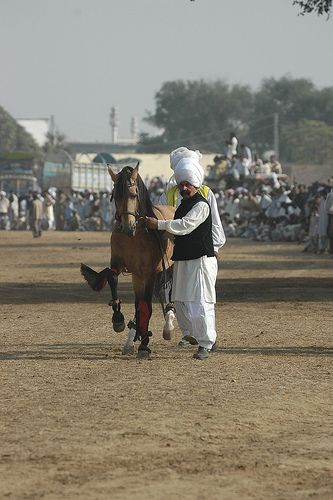
Malik Ata with one of his dancing horses at Kot Fateh Khan Mela 2008

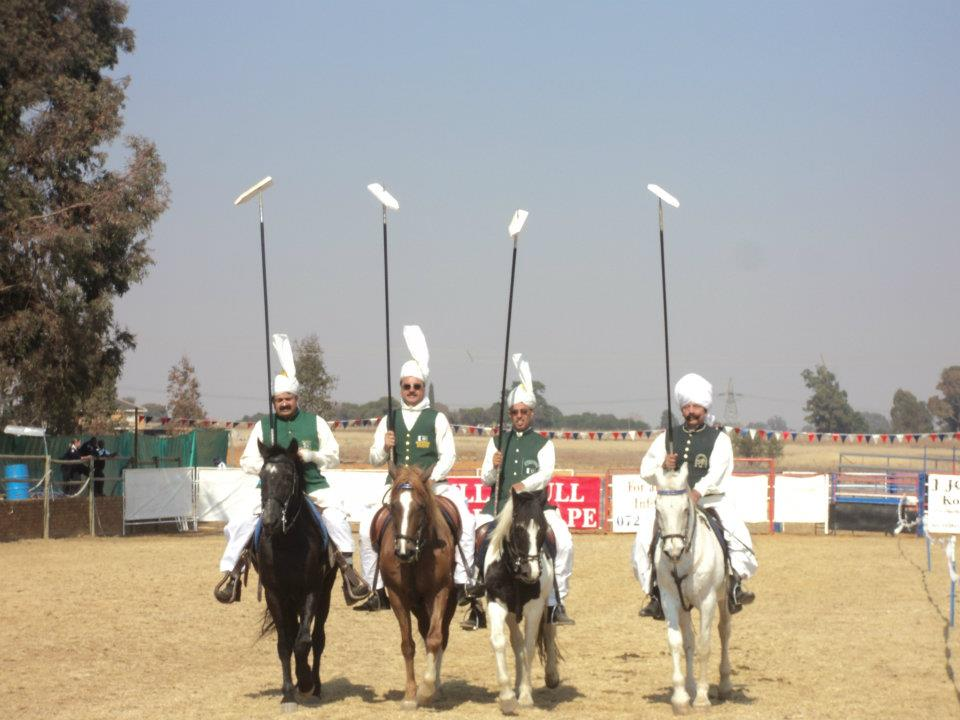
Malik Ata, Mian Javed Akhtar, Ashraf Hayat Gondal, Ch Zulfiqar Ali at the BTA Championship South Africa 2011

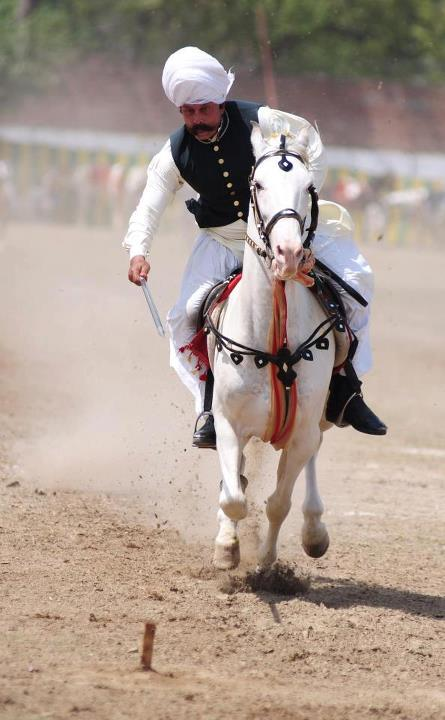
Malik Ata Muhammad Khan at Horse and Cattle Show, Ranger Ground Lahore 2012

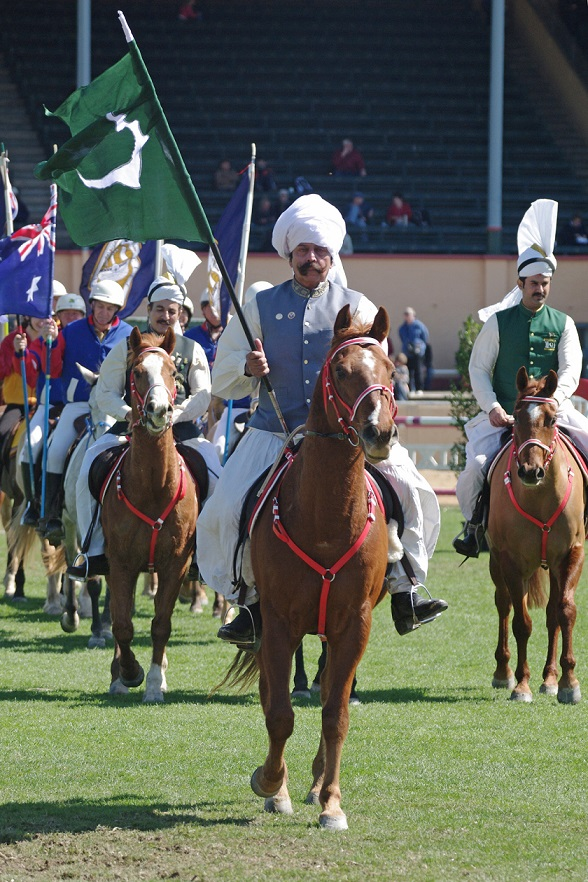
Malik Ata, Ch Zulfiqar, Qamar Zaman Khan and Wamiq Shah at Royal Adelaide Show 2010, Australia

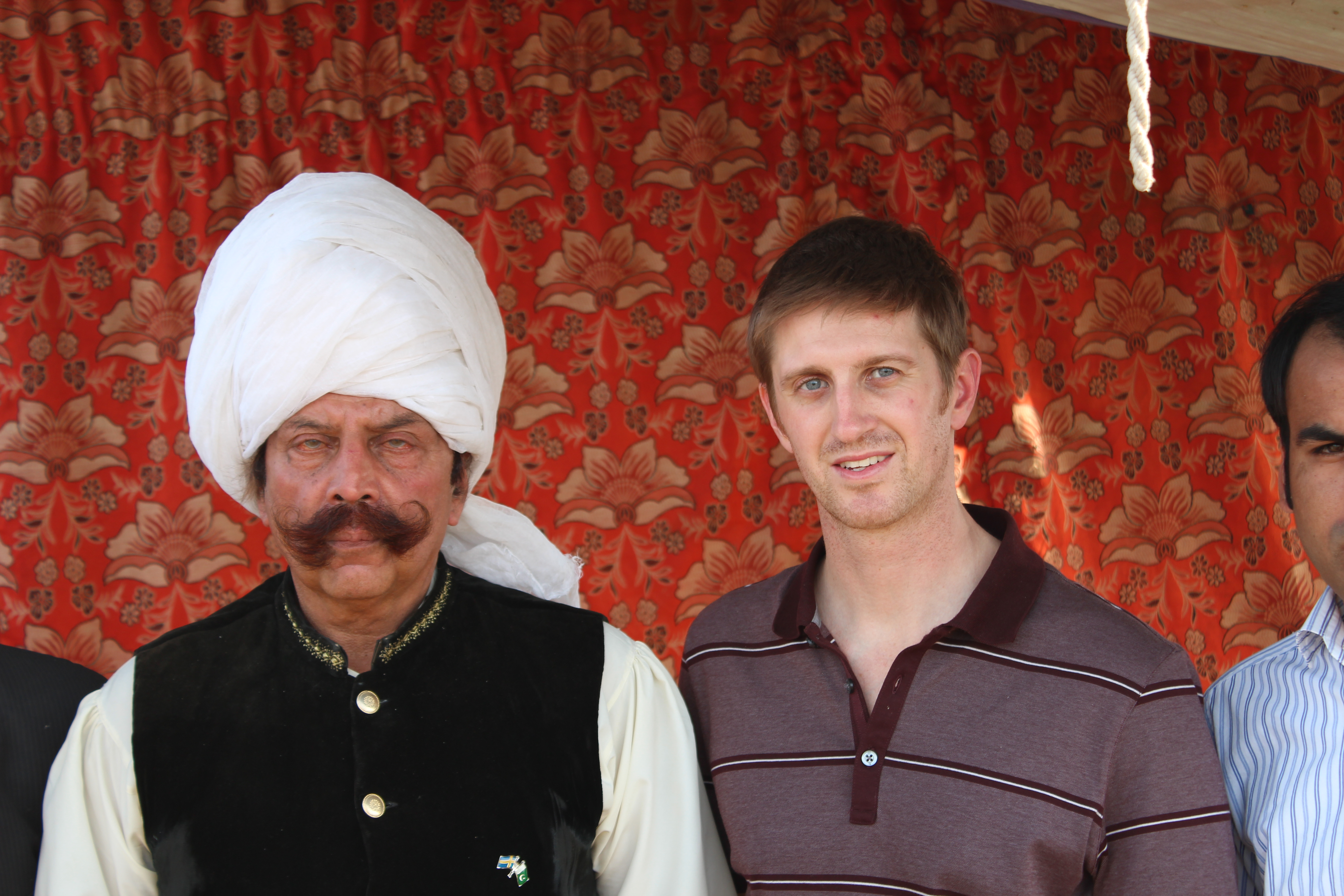
Masi Ata with Alexander Gandaa, Senior Associate NPD

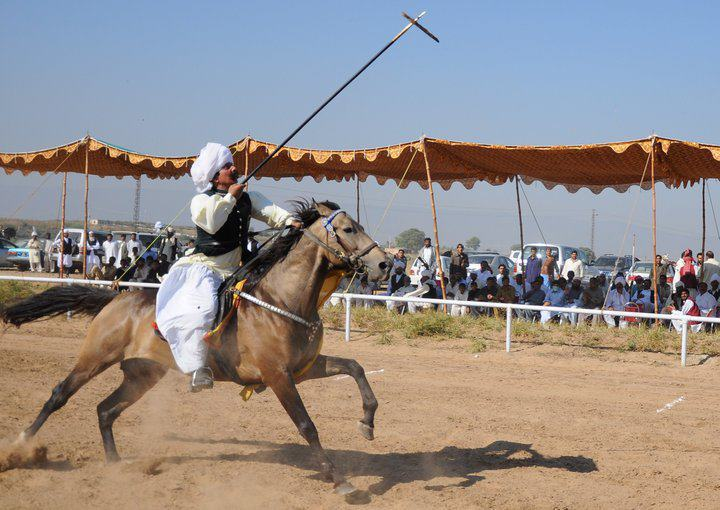
Malik Ata riding on Grey Cloud at Chakri (Rwp) Mela

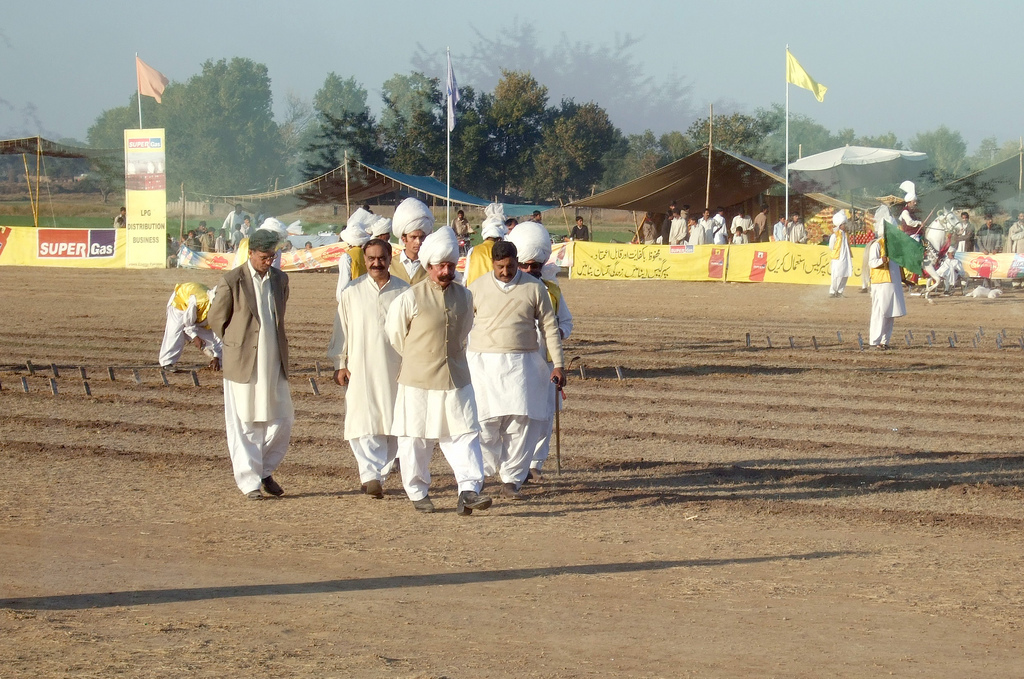
Malik Ata Muhammad Khan with his friends at Kot Fateh Khan Mela 2008

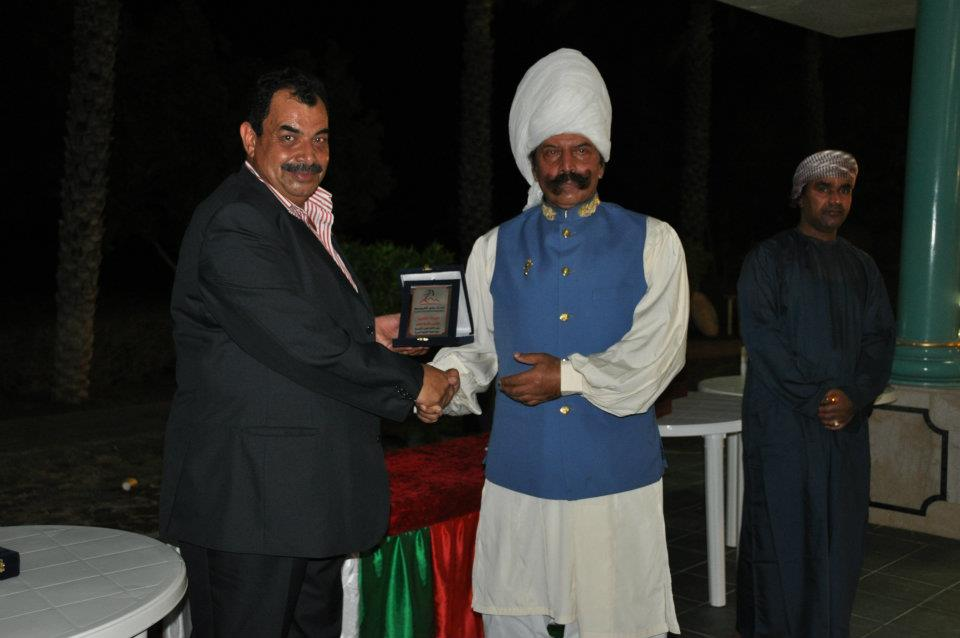
Malik Ata receiving medal from General Atif of Oman at Asian Beach Games 2010, Oman

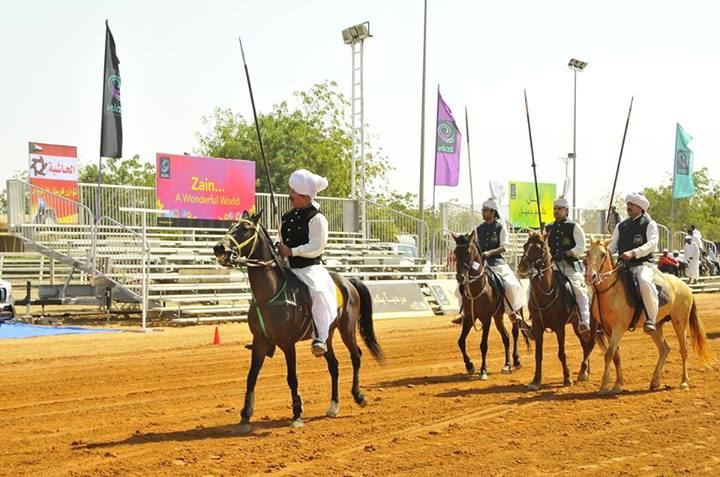
Malik Ata leading Pakistan tent pegging team at Sudan 2014

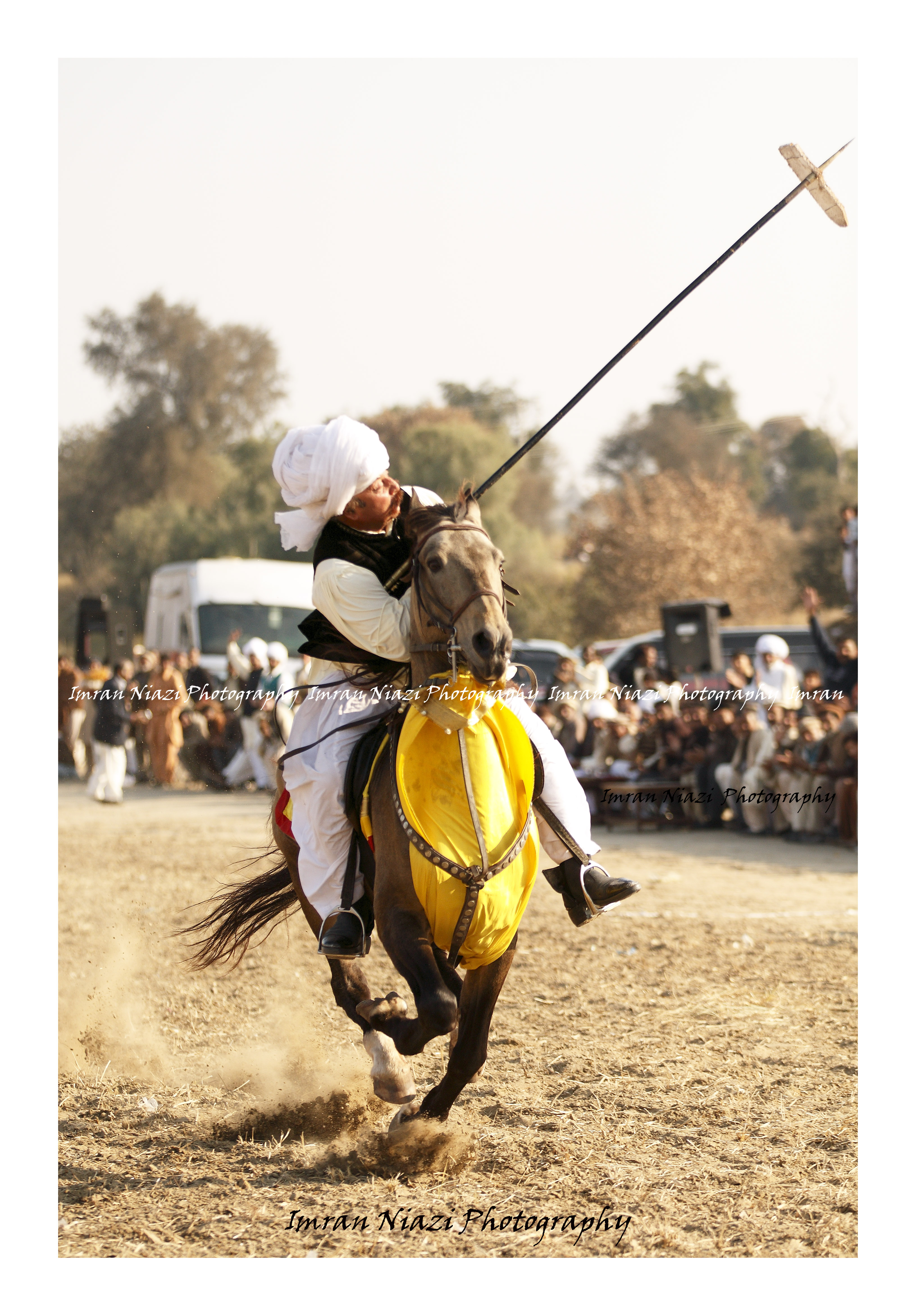
Malik Ata at Tent Pegging at Pindi Gheb, Pakistan
