= Alpha Bravo Charlie =

1998 Pakistani military drama TV series

- The opening title screen for Alpha Bravo Charlie
- Genre: Action; Thriller; Comedy drama Romance
- Created by: ISPR; Shoaib Mansoor
- Starring: Faraz Inam; Capt. Abdullah Mehmood; Capt. Qasim Khan; Shahnaz Khawaja
- Narrated by: Zia-ur Rehman (subtitles)
- Country of origin: Pakistan
- Original languages: Urdu; English; Pashto
- No. of episodes: 14

Production
- Running time: approx 40 min.

Original release
- Release: May 1998 – July 1998

Related
- Sunehray Din; Ehd-e-Wafa

Alpha Bravo Charlie (Urdu: الفا براوو چارلی) is an action and thriller Pakistani drama, produced by ISPR and directed by Pakistani drama and film director Shoaib Mansoor.

It is a sequel to the 1991 TV series Sunehray Din (Golden Days) with a somewhat different cast. The series ran on PTV from May till July 1998. The last shooting was completed at Pakistan Military Academy, Kakul, on 4 December 1997. The drama was produced by PTV Lahore center and Shoman Productions.

The events in the drama involve romance and comedy, while reflecting the Pakistan Army's operational involvement in the Siachen conflict against India and as the UN peacekeeping force in the Bosnian War.

== Story ==
The drama is centered on the lives of three characters: Faraz, Kashif, and Gulsher. It begins with the three friends graduating from the Pakistan Military Academy (PMA) and entering the army as officers. Faraz arrives first, driving a brand-new Mercedes gifted to him by his wealthy landlord father for achieving the Sword of Honour. He faces ridicule for this and is even fooled by the batman, who happens to be the Major. The next day, Kashif joins and similarly gets fooled, though he is already aware of the dynamics, as his father is a general in the army. A couple of days later, Gulsher joins as well, and gradually, the three settle into army life.

In the second episode, after Gulsher takes the adjutant's seat, he receives two calls from the same girl, who claims she has dialed the wrong number while attempting to reach someone else. Gulsher tries to flirt with her, saying, "If you want to talk to me, just be honest." The girl is not impressed and reveals that she is the daughter of a general in the army, warning him that he will have to face consequences. Gulsher becomes frightened upon learning that the general wishes to meet him at 8 p.m. in the park. He waits there for four hours but ultimately returns without meeting the general, and this pattern continues for six days.

Meanwhile, during the first few holidays, Faraz goes for a jog in a park and spots a girl. He stops jogging and turns around. She tells him she noticed what he did, and Faraz is taken aback by her boldness. He finds her impressive and starts to like her. The girl introduces herself as Shahnaz. A few days later, Faraz and Kashif are sent to Mona Depot for a horse riding course. At a nearby mansion, Faraz sees the same girl again, and Kashif is seen talking to the man accompanying her (her uncle). Faraz asks Kashif how he knows them, to which Kashif replies they are family friends.

Back at the camp, Shahnaz calls for Gulsher once more, but he insists on seeing her to apologize. When they meet, it is revealed that the girl Gulsher had been speaking with on the phone is the same Shahnaz Faraz has fallen for. Shahnaz takes Gulsher to a restaurant, realizing he is a decent guy who didn't intend to flirt with her. However, Gulsher can't afford the meal and fears losing his pride if he allows a girl to pay for him, so he flees the restaurant. The following morning, Shahnaz calls Gulsher again, but he is too afraid to speak with her and asks the adjutant to make an excuse on his behalf. That same night, Gulsher receives a letter instructing him to be at a specific location at a certain time. When he arrives, a furious Shahnaz confronts him, upset that he made an excuse and concerned about what the adjutant might think of her. She urges Gulsher to be more confident and not to shy away. After a few days, Faraz, Kashif, and Gulsher are sent to a different exercise. Before leaving, Faraz instructs his father to visit Shahnaz's house and propose marriage. During the exercise, Kashif plays around with the tank and is subsequently punished. Ultimately, he tells the Major that he wants to leave the army, believing he does not belong there and was compelled to join. However, the Major has other plans. Upon returning from the exercise, Faraz learns from his father that Shahnaz has rejected his proposal. When confronting Shahnaz, she explains that she refused him because he embodies "Mr. Perfect." She feels that he will accomplish whatever he desires, leaving little room for her impact in his life. Instead, she seeks someone with flaws whom she can help improve. Jokingly, Faraz suggests someone for her, referring to Gulsher as "our Mr. Charlie." Although he intended it as a joke, Shahnaz views it as a good idea and insists that he speak to Gulsher. Eventually, Gulsher and Shahnaz marry and begin their new life together.

While Kashif is sent to Siachin, he desperately tries to prevent this deployment. He takes the wives of high-ranking officers on shopping trips and implores his father, a general, for assistance. He cries, “I cannot survive in any way. The enemy will kill me, or I will die from the cold.” However, his efforts are in vain, and he ultimately goes to Siachin. Shortly after, Gulsher is dispatched to Bosnia. Both Kashif and Gulsher face numerous adventures during their deployments. When the situation becomes tense in Siachin, the officers devise a plan to reach the peak in order to gain control over the area at high altitude and stay ahead of the enemy. Kashif comes up with an outstanding plan and also volunteers for the mission. He and one other man are sent to the peak, but they still have to climb. While ascending the mountain, Kashif's partner is shot. Although he doesn't die, he is significantly weakened. Kashif returns fire at the enemies, and they both continue moving forward to reach the summit. Kashif's partner reaches the top first and is almost unconscious by the time Kashif arrives. Kashif wants to help him, but time is running short, so his partner urges him to proceed and to leave him behind.

Kashif moves on, but soon encounters a group of enemies. He manages to shoot them all and then returns to check on his partner. He also tries to contact headquarters, but to no avail. The next scene takes place in a hospital, where Kashif's parents are informed that their son has survived, which is considered a miracle, but he has suffered severe frostbite and both his arms and legs had to be amputated. In the same scene, news breaks about Gulsher and Shahnaz's son being born; they name him Sher Jaan.

Meanwhile, in Bosnia, a significant conflict erupts. Gulsher goes out with tanks and a few other men. He moves away from the tanks and finds himself surrounded by Serbs. When the tanks explode, the army is notified that Gulsher has been martyred. Shahnaz receives the same news. In reality, however, Gulsher is captured by Serbs who want him to spread falsehoods to provide them with proof against the Muslims. Gulsher refuses to comply.

In Pakistan, Shahnaz gradually begins to overcome Gulsher's death as her son grows up. Kashif receives artificial limbs and continues to serve in the army, eventually being promoted from Captain to Major. Faraz and Shahnaz grow closer and open a hostel for special children. Faraz's father encourages him to marry Shahnaz, and even Shahnaz's uncle and aunt believe she has feelings for Faraz.

In the final episode, Shahnaz confides in Faraz, expressing her desire to marry Kashif. However, Kashif refuses. While Shahnaz attempts to convince Kashif, her uncle receives a phone call informing them that Gulsher is alive, bringing joy to them all. In Bosnia, Gulsher finally escapes from the camp where he has been held captive but is chased by a few men and killed in the process.

Fast forward 20 years: Faraz is now a Brigadier and lives with his wife and two daughters. Kashif has become a Colonel and lives with his wife and two children. After the war in Bosnia, Shahnaz travels to Bosnia in search of Gulsher, but she is unable to find him.

== Cast and characters ==
=== Main ===
- Captain Faraz Inam as Captain / Brigadier General Faraz Ahmed: A captain in the army and son of a rich landlord in Punjab. Faraz was a confident, ambitious man — Mr Perfect who was well-built, good- looking and wealthy to go along with his excellent academic record. He owned a Mercedes, a Black C180. Faraz, unlike his friends, was not assigned any of the combat action.
- Captain Abdullah Mehmood as Captain / Colonel Kashif Kirmani: A third generation army officer who initially did not like being in the army but later proved himself. Kirmani was the main character responsible for providing humor through mischief. He played the first cousin to Shahnaz.
- Colonel Qasim Khan as Captain Gulsher Khan: Mild-mannered, modest, and humble, he married Shahnaz Sher and settled in a luxurious apartment. A few days after his marriage, Khan was sent to Bosnia on a UN peacekeeping mission. While a commanding officer of his company, Khan harbored and launched a number of rescue operations to protect Bosnian Muslims held by the Serbian forces.
- Shahnaz Khawaja as Shahnaz Sher: A Cambridge-educated elementary school teacher of special children who had a straightforward personality with her own philosophy of life. Captain Gulsher Khan's wife, a good friend of Faraz and first cousin of Kashif.

=== Supporting characters ===
- Malik Ata Muhammad Khan as Faraz's father
- Brig. Tahir
- Waqar Ahmed
- Farhat Pasha
- Asmat Sufi
- Maj. Kamran
- Cadet Shujaat
- L Naik Samiullah
- Naveed Saifullah

== Production ==
=== Casting ===
In June 2021, over 20 years after the show ended, Hadiqa Kiani revealed in an interview that she was offered the female lead in the serial but she declined due to other commitments.

== See also ==
- ISPR Media Productions
