= Hasan Zafar Arif =

Pakistani philosopher and academic

- حسن ظفر عارف
- Born: c. 1945
- Died: January 14, 2018 (aged 72–73); Karachi, Pakistan
- Education: University of Reading (PhD), Harvard University (Post-Doctoral)
- Occupations: Philosopher, Academic, Political activist
- Known for: Deputy Convener of MQM
- Political party: MQM

Hasan Zafar Arif (c. 1945 – 14 January 2018) was a Pakistani philosopher, academic, and political activist. He was a senior leader of the Muttahida Qaumi Movement – London (MQM-L) and formerly a professor of philosophy at the University of Karachi. Arif is noted for his contributions to academic thought and his involvement in the political rights movement of urban Sindh.

== Early life and education ==
Arif completed his Ph.D. in philosophy from the University of Reading in the United Kingdom and conducted postdoctoral research at Harvard University. He was later appointed as a faculty member at the University of Karachi, where he taught philosophy and engaged in political commentary.

== Political activism ==
Arif was initially associated with left-wing politics and supported the Communist Party of Pakistan. In October 2016, he formally joined MQM-London, a faction of the Muttahida Qaumi Movement led by Altaf Hussain from exile in the United Kingdom.

He was arrested on 22 October 2016 near the Karachi Press Club while attempting to address the media in defence of MQM. His arrest was reported by several media outlets and drew responses from human rights organizations.

== Death ==
Arif's body was discovered on 14 January 2018 in the backseat of his car in Karachi's Ilyas Goth area near Rehri Goth. Initial reports indicated no visible signs of torture or bullet wounds. His body was transferred to Jinnah Postgraduate Medical Centre for a post-mortem examination.

The final chemical examination report confirmed that he died of natural causes, namely a heart attack. His daughter also stated publicly that he had long-standing heart issues.

== Legacy ==
Arif remains a noted figure in academic and political circles in Pakistan. His ideological shift from leftist academia to urban political activism reflected a broader concern for justice and civil rights in Karachi and beyond. Supporters and colleagues have described him as a principled and resilient figure.
