= International Tent Pegging Federation =

International sports governing body

- Sport: Tent pegging Sports
- Jurisdiction: International
- Membership: 39 countries
- Abbreviation: ITPF
- Founded: 27 September 2013 (12 years ago)
- Headquarters: Muscat, Oman
- President: Mohamed Issa Alfairuz

Official website
- itpf.net

The International Tent Pegging Federation (ITPF, Arabic: الاتحاد الدولی لإلتقاط الأوتاد), formerly known as the World Tent Pegging Federation is the international governing body of the Equestrian discipline of tent pegging. The ITPF is responsible for the organisation of tent pegging's major international tournaments, notably the World Cup which commenced in 2014, and other international events.

ITPF headquarters is at Muscat, Oman.

== History ==
ITPF was founded as the World Tent Pegging Federation on 21 March 2013 at the World Tent Pegging Championship held in Gurgaon (Haryana), India by the representatives from India, England, Australia, Pakistan, Oman, Iraq, USA, Canada, Egypt, Sudan, Germany, Sweden, Sri Lanka, Qatar, Kazakasthan, Jordan and Lebanon.

India through its National Federation, The Equestrian Federation of India (EFI) represented by Col. (Retd) Sarpartap Singh and major World Tent Pegging Promoter Mr. Ahmad Afsar, in consultation with Malik Ata Muhammad Khan of Pakistan, pushed a meeting for all representatives of 17 countries that were participating in the World Equestrian Tent Pegging Championship in India.

This meeting marked the beginning of Unification of Tent Pegging playing countries of the world. India through its major organiser, Equiwings Sports had sustained and conducted International and Asian Equestrian Tent Pegging Championships in 2010, 2012 prior to the World event in 2013. Mr. Ahmad Afsar's first lecture for formation of Equestrian Tent Pegging Federation was recognition of the Thrilling Sport of Tent Pegging as an Olympic discipline from International Equestrian Federation (FEI) and International Olympic Committee (IOC)

Following the meeting, in Oman on 27 October 2013 on request of the head of FEI Group 7 countries the organisation changed its name to the “International Tent Pegging Federation”.

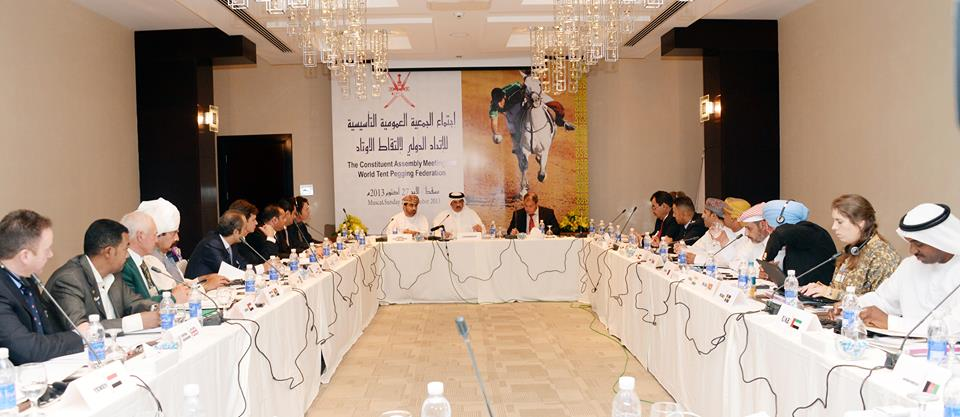
ITPF Constituent Assembly meeting on Oct 27, 2013. Oman

== Members ==
At its founding, the ITPF had 29 member countries: Afghanistan, Australia, Bahrain, Canada, Denmark, Egypt, Germany, India, Iran, Iraq, Jordan, Kazakhstan, Lebanon, Namibia, Netherlands, Norway, Oman, Pakistan, Qatar, Russia, South Africa, Sri Lanka, Sudan, Sweden, United Arab Emirates, UK, USA, and Yemen.

== Executive committee ==
The executive committee was elected on 27 October 2013 and stand for 4 years.

- President: Mohammed Issa Al Fairuz (Oman)
- Vice President:Yousef Alhoti (Oman)
- General Secretary: Hitham Allawati (Oman)
- Asst General Secretary :Salim Albulushi(Oman)

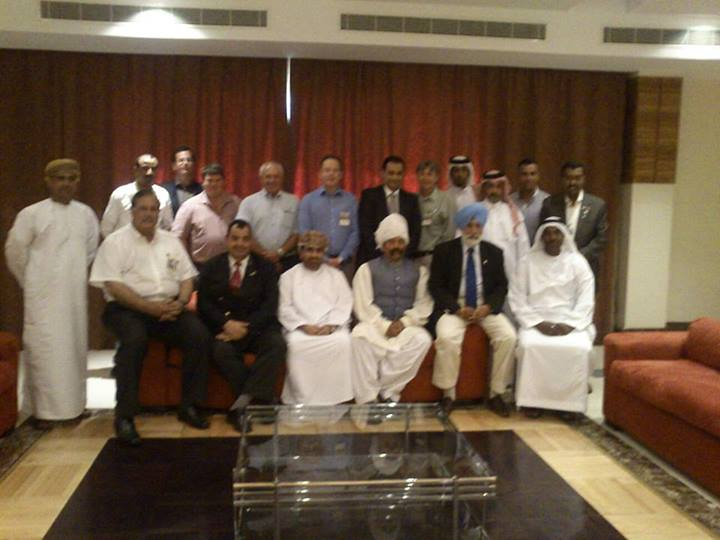
Officials of ITPF, group photo after meeting on Oct 27, 2013. Oman

- Col Sarpartap Singh (India)
- Pat Vorster (South Africa)
- Talib Dhahir Al Muhairi (UAE)
- Khalid Safer Al Hajri (Qatar)
- Eng Hisham Hattab (Egypt)
- Neville Rathbone (Australia)
- Haider H Al Jumaili (Iraq)
- Paul Brown BEM (UK)
- Akaash Maharaj (Canada)
- Rafat Abdel Rahman Bella (Sudan)
- Wasif Syed (USA)

== Events ==
=== World Cup ===
The ITPF World Cup takes place throughout the world with qualifying members leading to a final event. After the formation of the federation, the world body decided to launch its own World Cup competition. The first and the inaugural Tent Pegging World Cup was organised by the Oman Equestrian Federation (OEF) at Al Rahba Farm, Barka, Oman from March 31 to April 4, 2014. The participant countries were Pakistan, Oman, Qatar, Yemen, Iraq, Egypt, South Africa, Britain and Australia who qualified the Sudan and Pakistan qualifying events in January and February respectively. The winner was South Africa and the runner-up was Oman.

The second ITPF World Cup was held from 21 August - 23 August 2023 in George, Western Cape, South Africa. The participant countries were South Africa, Sudan, India, Egypt, Saudi Arabia, Pakistan, Jordan, Oman and Yemen. The winner was Saudi Arabia and the runner-up was Pakistan.

== World Cup history ==
Year	Host Nation(s)	Final Venue	Final		
Year	Host Nation(s)	Final Venue	Winner	Result	Runner-up
2014; Details	Oman	Al Rahba Farm, Muscat, Oman, Oman	South Africa; 758.5 points	South Africa won by 65 runs	Oman; 693.5 points
2023; Details	South Africa	George,Cape Town, South Africa; South Africa	Saudi Arabia; 581.5 points	Saudi Arabia won by 11.5 runs	Pakistan; 570 points

The World Cup began in 2014

== Representation in the FEI World Equestrian Games 2014 ==
2014 FEI World Equestrian Games were held at Normandy, France from 23 August from 7 September by the FEI. The FEI had invited the Vice President of International Tent Pegging Federation Malik Ata Muhammad Khan with full tent pegging team to give a demonstration of tent pegging to all the equestrian players who came there from all over the world. Malik Ata taught them the basics of tent pegging, rules, methods how tent pegging is done. Haroon Bandial, Namdar Rehmat, Syed Wamiq Shah and Raja Zarrar Sajjad were part of the team.

== Photo gallery ==
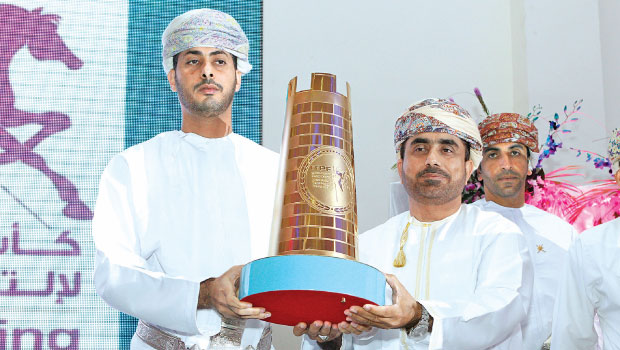
Saad bin Mohammed Al Mardhouf Al Saadi, minister of sports Oman unveils the trophy of the 2014 Tent Pegging World Cup along with Mohammed bin Issa Al Fairuz, the president of ITPF

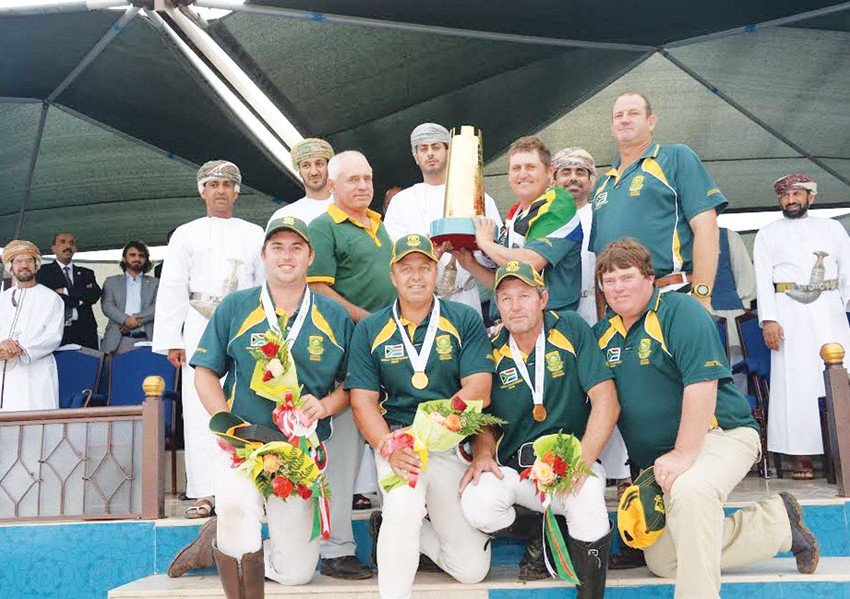
South African team with World cup 2014 trophy

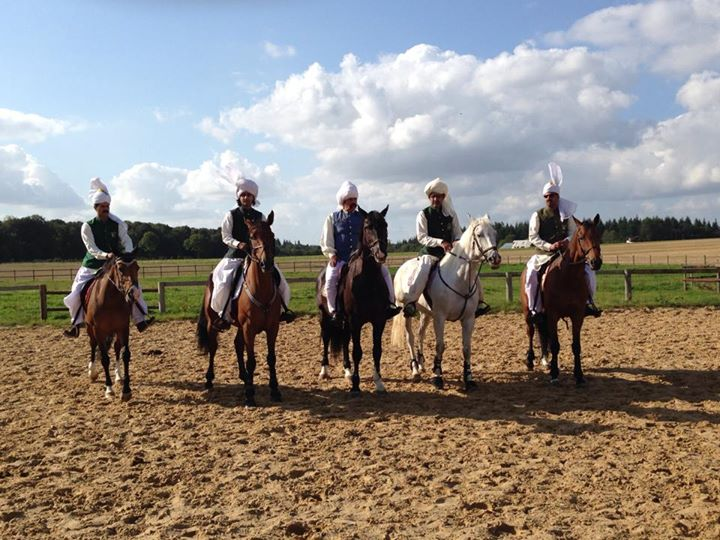
ITPF Vice President Malik Ata with Pakistan team at world equestrian games France 2014

== See also ==
- Tent pegging at the 2010 Asian Beach Games
