= Bani =

Bani may refer to:

== Places ==
=== Burkina Faso ===
- Bani Department, a department in Séno Province
  - Bani, Bani, capital of the department
- Bani, Bourzanga, Bam Province, a village
- Bani, Gnagna, Gnagna Province, a village

=== India ===
- Bani, India, Jammu and Kashmir, a village and an assembly constituency
- Bani, Chhatoh, a village in Uttar Pradesh
- Bani, Rahi, a village in Uttar Pradesh

=== Iran ===
- Bani, Iran, a village in West Azerbaijan Province
- Boniabad, South Khorasan, also known as Banī, a village in South Khorasan Province

=== Elsewhere ===
- Bani, Central African Republic, a village in Haute-Kotto Prefecture
- Baní, a city in the Dominican Republic of historical importance
- Bani, Gambia, a town
- Bani Ammar, a village in Egypt
- Bani River, a tributary of the Niger River in Mali
- Bani, Mirpur, a village in Pakistan
- Bani, Pangasinan, a municipality in the Philippines

== People ==
- Bani (given name)
- Bani (surname)
- Askia Muhammad Bani (died 1588), ruler of the Songhai Empire from 1586 to 1588
- Bani Kumar, Indian radio broadcaster, playwright, composer, radio script writer Baidyonath Bhattacharya (1907–1978)
- Bani J, Indian fitness model, actress and former MTV India presenter Gurbani Judge (born 1987)

== Arts and entertainment ==
- Bani – Ishq Da Kalma (English: Bani – A Holy Script of Love), an Indian television series and the name of the main character
- Bani, a main character in Kasamh Se, an Indian soap opera
- Bani, a stylistic school of the Indian classical music genre dhrupad
- Bani, short for Gurbani, traditional prayer in Sikism.

== Currency ==
- Bani, 1/100 of a Moldovan leu
- Bani, 1/100 of a Romanian leu

== Other uses ==
- Banu (Arabic), Beni, Bene or Banī, Arabic for "the sons of" or "children of" which appears before the name of a tribal progenitor
- Bani (letter), a letter of the Georgian alphabet
- Bani the Gadite, one of David's Mighty Warriors in the Bible
- Tripura Bani, an Indian Bengali-language weekly newspaper of the All India Forward Bloc party in the state of Tripura
- BANI, acronym for Brittle, Anxious, Nonlinear, Incomprehensible. It appeared after VUCA (Volatile, Uncertain, Complex, Ambiguous).

== See also ==
- Al-Bani, a village in northern Syria
- Bani Bid, a village in Kermanshah Province, Iran
- Bani Chams, a group of the Cham people who practice Islam
- Bene (disambiguation)
- Beni (disambiguation)
- Banny (disambiguation)
