= Benni =

Benni is a given name and a surname. Notable people with the name include:

== Surname ==
- Antonio Stefano Benni (1880–1945), Italian fascist politician
- Arthur Benni (1839–1867), Polish-born English journalist and activist
- Ignatius Behnam II Benni (1831–1897), Patriarch of the Syriac Catholic Church
- Stefano Benni (1947–2025), Italian writer, poet and journalist

== Given name ==
- Benni Bødker (born 1975), Danish writer
- Benni Efrat (born 1936), Israeli artist
- Benni Jensen (1965–2025), birth name of Julian LeFay, Danish programmer and video game designer
- Benni Korzen (born 1938), Danish film producer
- Benni Ljungbeck (born 1958), Swedish wrestler
- Benni McCarthy (Benedict McCarthy, born 1977), South African footballer
- Benni Miller (Bennie Miller, born 1984), American drag queen known as Ra'Jah O'Hara

== See also ==
- Trapania benni, a species of sea slug
- Beni (disambiguation)
- Bennie (surname)
- Bennis, a surname
- Benny (disambiguation)
  - Benny (surname)
