= Bene =

Bene may refer to:

== Places ==
- Bene (Crete), a town of ancient Crete, Greece
- Bēne Parish, parish of Latvia
- Bênê, Afrin, village in Aleppo Governorate, Syria
- Bene, a rural municipality in Zakarpattia Oblast, Ukraine

== People ==
=== Mononym ===
- Benê, Brazilian footballer (1935–2001)
- Bené (association footballer), Brazilian footballer (born 1941)
- Benê (footballer, born 1935), Brazilian football midfielder
- Benê (footballer, born 1944), Brazilian football midfielder
- Benê (footballer, born 1971), Brazilian football forward
- Benee (formerly known as Bene), New Zealand singer

=== Given name ===
- Bené Arnold (1935–2024), American ballerina and professor of ballet
- Bene Barbosa, Brazilian lawyer
- Bené Benwikere (born 1991), American football cornerback

=== Surname ===
- Adriana Ferrarese del Bene (1759 – after 1803), Italian opera singer
- Barnabás Bene (born 1986), Hungarian middle-distance and long-distance runner
- Carmelo Bene (1937–2002), Italian actor, poet, film director and screenwriter
- Ferenc Bene (1944–2006), Hungarian footballer
  - Ferenc Bene jr. (born 1978), Hungarian football manager and former football forward; son of Ferenc Bene
- Gusztáv Bene (1911–1993), Hungarian boxer
- Ildikó Bene, Hungarian politician
- Jean Bène, French politician
- László Bene (1924–1977), Hungarian boxer
- Márton Bene (born 1986), Hungarian alpine skier
- Matej Bene (born 1992), Slovak ice hockey player
- Maurice Béné, French politician
- Mihaela Bene (born 1973), Romanian sprint canoeist

== Other uses ==
- Bene AG, a European office furniture product and services company
- BeNe League, binational football league spanning Belgium and the Netherlands
- Bene Israel ("Sons of Israel") are a historic community of Jews in India
- a prefix denoting a society in the fictional world of Dune, among them:
  - Bene Gesserit
  - Bene Tleilax

== See also ==
- Behne, a surname
- Beni (disambiguation)
- Bani (disambiguation)
