= Bennis =

Bennis is a surname. Notable people with the surname include:

- Ahmed Bennis (1914–2009), Moroccan chess master
- Edward Bennis (1885–1936), the head football coach for the Villanova University Wildcats football team in 1916
- Elizabeth Bennis (1725–1802), an Irish Methodist activist and diarist
- George Geary Bennis (1790–1866), writer and librarian
- Mohammed Bennis, Moroccan poet and one of the most important poets of Modern Arabic Poetry
- Phil Bennis (born 1942), retired Irish hurling manager and former player
- Phyllis Bennis (born 1951), American writer and activist
- Richie Bennis (born 1945), retired Irish hurling manager and former player
- Susan Bennis, shoe designer and co-founder of the Susan Dennis/Warren Edwards brand
- Warren Bennis (1925–2014), American scholar, organizational consultant and author, and pioneer of Leadership studies

== See also ==
- Benni, a given name and surname
- Bennis v. Michigan, 516 U.S. 442 (1996), decision by the United States Supreme Court, which held that innocent owner defense is not constitutionally mandated by Fourteenth Amendment Due Process in cases of civil forfeiture
- Benis, a village in Iran also written as "Bennis"
