= Muzhichye =

Muzhichye Мужичье
- Selo
- Location within Voronezh Oblast Location within Russia
- Coordinates: 50°43′N 41°03′E
- Country: Russia
- Region: Voronezh Oblast
- District: Vorobyovsky District
- Time zone: UTC+3:00

Muzhichye (Russian: Мужичье) is a rural locality (a selo) in Beryozovskoye Rural Settlement, Vorobyovsky District, Voronezh Oblast, Russia. The population was 909 as of 2010. There are 7 streets.

== Geography ==
Muzhichye is located 16 km northeast of Vorobyovka (the district's administrative centre) by road. Beryozovka is the nearest rural locality.
