= Benny (disambiguation) =

Benny or Bennie is a given name.

It may also refer to:

People:

- Bennie (surname)
- Benny (surname)
- Benny (footballer), Portuguese footballer Bernardo Pereira Silvano (born 1996)
- Benny (slang), a derogatory term used by residents of Jersey Shore towns for tourists that visit each summer
- Character (Benny Hawkins) in the British soap opera Crossroads

Other uses

- slang for Benzedrine, an amphetamine
- slang for Eggs Benedict, a dish
- Benny Award, the highest honour that can be bestowed to a New Zealand variety entertainer
- Benny, Ontario, Canada, an unincorporated community
- "Benny", a song by Luke Hemmings from Boy, 2024
