= Pervomaysky, Vorobyovsky District, Voronezh Oblast =

Pervomaysky Первомайский
- Settlement
- Location within Voronezh Oblast Location within Russia
- Coordinates: 50°38′N 40°51′E
- Country: Russia
- Region: Voronezh Oblast
- District: Vorobyovsky District
- Time zone: UTC+3:00

Pervomaysky (Russian: Первомайский) is a rural locality (a settlement) in Solonetskoye Rural Settlement, Vorobyovsky District, Voronezh Oblast, Russia. The population was 556 as of 2010. There are 11 streets.

== Geography ==
Pervomaysky is located 5 km west of Vorobyovka (the district's administrative centre) by road. Kvashino is the nearest rural locality.
