= Leshchanoye =

Leshchanoye Лещаное
- Selo
- Location within Voronezh Oblast Location within Russia
- Coordinates: 50°35′N 40°53′E
- Country: Russia
- Region: Voronezh Oblast
- District: Vorobyovsky District
- Time zone: UTC+3:00

Leshchanoye (Russian: Лещаное) is a rural locality (a selo) in Vorobyovskoye Rural Settlement, Vorobyovsky District, Voronezh Oblast, Russia. The population was 1,176 as of 2010. There are 13 streets.

== Geography ==
Leshchanoye is located 12 km south of Vorobyovka (the district's administrative centre) by road. Vorobyovka is the nearest rural locality.
