= Banny, Russia =

Banny (Russian: Банный; masculine), Bannaya (Банная; feminine), or Bannoye (Банное; neuter) is the name of several rural localities in Russia.

- Banny (rural locality), a khutor in Lychaksky Selsoviet of Frolovsky District in Volgograd Oblast
- Bannoye, Altai Republic, a selo in Karagayskoye Rural Settlement of Ust-Koksinsky District in the Altai Republic; 50°23′N 84°52′E
- Bannoye, Orenburg Oblast, a selo in Kolpaksky Selsoviet of Gaysky District in Orenburg Oblast
- Bannoye, Sverdlovsk Oblast, a village in Kriulinsky Selsoviet of Krasnoufimsky District in Sverdlovsk Oblast
- Bannoye, Tambov Oblast, a settlement in Troitskoroslyaysky Selsoviet of Tokaryovsky District in Tambov Oblast
- Bannoye, Tula Oblast, a village in Lobanovsky Rural Okrug of Yefremovsky District in Tula Oblast
- Bannoye, Udmurt Republic, a village in Italmasovsky Selsoviet of Zavyalovsky District in the Udmurt Republic
- Bannoye, Voronezh Oblast, a selo in Berezovskoye Rural Settlement of Vorobyovsky District in Voronezh Oblast
