= Nikolskoye 1-ye =

Nikolskoye 1-ye Никольское 1-е
- Selo
- Location within Voronezh Oblast Location within Russia
- Coordinates: 50°35′N 41°08′E
- Country: Russia
- Region: Voronezh Oblast
- District: Vorobyovsky District
- Time zone: UTC+3:00

Nikolskoye 1-ye (Russian: Никольское 1-е) is a rural locality (a selo) and the administrative center of Nikolskoye 1-ye Rural Settlement, Vorobyovsky District, Voronezh Oblast, Russia. The population was 1,197 as of 2010. There are 14 streets.

== Geography ==
Nikolskoye 1-ye is located 19 km southeast of Vorobyovka (the district's administrative centre) by road. Nikolskoye 2-ye is the nearest rural locality.
