= Nizhny Byk =

Nizhny Byk Нижний Бык
- Selo
- Location within Voronezh Oblast Location within Russia
- Coordinates: 50°41′N 41°10′E
- Country: Russia
- Region: Voronezh Oblast
- District: Vorobyovsky District
- Time zone: UTC+3:00

Nizhny Byk (Russian: Нижний Бык) is a rural locality (a selo) in Beryozovskoye Rural Settlement, Vorobyovsky District, Voronezh Oblast, Russia. The population was 271 as of 2010. There are 6 streets.

== Geography ==
Nizhny Byk is located 24 km northeast of Vorobyovka (the district's administrative centre) by road. Mirny is the nearest rural locality.
