= Krasnopolye, Voronezh Oblast =

Krasnopolye Краснополье
- Selo
- Location within Voronezh Oblast Location within Russia
- Coordinates: 50°37′N 41°17′E
- Country: Russia
- Region: Voronezh Oblast
- District: Vorobyovsky District
- Time zone: UTC+3:00

Krasnopolye (Russian: Краснополье) is a rural locality (a selo) in Nikolskoye 1-ye Rural Settlement, Vorobyovsky District, Voronezh Oblast, Russia. The population was 64 as of 2010. There are 10 streets.

== Geography ==
Krasnopolye is located 31 km east of Vorobyovka (the district's administrative centre) by road. 1-go otdeleniya sovkhoza Krasnopolsky is the nearest rural locality.
