= Bodker =

Bodker or Bødker may refer to:

- Benni Bødker (born 1975), Danish writer
- Cecil Bødker (1927–2020), Danish writer, most famous for the use of the character "Silas" in her books
- Henrik Bødker (born 1983), Danish professional football midfielder
- Mads Bødker (born 1987), Danish ice hockey defenceman
- Mike Bodker (born 1966), current mayor of Johns Creek, Georgia, US
- Mikkel Bødker (born 1989), Danish ice hockey right winger
- Ronni Lykke Bødker, chairman of Hjernerystelsesforeningen
- Susanne Bødker (born 1956), Danish computer scientist
