= Solontsy, Vorobyovsky District, Voronezh Oblast =

Solontsy Солонцы
- Selo
- Location within Voronezh Oblast Location within Russia
- Coordinates: 50°37′N 40°41′E
- Country: Russia
- Region: Voronezh Oblast
- District: Vorobyovsky District
- Time zone: UTC+3:00

Solontsy (Russian: Солонцы́) is a rural locality (a selo) and the administrative center of Solonetskoye Rural Settlement, Vorobyovsky District, Voronezh Oblast, Russia. The population was 739 as of 2010. There are 8 streets.

== Geography ==
Solontsy is located 21 km west of Vorobyovka (the district's administrative centre) by road. Kamenka is the nearest rural locality.
