= Nagolny, Voronezh Oblast =

Nagolny Нагольный
- Khutor
- Location within Voronezh Oblast Location within Russia
- Coordinates: 50°39′N 41°22′E
- Country: Russia
- Region: Voronezh Oblast
- District: Vorobyovsky District
- Time zone: UTC+3:00

Nagolny (Russian: Нагольный) is a rural locality (a khutor) in Nikolskoye 1-ye Rural Settlement, Vorobyovsky District, Voronezh Oblast, Russia. The population was 134 as of 2010. There are 2 streets.

== Geography ==
Nagolny is located 41 km east of Vorobyovka (the district's administrative centre) by road. Iskra is the nearest rural locality.
