= Beryozovka, Vorobyovsky District, Voronezh Oblast =

Beryozovka Березовка
- Selo
- Location within Voronezh Oblast Location within Russia
- Coordinates: 50°42′N 40°58′E
- Country: Russia
- Region: Voronezh Oblast
- District: Vorobyovsky District
- Time zone: UTC+3:00

Beryozovka (Russian: Березовка) is a rural locality (a selo) and the administrative center of Beryozovskoye Rural Settlement, Vorobyovsky District, Voronezh Oblast, Russia. The population was 376 as of 2010. There are 16 streets.

== Geography ==
Beryozovka is located 9 km northeast of Vorobyovka (the district's administrative centre) by road. Muzhichye is the nearest rural locality.
