= Verkhnetolucheyevo =

Verkhnetolucheyevo Верхнетолучеево
- Selo
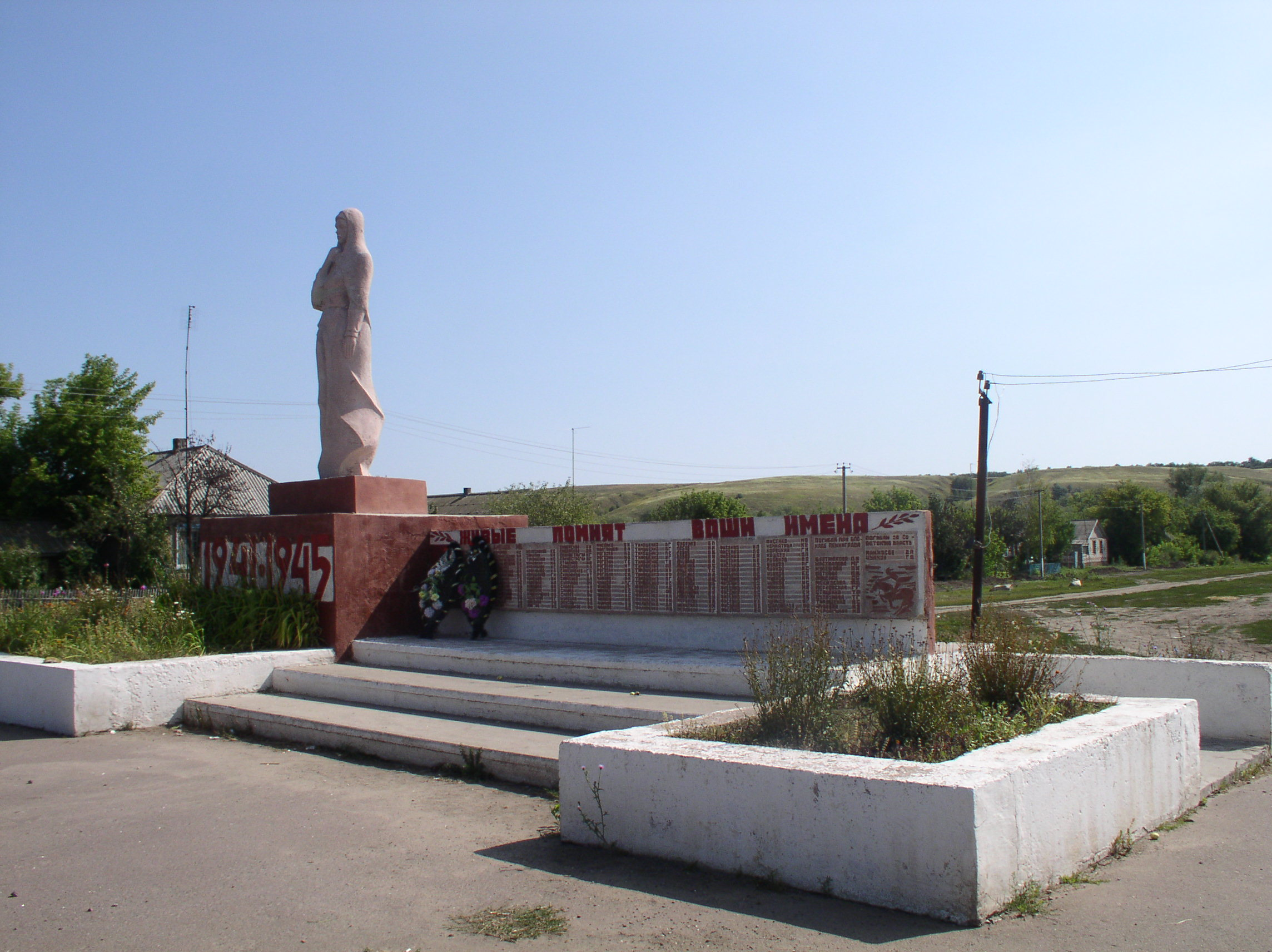
- A monument to the fallen in World War II

- Location within Voronezh Oblast Location within Russia
- Coordinates: 50°45′N 41°02′E
- Country: Russia
- Region: Voronezh Oblast
- District: Vorobyovsky District
- Time zone: UTC+3:00

Verkhnetolucheyevo (Russian: Верхнетолучеево) is a rural locality (a selo) in Beryozovskoye Rural Settlement, Vorobyovsky District, Voronezh Oblast, Russia. The population was 270 as of 2010. There are 3 streets.

== Geography ==
Verkhnetolucheyevo is located 18 km northeast of Vorobyovka (the district's administrative centre) by road. Muzhichye is the nearest rural locality.
