= Verkhny Byk =

Verkhny Byk Верхний Бык
- Selo
- Location within Voronezh Oblast Location within Russia
- Coordinates: 50°43′N 41°15′E
- Country: Russia
- Region: Voronezh Oblast
- District: Vorobyovsky District
- Time zone: UTC+3:00

Verkhny Byk (Russian: Верхний Бык) is a rural locality (a selo) in Beryozovskoye Rural Settlement, Vorobyovsky District, Voronezh Oblast, Russia. The population was 548 as of 2010. There are 8 streets.

== Geography ==
Verkhny Byk is located 30 km northeast of Vorobyovka (the district's administrative centre) by road. Muzhichye is the nearest rural locality.
