= Beni =

Beni may refer to:

== Characters ==
- Beni Gabor, a character in the 1999 film The Mummy
- Benimaru Nikaido, fan nickname of a character in The King of Fighters

== People ==
=== Given name ===
- Beni (Australian musician), Australian musician and disc jockey
- Beni (singer) (born 1986), Japanese singer, formerly known by the name Beni Arashiro
- Beni Badibanga (born 1996), Belgian footballer
- Beni Bertrand Binobagira, Burundian swimmer
- Beni Hofer (born 1978), Swiss freestyle skier
- Beni Kiendé (born 1986), Gabonese footballer
- Beni Lar (born 1967), Nigerian politician
- Beni Montresor (1926–2001), Italian artist, opera and film director, set designer, author and illustrator
- Beni Obermüller (1930–2005), German alpine skier
- Beni Takemata (born 1998), Japanese shogi player
- Beni Mukendi (born 2002), Angolan footballer

=== Surname ===
- Alfred Beni (1923–1995), Austrian chess master
- Alphonse Beni (1946–2023), Cameroonian actor and film director
- Bhagat Beni (fl. c. 15th–16th century), saint of Sikhism
- Claudia Beni (born 1986), Croatian singer
- Elisa Beni (born 1965), Spanish journalist
- Federico de Beni (born 1973), Italian cyclist
- Gerardo Beni, American physicist and electrical engineer
- Jules Beni (died 1861), American outlaw

== Places ==
=== Bolivia ===
- Beni Department
- Beni River
  - Beni savanna

=== Democratic Republic of the Congo ===
- Beni, Democratic Republic of the Congo, a city in North Kivu province
  - Beni (commune), a commune (municipality) of the city
- Beni Territory an administrative division of North Kivu province

=== Egypt ===
- Beni Suef
- Beni Mazar
- Beni Hasan an Ancient Egyptian cemetery site

=== Morocco ===
- Beni Mellal
- Beni ʿAmir

=== Elsewhere ===
- Beni, Nepal (disambiguation)

== Other uses ==
- Beni (album), the debut album of J-pop singer Beni
- Beni (music), a Tanzanian/Tanganyikan musical style
- Beni (Thracian tribe), a historical tribe in Eastern and Southeastern Europe
- Beni Ḥassān, a historical Bedouin tribe
- Beni (紅), Japanese for the color carthamin or safflower red
- Beni or Béni, a transliteration of Banu, an Arabic tribal progenitor meaning "the sons of" or "children of"

== See also ==
- Bani (disambiguation)
- Bene (disambiguation)
- Benni, a given name and surname
