= Bannoye, Voronezh Oblast =

Bannoye Банное
- Selo
- Location within Voronezh Oblast Location within Russia
- Coordinates: 50°48′N 41°11′E
- Country: Russia
- Region: Voronezh Oblast
- District: Vorobyovsky District
- Time zone: UTC+3:00

Bannoye (Russian: Банное) is a rural locality (a selo) in Beryozovskoye Rural Settlement, Vorobyovsky District, Voronezh Oblast, Russia. The population was 376 as of 2010. There are 9 streets.

== Geography ==
Bannoye is located 30 km northeast of Vorobyovka (the district's administrative centre) by road. Muzhichye is the nearest rural locality.
