= Kenneth Bøgh Andersen =

Danish writer

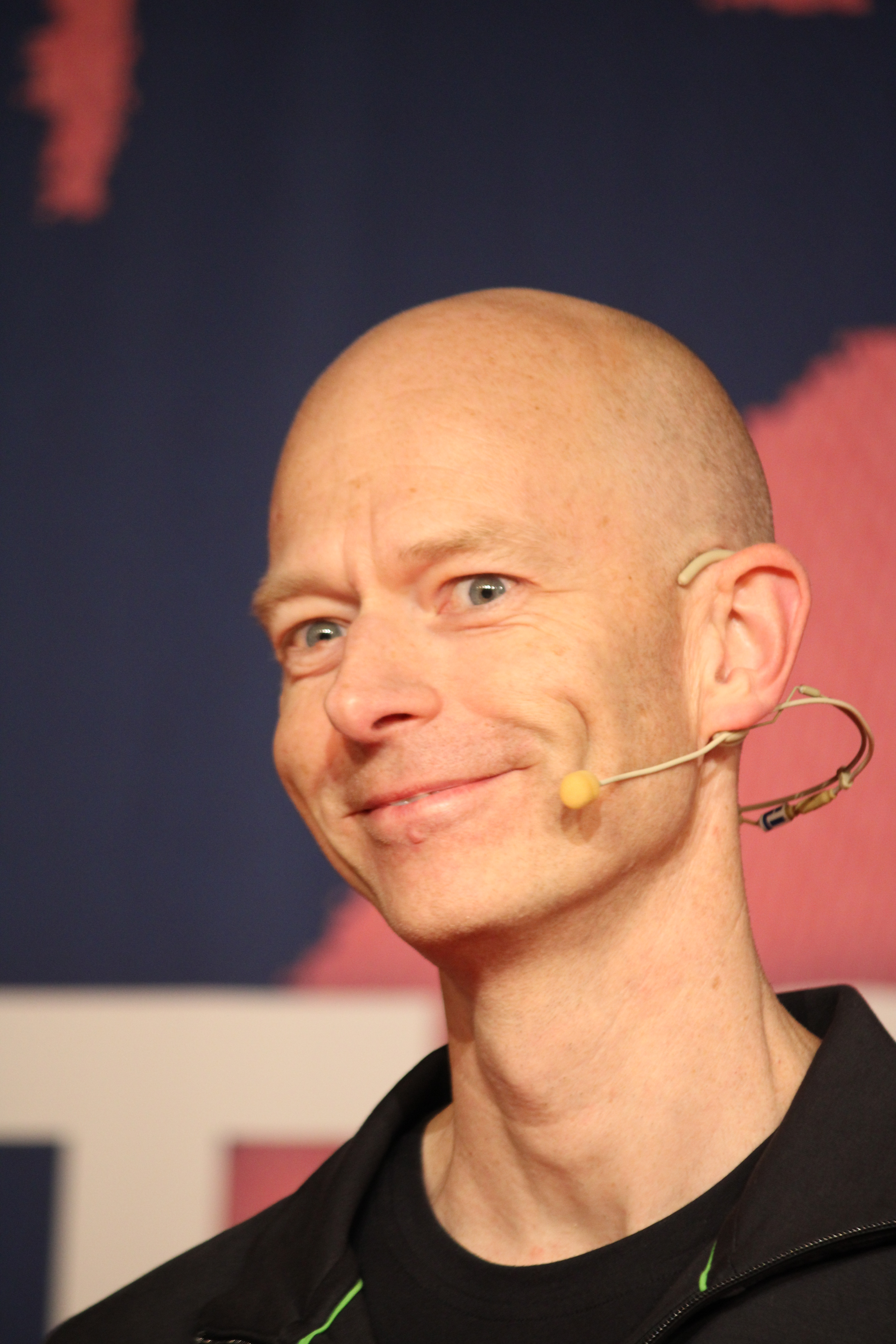
- Bøgh Andersen in 2025
- Born: 29 November 1976 (age 49); Snekkersten, Denmark
- Citizenship: Kingdom of Denmark
- Education: Haslev Gymnasium (until 1996); N. Zahles Seminarium (until 2002)
- Occupations: Author; producer; lecturer; teacher
- Spouse: Camilla Dalgaard (m. 2005)
- Children: 2
- Parents: Steen Bøgh Andersen (father); Kirsten Bøgh Andersen (mother, née Jochumsen)
- Writing career
- Pen name: Kenneth B. Andersen (when published in non-Danish languages)
- Years active: 2000–present
- Period: Contemporary
- Genres: Fantasy; science fiction; horror literature; young adult fiction
- Notable works: The Great Devil War book series; Slaget i Caïssa book series; Antboy book series
- Notable awards: The Municipal School Library Association's Author Award (2006), The Danish School Librarians' Children's Book Award (2006), The Claus Deleuran Award (2018), The Orla Award (2005, 2006, 2009), The BMF's Children's Book Award (2009), and more (full list)
- Website: kennethboeghandersen.dk

Kenneth Bøgh Andersen (/ˈændərsən/ AN-dər-sən; Danish: [ˈkɛn.ət ˈb̥øˀ ˈɑnɐsn̩]; 29 November 1976) is a Danish author best known for his The Great Devil War series of young adult fantasy novels, as well as the Antboy series of children's superhero novels and the Slaget i Caïssa series of fantasy novels directed at a younger middle grade audience. He is a prolific author who has written multiple horror short story anthologies and participated in collaborative horror anthologies with other authors, and has also written multiple reimaginings of classic horror novels and classic scary fairy tales, primarily the ones colelcted by the Brothers Grimm. Due to the lack of the letter Ø in all languages aside from Danish and Norwegian, in most foreign literature markets he has been known professionally as Kenneth B. Andersen.

== Personal life ==
Kenneth Bøgh Andersen was born to two Danish parents, Steen Bøgh Andersen and Kirsten Bøgh Andersen (née Jochumsen) on 29 November 1976 in the town of Snekkersten, Northern Zealand, Denmark. Throughout his childhood, Andersen's family moved around so that he came to grow up in Henne, Lydum, Snekkersten and Ringsted in that order. He now lives in Valby. On 2 October 2005, Andersen was married to school teacher Camilla Dalgaard (née Hanse) and they have two children. Andersen also has a dog named Milo.

In spite of Kenneth Bøgh Andersen dealing with religious faith and mythology, primarily of the Judeo-Christian form, Andersen describes himself as an atheist, but he believes that the Bible is "full of great stories" and that it contains a wealth of elements to discuss, and sees it as "very inspiring" in regards to the reality he has written in his Great Devil War series of books, and has also stated that it was always important for him that when he had to put the Bible "under loving – and sometimes the opposite – treatment, it is also important to me that I don't invent things that aren't actually there [in the text]." He has been quoted saying that for this reason, the God that he presents the books still had to be omnipotent, omnibenevolent, omniscient and so on, but that one does not have to look very deeply in the Bible before finding this notion problematic and paradoxial. Despite his atheism and certain of his treatments of biblical narratives being viewed as sacrilegious by certain fundamentalist Christian Danes, Andersen has been invited by several Christian priests to partake in sermons in various churches, and has agreed to do it on occasion.

== Career ==
=== Early career ===
Although Andersen says he has always loved to read, it was not until he was introduced to Stephen King at age 15 when his school teacher gave him a copy of The Shining that he was inspired to write books himself. He says the book "blew his mind and I was instantly hooked." According to Andersen, he was however not very good. Andersen wrote his first book, Nidhugs Slaver (English translation: The Slaves of Níðhöggr) around a year after this, while in tenth grade of folkskole. The publisher that he sent the book to rejected it. After finishing his folkeskole education, his high school education at Haslev Gymnasium and then an education at N. Zahles Seminarium, Andersen went on to become a certified teacher and worked as one until 2007 when he switched to writing full-time.

According to Andersen, it took him seven years and fifteen turned-down manuscripts before he finally got his first novel published, which was Slaget i Caïssa. Andersen debuted in 2000 with the fantasy trilogy Slaget i Caïssa (English: The Battle of Caïssa) and subsequently wrote and had published a large amount of books for children and young adults in the genres of fantasy, horror and science fiction. His books have won multiple awards and have so far been translated into Swedish, Norwegian, German, Icelandic, Spanish and English.

Andersen has also written the Antboy series of comedic superhero books aimed at younger children, which was adapted into three live action feature films, Antboy in 2013, Antboy: Revenge of the Red Fury in 2014 and Antboy 3 in 2016.

=== The Great Devil War book series ===
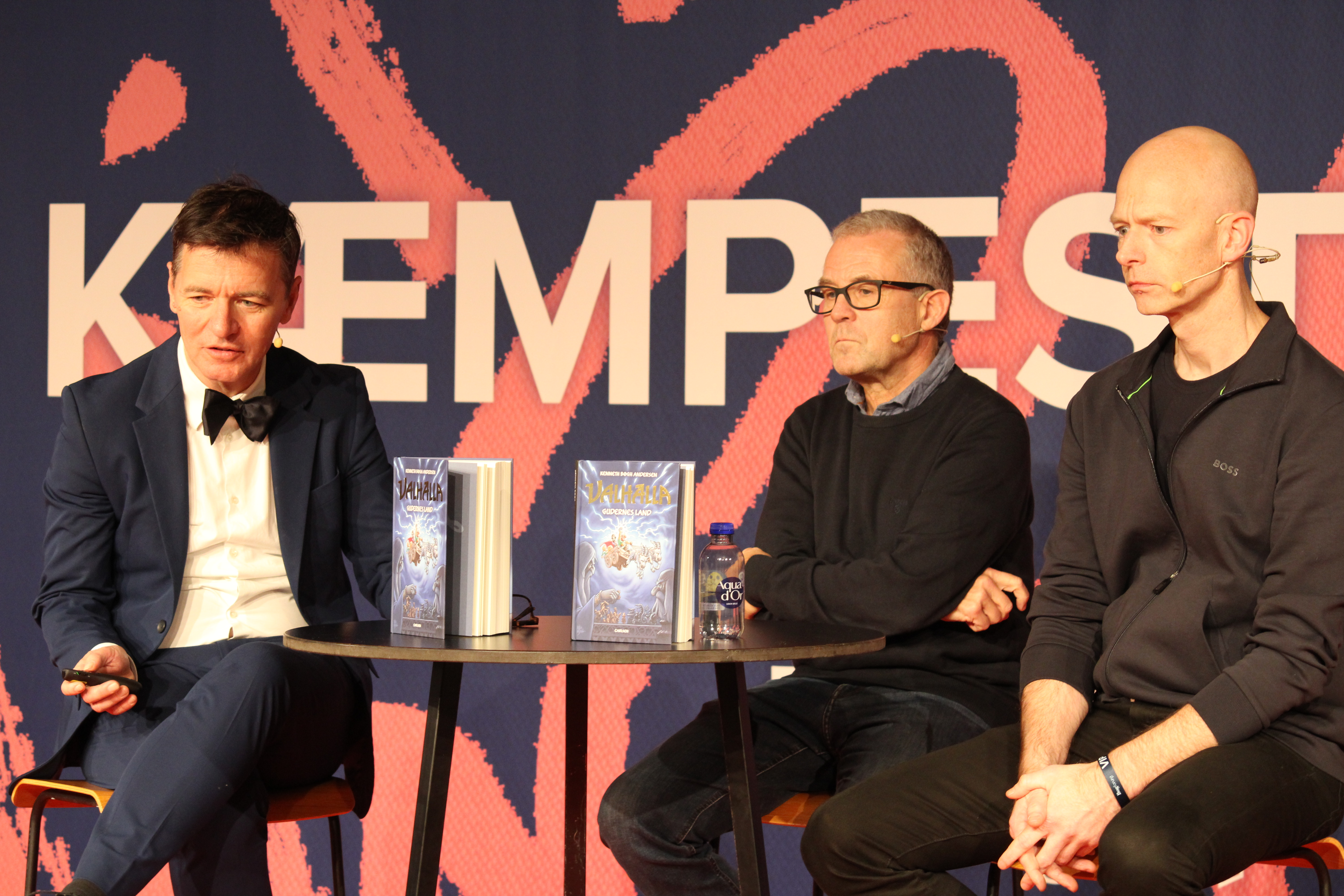
Bøgh Andersen next to cartoonist Peter Madsen at Bogforum 2025 in Bella Center

Andersen is best known his six-volume Great Devil War series, which began with The Devil's Apprentice in 2005. The first book of the series has been optioned for both a live-action and animated film adaptation, and the series as a whole has been optioned for a live-action series adaptation, though the project is currently indefinitely on hiatus due to disinterest from streaming platforms. The Great Devil War were the first of Andersen's novels to be translated and released in English, the translations initially being released by self-publishing on Amazon. In 2018, when Andersen hired a traditional American publishing agent, Jennifer Lyons of Lyons Literary Agency, the books were pulled from the platform in favor of looking for a means of getting them published traditionally in English. All six novels have been translated into English, though only the first five were published. Tantor Audio, subsidiary of Tantor Media, produced adubiook versions of the five books that were translated into English, narrated by Jeffrey Kafer, which are still available through Amazon's Audible service.

Despite several years of representation by Lyons, the series did not succeed in garnering interest from U.S. publishers, and in 2025, six years after initially recalling the books, Andersen reacquired the English-language publishing rights from Lyons and decided to reinstate the English editions himself. He announced the decision with a promotional image of all volumes in the series on his oficial English Facebook page. Four days later, on November 29, 2025, he released another post on his English page that went into more detail about what had happened, and gave a release schedule for each book in the series, specifying the month and year for each volume, including the sixth book, which marks the first time that the English translation of The Fallen Devil will be made available. According to the post, Andersen had decided to go with Amazon's on-demand publication service again, and this time also made the books available in hardcover format. Earlier on that same day, Andersen had already made available the English editions of the first two books, The Devil's Apprentice and The Die of Death. The republication also marks the first time that the English translations were made available in hardcover format. The republication was scheduled to take place throughout late 2025 and early 2026, beginning on November 29, 2025 and culminating with the sixth and final volume, The Fallen Devil, in April 2026. Andersen theorized that the lack of interest from U.S. publishers was because they did not feel it was appropriate to publish a coming-of-age story set in Hell that combined a cozy hometown atmosphere with a sympathethic protral of Lucifer.

In Denmark, the Great Devil War book series was groundbreaking because of the way it addressed topics such as life and death, good and evil, faith and knowledge, the afterlife, and much more, in a philosophical way, both contrasting them and explaining why most of them cannot exist without the other, on a level that both youth and adult readers could understand, and therefore the first volume of the series, The Devil's Apprentice, was introduced into the curriculum of the majority of Danish folkeskole schools, both in the primary (5th–6th grade) and secondary grades (7th–9th grade). To this day, it is one of the best-selling and most widely read Danish fantasy novels and Danish books in general. The books are also known for the way they present concepts, events, beings and people known from Christianity, Judaism and a wide range of other mythologies (Christian Taoism, Norse mythology, Greek mythology etc.) in a partly respectable and faithful manner and humorously quirky way. The series also uses a wide range of supplementary and sometimes apocryphal texts, primarily from Christianity and Judaism, for research, including the Talmud and Zohar. Andersen also employed theological as well as more popular though non-biblical interpretations of the Bible into the work, such as the idea of Adam and Eve being immortal until eating of the Tree of Knowledge of Good and Evil, or the medieval concept of the Devil having once been an angel who was cast out of Heaven and given the name "Lucifer", which was made most famous by John Milton in his epic poem Paradise Lost, another influence on the series, with it even containing his own retelling of its story in The Wrongful Death. Although many of the mentions or retellings of Biblical narratives are mostly faithful to the original texts, Andersen changed them in certain places sometimes in order to either connect them more to his general worldbuilding, to put a humorous spin on them, or to make a statement about the idea of free will and belief. A central concept through the novels is the idea that the faith of sapient beings, primarily humankind, shifts reality, and thus humankind has created God but God has also created humankind since the majority of humans believe it is so, and every mythology, afterlife, mythological creature, person or god has existed or still exist, however just in their own under- or sub-world, all connected through a nexus of stairwells in a dark space, though the settings of the series are still the Earth, Hell and Paradise, with Hell serving as the primary location. Another major inspiration for the books was Dante Alighieri's epic poem The Divine Comedy, especially in regards to the concept the condemned souls in Hell being punished in accordance with their crimes and sins, and in relation to the visual description of Hell but also in particular Purgatory. He also used the being of Geryon exactly as he appears in the Inferno part of Dante's poem in the second book of the series, The Die of Death.

The Geryon of Dante's 14th century epic poem Inferno bears no resemblance to any previous writings. Here, Geryon has become the Monster of Fraud, a beast with the paws of a bear or lion, the body of a wyvern, and a scorpion's poisonous sting at the tip of his tail, but with the face of an "honest man" (similar to a manticore).

The Devil's Apprentice follows a boy named Philip Engel (Danish: Filip Engell) who is so good that Jesus Christ might have been considered a vandal in comparison. One week, the worst bully of Philip's school, "Devil-Sam", decide to select him as the victim, called "the Comdened of the Week", and terrorizes him every day. At the same time, in Hell the Devil has somehow been afflicted with a terminal illness despite his immortality, and so in secret he decides to find an apprentice and heir that can take over from him when he dies. He decides to select a human rather than a devil, knowing that a devil may be "too evil," and his choice has fallen on Sam. However, by mistake Philip ends up being killed instead of Sam and ends up in Hell, to his horror. Lucifer is forced to take in Philip as his apprentice, because he only had one chance to take a human soul, and so he begins to attempt to teach him the ways of evil, however it is proves so difficult that it only speeds up his terminal illness. Eventually, Philip discovers a plot against the Devil's throne. The subsequent books depicts Philip's further journeys in the afterlife and the titular "Great Devil War," a conflcit between the devils inhabiting Hell itself.

Kenneth Bøgh Andersen initially had the idea to write a story set in Hell about someone who has to become the Devil's pupil or apprentice while reading Little Lucifer by Bent Haller, a classic literary work without any fantastical elements in which, at one point, the protagonist is called "Djævelens lærling", or in English: "The devil's apprentice", and the sentence immediately prompted Andersen to think about how interesting of an idea it would be if someone literally had die, go to Hell and then be forced to be the apprentice of Satan. He wanted to write more than one book, though only had the ideas for the first one to begin with, so when pitching the idea to the publisher Høst & Søn, an imprint for youth and children's books under Rosinante & Co., he wrote in it "Første bind af Den Store Djævlekrig", in English "The first book of The Great Devil War" in the hopes that they would be interested in him writing more than one volume and potentially a trilogy, and it worked. He chose "The Great Devil War" not because he had any idea of what it referred to but simply because it sounded interesting and cool, though after writing just the first book, he was forced to delve deeper into the world on the other side he'd started building up in the first volume and it didn't take him long until he figured out where it would lead him and what the conflict of the Great Devil War would be.

The marketing surrounding the first volume had described the series as a trilogy, but some time after the release of The Devil's Appeentice, Andersen realised he would need four books to tell the whole story, and he had soon laid out a structure for the four books. Due to the series being described as a trilogy at the time, Andersen saw a chance to surprise his readership with a cliffhanger at the end of the third book, with a war brewing and the main protagonist being forced to remain in the afterlife, which worked since the main character had returned to his life on Earth at the end of the two the previous books. Then, in book four, the titular conflict between the devils happened.

The fourth book was meant to be the definitive end of the story, however throughout the writing of all four books, Andersen had been reading several stories in the Bible that he had wanted to use in the series but could not find anyway to fit together with any of the other ideas present in the books, so he had shelved them. A major one of these ideas was the story of Jesus Christ's resurrectio nof Lazarus from the Gospel of John. Even though he had announced that The Angel of Evil would be the final book, and had resigned himself to the fact that it would be so, only a short time after the book's release, he got even new ideas which caused him to feel that he still had yet to tell enough about Philip Engel's adventure in Hell. He had wanted to write something like an epilogue to the series, to show how Philip felt after his many experiences in the afterlife, many of which were horrifying, dark and depressing. And so he decided to write another book, which he soon realized would have to become two, and five years later, he announced the first one, surprising his readership. The first of the two books, The Fallen Angel, was released in 2015 and ended in a cliffhanger that announced that the story would be continued in a sixth installment. The sixth and final book, The Fallen Devil, was released a year later in 2016.

In October 2019, the first book in The Great Devil War, The Devil's Apprentice, was staged as a major stage musical, with a book written by Mads Æbeløe Nielsen and Philip LaZebnik, music and lyrics by Madeline Myers and directed by Peter Langdal, and starring Kasper Leisner as Lucifer, Oscar Dietz as Philip Engel and Sofie Amalie Kronborg Christen as Satina Dargue. The musical garnered positive reviews and won multiple awards for the 2019 BroadwayWorld Denmark Awards, voted on by users of the BroadwayWorld website, including Best Professional Musical.

In 2022, Kenneth Bøgh Andersen's books were the fifth most loaned in Danish libraries and thus the fifth-highest earning author in the country from library loans (665,589.64 DKK, US$96,680.85).

According to Andersen, his own introduction to horror fiction was the author Stephen King, whom he still considers one of the true masters of the genre.

During the initial English publication of The Great Devil War, the American author Michael Grant, known for the Gone series, read The Devil's Apprentice and contacted Andersen, praising it as "Thrilling, fascinating, profound and still somehow funny all the way through." Subsequently, during the re-issue of the English translation, The Devil's Apprentice was read by Eoin Colfer, the Irish author of the Artemis Fowl series, who likewise wrote to Andersen with praise, saying "Hi Kenneth, I am reading The Devil’s Apprentice and thoroughly enjoying it… An epic fantasy in the classic mould of Tolkien or Stroud. Wonderful characters, exciting world building and headlong adventures. Breathtaking action fantasy with some laughs thrown in too! … I love this. An instant classic."

=== Television and film work ===
Andersen wrote the script for the Christmas musical stage play Jueønsket (English: The Christmas Wish), which was staged in 2002 by the Danish Eventyrteatret stage performing company, which specializes in producing family stage plays and stage musicals exclusively performed by children and young adults with special talents for singing, dancing and acting on a professional level, with the purpose of training them for a future career on the stage.

Andersen has a short uncredited cameo as a police officer in the first Antboy film from 2013, during the scene in which the main villain, "the Flea", portrayed by Nicolas Bro, abducts the girl Ida and flees her house with her.

Andersen assisted the lighting department on the Danish TV2 Charlie crime detective television series The Sommerdahl Murders on three separate episodes of season 6.

In 2022, a Danish children's horror television and streaming series Felix og Åmanden (English: Felix and the Åmand) was released by the streaming and cable package service YouSee around Halloween, written and produced by Andersen and directed by Christian Grønvall, who previously directed the Christmas calendar series Tinka and the Game of Kings (2019) and Tinka and the Mirror of the Soul which premiered in December 2022.

== Bibliography ==
- Nidhugs Slaver (not released 2000)
- En rejse gennem natten 1 – Carmarde fortæller (Høst & Søn 2001)
- Juleønsket – musical (Høst & Søn 2002)
- De Hvide Mænd (Høst & Søn 2003)
- Himmelherren (Høst & Søn 2004)
- Det sultne maleri og andre gys (Høst & Søn 2005)
- En rejse gennem natten 2 – Carmarde fortæller (Høst & Søn 2006)
- Evig hævn og andre gys (Forum 2006)
- Heksens Briller (Ordet Fanger 2007)
- Sisdæ sjangsæ (Dansklærerforeningen 2007)
- Det gemmer sig i mørket og andre gys (Forum 2008)
- Bøddel (Tellerup 2008)
- Juleønsket (Høst & Søn 2008)
- 78° (2009)
- Dødens sang og andre gys (Høst & Søn 2009)
- Ved foden af regnbuen (Dansk Forfatterforening 2010)
- Slut (Ibis 2010)
- SMS fra Helvede (SMSpress 2010)
- Billedet (2010)
- Forfulgt (2010)
- Den Sidste Dag (2010)
- Skæbnemageren (2010)
- Helt Forkert Nummer Og Andre Gys (2012)
- Fra den mørke side (2012)
- Julemandens Død (2013)
- Den sidste tryllekunst (2013)
- Tempus fugit (2013)
- SMS fra Julemanden (2013)
- SMS fra Antboy (2014)

=== Antboy ===
- The Bite of The Ant (Høst & Søn 2007, English edition 14 April 2015)
- Operation Skæbnespil (Høst & Søn 2007)
- Maskefald (Høst & Søn 2007)
- Tissemyren Vender Tilbage (Høst & Søn 2011)
- Slim, Snot og Superkræfter (Høst & Søn 2011)
- Helte og Skurke (Høst & Søn 2012)

Antboy vender tilbage

- Myrekryb og Ormehuller (2020)
- Fortidens skygger (2020)
- Det endelige opgør (2021)

=== The Great Devil War ===
- The Devil's Apprentice (Høst & Søn 2005, English edition 11 October 2018 (ebook), 19 October 2018 (paperback), English edition re-released November 29, 2025 (e-book, paperback, hardback))
- The Die of Death (Høst & Søn 2007, English edition 11 October 2018, English edition re-released November 29, 2025 (e-book, paperback, hardback))
- The Wrongful Death (Høst & Søn 2009, English edition 5 April 2019, English edition re-released January 30, 2026 (e-book, paperback, hardback))
- The Angel of Evil (Høst & Søn 29 April 2010, English edition 20 October 2019, English edition re-released March 13, 2026 (e-book, paperback, hardback))
- The Fallen Angel (Høst & Søn 2015, English edition 28 May 2020, English edition re-released May 1, (e-book, paperback, hardback))
- The Fallen Devil (Høst & Søn 2015, English edition released June 12, 2026 (e-book, paperback, hardback))

=== Slaget i Caïssa ===
- Åbningen – Slaget i Caïssa 1 (Høst & Søn 2000)
- Tågemandens død – Slaget i Caïssa 2 (Høst & Søn 2000)
- Skakmat – Slaget i Caïssa 3 (Høst & Søn 2000)

=== Classic horror novel retellings ===
==== Genfortalt Trilogy ====
- Frankenstein genfortalt (Politikens Forlag 16 September 2021)
- Jekyll og Hyde genfortalt (Politikens Forlag 30 March 2022)
- Dracula genfortalt (Politikens Forlag 14 September 30, 2023)

=== Grimm Storytel Original audiobooks ===
- Grimm: Grumme eventyr genfortalt for gamle og unge, co-written with Benni Bødker (Gyldendal 2019)
- Grimm II – Eventyr gendigtet af Benni Bødker og Kenneth Bøgh Andersen, co-written with Benni Bødker (Storytel 2019)
- Grimm – Nogle historier er så modbydelige ..., co-written with Benni Bødker (Gyldendal 1 October 2024)
- Grimm: The Story of a Boy Who Went Out in the World to Learn Fear, co-written with Benni Bødker (Storytel Original 2021, English edition by Storytel 13 January 2025)
- Grimm: The Girl Without Hands, co-written with Benni Bødker (Storytel Original 2021, English edition by Storytel 13 January 2025)
- Grimm: Godfather Death, co-written' with Benni Bødker (Storytel Original 2021, English edition by Storytel 13 January 2025)
- Grimm: Fitcher's Bird, co-written with Benni Bødker (Storytel Original 2021, English edition by Storytel 13 January 2025)
- Grimm: The Singing Bone, co-written with Benni Bødker (Storytel Original 2021, English edition by Storytel 13 January 2025)
- Grimm: Little Red Riding Hood, co-written with Benni Bødker (Storytel Original 2021, English edition by Storytel 13 January 2025)
- Grimm: The Robber Bridegroom, co-written with Benni Bødker (Storytel Original 2021, English edition by Storytel 13 January 2025)
- Grimm: Rapunzel, co-written with Benni Bødker (Storytel Original 2021, English edition by Storytel 14 January 2025)

== Filmography ==
=== Film ===
Year	Title	Role	Notes
2013	Antboy	Police officer (cameo)	

=== Television ===
Year	Title	Role	Notes
2022	Felix og Åmanden	Writer and producer	
2025	The Sommerdahl Murders	Lighting assistant	Season 6 Episode 1: SoMe – part 1, Season 6 Episode 3: The Back of the Medallion – part 1, Season 6 Episode 4: The Back of the Medallion – part 2

== Awards ==
- 2001: Æreslisten, Danish Ministry of Culture's Children and Youth Book Award (Slaget i Caïssa 1–3)
- 2005: Æreslisten, Danish Ministry of Culture's Children and Youth Book Award (Himmelherren)
- 2005: The Orla Award – Best Young Adult Novel 2005 (Himmelherren)
- 2005: The Danish Arts Council's Worker's Grant
- 2006: The Municipal School Library Association's Author Award (The Devil's Apprentice)
- 2006: Danish Arts Council's Worker's Grant (from "the 10-million pool")
- 2006: The Orla Award – Best Children's Novel 2006 (Djævelens lærling)
- 2007: Publisher Rosinante & Co's grant
- 2009: The BMF's Children's Book Award 2009 (The Wrongful Death)
- 2009: The Orla Award – Best Fantasy Novel 2009 (The Die of Death)
- 2010: Danish Arts Council's Children's Literature Pool grant
- 2014: The Danish Arts Foundation's Worker's Grant
- 2016: The Danish Arts Foundation's Worker's Grant
- 2017: The Blixen Awards – Children and Youth Novel of the Year 2017 (The Fallen Devil)
- 2017: The Claus Deleuran Award – Best Danish Comic or Graphic Novel Debut 2017 (Skæbnemageren)
- 2020: The Danish Arts Foundation's Worker's Grant
- 2021: The Danish Arts Foundation's Worker's Grant
- 2023: The Danish Arts Foundation's Worker's Grant for Children's Literature
