= Benny (surname) =

Benny is a surname. Notable people with the surname include:

- Benjamin Benny (1869–1935), member of Australian Senate
- Bob Benny (1926–2011), Belgian singer and musical theatre performer born Emilius Wagemans
- D. C. Benny, American stand-up comedian born Ben Wartofsky
- Eric Benny (born 1978), former footballer and former manager of the India national football team
- Grace Benny (1872–1944), first woman elected to local government in Australia
- Jack Benny (1894–1974), American comedian, vaudeville performer and actor born Benjamin Kubelsky
- Rayshaun Benny (born 2002), American football player
- Tasmyn Benny (born 1998), boxer from New Zealand

== See also ==
- Bennie (surname)
