= Banny =

Banny may refer to:

== People ==
- Banny deBrum (1956–2011), ambassador of the Republic of the Marshall Islands to the United States
- Charles Konan Banny, former Prime Minister of Côte d'Ivoire
- Jean Konan Banny, Ivorian politician

== Places ==
Additionally, Banny (masculine), Bannaya (feminine), or Bannoye (neuter) may refer to:

- Bannoye, until 1938, name of Sviatohirsk, a town in Donetsk Oblast, Ukraine
- Banny, Russia (Bannoye), several rural localities in Russia
- Lake Bannoye, a lake in the Republic of Bashkortostan, Russia

== See also ==
- Bani (disambiguation)
