= Behne =

Behne is a surname. Notable people with the surname include:

- Adolf Behne (1885–1948), German architect and architectural writer
- Frederick Behne (1873–1918), fireman first class serving in the United States Navy who received the Medal of Honor for bravery

== See also ==
- Bene (disambiguation)
