= City of Glenelg =

City of Glenelg South Australia
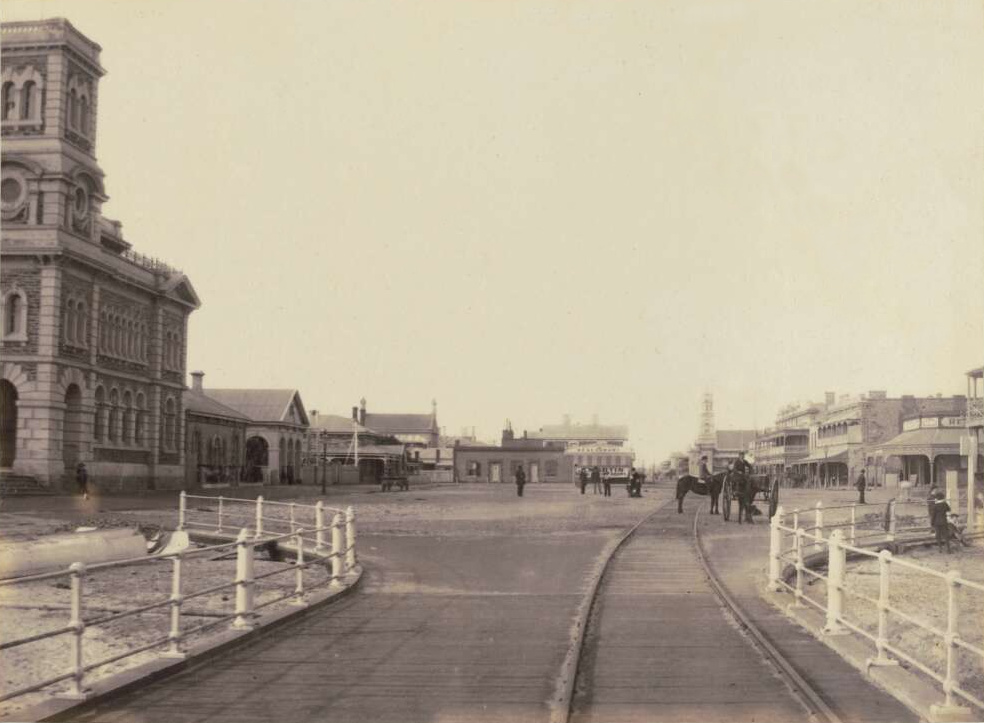
- Glenelg town centre, from the jetty, circa 1883

- Coordinates: 34.982°S 138.516°E
- Population: 9,816 (1930)
  - Density: 2,890/km^{2} (7,480/sq mi)
- Established: 1855
- Abolished: 1997
- Area: 3.4 km^{2} (1.3 sq mi)(1930)
- Council seat: Glenelg
LGAs around City of Glenelg:
Henley and Grange	West Torrens
City of Glenelg	Marion
Brighton	Marion

The City of Glenelg was a local government area in South Australia seated at the Adelaide sea-side township of Glenelg from 1855 until 1997.

== History ==
The Corporate Town of Glenelg was proclaimed on 23 August 1855 by severance from the District Council of West Torrens and District Council of Brighton. When first proclaimed, the corporate town extended over sections 184, 204 and 205 of the Hundred of Noarlunga. At the time, section 204 was already bisected west to east by the "main road leading from Adelaide to Glenelg", which ultimately was called Anzac Highway. The initial town boundaries extended from approximately the modern Kibby Avenue and Margaret Street (Glenelg North), in the north, to the modern Boundary Road and Yarrum Grove (Somerton Park), in the south.

Five years later, the Corporate Town of Brighton was proclaimed immediately to the south of Glenelg council.

In the half century from 1900 the Glenelg council was enlarged by four separate annexations of portions of the District Council of West Torrens, its north eastern neighbour.

The municipality of Glenelg ultimately became the City of Glenelg when it crossed the required population threshold in the early 1900s.

Glenelg and its southern coastal neighbour, the City of Brighton, were amalgamated in 1997 to become the City of Holdfast Bay, which retained the two civic centres at Glenelg and Brighton.
