= Benjamin Benny =

Australian politician

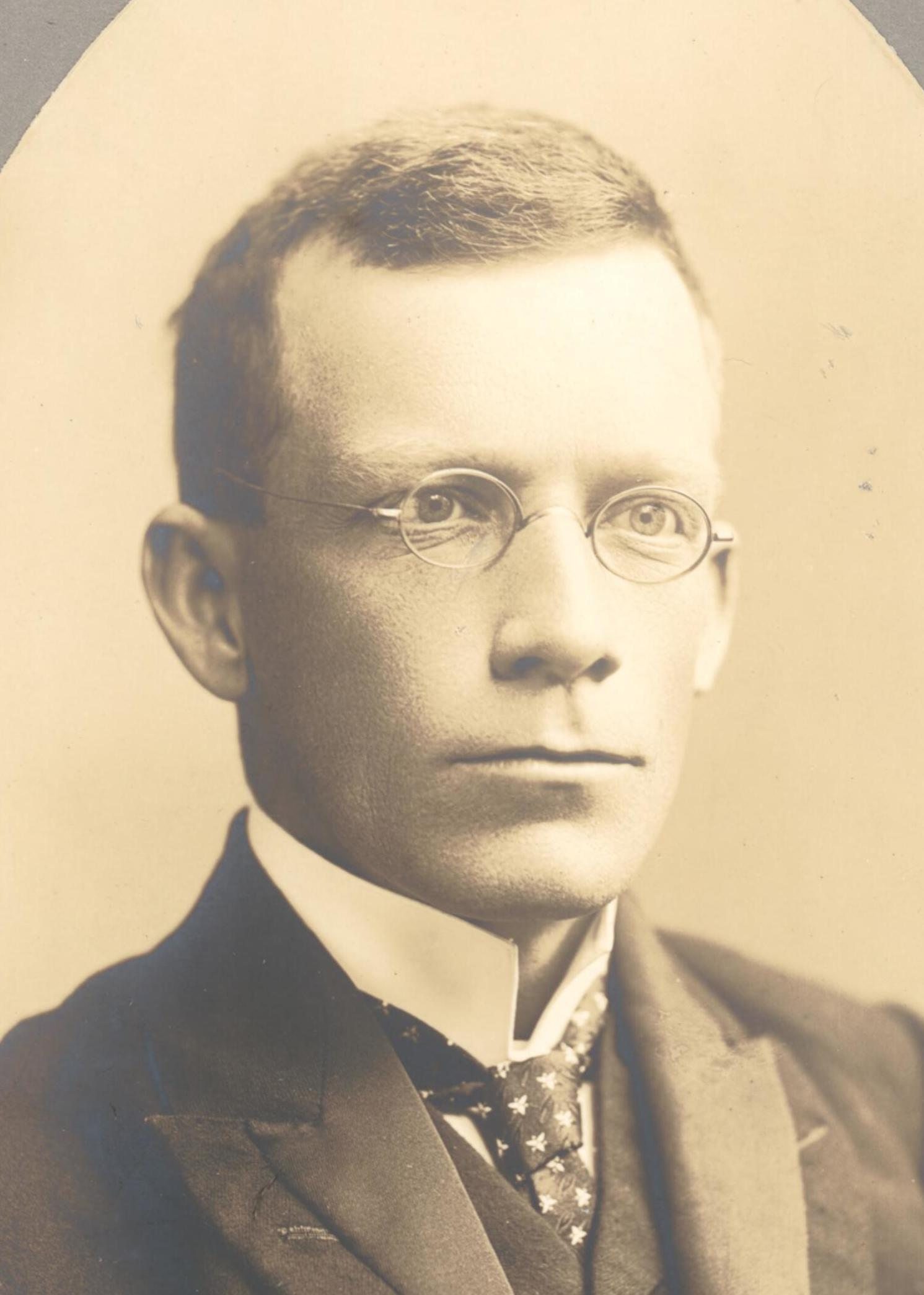

Senator for South Australia
- In office 1 July 1920 – 26 January 1926
- Succeeded by: Alexander McLachlan

Personal details
- Born: 21 October 1869 Aldinga, South Australia
- Died: 10 February 1935 (aged 65) Adelaide, South Australia
- Party: Nationalist
- Spouse: Susan Grace Anderson (m. 1896)
- Education: University of Adelaide
- Profession: Solicitor

Benjamin Benny (21 October 1869 – 10 February 1935) was an Australian lawyer and politician. He served as a Senator for South Australia from 1920 to 1926, representing the Nationalist Party. A few months after his resignation from the Senate, he was convicted of fraudulent conversion and jailed for three years with hard labour.

== Early life ==
Benny was born on 21 October 1869 in Aldinga, South Australia. He was one of seven children born to Susanna (née Anderson) and George Benny; his father was a Free Presbysterian minister and schoolteacher.

Benny began his education at the public school in Morphett Vale. Following his father's death in 1879, his uncle William Benny paid for his education at Thomas Caterer's Commercial College in Norwood. He began studying law in 1887, serving his articles of clerkship at his uncle's law firm and obtaining a certificate in law from the University of Adelaide in 1891. Following the death of his uncle in 1898, Benny took over the practice. He was a justice of the peace and served on the Brighton Town Council, including as mayor from 1902 to 1905.

== Politics ==
In 1919, he was elected to the Australian Senate as a Nationalist Senator for South Australia. He did not recontest in 1925 and although his term was due to finish on 30 June 1926 he resigned from parliament on 26 January 1926 due to ill health, and was replaced by Alexander McLachlan. In June 1926 Benny was convicted of fraudulent conversion of trust funds and sentenced to three years' jail, and declared insolvent.

== Later life ==
He married his cousin Susan Grace Anderson, known as Grace Benny. After his imprisonment, she opened an employment agency to support her family, prior to this she had never worked for a living. She had in 1919 made history as the first woman to be elected to local government (the Seacliff ward of the Brighton Council) in Australia.

Benny died in 1935.
