= Bani (given name) =

Bani is a given name, mostly but not exclusively feminine. It may refer to:

== Women ==
- Bani Abidi (born 1971), Pakistani artist
- Bani Basu (born 1939), Bengali Indian author, essayist, critic, poet, translator and professor
- Bani Thani, 18th century Indian singer and poet
- Bani Yadav (born 1971), Indian rally driver, motorsports promoter and social rights advocate

== Men ==
- Bani Lozano (born 1982), Honduran footballer
