= Beni, Nepal =

Beni, Nepal may refer to:

- Beni, Myagdi, central Nepal
- Beni, Sagarmatha, western Nepal

== See also ==
- Beni (disambiguation)
