= Bani, Mirpur =

Village in Azad Kashmir, Pakistan

Banni is a village in the Mirpur Tehsil of Mirpur District of Azad Kashmir, Pakistan.

== Demography ==
According to 1998 census of Kashmir, its population was 1,389.
