= Bannoye, Altai Republic =

Bannoye Банное
- Selo
- Location within Altai Republic Location within Russia
- Coordinates: 50°22′N 84°52′E
- Country: Russia
- Region: Altai Republic
- District: Ust-Koksinsky District
- Time zone: UTC+7:00

Bannoye (Russian: Банное; Altay: Ак-Сас, Ak-Sas) is a rural locality (a selo) in Ust-Koksinsky District, the Altai Republic, Russia. The population was 332 as of 2016. There are 8 streets.

== Geography ==
Bannoye is located 81 km northwest of Ust-Koksa (the district's administrative centre) by road. Abay is the nearest rural locality.
