= Bene (Crete) =

Coordinates: 35°00′07″N 25°04′15″E

Bene (Ancient Greek: Βήνη) was a town of ancient Crete, in the neighbourhood of Gortyn, to which it was subject, only known as the birthplace of the poet Rhianus.

The site of Bene is tentatively located near modern Kastellos, Panagia.
