= Maurice Béné =

French politician

Maurice Béné (24 August 1884 in Sèvres – 19 December 1960) was a French politician. He represented the Radical Party in the Constituent Assembly elected in 1946 and in the National Assembly from 1946 to 1958.
