= Bennie (surname) =

Bennie is a surname which may refer to:

- Andrew Bennie (born 1956), New Zealand horseman
- Bob Bennie (1900–1972), Scottish footballer
- Charlie Bennie (1887–1963), Australian rules footballer
- Daniel Bennie (born 2006), Australian soccer player
- John Bennie (footballer) (1896–?), Scottish footballer
- John Bennie (missionary) (1796–1869), Presbyterian missionary and Xhosa linguist
- Peter Bennie (1898–?), Scottish footballer

== See also ==
- Benny (surname)
