= Hjernerystelsesforeningen =

Hjernerystelsesforeningen The Danish Concussion Association
- Founded: 2013
- Founder: Kim Friedrich, Nicolai Aaen
- Type: Non-governmental organization, Non-profit organization
- Purpose: Concussion; Post-concussive syndrome
- Location: Copenhagen, Denmark
- Region served: Denmark
- Method: Funds collection
- Members: 1.000
- Key people: Nicolai Aaen, Kim Friedrich
- Employees: 4
- Website: hjernerystelsesforeningen.dk

Hjernerystelsesforeningen (English: Danish Concussion Association) is a Danish non-profit and non-governmental organization that strives to help people suffering from concussion and post-concussive syndrome, as well as working towards better understanding and a cure. Founded in 2013, the volunteers and staff nationwide have helped to provide support and resources to those affected.

== Cooperations ==
In 2016 they partnered with Spillerforeningen, Håndboldspillerforeningen and Danske Elitesportsudøveres Forening to help elite athletes suffering from concussion.

In 2017 they partnered with Danmarks Ishockey Union and Dansk Håndbold Forbund, in an effort to reduced the concussion injuries in Danish ice hockey and team handball. This partnership was criticised by the players organizations for being to shallow.

== In the media ==
The organization is frequently used in the Danish media, in concussion-related topics, and has been featured in the written press extensively, as well as in television-media. Topics range from helping the patients, helping next of kin, affecting the politicians, and engaging in concussions in sport.

== Chairmen ==
Chairman	Accession	Stopped
Kim Friedrich	2013	2017
Ronni Lykke Bødker	2017	2019
Kim Friedrich	2019	
