= Bené (association footballer) =

Brazilian footballer (born 1941)

Personal information
- Full name: Benedito Lacerda Ribeiro
- Date of birth: 16 February 1941 (age 85)
- Position: Forward

Senior career*
| Years | Team | Apps | (Gls) |
| 1963–1970 | Leixões | 157 | (11) |
| 1970–1974 | Porto | 81 | (2) |
| 1974–1975 | Sporting Espinho | 14 | (2) |
| 1975–1976 | Leixões | 26 | (0) |
| 1976–1977 | Lamego | | |
| 1977–1978 | Leixões | | |
- * Club domestic league appearances and goals

Benedito Lacerda Ribeiro (born 16 February 1941), known as Bené is a Brazilian former professional footballer who played as a forward. He played 13 seasons and 278 games in the Primeira Liga for Leixões, Porto and Sporting Espinho.

== Career ==
Bené made his Primeira Liga debut for Leixões on 27 October 1963 in a game against Porto.
