= Boniabad, South Khorasan =

Boniabad بني اباد
- Village
- Location within Iran
- Coordinates: 32°47′19″N 59°20′43″E
- Country: Iran
- Province: South Khorasan
- County: Birjand
- Bakhsh: Central
- Rural District: Baqeran

Population (2006)
  - Total: 37
- Time zone: UTC+3:30 (IRST)
  - Summer (DST): UTC+4:30 (IRDT)

Boniabad (Persian: بني اباد, also Romanized as Bonīābād; also known as Banī) is a village in Baqeran Rural District, in the Central District of Birjand County, South Khorasan Province, Iran. At the 2006 census, its population was 37, in 13 families.
