= Charlie Bennie =

Australian rules footballer

Personal information
- Full name: Charles Henry Thomas Bennie
- Born: 4 April 1887; Lancefield, Victoria
- Died: 13 January 1963 (aged 75); Ascot Vale, Victoria
- Original team: Ascot Juniors

Playing career^{1}
Years	Club	Games (Goals)
1912	Richmond	8 (5)
- ^{1} Playing statistics correct to the end of 1912.

Charles Henry Thomas Bennie (4 April 1887 – 13 January 1963) was an Australian rules footballer who played with Richmond in the Victorian Football League (VFL).
