= Bani (surname) =

Bani is a surname. Notable people with the surname include:

- Andrei Bani (born 2002), Romanian footballer
- Eugenio Bani (born 1991), Italian racing cyclist
- Gilbert Bani (born 1986), stage name A-Q, Nigerian rapper and songwriter
- Heinz Bäni (1936–2014), Swiss footballer
- Jimi Bani (fl. 2006–present), Indigenous Australian actor
- John Bani (born 1941), Vanuatuan former politician, President of Vanuatu from 1999 to 2004
- Mattia Bani (born 1993), Italian footballer
- Peter Bäni (born 1945), Swiss retired slalom canoeist
- Prosper Douglas Bani, Ghanaian politician and United Nations international aid and development manager, former Minister of Interior for Ghana
- Zahra Bani (born 1979), Somalian-born Italian javelin thrower
