= Benny (footballer) =

Portuguese footballer

Personal information
- Full name: Bernardo Pereira Silvano
- Date of birth: 14 April 1996 (age 30)
- Place of birth: Leiria, Portugal
- Height: 1.92 m (6 ft 4 in)
- Position: Centre-back

Team information
- Current team: Marinhense
- Number: 6

Youth career
- 2004–2014: União Leiria

Senior career*
Years	Team	Apps	(Gls)
2014–2017	União de Leiria	32	(2)
2017	Benfica Castelo Branco	14	(2)
2017–2020	Arouca	48	(5)
2020–2021	Torreense	21	(0)
2021–2022	União de Leiria	20	(0)
2022–2023	Académica de Coimbra	7	(1)
2023–	Marinhense	17	(1)
- * Club domestic league appearances and goals as of 22:02, 12 October 2023 (UTC)

Bernardo Pereira Silvano (born 14 April 1996), commonly known as Benny is a Portuguese footballer who plays as a centre-back for Campeonato de Portugal club Marinhense.

== Club career ==
Born in Leiria, Benny started his career with the youth setup of local club União de Leiria and was promoted to the senior squad in 2014 which played in the third tier. On 31 January 2017, he joined Benfica Castelo Branco of the same tier.

On 19 June 2017, Benny moved a tier up and moved to Arouca. On 26 November, he made his league debut, playing the whole 90 minutes of a 2–0 victory against Santa Clara.

== Club statistics ==
As of match played on 12 August 2018

Club	Season	League			Cup		Other		Total	
Club	Season	Division	Apps	Goals	Apps	Goals	Apps	Goals	Apps	Goals
União Leiria	2014–15	Campeonato Nacional	3	0	0	0	—		3	0
União Leiria	2015–16	Campeonato Nacional	23	2	2	1	—		25	3
União Leiria	2016–17	Campeonato Nacional	6	0	2	2	—		8	2
União Leiria	Total		32	2	4	3	—		36	5
Benfica Castelo Branco	2016–17	Campeonato Nacional	13	2	0	0	—		13	2
Arouca	2017–18	LigaPro	10	1	1	0	—		11	1
Arouca	2018–19	LigaPro	1	0	0	0	—		1	0
Arouca	Total		11	1	1	0	—		12	1
Career total			56	5	5	3	0	0	61	8
