= Grace Benny =

Australian politician (1872–1944)

Susan Grace Benny
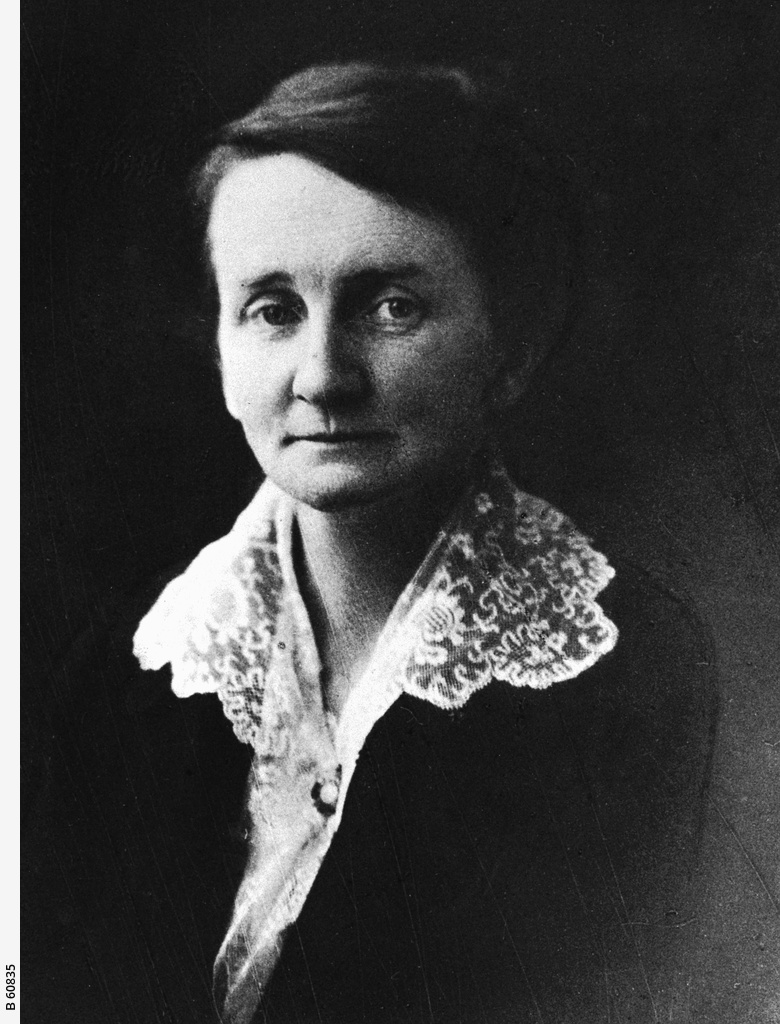
- Susan Grace Benny (SLSA B-60835)
- Born: Susan Grace Anderson; 8 October 1872; Adelaide, South Australia
- Died: 5 November 1944 (aged 72); North Adelaide, South Australia
- Occupations: Councillor, Brighton Council
- Known for: First woman elected to local government in Australia
- Spouse: Benjamin Benny
- Children: 5

Susan Grace Benny, née Anderson, (1872–1944) of Seacliff, South Australia, generally referred to as Grace Benny or S. Grace Benny, was the first woman elected to local government in Australia when she was elected to the Brighton Council in 1919. She represented the Seacliff ward from November 1919 until December 1921.

== Early life ==
Benny was born in the Crown Inn Hotel, Currie Street, Adelaide on 8 October 1872 to Peter Anderson and Agnes Ellen Anderson, née Harriot.

She grew up on the family's sheep station "Springfield", located near Stansbury, Yorke Peninsula. She married her cousin, solicitor Benjamin Benny (21 October 1869 – 10 February 1935), eldest son of the Reverend George Benny, on 16 July 1896, and moved to Adelaide where he worked. The couple moved to Seacliff in Adelaide's south and raised three daughters and two sons.

Benny was active in a range of community and political organisations, and during the First World War was the Honorary Secretary of the Seacliff Cheer-Up Society. She was also a member of the local Progress Association, and spinning and croquet clubs.

== Political career ==
Following World War I, Benny was a member of the Liberal Union Sturt District committee and president of the Brighton Women's Branch of the Liberal Union, and was elected president of the Women's Branch of the South Australian Liberal Union in 1918. During this time she argued strongly for equality of divorce for women, which became law in South Australia in 1918.

Following the lead of her husband, who was mayor of Brighton City Council 1903–1905, Benny became the first female local government councillor in Australia. In November 1919, on petition of ratepayers, she was appointed to represent the newly created South ward (later called Seacliff) of Brighton Council. She stood for election the following month, believing that there was work to be done in the area that only a woman could do. She was duly elected on 22 December 1919, and held this seat at the following election. In 1922 she stood unsuccessfully for mayor, a defeat welcomed by at least one (Catholic) commentator.

As a council member Benny successfully argued for public access to the beach, the installation of electric lights and the allocation of reserves for a children's playground and public garden. She also actively supported the abolition of segregated sea-bathing so that families could swim together.

In 1921 Grace Benny was made a Justice of the Peace, hearing cases relating to state children, police matters and women.

== Controversy ==
Her husband Benjamin Benny was elected to the Australian Senate in 1919, resigning in January 1926 after suffering a stroke. He was immediately sued for misappropriating various trust funds, and in June 1926 was convicted of the fraudulent conversion of Treasury bonds to the value of £1,200, as well as various other trust funds. He was sentenced to three years' gaol, struck off the roll of the Supreme Court, of which he was a practitioner, and declared insolvent. The Benny home "Stoneywood", a 4.25 acres (1.72 ha) property overlooking the Seacliff foreshore reserve, was put up for sale in 1925.

== Later life ==
Following her husband's imprisonment, Benny was forced to rely on money she had inherited to support her children. Although she had never worked for a living, she moved into her husband's law offices in King William Street, Adelaide and opened the "Elite Employment Agency", which enabled her to support her family through the Depression.

Benjamin Benny died in 1935. On 23 February 1940 in Melbourne, Grace married Cecil Ralph Bannister. 20 years her junior, Bannister was a tramway worker and clerk before moving to Adelaide to live with Grace.

Grace Benny died in North Adelaide on 5 November 1944 and was buried in the Scotch cemetery at Morphett Vale.

== Recognition ==
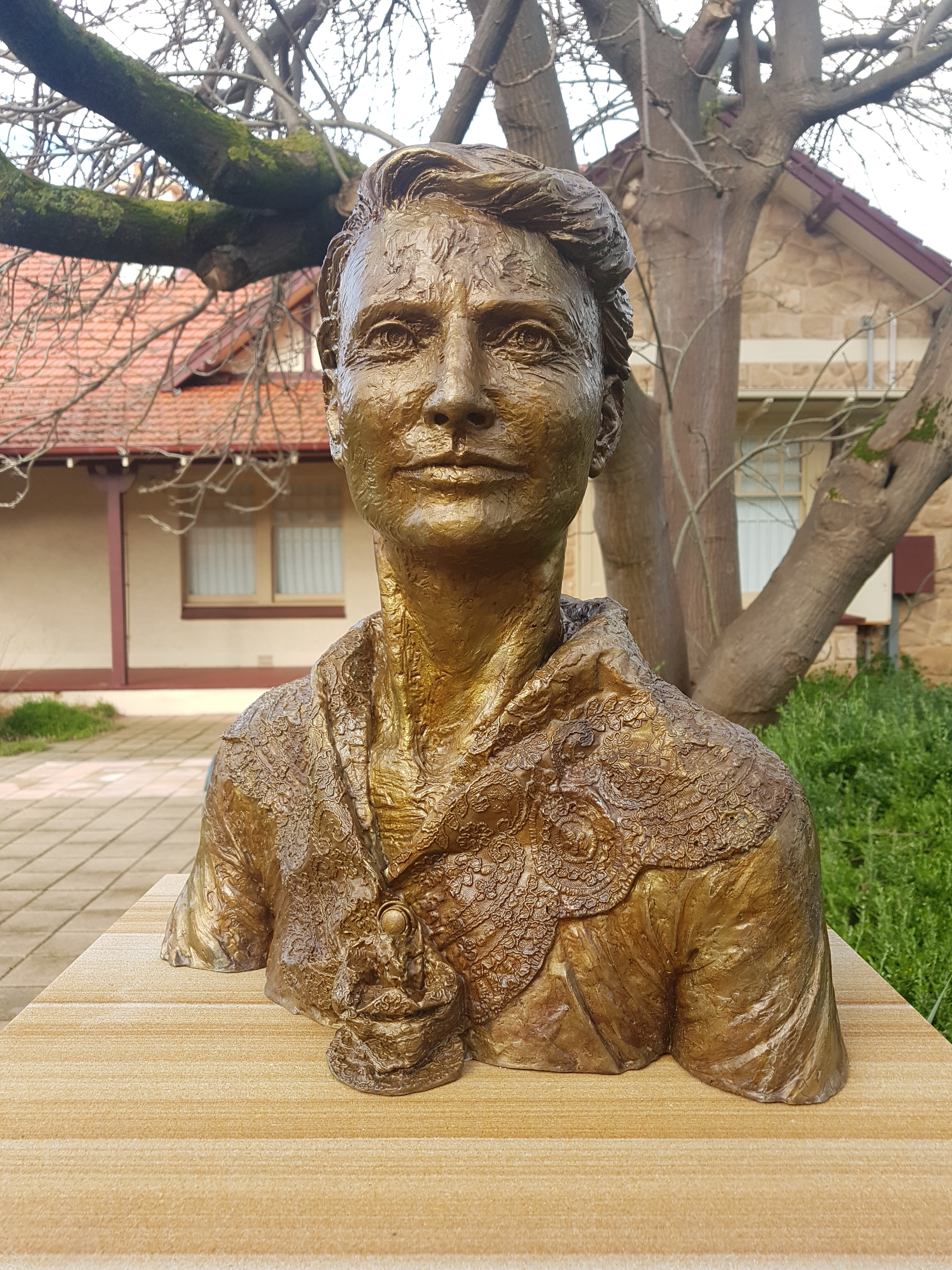
Bronze bust of Grace Benny by Meliesa Judge, unveiled at Brighton in 2017.

- Benny Crescent, South Brighton
- Susan Grace Benny Park, Seacliff Park
- Adelaide City Council plaque on North Terrace near the corner of King William Street, Adelaide
- Grace Benny Scholarship, awarded annually by the Australian Local Government Women's Association (South Australian Branch)
- Bronze bust on a sandstone plinth at 20 Jetty Rd, Brighton, by Meliesa Judge of Liquid Metal Studios. Completed 31 August 2017.
