= Eric Benny =

Indian footballer (born 1978)

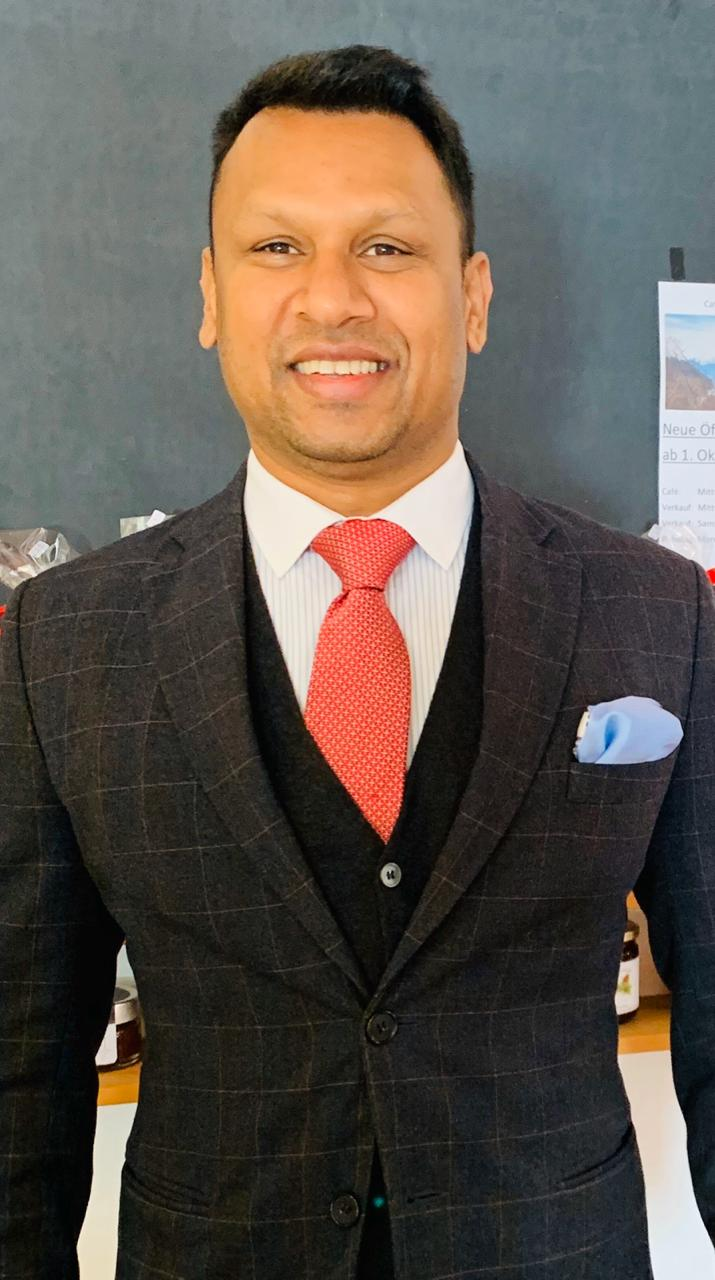
- Benny during the 2010 Asian Games

Personal information
- Date of birth: 7 November 1978 (age 47)
- Place of birth: New Delhi, India
- Height: 1.78 m (5 ft 10 in)

Managerial career
- Years: Team
- 2010–2011: India national football team
- 2011: Indian Arrows

Eric Benny (born 7 November 1978) is an ex-football player and a former manager of the India national football team. He is the founder of 'Eric Benny Sports Management'. Born and brought up in Delhi, he completed his schooling from St. Columbus, New Delhi and graduated from the University of Delhi. He has worked towards promoting grass-root football in India, and has been the manager of the Indian football team during the 2010 Asian Games (Guangzhou, China), and the manager of the team that played the Olympic qualifiers in 2011. He has also worked as a General Manager for the I-League Club, Indian Arrows.

== Career ==
Benny began to play professional football in 1994. He played for Simla Youngs F.C., Royal Rangers and Salgaocar F.C., and the all-age nationals for Delhi state. His professional football career ended because of an injury during a game.

Post recovery, he enrolled into a full-time university program at Delhi University. In his corporate stint, he worked with and serviced large companies like Citibank, American Express, IBM, and Philips within and outside India.

In 2008, Benny entered the world of football administration in India.

In 2009, Benny left corporate job and started a non-profit organization for the former Indian footballers who wanted to make a comeback, and launched the 4v4 leagues.

Asian Games (2010)

In 2010, Benny was appointed the Manager of the India national football team. He and his team represented India at the Guangzhou Asian Games in 2010.

Indian Arrows (2011)

He also led the team as a manager at the Olympic Games qualifiers in 2011. During the 2011 football season, he was appointed the General Manager of the I-league club, the Indian Arrows. Gurpreet Singh Sandhu, Lalrindika Ralte, Milan Singh, Jewel Raja, Manandeep Singh, Raju Gaikwad, Jagroop Singh, and Jeje played during his tenure. The Indian Arrows finished 10th in their first season of professional football.

== Sports business ==
FC Metz (2012)

In 2012, Benny started the Eric Benny Foundation to promote football as a sport in India. The same year, the company partnered with the French Football Club, de Metz. The partnership allowed him to place young Indian footballers at the Metz International Football Academy.

All India football federation (2014)

In 2014, he signed Sunil Chhetri, the captain of the India national football team and the I-league club, Bengaluru FC as the brand ambassador of Eric Benny Sports Management. The same year, Benny was a panelist on the coverage of FIFA World Cup along with Sourav Ganguly, Ashley Westwood and Boria Majumdar for the India Today Group.

FA Level 1 and 2 (2015)

In 2015, Benny received the license of FA Level 1 and 2 – London. He also took the prospective U-17 World Cup players to Germany, with the young team playing a series of matches against a variety of German teams, including their DFI counterparts.

During the same year, he partnered with Deutsche Fussball Internat (DFI), a German football academy. Bidyananda Singh of Bengaluru FC and Mohammad Sajid of Delhi Dynamos FC were the protégées of this partnership.

DFB – ICC (2016)

In 2016, Benny received the DFB – ICC Certificate from Hennef, Germany. He also took the prospective U-17 World Cup players to Germany once again for training and practice.

During the same year, Benny hosted a press conference in New Delhi at the French Embassy to formally announce the partnership among FC Metz, All India Football Federation (AIFF) and Eric Benny Sports Management to scout and groom young Indian talent. His protégées, Anirudh Thapa, Jerry Lalrinzuala, Baoringdao Bodo, Prosenjit Chakraborty and Bedaswor Singh were selected for a season’s training stint at the FC Metz football academy. Chennaiyin FC also signed all these players for a three-year contract. Jerry Lalrinzuala and Anirudh Thapa have played for the India National Football team.

EBFA (2017)

In 2017, Benny started to conduct scouting all over India to find the best talent for EBSM’s European programme. The same year, he started the Eric Benny Football Academy (EBFA) in Mumbai as a new way of coaching young, talented footballers (4–25 years’ age), using the expertise of UEFA-trained and certified coaches. Also, Anirudh and Jerry were among his star protegees to play for the ISL side, Chennaiyin FC.

EBFS (2018)

In 2018, Benny brought EBSM to Madhya Pradesh, with the aim of creating a footballing revolution in the state. He also established the Eric Benny Football School (EBFS) programme in Indore and Bhopal, an international residential football school of India. Benny, through his EBSM venture and in association with The Sports Gurukul (TSG) and DFI of Germany, launched the TSG Football School in Mumbai.

EBCF (2019)

In 2019, Benny announced that EBSM would start an I-League Second Division team based out of Madhya Pradesh. He also started the Eric Benny College Football (EBCF) to enable young footballers to pursue their sports and academic careers together.
