= Bani Bid =

Bani Bid باني بيد
- Village
- Location within Iran
- Coordinates: 34°33′36″N 46°18′28″E
- Country: Iran
- Province: Kermanshah
- County: Dalahu
- Bakhsh: Gahvareh
- Rural District: Qalkhani

Population (2006)
  - Total: 295
- Time zone: UTC+3:30 (IRST)
  - Summer (DST): UTC+4:30 (IRDT)

Bani Bid (Persian: باني بيد, also Romanized as Bānī Bīd; also known as Bān Bīd and Bānbīl) is a village in Qalkhani Rural District, Gahvareh District, Dalahu County, Kermanshah Province, Iran. At the 2006 census, its population was 295, in 65 families.
