= Bani Yadav =

Indian motorsports driver

Bani Mathur Yadav
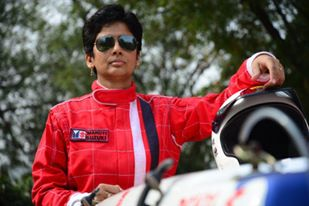
- Bani Mathur Yadav during the 2015 Asia-Pacific Rally Championship.

Personal information
- Nationality: (India) Indian
- Born: 7 September 1971 (age 55)

World Rally Championship record
- Years active: 2013–present
- Teams: Maruti Suzuki
- Championships: 2018 National Autocross Champion 2015 and 2016 Asia-Pacific Rally Championship, Indian Rally Championship Rally De North, Indian Rally Championship
- First rally: Maruti Suzuki 16th Raid De Himalayas
- Last win: XV Speed Sprint
- Last rally: Maruti Suzuki Desert Storm Rally 2017

Bani Mathur Yadav (born 7 September 1971) is an Indian rally driver, motorsports promoter and social rights supporter. Yadav was the only woman in India to win most of the major Cross Country Rally Titles in the national women's category.

== Early life and career ==
Bani Mathur Yadav was born in Lucknow and raised in Delhi and is a direct descendant of Lala KanjiMal Mathur, the Jagirdar of Madanpur in present-day Ferozabad district, Uttar Pradesh. The Mathur family constituted the erstwhile ruling and landed family of Madanpur.

Her paternal grandfather, Raghubir Sahai Mathur, was among the first Chief Engineers of the Municipal Corporation of the erstwhile United Provinces, later Uttar Pradesh. Her maternal grandfather, Hari Narayan Mathur, served as the first Transport Commissioner of the United Provinces following Indian independence.

Yadav was brought up in Delhi and attended Army Public School, Dhaula Kuan. She graduated in Geography from the University of Delhi and later obtained a diploma in Advertising and Public Relations. Her interest in automobiles began at an early age, and she first drove a vehicle at the age of thirteen. She later married her high school friend, Suresh Yadav.Her first experience with racing was at age 13, inspiring her to compete for the first time in the 2013 Jaipur Speed Sprint at the age of 43. She finished at second place.

Yadav was the fastest woman driver in the 2015 Asia-Pacific Rally Championship. Yadav participates in events for women's empowerment, endorsing equal rights and gender equality.

Bani was the National Autocross Champion-Woman in 2018 and 2019. She is the first woman from India to drive Formula 4 cars outside of India at the Abu Dhabi Yas Marina Circuit. She is the only woman in India to have been awarded a doctorate in motorsports.

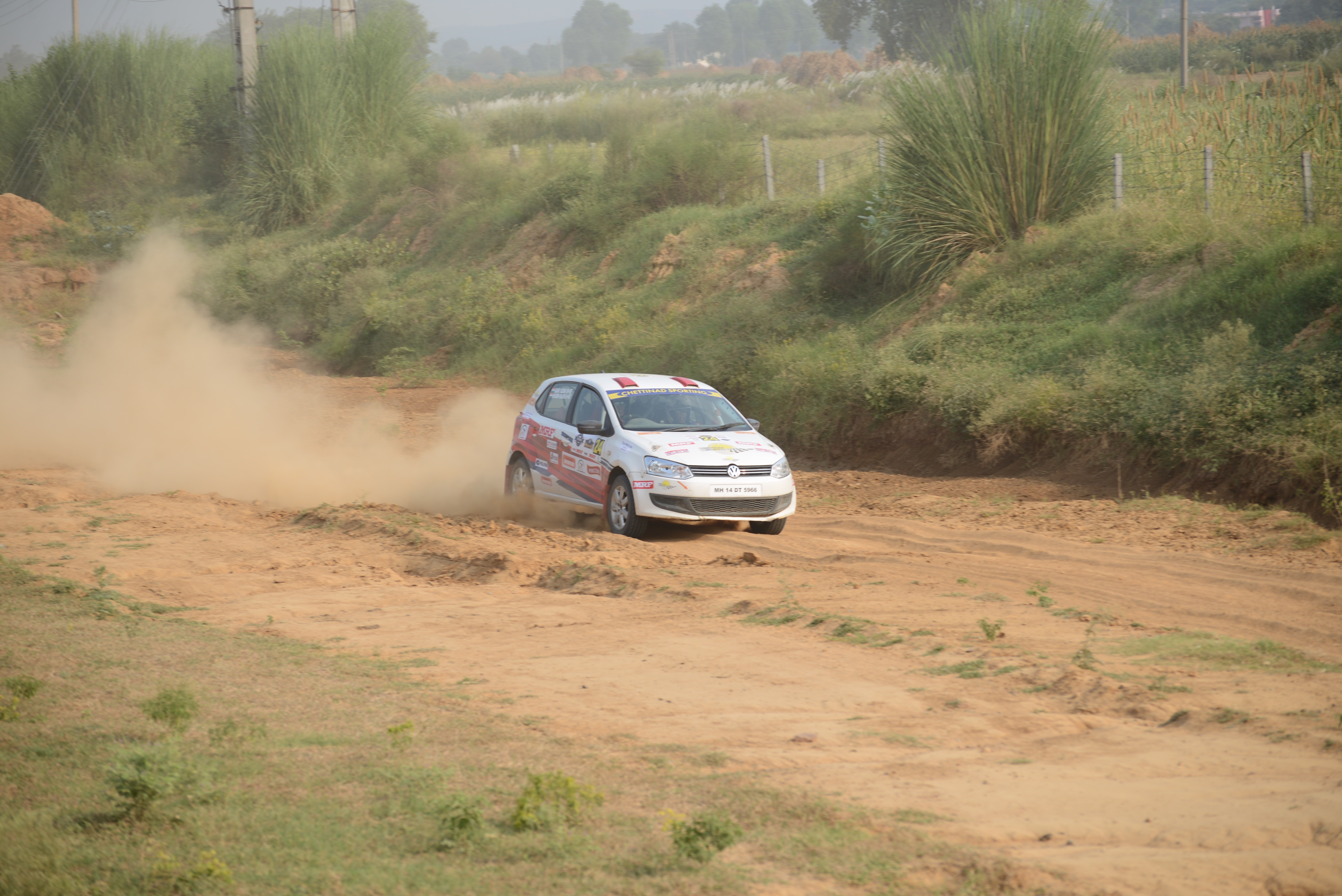
A photo of Yadav's vehicle during a race.

Yadav sustained a spine injury in October 2013. Her recovery involved two back surgeries and took six months. She returned to racing afterwards.

== Personal life ==
Yadav is married to her friend Suresh and has two sons, who are also rally drivers.

== Career results ==
| Year | Date | Races | Position | Category | Place | Ref |
|---|---|---|---|---|---|---|
| 2014 | 2 to 10 October | Maruti Suzuki 16th Raid De Himalayas | 1st | Women | | |
| 2014 | 14 to 16 November | Maruti Suzuki Autocross 2014 | 1st | Women | Chandigarh | |
| 2014 | 14 to 16 November | Pro Mode Dsl Maruti | 1st | Men & Women | Chandigarh | |
| 2014 | 14 to 16 November | Pro Stock 4x4 | 2nd | Men & Women | Chandigarh | |
| 2014 | 14 to 16 November | Pro Mode Dsl Open | 3rd | Men & Women | Chandigarh | |
| 2014 | 14 to 16 November | The Solo Challenge | 1st | Women | Chandigarh | |
| 2014 | 28 to 30 November | The Ultimate Desert Challenge | 29th | Men & Women | Bikaner, Rajasthan | |
| 2014 | 13 to 14 December | 10th Speed Sprint | | Men & Women | Manesar, Gurgaon | |
| 2014 | 13 to 14 December | Modified 4x4, over 2000 CC | 1st | Men & Women | Manesar, Gurgaon | |
| 2014 | 13 to 14 December | Unmodified 4x4, over 2000 CC | 1st | Men & Women | Manesar, Gurgaon | |
| 2014 | 13 to 14 December | Unmodified, up to 2000 CC | 1st | Men & Women | Manesar, Gurgaon | |
| 2014 | 13 to 14 December | Unmodified, over 2000 CC | 1st | Men & Women | Manesar, Gurgaon | |
| 2014 | 13 to 14 December | Unmodified Diesel Open | 2nd | Men & Women | Manesar, Gurgaon | |
| 2014 | 13 to 14 December | Modified Diesel Open | 3rd | Men & Women | Manesar, Gurgaon | |
| 2014 | 13 to 14 December | Modified Diesel, any CC | 1st | Men & Women | Manesar, Gurgaon | |
| 2014 | 13 to 14 December | Unmodified Diesel, any CC | 1st | Men & Women | Manesar, Gurgaon | |
| 2014 | 20 to 21 December | 6th OYA Autocars & Motocross Cum OFF Roading Challenge | | Men & Women | Chandigarh | |
| 2014 | 20 to 21 December | SUV Open | 2nd | Men & Women | Chandigarh | |
| 2014 | 20 to 21 December | Diesel Open | 2nd | Men & Women | Chandigarh | |
| 2014 | 20 to 21 December | Woman's | 1st | Women | Chandigarh | |
| 2015 | 9 to 11 January | Royal Rajasthan Rally | 1st | Women | Jaipur | |
| 2015 | 22 February to 1 March | Maruti Suzuki Desert Storm Rally | 1st | Women | | |
| 2015 | 22 February to 1 March | Maruti Suzuki Desert Storm Rally | 16th | Men & Women | | |
| 2015 | 15 June | Maruti Suzuki Dakshin Dare Rally | 1st | Women | Uttarakhand | |
| 2015 | August | Rally Cross Jaipur | 1st | Men & Women | Uttarakhand | |
| 2015 | August | Diesel Category | 1st | Men & Women | Uttarakhand | |
| 2015 | August | Amateur Category | 3rd | Men & Women | Uttarakhand | |
| 2015 | 15 November | XIV Speed Sprint | 1st | Women | Faridabad | |
| 2015 | 18 to 20 December | Auto Cross | 1st | Women | | |
| 2016 | | Dakshin Dare Rally | 2nd | Men & Women | | |
| 2016 | | Uttrakhand Rally | 3rd | Men & Women | Uttarakhand | |
| 2016 | | Rally De North - Indian Rally Championship Round | 2nd | Men & Women | | |
| 2017 | | Maruti Suzuki Desert Storm Rally | 1st | Women | Rajasthan | |
| | | Maruti Suzuki National Autocross Championship | 1st | Women | Delhi | |
| 2018 | | Indian National Autocross Championship | 1st 3rd | Women, above 1650cc | North Zone | |
| 2019 | | Indian National Autocross Championship | 1st | Women | Mumbai | |

== Achievements ==
National Autocross Champion India 2018 | 2019 - Ladies

1st woman to win second position in Rally De North part of Indian Rally

1st woman to have won – The Asia pacific rally Cup of Coffee Day Rally - Indian Rally championship women's category in 2015.

1st in Class 2000cc - The Asia pacific rally cup of Coffee Day Rally - Indian Rally championship.

4th in ASIA Pacific Rally Cup rally.

3rd 1650cc category in the Maruti Suzuki National Autocross championship 2016

1st woman from India to officially drive formula 4 car outside of India at the Abu Dhabi Yas Marina Circuit and tested the PS 4 sports tyres for Michelin.

Only Indian Woman to be awarded with an International Doctorate in MotorSports in India (Management by the CommonWealth Vocational University of Tonga)

Awarded the Haryana State Government " Best Sportsperson Award for 2017 -18

Awarded "The TOPMOST Woman Rallyist OF The Year" Award for 2016 -17 (International Association of Educators for World Peace - Affiliated to United Nations)

Awarded The Outstanding Woman in Motorsports for Rallying for 2016, by FMSCI.

Awarded the Nirbhaya Jyoti National Woman Achiever Award 2018

Awarded the Main Hoon Beti Award 2018 by the Uttar Pradesh administration

Facilitated By the Ambassador of Argentine Republic His Excellency Mr Daniel Chuburu for contribution towards Motorsports

Awarded by the Confederation of Indian Industries the CII – IWN Woman Achiever Award 2017.

Felicitated by The Ramraj Environment for outstanding contribution towards women Empowerment on Good Governance Day

Awarded the Top Woman Achiever Award by Bharti Airtel Ltd. in 2017.

Awarded with the Woman's Achievers Award by Amity University for the Year 2016.

Recognised as One of the Top 4 Woman Achievers on the eve of 70th year of India's Independence by Doordarshan in 2017.
