= George Geary Bennis =

- Born: 1790; Limerick, Ireland
- Died: 1866 (aged 75–76); Paris, France
- Occupations: writer librarian

George Geary Bennis (1790–1866) was a writer, originally from Limerick in Ireland. At different times Bennis also worked as a grocer, a librarian and a newspaper editor. In retrospect, however, he is chiefly remembered as a prodigious book collector who bequeathed enough volumes to his native city of Limerick to form the basis of a library "for the free use of the citizens", although it would only be in 1893 that the first public library in Limerick was actually opened.

== Life ==
Bennis was born in Corkamore (Clarina), County Limerick, in the southern part of Ireland. He was probably born in 1790, although there are also sources giving his birth year as 1793. His first work was as a grocer, but while still a young man he relocated to Liverpool in mainland Britain where, it is thought, he joined the Quakers.

In 1816 he published "The Principles of the one Faith Professed by All Christians", which would be reprinted in Paris 1826. Bennis then moved to London, possibly also returning subsequently to work in Limerick, before in 1823 crossing The Channel and settling in Paris. Various further literary works followed including "Traveller's Pocket Diary and Student's Journal" and a "Treatise on Life Assurance". He is believed to have undertaken further travel, but between 1830 and 1836 he was employed in Paris as the director of a "Foreigners' Library" (" librairie des étrangers") established in the city by the pioneering editor Martin Bossange and the industrialist-politician Antoine-Augustin Renouard.

During his Paris years Bennis also took work as an insurance agent, and was at one stage employed as a librarian by the British Embassy. Meanwhile, his membership of the Religious Society of Friends (Quakers) lapsed, although he continued to espouse Quaker principals. He also edited "Galignani", a news journal described in several sources as "The Times of Paris". In 1854 he was honoured with the Legion of Honour, although at a detailed level sources differ over why. One version is that he saved the life of King Louis Philippe when the king was subject to an assassination attempt, while another is content to record merely that in 1848 he saved the king's life "during a street fracas". The statement that, "at the time of the [1848] revolution, he peacefully retook the royal flag, for which he was knighted by the king," may or may not be an alternative reading of the same events.

He was still living in Paris at the time of the coup d'état of 1851, and lost a large amount of property in the disturbances that briefly ensued. A few years later it is reported that he came close to being burned to death when fire engulfed government bakeries at the time of the Crimean War. The incident also involved the destruction of many of his books.

George Geary Bennis died in Paris in January 1866 and was buried in the city. Sources now focus on his will and estate. His nephew and executor, Edward Bennis, arrived from Lancashire in England shortly after his death, to find that his uncle's coin collection had already been stolen. Nevertheless, what remained was more than 10,000 books, and these in due course formed a substantial kernel for a public library in Limerick.
