= Bene AG =

Austrian furniture company

- Company type: Public
- Traded as: WBAG: BENE
- Industry: Office furniture
- Founded: 1790; 236 years ago
- Headquarters: Waidhofen an der Ybbs, Lower Austria, Austria
- Key people: Frank Wiegmann (CEO)
- Number of employees: 1,295
- Website: http://www.bene.com

Bene AG is a publicly listed Austrian office furniture manufacturer and service provider. In the 2022 business year, the company reported a turnover of €176 million.

The company develops and manufactures office furniture and offers related sales and consulting services. Its products and services are available through a network of 82 sales locations in 32 countries. Bene Consulting, a subsidiary of the group, provides advisory services and manages office projects from offices in Waidhofen an der Ybbs, Vienna, and Frankfurt. Another subsidiary, Bene Solutions, is responsible for furniture design and production.

== History ==
Bene was founded in 1790 and began industrial-scale office furniture production in 1951. During the 1980s, the company expanded internationally, establishing offices in London and Moscow. In 1989, production was relocated from Zell an der Ybbs to the current headquarters in Waidhofen an der Ybbs, designed by architect Laurids Ortner.

From 1995 to 1998, Bene extended its presence across Central and Eastern Europe, opening locations in the Czech Republic, Hungary, Poland, Romania, Slovakia, and Slovenia. In 1998, it entered the German market by acquiring Objektform. Between 2000 and 2003, the company expanded into Western Europe, opening outlets in the Benelux region and France. The Waidhofen production site also grew from 9,000 m^{2} to 40,000 m^{2}, with an investment of approximately €22 million.

In 2003, Bene entered a joint venture in Poland (Bene Nowy Styl S.A.) and opened a branch in Dubai to serve the Middle Eastern market. In 2004, the company partnered with Japanese office furniture firm KOKUYO Co., Ltd. to expand into Asia. Sales also began in Croatia and Serbia.

In August 2004, a financial syndicate led by Unternehmens Invest AG (UIAG) became a stakeholder. Bene received ISO 9001 and ISO 14001 certifications in 2006, and transitioned into a joint-stock company (AG). Its initial public offering (IPO) on the Vienna Stock Exchange marked UIAG's exit. That year, the company also entered the markets of Bulgaria, Ukraine, Spain, Ireland, and Kuwait. In November 2006, it acquired the German TILL Group, formerly a distribution partner. In April 2007, it expanded further by acquiring a distribution partner in Belgium.

== Financial information (2008/09) ==
Metric	Value
Group sales (2008/09)	€265.3 million
EBITDA (2008/09)	€11.4 million
Export share	72%
Employees (as of October 2009)	1,295
Sales points	82 in 32 countries Source
