= Elisa Beni =

Spanish journalist (born 1964)

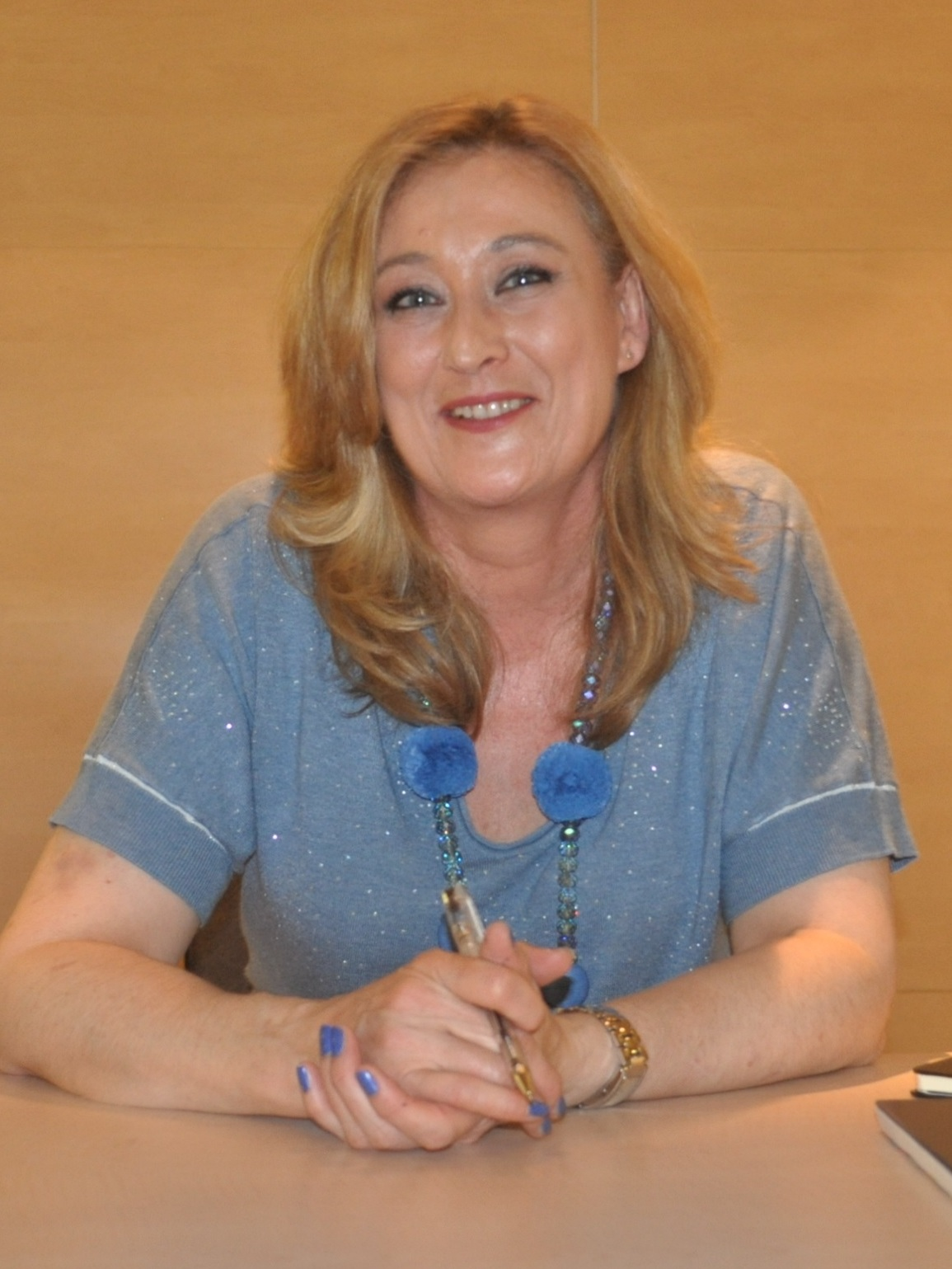
- Born: Elisa Beni Uzabal; 31 July 1964 (age 62); Logroño, Spain
- Education: University of Navarra
- Occupations: Journalist, writer
- Spouse: Javier Gómez Bermúdez (2001–2014)

Elisa Beni Uzabal (born 31 July 1964) is a Spanish journalist. When she took over El Faro de Ceuta at 23, she became the youngest newspaper director in Spain.

== Biography ==
Elisa Beni graduated in Information Sciences from the University of Navarra. She has worked at La Voz de Almería, La Razón, Época magazine, and was editor-in-chief of the now-defunct newspaper Diario 16. She has been director of Cadena SER stations and is a regular contributor to Julia Otero's program on Onda Cero, Julia en la onda, as well as television programs such as Las mañanas de Cuatro, Al rojo vivo, Más vale tarde, laSexta Noche (on laSexta), and Madrid al Día (on Telemadrid).

In 2001 she married for the second time, to judge Javier Gómez Bermúdez, magistrate of the Audiencia Nacional. They divorced in April 2014.

In 2004 she was appointed communication director of the Superior Court of Justice of Madrid, a position from which she was dismissed in 2008 "for loss of confidence" following the publication, in November 2007, of the book La soledad del juzgador, about how her husband, the investigating judge of the 11-M case, had dealt with the judicial process.

In June 2014 she published a novel, Peaje de libertad.

== Selected publications ==
- Levantando el velo. Manual de periodismo judicial (2006) CIE Inversiones Editoriales Dossat-2000, S.L., ISBN 9788496437395 – with Javier Gómez Bermúdez
- La soledad del juzgador (2007) Editorial Planeta, ISBN 9788484606833
- Peaje de libertad (2014) Espasa, ISBN 9788467042016
- La Justicia sometida (2015) Los Libros de la Catarata, ISBN 9788490970249
- Pisa mi corazón (2017) Editorial Almuzara, ISBN 9788417044435
