= Eliza Bennis =

Methodist leader (1725-1802)

- Born: Elizabeth Patten; 1725; Limerick
- Died: June 1802 (aged 76–77); Philadelphia
- Known for: early Methodist
- Spouse: Mitchell Bennis

Elizabeth Bennis (1725 – June 1802) was an Irish Methodist leader. She was born in Limerick and died in Philadelphia.

== Life ==
Bennis was born in Limerick in 1725 to Isaac and Alice Patten. Her father died when she was eighteen. When she was twenty, she married Mitchell Bennis, a master saddler.

In 1749 she was inspired by hearing Robert Swindells preach in Limerick; Swindells had arrived in Ireland with John Wesley the previous year. She became the first Methodist convert in Limerick, and subsequently a leading Methodist in the area, looking after Methodist classes and band meetings and becoming the church's leader. Women were allowed to preach in the early Methodist church, but Bennis asked the church leaders to send a preacher to Limerick. This was said to be the first time that the Methodists responded to such a demand.

In 1768 she focused her attention on Waterford, where she established a Methodist group. She corresponded with Wesley, who acknowledged her success. In 1770 he asked her to return to Limerick where the group had become disorganised.

In 1779 her husband was involved in the creation of the Limerick corps of Irish Volunteers.

Her husband died in 1788 at the end of a happy marriage which resulted in four children.

Bennis died in 1802 in Philadelphia.

== Legacy ==
Her son published her letters posthumously in 1809.

In the Smithsonian Institution there is an embroidery by Bennis.

In 2014 it was announced that the Asbury Theological Seminary had acquired documentation relating to Bennis.
