= Bani, Central African Republic =

Village in Haute-Kotto, Central African Republic

Bani
- Location in Central African Republic
- Coordinates: 7°7′43″N 22°49′34″E
- Country: Central African Republic
- Prefecture: Haute-Kotto
- Sub-prefecture: Yalinga
- Commune: Yalinga

Bani is a village situated in Haute-Kotto Prefecture, Central African Republic.

== History ==
Together with Nzacko, LRA attacked Bani in August 2009 and abducted 45 civilians in both villages. LRA stormed Bani on 23 December 2012 and looted food. They killed three and abducted 12 people. Due to the village's isolation, the news had only spread on 14 January 2013.

UPDF forces stationed in Bani on 28 August 2014 to pursue LRA and the locals welcomed the presence of them in their village.

== Healthcare ==
There is one health center in the village.
