= Bani, Gambia =

Bani
- Location in the Gambia
- Coordinates: 13°22′N 13°52′W
- Country: Gambia
- Division: Upper River Division
- District: Kantora

Population (2008)
  - Total: 1,177

Bani is a town in far eastern Gambia. It is located in Kantora District in the Upper River Division. As of 2008, it has an estimated population of 1,177.
