= Beni Takemata =

Japanese announcer and former shogi player

- 竹俣紅
- Takemata in 2013
- Born: June 27, 1998 (age 27)
- Occupations: Women's professional shogi player (former); Tarento (former); Fuji TV announcer (current)

Beni Takemata (竹俣 紅, Takemata Beni; born June 27, 1998) is a female announcer for Fuji TV. She is a former Japanese women's professional shogi player who was ranked 1-dan.

== Women's shogi professional ==
In December 2018, Takemata announced her intention to retire from professional shogi and leave the Japan Shogi Association at the end of March 2019 to pursue other opportunities as well as to focus on her studies.

=== Promotion history ===
Takemata's promotion history was as follows:

- 2012, October 1: 2-kyū
- 2015, July 1: 1-kyū
- 2016, April 1: 1-dan

Note: All ranks are women's professional ranks.

== Media personality ==
She was managed by Watanabe Entertainment as one of their "Intellectual Tarentos", appearing on Japanese variety shows and making personal appearances.

In April 2021, she joined Fuji Television as announcer.

=== Filmography ===
==== Television ====
- Live News it! (July 2021 – present ) - Field caster
- Banjō no Alpha (NHK BS Premium, February 2019) - as Hina Kurahashi II

== Personal life ==
Takemata studied political science and economics at Waseda University. She graduated from the university in March 2021.
