= City of Brighton (South Australia) =

City of Brighton South Australia
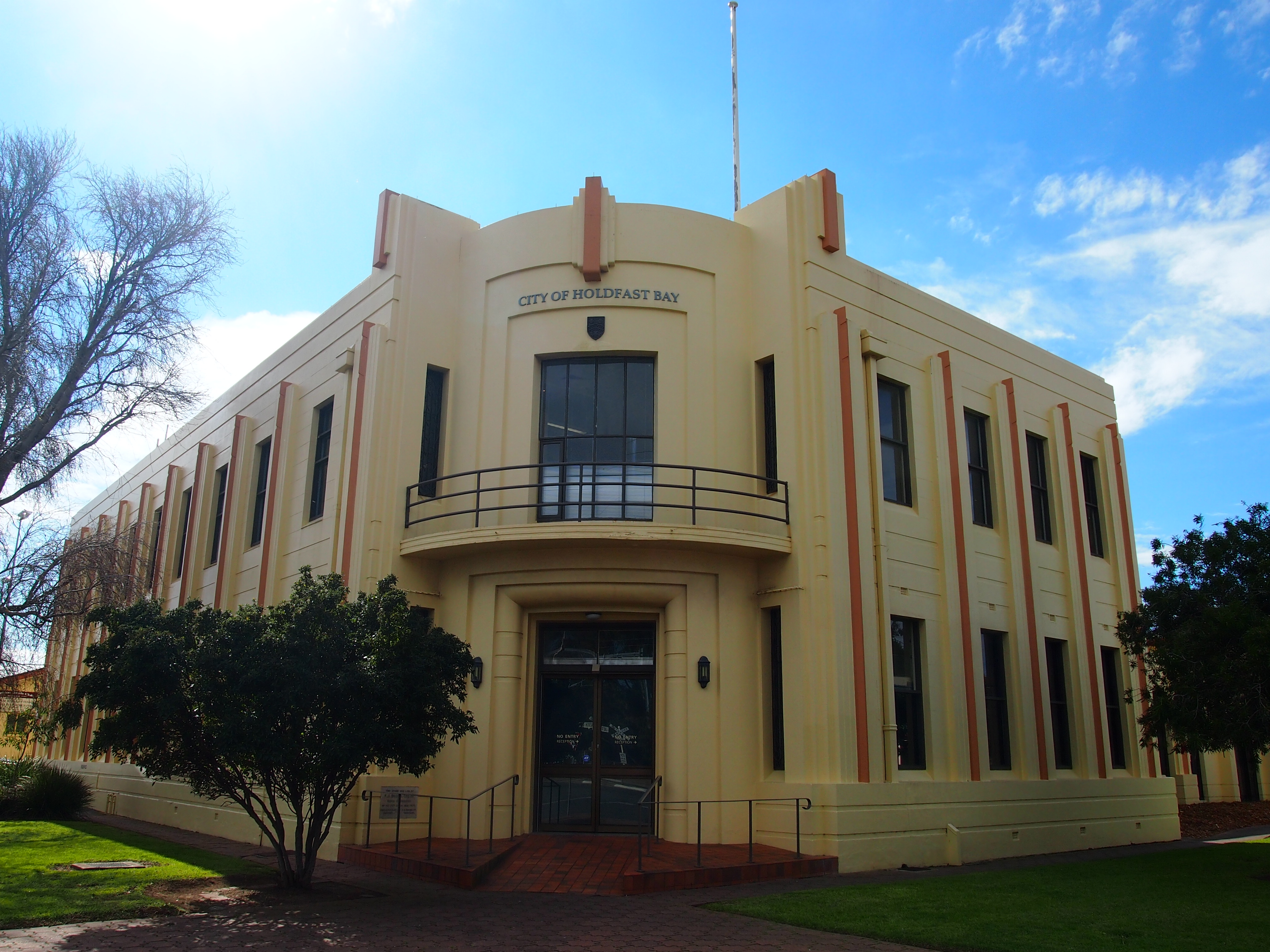
- Brighton municipal building, formerly the Brighton Town Hall, housed the council chambers from 1937 to 1997.

- Coordinates: 35.019°S 138.520°E
- Established: 1858
- Abolished: 1997
- Council seat: Brighton
LGAs around City of Brighton:
Glenelg	Marion
City of Brighton	Marion
Marion	Marion

The City of Brighton was a local government area in South Australia seated at the Adelaide sea-side township of Brighton from 1858 until 1997. The City of Brighton played a significant role in Adelaide's coastal development before its eventual amalgamation with the City of Holdfast Bay in 1997 as part of statewide local government reforms.

== History ==
The Corporate Town of Brighton was proclaimed on 25 November 1858 by severance from the District Council of Brighton, the latter later changing its name to Marion to avoid confusion. The town boundaries extended from the modern Yarrum Grove, Boundary Road and Oaklands Road (Somerton Park), in the north, to Kingston Park reserve, Kingston House, Scholfield Road (Kingston Park) and Arthur Street (Seacliff Park) in the south. On the west it was bounded by the coastline and on the east by the modern Brighton Road (Somerton Park), MacArthur Avenue (Hove), Winton Avenue (Hove), Neath Avenue (South Brighton) and Davenport Terrace (Seacliff Park). The inaugural councillors named in the 1858 proclamation were: Francis Corbet Singleton, Pitt Cobbett, George William Chinner, William Home Popham, and William Voules Brown.

The municipality of Brighton ultimately became the City of Brighton when it crossed the required population threshold in the early 1900s.

Brighton and its northern coastal neighbour, the City of Glenelg, were amalgamated in 1997 to become the City of Holdfast Bay, which retained the two civic centres at Brighton and Glenelg.

== Councillors ==
In 1919 Grace Benny was elected to Brighton council, becoming the first woman to be elected as a councillor in a local government body in South Australia.
