= Al-Bani =

Al-Bani الباني
- Village
- Location in Syria
- Coordinates: 35°24′29″N 36°27′37″E
- Country: Syria
- Governorate: Hama
- District: Suqaylabiyah
- Subdistrict: Qalaat al-Madiq

Population (2004)
  - Total: 1,328
- Time zone: UTC+3 (AST)
- City Qrya Pcode: N/A

Al-Bani (Arabic: الباني) is a village in northern Syria located in the Qalaat al-Madiq Subdistrict of the al-Suqaylabiyah District in Hama Governorate. According to the Syria Central Bureau of Statistics (CBS), al-Bani had a population of 1,328 in the 2004 census. Its inhabitants are predominantly Sunni Muslims.
