= Benni Bødker =

Danish writer (born 1975)

Benni Bødker (born 1975) is a Danish writer. He holds a Master's Degree in Danish Literature and Philosophy and works as a publishing editor and teaches creative writing. He has published the novels Helvedesmaskinen (2004, The Infernal Machine) and Besættelse (2005, Occupation) for young adults and the children's vampire series Nattens Børn (2006, Children of the Night) along with several easy reading titles. His books in English include Halloween (2004) and The Ghost Rider (2005).
