= Vorobyovka, Voronezh Oblast =

Rural locality in Voronezh Oblast, Russia

Coordinates: 50°38′39″N 40°56′06″E

Vorobyovka (Russian: Воробьёвка) is a rural locality (a selo) and the administrative center of Vorobyovsky District of Voronezh Oblast, Russia. Population: 3,662 (2021 census); 4,103 (2010 census); 4,482 (2002 census); 5,702 (1989 Soviet census).
