= Vorobyovsky District =

Vorobyovsky District Воробьёвский район (Russian)
- District
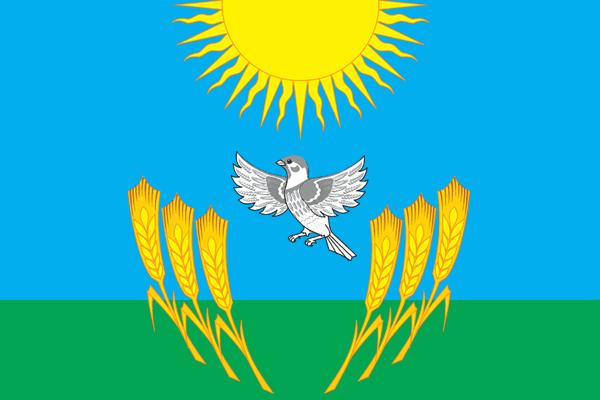
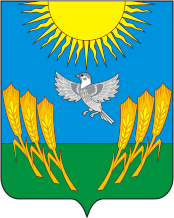
- Flag Coat of arms
- Location of Vorobyovsky District in Voronezh Oblast
- Coordinates: 50°39′N 40°57′E
- Country: Russia
- Federal subject: Voronezh Oblast
- Established: 1928
- Administrative center: Vorobyovka

Area
  - Total: 1,236 km^{2} (477 sq mi)

Population (2010 Census)
  - Total: 18,933
  - Density: 15.32/km^{2} (39.67/sq mi)
  - Urban: 0%
  - Rural: 100%

Administrative structure
  - Administrative divisions: 4 Rural settlements
  - Inhabited localities: 29 rural localities

Municipal structure
  - Municipally incorporated as: Vorobyovsky Municipal District
  - Municipal divisions: 0 urban settlements, 4 rural settlements
- Time zone: UTC+3 (MSK)
- OKTMO ID: 20612000
- Website: http://www.vorob-rn.ru

Vorobyovsky District (Russian: Воробьёвский райо́н) is an administrative and municipal district (raion), one of the thirty-two in Voronezh Oblast, Russia. It is located in the east of the oblast. The area of the district is 1,236 square kilometers (477 sq mi). Its administrative center is the rural locality (a selo) of Vorobyovka. Population: 15,290 (2021 Census); 18,933 (2010 Census); 21,759 (2002 Census); 24,065 (1989 Soviet census). The population of Vorobyovka accounts for 24.0% of the district's total population.
