= Battle of Falagountou =

2023 battle in Burkina Faso

- Part of Jihadist insurgency in Burkina Faso
Date	January 28, 2023
Location	Falagountou, Burkina Faso
Result	Indecisive

Belligerents
Burkina Faso: VDP auxiliaries	Islamic State: Sahel Province

Casualties and losses
10 soldiers killed 2 VDP killed 5 injured 10 missing	15 killed
- 1 civilian killed

On January 28, 2023, suspected Islamic State jihadists attacked Burkinabe soldiers and Volunteers for the Defense of the Homeland (VDP) militiamen in the city of Falagountou, Burkina Faso.

== Background ==
The Burkinabe government has been fighting a jihadist insurgency in northern Burkina Faso since 2015, when Ansarul Islam militants captured swathes of territory along the Burkinabe-Malian border. This escalated in 2017, when Malian jihadist group Jama'at Nasr al-Islam wal Muslimin allied with Ansarul Islam, and began fighting in Burkina Faso as well. In January 2022, Paul-Henri Sandaogo Damiba overthrew President Roch Kaboré due to the latter's inefficiency in fighting the jihadists. Damiba himself was overthrown that September by Ibrahim Traoré, who ramped up conscription of VDPs, pro-government militiamen. Traore has used VDPs as cannon fodder, with loose training that has seen many casualties.

On January 11, 2023, unknown jihadists attacked several VDP posts near Goulgountou before killing several civilians at the town's mosque. Burkinabe forces announced counter-terrorist operations in the area, which included most of Falagountou Department, following the attack. This counteroffensive recaptured most of Falagountou Department. The Islamic State – Sahil Province (ISGS) is active in the Falagountou area.

== Battle ==
Jihadists attacked the VDP base in Falagountou on January 28, in preparation for an attack on the village on January 30. Clashes broke out between the jihadists and the VDP, along with the Burkinabe Army. The Burkinabe government stated that twelve people were killed in the attack, including ten soldiers and two VDP. One civilian was killed in the crossfire. The press release also stated that ten soldiers were still missing and five were injured. The Burkinabe government also claimed the deaths of fifteen jihadists.

== Aftermath ==
No group claimed responsibility for the attack on Falagountou, although Burkinabe journalists suspected the Islamic State due to its presence nearby. On February 15, a Burkinabe army counteroffensive in the department arrested sixteen men in Ekeou village, and two more in Goulgountou, before summarily executing at least ten of them at the VDP base in Falagountou.
