= Seytenga massacre =

Massacre in Burkina Faso

- Part of the Islamist insurgency in Burkina Faso
- Seytenga massacre (Burkina Faso)
- Location: 13°58′23″N 0°18′12″E; Seytenga, Séno Province, Burkina Faso
- Date: 11-12 June 2022; 15:30–5:00 (GMT, UTC±00:00)
- Attack type: Mass shooting, massacre, arson
- Deaths: 86 (per Burkinabe government); 165+ (per survivors)
- Injuries: Unknown
- Perpetrator: Islamic State in the Greater Sahara
- Motive: Pro-government populace and presence of VDP

On 11 June 2022, jihadists from the Islamic State in the Greater Sahara attacked the town of Seytenga, Séno Province, Burkina Faso, killing over a hundred civilians in a massacre. The massacre occurred after Burkinabe forces evacuated the city following ISGS' takeover of the Burkinabe base in the town on 9 June.

== Background ==
Since 2015, Burkina Faso has been embroiled in an insurgency by the Mali-based Jama'at Nasr al-Islam wal-Muslimin, the Niger-based Islamic State in the Greater Sahara (ISGS), and the homegrown Burkinabe Ansarul Islam. These insurgent groups began besieging government-controlled towns starting with Arbinda in 2019, and by early 2022 dozens of towns, including provincial capitals, were under siege by JNIM and Ansarul Islam. Sieges became the modus operandi of these groups beginning in 2022, and jihadists often attacked civilians fleeing the areas while also preventing supplies and food from going in and out.

Seytenga, a city of 31,000 prior to the massacre, is located near the Nigerien border. Civilians in the town are known to be supportive of the Burkinabe government and the pro-government Volunteers for the Defense of the Homeland (VDP). In May 2022, the Islamic State in the Greater Sahara (ISGS) began an offensive in the Menaka region of Mali, bordering northern Burkina Faso.

== VDP base attack ==
The first attack by ISGS on Seytenga began on 8 June, when a small-scale incursion of about twenty fighters entered the outskirts of the town to test the responsiveness of the VDP militiamen and Burkinabe soldiers located in the town. The incursion began at 5pm that day, with the ISGS fighters stealing hundreds of heads of cattle. Three people were killed and two were wounded in the incursion.

The next day, 9 June, a larger group of about 100 ISGS fighters entered Seytenga to target the VDP base in the area due to a meager response from VDP the day prior. At 6pm, ISGS fighters launched mortar shells at the base followed by assaults from all sides. The base was heavily damaged in the attack, and was rendered unusable. The Burkinabe junta did not mention whether the base had fallen under jihadist control, although VDP and Burkinabe forces abandoned the base on June 10 and withdrew to Dori. Some reinforcements from the Burkinabe army had arrived in Seytenga between June 9 and 10, but left soon after with the VDP as ISGS fighters began targeting soldiers' homes. The attack on June 9 killed eleven gendarmes and injured twenty others.

== Massacre ==
On 11 June, Burkinabe forces and civilians prepared to evacuate Seytenga before the town came under ISGS control. The village was encircled by ISGS early in the morning of 11 June, and civilians were prohibited from leaving.

At 3:30pm on 11 June, ISGS fighters began entering the streets of Seytenga and shot indiscriminately at civilians. The jihadists went house to house, starting on the busiest street in the town where cafes and shops are located. Everyone was shot at except women, and when the jihadists entered a building they asked where the men were.

A survivor of the attack told Amnesty International that the attackers spoke on walkie-talkies and stole items and money from civilians. At least 300 jihadists on 200 motorcycles participated in the massacre. Other survivors added that the jihadists shot at people trying to run away, including children. The massacre lasted from 3:30pm to 5am on June 12, with the jihadists returning at 9pm to steal cattle and more belongings. Many homes were burnt, the hospital, pharmacy, and many shops were also torched and looted.

Civilians fled during the dead of night to escape the massacre. By 13 June, 34,000 civilians had fled to Dori and 360 had fled across the border to Niger. ISGS fighters shot at men attempting to flee, chasing them into rural areas.

== Aftermath ==
Initial death tolls from the Burkinabe government stated that fifty people were killed in the massacre, although a lack of a Burkinabe government presence in the area made counting the death toll difficult. The toll increased to 79 by June 14, and 86 by June 15.

Civilians fleeing Seytenga stated that bodies were strewn about the streets in the days after the attack. Some sources stated that at least 100 civilians had been killed in the massacre. Unverified reports of up to 170 or 200 killed spread on Burkinabe social media. The Seytenga massacre was the deadliest attack since the Solhan and Tadaryat massacres in June 2021, just over a year prior.

The Islamic State in the Greater Sahara claimed responsibility for the attack in an audio recording on July 14. In the audio, an ISGS commander justified the attack by the presence of a VDP base in the town and heavy government support among the civilian populace, and the commander threatened other areas where VDPs were present with reprisal attacks. Wassim Nasr, a journalist and expert on the jihadist insurgency in the Sahel, stated that the attack was carried out by recent defectors to ISGS from Jama'at Nasr al-Islam wal-Muslimin.
