= Goulgountou mosque attack =

2023 mass murder in Burkina Faso

- Part of Jihadist insurgency in Burkina Faso
- Location: Goulgountou, Burkina Faso
- Date: January 11, 2023
- Deaths: 9
- Perpetrator: Unknown
- Motive: Jihadism

On January 11, 2023, unknown jihadists killed nine civilians at a mosque in Goulgountou, Burkina Faso.

== Background ==
Sahel Region, where Goulgountou is located, has been the heart of the jihadist insurgency in Burkina Faso that began in 2015 and intensified in 2019. The two main jihadist groups in the region are Jama'at Nasr al-Islam wal Muslimin (JNIM) and Ansarul Islam. Around the time of the attacks in Goulgountou, JNIM kidnapped dozens of women and children in Arbinda.

== Attacks ==
In the afternoon of January 11, jihadists attacked Volunteers for the Defense of the Homeland troops stationed at mines in Debere and Korizena, near Goulgountou, killing at least two. The attackers then went towards Goulgountou, arriving on eight motorcycles, and proceeding to intimidate worshippers inside a mosque in the neighborhood of Ticknawell. The jihadists pressured the worshippers to convert to the jihadists' sect of Islam. When the local imam argued back, the jihadists threatened to slit his throat. The imam stated he would only die standing, so he was shot. Eight other worshippers were killed in similar ways.

== Aftermath ==
Following the attack, Goulgountou residents fled the town. The Burkinabe announced counter-terrorism operations in the area shortly following the attack.
