= Dori Department =

Coordinates: 14.0330°N 0.0330°W

Dori
- Department
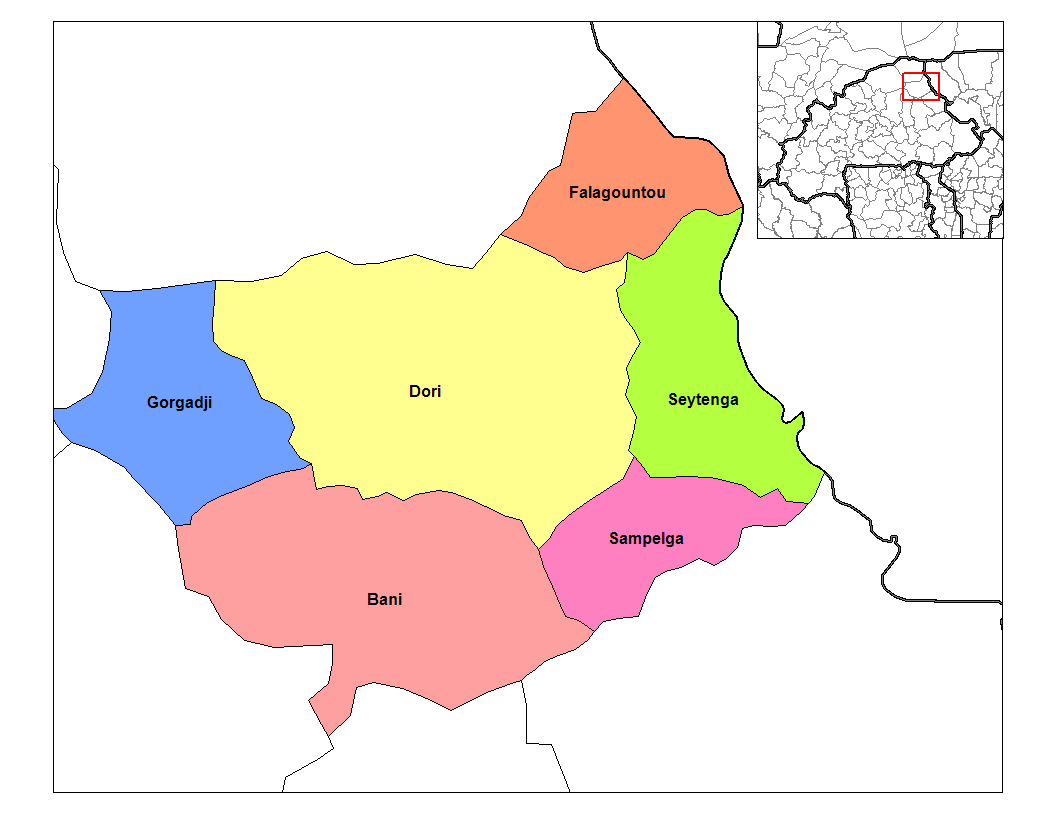
- Dori Department location in the province
- Country: Burkina Faso
- Province: Séno Province

Area
  - Department: 960 sq mi (2,486 km^{2})

Population (2019 census)
  - Department: 180,512
  - Density: 188.1/sq mi (72.61/km^{2})
  - Urban: 46,512
- Time zone: UTC+0 (GMT 0)

Dori is a department or commune of Séno Province in northern Burkina Faso. Its capital is the town of Dori.

== Towns and villages ==
- Baaga
- Bafelé
- Balandagou
- Bambofa
- Bargare
- Beguentigui
- Bellare Djamalel
- Bellare Maga
- Beybaye
- Binguel
- Billy
- Boudounguel
- Bouloye
- Bouloye Thiouly
- Boundou Woundoudou
- Boureye
- Boureye Iongondjou
- Dani
- Dangade
- Dantchadi
- Debere Talata
- Demni
- Djigo
- Fetombaga
- Fetombale
- Foulgou
- Gassel Biankou
- Goudoubo
- Gotogou
- Guidé
- Hogga
- Hoggo Samboel
- Kabieka
- Kampiti
- Katchirga
- Katchari
- Kodiolaye
- Koria
- Kouri
- Kiryollo Ouro Arsaba
- Lerbou
- Lere Ibaye
- Malbo
- Mallere
- M'bamga
- Mamassiol
- Nakou
- N'diolloa
- Nelba
- Nobiol
- Oulo
- Ourfou
- Ouro Baagabe
- Ouro Longa
- Ouro Torobe
- Padala
- Pempendiangou
- Peoukoye
- Petakolle
- Sambonaye
- Selbo
- Soumkoum
- Sourtatibe Touka
- Taaka
- Tigou
- Thioumbonga
- Tobidioga
- Tohounguel
- Touka Bayel
- Touka Diomga
- Touka Korno
- Touka Ouro Nala
- Touka Welde
- Touka Weldou
- Welde Katchirga
- Yacouta
- Yebelba
- Yirga
