= Rodolphe Sorgho =

Governor of Sahel Region
- In office January 14, 2022 – January 13, 2025
- Preceded by: Salfo Kabore
- Succeeded by: Abdoul Karim Zongo

Defense Attache for the Permanent Mission of Burkina Faso to the United Nations
- Incumbent
- Assumed office January 14, 2025

Personal details
- Born: P. Fabien Rodolphe Sorgho
- Education: Royal Military Academy (Belgium)

Military service
- Rank: Lieutenant Colonel

P. Fabien Rodolphe Sorgho is a Burkinabe politician and military figure who served as Governor of Sahel Region from 2022 to 2025 and Defense Attache to the Permanent Mission of Burkina Faso to the United Nations since 2025.

== Biography ==
Little is known about Sorgho's early life. He attended the Royal Military Academy in Belgium and has served in the Burkinabe Army since 1999, rising to the rank of Lieutenant Colonel. On January 14, 2022, he was appointed the new governor of Sahel Region. On March 1, 2022, he was reappointed Governor of Sahel Region following the January 2022 Burkina Faso coup d'état. Sorgho supported the Burkinabe government's strategy of using VDP militiamen in convoys to unblock roads and cities under siege by jihadist groups. In a 2022 interview, he supported humanitarian activities in the region, and called on the UN to stop the cash handouts to civilian populations in the region. Sorgho also served as a government spokesman during large jihadist attacks in the region, such as the 2023 Arbinda kidnappings and the Kourakou and Tondobi attacks. In February 2024, Sorgho attended the opening ceremony of a well in Essakane provided by Iamgold. In 2024, Sorgho said in an interview that his government had managed to reopen schooling for many children in the region. On January 13, 2025, he was removed from his post and succeeded by Abdoul Karim Zongo. Sorgho was then appointed to be the Defense Attache for the Permanent Mission of Burkina Faso to the United Nations.
