= Kampiti =

- Location within Burkina Faso
- Coordinates: 14°2′0″N 0°1′0″E
- Country: Burkina Faso
- Province: Séno

Kampiti is a town located in the Séno Province in the region of Sahel in Burkina Faso. The settlement lies at an altitude of around 281 m (922 ft) above the sea level.
