= Bani Department =

Coordinates: 13.7170°N 0.1830°W

Bani
- Department
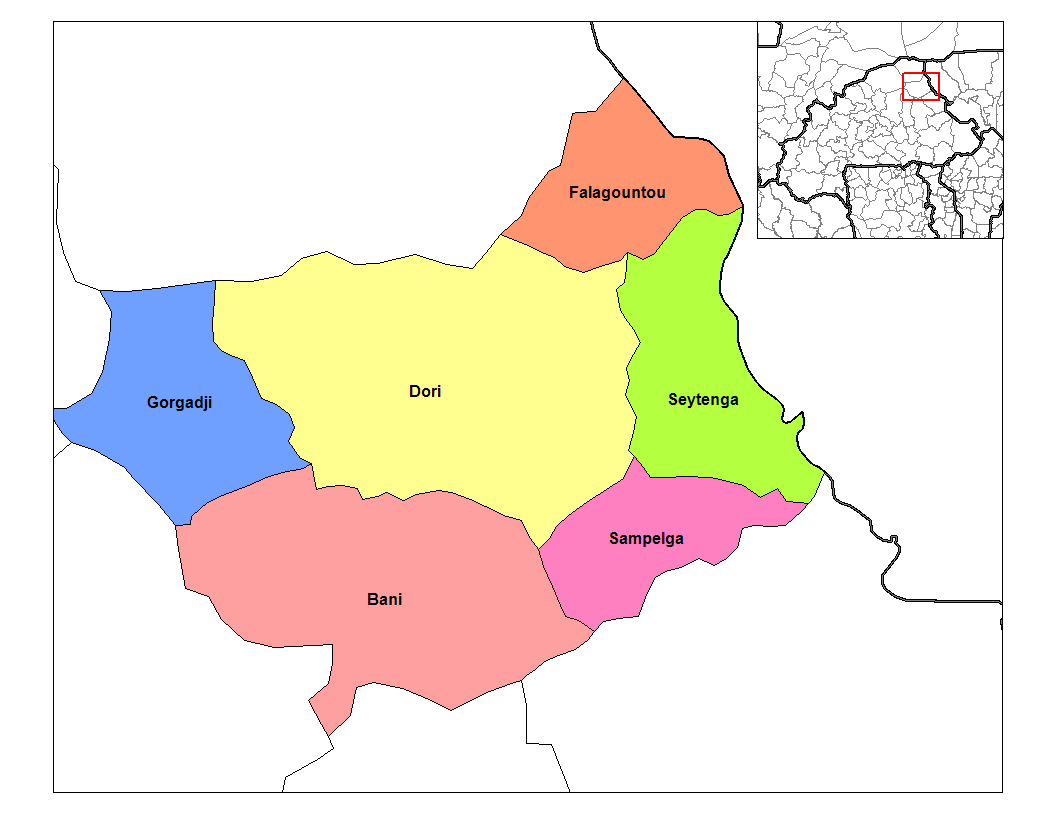
- Bani Department location in the province
- Country: Burkina Faso
- Province: Séno Province
- Time zone: UTC+0 (GMT 0)

Bani is a department of Séno Province in northern Burkina Faso. Its capital is the town of Bani which has a historic mosque and tower.

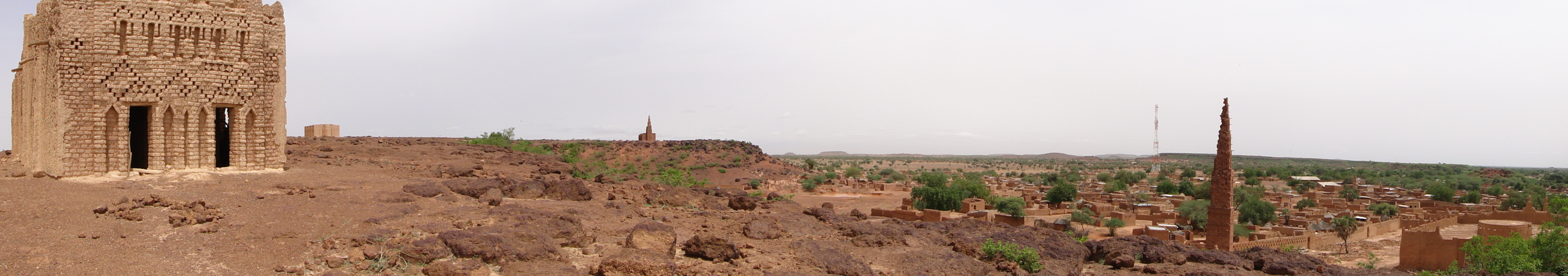
Panorama over Bani, the capital of Bani Department, 2010

== Gallery ==
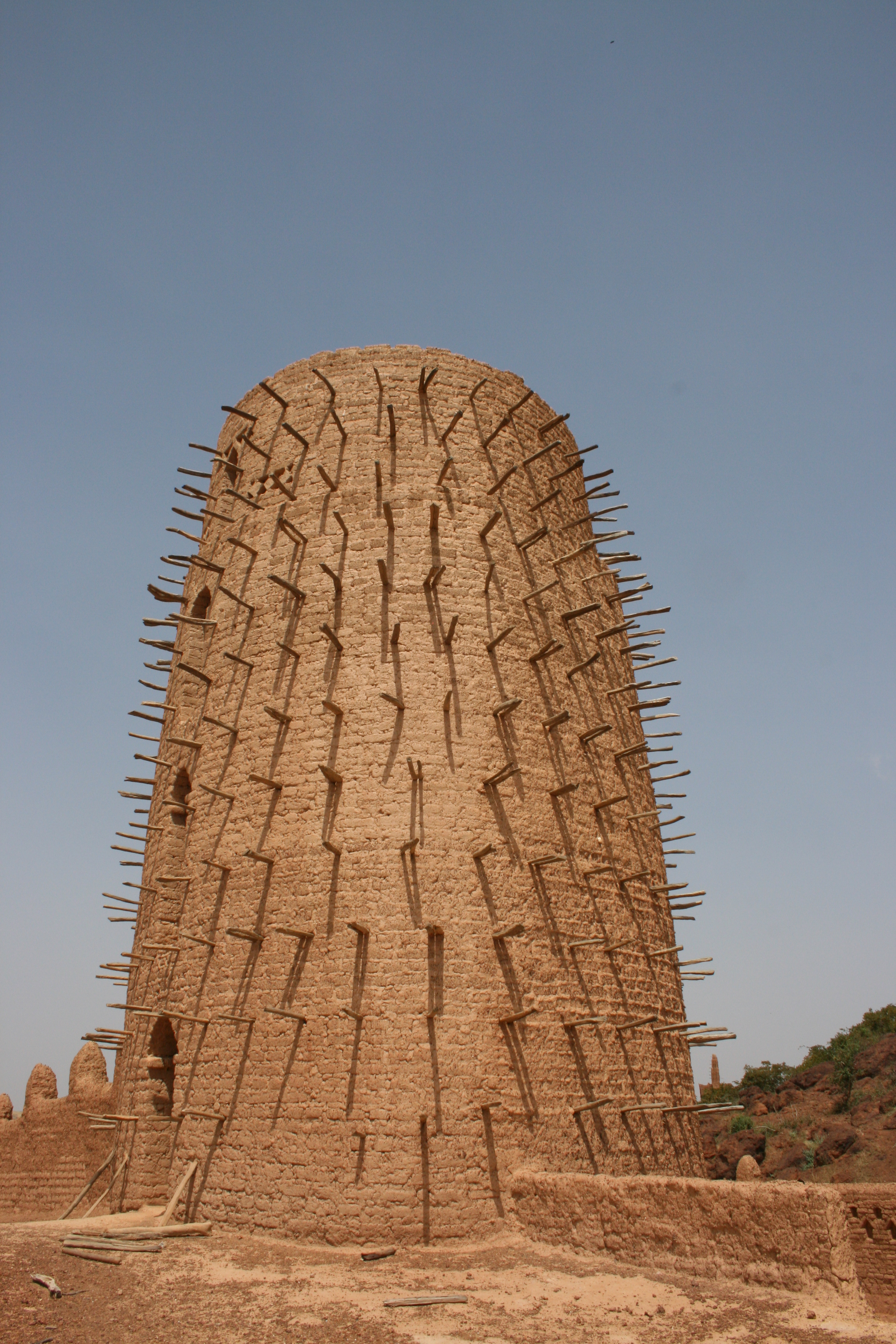
Minaret with protruding horizontal wooden sticks of the mosque of Bani, Burkina Faso, 2007

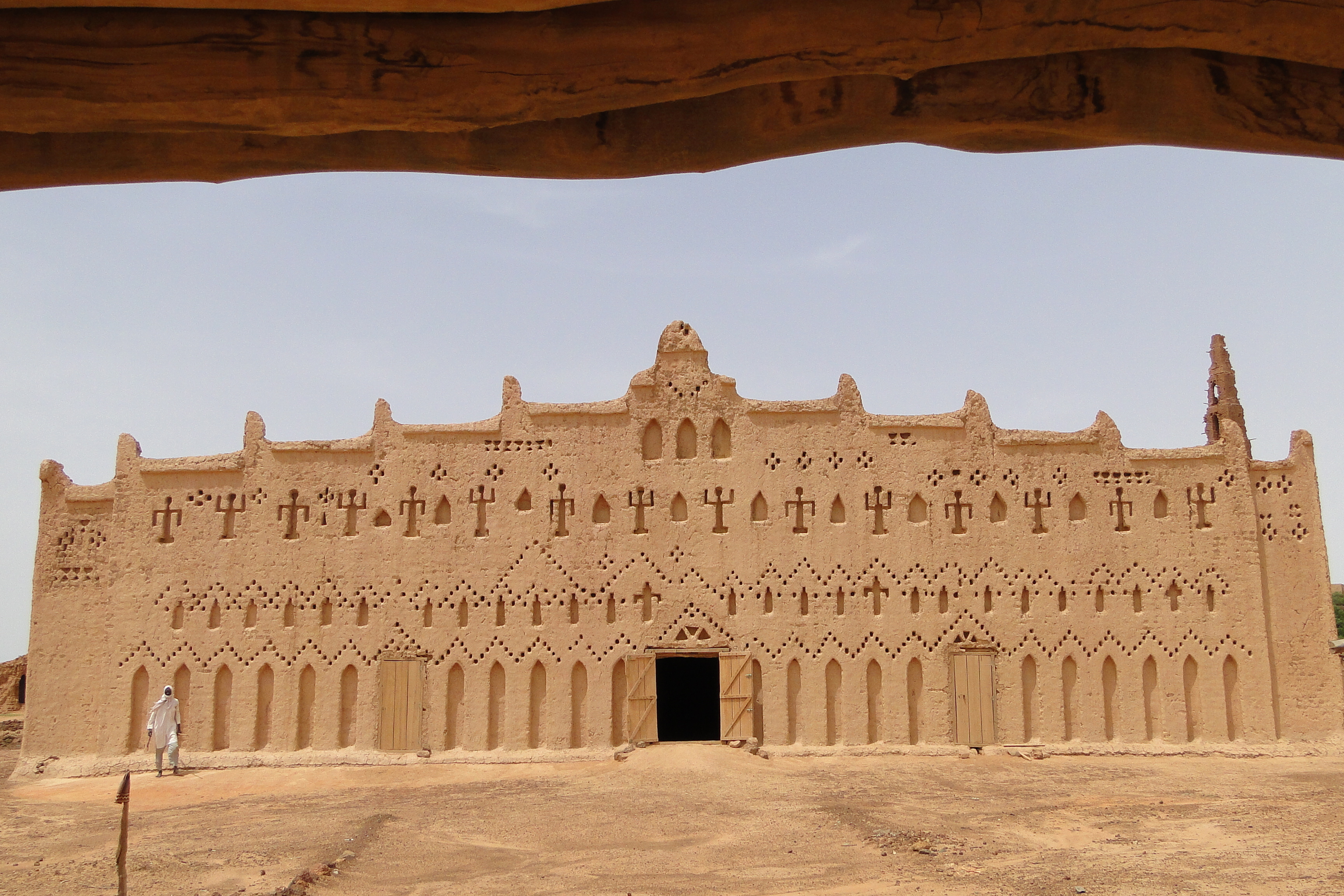
Mud mosque of Bani, 2010
