= Sampelga Department =

Coordinates: 13°45′N 0°13′E

Sampelga
- Department
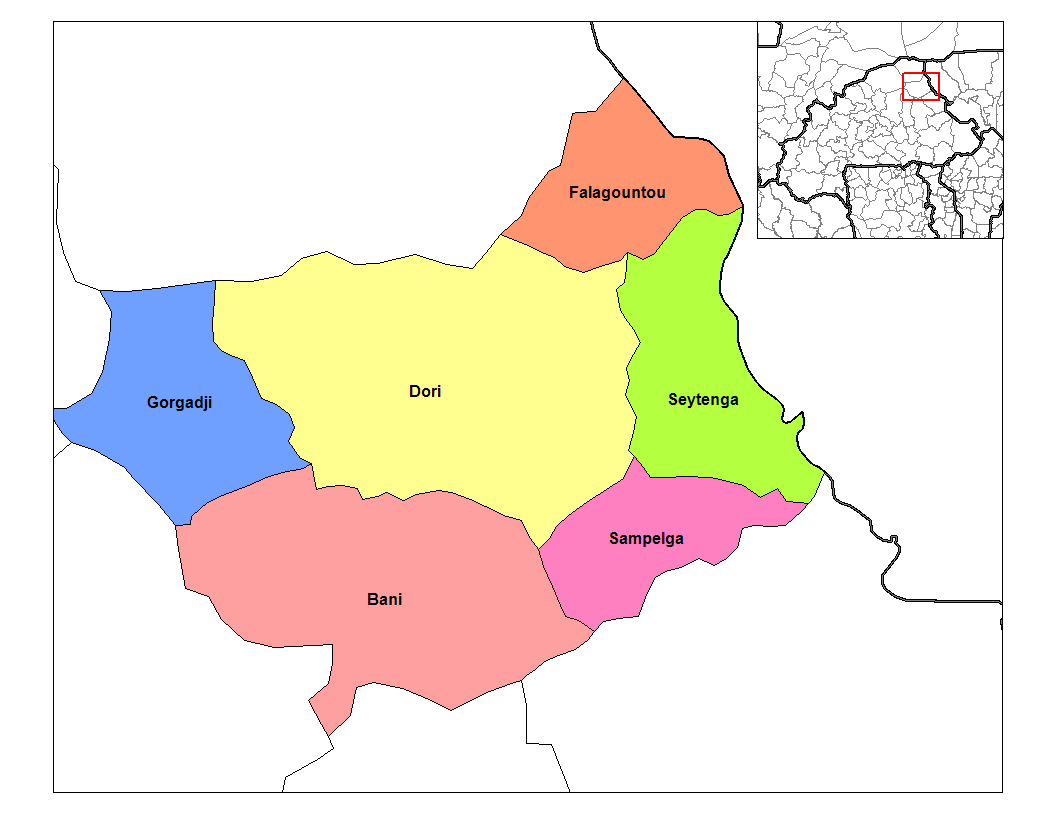
- Sampelga Department location in the province
- Country: Burkina Faso
- Province: Séno Province

Area
  - Total: 207.8 sq mi (538.3 km^{2})

Population (2019 census)
  - Total: 20,940
  - Density: 100.8/sq mi (38.90/km^{2})
- Time zone: UTC+0 (GMT 0)

Sampelga is a department or commune of Séno Province in northern Burkina Faso. Its capital lies at the town of Sampelga.
