= Bani, Bani =

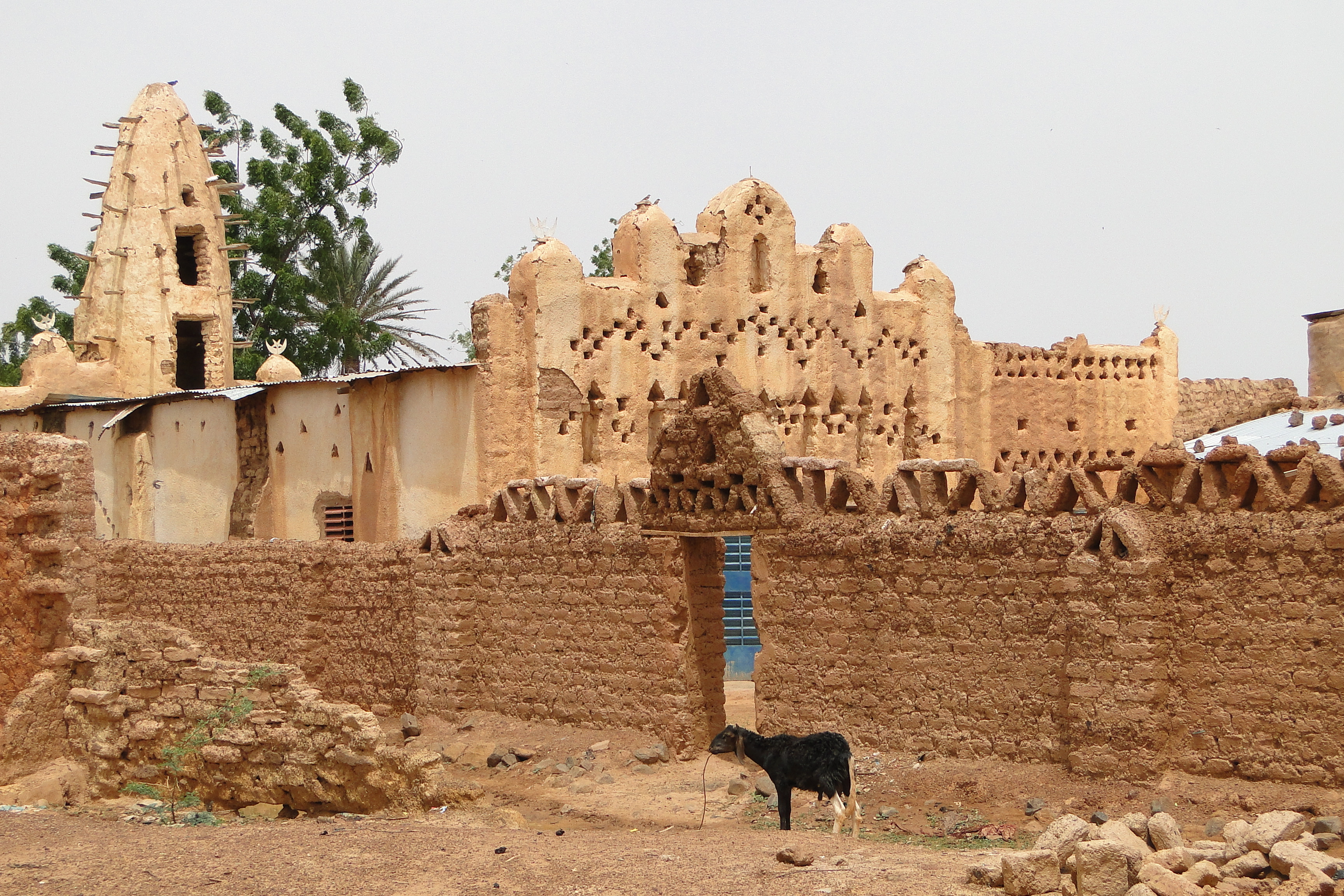
- Clay mosque of Bani, 2010

- Location in Burkina Faso
- Coordinates: 13°43′0.84″N 0°10′31.44″W
- Country: Burkina Faso
- Region: Sahel Region
- Province: Séno Province
- Department: Bani Department

Population
  - Total: town 5 771 in 2,008
- Time zone: UTC+0 (GMT 0)

Bani is the capital of Bani Department in Séno Province in northern Burkina Faso. It had a population of 5 771 in 2008. Bani is known for its seven mosques made of clay. It is situated between Kaya, Burkina Faso and Dori, Burkina Faso.

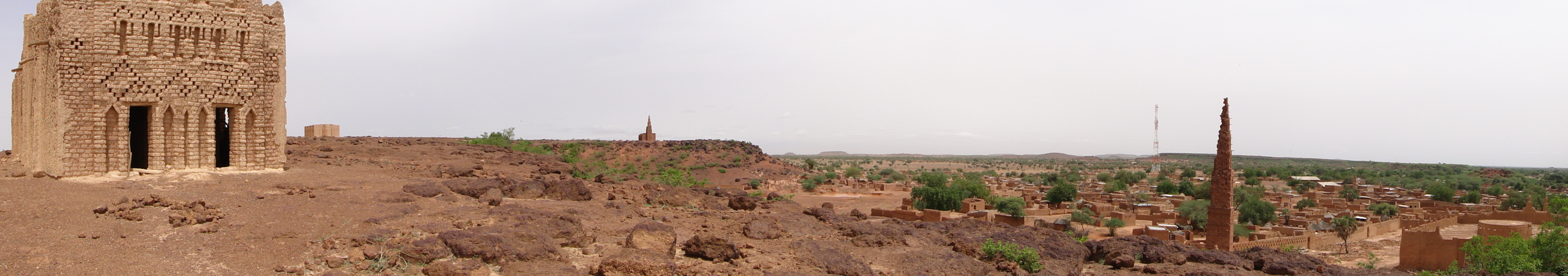
Panorama over Bani, the capital of Bani Department, 2010

== History ==
Bani's seven mosques were built in 1978 under the leadership of the Prophet Mohamed el-Hajj. They consist of six mosques built atop a hill, surrounding the grand mosque in the centre of town. Since then, these religious buildings have suffered from lack of maintenance, giving them an older, weathered appearance.

== Gallery ==
A boy in front of three mosques of Bani in the distance, 1983

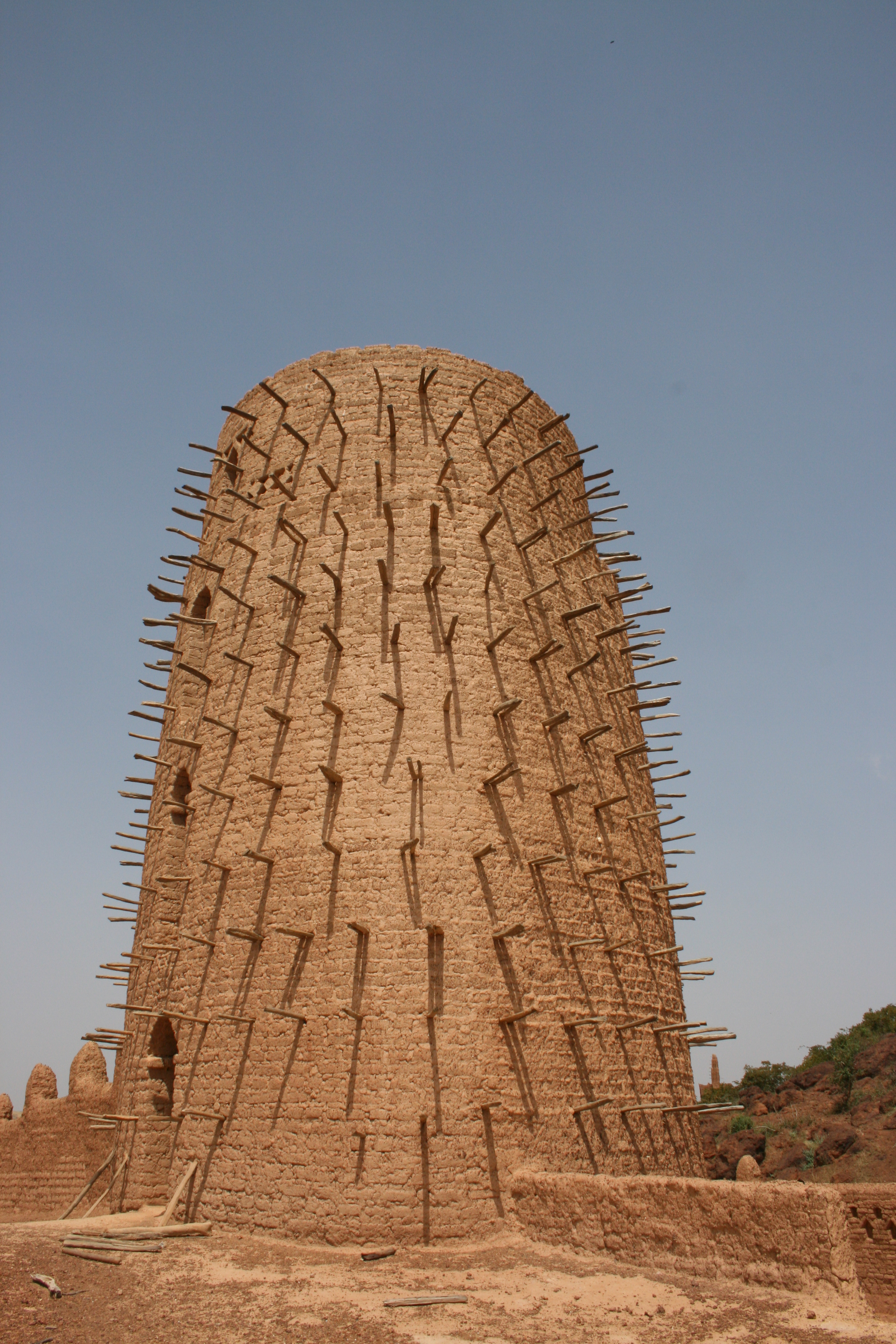
Minaret with protruding horizontal wooden sticks of the mosque of Bani, Burkina Faso, 2007

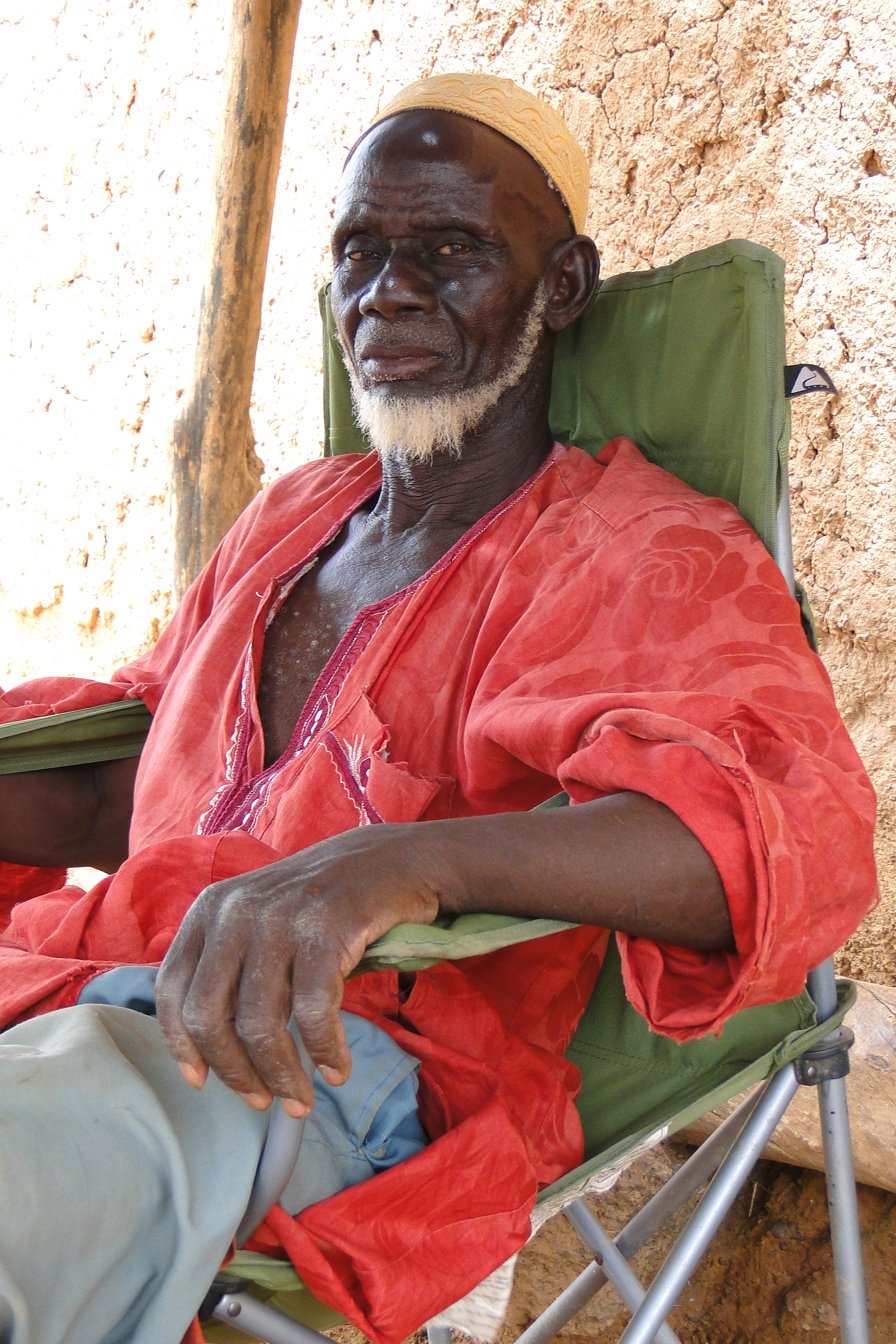
Village elder of Bani, 2010

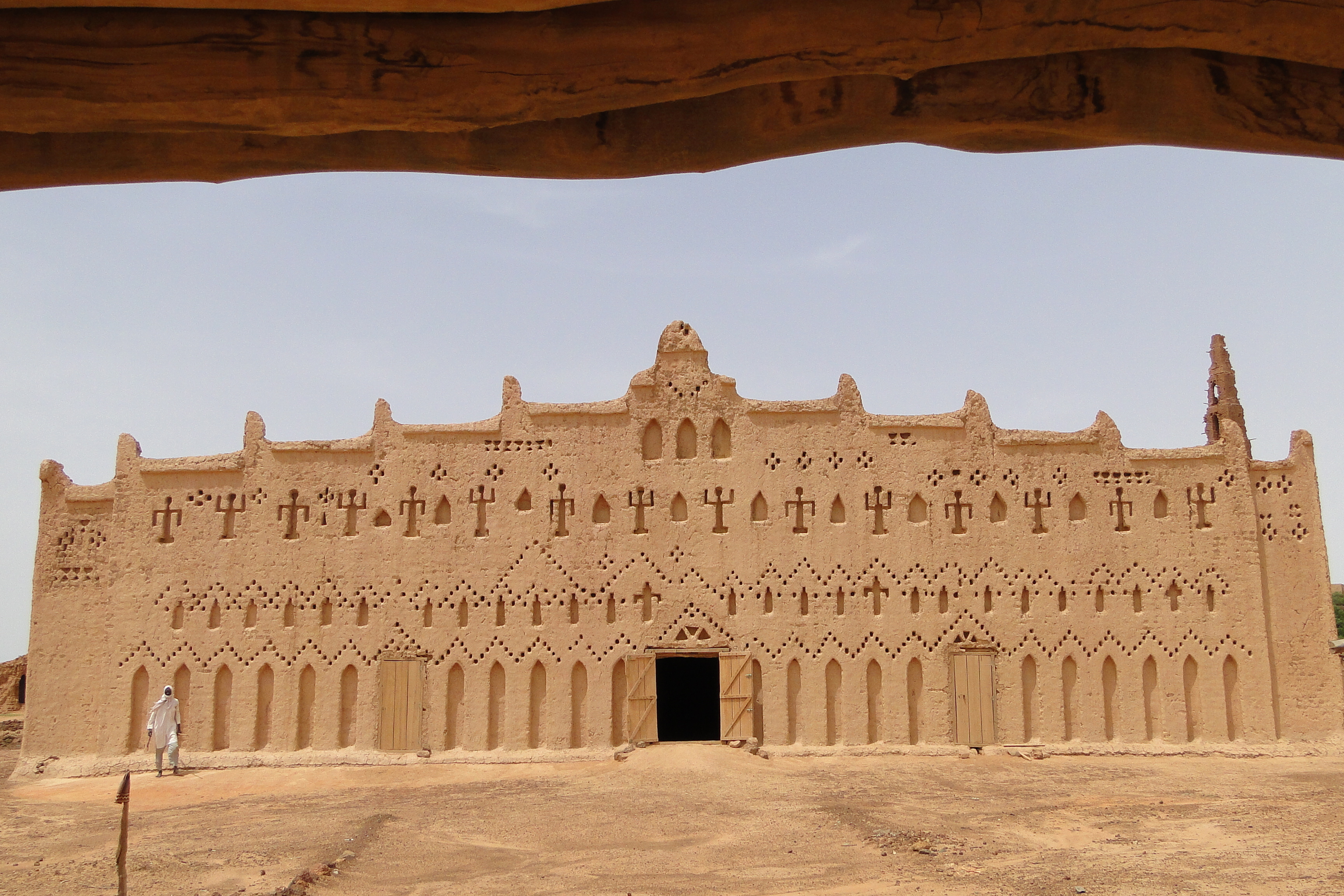
Mud mosque of Bani, 2010

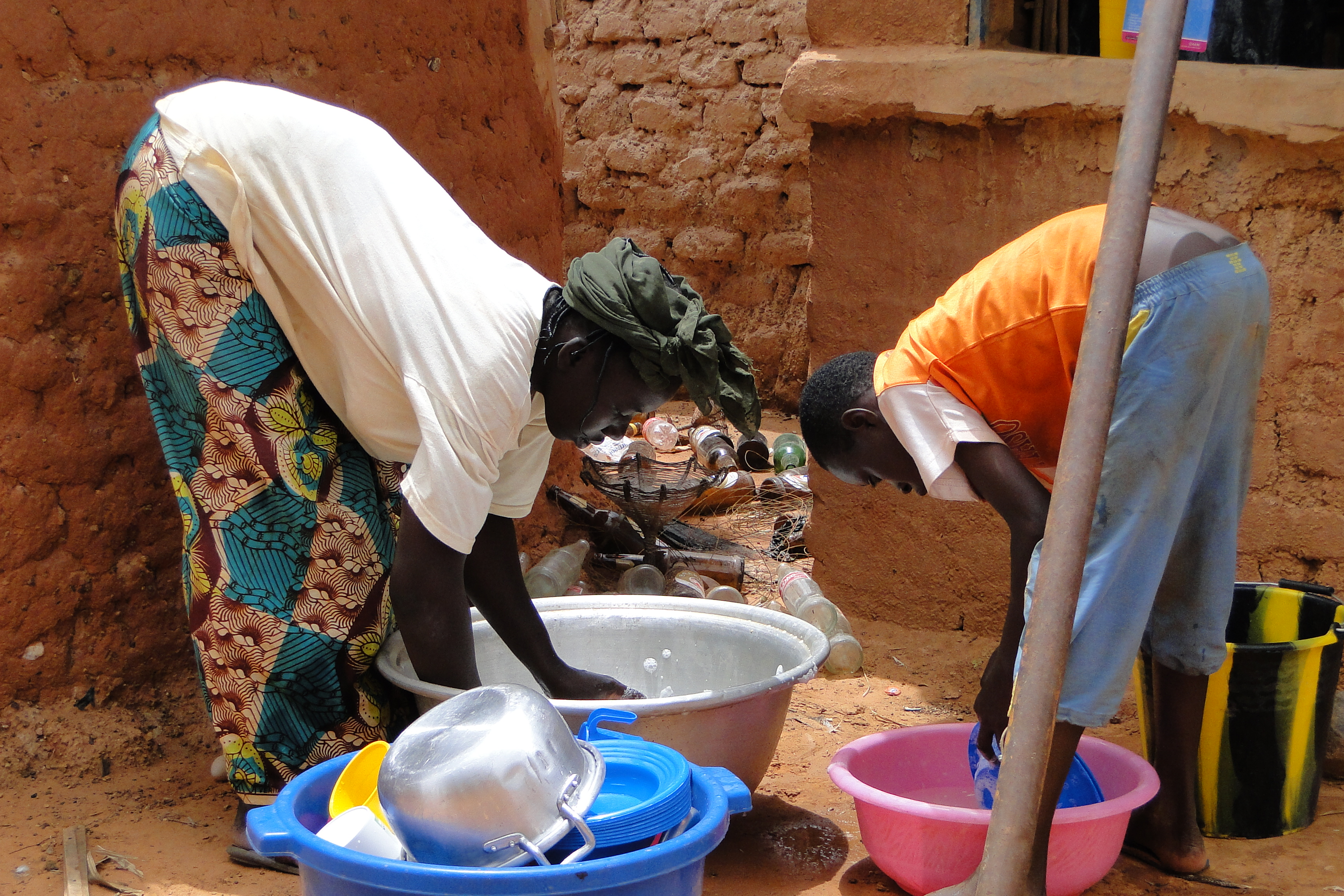
Two women wash the dishes at the hotel Nomad, Bani, 2010

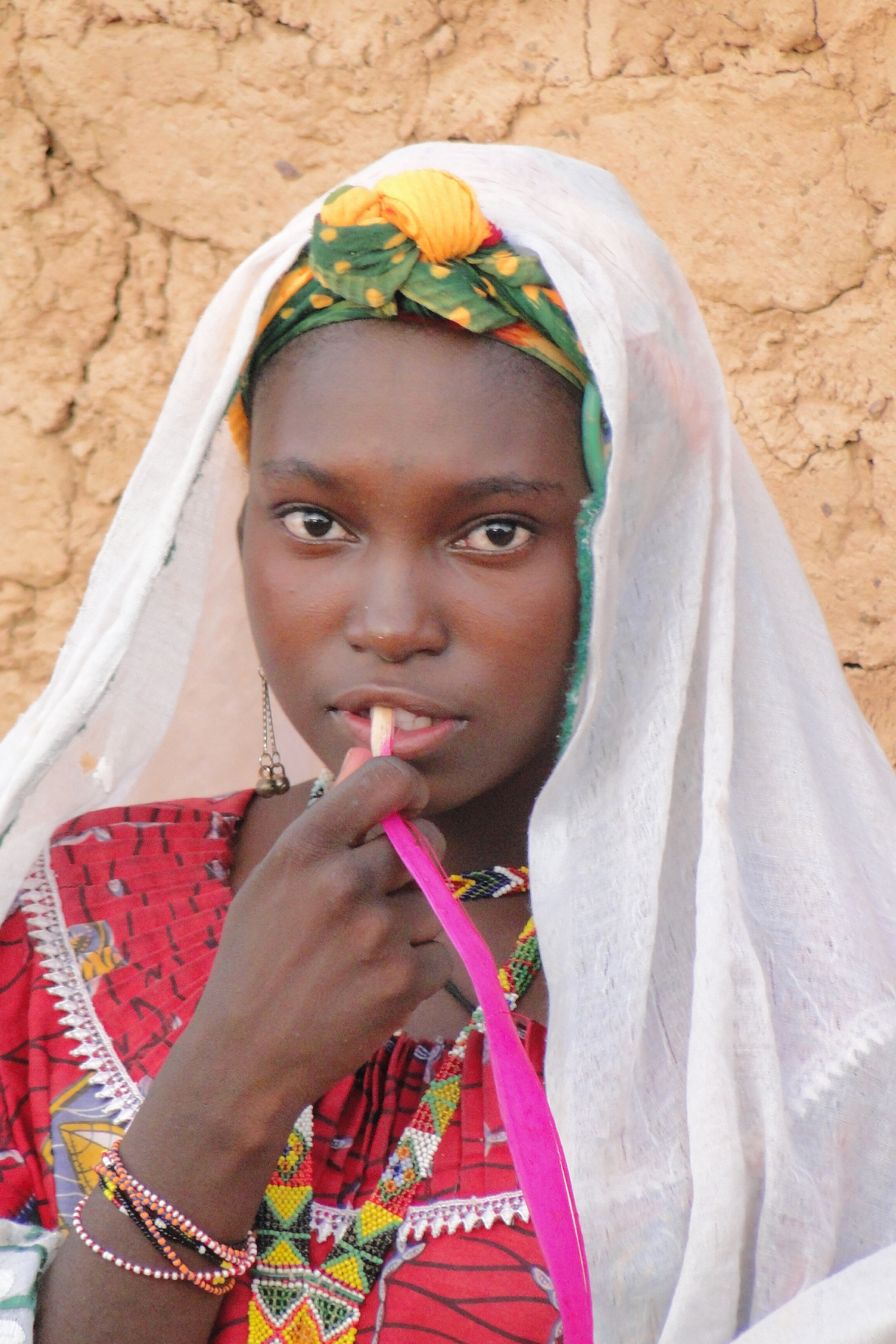
A young girl in traditional dress, Bani, 2010
