= Falagountou Department =

Coordinates: 14°21′36″N 0°10′57″E

Falagountou
- Department
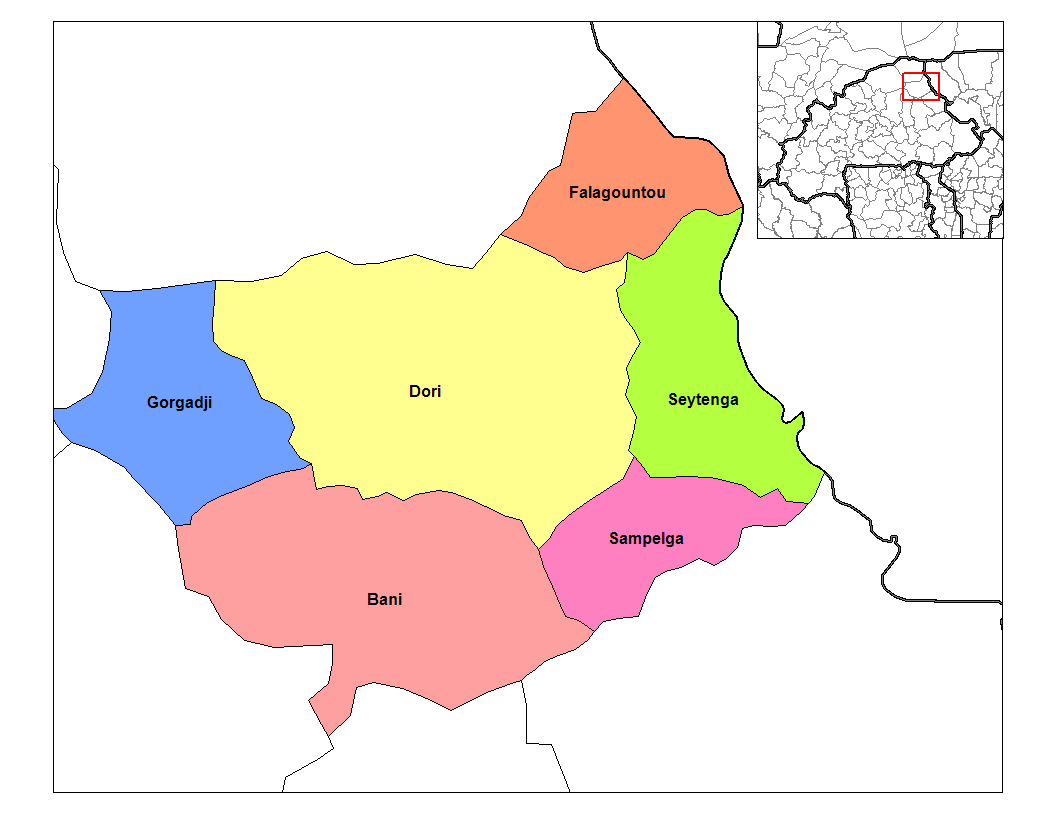
- Falagountou Department location in the province
- Country: Burkina Faso
- Province: Séno Province

Area
  - Total: 215.2 sq mi (557.3 km^{2})

Population (2019 census)
  - Total: 33,890
  - Density: 157.5/sq mi (60.81/km^{2})
- Time zone: UTC+0 (GMT 0)

Falagountou is a department or commune of Séno Province in northern Burkina Faso. Its capital lies at the town of Falagountou.

== Towns and villages ==
- Belgou
- Ekeou
- Fetobarabe
- Gomo
- Goulgountou
- Gourara
- Haïni
- Kargono
- Sella
- Wiboria
- Zargaloutan
- Zeydrabe
