= Falagountou =

- Location in Burkina Faso
- Coordinates: 14°21′55″N 0°11′03″W
- Country: Burkina Faso
- Region: Sahel Region
- Province: Séno Province
- Department: Falagountou Department

Population (2003)
  - Total: 7,969

Falagountou is a town in and the capital of the Falagountou Department of Séno Province in northern Burkina Faso. The town has a population of 7,969 as of 2003.
