= Seytenga Department =

Coordinates: 13°58′35″N 0°18′44″E

Seytenga
- Department
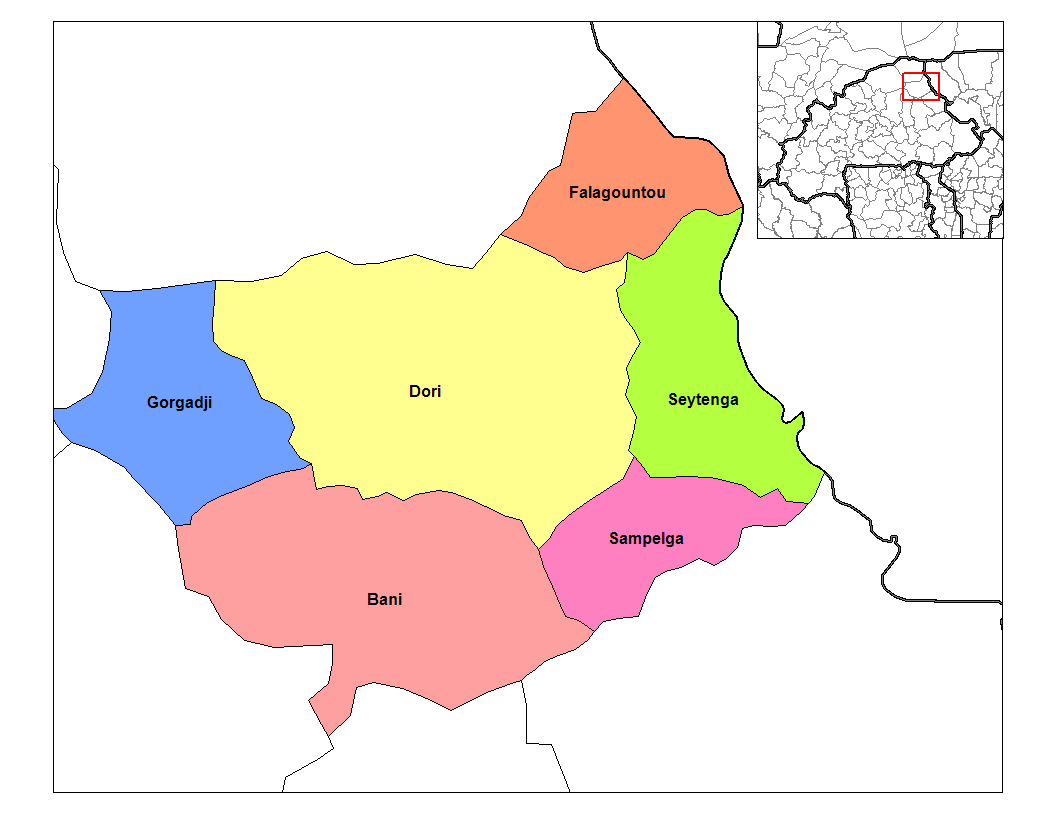
- Seytenga Department location in the province
- Country: Burkina Faso
- Province: Séno Province

Area
  - Total: 332.5 sq mi (861.2 km^{2})

Population (2019 census)
  - Total: 46,409
  - Density: 139.6/sq mi (53.89/km^{2})
- Time zone: UTC+0 (GMT 0)

Seytenga is a department or commune of Séno Province in northern Burkina Faso. Its capital lies at the town of Seytenga.
