= Goulgountou =

Village in Sahel Region, Burkina Faso

- Country: Burkina Faso
- Region: Sahel Region
- Province: Seno Province
- Department: Falagountou

Population
  - Total: 1,237 (2,003)

Goulgountou is a locality in Falagountou department of Séno Province, Sahel Region, Burkina Faso.

== History ==
Since the jihadist insurgency in Burkina Faso began in 2015, Goulgountou has been an area where the Islamic State – Sahil Province has operated. In January 2023, a jihadist shooting at a mosque led to nine deaths. Two men were arbitrarily arrested by pro-government Volunteers for the Defense of the Homeland fighters in February 2023.

== Economy ==
There is a small gold mine in Goulgountou. In May 2023, the Burkinabe government invested in further construction of the Goulgountou Health and Social Promotion Center.
