= 2023 Arbinda kidnappings =

- Part of Jihadist insurgency in Burkina Faso
- Location: Liki, near Arbinda, Burkina Faso
- Date: January 12–13, 2023
- Victims: 66 hostages: 27 women; 39 children
- Perpetrators: Jama'at Nasr al-Islam wal Muslimin (per Global Initiative); Ansarul Islam (per Amnesty)
- No. of participants: ~30

On January 12 and 13, 2023, jihadists kidnapped sixty-six people in two separate incidents near Arbinda, Burkina Faso. The abducted civilians were eventually freed by the Burkinabe military on January 20. The kidnappings were the first of their kind to target women during the insurgency.

== Background ==
Arbinda, in northern Burkina Faso, has been the site of several major attacks by Islamist groups during the jihadist insurgency in Burkina Faso that began in 2015. The city lies deep within territory largely controlled by al-Qaeda-aligned Jama'at Nasr al-Islam wal Muslimin and Ansarul Islam, although some areas are under influence by the Islamic State – Sahil Province (ISGS). Due to the severity of the conflict in Arbinda, many residents and residents of surrounding village forage for food, despite the danger involved.

On January 1, Zincko, a village in central Burkina Faso south of Arbinda, saw several attacks by jihadists. Liki, the commune where the Arbinda kidnappings took place, was under siege by Ansarul Islam.

== Kidnappings ==
Around midday on the 12th, a group of forty women and children were foraging in Liki commune, near Arbinda, when around thirty armed men on motorcycles in military clothing and turbans abducted them. The abductees were forced to walk over 130 kilometers to Foubé, in Barsalogho Department, where they were held. While the hostages were given food and water by the jihadists, survivors of the kidnapping stated that they were fearful of what the jihadists would do to them and their families.

Several women and children were able to escape the kidnapping. Three women who escaped the initial attack warned their villages. However, a second kidnapping targeting around twenty women took place the next day also near Arbinda. Immediately after the attack, the mayor of Dori, a nearby town, stated it was too early to tell whether JNIM or ISGS had captured the foragers.

State-run radio and television announced the retrieval of the captives by the Burkinabe military on January 20, eight days after the initial capture. In the statement, twenty-seven women and thirty-nine children were freed after being discovered at a bus security checkpoint 200 kilometers away from Liki. It was unknown whether or not all of the captives were retrieved, or if some had been killed in the operation to retrieve them.

== Reactions and culpability ==
The United Nations called for the release of the abducted women and children on January 17. The commissioner for human rights, Volker Türk, stated the Arbinda kidnappings were the first of its kind to target women during the insurgency.

Analysts suggested that the kidnapping was perpetrated to force pro-government VDP auxiliaries to search for the hostages in an area with sparse VDP and government presence, thereby increasing the probability of successful attacks by JNIM against the VDP.

Both JNIM and Ansarul Islam have been accused of the kidnappings.
