= Séno Province =

Coordinates: 14°02′N 0°02′W

Séno
- Province
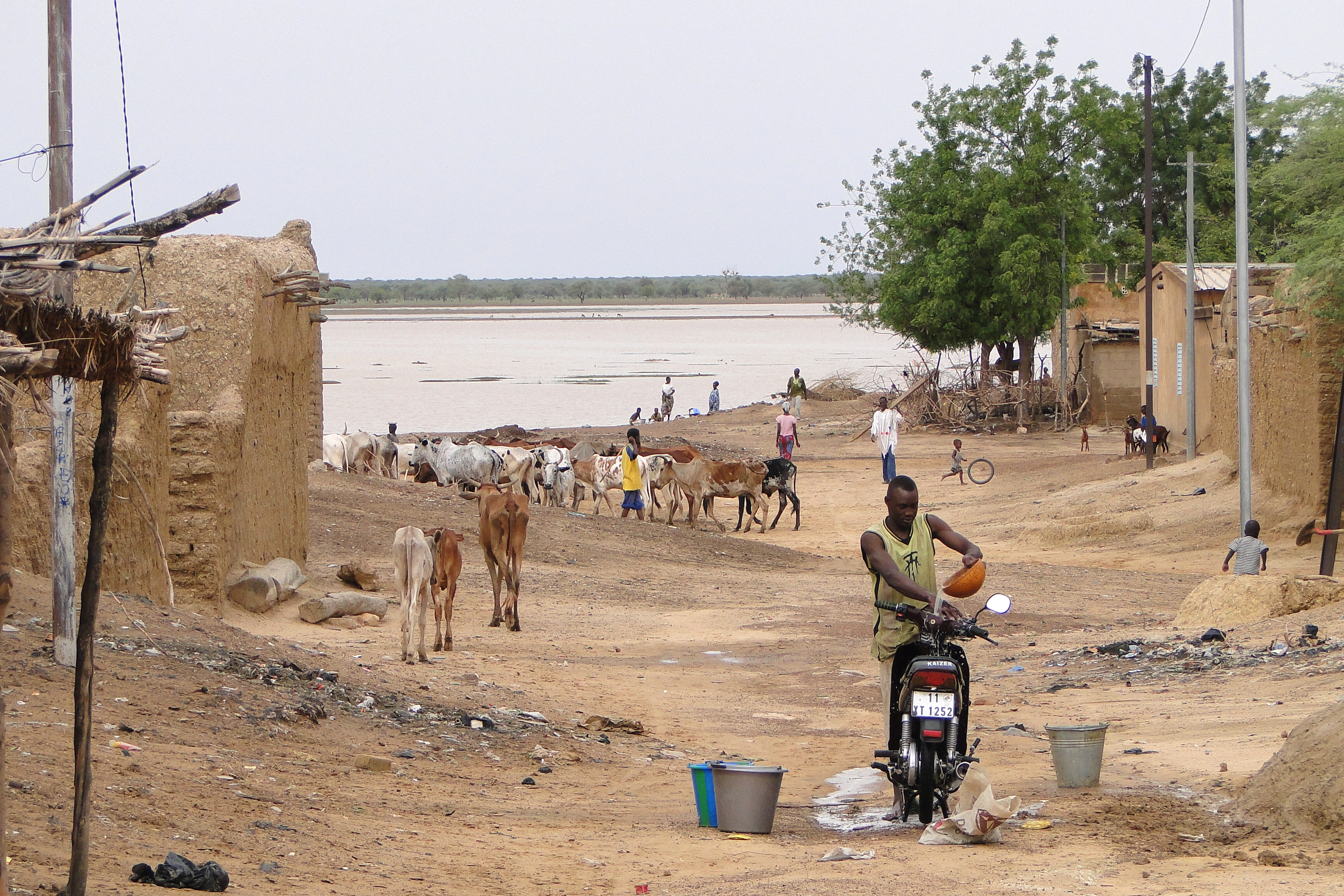
- A Street in Dori, capital of Séno Province

- Location in Burkina Faso

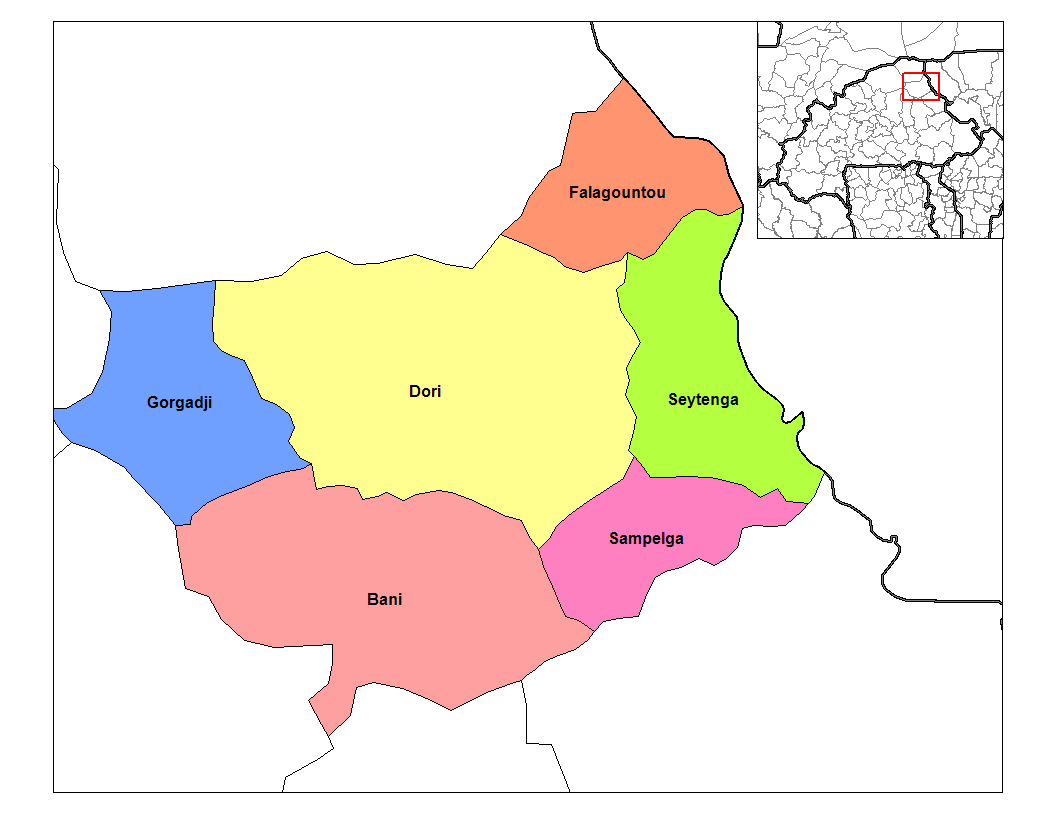
- Provincial map of its departments
- Country: Burkina Faso
- Region: Sahel Region
- Capital: Dori

Area
  - Province: 6,866 km^{2} (2,651 sq mi)

Population (2019 census)
  - Province: 404,104
  - Density: 58.86/km^{2} (152.4/sq mi)
  - Urban: 46,512
- Time zone: UTC+0 (GMT 0)

Séno is one of the 45 provinces of Burkina Faso, located in its Sahel Region. The name of the province comes from the Fulfulde seeno, for "sandy plain."

Its capital is Dori.

== Departments ==
Seno is divided into 6 departments:

The Departments of Séno
Department	Capital city	Population (Census 2006)
Bani Department	Bani, Bani	59,452
Dori Department	Dori	98,006
Falagountou Department	Falagountou	26,047
Gorgadji Department	Gorgadji	30,630
Sampelga Department	Sampelga	19,258
Seytenga Department	Seytenga	31,422

== See also ==
- Regions of Burkina Faso
- Provinces of Burkina Faso
- Departments of Burkina Faso
