= List of minor planets: 453001–454000 =

The following is a partial list of minor planets, running from minor-planet number 453001 through 454000, inclusive. The primary data for this and other partial lists is based on JPL's "Small-Body Orbital Elements" and data available from the Minor Planet Center. Critical list information is also provided by the MPC, unless otherwise specified from Lowell Observatory. A detailed description of the table's columns and additional sources are given on the main page including a complete list of every page in this series, and a statistical break-up on the dynamical classification of minor planets.

Also see the summary list of all named bodies in numerical and alphabetical order, and the corresponding naming citations for the number range of this particular list. New namings may only be added to this list after official publication, as the preannouncement of names is condemned by the Working Group for Small Bodies Nomenclature of the International Astronomical Union.

Near-Earth obj.	MBA (inner)	MBA (outer)	Centaur
Mars-crosser	MBA (middle)	Jupiter trojan	Trans-Neptunian obj.
Unclassified

== 453001–453100 ==
Designation			Discovery			Properties		Ref
Permanent	Provisional	Named after	Date	Site	Discoverer(s)	Category	Diam.	Ref
453001	2007 HW_{95}	—	April 22, 2007	Kitt Peak	Spacewatch	·	2.1 km	MPC · JPL
453002	2007 JE_{1}	—	May 7, 2007	Kitt Peak	Spacewatch	·	4.0 km	MPC · JPL
453003	2007 JC_{27}	—	May 9, 2007	Kitt Peak	Spacewatch	·	2.5 km	MPC · JPL
453004	2007 JF_{31}	—	May 12, 2007	Kitt Peak	Spacewatch	·	760 m	MPC · JPL
453005	2007 JO_{35}	—	May 14, 2007	Tiki	S. F. Hönig, Teamo, N.	·	2.7 km	MPC · JPL
453006	2007 JB_{38}	—	December 30, 2005	Kitt Peak	Spacewatch	·	1.7 km	MPC · JPL
453007	2007 JB_{41}	—	May 13, 2007	Mount Lemmon	Mount Lemmon Survey	·	1.3 km	MPC · JPL
453008	2007 LX_{5}	—	April 24, 2007	Mount Lemmon	Mount Lemmon Survey	·	2.7 km	MPC · JPL
453009	2007 LS_{9}	—	June 8, 2007	Kitt Peak	Spacewatch	NYS	1.1 km	MPC · JPL
453010	2007 LE_{12}	—	June 9, 2007	Kitt Peak	Spacewatch	·	3.8 km	MPC · JPL
453011	2007 LD_{32}	—	June 15, 2007	Kitt Peak	Spacewatch	·	3.2 km	MPC · JPL
453012	2007 PG_{24}	—	August 12, 2007	Socorro	LINEAR	·	960 m	MPC · JPL
453013	2007 QN_{5}	—	August 17, 2007	Purple Mountain	PMO NEO Survey Program	ERI	1.7 km	MPC · JPL
453014	2007 QC_{13}	—	August 21, 2007	Anderson Mesa	LONEOS	NYS	1.2 km	MPC · JPL
453015	2007 QF_{13}	—	August 24, 2007	Kitt Peak	Spacewatch	NYS	940 m	MPC · JPL
453016	2007 QM_{16}	—	December 23, 2000	Kitt Peak	Spacewatch	·	1.6 km	MPC · JPL
453017	2007 QU_{16}	—	August 22, 2007	Anderson Mesa	LONEOS	NYS	1.5 km	MPC · JPL
453018	2007 RZ_{2}	—	August 22, 2007	Anderson Mesa	LONEOS	MAS	790 m	MPC · JPL
453019	2007 RX_{13}	—	August 10, 2007	Kitt Peak	Spacewatch	NYS	990 m	MPC · JPL
453020	2007 RZ_{29}	—	August 23, 2007	Kitt Peak	Spacewatch	·	1.2 km	MPC · JPL
453021	2007 RL_{41}	—	September 3, 2007	Catalina	CSS	·	1.2 km	MPC · JPL
453022	2007 RS_{51}	—	September 9, 2007	Kitt Peak	Spacewatch	V	770 m	MPC · JPL
453023	2007 RS_{83}	—	August 21, 2007	Anderson Mesa	LONEOS	·	1.1 km	MPC · JPL
453024	2007 RK_{109}	—	September 11, 2007	Kitt Peak	Spacewatch	·	1.0 km	MPC · JPL
453025	2007 RM_{138}	—	August 21, 2007	Anderson Mesa	LONEOS	·	1.3 km	MPC · JPL
453026	2007 RP_{187}	—	September 13, 2007	Mount Lemmon	Mount Lemmon Survey	NYS	1 km	MPC · JPL
453027	2007 RV_{189}	—	September 10, 2007	Kitt Peak	Spacewatch	·	1.4 km	MPC · JPL
453028	2007 RR_{209}	—	September 10, 2007	Kitt Peak	Spacewatch	·	1.1 km	MPC · JPL
453029	2007 RP_{213}	—	July 18, 2007	Mount Lemmon	Mount Lemmon Survey	MAS	690 m	MPC · JPL
453030	2007 RS_{252}	—	September 13, 2007	Mount Lemmon	Mount Lemmon Survey	·	720 m	MPC · JPL
453031	2007 RW_{266}	—	September 15, 2007	Kitt Peak	Spacewatch	·	910 m	MPC · JPL
453032	2007 RK_{301}	—	September 13, 2007	Mount Lemmon	Mount Lemmon Survey	·	800 m	MPC · JPL
453033	2007 RD_{310}	—	September 4, 2007	Catalina	CSS	·	1.5 km	MPC · JPL
453034	2007 RA_{315}	—	September 6, 2007	Anderson Mesa	LONEOS	·	960 m	MPC · JPL
453035	2007 RC_{315}	—	September 7, 2007	Socorro	LINEAR	NYS	1.1 km	MPC · JPL
453036	2007 RN_{316}	—	September 9, 2007	Kitt Peak	Spacewatch	NYS	1.4 km	MPC · JPL
453037	2007 RG_{321}	—	September 13, 2007	Catalina	CSS	·	1.5 km	MPC · JPL
453038	2007 RH_{322}	—	September 11, 2007	Mount Lemmon	Mount Lemmon Survey	CYB	3.8 km	MPC · JPL
453039	2007 RB_{325}	—	September 14, 2007	Catalina	CSS	H	550 m	MPC · JPL
453040	2007 SL_{3}	—	September 16, 2007	Socorro	LINEAR	MAS	750 m	MPC · JPL
453041	2007 SB_{15}	—	September 21, 2007	Kitt Peak	Spacewatch	H	530 m	MPC · JPL
453042	2007 SY_{15}	—	August 21, 2007	Anderson Mesa	LONEOS	MAS	760 m	MPC · JPL
453043	2007 TQ_{45}	—	October 7, 2007	Mount Lemmon	Mount Lemmon Survey	3:2	3.5 km	MPC · JPL
453044	2007 TB_{47}	—	October 4, 2007	Kitt Peak	Spacewatch	·	1.1 km	MPC · JPL
453045	2007 TY_{50}	—	October 4, 2007	Kitt Peak	Spacewatch	·	1.3 km	MPC · JPL
453046	2007 TG_{51}	—	September 17, 2003	Kitt Peak	Spacewatch	·	880 m	MPC · JPL
453047	2007 TO_{59}	—	October 5, 2007	Kitt Peak	Spacewatch	·	1.1 km	MPC · JPL
453048	2007 TV_{72}	—	October 12, 2007	Socorro	LINEAR	H	460 m	MPC · JPL
453049	2007 TO_{147}	—	October 7, 2007	Socorro	LINEAR	NYS	1.3 km	MPC · JPL
453050	2007 TP_{155}	—	October 11, 2007	Catalina	CSS	·	1.3 km	MPC · JPL
453051	2007 TU_{155}	—	October 9, 2007	Socorro	LINEAR	·	1.1 km	MPC · JPL
453052	2007 TM_{161}	—	September 12, 2007	Mount Lemmon	Mount Lemmon Survey	critical	790 m	MPC · JPL
453053	2007 TY_{198}	—	October 8, 2007	Kitt Peak	Spacewatch	·	1.2 km	MPC · JPL
453054	2007 TC_{204}	—	October 8, 2007	Mount Lemmon	Mount Lemmon Survey	·	1.2 km	MPC · JPL
453055	2007 TL_{234}	—	October 8, 2007	Kitt Peak	Spacewatch	3:2	3.9 km	MPC · JPL
453056	2007 TC_{240}	—	October 4, 2007	Kitt Peak	Spacewatch	·	1.2 km	MPC · JPL
453057	2007 TT_{253}	—	October 8, 2007	Mount Lemmon	Mount Lemmon Survey	·	1.1 km	MPC · JPL
453058	2007 TL_{260}	—	October 10, 2007	Kitt Peak	Spacewatch	·	1.1 km	MPC · JPL
453059	2007 TB_{317}	—	September 13, 2007	Mount Lemmon	Mount Lemmon Survey	·	1.1 km	MPC · JPL
453060	2007 TO_{350}	—	August 23, 2007	Kitt Peak	Spacewatch	·	1.3 km	MPC · JPL
453061	2007 TF_{357}	—	September 14, 2007	Catalina	CSS	PHO	910 m	MPC · JPL
453062	2007 TP_{430}	—	October 13, 2007	Mount Lemmon	Mount Lemmon Survey	·	1.3 km	MPC · JPL
453063	2007 UC_{11}	—	October 19, 2007	Catalina	CSS	·	2.2 km	MPC · JPL
453064	2007 UE_{15}	—	October 18, 2007	Mount Lemmon	Mount Lemmon Survey	MAS	630 m	MPC · JPL
453065	2007 UA_{19}	—	October 18, 2007	Mount Lemmon	Mount Lemmon Survey	·	1.0 km	MPC · JPL
453066	2007 UX_{27}	—	October 16, 2007	Mount Lemmon	Mount Lemmon Survey	NYS	1.0 km	MPC · JPL
453067	2007 UO_{31}	—	October 19, 2007	Mount Lemmon	Mount Lemmon Survey	·	850 m	MPC · JPL
453068	2007 UW_{49}	—	October 24, 2007	Mount Lemmon	Mount Lemmon Survey	(5)	1.1 km	MPC · JPL
453069	2007 UP_{51}	—	October 14, 2007	Mount Lemmon	Mount Lemmon Survey	ADE	1.8 km	MPC · JPL
453070	2007 UB_{55}	—	October 30, 2007	Kitt Peak	Spacewatch	·	1.1 km	MPC · JPL
453071	2007 UE_{68}	—	October 30, 2007	Kitt Peak	Spacewatch	MAS	720 m	MPC · JPL
453072	2007 UP_{101}	—	September 10, 2007	Mount Lemmon	Mount Lemmon Survey	·	880 m	MPC · JPL
453073	2007 UM_{140}	—	October 17, 2007	Mount Lemmon	Mount Lemmon Survey	·	1.4 km	MPC · JPL
453074	2007 VD_{6}	—	November 3, 2007	Catalina	CSS	H	540 m	MPC · JPL
453075	2007 VP_{8}	—	October 20, 2007	Mount Lemmon	Mount Lemmon Survey	·	1.1 km	MPC · JPL
453076	2007 VJ_{9}	—	October 20, 2007	Mount Lemmon	Mount Lemmon Survey	(5)	1.3 km	MPC · JPL
453077	2007 VD_{11}	—	November 2, 2007	Kitt Peak	Spacewatch	T_{j} (2.96)	4.1 km	MPC · JPL
453078	2007 VU_{23}	—	October 9, 2007	Mount Lemmon	Mount Lemmon Survey	·	920 m	MPC · JPL
453079	2007 VZ_{42}	—	November 3, 2007	Kitt Peak	Spacewatch	·	1.2 km	MPC · JPL
453080	2007 VA_{51}	—	November 1, 2007	Kitt Peak	Spacewatch	·	1.3 km	MPC · JPL
453081	2007 VB_{55}	—	November 1, 2007	Kitt Peak	Spacewatch	·	1.2 km	MPC · JPL
453082	2007 VU_{58}	—	September 14, 2007	Mount Lemmon	Mount Lemmon Survey	·	1.3 km	MPC · JPL
453083	2007 VW_{114}	—	November 3, 2007	Kitt Peak	Spacewatch	·	840 m	MPC · JPL
453084	2007 VQ_{152}	—	November 2, 2007	Mount Lemmon	Mount Lemmon Survey	·	1.6 km	MPC · JPL
453085	2007 VN_{154}	—	November 5, 2007	Kitt Peak	Spacewatch	·	1.2 km	MPC · JPL
453086	2007 VS_{158}	—	November 5, 2007	Kitt Peak	Spacewatch	·	1.3 km	MPC · JPL
453087	2007 VR_{162}	—	November 5, 2007	Kitt Peak	Spacewatch	T_{j} (2.95)	3.1 km	MPC · JPL
453088	2007 VB_{169}	—	November 5, 2007	Kitt Peak	Spacewatch	·	2.0 km	MPC · JPL
453089	2007 VG_{191}	—	November 4, 2007	Kitt Peak	Spacewatch	·	800 m	MPC · JPL
453090	2007 VR_{194}	—	November 5, 2007	Mount Lemmon	Mount Lemmon Survey	(5)	1.3 km	MPC · JPL
453091	2007 VY_{194}	—	November 5, 2007	Mount Lemmon	Mount Lemmon Survey	·	1.3 km	MPC · JPL
453092	2007 VD_{197}	—	November 7, 2007	Mount Lemmon	Mount Lemmon Survey	·	990 m	MPC · JPL
453093	2007 VW_{202}	—	November 7, 2007	Mount Lemmon	Mount Lemmon Survey	H	590 m	MPC · JPL
453094	2007 VK_{206}	—	September 25, 2007	Mount Lemmon	Mount Lemmon Survey	H	560 m	MPC · JPL
453095	2007 VP_{274}	—	November 5, 2007	Kitt Peak	Spacewatch	·	1.1 km	MPC · JPL
453096	2007 VY_{300}	—	November 9, 2007	Catalina	CSS	·	1.5 km	MPC · JPL
453097	2007 VX_{310}	—	November 5, 2007	Mount Lemmon	Mount Lemmon Survey	·	1.2 km	MPC · JPL
453098	2007 VN_{325}	—	November 2, 2007	Kitt Peak	Spacewatch	·	710 m	MPC · JPL
453099	2007 VS_{328}	—	November 9, 2007	Kitt Peak	Spacewatch	EUN	1.1 km	MPC · JPL
453100	2007 WU_{4}	—	November 19, 2007	Kitt Peak	Spacewatch	AMO	580 m	MPC · JPL

== 453101–453200 ==
back to top

Designation			Discovery			Properties		Ref
Permanent	Provisional	Named after	Date	Site	Discoverer(s)	Category	Diam.	Ref
453101	2007 WE_{37}	—	November 19, 2007	Mount Lemmon	Mount Lemmon Survey	·	980 m	MPC · JPL
453102	2007 WC_{41}	—	October 10, 2007	Kitt Peak	Spacewatch	3:2	4.1 km	MPC · JPL
453103	2007 WM_{52}	—	November 20, 2007	Mount Lemmon	Mount Lemmon Survey	·	1.7 km	MPC · JPL
453104	2007 WW_{58}	—	November 19, 2007	Mount Lemmon	Mount Lemmon Survey	·	1.4 km	MPC · JPL
453105	2007 WY_{59}	—	November 19, 2007	Kitt Peak	Spacewatch	MAR	1.1 km	MPC · JPL
453106	2007 WR_{62}	—	November 18, 2007	Mount Lemmon	Mount Lemmon Survey	·	2.4 km	MPC · JPL
453107	2007 XW_{9}	—	September 14, 2004	Siding Spring	SSS	H	660 m	MPC · JPL
453108	2007 XN_{18}	—	December 12, 2007	La Sagra	OAM	H	550 m	MPC · JPL
453109	2007 XV_{20}	—	December 12, 2007	La Sagra	OAM	·	2.1 km	MPC · JPL
453110	2007 XS_{52}	—	December 3, 2007	Kitt Peak	Spacewatch	·	1.1 km	MPC · JPL
453111	2007 XD_{55}	—	December 14, 2007	Mount Lemmon	Mount Lemmon Survey	·	1.3 km	MPC · JPL
453112	2007 XF_{59}	—	December 18, 2007	Kitt Peak	Spacewatch	·	1.3 km	MPC · JPL
453113	2007 YN_{7}	—	December 16, 2007	Kitt Peak	Spacewatch	·	1.1 km	MPC · JPL
453114	2007 YS_{12}	—	December 17, 2007	Mount Lemmon	Mount Lemmon Survey	·	900 m	MPC · JPL
453115	2007 YD_{20}	—	December 16, 2007	Kitt Peak	Spacewatch	·	1.4 km	MPC · JPL
453116	2007 YN_{20}	—	November 14, 2007	Mount Lemmon	Mount Lemmon Survey	·	1.1 km	MPC · JPL
453117	2007 YL_{30}	—	December 4, 2007	Kitt Peak	Spacewatch	·	1.4 km	MPC · JPL
453118	2007 YV_{30}	—	December 28, 2007	Kitt Peak	Spacewatch	·	1.1 km	MPC · JPL
453119	2007 YG_{32}	—	November 5, 2007	Kitt Peak	Spacewatch	·	1.4 km	MPC · JPL
453120	2007 YK_{46}	—	December 30, 2007	Kitt Peak	Spacewatch	·	1.4 km	MPC · JPL
453121	2007 YA_{49}	—	December 28, 2007	Kitt Peak	Spacewatch	·	1.2 km	MPC · JPL
453122	2007 YG_{50}	—	December 28, 2007	Kitt Peak	Spacewatch	H	520 m	MPC · JPL
453123	2007 YQ_{57}	—	December 6, 2007	Mount Lemmon	Mount Lemmon Survey	H	610 m	MPC · JPL
453124	2007 YH_{62}	—	December 30, 2007	Kitt Peak	Spacewatch	·	1.7 km	MPC · JPL
453125	2007 YD_{67}	—	December 31, 2007	Kitt Peak	Spacewatch	EUN	930 m	MPC · JPL
453126	2007 YC_{74}	—	December 31, 2007	Catalina	CSS	H	690 m	MPC · JPL
453127	2008 AP_{2}	—	January 6, 2008	La Sagra	OAM	·	1.3 km	MPC · JPL
453128	2008 AU_{20}	—	January 10, 2008	Mount Lemmon	Mount Lemmon Survey	·	1.2 km	MPC · JPL
453129	2008 AU_{25}	—	January 10, 2008	Mount Lemmon	Mount Lemmon Survey	·	1.4 km	MPC · JPL
453130	2008 AG_{27}	—	December 18, 2007	Mount Lemmon	Mount Lemmon Survey	H	680 m	MPC · JPL
453131	2008 AT_{33}	—	December 18, 2007	Mount Lemmon	Mount Lemmon Survey	H	620 m	MPC · JPL
453132	2008 AL_{35}	—	December 31, 2007	Kitt Peak	Spacewatch	H	570 m	MPC · JPL
453133	2008 AD_{42}	—	January 10, 2008	Catalina	CSS	·	1.1 km	MPC · JPL
453134	2008 AM_{45}	—	January 10, 2008	Lulin	LUSS	·	1.4 km	MPC · JPL
453135	2008 AN_{46}	—	December 28, 2007	Kitt Peak	Spacewatch	·	1.3 km	MPC · JPL
453136	2008 AL_{54}	—	January 11, 2008	Kitt Peak	Spacewatch	·	1.2 km	MPC · JPL
453137	2008 AM_{55}	—	January 11, 2008	Kitt Peak	Spacewatch	·	1.1 km	MPC · JPL
453138	2008 AN_{65}	—	January 11, 2008	Mount Lemmon	Mount Lemmon Survey	·	940 m	MPC · JPL
453139	2008 AU_{76}	—	December 14, 2007	Mount Lemmon	Mount Lemmon Survey	·	1.4 km	MPC · JPL
453140	2008 AN_{86}	—	January 11, 2008	Kitt Peak	Spacewatch	ADE	1.7 km	MPC · JPL
453141	2008 AZ_{95}	—	January 14, 2008	Kitt Peak	Spacewatch	MAR	900 m	MPC · JPL
453142	2008 AG_{98}	—	January 14, 2008	Kitt Peak	Spacewatch	·	1.5 km	MPC · JPL
453143	2008 AN_{99}	—	January 14, 2008	Kitt Peak	Spacewatch	(5)	1.1 km	MPC · JPL
453144	2008 AG_{107}	—	January 15, 2008	Kitt Peak	Spacewatch	·	1.5 km	MPC · JPL
453145	2008 AX_{112}	—	January 13, 2008	Kitt Peak	Spacewatch	·	1.8 km	MPC · JPL
453146	2008 AG_{136}	—	January 12, 2008	Catalina	CSS	·	1.5 km	MPC · JPL
453147	2008 AQ_{137}	—	January 10, 2008	Mount Lemmon	Mount Lemmon Survey	·	1.1 km	MPC · JPL
453148	2008 BD_{27}	—	September 17, 2006	Kitt Peak	Spacewatch	·	1.1 km	MPC · JPL
453149	2008 BM_{30}	—	January 30, 2008	Mount Lemmon	Mount Lemmon Survey	·	1 km	MPC · JPL
453150	2008 BM_{37}	—	November 11, 2007	Mount Lemmon	Mount Lemmon Survey	·	1 km	MPC · JPL
453151	2008 BD_{50}	—	January 18, 2008	Kitt Peak	Spacewatch	·	1.9 km	MPC · JPL
453152	2008 CR_{8}	—	January 10, 2008	Kitt Peak	Spacewatch	AGN	1.3 km	MPC · JPL
453153	2008 CY_{18}	—	February 3, 2008	Kitt Peak	Spacewatch	·	1.4 km	MPC · JPL
453154	2008 CZ_{26}	—	February 2, 2008	Kitt Peak	Spacewatch	H	710 m	MPC · JPL
453155	2008 CD_{53}	—	February 7, 2008	Kitt Peak	Spacewatch	·	1.2 km	MPC · JPL
453156	2008 CC_{61}	—	February 7, 2008	Mount Lemmon	Mount Lemmon Survey	MIS	2.5 km	MPC · JPL
453157	2008 CH_{65}	—	November 19, 2007	Mount Lemmon	Mount Lemmon Survey	·	1.3 km	MPC · JPL
453158	2008 CE_{80}	—	February 7, 2008	Kitt Peak	Spacewatch	H	650 m	MPC · JPL
453159	2008 CH_{140}	—	February 8, 2008	Kitt Peak	Spacewatch	·	930 m	MPC · JPL
453160	2008 CD_{146}	—	February 9, 2008	Kitt Peak	Spacewatch	·	1.3 km	MPC · JPL
453161	2008 CS_{159}	—	February 9, 2008	Kitt Peak	Spacewatch	·	1.4 km	MPC · JPL
453162	2008 CH_{168}	—	February 11, 2008	Kitt Peak	Spacewatch	·	1.1 km	MPC · JPL
453163	2008 CP_{206}	—	October 16, 2006	Kitt Peak	Spacewatch	·	1.3 km	MPC · JPL
453164	2008 CB_{215}	—	February 12, 2008	Mount Lemmon	Mount Lemmon Survey	·	2.4 km	MPC · JPL
453165	2008 DU_{34}	—	February 9, 2008	Catalina	CSS	·	1.6 km	MPC · JPL
453166	2008 DE_{50}	—	January 11, 2008	Catalina	CSS	·	1.4 km	MPC · JPL
453167	2008 DN_{70}	—	February 18, 2008	Mount Lemmon	Mount Lemmon Survey	EUN	1.3 km	MPC · JPL
453168	2008 DU_{73}	—	February 13, 2008	Mount Lemmon	Mount Lemmon Survey	·	1.5 km	MPC · JPL
453169	2008 DS_{75}	—	February 28, 2008	Mount Lemmon	Mount Lemmon Survey	NEM	1.8 km	MPC · JPL
453170	2008 DW_{79}	—	February 29, 2008	Catalina	CSS	·	2.0 km	MPC · JPL
453171	2008 DO_{81}	—	February 27, 2008	Mount Lemmon	Mount Lemmon Survey	·	1.1 km	MPC · JPL
453172	2008 DN_{82}	—	February 28, 2008	Kitt Peak	Spacewatch	·	1.3 km	MPC · JPL
453173	2008 EA_{16}	—	February 2, 2008	Mount Lemmon	Mount Lemmon Survey	·	1.3 km	MPC · JPL
453174	2008 EE_{18}	—	March 1, 2008	Kitt Peak	Spacewatch	·	1.4 km	MPC · JPL
453175	2008 EX_{22}	—	January 8, 2003	Socorro	LINEAR	DOR	2.8 km	MPC · JPL
453176	2008 EY_{35}	—	January 31, 2008	Mount Lemmon	Mount Lemmon Survey	·	1.7 km	MPC · JPL
453177	2008 EF_{38}	—	March 4, 2008	Kitt Peak	Spacewatch	·	1.9 km	MPC · JPL
453178	2008 EU_{50}	—	February 11, 2008	Kitt Peak	Spacewatch	·	1.5 km	MPC · JPL
453179	2008 EA_{51}	—	March 6, 2008	Kitt Peak	Spacewatch	JUN	1.1 km	MPC · JPL
453180	2008 EJ_{64}	—	March 9, 2008	Mount Lemmon	Mount Lemmon Survey	(13314)	1.6 km	MPC · JPL
453181	2008 EQ_{72}	—	March 6, 2008	Mount Lemmon	Mount Lemmon Survey	·	1.4 km	MPC · JPL
453182	2008 EZ_{112}	—	March 8, 2008	Kitt Peak	Spacewatch	EUN	1.2 km	MPC · JPL
453183	2008 EL_{120}	—	March 1, 2008	Kitt Peak	Spacewatch	·	2.2 km	MPC · JPL
453184	2008 EM_{123}	—	March 9, 2008	Kitt Peak	Spacewatch	·	3.0 km	MPC · JPL
453185	2008 EP_{128}	—	December 16, 2007	Mount Lemmon	Mount Lemmon Survey	·	1.3 km	MPC · JPL
453186	2008 EQ_{134}	—	March 11, 2008	Kitt Peak	Spacewatch	MRX	860 m	MPC · JPL
453187	2008 EJ_{153}	—	March 11, 2008	Mount Lemmon	Mount Lemmon Survey	·	1.3 km	MPC · JPL
453188	2008 EK_{157}	—	March 15, 2008	Mount Lemmon	Mount Lemmon Survey	AGN	1.1 km	MPC · JPL
453189	2008 FT	—	February 27, 2008	Mount Lemmon	Mount Lemmon Survey	·	1.2 km	MPC · JPL
453190	2008 FR_{22}	—	March 27, 2008	Kitt Peak	Spacewatch	·	1.6 km	MPC · JPL
453191	2008 FM_{23}	—	March 27, 2008	Kitt Peak	Spacewatch	·	4.4 km	MPC · JPL
453192	2008 FC_{32}	—	March 28, 2008	Mount Lemmon	Mount Lemmon Survey	·	1.6 km	MPC · JPL
453193	2008 FL_{59}	—	March 29, 2008	Kitt Peak	Spacewatch	·	1.7 km	MPC · JPL
453194	2008 FR_{62}	—	January 10, 2008	Mount Lemmon	Mount Lemmon Survey	MIS	2.1 km	MPC · JPL
453195	2008 FB_{72}	—	March 30, 2008	Kitt Peak	Spacewatch	·	1.8 km	MPC · JPL
453196	2008 FP_{78}	—	March 27, 2008	Mount Lemmon	Mount Lemmon Survey	·	1.7 km	MPC · JPL
453197	2008 FR_{87}	—	March 12, 2008	Kitt Peak	Spacewatch	·	2.0 km	MPC · JPL
453198	2008 FW_{101}	—	March 30, 2008	Kitt Peak	Spacewatch	MRX	1.0 km	MPC · JPL
453199	2008 FR_{124}	—	March 30, 2008	Kitt Peak	Spacewatch	·	1.5 km	MPC · JPL
453200	2008 FV_{127}	—	March 27, 2008	Kitt Peak	Spacewatch	·	1.6 km	MPC · JPL

== 453201–453300 ==
back to top

Designation			Discovery			Properties		Ref
Permanent	Provisional	Named after	Date	Site	Discoverer(s)	Category	Diam.	Ref
453201	2008 FU_{135}	—	March 29, 2008	Kitt Peak	Spacewatch	L5	9.4 km	MPC · JPL
453202	2008 GY_{44}	—	April 4, 2008	Kitt Peak	Spacewatch	·	1.6 km	MPC · JPL
453203	2008 GG_{63}	—	April 5, 2008	Kitt Peak	Spacewatch	·	1.8 km	MPC · JPL
453204	2008 GV_{76}	—	April 7, 2008	Kitt Peak	Spacewatch	T_{j} (2.99)	3.1 km	MPC · JPL
453205	2008 GW_{80}	—	April 7, 2008	Mount Lemmon	Mount Lemmon Survey	EOS	1.6 km	MPC · JPL
453206	2008 GX_{105}	—	April 11, 2008	Mount Lemmon	Mount Lemmon Survey	HOF	2.9 km	MPC · JPL
453207	2008 GO_{115}	—	February 3, 2008	Catalina	CSS	·	1.2 km	MPC · JPL
453208	2008 GK_{120}	—	March 29, 2008	Catalina	CSS	·	2.6 km	MPC · JPL
453209	2008 GL_{123}	—	March 10, 2008	Kitt Peak	Spacewatch	AGN	980 m	MPC · JPL
453210	2008 GA_{128}	—	April 14, 2008	Mount Lemmon	Mount Lemmon Survey	·	2.0 km	MPC · JPL
453211	2008 GZ_{145}	—	April 14, 2008	Mount Lemmon	Mount Lemmon Survey	·	1.9 km	MPC · JPL
453212	2008 HU_{7}	—	April 24, 2008	Kitt Peak	Spacewatch	·	3.4 km	MPC · JPL
453213	2008 HK_{8}	—	April 24, 2008	Kitt Peak	Spacewatch	EOS	1.5 km	MPC · JPL
453214	2008 HU_{13}	—	April 25, 2008	Kitt Peak	Spacewatch	MAR	1.1 km	MPC · JPL
453215	2008 HP_{14}	—	March 11, 2008	Kitt Peak	Spacewatch	·	1.9 km	MPC · JPL
453216	2008 HQ_{17}	—	April 26, 2008	Kitt Peak	Spacewatch	·	3.2 km	MPC · JPL
453217	2008 HU_{22}	—	April 27, 2008	Kitt Peak	Spacewatch	·	1.1 km	MPC · JPL
453218	2008 HZ_{29}	—	March 15, 2008	Mount Lemmon	Mount Lemmon Survey	·	3.1 km	MPC · JPL
453219	2008 HK_{35}	—	November 26, 2005	Kitt Peak	Spacewatch	EOS	2.6 km	MPC · JPL
453220	2008 HN_{50}	—	April 14, 2008	Kitt Peak	Spacewatch	·	1.6 km	MPC · JPL
453221	2008 HG_{55}	—	April 29, 2008	Kitt Peak	Spacewatch	·	1.8 km	MPC · JPL
453222	2008 HQ_{68}	—	April 24, 2008	Kitt Peak	Spacewatch	·	3.3 km	MPC · JPL
453223	2008 HG_{69}	—	April 27, 2008	Kitt Peak	Spacewatch	L5	10 km	MPC · JPL
453224	2008 JX_{9}	—	April 14, 2008	Kitt Peak	Spacewatch	·	2.7 km	MPC · JPL
453225	2008 JS_{10}	—	April 3, 2008	Kitt Peak	Spacewatch	·	1.9 km	MPC · JPL
453226	2008 JU_{22}	—	April 6, 2008	Mount Lemmon	Mount Lemmon Survey	·	1.9 km	MPC · JPL
453227	2008 JW_{32}	—	April 6, 2008	Mount Lemmon	Mount Lemmon Survey	EUN	990 m	MPC · JPL
453228	2008 JZ_{40}	—	May 2, 2008	Catalina	CSS	·	2.9 km	MPC · JPL
453229	2008 KZ_{10}	—	May 29, 2008	Mount Lemmon	Mount Lemmon Survey	·	4.5 km	MPC · JPL
453230	2008 KJ_{13}	—	May 27, 2008	Kitt Peak	Spacewatch	L5	8.4 km	MPC · JPL
453231	2008 KH_{18}	—	May 11, 2008	Mount Lemmon	Mount Lemmon Survey	·	2.7 km	MPC · JPL
453232	2008 KV_{38}	—	May 12, 2008	Siding Spring	SSS	·	3.6 km	MPC · JPL
453233	2008 LK_{14}	—	June 8, 2008	Kitt Peak	Spacewatch	T_{j} (2.97)	3.9 km	MPC · JPL
453234	2008 OA_{20}	—	July 30, 2008	Kitt Peak	Spacewatch	·	800 m	MPC · JPL
453235	2008 PU_{3}	—	August 3, 2008	Marly	P. Kocher	·	500 m	MPC · JPL
453236	2008 PQ_{8}	—	July 26, 2008	Siding Spring	SSS	·	690 m	MPC · JPL
453237	2008 QP_{13}	—	August 27, 2008	La Sagra	OAM	·	770 m	MPC · JPL
453238	2008 QT_{17}	—	July 29, 2008	Kitt Peak	Spacewatch	·	590 m	MPC · JPL
453239	2008 RB_{31}	—	November 30, 2003	Kitt Peak	Spacewatch	·	2.4 km	MPC · JPL
453240	2008 RB_{52}	—	September 3, 2008	Kitt Peak	Spacewatch	·	490 m	MPC · JPL
453241	2008 RZ_{62}	—	September 4, 2008	Kitt Peak	Spacewatch	·	640 m	MPC · JPL
453242	2008 RG_{106}	—	September 7, 2008	Mount Lemmon	Mount Lemmon Survey	·	430 m	MPC · JPL
453243	2008 RB_{121}	—	September 4, 2008	Kitt Peak	Spacewatch	·	610 m	MPC · JPL
453244	2008 RB_{138}	—	September 5, 2008	Kitt Peak	Spacewatch	·	650 m	MPC · JPL
453245	2008 SV_{28}	—	September 19, 2008	Kitt Peak	Spacewatch	·	700 m	MPC · JPL
453246	2008 SJ_{29}	—	September 4, 2008	Kitt Peak	Spacewatch	·	820 m	MPC · JPL
453247	2008 SS_{31}	—	September 20, 2008	Kitt Peak	Spacewatch	·	630 m	MPC · JPL
453248	2008 SN_{38}	—	November 30, 2005	Mount Lemmon	Mount Lemmon Survey	·	590 m	MPC · JPL
453249	2008 SH_{43}	—	September 20, 2008	Mount Lemmon	Mount Lemmon Survey	·	640 m	MPC · JPL
453250	2008 SQ_{47}	—	September 20, 2008	Catalina	CSS	·	680 m	MPC · JPL
453251	2008 SU_{58}	—	September 20, 2008	Kitt Peak	Spacewatch	·	910 m	MPC · JPL
453252	2008 SN_{68}	—	September 21, 2008	Catalina	CSS	·	660 m	MPC · JPL
453253	2008 SK_{96}	—	September 9, 2008	Mount Lemmon	Mount Lemmon Survey	·	590 m	MPC · JPL
453254	2008 SL_{132}	—	September 22, 2008	Kitt Peak	Spacewatch	·	710 m	MPC · JPL
453255	2008 SD_{136}	—	September 23, 2008	Kitt Peak	Spacewatch	·	860 m	MPC · JPL
453256 Gucevičius	2008 SP_{139}	Gucevičius	September 23, 2008	Moletai	K. Černis, J. Zdanavičius	·	830 m	MPC · JPL
453257	2008 SE_{141}	—	September 24, 2008	Mount Lemmon	Mount Lemmon Survey	CYB	4.8 km	MPC · JPL
453258	2008 SY_{156}	—	September 24, 2008	Socorro	LINEAR	·	710 m	MPC · JPL
453259	2008 SQ_{162}	—	September 28, 2008	Socorro	LINEAR	·	580 m	MPC · JPL
453260	2008 SG_{181}	—	September 24, 2008	Kitt Peak	Spacewatch	·	550 m	MPC · JPL
453261	2008 SP_{190}	—	September 25, 2008	Mount Lemmon	Mount Lemmon Survey	·	470 m	MPC · JPL
453262	2008 SA_{196}	—	September 25, 2008	Kitt Peak	Spacewatch	V	470 m	MPC · JPL
453263	2008 SK_{201}	—	September 26, 2008	Kitt Peak	Spacewatch	·	650 m	MPC · JPL
453264	2008 SP_{231}	—	August 24, 2008	Kitt Peak	Spacewatch	·	830 m	MPC · JPL
453265	2008 SP_{237}	—	September 29, 2008	Mount Lemmon	Mount Lemmon Survey	·	520 m	MPC · JPL
453266	2008 SR_{241}	—	September 29, 2008	Catalina	CSS	·	580 m	MPC · JPL
453267	2008 SX_{241}	—	September 3, 2008	Kitt Peak	Spacewatch	·	540 m	MPC · JPL
453268	2008 SR_{252}	—	September 20, 2008	Kitt Peak	Spacewatch	·	570 m	MPC · JPL
453269	2008 SH_{273}	—	September 23, 2008	Mount Lemmon	Mount Lemmon Survey	NYS	900 m	MPC · JPL
453270	2008 SJ_{290}	—	September 29, 2008	Catalina	CSS	·	480 m	MPC · JPL
453271	2008 SN_{297}	—	September 23, 2008	Kitt Peak	Spacewatch	·	1.0 km	MPC · JPL
453272	2008 SJ_{300}	—	September 23, 2008	Kitt Peak	Spacewatch	·	610 m	MPC · JPL
453273	2008 SB_{305}	—	September 26, 2008	Kitt Peak	Spacewatch	·	620 m	MPC · JPL
453274	2008 SD_{310}	—	September 29, 2008	Mount Lemmon	Mount Lemmon Survey	V	570 m	MPC · JPL
453275	2008 TL_{12}	—	October 1, 2008	Kitt Peak	Spacewatch	·	570 m	MPC · JPL
453276	2008 TR_{20}	—	October 1, 2008	Mount Lemmon	Mount Lemmon Survey	V	480 m	MPC · JPL
453277	2008 TJ_{40}	—	October 1, 2008	Mount Lemmon	Mount Lemmon Survey	·	3.4 km	MPC · JPL
453278	2008 TY_{41}	—	October 1, 2008	Mount Lemmon	Mount Lemmon Survey	·	580 m	MPC · JPL
453279	2008 TD_{46}	—	September 23, 2008	Kitt Peak	Spacewatch	·	700 m	MPC · JPL
453280	2008 TY_{53}	—	October 2, 2008	Kitt Peak	Spacewatch	·	590 m	MPC · JPL
453281	2008 TZ_{72}	—	October 2, 2008	Kitt Peak	Spacewatch	·	670 m	MPC · JPL
453282	2008 TF_{75}	—	September 6, 2008	Mount Lemmon	Mount Lemmon Survey	·	680 m	MPC · JPL
453283	2008 TA_{89}	—	October 3, 2008	Kitt Peak	Spacewatch	·	560 m	MPC · JPL
453284	2008 TY_{90}	—	February 25, 2006	Mount Lemmon	Mount Lemmon Survey	NYS	690 m	MPC · JPL
453285	2008 TH_{91}	—	October 3, 2008	La Sagra	OAM	·	780 m	MPC · JPL
453286	2008 TR_{94}	—	September 22, 2008	Kitt Peak	Spacewatch	·	1.0 km	MPC · JPL
453287	2008 TH_{110}	—	October 6, 2008	Catalina	CSS	(2076)	660 m	MPC · JPL
453288	2008 TQ_{164}	—	October 1, 2008	Kitt Peak	Spacewatch	·	3.1 km	MPC · JPL
453289	2008 TX_{165}	—	October 6, 2008	Catalina	CSS	·	780 m	MPC · JPL
453290	2008 TX_{172}	—	October 10, 2008	Mount Lemmon	Mount Lemmon Survey	·	640 m	MPC · JPL
453291	2008 TA_{174}	—	October 2, 2008	Kitt Peak	Spacewatch	·	470 m	MPC · JPL
453292	2008 TM_{179}	—	October 1, 2008	Catalina	CSS	·	930 m	MPC · JPL
453293	2008 TZ_{187}	—	October 9, 2008	Kitt Peak	Spacewatch	·	3.5 km	MPC · JPL
453294	2008 UB_{11}	—	October 17, 2008	Kitt Peak	Spacewatch	·	620 m	MPC · JPL
453295	2008 UT_{69}	—	September 22, 2008	Kitt Peak	Spacewatch	·	710 m	MPC · JPL
453296	2008 UY_{96}	—	October 25, 2008	Socorro	LINEAR	·	730 m	MPC · JPL
453297	2008 UN_{105}	—	October 20, 2008	Kitt Peak	Spacewatch	·	530 m	MPC · JPL
453298	2008 UR_{109}	—	October 22, 2008	Kitt Peak	Spacewatch	·	730 m	MPC · JPL
453299	2008 UW_{142}	—	October 23, 2008	Kitt Peak	Spacewatch	·	1.1 km	MPC · JPL
453300	2008 UF_{179}	—	September 7, 2008	Mount Lemmon	Mount Lemmon Survey	V	780 m	MPC · JPL

== 453301–453400 ==
back to top

Designation			Discovery			Properties		Ref
Permanent	Provisional	Named after	Date	Site	Discoverer(s)	Category	Diam.	Ref
453301	2008 UH_{197}	—	October 27, 2008	Mount Lemmon	Mount Lemmon Survey	·	940 m	MPC · JPL
453302	2008 UR_{199}	—	October 31, 2008	Desert Moon	Stevens, B. L.	·	660 m	MPC · JPL
453303	2008 UH_{213}	—	October 24, 2008	Catalina	CSS	·	600 m	MPC · JPL
453304	2008 UZ_{223}	—	October 25, 2008	Kitt Peak	Spacewatch	PHO	2.4 km	MPC · JPL
453305	2008 UC_{284}	—	October 28, 2008	Mount Lemmon	Mount Lemmon Survey	·	560 m	MPC · JPL
453306	2008 UH_{284}	—	October 28, 2008	Mount Lemmon	Mount Lemmon Survey	·	470 m	MPC · JPL
453307	2008 UC_{336}	—	October 20, 2008	Kitt Peak	Spacewatch	·	650 m	MPC · JPL
453308	2008 UT_{359}	—	October 28, 2008	Kitt Peak	Spacewatch	·	710 m	MPC · JPL
453309	2008 VQ_{4}	—	November 4, 2008	Socorro	LINEAR	AMO	450 m	MPC · JPL
453310	2008 VC_{24}	—	November 1, 2008	Kitt Peak	Spacewatch	·	690 m	MPC · JPL
453311	2008 VA_{25}	—	September 24, 2008	Mount Lemmon	Mount Lemmon Survey	·	800 m	MPC · JPL
453312	2008 VH_{30}	—	October 21, 2008	Kitt Peak	Spacewatch	·	740 m	MPC · JPL
453313	2008 VA_{38}	—	November 2, 2008	Mount Lemmon	Mount Lemmon Survey	·	1.2 km	MPC · JPL
453314	2008 VB_{39}	—	October 29, 2008	Kitt Peak	Spacewatch	NYS	820 m	MPC · JPL
453315	2008 VG_{41}	—	October 26, 2008	Kitt Peak	Spacewatch	·	580 m	MPC · JPL
453316	2008 VJ_{49}	—	October 26, 2008	Kitt Peak	Spacewatch	·	720 m	MPC · JPL
453317	2008 VA_{60}	—	October 23, 2008	Kitt Peak	Spacewatch	·	990 m	MPC · JPL
453318	2008 VR_{67}	—	November 8, 2008	Kitt Peak	Spacewatch	·	650 m	MPC · JPL
453319	2008 VM_{77}	—	November 3, 2008	Mount Lemmon	Mount Lemmon Survey	·	820 m	MPC · JPL
453320	2008 WG_{11}	—	November 18, 2008	Catalina	CSS	NYS	730 m	MPC · JPL
453321	2008 WC_{18}	—	September 29, 2008	Mount Lemmon	Mount Lemmon Survey	·	620 m	MPC · JPL
453322	2008 WC_{37}	—	November 17, 2008	Kitt Peak	Spacewatch	·	540 m	MPC · JPL
453323	2008 WY_{40}	—	November 17, 2008	Kitt Peak	Spacewatch	·	780 m	MPC · JPL
453324	2008 WB_{77}	—	September 29, 2008	Mount Lemmon	Mount Lemmon Survey	V	620 m	MPC · JPL
453325	2008 WD_{79}	—	November 20, 2008	Kitt Peak	Spacewatch	·	590 m	MPC · JPL
453326	2008 WV_{126}	—	November 24, 2008	Mount Lemmon	Mount Lemmon Survey	·	1.1 km	MPC · JPL
453327	2008 WB_{130}	—	November 19, 2008	Kitt Peak	Spacewatch	·	870 m	MPC · JPL
453328	2008 XN_{20}	—	December 1, 2008	Kitt Peak	Spacewatch	·	700 m	MPC · JPL
453329	2008 XK_{47}	—	December 1, 2008	Mount Lemmon	Mount Lemmon Survey	·	960 m	MPC · JPL
453330	2008 XF_{54}	—	December 1, 2008	Kitt Peak	Spacewatch	·	1.1 km	MPC · JPL
453331	2008 YZ_{4}	—	December 4, 2008	Mount Lemmon	Mount Lemmon Survey	MAS	630 m	MPC · JPL
453332	2008 YA_{18}	—	December 21, 2008	Mount Lemmon	Mount Lemmon Survey	·	1.0 km	MPC · JPL
453333	2008 YY_{35}	—	October 9, 2008	Kitt Peak	Spacewatch	NYS	1.1 km	MPC · JPL
453334	2008 YZ_{35}	—	December 22, 2008	Kitt Peak	Spacewatch	·	870 m	MPC · JPL
453335	2008 YL_{37}	—	November 24, 2008	Mount Lemmon	Mount Lemmon Survey	·	960 m	MPC · JPL
453336	2008 YT_{39}	—	December 29, 2008	Mount Lemmon	Mount Lemmon Survey	V	520 m	MPC · JPL
453337	2008 YH_{48}	—	December 29, 2008	Mount Lemmon	Mount Lemmon Survey	·	600 m	MPC · JPL
453338	2008 YW_{58}	—	December 30, 2008	Kitt Peak	Spacewatch	·	630 m	MPC · JPL
453339	2008 YF_{71}	—	December 29, 2008	Mount Lemmon	Mount Lemmon Survey	·	2.1 km	MPC · JPL
453340	2008 YQ_{79}	—	December 30, 2008	Mount Lemmon	Mount Lemmon Survey	·	870 m	MPC · JPL
453341	2008 YU_{89}	—	December 21, 2008	Kitt Peak	Spacewatch	·	1.1 km	MPC · JPL
453342	2008 YZ_{94}	—	November 20, 2008	Mount Lemmon	Mount Lemmon Survey	·	1.1 km	MPC · JPL
453343	2008 YL_{106}	—	December 29, 2008	Kitt Peak	Spacewatch	·	1.1 km	MPC · JPL
453344	2008 YC_{107}	—	December 22, 2008	Kitt Peak	Spacewatch	·	950 m	MPC · JPL
453345	2008 YA_{109}	—	December 29, 2008	Kitt Peak	Spacewatch	V	680 m	MPC · JPL
453346	2008 YE_{114}	—	February 24, 2006	Kitt Peak	Spacewatch	·	780 m	MPC · JPL
453347	2008 YE_{124}	—	December 30, 2008	Kitt Peak	Spacewatch	·	830 m	MPC · JPL
453348	2008 YA_{125}	—	December 30, 2008	Kitt Peak	Spacewatch	MAS	670 m	MPC · JPL
453349	2008 YD_{134}	—	December 30, 2008	Kitt Peak	Spacewatch	·	1.6 km	MPC · JPL
453350	2008 YB_{136}	—	November 30, 2008	Mount Lemmon	Mount Lemmon Survey	NYS	1.1 km	MPC · JPL
453351	2008 YZ_{157}	—	December 30, 2008	Mount Lemmon	Mount Lemmon Survey	NYS	1.1 km	MPC · JPL
453352	2008 YX_{160}	—	December 31, 2008	Catalina	CSS	EUN	1.4 km	MPC · JPL
453353	2008 YJ_{164}	—	December 21, 2008	Kitt Peak	Spacewatch	·	1 km	MPC · JPL
453354	2008 YW_{165}	—	December 31, 2008	Mount Lemmon	Mount Lemmon Survey	MAS	860 m	MPC · JPL
453355	2009 AA_{7}	—	April 24, 2006	Kitt Peak	Spacewatch	·	890 m	MPC · JPL
453356	2009 AR_{13}	—	December 22, 2008	Kitt Peak	Spacewatch	·	740 m	MPC · JPL
453357	2009 AV_{13}	—	January 2, 2009	Mount Lemmon	Mount Lemmon Survey	·	640 m	MPC · JPL
453358	2009 AS_{25}	—	December 21, 2008	Kitt Peak	Spacewatch	·	920 m	MPC · JPL
453359	2009 AQ_{29}	—	December 22, 2008	Kitt Peak	Spacewatch	·	1.5 km	MPC · JPL
453360	2009 AK_{46}	—	January 15, 2009	Kitt Peak	Spacewatch	·	1.1 km	MPC · JPL
453361	2009 AP_{46}	—	December 22, 2008	Kitt Peak	Spacewatch	MAS	490 m	MPC · JPL
453362	2009 BO_{11}	—	December 5, 2008	Mount Lemmon	Mount Lemmon Survey	·	790 m	MPC · JPL
453363	2009 BC_{21}	—	January 2, 2009	Kitt Peak	Spacewatch	MAS	520 m	MPC · JPL
453364	2009 BE_{23}	—	January 17, 2009	Kitt Peak	Spacewatch	PHO	900 m	MPC · JPL
453365	2009 BC_{31}	—	January 2, 2009	Mount Lemmon	Mount Lemmon Survey	V	590 m	MPC · JPL
453366	2009 BF_{31}	—	January 2, 2009	Mount Lemmon	Mount Lemmon Survey	·	990 m	MPC · JPL
453367	2009 BA_{34}	—	January 2, 2009	Mount Lemmon	Mount Lemmon Survey	·	1.1 km	MPC · JPL
453368	2009 BZ_{41}	—	January 16, 2009	Kitt Peak	Spacewatch	·	1.1 km	MPC · JPL
453369	2009 BQ_{50}	—	January 2, 2009	Mount Lemmon	Mount Lemmon Survey	·	900 m	MPC · JPL
453370	2009 BA_{53}	—	January 16, 2009	Mount Lemmon	Mount Lemmon Survey	·	980 m	MPC · JPL
453371	2009 BN_{55}	—	January 16, 2009	Mount Lemmon	Mount Lemmon Survey	·	810 m	MPC · JPL
453372	2009 BN_{57}	—	January 20, 2009	Kitt Peak	Spacewatch	NYS	1.0 km	MPC · JPL
453373	2009 BJ_{74}	—	December 29, 2008	Catalina	CSS	·	2.7 km	MPC · JPL
453374	2009 BJ_{76}	—	January 2, 2009	Mount Lemmon	Mount Lemmon Survey	MAS	750 m	MPC · JPL
453375	2009 BL_{93}	—	January 25, 2009	Kitt Peak	Spacewatch	·	1.2 km	MPC · JPL
453376	2009 BZ_{95}	—	November 22, 2008	Mount Lemmon	Mount Lemmon Survey	ERI	1.6 km	MPC · JPL
453377	2009 BE_{115}	—	November 24, 2008	Mount Lemmon	Mount Lemmon Survey	·	1.2 km	MPC · JPL
453378	2009 BP_{117}	—	January 29, 2009	Mount Lemmon	Mount Lemmon Survey	CLA	1.5 km	MPC · JPL
453379	2009 BD_{122}	—	January 31, 2009	Kitt Peak	Spacewatch	EUN	1.4 km	MPC · JPL
453380	2009 BP_{122}	—	January 31, 2009	Kitt Peak	Spacewatch	NYS	1.0 km	MPC · JPL
453381	2009 BN_{126}	—	January 15, 2009	Kitt Peak	Spacewatch	MAS	600 m	MPC · JPL
453382	2009 BH_{138}	—	January 29, 2009	Kitt Peak	Spacewatch	MAS	550 m	MPC · JPL
453383	2009 BC_{166}	—	January 31, 2009	Kitt Peak	Spacewatch	MAS	610 m	MPC · JPL
453384	2009 BD_{180}	—	January 25, 2009	Kitt Peak	Spacewatch	MAS	600 m	MPC · JPL
453385	2009 BB_{189}	—	January 20, 2009	Catalina	CSS	·	1.1 km	MPC · JPL
453386	2009 CH_{1}	—	October 27, 2005	Catalina	CSS	H	630 m	MPC · JPL
453387	2009 CM_{2}	—	January 1, 2009	Mount Lemmon	Mount Lemmon Survey	·	820 m	MPC · JPL
453388	2009 CM_{29}	—	January 17, 2009	Kitt Peak	Spacewatch	MAS	720 m	MPC · JPL
453389	2009 CX_{30}	—	February 1, 2009	Kitt Peak	Spacewatch	·	1.1 km	MPC · JPL
453390	2009 CH_{32}	—	February 1, 2009	Kitt Peak	Spacewatch	NYS	870 m	MPC · JPL
453391	2009 CQ_{35}	—	December 29, 2008	Mount Lemmon	Mount Lemmon Survey	·	1.3 km	MPC · JPL
453392	2009 CB_{51}	—	February 14, 2009	La Sagra	OAM	·	1.9 km	MPC · JPL
453393	2009 CA_{58}	—	February 3, 2009	Mount Lemmon	Mount Lemmon Survey	·	1.2 km	MPC · JPL
453394	2009 DT_{23}	—	February 14, 2009	Kitt Peak	Spacewatch	·	1.1 km	MPC · JPL
453395	2009 DB_{25}	—	February 21, 2009	Mount Lemmon	Mount Lemmon Survey	3:2	5.0 km	MPC · JPL
453396	2009 DT_{28}	—	February 4, 2009	Mount Lemmon	Mount Lemmon Survey	MAR	900 m	MPC · JPL
453397	2009 DM_{32}	—	February 20, 2009	Kitt Peak	Spacewatch	·	1.0 km	MPC · JPL
453398	2009 DM_{51}	—	February 21, 2009	Kitt Peak	Spacewatch	·	1.0 km	MPC · JPL
453399	2009 DK_{112}	—	February 26, 2009	Catalina	CSS	·	910 m	MPC · JPL
453400	2009 DU_{112}	—	December 20, 2004	Mount Lemmon	Mount Lemmon Survey	MAS	690 m	MPC · JPL

== 453401–453500 ==
back to top

Designation			Discovery			Properties		Ref
Permanent	Provisional	Named after	Date	Site	Discoverer(s)	Category	Diam.	Ref
453401	2009 DZ_{139}	—	February 18, 2009	Socorro	LINEAR	·	680 m	MPC · JPL
453402	2009 DP_{142}	—	February 19, 2009	Kitt Peak	Spacewatch	·	830 m	MPC · JPL
453403	2009 ED_{15}	—	March 15, 2009	Kitt Peak	Spacewatch	NYS	1.1 km	MPC · JPL
453404	2009 EE_{15}	—	September 23, 2000	Socorro	LINEAR	·	1.4 km	MPC · JPL
453405	2009 FV_{21}	—	March 17, 2009	Catalina	CSS	·	1.3 km	MPC · JPL
453406	2009 FH_{56}	—	March 19, 2009	Siding Spring	SSS	PHO	1.3 km	MPC · JPL
453407	2009 FL_{58}	—	March 21, 2009	Mount Lemmon	Mount Lemmon Survey	·	1.2 km	MPC · JPL
453408	2009 FE_{74}	—	March 31, 2009	Catalina	CSS	·	1.0 km	MPC · JPL
453409	2009 FA_{77}	—	March 19, 2009	Kitt Peak	Spacewatch	·	1.1 km	MPC · JPL
453410	2009 GK_{2}	—	April 1, 2009	Catalina	CSS	·	2.9 km	MPC · JPL
453411	2009 GH_{3}	—	February 23, 2009	Siding Spring	SSS	·	1.9 km	MPC · JPL
453412	2009 HG_{15}	—	April 1, 2009	Kitt Peak	Spacewatch	·	1.1 km	MPC · JPL
453413	2009 HT_{24}	—	April 17, 2009	Kitt Peak	Spacewatch	·	3.3 km	MPC · JPL
453414	2009 HE_{49}	—	April 19, 2009	Kitt Peak	Spacewatch	·	2.4 km	MPC · JPL
453415	2009 HO_{57}	—	April 23, 2009	La Sagra	OAM	·	1.1 km	MPC · JPL
453416	2009 HK_{66}	—	April 23, 2009	Kitt Peak	Spacewatch	·	1.7 km	MPC · JPL
453417	2009 HM_{69}	—	April 22, 2009	Mount Lemmon	Mount Lemmon Survey	EUN	900 m	MPC · JPL
453418	2009 HE_{78}	—	April 24, 2009	Mount Lemmon	Mount Lemmon Survey	·	830 m	MPC · JPL
453419	2009 HP_{80}	—	April 28, 2009	Catalina	CSS	·	1.1 km	MPC · JPL
453420	2009 HB_{97}	—	April 23, 2009	Catalina	CSS	·	3.3 km	MPC · JPL
453421	2009 HP_{102}	—	April 23, 2009	Kitt Peak	Spacewatch	·	1.9 km	MPC · JPL
453422	2009 JV_{1}	—	February 20, 2009	Mount Lemmon	Mount Lemmon Survey	·	1.2 km	MPC · JPL
453423	2009 JB_{7}	—	May 13, 2009	Mount Lemmon	Mount Lemmon Survey	·	1.7 km	MPC · JPL
453424	2009 JM_{8}	—	May 13, 2009	Kitt Peak	Spacewatch	·	1.3 km	MPC · JPL
453425	2009 JO_{11}	—	May 15, 2009	Kitt Peak	Spacewatch	·	1.6 km	MPC · JPL
453426	2009 JV_{13}	—	May 1, 2009	Cerro Burek	Burek, Cerro	·	1.5 km	MPC · JPL
453427	2009 KO_{2}	—	April 20, 2009	Kitt Peak	Spacewatch	·	2.0 km	MPC · JPL
453428	2009 KA_{22}	—	May 16, 2009	Catalina	CSS	·	3.7 km	MPC · JPL
453429	2009 KW_{25}	—	May 17, 2009	Mount Lemmon	Mount Lemmon Survey	·	2.1 km	MPC · JPL
453430	2009 PU	—	August 2, 2009	Siding Spring	SSS	·	3.0 km	MPC · JPL
453431	2009 PP_{1}	—	June 23, 2009	Mount Lemmon	Mount Lemmon Survey	H	700 m	MPC · JPL
453432	2009 PQ_{8}	—	February 25, 2007	Mount Lemmon	Mount Lemmon Survey	·	3.9 km	MPC · JPL
453433	2009 PX_{8}	—	August 15, 2009	Catalina	CSS	·	3.3 km	MPC · JPL
453434	2009 QA_{6}	—	January 12, 2008	Catalina	CSS	H	680 m	MPC · JPL
453435	2009 QA_{12}	—	August 16, 2009	Kitt Peak	Spacewatch	·	3.7 km	MPC · JPL
453436	2009 QF_{15}	—	August 16, 2009	Kitt Peak	Spacewatch	·	2.7 km	MPC · JPL
453437	2009 QT_{29}	—	August 23, 2009	Bergisch Gladbach	W. Bickel	VER	2.7 km	MPC · JPL
453438	2009 QK_{30}	—	August 21, 2009	Socorro	LINEAR	·	2.3 km	MPC · JPL
453439	2009 QG_{44}	—	August 27, 2009	Kitt Peak	Spacewatch	·	1.5 km	MPC · JPL
453440	2009 QX_{48}	—	October 15, 2004	Mount Lemmon	Mount Lemmon Survey	THM	2.7 km	MPC · JPL
453441	2009 QL_{52}	—	August 16, 2009	Kitt Peak	Spacewatch	·	2.5 km	MPC · JPL
453442	2009 QH_{53}	—	August 16, 2009	Kitt Peak	Spacewatch	EOS	1.5 km	MPC · JPL
453443	2009 QN_{58}	—	August 20, 2009	Kitt Peak	Spacewatch	THM	1.8 km	MPC · JPL
453444	2009 QR_{62}	—	August 18, 2009	Kitt Peak	Spacewatch	·	2.1 km	MPC · JPL
453445	2009 RK_{5}	—	August 28, 2009	Catalina	CSS	·	4.8 km	MPC · JPL
453446	2009 RY_{8}	—	September 12, 2009	Kitt Peak	Spacewatch	·	2.3 km	MPC · JPL
453447	2009 RR_{11}	—	September 12, 2009	Kitt Peak	Spacewatch	THM	2.0 km	MPC · JPL
453448	2009 RA_{13}	—	September 12, 2009	Kitt Peak	Spacewatch	·	2.5 km	MPC · JPL
453449	2009 RC_{18}	—	September 12, 2009	Kitt Peak	Spacewatch	·	2.9 km	MPC · JPL
453450	2009 RQ_{32}	—	September 14, 2009	Catalina	CSS	·	3.0 km	MPC · JPL
453451	2009 RU_{40}	—	September 15, 2009	Kitt Peak	Spacewatch	·	3.0 km	MPC · JPL
453452	2009 RC_{45}	—	September 15, 2009	Kitt Peak	Spacewatch	·	2.9 km	MPC · JPL
453453	2009 RQ_{70}	—	September 12, 2009	Kitt Peak	Spacewatch	THM	1.7 km	MPC · JPL
453454	2009 RF_{75}	—	September 15, 2009	Catalina	CSS	·	2.5 km	MPC · JPL
453455	2009 SF_{13}	—	August 28, 2009	Kitt Peak	Spacewatch	·	2.2 km	MPC · JPL
453456	2009 SX_{24}	—	September 16, 2009	Kitt Peak	Spacewatch	·	2.1 km	MPC · JPL
453457	2009 ST_{26}	—	September 16, 2009	Kitt Peak	Spacewatch	·	2.8 km	MPC · JPL
453458	2009 ST_{55}	—	September 17, 2009	Kitt Peak	Spacewatch	VER	3.4 km	MPC · JPL
453459	2009 SE_{58}	—	July 3, 2003	Kitt Peak	Spacewatch	·	2.2 km	MPC · JPL
453460	2009 ST_{83}	—	September 18, 2009	Mount Lemmon	Mount Lemmon Survey	·	2.3 km	MPC · JPL
453461	2009 SJ_{98}	—	August 16, 2009	Catalina	CSS	·	4.3 km	MPC · JPL
453462	2009 SK_{100}	—	September 17, 2009	Mount Lemmon	Mount Lemmon Survey	·	2.8 km	MPC · JPL
453463	2009 SC_{111}	—	September 18, 2009	Kitt Peak	Spacewatch	·	1.7 km	MPC · JPL
453464	2009 SK_{111}	—	September 18, 2009	Kitt Peak	Spacewatch	·	2.5 km	MPC · JPL
453465	2009 SN_{114}	—	September 18, 2009	Kitt Peak	Spacewatch	·	2.2 km	MPC · JPL
453466	2009 SY_{118}	—	September 18, 2009	Kitt Peak	Spacewatch	·	1.9 km	MPC · JPL
453467	2009 SL_{148}	—	September 19, 2009	Kitt Peak	Spacewatch	·	1.8 km	MPC · JPL
453468	2009 SG_{160}	—	September 16, 2009	Kitt Peak	Spacewatch	·	2.0 km	MPC · JPL
453469	2009 SX_{161}	—	October 4, 2004	Kitt Peak	Spacewatch	·	2.3 km	MPC · JPL
453470	2009 SO_{174}	—	August 17, 2009	Kitt Peak	Spacewatch	·	2.8 km	MPC · JPL
453471	2009 SS_{188}	—	September 17, 2009	Kitt Peak	Spacewatch	·	2.9 km	MPC · JPL
453472	2009 SQ_{191}	—	September 22, 2009	Kitt Peak	Spacewatch	EOS	1.6 km	MPC · JPL
453473	2009 SJ_{208}	—	September 15, 2009	Kitt Peak	Spacewatch	·	2.1 km	MPC · JPL
453474	2009 SL_{208}	—	September 15, 2009	Kitt Peak	Spacewatch	·	3.3 km	MPC · JPL
453475	2009 SE_{213}	—	September 23, 2009	Kitt Peak	Spacewatch	·	1.7 km	MPC · JPL
453476	2009 SE_{214}	—	September 23, 2009	Kitt Peak	Spacewatch	·	2.3 km	MPC · JPL
453477	2009 SN_{216}	—	September 15, 2009	Kitt Peak	Spacewatch	·	2.1 km	MPC · JPL
453478	2009 SQ_{225}	—	September 25, 2009	La Sagra	OAM	·	3.4 km	MPC · JPL
453479	2009 SN_{235}	—	September 30, 2009	Mount Lemmon	Mount Lemmon Survey	T_{j} (2.97)	5.0 km	MPC · JPL
453480	2009 SU_{242}	—	September 29, 2009	Skylive	Tozzi, F.	·	3.9 km	MPC · JPL
453481	2009 SS_{249}	—	September 18, 2009	Kitt Peak	Spacewatch	HYG	3.1 km	MPC · JPL
453482	2009 SN_{254}	—	September 18, 2009	Kitt Peak	Spacewatch	·	2.9 km	MPC · JPL
453483	2009 SP_{258}	—	September 21, 2009	Mount Lemmon	Mount Lemmon Survey	·	2.7 km	MPC · JPL
453484	2009 SO_{275}	—	September 25, 2009	Kitt Peak	Spacewatch	THM	1.8 km	MPC · JPL
453485	2009 SM_{286}	—	September 21, 2009	Kitt Peak	Spacewatch	EOS	2.5 km	MPC · JPL
453486	2009 SN_{287}	—	September 25, 2009	Kitt Peak	Spacewatch	·	3.1 km	MPC · JPL
453487	2009 SS_{289}	—	September 17, 2009	Kitt Peak	Spacewatch	·	2.1 km	MPC · JPL
453488	2009 SN_{293}	—	September 26, 2009	Kitt Peak	Spacewatch	·	1.7 km	MPC · JPL
453489	2009 SF_{297}	—	August 18, 2009	Catalina	CSS	·	2.7 km	MPC · JPL
453490	2009 SJ_{309}	—	September 18, 2009	Mount Lemmon	Mount Lemmon Survey	·	1.4 km	MPC · JPL
453491	2009 SP_{327}	—	September 26, 2009	Kitt Peak	Spacewatch	·	2.5 km	MPC · JPL
453492	2009 SD_{341}	—	September 24, 2009	Mount Lemmon	Mount Lemmon Survey	·	3.7 km	MPC · JPL
453493	2009 SB_{342}	—	September 16, 2009	Kitt Peak	Spacewatch	EOS	1.7 km	MPC · JPL
453494	2009 SM_{342}	—	September 16, 2009	Mount Lemmon	Mount Lemmon Survey	·	1.8 km	MPC · JPL
453495	2009 SQ_{343}	—	September 17, 2009	Kitt Peak	Spacewatch	·	2.3 km	MPC · JPL
453496	2009 SQ_{350}	—	September 26, 2009	Kitt Peak	Spacewatch	·	2.3 km	MPC · JPL
453497	2009 SU_{350}	—	September 28, 2009	Mount Lemmon	Mount Lemmon Survey	·	2.7 km	MPC · JPL
453498	2009 TJ_{22}	—	September 26, 2009	Catalina	CSS	·	4.8 km	MPC · JPL
453499	2009 TR_{30}	—	September 26, 2009	Kitt Peak	Spacewatch	·	2.2 km	MPC · JPL
453500	2009 TY_{33}	—	October 9, 2009	Catalina	CSS	TIR	2.8 km	MPC · JPL

== 453501–453600 ==
back to top

Designation			Discovery			Properties		Ref
Permanent	Provisional	Named after	Date	Site	Discoverer(s)	Category	Diam.	Ref
453501	2009 TM_{34}	—	September 29, 2009	Mount Lemmon	Mount Lemmon Survey	·	4.0 km	MPC · JPL
453502	2009 US_{1}	—	October 16, 2009	Socorro	LINEAR	·	2.4 km	MPC · JPL
453503	2009 UJ_{6}	—	September 15, 2009	Kitt Peak	Spacewatch	·	1.8 km	MPC · JPL
453504	2009 UD_{8}	—	September 25, 2009	Kitt Peak	Spacewatch	·	2.6 km	MPC · JPL
453505	2009 UX_{54}	—	October 23, 2009	Kitt Peak	Spacewatch	·	2.9 km	MPC · JPL
453506	2009 UX_{55}	—	October 23, 2009	Mount Lemmon	Mount Lemmon Survey	·	3.0 km	MPC · JPL
453507	2009 UK_{58}	—	October 23, 2009	Mount Lemmon	Mount Lemmon Survey	HYG	2.3 km	MPC · JPL
453508	2009 UG_{69}	—	September 22, 2009	Mount Lemmon	Mount Lemmon Survey	·	2.8 km	MPC · JPL
453509	2009 UF_{72}	—	October 23, 2009	Mount Lemmon	Mount Lemmon Survey	·	4.2 km	MPC · JPL
453510	2009 UN_{77}	—	September 29, 2009	Mount Lemmon	Mount Lemmon Survey	·	2.3 km	MPC · JPL
453511	2009 UT_{106}	—	October 22, 2009	Mount Lemmon	Mount Lemmon Survey	THM	2.2 km	MPC · JPL
453512	2009 UO_{108}	—	October 23, 2009	Kitt Peak	Spacewatch	LIX	3.3 km	MPC · JPL
453513	2009 UM_{113}	—	March 24, 2006	Kitt Peak	Spacewatch	·	2.5 km	MPC · JPL
453514	2009 UD_{120}	—	October 14, 2009	Mount Lemmon	Mount Lemmon Survey	THM	1.9 km	MPC · JPL
453515	2009 UM_{122}	—	October 26, 2009	Mount Lemmon	Mount Lemmon Survey	CYB	4.6 km	MPC · JPL
453516	2009 UD_{130}	—	October 29, 2009	La Sagra	OAM	·	3.1 km	MPC · JPL
453517	2009 UE_{131}	—	October 16, 2009	Catalina	CSS	T_{j} (2.99)	4.0 km	MPC · JPL
453518	2009 UK_{143}	—	October 18, 2009	Mount Lemmon	Mount Lemmon Survey	·	2.2 km	MPC · JPL
453519	2009 UK_{149}	—	October 25, 2009	Kitt Peak	Spacewatch	·	3.1 km	MPC · JPL
453520	2009 UO_{153}	—	October 23, 2009	Mount Lemmon	Mount Lemmon Survey	·	3.4 km	MPC · JPL
453521	2009 VU_{1}	—	November 9, 2009	Catalina	CSS	·	3.1 km	MPC · JPL
453522	2009 VK_{5}	—	November 8, 2009	Catalina	CSS	TIR	3.2 km	MPC · JPL
453523	2009 VR_{17}	—	November 8, 2009	Mount Lemmon	Mount Lemmon Survey	·	2.2 km	MPC · JPL
453524	2009 VY_{29}	—	September 21, 2009	Mount Lemmon	Mount Lemmon Survey	EOS	2.2 km	MPC · JPL
453525	2009 VX_{54}	—	November 10, 2009	Kitt Peak	Spacewatch	·	3.2 km	MPC · JPL
453526	2009 VT_{55}	—	September 15, 2009	Kitt Peak	Spacewatch	THM	2.2 km	MPC · JPL
453527	2009 VG_{57}	—	October 23, 2009	Mount Lemmon	Mount Lemmon Survey	·	2.9 km	MPC · JPL
453528	2009 VT_{68}	—	November 9, 2009	Kitt Peak	Spacewatch	·	2.9 km	MPC · JPL
453529	2009 VF_{73}	—	September 16, 2009	Kitt Peak	Spacewatch	·	2.0 km	MPC · JPL
453530	2009 VW_{82}	—	September 27, 2009	Kitt Peak	Spacewatch	·	2.1 km	MPC · JPL
453531	2009 WG_{13}	—	November 16, 2009	Mount Lemmon	Mount Lemmon Survey	·	3.9 km	MPC · JPL
453532	2009 WF_{14}	—	November 16, 2009	Mount Lemmon	Mount Lemmon Survey	·	3.1 km	MPC · JPL
453533	2009 WP_{16}	—	November 9, 2009	Kitt Peak	Spacewatch	·	3.5 km	MPC · JPL
453534	2009 WF_{59}	—	November 16, 2009	Mount Lemmon	Mount Lemmon Survey	(3460)	2.5 km	MPC · JPL
453535	2009 WA_{60}	—	November 16, 2009	Mount Lemmon	Mount Lemmon Survey	VER	3.9 km	MPC · JPL
453536	2009 WT_{74}	—	February 25, 2006	Anderson Mesa	LONEOS	·	4.5 km	MPC · JPL
453537	2009 WH_{82}	—	November 19, 2009	Kitt Peak	Spacewatch	·	3.8 km	MPC · JPL
453538	2009 WE_{99}	—	October 24, 2009	Kitt Peak	Spacewatch	·	2.5 km	MPC · JPL
453539	2009 WM_{99}	—	August 21, 2008	Kitt Peak	Spacewatch	VER	2.4 km	MPC · JPL
453540	2009 WT_{124}	—	November 8, 2009	Kitt Peak	Spacewatch	·	2.5 km	MPC · JPL
453541	2009 WZ_{133}	—	October 21, 2009	Catalina	CSS	(31811)	3.2 km	MPC · JPL
453542	2009 WU_{152}	—	December 18, 2004	Mount Lemmon	Mount Lemmon Survey	·	3.2 km	MPC · JPL
453543	2009 WW_{159}	—	March 9, 2005	Catalina	CSS	·	3.0 km	MPC · JPL
453544	2009 WA_{178}	—	November 23, 2009	Mount Lemmon	Mount Lemmon Survey	·	2.8 km	MPC · JPL
453545	2009 WB_{178}	—	October 12, 2009	Mount Lemmon	Mount Lemmon Survey	·	3.9 km	MPC · JPL
453546	2009 WS_{181}	—	November 23, 2009	Mount Lemmon	Mount Lemmon Survey	·	5.3 km	MPC · JPL
453547	2009 WB_{186}	—	September 24, 2009	Catalina	CSS	·	4.7 km	MPC · JPL
453548	2009 WK_{186}	—	November 24, 2009	Mount Lemmon	Mount Lemmon Survey	VER	2.3 km	MPC · JPL
453549	2009 WH_{187}	—	October 24, 2009	Kitt Peak	Spacewatch	·	3.2 km	MPC · JPL
453550	2009 WV_{215}	—	October 29, 2009	Catalina	CSS	·	2.2 km	MPC · JPL
453551	2009 WV_{226}	—	September 18, 2009	Mount Lemmon	Mount Lemmon Survey	·	2.7 km	MPC · JPL
453552	2009 WH_{255}	—	November 19, 2009	Kitt Peak	Spacewatch	T_{j} (2.97)	4.2 km	MPC · JPL
453553	2009 WU_{258}	—	November 27, 2009	Mount Lemmon	Mount Lemmon Survey	·	3.3 km	MPC · JPL
453554	2009 XS_{9}	—	December 13, 2009	Socorro	LINEAR	·	3.9 km	MPC · JPL
453555	2009 YL_{5}	—	December 17, 2009	Mount Lemmon	Mount Lemmon Survey	·	5.1 km	MPC · JPL
453556	2009 YT_{7}	—	December 16, 2009	Kitt Peak	Spacewatch	·	2.8 km	MPC · JPL
453557	2009 YZ_{19}	—	December 26, 2009	Kitt Peak	Spacewatch	·	3.3 km	MPC · JPL
453558	2010 AD_{1}	—	November 9, 2009	Kitt Peak	Spacewatch	THB	3.7 km	MPC · JPL
453559	2010 AO_{43}	—	January 6, 2010	Mount Lemmon	Mount Lemmon Survey	·	4.5 km	MPC · JPL
453560	2010 AS_{73}	—	November 18, 2009	Kitt Peak	Spacewatch	·	5.3 km	MPC · JPL
453561	2010 AW_{80}	—	January 6, 2010	Kitt Peak	Spacewatch	·	3.7 km	MPC · JPL
453562	2010 AZ_{134}	—	September 19, 2009	Kitt Peak	Spacewatch	·	2.4 km	MPC · JPL
453563	2010 BB	—	January 16, 2010	Mount Lemmon	Mount Lemmon Survey	ATE · PHA	320 m	MPC · JPL
453564	2010 BV_{25}	—	October 15, 2009	Catalina	CSS	T_{j} (2.99)	5.1 km	MPC · JPL
453565	2010 BT_{67}	—	October 1, 2009	Mount Lemmon	Mount Lemmon Survey	·	3.9 km	MPC · JPL
453566	2010 CQ_{3}	—	February 5, 2010	Kitt Peak	Spacewatch	·	560 m	MPC · JPL
453567	2010 CK_{36}	—	March 10, 2000	Kitt Peak	Spacewatch	·	680 m	MPC · JPL
453568	2010 CZ_{106}	—	February 14, 2010	Mount Lemmon	Mount Lemmon Survey	·	610 m	MPC · JPL
453569	2010 CN_{137}	—	February 6, 2010	Mount Lemmon	Mount Lemmon Survey	·	620 m	MPC · JPL
453570	2010 DJ_{6}	—	January 12, 2010	Mount Lemmon	Mount Lemmon Survey	·	1.2 km	MPC · JPL
453571	2010 EZ_{12}	—	December 11, 2009	Mount Lemmon	Mount Lemmon Survey	·	4.1 km	MPC · JPL
453572	2010 EH_{74}	—	February 9, 2010	Kitt Peak	Spacewatch	·	810 m	MPC · JPL
453573	2010 FN_{9}	—	March 19, 2010	Desert Moon	Stevens, B. L.	·	1.1 km	MPC · JPL
453574	2010 FB_{29}	—	March 22, 2010	Sierra Stars	Stars, Sierra	·	2.2 km	MPC · JPL
453575	2010 FE_{87}	—	March 26, 2010	Kitt Peak	Spacewatch	·	1.0 km	MPC · JPL
453576	2010 GV_{5}	—	March 12, 2010	Kitt Peak	Spacewatch	·	660 m	MPC · JPL
453577	2010 GU_{65}	—	March 16, 2010	Mount Lemmon	Mount Lemmon Survey	·	750 m	MPC · JPL
453578	2010 GF_{127}	—	September 5, 2007	Catalina	CSS	·	1.4 km	MPC · JPL
453579	2010 GR_{140}	—	October 6, 2004	Kitt Peak	Spacewatch	·	950 m	MPC · JPL
453580	2010 HV_{37}	—	April 21, 2010	WISE	WISE	·	2.1 km	MPC · JPL
453581	2010 HQ_{54}	—	March 3, 2005	Kitt Peak	Spacewatch	·	2.8 km	MPC · JPL
453582	2010 HK_{61}	—	April 26, 2010	WISE	WISE	·	2.3 km	MPC · JPL
453583	2010 HG_{71}	—	April 27, 2010	WISE	WISE	·	3.8 km	MPC · JPL
453584	2010 HK_{79}	—	March 12, 2010	Kitt Peak	Spacewatch	ERI	1.3 km	MPC · JPL
453585	2010 HX_{97}	—	April 30, 2010	WISE	WISE	·	1.9 km	MPC · JPL
453586	2010 JD_{72}	—	April 15, 2010	Kitt Peak	Spacewatch	·	1.1 km	MPC · JPL
453587	2010 JO_{91}	—	May 10, 2010	WISE	WISE	·	2.9 km	MPC · JPL
453588	2010 JM_{94}	—	May 10, 2010	WISE	WISE	·	2.1 km	MPC · JPL
453589	2010 JP_{118}	—	May 11, 2010	Mount Lemmon	Mount Lemmon Survey	NYS	1.1 km	MPC · JPL
453590	2010 JT_{131}	—	May 13, 2010	WISE	WISE	·	2.8 km	MPC · JPL
453591	2010 KL_{21}	—	September 7, 2004	Kitt Peak	Spacewatch	·	1.7 km	MPC · JPL
453592	2010 KK_{57}	—	May 20, 2010	WISE	WISE	EUN	1.7 km	MPC · JPL
453593	2010 LH_{1}	—	June 2, 2010	Kitt Peak	Spacewatch	·	1.4 km	MPC · JPL
453594	2010 LP_{51}	—	June 8, 2010	WISE	WISE	·	1.8 km	MPC · JPL
453595	2010 LN_{74}	—	June 10, 2010	WISE	WISE	·	1.6 km	MPC · JPL
453596	2010 LT_{101}	—	June 13, 2010	WISE	WISE	·	2.4 km	MPC · JPL
453597	2010 MA_{8}	—	June 16, 2010	WISE	WISE	DOR	2.8 km	MPC · JPL
453598	2010 MW_{84}	—	June 27, 2010	WISE	WISE	·	3.0 km	MPC · JPL
453599	2010 MA_{99}	—	June 29, 2010	WISE	WISE	·	2.2 km	MPC · JPL
453600	2010 MS_{106}	—	June 30, 2010	WISE	WISE	·	2.7 km	MPC · JPL

== 453601–453700 ==
back to top

Designation			Discovery			Properties		Ref
Permanent	Provisional	Named after	Date	Site	Discoverer(s)	Category	Diam.	Ref
453601	2010 NF	—	July 4, 2010	Mount Lemmon	Mount Lemmon Survey	·	1.9 km	MPC · JPL
453602	2010 NE_{3}	—	March 11, 2007	Mount Lemmon	Mount Lemmon Survey	·	3.9 km	MPC · JPL
453603	2010 NK_{3}	—	July 4, 2010	Kitt Peak	Spacewatch	·	1.8 km	MPC · JPL
453604	2010 NW_{3}	—	July 4, 2010	Kitt Peak	Spacewatch	EUN	1.2 km	MPC · JPL
453605	2010 NZ_{5}	—	July 5, 2010	Kitt Peak	Spacewatch	·	1.4 km	MPC · JPL
453606	2010 NX_{11}	—	July 5, 2010	WISE	WISE	·	2.2 km	MPC · JPL
453607	2010 NM_{17}	—	July 6, 2010	WISE	WISE	HOF	2.3 km	MPC · JPL
453608	2010 NC_{75}	—	November 6, 2005	Kitt Peak	Spacewatch	·	3.5 km	MPC · JPL
453609	2010 NH_{112}	—	July 13, 2010	WISE	WISE	·	2.2 km	MPC · JPL
453610	2010 OY_{54}	—	July 23, 2010	WISE	WISE	·	3.9 km	MPC · JPL
453611	2010 OX_{59}	—	July 23, 2010	WISE	WISE	·	3.1 km	MPC · JPL
453612	2010 OR_{88}	—	October 31, 2005	Kitt Peak	Spacewatch	·	3.2 km	MPC · JPL
453613	2010 OL_{93}	—	July 27, 2010	WISE	WISE	·	2.4 km	MPC · JPL
453614	2010 OL_{126}	—	February 1, 2009	Mount Lemmon	Mount Lemmon Survey	PHO	1.3 km	MPC · JPL
453615	2010 PO_{9}	—	August 3, 2010	Socorro	LINEAR	·	1.5 km	MPC · JPL
453616	2010 PS_{9}	—	August 4, 2010	Socorro	LINEAR	(5)	980 m	MPC · JPL
453617	2010 PV_{58}	—	February 9, 2008	Mount Lemmon	Mount Lemmon Survey	·	2.1 km	MPC · JPL
453618	2010 PE_{61}	—	August 10, 2010	Kitt Peak	Spacewatch	·	1.8 km	MPC · JPL
453619	2010 RD_{3}	—	February 9, 2008	Mount Lemmon	Mount Lemmon Survey	·	2.0 km	MPC · JPL
453620	2010 RM_{5}	—	August 10, 2010	Kitt Peak	Spacewatch	·	1.3 km	MPC · JPL
453621	2010 RH_{22}	—	October 23, 2006	Catalina	CSS	ADE	2.1 km	MPC · JPL
453622	2010 RS_{39}	—	September 2, 2010	La Sagra	OAM	·	2.3 km	MPC · JPL
453623	2010 RN_{61}	—	September 6, 2010	Kitt Peak	Spacewatch	EOS	1.5 km	MPC · JPL
453624	2010 RB_{80}	—	November 9, 1993	Kitt Peak	Spacewatch	·	1.4 km	MPC · JPL
453625	2010 RQ_{103}	—	March 9, 2003	Kitt Peak	Spacewatch	(18466)	2.2 km	MPC · JPL
453626	2010 RC_{111}	—	September 11, 2010	Kitt Peak	Spacewatch	EUN	1.3 km	MPC · JPL
453627	2010 RX_{173}	—	March 6, 2008	Mount Lemmon	Mount Lemmon Survey	·	1.8 km	MPC · JPL
453628	2010 SV_{5}	—	September 16, 2010	Mount Lemmon	Mount Lemmon Survey	·	1.7 km	MPC · JPL
453629	2010 SV_{9}	—	March 5, 2008	Mount Lemmon	Mount Lemmon Survey	·	1.6 km	MPC · JPL
453630	2010 SM_{20}	—	September 19, 2001	Kitt Peak	Spacewatch	·	1.6 km	MPC · JPL
453631	2010 SE_{33}	—	April 13, 2004	Kitt Peak	Spacewatch	·	1.5 km	MPC · JPL
453632	2010 SX_{35}	—	June 7, 2010	WISE	WISE	·	1.5 km	MPC · JPL
453633	2010 TF_{4}	—	November 27, 2006	Kitt Peak	Spacewatch	·	1.6 km	MPC · JPL
453634	2010 TT_{8}	—	October 7, 2005	Kitt Peak	Spacewatch	·	2.1 km	MPC · JPL
453635	2010 TD_{14}	—	December 15, 2006	Kitt Peak	Spacewatch	·	1.3 km	MPC · JPL
453636	2010 TY_{14}	—	October 17, 2006	Kitt Peak	Spacewatch	·	1.2 km	MPC · JPL
453637	2010 TQ_{16}	—	September 11, 2001	Socorro	LINEAR	·	1.7 km	MPC · JPL
453638	2010 TT_{16}	—	September 1, 2005	Kitt Peak	Spacewatch	·	1.9 km	MPC · JPL
453639	2010 TH_{17}	—	September 16, 2010	Kitt Peak	Spacewatch	·	1.3 km	MPC · JPL
453640	2010 TU_{31}	—	September 9, 2010	Kitt Peak	Spacewatch	·	1.5 km	MPC · JPL
453641	2010 TC_{33}	—	September 10, 2010	Kitt Peak	Spacewatch	AST	1.3 km	MPC · JPL
453642	2010 TE_{33}	—	March 29, 2008	Mount Lemmon	Mount Lemmon Survey	·	1.6 km	MPC · JPL
453643	2010 TM_{40}	—	December 13, 2006	Kitt Peak	Spacewatch	AGN	940 m	MPC · JPL
453644	2010 TA_{67}	—	February 28, 2008	Mount Lemmon	Mount Lemmon Survey	·	1.7 km	MPC · JPL
453645	2010 TA_{70}	—	September 14, 2010	Kitt Peak	Spacewatch	·	1.3 km	MPC · JPL
453646	2010 TW_{70}	—	September 14, 2010	Kitt Peak	Spacewatch	AGN	850 m	MPC · JPL
453647	2010 TU_{85}	—	May 30, 2009	Mount Lemmon	Mount Lemmon Survey	·	1.3 km	MPC · JPL
453648	2010 TE_{94}	—	October 1, 2010	Kitt Peak	Spacewatch	·	1.3 km	MPC · JPL
453649	2010 TN_{96}	—	September 4, 2010	Kitt Peak	Spacewatch	·	1.5 km	MPC · JPL
453650	2010 TD_{103}	—	October 1, 2005	Mount Lemmon	Mount Lemmon Survey	EOS	1.5 km	MPC · JPL
453651	2010 TW_{103}	—	December 21, 2006	Kitt Peak	Spacewatch	·	1.4 km	MPC · JPL
453652	2010 TW_{113}	—	July 12, 2005	Mount Lemmon	Mount Lemmon Survey	·	1.3 km	MPC · JPL
453653	2010 TH_{119}	—	October 9, 2010	Kitt Peak	Spacewatch	·	1.5 km	MPC · JPL
453654	2010 TU_{121}	—	April 4, 2008	Kitt Peak	Spacewatch	·	2.4 km	MPC · JPL
453655	2010 TV_{123}	—	April 1, 2008	Kitt Peak	Spacewatch	·	1.9 km	MPC · JPL
453656	2010 TZ_{123}	—	August 30, 2005	Kitt Peak	Spacewatch	KOR	1.1 km	MPC · JPL
453657	2010 TX_{140}	—	September 28, 1994	Kitt Peak	Spacewatch	·	1.7 km	MPC · JPL
453658	2010 TA_{146}	—	October 11, 2010	Mount Lemmon	Mount Lemmon Survey	·	1.3 km	MPC · JPL
453659	2010 TC_{148}	—	October 2, 2010	Kitt Peak	Spacewatch	·	1.3 km	MPC · JPL
453660	2010 TZ_{150}	—	September 17, 2010	Mount Lemmon	Mount Lemmon Survey	·	2.2 km	MPC · JPL
453661	2010 TX_{162}	—	October 7, 2005	Kitt Peak	Spacewatch	KOR	1.2 km	MPC · JPL
453662	2010 TL_{188}	—	October 2, 2010	Mount Lemmon	Mount Lemmon Survey	·	4.1 km	MPC · JPL
453663	2010 UQ_{5}	—	December 14, 2001	Socorro	LINEAR	·	1.7 km	MPC · JPL
453664	2010 UB_{16}	—	April 15, 2007	Kitt Peak	Spacewatch	EOS	1.9 km	MPC · JPL
453665	2010 UR_{48}	—	August 12, 2010	Kitt Peak	Spacewatch	DOR	2.8 km	MPC · JPL
453666	2010 UQ_{50}	—	October 31, 2010	Mount Lemmon	Mount Lemmon Survey	·	2.0 km	MPC · JPL
453667	2010 UC_{61}	—	October 30, 2010	Kitt Peak	Spacewatch	·	2.8 km	MPC · JPL
453668	2010 UB_{81}	—	October 31, 2010	Kitt Peak	Spacewatch	·	1.9 km	MPC · JPL
453669	2010 UY_{107}	—	December 1, 2006	Mount Lemmon	Mount Lemmon Survey	EUN	1.3 km	MPC · JPL
453670	2010 VW_{12}	—	December 21, 2006	Kitt Peak	Spacewatch	·	1.7 km	MPC · JPL
453671	2010 VM_{19}	—	November 2, 2010	Kitt Peak	Spacewatch	·	1.6 km	MPC · JPL
453672	2010 VA_{24}	—	November 12, 1999	Socorro	LINEAR	·	2.6 km	MPC · JPL
453673	2010 VY_{28}	—	December 8, 2005	Catalina	CSS	T_{j} (2.99)	4.8 km	MPC · JPL
453674	2010 VR_{31}	—	October 27, 2005	Mount Lemmon	Mount Lemmon Survey	·	1.8 km	MPC · JPL
453675	2010 VG_{38}	—	January 17, 2007	Kitt Peak	Spacewatch	AGN	1.2 km	MPC · JPL
453676	2010 VZ_{42}	—	October 17, 2010	Mount Lemmon	Mount Lemmon Survey	·	1.4 km	MPC · JPL
453677	2010 VQ_{81}	—	November 3, 2010	Kitt Peak	Spacewatch	·	2.3 km	MPC · JPL
453678	2010 VL_{105}	—	October 28, 2010	Mount Lemmon	Mount Lemmon Survey	·	1.9 km	MPC · JPL
453679	2010 VS_{138}	—	November 1, 2010	Kitt Peak	Spacewatch	·	2.3 km	MPC · JPL
453680	2010 VJ_{141}	—	October 17, 2010	Mount Lemmon	Mount Lemmon Survey	·	2.0 km	MPC · JPL
453681	2010 VS_{147}	—	November 10, 1999	Kitt Peak	Spacewatch	EOS	1.5 km	MPC · JPL
453682	2010 VF_{150}	—	December 3, 2005	Kitt Peak	Spacewatch	·	1.6 km	MPC · JPL
453683	2010 VU_{152}	—	November 7, 2010	Kitt Peak	Spacewatch	·	3.0 km	MPC · JPL
453684	2010 VE_{161}	—	October 28, 2005	Mount Lemmon	Mount Lemmon Survey	·	1.6 km	MPC · JPL
453685	2010 VZ_{175}	—	October 7, 2004	Kitt Peak	Spacewatch	·	3.3 km	MPC · JPL
453686	2010 VR_{188}	—	November 5, 2010	Kitt Peak	Spacewatch	·	1.7 km	MPC · JPL
453687	2010 VY_{190}	—	May 17, 2010	WISE	WISE	AMO	950 m	MPC · JPL
453688	2010 VD_{193}	—	November 3, 2010	Mount Lemmon	Mount Lemmon Survey	·	2.8 km	MPC · JPL
453689	2010 VH_{204}	—	October 30, 2010	Mount Lemmon	Mount Lemmon Survey	BRA	1.6 km	MPC · JPL
453690	2010 VB_{205}	—	October 28, 2010	Mount Lemmon	Mount Lemmon Survey	·	3.7 km	MPC · JPL
453691	2010 VF_{218}	—	October 12, 2010	Mount Lemmon	Mount Lemmon Survey	GEF	1.2 km	MPC · JPL
453692	2010 VG_{219}	—	November 17, 2001	Kitt Peak	Spacewatch	GEF	820 m	MPC · JPL
453693	2010 WT_{12}	—	April 12, 2008	Kitt Peak	Spacewatch	·	4.2 km	MPC · JPL
453694	2010 WS_{21}	—	November 10, 2010	Mount Lemmon	Mount Lemmon Survey	·	2.9 km	MPC · JPL
453695	2010 WY_{25}	—	November 1, 2010	Kitt Peak	Spacewatch	·	2.1 km	MPC · JPL
453696	2010 WY_{42}	—	October 29, 2010	Mount Lemmon	Mount Lemmon Survey	·	2.6 km	MPC · JPL
453697	2010 WF_{46}	—	October 28, 2010	Kitt Peak	Spacewatch	·	3.5 km	MPC · JPL
453698	2010 WP_{52}	—	November 10, 2010	Mount Lemmon	Mount Lemmon Survey	EOS	1.9 km	MPC · JPL
453699	2010 WQ_{62}	—	November 3, 2005	Kitt Peak	Spacewatch	HOF	2.6 km	MPC · JPL
453700	2010 WN_{64}	—	November 6, 2010	Kitt Peak	Spacewatch	·	2.6 km	MPC · JPL

== 453701–453800 ==
back to top

Designation			Discovery			Properties		Ref
Permanent	Provisional	Named after	Date	Site	Discoverer(s)	Category	Diam.	Ref
453701	2010 WH_{65}	—	June 6, 2002	Socorro	LINEAR	H	600 m	MPC · JPL
453702	2010 XH_{28}	—	December 1, 2010	Mount Lemmon	Mount Lemmon Survey	H	660 m	MPC · JPL
453703	2010 XA_{38}	—	October 14, 2010	Mount Lemmon	Mount Lemmon Survey	·	2.4 km	MPC · JPL
453704	2010 XY_{42}	—	November 28, 2010	Catalina	CSS	·	1.6 km	MPC · JPL
453705	2010 XB_{51}	—	November 12, 2010	Mount Lemmon	Mount Lemmon Survey	NAE	3.0 km	MPC · JPL
453706	2010 XK_{58}	—	December 4, 2010	Catalina	CSS	·	3.6 km	MPC · JPL
453707	2010 XY_{72}	—	December 15, 2010	Mount Lemmon	Mount Lemmon Survey	APO · PHA	500 m	MPC · JPL
453708	2010 XN_{78}	—	December 25, 2005	Kitt Peak	Spacewatch	·	1.6 km	MPC · JPL
453709	2010 YG	—	January 5, 2000	Socorro	LINEAR	·	3.3 km	MPC · JPL
453710	2010 YC_{5}	—	April 22, 2007	Kitt Peak	Spacewatch	EOS	2.0 km	MPC · JPL
453711	2011 AT_{5}	—	November 16, 2009	Mount Lemmon	Mount Lemmon Survey	·	2.4 km	MPC · JPL
453712	2011 AE_{7}	—	September 27, 2009	Kitt Peak	Spacewatch	·	2.2 km	MPC · JPL
453713	2011 AT_{7}	—	January 2, 2011	Mount Lemmon	Mount Lemmon Survey	·	2.5 km	MPC · JPL
453714	2011 AF_{10}	—	December 6, 2010	Mount Lemmon	Mount Lemmon Survey	·	3.3 km	MPC · JPL
453715 Blakesullivan	2011 AZ_{11}	Blakesullivan	January 5, 2011	Catalina	CSS	·	3.1 km	MPC · JPL
453716	2011 AO_{12}	—	February 1, 2006	Mount Lemmon	Mount Lemmon Survey	·	2.0 km	MPC · JPL
453717	2011 AR_{32}	—	October 9, 2004	Kitt Peak	Spacewatch	·	1.3 km	MPC · JPL
453718	2011 AZ_{40}	—	January 10, 2011	Mount Lemmon	Mount Lemmon Survey	·	2.5 km	MPC · JPL
453719	2011 AU_{43}	—	January 17, 2010	WISE	WISE	·	3.6 km	MPC · JPL
453720	2011 AP_{58}	—	December 13, 2010	Mount Lemmon	Mount Lemmon Survey	VER	2.4 km	MPC · JPL
453721	2011 AA_{65}	—	January 3, 2011	Mount Lemmon	Mount Lemmon Survey	·	2.7 km	MPC · JPL
453722	2011 AB_{75}	—	September 19, 2007	Catalina	CSS	H	690 m	MPC · JPL
453723	2011 AZ_{77}	—	January 26, 2006	Catalina	CSS	H	560 m	MPC · JPL
453724	2011 BC_{2}	—	January 5, 2000	Kitt Peak	Spacewatch	THM	1.6 km	MPC · JPL
453725	2011 BA_{4}	—	December 13, 2010	Mount Lemmon	Mount Lemmon Survey	·	2.8 km	MPC · JPL
453726	2011 BU_{8}	—	January 16, 2011	Mount Lemmon	Mount Lemmon Survey	·	3.3 km	MPC · JPL
453727	2011 BC_{9}	—	December 15, 2004	Kitt Peak	Spacewatch	·	2.2 km	MPC · JPL
453728	2011 BL_{11}	—	January 24, 2011	Catalina	CSS	·	3.1 km	MPC · JPL
453729	2011 BO_{24}	—	April 25, 2008	Mount Lemmon	Mount Lemmon Survey	APO · PHA	610 m	MPC · JPL
453730	2011 BE_{43}	—	February 9, 2010	WISE	WISE	·	4.9 km	MPC · JPL
453731	2011 BH_{54}	—	January 12, 2011	Mount Lemmon	Mount Lemmon Survey	·	3.0 km	MPC · JPL
453732	2011 BN_{55}	—	December 13, 2010	Mount Lemmon	Mount Lemmon Survey	·	2.1 km	MPC · JPL
453733	2011 BP_{64}	—	February 26, 2006	Anderson Mesa	LONEOS	·	3.3 km	MPC · JPL
453734	2011 BG_{67}	—	March 5, 2006	Kitt Peak	Spacewatch	·	1.8 km	MPC · JPL
453735	2011 BJ_{67}	—	October 21, 2009	Mount Lemmon	Mount Lemmon Survey	·	3.2 km	MPC · JPL
453736	2011 BJ_{93}	—	January 28, 2011	Mount Lemmon	Mount Lemmon Survey	EOS	2.3 km	MPC · JPL
453737	2011 BM_{117}	—	November 15, 2010	Mount Lemmon	Mount Lemmon Survey	·	2.8 km	MPC · JPL
453738	2011 BB_{125}	—	January 14, 2011	Mount Lemmon	Mount Lemmon Survey	·	2.5 km	MPC · JPL
453739	2011 BD_{125}	—	December 30, 2005	Kitt Peak	Spacewatch	·	1.9 km	MPC · JPL
453740	2011 BD_{135}	—	January 14, 2011	Mount Lemmon	Mount Lemmon Survey	·	2.3 km	MPC · JPL
453741	2011 BQ_{141}	—	January 14, 2011	Kitt Peak	Spacewatch	·	2.8 km	MPC · JPL
453742	2011 BT_{143}	—	January 29, 2011	Kitt Peak	Spacewatch	·	1.8 km	MPC · JPL
453743	2011 BO_{161}	—	November 19, 2004	Catalina	CSS	·	2.8 km	MPC · JPL
453744	2011 BB_{162}	—	January 10, 2011	Kitt Peak	Spacewatch	LIX	3.0 km	MPC · JPL
453745	2011 CK_{10}	—	January 11, 2011	Catalina	CSS	·	1.9 km	MPC · JPL
453746	2011 CM_{11}	—	January 5, 2000	Kitt Peak	Spacewatch	EOS	1.9 km	MPC · JPL
453747	2011 CU_{27}	—	November 8, 2009	Mount Lemmon	Mount Lemmon Survey	THM	2.3 km	MPC · JPL
453748	2011 CC_{36}	—	January 30, 2006	Kitt Peak	Spacewatch	·	2.4 km	MPC · JPL
453749	2011 CN_{37}	—	February 27, 2006	Kitt Peak	Spacewatch	·	2.2 km	MPC · JPL
453750	2011 CZ_{52}	—	September 19, 2003	Kitt Peak	Spacewatch	·	3.2 km	MPC · JPL
453751	2011 CJ_{68}	—	February 8, 2010	WISE	WISE	·	4.3 km	MPC · JPL
453752	2011 CU_{69}	—	January 11, 2011	Kitt Peak	Spacewatch	·	2.9 km	MPC · JPL
453753	2011 CH_{72}	—	October 26, 2009	Mount Lemmon	Mount Lemmon Survey	·	2.8 km	MPC · JPL
453754	2011 CV_{76}	—	September 25, 2008	Mount Lemmon	Mount Lemmon Survey	·	2.6 km	MPC · JPL
453755	2011 CO_{83}	—	December 11, 2004	Kitt Peak	Spacewatch	·	2.6 km	MPC · JPL
453756	2011 DP_{10}	—	January 27, 2011	Mount Lemmon	Mount Lemmon Survey	H	540 m	MPC · JPL
453757	2011 DC_{43}	—	September 16, 2009	Mount Lemmon	Mount Lemmon Survey	·	2.2 km	MPC · JPL
453758	2011 DC_{49}	—	May 20, 2006	Catalina	CSS	·	2.6 km	MPC · JPL
453759	2011 DF_{50}	—	March 25, 2006	Mount Lemmon	Mount Lemmon Survey	·	2.7 km	MPC · JPL
453760	2011 DY_{50}	—	May 2, 2000	Socorro	LINEAR	·	4.2 km	MPC · JPL
453761	2011 EH_{11}	—	January 29, 2011	Kitt Peak	Spacewatch	·	2.9 km	MPC · JPL
453762	2011 EY_{15}	—	February 29, 2000	Socorro	LINEAR	·	2.7 km	MPC · JPL
453763	2011 EC_{23}	—	March 4, 2011	Catalina	CSS	·	3.1 km	MPC · JPL
453764	2011 EO_{27}	—	January 16, 2005	Kitt Peak	Spacewatch	THM	2.0 km	MPC · JPL
453765	2011 ET_{52}	—	January 16, 2005	Kitt Peak	Spacewatch	·	2.4 km	MPC · JPL
453766	2011 EZ_{73}	—	December 13, 2002	Socorro	LINEAR	H	730 m	MPC · JPL
453767	2011 EM_{86}	—	March 11, 2005	Mount Lemmon	Mount Lemmon Survey	·	3.2 km	MPC · JPL
453768	2011 FT_{42}	—	February 9, 2005	Anderson Mesa	LONEOS	LIX	3.4 km	MPC · JPL
453769	2011 FU_{140}	—	November 9, 2009	Mount Lemmon	Mount Lemmon Survey	·	4.0 km	MPC · JPL
453770	2011 FT_{154}	—	March 9, 2003	Anderson Mesa	LONEOS	H	660 m	MPC · JPL
453771	2011 GX_{62}	—	March 20, 2010	WISE	WISE	·	3.8 km	MPC · JPL
453772	2011 GF_{69}	—	April 13, 2008	Kitt Peak	Spacewatch	·	1.0 km	MPC · JPL
453773	2011 GY_{69}	—	March 13, 2011	Mount Lemmon	Mount Lemmon Survey	·	3.7 km	MPC · JPL
453774	2011 GL_{76}	—	March 17, 2005	Mount Lemmon	Mount Lemmon Survey	·	2.6 km	MPC · JPL
453775	2011 HQ_{5}	—	June 29, 2008	Siding Spring	SSS	·	1.0 km	MPC · JPL
453776	2011 HZ_{7}	—	February 7, 2008	Catalina	CSS	H	660 m	MPC · JPL
453777	2011 HB_{35}	—	April 4, 2008	Catalina	CSS	H	590 m	MPC · JPL
453778	2011 JK	—	May 1, 2011	Mount Lemmon	Mount Lemmon Survey	AMO · PHA	700 m	MPC · JPL
453779	2011 JW_{9}	—	May 7, 2011	Mount Lemmon	Mount Lemmon Survey	L5	10 km	MPC · JPL
453780	2011 KH_{6}	—	September 24, 1995	Kitt Peak	Spacewatch	·	510 m	MPC · JPL
453781	2011 KD_{20}	—	September 11, 2001	Socorro	LINEAR	PHO	1.4 km	MPC · JPL
453782	2011 KY_{35}	—	July 28, 2008	Mount Lemmon	Mount Lemmon Survey	·	690 m	MPC · JPL
453783	2011 LR_{18}	—	May 21, 2011	Kitt Peak	Spacewatch	·	670 m	MPC · JPL
453784	2011 OT_{26}	—	June 12, 2011	Mount Lemmon	Mount Lemmon Survey	·	800 m	MPC · JPL
453785	2011 OO_{33}	—	September 13, 2005	Kitt Peak	Spacewatch	·	710 m	MPC · JPL
453786	2011 OE_{41}	—	March 12, 2007	Kitt Peak	Spacewatch	·	780 m	MPC · JPL
453787	2011 OV_{44}	—	December 2, 2008	Mount Lemmon	Mount Lemmon Survey	V	540 m	MPC · JPL
453788	2011 PY_{3}	—	January 26, 2006	Kitt Peak	Spacewatch	·	1.4 km	MPC · JPL
453789	2011 PH_{11}	—	April 1, 2010	WISE	WISE	L5	10 km	MPC · JPL
453790	2011 QA_{45}	—	October 10, 2008	Mount Lemmon	Mount Lemmon Survey	·	600 m	MPC · JPL
453791	2011 QY_{48}	—	June 11, 2011	Mount Lemmon	Mount Lemmon Survey	·	1.1 km	MPC · JPL
453792	2011 QS_{55}	—	February 17, 2010	Kitt Peak	Spacewatch	·	680 m	MPC · JPL
453793	2011 QM_{63}	—	November 21, 2000	Socorro	LINEAR	·	1.4 km	MPC · JPL
453794	2011 QF_{65}	—	September 25, 2000	Kitt Peak	Spacewatch	·	920 m	MPC · JPL
453795	2011 QC_{70}	—	March 11, 2007	Kitt Peak	Spacewatch	·	730 m	MPC · JPL
453796	2011 QC_{73}	—	October 12, 2004	Kitt Peak	Spacewatch	MAS	640 m	MPC · JPL
453797	2011 QW_{87}	—	March 15, 2010	Kitt Peak	Spacewatch	·	800 m	MPC · JPL
453798	2011 SH	—	March 11, 1999	Kitt Peak	Spacewatch	·	1.2 km	MPC · JPL
453799	2011 SZ_{8}	—	September 18, 2011	Mount Lemmon	Mount Lemmon Survey	MAS	700 m	MPC · JPL
453800	2011 SN_{13}	—	October 24, 2008	Kitt Peak	Spacewatch	·	790 m	MPC · JPL

== 453801–453900 ==
back to top

Designation			Discovery			Properties		Ref
Permanent	Provisional	Named after	Date	Site	Discoverer(s)	Category	Diam.	Ref
453801	2011 SP_{18}	—	November 7, 2008	Mount Lemmon	Mount Lemmon Survey	·	860 m	MPC · JPL
453802	2011 SN_{21}	—	January 3, 2009	Mount Lemmon	Mount Lemmon Survey	·	1.2 km	MPC · JPL
453803	2011 SO_{21}	—	September 18, 2011	Catalina	CSS	·	1.1 km	MPC · JPL
453804	2011 SH_{35}	—	February 1, 2009	Kitt Peak	Spacewatch	MAS	770 m	MPC · JPL
453805	2011 SJ_{39}	—	August 16, 2007	XuYi	PMO NEO Survey Program	·	1.1 km	MPC · JPL
453806	2011 SO_{61}	—	October 27, 2005	Kitt Peak	Spacewatch	·	740 m	MPC · JPL
453807	2011 SM_{65}	—	November 1, 2000	Socorro	LINEAR	·	1.4 km	MPC · JPL
453808	2011 SA_{67}	—	September 22, 2011	Kitt Peak	Spacewatch	NYS	1.4 km	MPC · JPL
453809	2011 SE_{74}	—	January 22, 2006	Mount Lemmon	Mount Lemmon Survey	·	1.5 km	MPC · JPL
453810	2011 SD_{78}	—	December 2, 2008	Kitt Peak	Spacewatch	·	700 m	MPC · JPL
453811	2011 SK_{80}	—	November 11, 2004	Kitt Peak	Spacewatch	NYS	920 m	MPC · JPL
453812	2011 SW_{84}	—	December 5, 2007	Kitt Peak	Spacewatch	·	1.3 km	MPC · JPL
453813	2011 SW_{86}	—	April 20, 2010	Kitt Peak	Spacewatch	·	1.2 km	MPC · JPL
453814	2011 SD_{88}	—	December 4, 2007	Catalina	CSS	·	890 m	MPC · JPL
453815	2011 SF_{102}	—	October 11, 2004	Kitt Peak	Spacewatch	NYS	560 m	MPC · JPL
453816	2011 SA_{105}	—	July 3, 2003	Kitt Peak	Spacewatch	·	1.6 km	MPC · JPL
453817	2011 SS_{105}	—	September 10, 2007	Mount Lemmon	Mount Lemmon Survey	·	960 m	MPC · JPL
453818	2011 SJ_{109}	—	March 18, 2010	Mount Lemmon	Mount Lemmon Survey	·	680 m	MPC · JPL
453819	2011 SJ_{117}	—	December 10, 2004	Socorro	LINEAR	·	1.1 km	MPC · JPL
453820	2011 SL_{117}	—	January 16, 2009	Kitt Peak	Spacewatch	·	1.2 km	MPC · JPL
453821	2011 SJ_{123}	—	December 31, 2008	Kitt Peak	Spacewatch	NYS	1.1 km	MPC · JPL
453822	2011 SY_{123}	—	September 23, 2011	Kitt Peak	Spacewatch	·	1.5 km	MPC · JPL
453823	2011 SO_{124}	—	September 10, 2007	Kitt Peak	Spacewatch	·	930 m	MPC · JPL
453824	2011 SF_{131}	—	October 8, 2007	Mount Lemmon	Mount Lemmon Survey	(5)	1.1 km	MPC · JPL
453825	2011 SS_{131}	—	September 12, 2007	Kitt Peak	Spacewatch	·	1.0 km	MPC · JPL
453826	2011 SX_{133}	—	April 26, 2006	Kitt Peak	Spacewatch	·	1.5 km	MPC · JPL
453827	2011 SN_{137}	—	January 20, 2009	Kitt Peak	Spacewatch	NYS	1.1 km	MPC · JPL
453828	2011 SU_{144}	—	March 25, 2006	Kitt Peak	Spacewatch	·	1.4 km	MPC · JPL
453829	2011 SF_{146}	—	December 18, 2004	Mount Lemmon	Mount Lemmon Survey	·	900 m	MPC · JPL
453830	2011 SK_{146}	—	August 23, 2007	Kitt Peak	Spacewatch	MAS	750 m	MPC · JPL
453831	2011 SH_{163}	—	November 19, 2003	Kitt Peak	Spacewatch	·	890 m	MPC · JPL
453832	2011 SE_{165}	—	September 20, 2011	Kitt Peak	Spacewatch	V	700 m	MPC · JPL
453833	2011 SL_{170}	—	March 13, 2010	Mount Lemmon	Mount Lemmon Survey	NYS	1.1 km	MPC · JPL
453834	2011 SM_{182}	—	February 4, 2005	Catalina	CSS	·	1.4 km	MPC · JPL
453835	2011 SO_{182}	—	September 18, 2003	Kitt Peak	Spacewatch	·	640 m	MPC · JPL
453836	2011 SD_{213}	—	September 11, 2007	Mount Lemmon	Mount Lemmon Survey	MAS	580 m	MPC · JPL
453837	2011 SP_{216}	—	September 8, 2011	Kitt Peak	Spacewatch	CLA	1.7 km	MPC · JPL
453838	2011 SQ_{240}	—	November 2, 2000	Kitt Peak	Spacewatch	MAS	560 m	MPC · JPL
453839	2011 SM_{249}	—	November 21, 1993	Kitt Peak	Spacewatch	·	1.1 km	MPC · JPL
453840	2011 SZ_{252}	—	September 8, 2011	Kitt Peak	Spacewatch	·	900 m	MPC · JPL
453841	2011 SR_{254}	—	March 26, 2007	Mount Lemmon	Mount Lemmon Survey	·	670 m	MPC · JPL
453842	2011 SK_{272}	—	January 30, 2006	Kitt Peak	Spacewatch	·	750 m	MPC · JPL
453843	2011 SY_{274}	—	August 9, 2007	Kitt Peak	Spacewatch	V	660 m	MPC · JPL
453844	2011 UB_{2}	—	September 26, 2011	Kitt Peak	Spacewatch	(5)	960 m	MPC · JPL
453845	2011 UH_{12}	—	September 20, 2011	Catalina	CSS	·	1.5 km	MPC · JPL
453846	2011 UP_{14}	—	September 23, 2011	Kitt Peak	Spacewatch	·	1.2 km	MPC · JPL
453847	2011 UR_{17}	—	February 20, 2009	Catalina	CSS	·	1.6 km	MPC · JPL
453848	2011 UW_{17}	—	December 18, 2004	Mount Lemmon	Mount Lemmon Survey	MAS	670 m	MPC · JPL
453849	2011 UH_{25}	—	September 14, 2007	Anderson Mesa	LONEOS	·	1.0 km	MPC · JPL
453850	2011 UL_{27}	—	December 20, 2004	Mount Lemmon	Mount Lemmon Survey	·	1.1 km	MPC · JPL
453851	2011 UT_{31}	—	February 19, 2001	Socorro	LINEAR	·	1.2 km	MPC · JPL
453852	2011 UN_{41}	—	October 15, 2007	Kitt Peak	Spacewatch	·	830 m	MPC · JPL
453853	2011 UW_{44}	—	February 2, 2009	Kitt Peak	Spacewatch	·	1.1 km	MPC · JPL
453854	2011 UR_{47}	—	November 10, 2004	Kitt Peak	Spacewatch	·	810 m	MPC · JPL
453855	2011 UY_{49}	—	October 18, 2011	Kitt Peak	Spacewatch	EUN	850 m	MPC · JPL
453856	2011 UQ_{51}	—	November 19, 2007	Kitt Peak	Spacewatch	MAR	780 m	MPC · JPL
453857	2011 UO_{53}	—	October 18, 2011	Kitt Peak	Spacewatch	·	1.1 km	MPC · JPL
453858	2011 UU_{59}	—	October 20, 2011	Mount Lemmon	Mount Lemmon Survey	·	1.2 km	MPC · JPL
453859	2011 UJ_{62}	—	September 23, 2011	Kitt Peak	Spacewatch	·	850 m	MPC · JPL
453860	2011 UL_{62}	—	January 18, 2009	Kitt Peak	Spacewatch	NYS	1.1 km	MPC · JPL
453861	2011 UP_{82}	—	October 19, 2011	Kitt Peak	Spacewatch	·	1.3 km	MPC · JPL
453862	2011 UP_{86}	—	January 7, 2005	Socorro	LINEAR	·	1.2 km	MPC · JPL
453863	2011 UB_{95}	—	December 22, 2008	Mount Lemmon	Mount Lemmon Survey	NYS	940 m	MPC · JPL
453864	2011 UP_{98}	—	December 10, 2004	Kitt Peak	Spacewatch	·	930 m	MPC · JPL
453865	2011 UD_{101}	—	October 14, 2007	Kitt Peak	Spacewatch	·	1.4 km	MPC · JPL
453866	2011 UB_{102}	—	October 20, 2011	Mount Lemmon	Mount Lemmon Survey	·	1.3 km	MPC · JPL
453867	2011 UX_{102}	—	September 20, 2003	Campo Imperatore	CINEOS	·	1.1 km	MPC · JPL
453868	2011 UK_{114}	—	May 11, 2010	Mount Lemmon	Mount Lemmon Survey	·	1.3 km	MPC · JPL
453869	2011 UE_{115}	—	October 1, 2000	Anderson Mesa	LONEOS	·	1.2 km	MPC · JPL
453870	2011 UO_{115}	—	September 21, 2000	Kitt Peak	Spacewatch	·	830 m	MPC · JPL
453871	2011 UE_{116}	—	January 19, 2009	Mount Lemmon	Mount Lemmon Survey	·	960 m	MPC · JPL
453872	2011 UY_{118}	—	September 13, 2007	Mount Lemmon	Mount Lemmon Survey	·	1.0 km	MPC · JPL
453873	2011 UD_{126}	—	October 20, 2011	Kitt Peak	Spacewatch	·	1.4 km	MPC · JPL
453874	2011 UF_{126}	—	April 1, 2000	Kitt Peak	Spacewatch	·	1.9 km	MPC · JPL
453875	2011 UX_{126}	—	November 20, 2007	Kitt Peak	Spacewatch	·	1.1 km	MPC · JPL
453876	2011 UE_{127}	—	September 20, 2011	Kitt Peak	Spacewatch	·	1.3 km	MPC · JPL
453877	2011 UT_{132}	—	October 22, 2011	Kitt Peak	Spacewatch	NYS	1.1 km	MPC · JPL
453878	2011 UC_{133}	—	October 4, 2007	Mount Lemmon	Mount Lemmon Survey	NYS	960 m	MPC · JPL
453879	2011 UZ_{149}	—	September 29, 2011	Mount Lemmon	Mount Lemmon Survey	·	800 m	MPC · JPL
453880	2011 UE_{152}	—	September 12, 2007	Mount Lemmon	Mount Lemmon Survey	NYS · critical	800 m	MPC · JPL
453881	2011 UL_{153}	—	October 22, 2011	Kitt Peak	Spacewatch	·	1.2 km	MPC · JPL
453882	2011 UU_{155}	—	October 24, 2011	Mount Lemmon	Mount Lemmon Survey	·	1.3 km	MPC · JPL
453883	2011 UO_{161}	—	October 8, 2002	Palomar	NEAT	·	1.5 km	MPC · JPL
453884	2011 UX_{170}	—	October 21, 2011	Kitt Peak	Spacewatch	NEM	2.1 km	MPC · JPL
453885	2011 UP_{173}	—	January 1, 2009	Mount Lemmon	Mount Lemmon Survey	·	830 m	MPC · JPL
453886	2011 UW_{177}	—	May 4, 2009	Mount Lemmon	Mount Lemmon Survey	·	1.5 km	MPC · JPL
453887	2011 UR_{178}	—	November 8, 2007	Kitt Peak	Spacewatch	·	1.4 km	MPC · JPL
453888	2011 UA_{179}	—	March 8, 2010	WISE	WISE	PHO	2.3 km	MPC · JPL
453889	2011 UR_{187}	—	November 9, 2007	Catalina	CSS	(5)	1.2 km	MPC · JPL
453890	2011 UY_{190}	—	November 12, 2007	Mount Lemmon	Mount Lemmon Survey	·	1.6 km	MPC · JPL
453891	2011 UJ_{193}	—	September 23, 2011	Mount Lemmon	Mount Lemmon Survey	(5)	1.2 km	MPC · JPL
453892	2011 UY_{194}	—	July 15, 2007	Siding Spring	SSS	·	1.6 km	MPC · JPL
453893	2011 UE_{197}	—	August 27, 2006	Kitt Peak	Spacewatch	PAD	1.4 km	MPC · JPL
453894	2011 UZ_{228}	—	February 3, 2009	Kitt Peak	Spacewatch	NYS	950 m	MPC · JPL
453895	2011 UR_{245}	—	November 17, 2007	Catalina	CSS	·	1.2 km	MPC · JPL
453896	2011 UE_{255}	—	September 4, 2007	Catalina	CSS	MAS	690 m	MPC · JPL
453897	2011 UQ_{265}	—	September 12, 2007	Anderson Mesa	LONEOS	MAS	610 m	MPC · JPL
453898	2011 UY_{267}	—	August 24, 2007	Kitt Peak	Spacewatch	NYS	1.2 km	MPC · JPL
453899	2011 UJ_{283}	—	October 28, 2011	Kitt Peak	Spacewatch	·	1.3 km	MPC · JPL
453900	2011 UD_{291}	—	February 20, 2009	Kitt Peak	Spacewatch	NYS	1.2 km	MPC · JPL

== 453901–454000 ==
back to top

Designation			Discovery			Properties		Ref
Permanent	Provisional	Named after	Date	Site	Discoverer(s)	Category	Diam.	Ref
453901	2011 UC_{298}	—	October 21, 2011	Kitt Peak	Spacewatch	MAS	620 m	MPC · JPL
453902	2011 UK_{298}	—	June 21, 2007	Mount Lemmon	Mount Lemmon Survey	V	540 m	MPC · JPL
453903	2011 UK_{315}	—	October 22, 2011	Kitt Peak	Spacewatch	·	1.6 km	MPC · JPL
453904	2011 UN_{317}	—	December 19, 2007	Kitt Peak	Spacewatch	(5)	1.1 km	MPC · JPL
453905	2011 UR_{317}	—	November 20, 2007	Kitt Peak	Spacewatch	·	1.3 km	MPC · JPL
453906	2011 UN_{318}	—	September 12, 2007	Kitt Peak	Spacewatch	CLA	1.5 km	MPC · JPL
453907	2011 UZ_{320}	—	September 29, 2011	Kitt Peak	Spacewatch	·	1.3 km	MPC · JPL
453908	2011 UB_{321}	—	January 15, 2005	Socorro	LINEAR	·	870 m	MPC · JPL
453909	2011 UA_{327}	—	October 21, 2011	Mount Lemmon	Mount Lemmon Survey	·	790 m	MPC · JPL
453910	2011 US_{339}	—	December 30, 2008	Kitt Peak	Spacewatch	·	1.4 km	MPC · JPL
453911	2011 UC_{383}	—	October 30, 2002	Kitt Peak	Spacewatch	·	1.7 km	MPC · JPL
453912	2011 UR_{384}	—	October 1, 2011	Mount Lemmon	Mount Lemmon Survey	KON	2.2 km	MPC · JPL
453913	2011 US_{389}	—	February 4, 2005	Kitt Peak	Spacewatch	·	1.5 km	MPC · JPL
453914	2011 VE_{10}	—	April 6, 2005	Mount Lemmon	Mount Lemmon Survey	·	880 m	MPC · JPL
453915	2011 VL_{13}	—	October 18, 2011	Mount Lemmon	Mount Lemmon Survey	·	1.4 km	MPC · JPL
453916	2011 VZ_{15}	—	January 16, 2005	Kitt Peak	Spacewatch	·	920 m	MPC · JPL
453917	2011 WA_{16}	—	September 11, 2007	Mount Lemmon	Mount Lemmon Survey	·	800 m	MPC · JPL
453918	2011 WK_{39}	—	March 10, 2005	Anderson Mesa	LONEOS	·	1.3 km	MPC · JPL
453919	2011 WA_{55}	—	September 18, 2007	Kitt Peak	Spacewatch	·	1.0 km	MPC · JPL
453920	2011 WG_{57}	—	October 21, 2011	Mount Lemmon	Mount Lemmon Survey	·	1.0 km	MPC · JPL
453921	2011 WZ_{58}	—	November 18, 2007	Mount Lemmon	Mount Lemmon Survey	·	780 m	MPC · JPL
453922	2011 WH_{59}	—	October 10, 2007	Mount Lemmon	Mount Lemmon Survey	MAS	600 m	MPC · JPL
453923	2011 WF_{60}	—	September 3, 2007	Catalina	CSS	·	1.1 km	MPC · JPL
453924	2011 WC_{61}	—	October 9, 2007	Socorro	LINEAR	·	1.5 km	MPC · JPL
453925	2011 WH_{82}	—	November 14, 2007	Kitt Peak	Spacewatch	·	1.0 km	MPC · JPL
453926	2011 WO_{86}	—	October 19, 2007	Mount Lemmon	Mount Lemmon Survey	·	890 m	MPC · JPL
453927	2011 WG_{91}	—	December 18, 2007	Catalina	CSS	·	1.3 km	MPC · JPL
453928	2011 WH_{112}	—	March 17, 2005	Mount Lemmon	Mount Lemmon Survey	·	1.2 km	MPC · JPL
453929	2011 WX_{112}	—	November 18, 2011	Catalina	CSS	·	2.0 km	MPC · JPL
453930	2011 WE_{123}	—	November 13, 2007	Kitt Peak	Spacewatch	(5)	1.1 km	MPC · JPL
453931	2011 WM_{128}	—	October 31, 2011	Kitt Peak	Spacewatch	·	1.4 km	MPC · JPL
453932	2011 WX_{128}	—	May 10, 2005	Kitt Peak	Spacewatch	·	1.7 km	MPC · JPL
453933	2011 WQ_{129}	—	April 19, 2010	WISE	WISE	·	1.5 km	MPC · JPL
453934	2011 WF_{152}	—	May 10, 2010	WISE	WISE	·	4.0 km	MPC · JPL
453935	2011 XS	—	December 30, 2007	Mount Lemmon	Mount Lemmon Survey	·	900 m	MPC · JPL
453936	2011 YC_{11}	—	November 12, 2007	Mount Lemmon	Mount Lemmon Survey	(5)	1.3 km	MPC · JPL
453937	2011 YB_{25}	—	November 28, 2011	Mount Lemmon	Mount Lemmon Survey	·	1.7 km	MPC · JPL
453938	2011 YX_{28}	—	December 27, 2011	Catalina	CSS	·	2.6 km	MPC · JPL
453939	2011 YO_{35}	—	September 20, 2006	Catalina	CSS	·	1.6 km	MPC · JPL
453940	2011 YX_{40}	—	December 24, 2011	Mount Lemmon	Mount Lemmon Survey	·	2.0 km	MPC · JPL
453941	2011 YC_{44}	—	February 8, 2008	Mount Lemmon	Mount Lemmon Survey	·	2.0 km	MPC · JPL
453942	2011 YL_{44}	—	November 22, 2006	Mount Lemmon	Mount Lemmon Survey	·	1.7 km	MPC · JPL
453943	2011 YN_{44}	—	January 30, 2008	Mount Lemmon	Mount Lemmon Survey	·	1.1 km	MPC · JPL
453944	2011 YP_{44}	—	December 31, 2002	Socorro	LINEAR	·	2.2 km	MPC · JPL
453945	2011 YM_{47}	—	September 17, 2006	Catalina	CSS	EUN	1.2 km	MPC · JPL
453946	2011 YK_{60}	—	November 28, 2011	Mount Lemmon	Mount Lemmon Survey	ADE	2.0 km	MPC · JPL
453947	2011 YH_{61}	—	December 30, 2011	Kitt Peak	Spacewatch	·	1.8 km	MPC · JPL
453948	2011 YH_{64}	—	April 15, 2004	Socorro	LINEAR	EUN	1.4 km	MPC · JPL
453949	2011 YU_{65}	—	March 10, 2008	Mount Lemmon	Mount Lemmon Survey	·	1.5 km	MPC · JPL
453950	2011 YH_{70}	—	December 24, 2011	Catalina	CSS	·	2.6 km	MPC · JPL
453951	2012 AA_{7}	—	November 15, 2006	Catalina	CSS	·	1.8 km	MPC · JPL
453952	2012 AE_{8}	—	August 28, 2006	Kitt Peak	Spacewatch	·	1.0 km	MPC · JPL
453953	2012 AZ_{9}	—	October 13, 2006	Kitt Peak	Spacewatch	·	1.4 km	MPC · JPL
453954	2012 AZ_{17}	—	January 14, 2012	Mount Lemmon	Mount Lemmon Survey	·	1.5 km	MPC · JPL
453955	2012 AD_{24}	—	July 10, 2010	WISE	WISE	·	1.6 km	MPC · JPL
453956	2012 BP_{3}	—	October 16, 2007	Kitt Peak	Spacewatch	·	2.6 km	MPC · JPL
453957	2012 BA_{17}	—	January 19, 2012	Kitt Peak	Spacewatch	·	1.7 km	MPC · JPL
453958	2012 BW_{20}	—	January 24, 2007	Mount Lemmon	Mount Lemmon Survey	·	2.4 km	MPC · JPL
453959	2012 BO_{33}	—	March 6, 2008	Mount Lemmon	Mount Lemmon Survey	·	1.7 km	MPC · JPL
453960	2012 BR_{40}	—	January 10, 2008	Mount Lemmon	Mount Lemmon Survey	RAF	900 m	MPC · JPL
453961	2012 BX_{51}	—	January 21, 2012	Kitt Peak	Spacewatch	·	1.5 km	MPC · JPL
453962	2012 BZ_{66}	—	March 31, 2008	Catalina	CSS	·	1.6 km	MPC · JPL
453963	2012 BK_{71}	—	November 26, 2011	Mount Lemmon	Mount Lemmon Survey	·	2.2 km	MPC · JPL
453964	2012 BZ_{75}	—	December 2, 2005	Kitt Peak	Spacewatch	VER	2.9 km	MPC · JPL
453965	2012 BZ_{77}	—	December 27, 2011	Mount Lemmon	Mount Lemmon Survey	(5)	1.1 km	MPC · JPL
453966	2012 BO_{84}	—	October 12, 2010	Kitt Peak	Spacewatch	·	1.4 km	MPC · JPL
453967	2012 BP_{86}	—	December 28, 2011	Catalina	CSS	·	1.9 km	MPC · JPL
453968	2012 BF_{87}	—	January 12, 2008	Catalina	CSS	·	1.2 km	MPC · JPL
453969	2012 BG_{89}	—	April 16, 2004	Kitt Peak	Spacewatch	(5)	1.2 km	MPC · JPL
453970	2012 BH_{91}	—	January 26, 2012	Kitt Peak	Spacewatch	·	1.8 km	MPC · JPL
453971	2012 BX_{95}	—	September 28, 2006	Mount Lemmon	Mount Lemmon Survey	JUN	1.1 km	MPC · JPL
453972	2012 BV_{103}	—	October 14, 2007	Mount Lemmon	Mount Lemmon Survey	(5)	1.2 km	MPC · JPL
453973	2012 BC_{104}	—	January 4, 2012	Kitt Peak	Spacewatch	BRA	1.3 km	MPC · JPL
453974	2012 BT_{104}	—	October 21, 2006	Mount Lemmon	Mount Lemmon Survey	·	1.6 km	MPC · JPL
453975	2012 BY_{112}	—	September 17, 2006	Kitt Peak	Spacewatch	·	1.0 km	MPC · JPL
453976	2012 BS_{119}	—	September 26, 2006	Kitt Peak	Spacewatch	·	860 m	MPC · JPL
453977	2012 BV_{120}	—	January 29, 2012	Mount Lemmon	Mount Lemmon Survey	·	1.7 km	MPC · JPL
453978	2012 BB_{121}	—	April 26, 2008	Mount Lemmon	Mount Lemmon Survey	·	1.8 km	MPC · JPL
453979	2012 BO_{124}	—	November 22, 2006	Kitt Peak	Spacewatch	·	1.6 km	MPC · JPL
453980	2012 BF_{126}	—	May 8, 2008	Mount Lemmon	Mount Lemmon Survey	·	2.0 km	MPC · JPL
453981	2012 BY_{128}	—	January 19, 2012	Kitt Peak	Spacewatch	·	1.9 km	MPC · JPL
453982	2012 BJ_{129}	—	January 29, 2012	Kitt Peak	Spacewatch	·	1.6 km	MPC · JPL
453983	2012 BH_{139}	—	January 29, 2012	Mount Lemmon	Mount Lemmon Survey	·	1.4 km	MPC · JPL
453984	2012 BM_{143}	—	October 28, 2010	Mount Lemmon	Mount Lemmon Survey	·	2.1 km	MPC · JPL
453985	2012 BU_{144}	—	January 26, 2012	Mount Lemmon	Mount Lemmon Survey	·	1.5 km	MPC · JPL
453986	2012 BP_{149}	—	April 14, 2008	Mount Lemmon	Mount Lemmon Survey	·	1.9 km	MPC · JPL
453987	2012 BL_{150}	—	November 18, 2006	Kitt Peak	Spacewatch	·	1.7 km	MPC · JPL
453988	2012 BZ_{150}	—	December 3, 2010	Mount Lemmon	Mount Lemmon Survey	·	1.9 km	MPC · JPL
453989	2012 CN_{5}	—	March 5, 2008	Mount Lemmon	Mount Lemmon Survey	·	2.0 km	MPC · JPL
453990	2012 CG_{8}	—	September 30, 2006	Mount Lemmon	Mount Lemmon Survey	·	1.3 km	MPC · JPL
453991	2012 CW_{8}	—	October 23, 2006	Kitt Peak	Spacewatch	·	1.2 km	MPC · JPL
453992	2012 CK_{15}	—	January 30, 2008	Mount Lemmon	Mount Lemmon Survey	·	970 m	MPC · JPL
453993	2012 CB_{30}	—	May 3, 2005	Kitt Peak	Spacewatch	·	1.7 km	MPC · JPL
453994	2012 CU_{32}	—	November 16, 2006	Kitt Peak	Spacewatch	·	1.8 km	MPC · JPL
453995	2012 CS_{37}	—	September 17, 2009	Mount Lemmon	Mount Lemmon Survey	·	2.9 km	MPC · JPL
453996	2012 CN_{38}	—	March 6, 2008	Catalina	CSS	·	1.6 km	MPC · JPL
453997	2012 CJ_{40}	—	December 27, 2005	Kitt Peak	Spacewatch	·	2.8 km	MPC · JPL
453998	2012 CE_{45}	—	March 12, 2007	Kitt Peak	Spacewatch	·	2.2 km	MPC · JPL
453999	2012 CY_{49}	—	April 1, 2008	Mount Lemmon	Mount Lemmon Survey	(5)	1.3 km	MPC · JPL
454000	2012 CS_{53}	—	November 3, 2011	Mount Lemmon	Mount Lemmon Survey	·	3.2 km	MPC · JPL

back to top

== Meaning of names ==
As minor planet discoveries are confirmed, they are given a permanent number by the IAU's Minor Planet Center (MPC), and the discoverers can then submit names for them, following the IAU's naming conventions. The list below concerns those minor planets in the specified number-range that have received names, and explains the meanings of those names.

Official naming citations of newly named small Solar System bodies are approved and published in a bulletin by IAU's Working Group for Small Bodies Nomenclature (WGSBN). Before May 2021, citations were published in MPC's Minor Planet Circulars for many decades. Recent citations can also be found on the JPL Small-Body Database (SBDB). Until his death in 2016, German astronomer Lutz D. Schmadel compiled these citations into the Dictionary of Minor Planet Names (DMP) and regularly updated the collection.

Based on Paul Herget's The Names of the Minor Planets, Schmadel also researched the unclear origin of numerous asteroids, most of which had been named prior to World War II. This article incorporates text from this source, which is in the public domain: SBDB New namings may only be added to this list below after official publication as the preannouncement of names is condemned. The WGSBN publishes a comprehensive guideline for the naming rules of non-cometary small Solar System bodies.

Named minor planet	Provisional	This minor planet was named for...	Ref · Catalog
453256 Gucevičius	2008 SP_{139}	Laurynas Gucevičius (1753–1798) was an architect from the Grand Duchy of Lithuania. Most of his designs were built in Lithuania, including the Vilnius Cathedral and town hall, as well as the Verkiai Palace.	IAU · 453256
453715 Blakesullivan	2011 AZ_{11}	Blake Sullivan, American amateur paleontologist primarily focusing on fossils of the western United States.	IAU · 453715
