= Migonys =

- Location of Migonys
- Coordinates: 55°44′40″N 25°02′20″E
- Country: Lithuania
- Ethnographic region: Aukštaitija
- County: Panevėžys County
- Municipality: Kupiškis district municipality
- Eldership: Šimoniai elderate
- First mentioned: 1594

Population (2011)
  - Total: 106
- Time zone: UTC+2 (EET)
  - Summer (DST): UTC+3 (EEST)

Migonys is a village in the Kupiškis district municipality, Lithuania. According to the 2011 census, it had 106 inhabitants. The village celebrated its 400th anniversary in 1924. There is a hill-fort and 36 tumuli (28 survive) in the vicinity of the village.

18th century Lithuanian architect Laurynas Gucevičius was born in Migonys.
