= Laurynas Gucevičius =

Polish–Lithuanian architect (1753–1798)

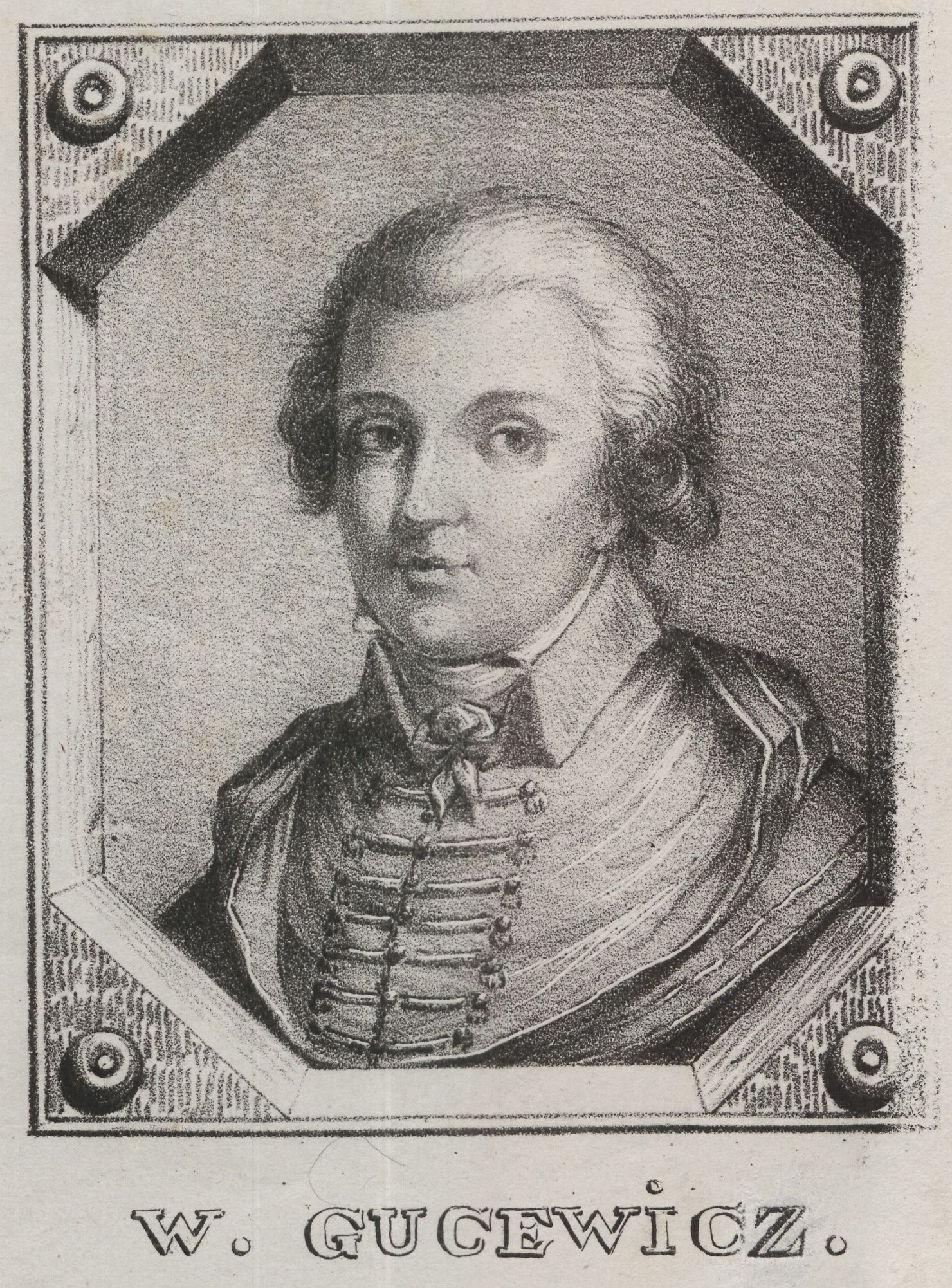
- Born: Laurynas Masiulis (Latin: Laurentius Masulis); 1753; Migonys, Grand Duchy of Lithuania, Polish-Lithuanian Commonwealth
- Died: 10 December 1798 (aged 44–45); Vilnius, Russian Empire
- Occupation: Architect
- Buildings: Verkiai Palace; Vilnius Town Hall; Vilnius Cathedral
- Projects: Temple of Divine Providence, Warsaw

Signature
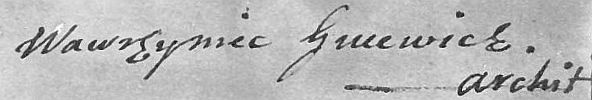

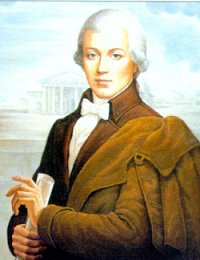
Modern representation of Gucevičius

Laurynas Gucevičius (Polish: Wawrzyniec Gucewicz; 1753–1798) was a Polish–Lithuanian architect from the Grand Duchy of Lithuania, where all of his designs were built.

== Biography ==
He was born in the village of Migonys near Kupiškis, in the Grand Duchy of Lithuania. His father was a Lithuanian peasant, Simonas Masiulis. He was baptized as Laurynas Masiulis. His Lithuanian mother, Kotryna Žekonytė Masiulienė, died early in his youth, and her relative and his godmother Ona Baltušytė-Gucevičienė (Polish: Anna Gucewicz) supported him and financed his studies. After her, he changed his surname to Gucevičius. He attended local schools at Kupiškis and Palėvenė, and then the gymnasium in Panevėžys. According to his student and biographer Karol Podczaszyński, the school in Kupiškis was the place where Gucevičius for the first time started to learn the Polish language. In 1773, he joined the Academy of Vilnius. He studied engineering, attending the lectures on architecture held by Marcin Knackfus. Around that time, he also became a missionary monk.

His guardian became the Bishop of Vilnius, Ignacy Massalski, who in 1775, sent him to Warsaw, and a year or two later, to Rome. Along with a large number of young artists and architects from the Polish–Lithuanian Commonwealth (among them Chrystian Piotr Aigner, Szymon Bogumił Zug, Stanisław Zawadzki, Ephraim Schröger and Jakub Kubicki), he spent a year there studying classical architecture. After returning, Hugo Kołłątaj offered him a position as a professor of architecture at the Jagiellonian University.

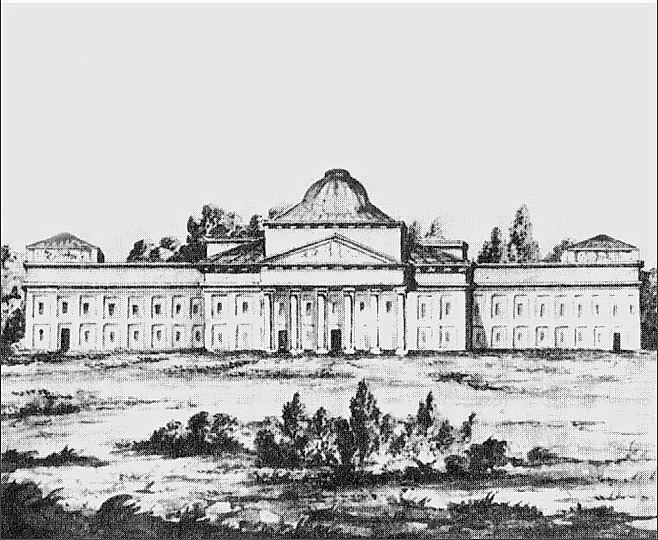
Central palace in Verkiai, drawn before its demolition

In the following years, he travelled through Western European countries, where he attended lectures on architecture and learned from the works of the most renowned architects of the time. He visited France, Denmark, Sweden, and various German states. He spent a year and a half studying in Paris under the guidance of Jacques-Germain Soufflot and Claude Nicolas Ledoux. On his return, he was hired by Bishop Ignacy Jakub Massalski, for whom he designed and built the episcopal Verkiai palace, later known after its later owners, the Wittgenstein family. The palace and the surrounding architectural complex, the work on which was commenced by Gucevičius's tutor Knackfus, is currently considered one of the most valuable classicist complexes in Lithuania.

In 1789, Gucevičius became a professor of architecture and topography at the Artillery and Engineering Corps' School of Vilnius. In 1794, he also returned to his alma mater, where he became a professor of civilian architecture and held the chair in engineering. In 1794, at the outbreak of Kościuszko's Uprising, Gucevičius joined the ranks of the local civil guard and took part in the Vilnius Uprising against the Russian garrison. He became one of the leaders of the local militia formed out of volunteers. Wounded in a skirmish near Ashmyany (modern Belarus), he was demobilised. Following the Partitions of Poland–Lithuania, when Vilnius was annexed by Imperial Russia, the new authorities expelled Gucevičius from the academy for his part in the uprising. However, in 1797, he returned there, this time as a head of the newly founded separate chair of architecture.

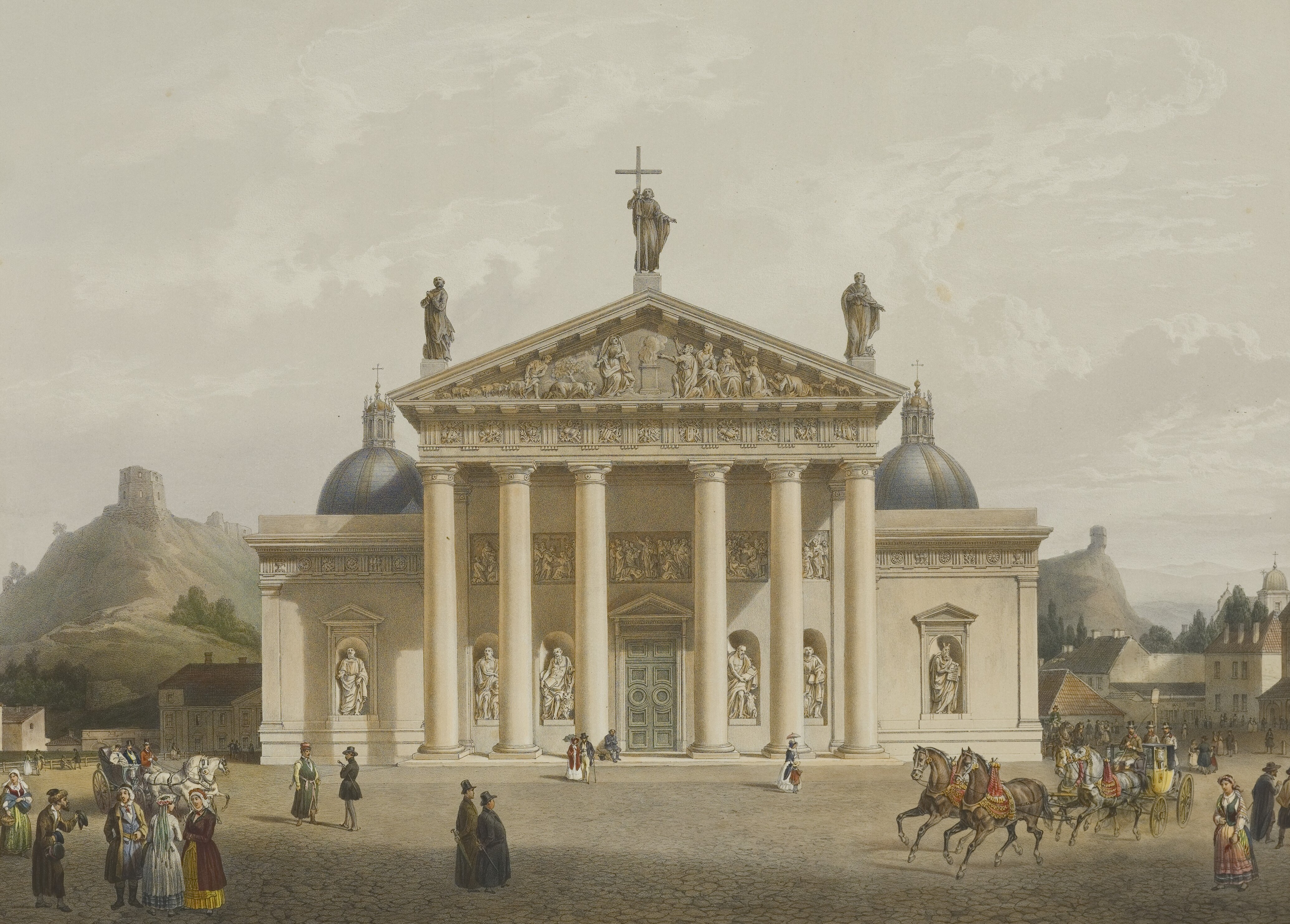
The façade of the Vilnius Cathedral, as seen in a mid-19th century picture

Around that time, Gucevičius created the most renowned of his works. First was the new town hall of Vilnius, completed around 1799. He also constructed a similar, yet smaller town hall in Vidzy (now in Belarus). Between 1777 and 1801, he worked to rebuild the Vilnius Cathedral (which had undergone many reconstructions and had been partially Baroque) in the neoclassical style. It is sometimes said that his reconstruction of the cathedral, modelled after a Roman temple, pre-dated the work of Thomas Hamilton and James Playfair, two notable Scottish architects to introduce classicism in the United Kingdom.

He is credited with several other projects, although their actual authorship is not documented. Among them is the palace of the Tyzenhauz family in Rokiškis (completed in 1801), the reconstruction of the castle in Raudonė for its contemporary owners, the Olędzki (Olendzki) h. Rawicz family, and the manor house in Čiobiškis. He is also thought to have prepared designs of palaces for other notable magnate families of the time, including Radziwiłł, Sapieha, Pac, Chomiński, and Scypion. However, World War II losses in the preserved archives make the matter difficult to settle definitively. Additionally, he designed several merchant houses in Kretinga. He was the author of a topographic map of the western part of the city of Vilnius.

He died on 10 December 1798. The location of his burial is unknown but is presumed to be the churchyard of the Church of St. Stephen in Vilnius. In his last will, he dedicated all of his projects to the Polish–Lithuanian Commonwealth, and some of the surviving sketches and designs are currently held in the library of Warsaw University.

== Legacy ==
The architect's life and creations inspired the Lithuanian poet Justinas Marcinkevičius to write the play The Cathedral.

== Notes ==
a. Polish: Wawrzyniec Gucewicz. His last will, written in Polish, which was the lingua franca of the Polish-Lithuanian Commonwealth, has the name Wawrzyniec Montrym Żakowicz Gucewicz. So, there exist sources that call him Polish.

== Sources ==
- Eduardas Budreika (1954). Architektas Laurynas Stuoka Gucevicius (in Lithuanian). Vilnius: Valst. Polit. Ir Moksl. Lit. L. p. 167.
- Eduardas Budreika (1965). "Laurynas Stuoka-Gucevicius, 1753-1798". Architektas Laurynas Stuoka Gucevicius (in Lithuanian). Kaunas: Mintis. p. 58.
- Eduardas Budreika (1982). "Laurynas Stuoka-Gucevicius, 1753-1798". Verkių rūmai (in Lithuanian). Vilnius: Mintis. p. 61.
- Lorentz, Stanisław (1961). "Wawrzyniec Gucewicz". Polski Słownik Biograficzny (in Polish). Vol. 9. Wrocław. pp. 133–135.
- Tomas Venclova (2006). "Ensemble of the Verkiai estate". Vilnius City Guide. Vilnius: R. Paknys Publishing House. p. 215.
