= Massalski (surname) =

Massalski (feminine: Massalska, plural: Massalscy) is a Polish language surname. It may refer to:

- Massalski family of Polish nobility
  - Aleksander Masalski (1593–1643), voivode of Mińsk Voivodship
  - Andrzej Massalski (died 1651), voivode of Mińsk Voivodship
  - Michał Józef Massalski, Great Hetman of Lithuania
  - Ignacy Jakub Massalski, Bishop of Wilno
  - Józef Adrian Massalski (1726–1765), marszałek of the Sejm
  - Helena Apolonia Massalska (1763–1815), diarist
  - Edward Tomasz Massalski (1799–1879), writer and publicist
  - Józef Massalski (1800–1845), poet
- Peter Massalski, East German slalom canoer
- Barbara Massalska (1927–1980), Polish artist

== See also ==
- Mosalsky (disambiguation)
