= Krugloye, Voronezh Oblast =

Krugloye Круглое
- Selo
- Location within Voronezh Oblast Location within Russia
- Coordinates: 51°19′N 39°17′E
- Country: Russia
- Region: Voronezh Oblast
- District: Kashirsky District
- Time zone: UTC+3:00

Krugloye (Russian: Круглое) is a rural locality (a selo) and the administrative center of Kruglyanskoye Rural Settlement, Kashirsky District, Voronezh Oblast, Russia. The population was 826 as of 2010. There are 13 streets.

== Geography ==
Krugloye is located 32 km southwest of Kashirskoye (the district's administrative centre) by road. Levaya Rossosh is the nearest rural locality.
