= Verkhneye Maryino =

Rural locality in Voronezh Oblast, Russia

Verkhneye Maryino Верхнее Марьино
- Selo
- Location within Voronezh Oblast Location within Russia
- Coordinates: 51°16′N 39°30′E
- Country: Russia
- Region: Voronezh Oblast
- District: Kashirsky District
- Time zone: UTC+3:00

Verkhneye Maryino (Russian: Верхнее Марьино) is a rural locality (a selo) and the administrative center of Starinskoye Rural Settlement, Kashirsky District, Voronezh Oblast, Russia. The population was 108 as of 2010.

== Geography ==
Verkhneye Maryino is located 23 km southwest of Kashirskoye (the district's administrative centre) by road. Dankovo is the nearest rural locality.
