= Biryuchenskoye =

Biryuchenskoye Бирюченское
- Selo
- Location within Voronezh Oblast Location within Russia
- Coordinates: 51°25′N 39°31′E
- Country: Russia
- Region: Voronezh Oblast
- District: Kashirsky District
- Time zone: UTC+3:00

Biryuchenskoye (Russian: Бирюченское) is a rural locality (a selo) in Kashirskoye Rural Settlement, Kashirsky District, Voronezh Oblast, Russia. The population was 148 as of 2010. There are 4 streets.

== Geography ==
Biryuchenskoye is located 7 km northwest of Kashirskoye (the district's administrative centre) by road. Kashirskoye is the nearest rural locality.
