= Kamenno-Verkhovka =

Kamenno-Verkhovka Каменно-Верховка
- Selo
- Location within Voronezh Oblast Location within Russia
- Coordinates: 51°21′N 39°08′E
- Country: Russia
- Region: Voronezh Oblast
- District: Kashirsky District
- Time zone: UTC+3:00

Kamenno-Verkhovka (Russian: Ка́менно-Верхо́вка) is a rural locality (a selo) and the administrative center of Kamenno-Verkhovskoye Rural Settlement, Kashirsky District, Voronezh Oblast, Russia. The population was 437 as of 2018. There are 18 streets.

== Geography ==
Kamenno-Verkhovka is located 46 km west of Kashirskoye (the district's administrative centre) by road. Borshchevo is the nearest rural locality.
