= Posyolok Ilyicha, Voronezh Oblast =

Posyolok Ilyicha Посёлок Ильича
- Settlement
- Location within Voronezh Oblast Location within Russia
- Coordinates: 51°12′N 39°41′E
- Country: Russia
- Region: Voronezh Oblast
- District: Kashirsky District
- Time zone: UTC+3:00

Posyolok Ilyicha (Russian: Посёлок Ильича) is a rural locality (a settlement) in Mozhayskoye Rural Settlement, Kashirsky District, Voronezh Oblast, Russia. The population was 283 as of 2010. There are 3 streets.

== Geography ==
The settlement is located 25 km south of Kashirskoye (the district's administrative centre) by road. Kommuna is the nearest rural locality.
