= Boyevo =

Boyevo Боево
- Selo
- Location within Voronezh Oblast Location within Russia
- Coordinates: 51°23′N 39°19′E
- Country: Russia
- Region: Voronezh Oblast
- District: Kashirsky District
- Time zone: UTC+3:00

Boyevo (Russian: Боево) is a rural locality (a selo) and the administrative center of Boyevskoye Rural Settlement, Kashirsky District, Voronezh Oblast, Russia. The population was 1,961 as of 2018. There are 18 streets.

== Geography ==
Boyevo is located 32 km west of Kashirskoye (the district's administrative centre) by road. Kolodezny is the nearest rural locality.
