= Levaya Rossosh =

Levaya Rossosh Левая Россошь
- Selo
- Location within Voronezh Oblast Location within Russia
- Coordinates: 51°20′N 39°24′E
- Country: Russia
- Region: Voronezh Oblast
- District: Kashirsky District
- Time zone: UTC+3:00

Levaya Rossosh (Russian: Левая Россошь) is a rural locality (a selo) and the administrative center of LevorosshanskoyeRural Settlement, Kashirsky District, Voronezh Oblast, Russia. The population was 1,054 as of 2018. There are 16 streets.

== Geography ==
Levaya Rossosh is located 18 km southwest of Kashirskoye (the district's administrative centre) by road. Starina is the nearest rural locality.
