= Kolomensky (inhabited locality) =

Kolomensky (Russian: Коломенский; masculine), Kolomenskaya (Коломенская; feminine), or Kolomenskoye (Коломенское; neuter) is the name of several rural localities in Russia:

- Kolomensky (rural locality), a settlement in Voznesenovskoye Rural Settlement of Talovsky District of Voronezh Oblast
- Kolomenskoye, Tula Oblast, a village in Mikhaylovskaya Volost of Kurkinsky District of Tula Oblast
- Kolomenskoye, Voronezh Oblast, a selo in Kondrashkinskoye Rural Settlement of Kashirsky District of Voronezh Oblast
- Kolomenskaya, a sloboda in Ozerensky Rural Okrug of Venyovsky District of Tula Oblast
