= Mosalskoye, Voronezh Oblast =

Mosalskoye Мосальское
- Selo
- Location within Voronezh Oblast Location within Russia
- Coordinates: 51°20′N 39°32′E
- Country: Russia
- Region: Voronezh Oblast
- District: Kashirsky District
- Time zone: UTC+3:00

Mosalskoye (Russian: Мосальское) is a rural locality (a selo) and the administrative center of Mosalskoye Rural Settlement, Kashirsky District, Voronezh Oblast, Russia. The population was 537 as of 2018. There are 8 streets.

== Geography ==
Mosalskoye is located 9 km southwest of Kashirskoye (the district's administrative centre) by road. Ryabchevo is the nearest rural locality.
