= Mosalsky (rural locality) =

Mosalsky (Russian: Мосальский; masculine), Mosalskaya (Мосальская; feminine), or Mosalskoye (Мосальское; neuter) is the name of several rural localities in Russia:

- Mosalskoye, Moscow Oblast, a village under the administrative jurisdiction of the work settlement of Fryanovo, Shchyolkovsky District, Moscow Oblast
- Mosalskoye, Voronezh Oblast, a selo in Mosalskoye Rural Settlement of Kashirsky District of Voronezh Oblast
