= Posyolok imeni Dzerzhinskogo =

Posyolok imeni Dzerzhinskogo Посёлок имени Дзержинского
- Settlement
- Location within Voronezh Oblast Location within Russia
- Coordinates: 51°27′N 39°13′E
- Country: Russia
- Region: Voronezh Oblast
- District: Kashirsky District
- Time zone: UTC+3:00

Posyolok imeni Dzerzhinskogo (Russian: Посёлок имени Дзержинского) is a rural locality (a settlement) and the administrative center of Dzerzhinskoye Rural Settlement, Kashirsky District, Voronezh Oblast, Russia. The population was 1,838 as of 2010. There are 18 streets.

== Geography ==
The settlement is located 42 km northwest of Kashirskoye (the district's administrative centre) by road. Voronezhsky is the nearest rural locality.
