= Kolomenskoye, Voronezh Oblast =

Kolomenskoye Коломенское
- Selo
- Location within Voronezh Oblast Location within Russia
- Coordinates: 51°26′N 39°40′E
- Country: Russia
- Region: Voronezh Oblast
- District: Kashirsky District
- Time zone: UTC+3:00

Kolomenskoye (Russian: Коломенское) is a rural locality (a selo) in Kondrashkinskoye Rural Settlement, Kashirsky District, Voronezh Oblast, Russia. The population was 229 as of 2010. There are 3 streets.

== Geography ==
Kolomenskoye is located 13 km northeast of Kashirskoye (the district's administrative centre) by road. Kondrashkino is the nearest rural locality.
