= Kolomensky =

Kolomensky (masculine), Kolomenskaya (feminine), or Kolomenskoye (neuter) may refer to:

- Kolomensky District, a district of Moscow Oblast, Russia
- Kolomensky (inhabited locality) (Kolomenskaya, Kolomenskoye), name of several rural localities in Russia
- Kolomenskoye, a former royal estate in Moscow, Russia
