= Czeslaw Znamierowski =

Lithuanian painter

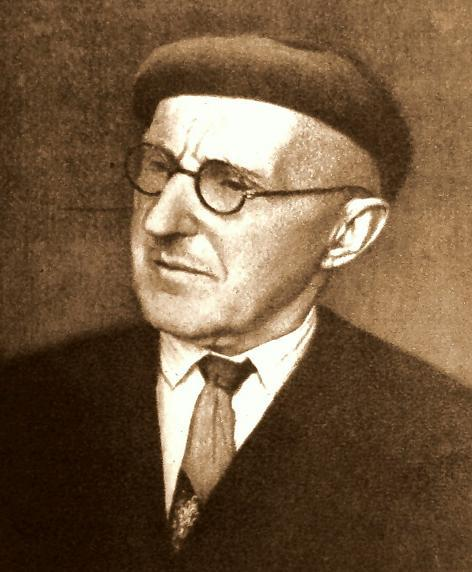
- Portrait of Czesław Znamierowski
- Born: 23 May 1890; Zatišje, Latvia, Russian Empire
- Died: 9 August 1977 (aged 87); Vilnius, Lithuania, Soviet Union
- Education: Imperial Academy of Arts, Vilnius University Faculty of Art
- Known for: Painting
- Notable work: Panorama of Vilnius City, The Green Lake
- Movement: Realism, Socialist realism
- Awards: Honorable Artist of LSSR
- Patrons: Ferdynand Ruszczyc, Arkady Rylov, Isaac Levitan Nicholas Roerich

Czeslaw Viktorovich Znamierowski (Note: There were several alternate spellings for his name, including Česlovas Znamierovskis or Česlovas Znamerovskis (Lithuanian spelling), Чеслав Знамеровский (Russian spelling), Cheslav Znamierovsky (English spelling), and Czeslaw Znamierowski or Czesław Znamierowski (Polish spelling). Because his parents were from Poland, Czeslaw Znamierowski adopted a Polish spelling of his name, and signed his artworks most often with "Cz. Znamierowski" as a signature. Other signatures used included "C. Znamierowski", "Czeslaw Znamierowski", and "C.Z." (most common for smaller artworks).) (23 May 1890 – 9 August 1977) was a renowned Soviet Lithuanian painter, a member of the Artists' Union of the USSR, known for his large artworks and love of nature. Znamierowski combined these two passions to create some of the most notable paintings in the Soviet Union, earning a prestigious title of "Honorable Artist of LSSR" in 1965. His works can be found in the Lithuanian Art Museum, Šiaulių „Aušros“ Museum, Warsaw National Gallery of Art, the Tretyakov Gallery as well as in known private collections and art funds.

Znamierowski was born in Zatišje, Ludza, in eastern Latvia, to a father who worked as a land-surveyor and a mother who was a music teacher. He attended the St. Petersburg Academy of Art twice between 1912 and 1917, and then attended Vilnius University from 1926 to 1929. He studied under Ferdynand Ruszczyc, Arkady Rylov, Isaac Levitan, and Nicholas Roerich. Znamierowski lived in Vilnius the remainder of his life, and often painted images of the cities landscapes. By 1965, he painted around 1,400 landscapes and made 800 sketches and over 3,000 artworks in his entire 50-year career as an artist.

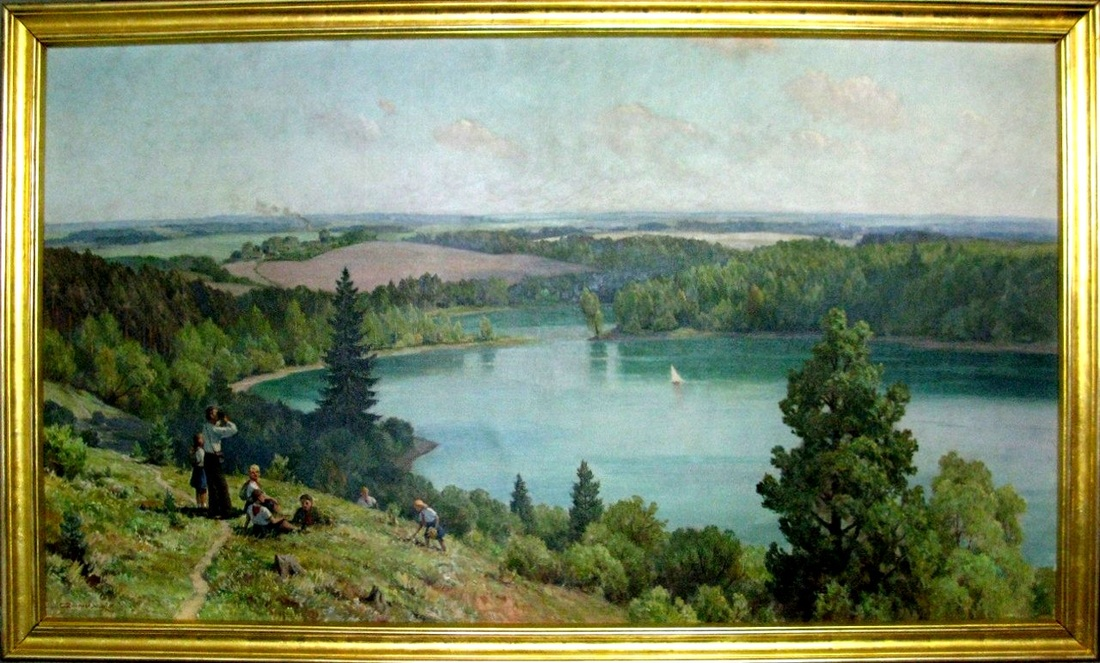
"The Green Lakes" by Czeslaw Znamierowski, oil on canvas, 145 × 250 cm, 1955. This is Znamierowski's second largest artwork ever created and the largest that survived to date. Located in the Tamoikin Art Fund.

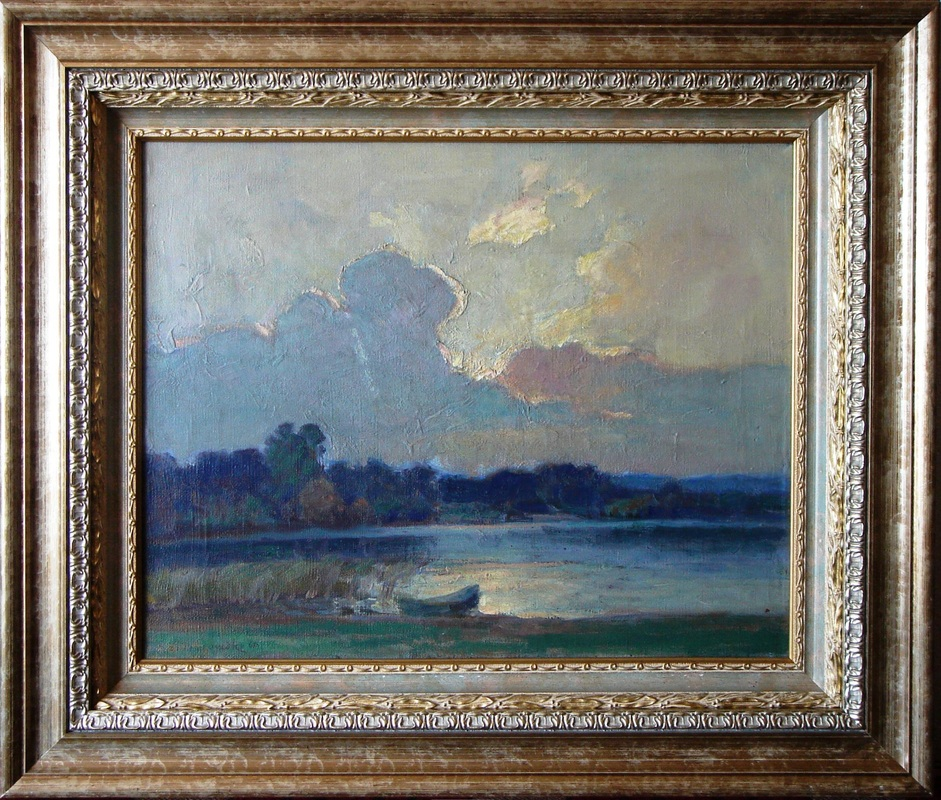
"Lake" by Czeslaw Znamierowski, oil on canvas, 45 × 56 cm, 1961, Tamoikin Art Fund

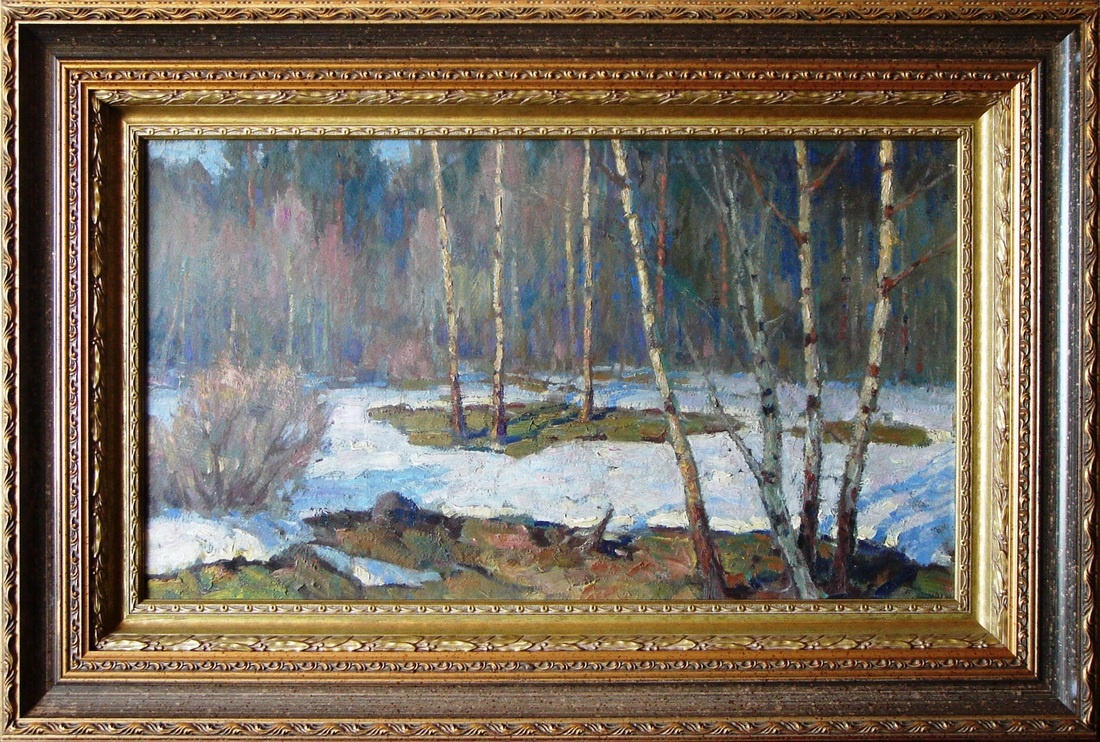
"Winter Forest" by Czeslaw Znamierowski, oil on board, 39.5 × 69.5 cm, 1970s, Tamoikin Art Fund

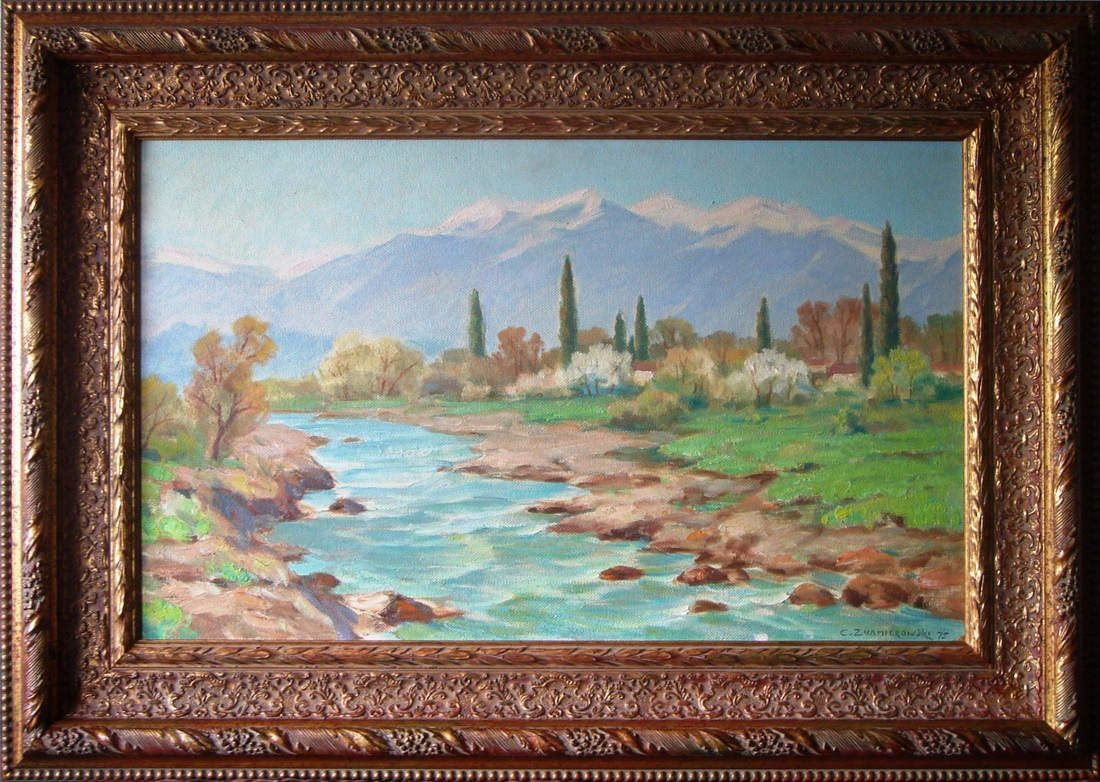
"Mountain River" by Czeslaw Znamierowski, oil on board, 39 × 69 cm, 1975, Tamoikin Art Fund

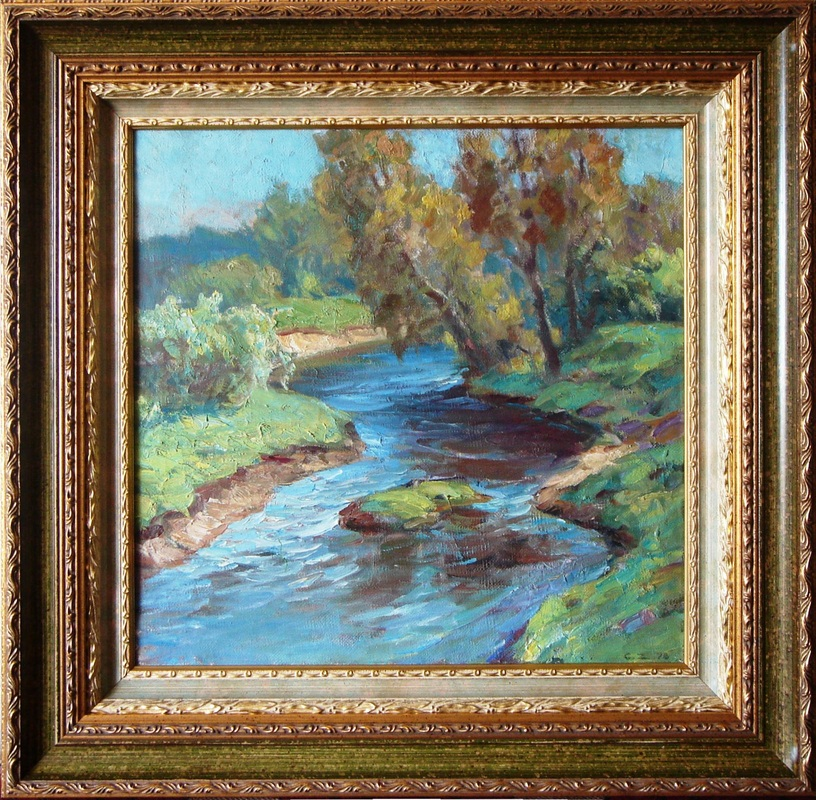
"River" by Czeslaw Znamierowski, oil on canvas, 49 × 49 cm, 1972, Tamoikin Art Fund

Znamierowski's art was popular at home and abroad. He was one of the few artists in the Soviet Union, whose art was allowed to leave The Iron Curtain. His artworks were sold to museums, state institutions, galleries and private collection of Lithuania, Latvia, Poland, Russia (within the Soviet Bloc) as well as USA, Canada, Germany, Sweden, Spain, France (outside the Soviet Bloc). It is very likely that his art was sold to many other countries: "His [Czeslaw Znamierowski's] works have been acquired by Lithuanian and foreign museums."

== History ==
Znamierowski was born on May 23, 1890, in Latvia in a small village of Zatishye (Lithuanian: Zatišje // Polish: Zacisze). The village itself was part of the rural district of Pilden, Ludza region, which bordered Latvia and Belarus. He was born into a poor but very artistic working-class Polish family. His father was a land-surveyor, and his mother was music and singing teacher, who occasionally painted as well. His grandfather, on the mother's side, was a sculptor, and his aunt (A. Bobrowicz) was a painter. As a child, growing up in rural Latvia, Czeslaw was surrounded by nature. The farmhouse where he lived was always abundant in flowers. His mother adored art and it was under her influence that Czeslaw first discovered painting. From that point on he never stopped. When he entered high school, in Daugavpils (Polish: Dzwinsk), his aunt was guiding him further in his art education. Being in high school, he met a student (A. Pliszko) from St. Petersburg Arts Academy. Pliszko perceived a talent in Czeslaw's artworks and invited him to St. Petersburg. After finishing high school Czeslaw collected all the money he could from selling his belongings and savings from various jobs to move to St. Petersburg. In 1911 Znamierowski arrived in St. Petersburg to continue his art education. In Znamierowski's words: "I did not hesitate much, I sold my bicycle, with the cash collected I bought a railway ticket and in 1911 I found myself in a building at Moika".

He was admitted into the "Society for the Encouragement of the Arts" located on Bolshaya Morskaya Street, not far from the Moika river. The society was headed by Nicholas Roerich (1874–1947), who guided Znamierowski in his art education in St. Petersburg. Shortly after Czeslaw began his studies, he had to withdraw himself from school, and go back home because of a difficult family situation. After over a year of the interruption Czeslaw came back to continue his studies. In 1915 Znamierowski was accepted into St. Petersburg Academy of Arts, where teachings of Arkady Rylov (1870–1939) and works of Isaac Levitan (1860–1900) had a strong impact on the young artist. However, his studies were cut short, this time by the 1917 Great October Revolution. In Znamierowski's words: "I could not be indifferent to what was happening. In Zatishye, I propagated among the peasants and was appointed as the secretary of the Public Committee of Peasants. In January 1918 the white guardsmen arrested me, I was in danger of being executed, I barely saved my life. I faced possible imprisonment, however, this couldn't hold me from continuing to take action."

After the October Revolution Znamierowski came back to Latvia. There he took an active part in establishing of the Soviet government, and for some time had worked as a chairman of Proletariat Culture of Liucen region. He also returned to the life of art, displaying his landscapes in Riga Art Gallery. In 1920 he started participating in more exhibitions and became a member of the Latvian Independent Artists Society as well as the Latvian Artists Union.

Znamierowski left Latvia in 1926, moving to the neighboring Poland, so he could again resume his art education. This time he applied and was admitted to the Vilnius University Faculty of Art, which at the time was under the management of a well-known artist, Ferdynand Ruszczyc (1870–1936). In order to relocate to Vilnius he had to sell everything he had including his family house in Latvia. The reason why Znamierowski entered Vilnius University was not because he lacked knowledge or skills, but because he specifically wanted to study with Prof. Ferdynand Ruszczyc and Prof. Aleksander Szturman. He finished his studies in 1929, however the move to Poland turned out to be a permanent one. He fell in love with the country, and although traveling extensively throughout his life, Vilnius was where he lived until his final days.

After finishing his studies and becoming an accomplished full-time artist, Znamierowski gained substantial popularity in Poland. Many of his paintings were acquired by Zacheta National Gallery of Art in Warsaw. In 1931 Czeslaw got an honor prize for his art, and in 1932, in Kraków he obtained an Honorary Diploma for his landscape painting "Before Rain". In 1933, again, his painting "Before Rain" won him a bronze medal in Zacheta National Gallery of Art exhibition called "Incentive". Znamierowski often took part in organizational and social activity. In 1933 he organized the first Vilnius Independent Artists Society, which played an important role in Lithuanian art history.

He continued to participate in exhibitions, social events and activities up until 1941 when the war broke out between Nazi Germany and the Soviet Union. His last exhibition before the war was in 1939 in Warsaw, just before it was invaded by the German forces. Znamierowski survived World War II, and even continued to paint during those difficult years, while helping with the war efforts. Here is what Znamierowski said to a reporter in a 1970 interview about that time period: "C.Z.: During the war I was still painting. When the bombarding of the town began, we were laying just here, in this room, one on top of the other on the floor. Reporter: Did you not hide the paintings? C.Z.: No. Reporter: And after the war? C.Z.: I painted, I painted, I painted."

In 1947 Znamierowski became a member of the LSSR Artists Union, and in 1965 he was awarded with a prestigious title of Honorable Artist of LSSR. Being an active supporter of Socialism, during an interview in 1970, here's what he said about the ideology and how it relates to his art: "My motto has always been the Lenin's principle, that art is for the people and must be widely comprehensible by all".

Throughout his life he traveled a lot, especially in the Caucasus, Crimea and Zakarpattia regions. From each trip he would bring between 20 and 25 canvasses.

On August 9, 1977, at the age of 87 the painter Znamierowski died. He was a professional artist for his entire life. Czeslaw was laid to rest at the St. Peter's and St. Paul's Church graveyard in Vilnius city.

== Znamierowski's House ==
"This house—is a piece of art. That is why it resisted trends and reconstructions, and it was left to enjoy the eyes all walking and driving by. We have to mention though that besides art Czeslaw Znamierowski is engaged in floriculture and receives a yearly distinction from the Town Council."

In Vilnius, Czeslaw lived and worked his entire life in the same house located on 15 Antakalnis street. That house was a representation of the artist and brought him certain fame in the city. As a painter and a lover of flowers, Znamierowski redecorated the front yard into one of the most beautiful gardens in the city, attracting a lot of attention in the summer months. His garden contained different variety of roses, gerberas, dahlias and many other flowers.

Although the house does not exist anymore, during Czeslaw's life, due to his gardening efforts the house was considered a piece of art, and one of the city's unofficial touring sights. Some local residents and tourists took a trolley or a bus to see the charming garden on the hill with a lively old man bustling in between the flowers. Because of this, the house resisted all reconstruction trends, which were popular in the Soviet Union, especially after World War II. Znamierowski's engagement in floriculture got him a yearly distinction from the town council. He continued maintaining his garden until he died.

== Accomplishments ==
- In 1930 Znamierowski established the first Independent Artists Society in Vilnius, which was an important event in Lithuanian art history.
- Znamierowski was one of the first artists who started painting monumental panoramic landscapes of the Soviet Lithuania, many of which decorated interiors of state buildings not only in Soviet Lithuania but USSR at large.
- Znamierowski created over 3000 artworks in his 50-year career as an artist.
- Znamierowski's biggest canvas was called "Panorama of Vilnius City". It was 8 meters wide by 2.5 meters tall, and was exhibited in Moscow in the pavilion of the Lithuanian SSR at the Exhibition of National Economic Achievements.
- For his artistic accomplishments Znamierowski received two honorary diplomas from the Supreme Presidium Committee of Lithuanian SSR.
- In 1965 Znamierowski became an Honorable Artist of LSSR.
- From 1970 to 1977 Znamierowski was the eldest living artist of Vilnius city.

== Exhibitions ==
"Znamierowski obtained diplomas and medals many times. He had exhibitions in Warsaw, Moscow, London and also beyond, in Europe and America. His paintings were bought with willingness."

Exhibitions were very personal to Znamierowski. He felt that an exhibition of his art is a "confession" of his entire life. After nearly 50 years of being a professional artist, Znamierowski had a substantial amount of small and large exhibitions in some of the most prominent national museums and galleries of the Soviet Union. He had seven major solo exhibitions in Vilnius and Warsaw. Znamierowski's artworks were exhibited in Riga, Ludza, Vilnius, Kraków, Warsaw, Moscow, St. Petersburg and many other cities in USSR.

A large painting of Vilnius City created by Znamierowski took the center stage in the LSSR pavilion during the Exhibition of National Economic Achievements in Moscow. Other prominent locations where Znamierowski's paintings were exhibited include: The National Museum of Riga, Vilnius University, National Art Museum of Lithuania, National Art Gallery of Lithuania, Vilnius Exhibition Place, State Gallery of Kraków, Warsaw Art Gallery, Zacheta National Gallery of Art and others.

List of Znamierowski's exhibitions that were confirmed through public records:

- 1920 – Riga National Museum, Latvia

"In 1920 I took part for the first time in an exhibition in Riga. I remember, the Swedish Association of the Independent Artists bought two paintings." – C. Znamierowski

- 1929 – Vilnius University, Lithuania

In 1929, upon graduation from Vilnius University, Znamierowski arranged an exhibition of his artworks. "The dearest things are always those that occur for the first time in life. In 1929 I arranged the first one-man exhibition in Vilnius and exhibited about 60 artworks" – C. Znamierowski

- 1931 – State Gallery of Kraków, Poland

In 1931 during an exhibition held by the State Gallery of Kraków, Znamierowski received an honor prize for his paintings.

- 1932 – State Gallery of Kraków, Poland

In 1932 in an art contest in Kraków he received an art diploma for his landscape painting "Before Rain".

- 1933 – Zacheta National Gallery of Art, Warsaw, Poland

In 1933 at an exhibition called "Incentive" organized by the Zacheta National Gallery of Art C. Znamierowski won a bronze medal, once again for his painting "Before Rain".

- 1936 – State Gallery of Vilnius, Lithuania

In 1936 Znamierowski organized yet another solo exhibition.

- 1939 – Zacheta National Gallery of Art, Warsaw, Poland

"In 1939 my last pre-war exhibition took place." – C. Znamierowski

- 1947 – The State Tretyakov Gallery. "1947 UNION-WIDE ART EXHIBITION - Fine Art, Sculpture, Graphic arts"

C. Znamierowski's first participation in a major post war exhibition along other known Soviet artists and sculptors.

- 1954 – Vilnius Art Museum, Lithuania

In 1954, Znamierowski held another one-man exhibition in Vilnius, Lithuania

- 1960 – National Economic Achievements Exhibition, Moscow, Russia

Znamierowski's biggest canvas was called "Panorama of Vilnius City". It was 8 meters wide by 2.5 meters tall, and was exhibited in Moscow in the pavilion of the Lithuanian SSR at the Exhibition of National Economic Achievements.

- 1962 – Vilnius Exhibition Palace, Lithuania

In 1962 Znamierowski held the largest one-man exhibitions to date.

- 1970 – Vilnius Art Museum, Lithuania

In August 1970, Znamierowski held a solo anniversary exhibition celebrating his 80th birthday and 50 years as a professional artist. Exhibition turned out to be again his largest to date. Over 300 paintings were exhibited, representing more than 40 years of work.

- 1975 – Vilnius State Gallery

In celebration of his 85 birthday Znamierowski held a one-man exhibition in Vilnius city.

- 1976 – Warsaw Art Gallery, Poland

In September 1976 Znamierowski's last major exhibition took place in Warsaw Art Gallery. Fifty artworks were presented. Znamierowski gave an interview to a reporter not long before that exhibition, here's what he said: "I am preparing an exhibition sale in the Warsaw Art Gallery which will take place in the middle of September. I organize such exhibitions very often. This year I will display 50 canvasses."

Note: this is not at complete list of C. Znamierowski's exhibitions.

== Art ==
As an artist, Znamierowski was most known for two things – social realism and nature. Although an active communist, about 90 percent of his artworks had nothing to do with the Soviet agenda and were focused primarily on the beauty of natural environment around him. Znamierowski strived and was able to depict constantly changing mood of nature which showed many impressionist tendencies in his art. Znamierowski greatly excelled in large landscapes and cityscapes, which took a major place in his artistic career. Many of such artworks were of monumental panoramic size, often depicting people in them. Art critics stated that landscapes were where the artist revealed himself the most.

The love for nature was instilled in him early on by the place of his birth and by his mother's love for flowers and gardening. Growing up in a small Latvian village, from early childhood he started to admire the changing colors of the seasons, the beauty of the fields, forests, lakes and rivers. Because of his mother's flowers garden, he became an avid lover of flowers, creating many still-life paintings and sketches, as if always striving to reveal their natural beauty to the world. He was also very fond of painting quiet corners of nature, especially the early spring when snow melted and nature awoke. In such artworks he made every effort to capture the impression of space, limpidity of water, firmness of ice and delicacy of the new grass. A favorite motif of the painter was a meandering river in the landscape, sometimes represented in a wide panoramic view, and sometimes in an intimate and romantic way.

Over all the theme of the countryside takes a major part in his art and especially large panoramic paintings such as "Panorama of Vilnius City" and "The Green Lakes" in which the painter delicately reveals the beauty of nature. Znamierowski described his love of nature and the desire to recreate it on the canvas in the following way: "I want to approach nature as close as possible so one could take a walk in my picture. I want my art to convey the mood so it would be possible to tell the season or even the time of the day".

Vilnius: Znamierowski was extremely fond of depicting Vilnius, its surroundings, rivers and lakes. He became greatly attracted to the hills, valleys and evergreen pine forests of Lithuanian capital. Theme of Vilnius countryside makes up a significant part in his artworks. Almost all of his major paintings are related to Vilnius city.

Discipline: After being a professional artist for over 50 years and creating more than 3000 artworks, when asked about discipline Znamierowski said "This is not for me. If it clings—I can paint for hours without stopping. If it doesn't – I may not work for a couple of weeks".

Painting: Znamierowski painted primarily in three styles, often intermixing them together – realism, romanticism, impressionism. From very early on Znamierowski was greatly influenced by academic style of Russian art and realism in general, which was infused in him by his teachers (A. Rylov, A. Dubovskoy) in St. Petersburg Academy of Arts. When working he applied the paint gently, then would step back a little, look at it under different perspective, and then apply another brushstroke. He tried to absorb the mystery of creation and never rush himself to finish his work. Although his meticulous approach to art never changed, by the mid-60s his technique started to show significant changes, his stroke became wider and faster, the colors are more bright and their range more complex. The impressionism within the artist began to show more than ever. His artworks also became more emotional, colorful and romantic. A well known Lithuanian art writer, critic and artist, Augustinas Savickas said the following about Znamierowski in his book (Landscape in Lithuanian Painting, 1965) "By his attitude toward nature, his style is close to the "hedonistic" trend. ... In the sketches painted directly from nature he is more sensitive and tender, while in large canvases he idealizes nature and tries to make it more beautiful."

Color and mood: Znamierowski was very sensitive to the beauty of nature, subtly grasping its specifics and feeling the rhythm of the composition. He was never limited to one type of scenery, state of weather or time of the year. Some of his artworks are dark and gloomy (ex: "Storm Clouds") while others are cheerful and bright, especially when he painted the seaside in Palanga and the Black Sea (ex: "Wind from the Sea"). "I like winter, water and particularly the sea – it so colorful." – C. Znamierowski.

Genres: Znamierowski worked in different genres such as portrait, still-life landscapes, cityscapes, architectural sites and other compositions. He was considered a great master of this profession and received many orders. When he went to paint, he often brought back not one, but three or four sketches which later in his studio he used to develop, improve and carefully recreate every detail. Znamierowski was drawn to large, panoramic and even epic artworks, and painted a number of them in his lifetime. He was one of the first artists who started to paint panoramic landscapes of Soviet Lithuania, which were intended to be used for decorating the interiors of public buildings. Large artworks created in the 1950s and 60s can be considered as one of the most characteristic paintings of this type. More notable of them are: "Panorama of Vilnius City", "Salute in Vilnius" and "The Green Lakes".

Other talents: Znamierowski had many other talents. He was well versed in wood-carving, architecture, carpentry, floriculture. He made his own frames and even carved wooded sculptures for his garden. Znamierowski managed to approach everything independently and achieve perfect quality in almost all things he tried. Regardless of what form of art he engaged in, he deeply believed that art had to be beautiful and reflect the environment of a specific time period.

== Artworks ==
"He devoted all his vigor and talent to art. You will find many of his paintings not only in the museums and institutions of Lithuania, but also in Latvia, USA, Sweden, Germany, as well as in private homes."

"Czeslaw Znamierowski's art covers thousands of landscapes, portraits, architectural sites. His paintings are located in many museums and art galleries; they can be found abroad as well. Sir Czeslaw did not obey vanity, he was not looking for fame, but he was a painter of uncommon reputation."

Znamierowski's art was popular at home and abroad. He was one of the few artists in the Soviet Union, whose art was allowed to leave The Iron Curtain. His artworks were sold to museums, state institutions, galleries and private collection of Lithuania, Latvia, Poland, Russia (within Soviet Bloc) as well as USA, Canada, Germany, Sweden, Spain, France (outside Soviet Bloc) It is very likely that his art was sold to many other countries: "His [Czeslaw Znamierowski's] works have been acquired by Lithuanian and foreign museums."

By 1965 Znamierowski created between 2,000 and 2,400 artworks, and by 1976 that number reached over 3,000 (paintings and sketches).

| Znamierowski's artworks in Lithuanian Art Museum (Note: All works in this column are found in the Directory of Lithuanian painting (1940–1990)) | Large panoramic artworks | Other known artworks: |
|---|---|---|
| Fireworks, 1947, oil on canvas, 100 × 150 cm, Sig.: C Znamierowski | Panorama of Vilnius City, 1950s, 8 m × 2.5m [largest artwork] | Before Storm, 1932 |
| Night on the River, 1952–1953, oil on canvas., 112 × 144 cm, Sig.: C. ZNAMIEROWSKI 52-53 | The Green Lakes, 1955, oil on canvas, 1.45m × 2.5m, Sig.:C. Znamierowski 55 [second largest artwork] | Storm Clouds, 1933 |
| Caucasus Mountains, 1953, oil on canvas, 80 × 105 cm, Sig.: C. ZNAMIEROWSK 53 | Before Rain, 1930 | Night above the River, 1943 |
| First Show, 1954, oil on canvas, 130 × 200 cm, Sig.: Cz. ZNAMIEROWSKI 54 | The Victory Day Celebration in Vilnius, 1950 | Salute in Vilnius, 1957 |
| Vilnius. Valakampių, 1955, 25 × 31 cm, Sig.:C. Z. | Panorama of the Neris River, 1949 | Vilnele: The Last Snow, 1960 |
| Forest Stream in Winter , 1955, oil on canvas, 73x116cm, Sig.:C. ZNAMIEROWSKI | The Nemunas, 1956 | Autumn's Motif, 1969 |
| Spring Stream, 1955, oil on board, 24.5x31cm, Sig.: CZ 55 | Salute in Vilnius, 1957 | The First Snow, 1974 |
| Fishing Port in Klaipeda, 1958, oil on canvas, 125x195cm, Sig.:Cz. Znamierowski 58 | Control of the Neris Flow, 1959 | March, 1974 |
| VILNELĖ, 1958, oil on canvas, 100 × 126 cm, Sig.: ZNAMIEROWSKI 58 | In Klaipeda Fishing Port, 1959 | Spring Motif |
| Autumn etude, 1958, oil on canvas, 40 × 53 cm | Declaration of Soviet Power in Vilnius in 1918 [ a.k.a. V. Kapsukas Declares Soviet Power in Lithuania] | Lenin Square in Vilnius |
| Sea, 1958, oil on canvas, 56 × 31 cm, Sig.: CZ 58 | Building of Bridge across the Neris | With Catch |
| Neris in spring, 1959, oil on canvas, 89.5 × 146 cm, Sig.: Cz. ZNAMIEROWSKIS 59 | The Neris in Vilnius | The Neris |
| Early Snow, 1959, oil on canvas, 89 × 167 cm, Sig.: C ZNAMIEROWSKI 59 | Palanga Dunes | Wind from the Sea |
| Palangos Dunes, 1959, oil on canvas, 80 × 150 cm, Sig.: Č. Znamierovkis 59 | With Catch | The Neris in Autumn |
| Palangos Beach, 1959, oil on canvas, 85 × 146 cm, Sig.: Č. Znamierowski 59 | | Cold Morning |
| Tatras, 1959, oil on canvas, 89 × 131 cm, Sig.: Cz. Znamierowski 59 | | Winter in Mountains |
| Portrait of the Socialist Labor Hero O. STANŽIENĖS, 1960, oil on canvas, 120 × 90 cm, Sig. Cz. Znamierowski 60 | | Chosta. A Park Fragment |
| MOTYVAl EVENING, 1960, oil on canvas, 54 × 72 cm, Sig.: Cz. Znamierowski 60 | | Sea Motif |
| NEMUNAS, 1961, oil on canvas, 78 × 13 cm, Sig.: Cz. Znamierowski 61 | | Wife's Portrait |
| Autumn motif (VILNELĖ.RUDUO), 1961, oil on canvas, 73 × 117 cm, Sig.: ZNAMIEROWSKI 61 | | Sketch |
| VILNELĖ Yesterday, 1963, oil on canvas, 79 × 147 cm, Sig.: Cz. Znamierowski 63 | | Flowers |
| Sea – Sunset, 1963, oil on canvas, 80 × 116 cm, Sig.: Cz. Znamierowski 63 | | Dahlias |
| DVARČIONIŲ Brickyard Quarry, 1964, oil on canvas, 105 × 150 cm, Sig.: Cz. Znamierowski 64 | | Waterfall |
| ANTAKALNIO BRIDGE CONSTRUCTION, 1965, oil on canvas, 73 × 170 cm, Sig.: Cz. Znamierowski 65 | | Moonlight Night |
| Silenced, 1965, oil on canvas, 76 × 131 cm, Sig.: Cz. Znamierowski 65 | | By the river Wilia |
| Coach, 1967, oil on canvas, 89 × 146 cm, Sig.: Cz. Znamierowski 67 | | After the Rain |
| Tatras. EYE OF THE SEA, 1967, oil on canvas, 102 × 112 cm, Sig.: Cz. ZNAMIEROWSKI 67 | | Portrait of Marshal Grzeczko in the Officers House |
| Vilnius Surroundings, 1967, oil on canvas, 116 × 97 cm | | Portrait of lawyer Krištapovič, 1950 |
| Baltic Sea, 1968, oil on canvas, 80 × 135 cm, Sig.: C. Znamierowski 68 | | Soldier's portrait, 1949, 115 × 70 cm |
| NEMUNAS, 1969, oil on canvas, 75 × 150 cm, Sig.: Cz. Znamierowski 69 | | Snowy rooftop, oil on board, 21 × 27 cm |
| HIGH VOLTAGE, 1969, oil on canvas, 86 × 110 cm, Sig.: Cz. ZNAMIEROWSKI 69 | | |
| Sea, 1969, oil on canvas, 47 × 130 cm, Sig.: Cz. Znamierowski 69 | | |
| Portrait of ANTANAS SNIECKUS, 1974, oil on board, 30 × 32 cm | | |
| The Birch, 1970s, oil on board, 44 × 37 cm | | |

== Personality ==
Znamierowski was known for his joyful personality, outer calmness and great inner emotions which he had expressed through his art. He was described as a caring and generous person. People that knew him said he was always in a good mood, full of energy and creativity. Even after his 80th birthday, he was young at heart and full of optimism. Znamierowski was also an idealist who saw good in the world around him. Some art critics saw hedonistic trends in his art. He had sustainable work ethics, dedication and commitment to art which showed through over 3,000 paintings that he created during his lifetime, many of which were of a very large panoramic size. He managed to approach everything independently, and to achieve perfect quality in almost all things he tried his hand at. He was remarkable for his unusual diligence; his short sleep was his only break. On the outside, Znamierowski was very much a public figure. He performed in theater, participated in exhibitions, gave interviews and was a published art critic. In private life, he lived and worked in a seclusion of his home, noticed by almost no one. Despite this, his artworks remain a model of sincerity and consistency. Other than painting he had two other passions – flowers and pigeons. They were his life hobbies that he never gave up throughout his entire life. Wherever he lived, he always found a way to breed pigeons. The beautiful birds helped him preserve his mental equilibrium, serenity and peace of mind. The birds gave him harmony in life and stimulated his imagination. Flowers also accompanied him through his whole life. Roses, asters, peonies, orchids, dahlias and dozens of other sorts of flowers were an inseparable part of the painter's home surroundings in Antakalnis. Znamierowski never drank alcohol. He used to say that when in his childhood he saw the hideousness of drunken people, he – a man inseparably connected with a beauty – decisively discerned this aspect of ugliness.

== Multiculturalism ==
"For him [Czeslaw Znamierowski] there were no boundaries between nationalities. He readily made friends with the natives of any country.... He was no stranger to Latvians, Lithuanians, Jews, Tatars, Karaites, Russians. He was ready to help everyone if possible."

Due to his intentional and unintentional multiculturalism, Znamierowski is considered a national artist of four countries – Latvia, Lithuania, Poland and Russia.

Latvia's claim – Znamierowski was born, schooled and took up art in Latvia. His entire family lived there, and it is the country where his career as an artist began. Znamierowski was fluent in Latvian.

Lithuania's claim – From 1926 until his death in 1977 Znamierowski resided in Vilnius, Lithuania. Most of his artworks were dedicated to and about this country. He was awarded a title of Honorable Artist of LSSR. Znamierowski learned, read, wrote, and spoke fluent Lithuanian, but above that, he accepted Lithuania, and especially Vilnius (capital) as his home.

Poland's claim – Although residing in Latvia, and later in Lithuania, Znamierowski's family was ethnically Polish, making his nationality also Polish; "Czeslaw Znamierowski" is a Polish name, and Znamierowski clearly made a point of spelling it in a Polish way (Example of Lithuanian spelling: Česlovas Znamierovskis) on many of his artworks, even those that were painted in (and dedicated to) Lithuania. Further more the artist kept close ties and was exhibited numerously in Poland (see chapter Exhibitions). Znamierowski was fluent in Polish.

Russia's claim – Technically, Znamierowski was born in the Imperial Russia (which Latvia was part of at that time). He was fluent in Russian and for several years lived and received his highest art education in St. Petersburg (Russia). He was most influenced and painted in what can be called Russian realism and Russian academic style. In addition Znamierowski was a supporter of communism which was a vivid connection to Russia, where the ideology was the strongest. Because of these factors, to date he is perceived by many as a Soviet Russian artist.
