= Green Lakes =

Green Lakes can refer to one of the following:

- Green (Žalieji) Lakes north of Vilnius in Lithuania
- "Green Lakes" towers in Dubai, United Arab Emirates
- Green Lakes State Park, a state park in central New York
