= Pranas Hiksa =

Lithuanian businessman

Captain Pranas Hiksa
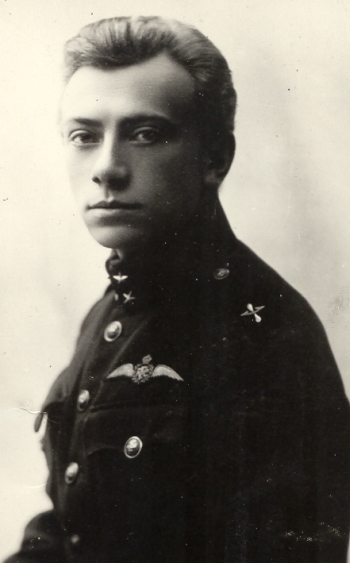
- Born: 23 May 1897; Verkiai Palace, Vilna Governorate, Russian Empire
- Died: 4 April 1966 (aged 68); Kaunas, Lithuanian SSR, Soviet Union
- Spouse: Irena Salominaitė (1909–1996)
- Children: 4
- Military career
- Allegiance: Lithuania
- Service years: 1916–1917 (Russian Imperial Army); 1919–1922 (Lithuanian Army)
- Rank: Captain
- Known for: First military Lithuanian pilot

Pranas Hiksa (23 May 1897 – 4 April 1966) was a Lithuanian businessman, car racer, and captain of the Lithuanian Army who was the first Lithuanian military pilot. Due to his successful racing and business career, Hiksa was a known millionaire in interwar Lithuania.

== Biography ==
=== Early life ===
Pranas Hiksa was born on 23 May 1897 in the Verkiai Palace in the Vilna Governorate of the Russian Empire. In 1900 his family moved to another manor at Norvaišiai near Šiauliai, where he was educated at the Šiauliai Men's Gymnasium. Later he attended the Liepāja commercial school. In 1905, Hiksa's mother died, soon followed by his father. Hiksa was subsequently raised by his adopted sister's Ona Zubovienė's family.

=== World War I ===
During World War I, he lived with his adoptive family in their residence in Moscow, where he attended the Tsarevich Alexei Commercial School and also finished drivers' courses in 1915. On 1 October 1916, he began his military service in the Russian Imperial Army's 23rd Army Corps Aviation Detachment stationed near Riga. On December 3, he was sent to the Gatchina Military Flying School. On 17 February 1917, he was made praporschik, and on 15 September he and a few others were sent to continue studying aviation at the Royal Flying Corps in England, from which he graduated on 7 September with the rank of aviation lieutenant. After the October Revolution in Russia, Hiksa moved back to Lithuania.

=== Lithuanian army ===
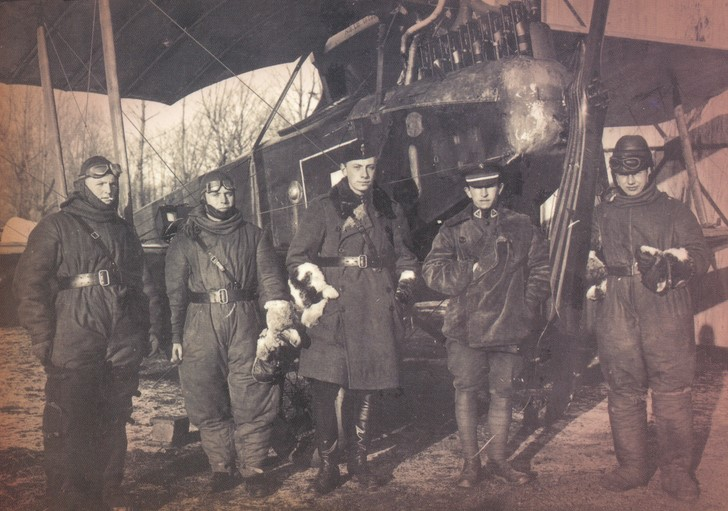
Pranas Hiksa (center) and other student pilots in 1921

On 15 May 1919, he was mobilized into the Lithuanian Army and assigned to its aviation unit, subsequently becoming the army's first pilot. On 6 June 1919, he became an officer. Hiksa participated in the Lithuanian Wars of Independence near Panevėžys, Zarasai, Utena and Suvalkai as a reconnaissance pilot. Hiksa is known to have been shot down a few times while on duty. He lectured in the Lithuanian War Aviation School (Karo aviacijos mokykla). On 22 November 1919, he was made senior lieutenant. On 27 November he was appointed as the head of the aviation training squad, and on 16 April 1920 became air squadron chief. Notable students of Hiksa included Jurgis Dobkevičius, Antanas Gustaitis, and Jonas Mikėnas. On 3 June 1922, he was promoted to captain, and three months later on 25 September was discharged from the army to study.

=== Business and racing career ===
After briefly studying mechanics at Vytautas Magnus University, Hiksa became a commissioner of the Ūkio bankas bank to the construction of the factory Maistas, later famously becoming its production director. From 1924 to 1928 Hiksa worked as the factory's export-import broker in Czechoslovakia and other European countries. From 1926 he was a member of the Automobile Club of Lithuania. He studied in Prague and in 1928 received an engineering diploma, after which he established his own company P. Hiksa. Praha 2, Příčná 9, which represented the Maistas factory in Czechoslovakia, the Weimar Republic, and Austria. After returning to Kaunas, the temporary capital of Lithuania, he worked in a metal factory as chief engineer. From 1928 to 1940 he was vice-president of the Aeroclub of Lithuania. Hiksa's business endeavors abroad won various equipment contracts for the Lithuanian army, postal as well as railroad services.

Hiksa won President Antanas Smetona's trophy prize in the first organized Lithuanian car races "Around Lithuania" (Aplink Lietuvą) in 1931 and 1932. In Kaunas, Hiksa built a pavilion that sold American automobiles. In 1933 and 1935 he participated in the Monte Carlo Rally.

=== World War II ===
He was briefly mobilized to the war aviation unit in 1939 from 18 September to 9 October. After Soviet Union occupied Lithuania in 1940, Hiksa was briefly mobilized into the Soviet Red Army. During Soviet occupation, Hiksa worked small jobs such as engineer or mechanic in various farms, but nonetheless was watched and persecuted by Soviet authorities for his background. During Nazi occupation, Hiksa was eventually allowed to fly again as a wartime pilot near Daugavpils.

=== Death ===
Hiksa died on 4 April 1966 in Kaunas, and was buried in the Petrašiūnai Cemetery.

== Personal life ==
A polyglot (speaking the German, Russian, Polish, and Czech languages), Hiksa was married to Irena Salominaitė (1909–1996), who was a translator in Kaunas and a teacher of Russian and German. They had daughters Ina Taletienė (born 1934), Danutė Vaitiekūnienė (born 1937), Rita Šniukienė (born 1944), and Jūratė Veiverienė (born 1946).

== Remembrance ==
A book about Hiksa entitled Gyvenimas kaip skrydis was released in 1996 and re-published in 2014. In 1999 designer Gediminas Karpavičius designed an envelope portrait of Hiksa. In 2000 a memorial plaque was uncovered at the Lithuanian War Aviation Memorial. In 2012, a memorial plaque was uncovered on his former house.
