= Mosalsky =

Mosalsky (masculine), Mosalskaya (feminine), or Mosalskoye (neuter) may refer to:

- Mosalsky District, a district of Kaluga Oblast, Russia
- Mosalsky (rural locality) (Mosalskaya, Mosalskoye), name of several rural localities in Russia
- Massalski family or Mosalsky, Polish-Lithuanian princely family
