= Verkiai Regional Park =

Park in Lithuania

- IUCN category V (protected landscape/seascape)
- Holy Trinity Church in Verkiai Regional Park

- Location within Lithuania
- Location: Vilnius city municipality, Lithuania
- Nearest city: Vilnius
- Coordinates: 54°46′50″N 25°19′50″E
- Area: 2,673 ha (6,610 acres)
- Established: 1992

Verkiai Regional Park is one of the Regional Parks in Lithuania. It is located almost entirely in Verkiai elderate of Vilnius municipality.

The park was established in 1992 in order to protect natural complexes of the Green (Žalieji) Lakes and cultural complexes of Verkiai Palace and a park, Kalvarijos and Trinapolis as well as other valuables. The park occupies 2,673 ha (compared to 5,565 ha of the elderate), being one of the biggest city parks in the world. Forests cover 76.5%, reserves occupy 52.7%, and 23.9% of the territory is designated for recreation.

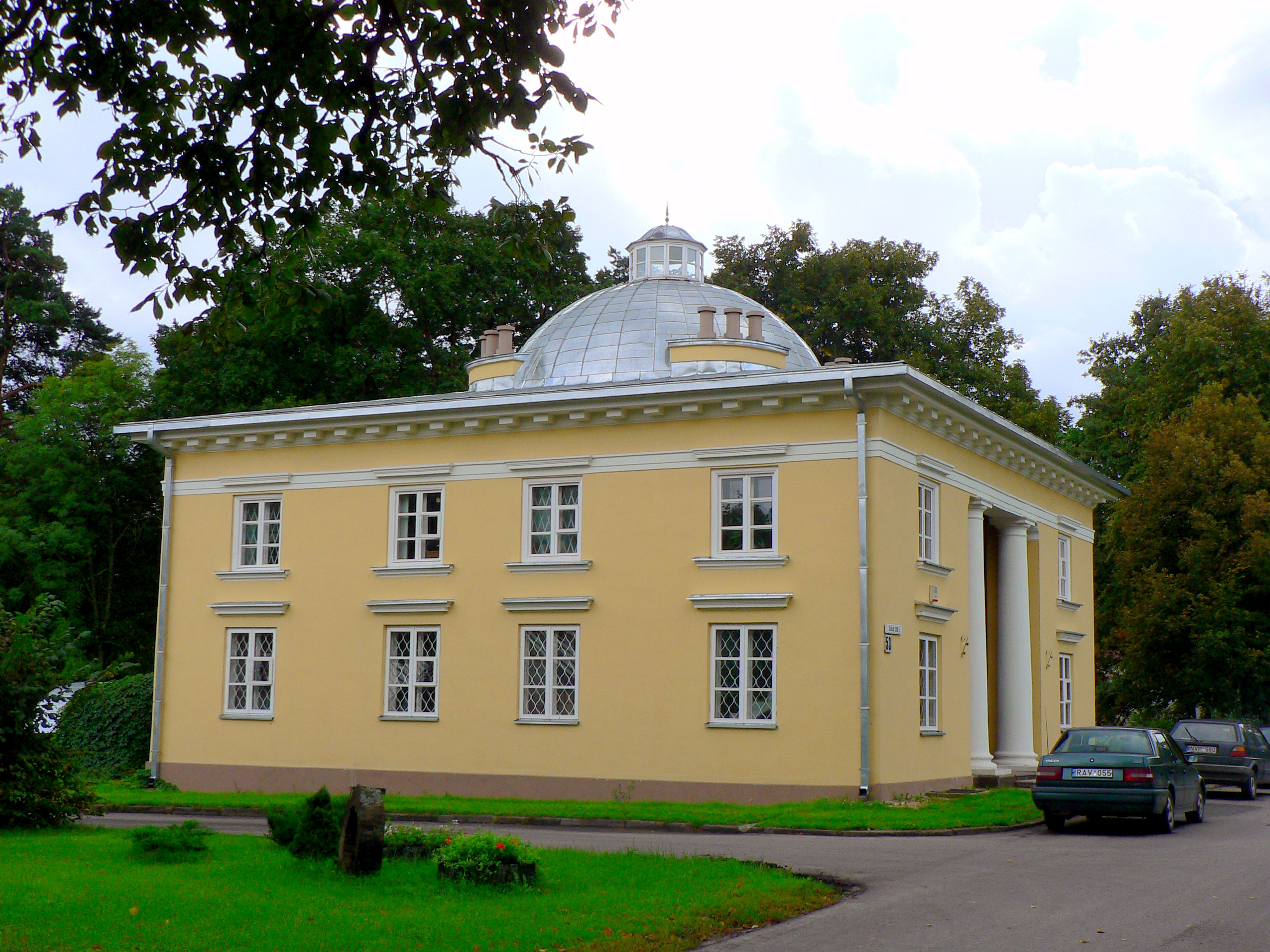
The Park administration building in the "Small Palace" pavillon, originally designed by Laurynas Gucevičius

Verkiai Calvary were established in the 17th century. The Calvary was completed in 1669 by the supervision of Dominican friars. It was constructed following the plan of Jerusalem, with the distances, water bodies and elevations being very close to the original. New chapels were constructed in the 18th century in Baroque style. Verkiai Calvary consists of 22 chapels, 7 wooden and brick gates, and two church ensembles. The Calvary have been visited by Christian worshipers from Vilnius region and abroad yearly in Pentecost. Almost all stations were completely destroyed in 1962 under the Soviet rule. After regaining the independence the reconstruction was started. Last chapels were rebuilt in 2002. Today the entire complex is reconstructed and is proclaimed an architectural monument of national significance.

== Gallery ==
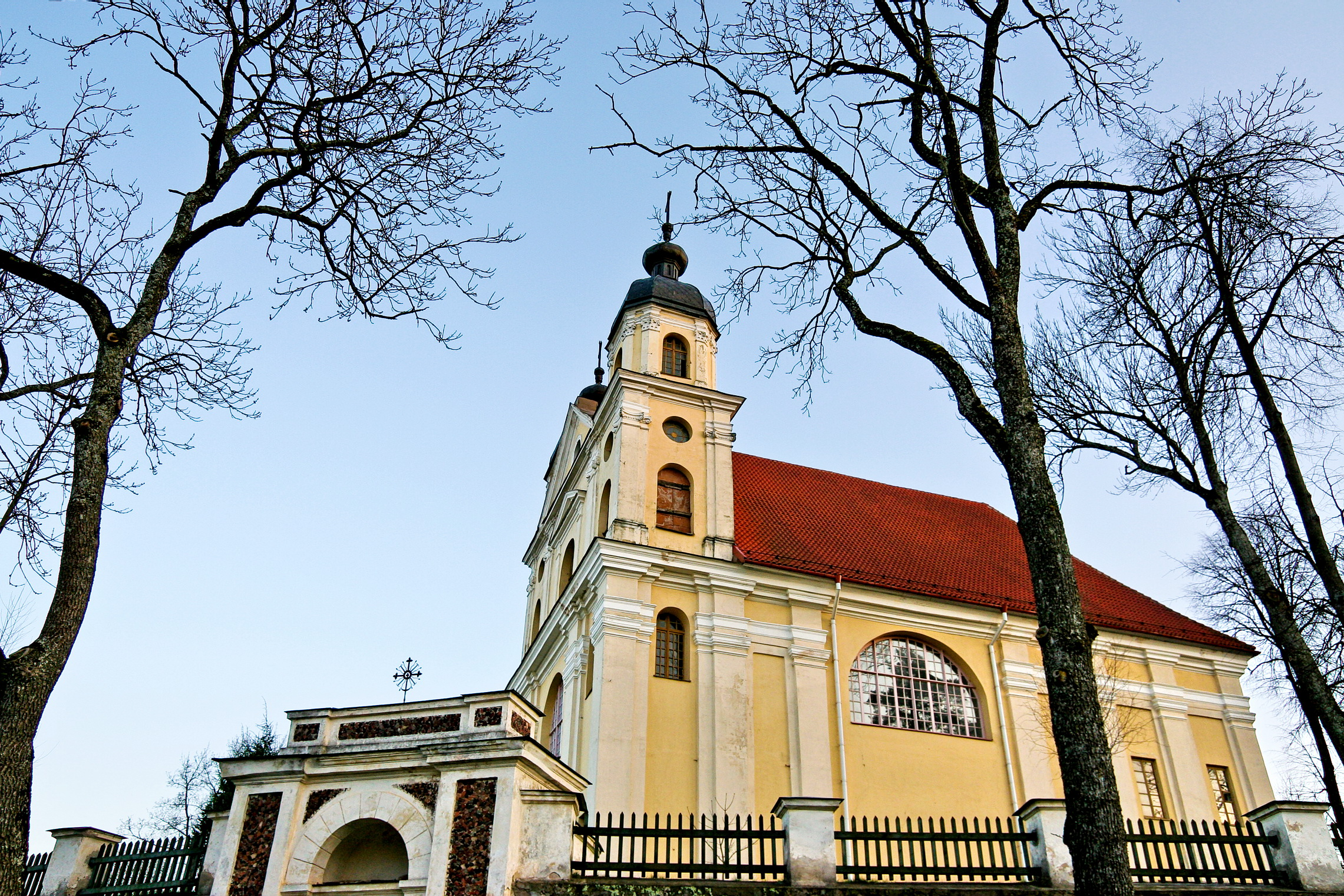
Trinity church and a monastery

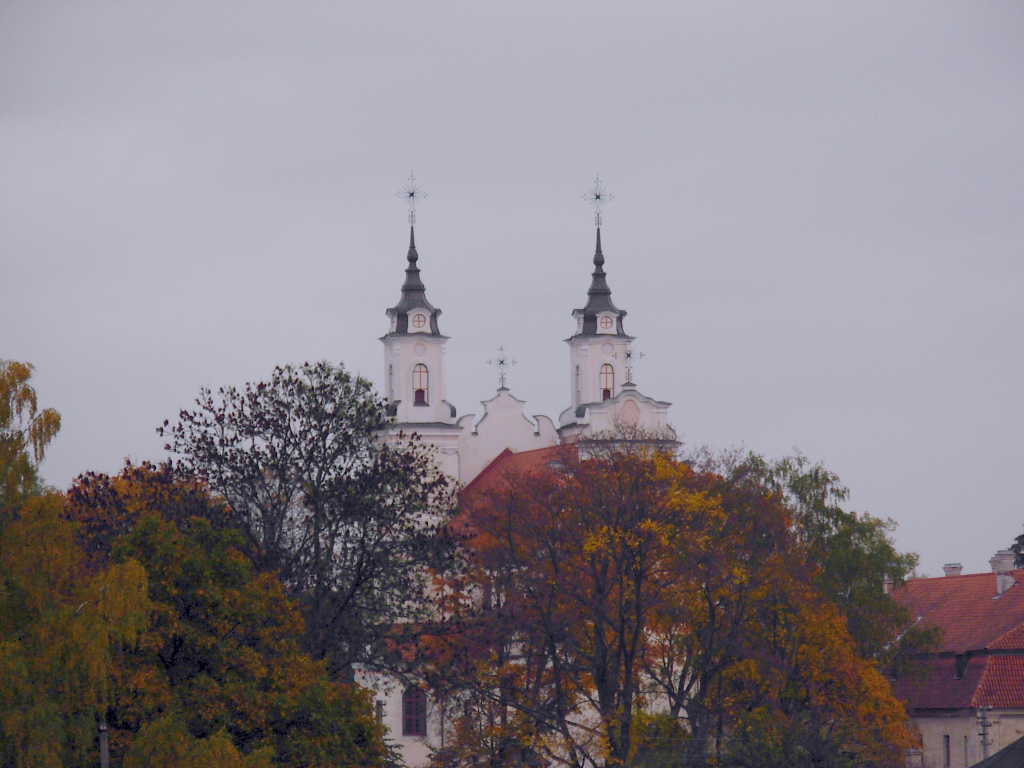
The Calavary Church

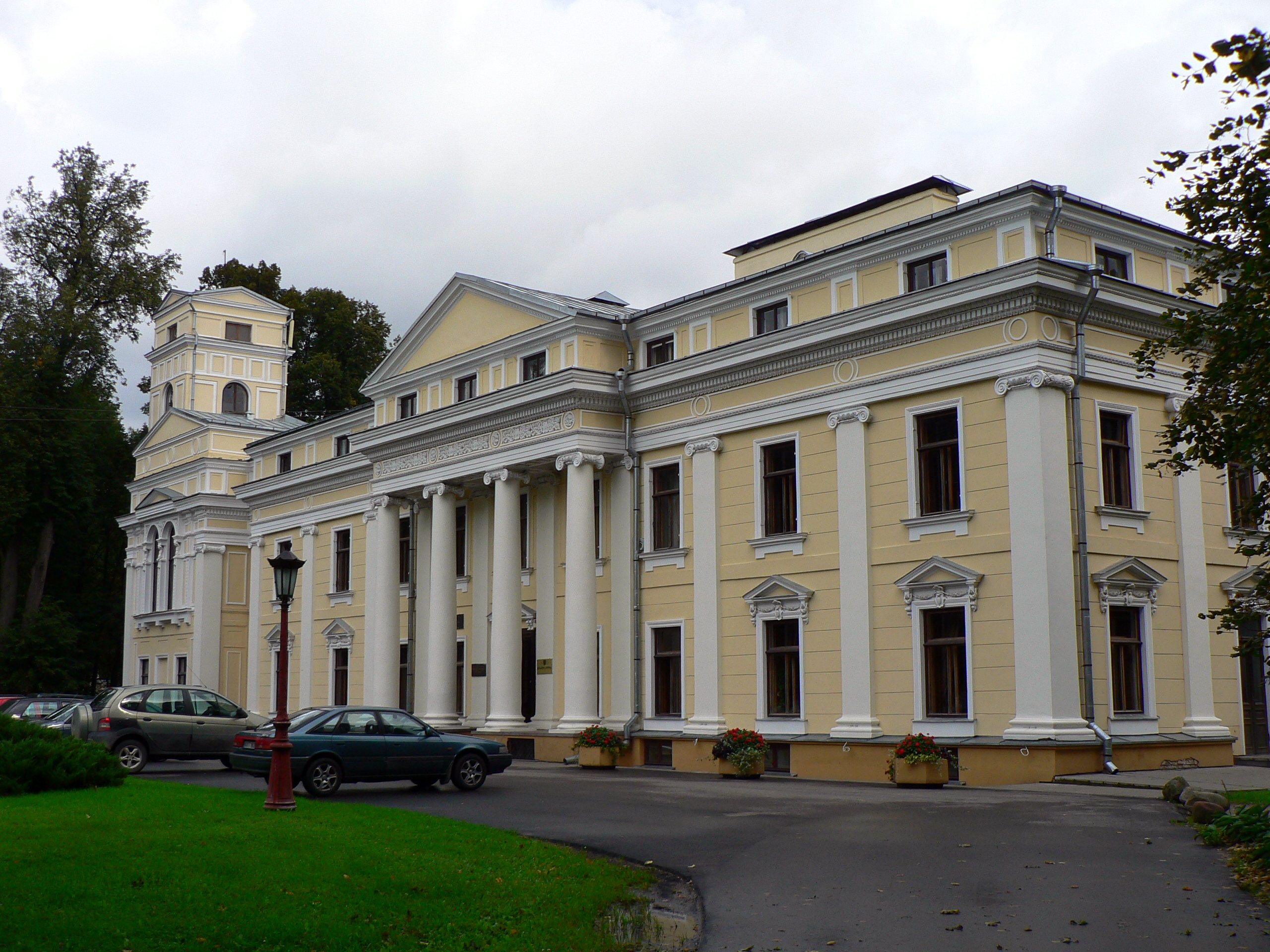
Verkiai Palace

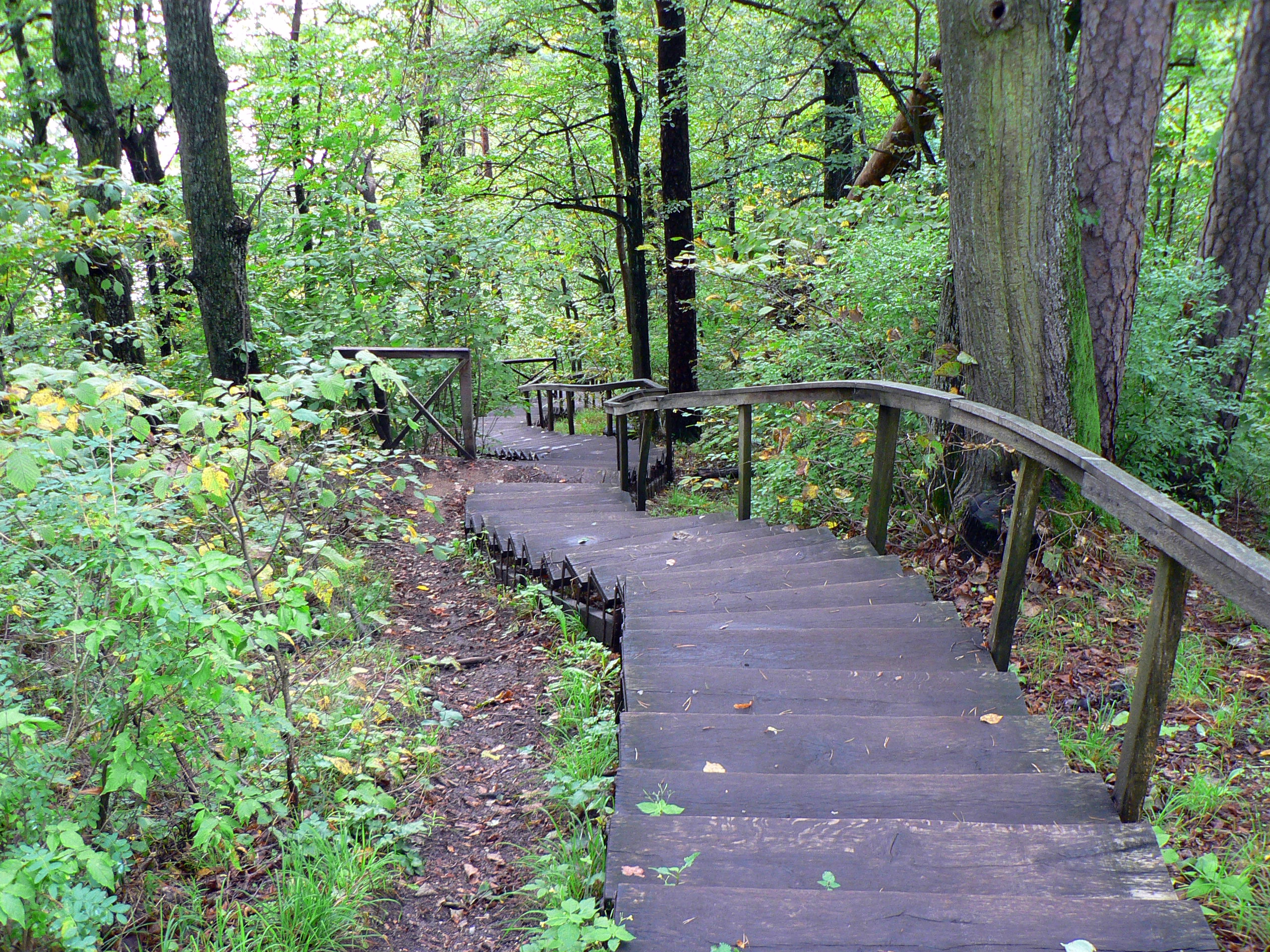
Footpath downhill of the Verkiai Palace park
