= Massalski family =

Polish and Russian princely family

Coat of Arms of the Massalski family

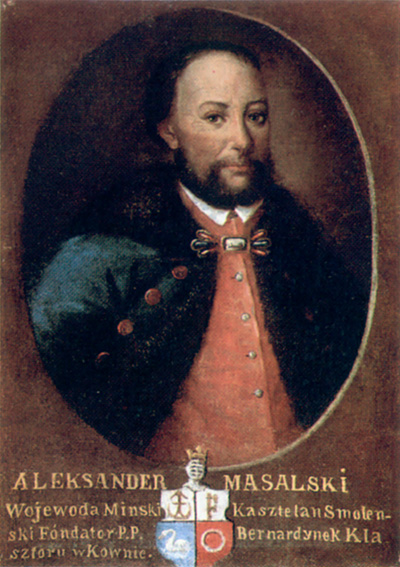
Aleksander Masalski (1593-1643), voivode of Mińsk

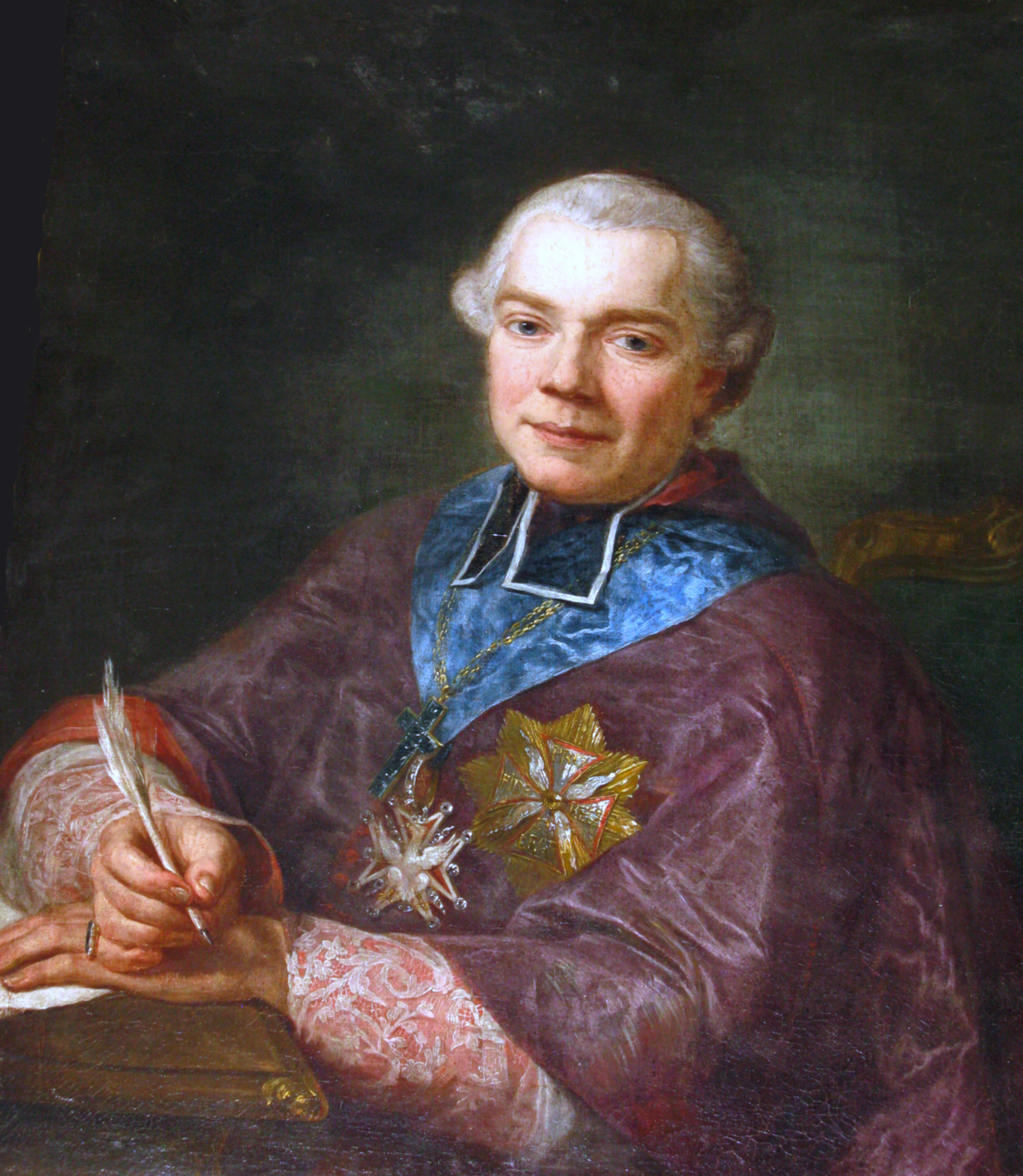
Ignacy Jakub Massalski, Bishop of Wilno

The House of Massalski (Plural: Massalscy; Lithuanian: Masalskiai, feminine form: Massalska), sometimes Masalski, Massalsky or Mosalsky, is a Polish-Lithuanian, Russian princely family of Ruthenian origin from the Principality of Chernigov and based on the city of Mosalsk.

== History ==
The family claims to be descended from the Rurik dynasty. Their princely title was recognized in 1775. Living family members are members in the Confederation of the Polish Nobility.

== Notable members ==
- Aleksander Masalski (1593-1643), voivode of Minsk Voivodeship
- Andrzej Massalski (died 1651), voivode of Minsk Voivodeship
- Michał Józef Massalski, Great Hetman of Lithuania
- Ignacy Jakub Massalski, Bishop of Wilno
- Józef Adrian Massalski (1726-1765), marszałek of the Sejm
- Helena Apolonia Massalska (1763-1815), diarist
- Edward Tomasz Massalski (1799-1879), writer and publicist
- Józef Massalski (1800-1845), poet

== Palaces ==
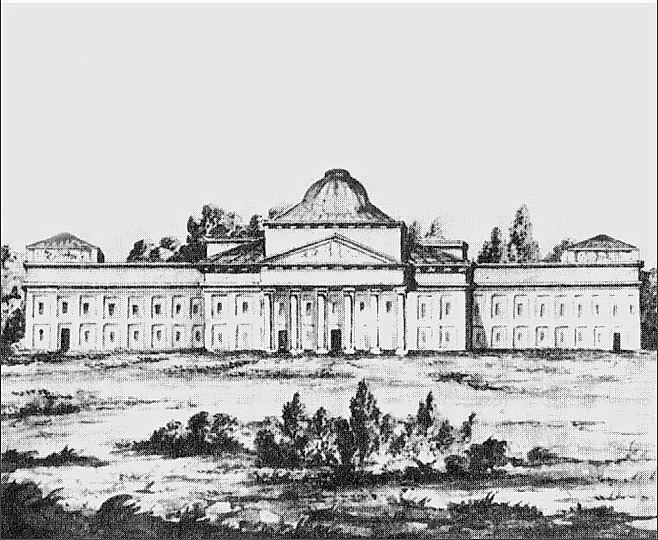
Verkiai Palace, as commissioned by Ignacy Jakub Massalski
