= Helena Apolonia Massalska =

Polish aristocrat and diarist (1763–1815)

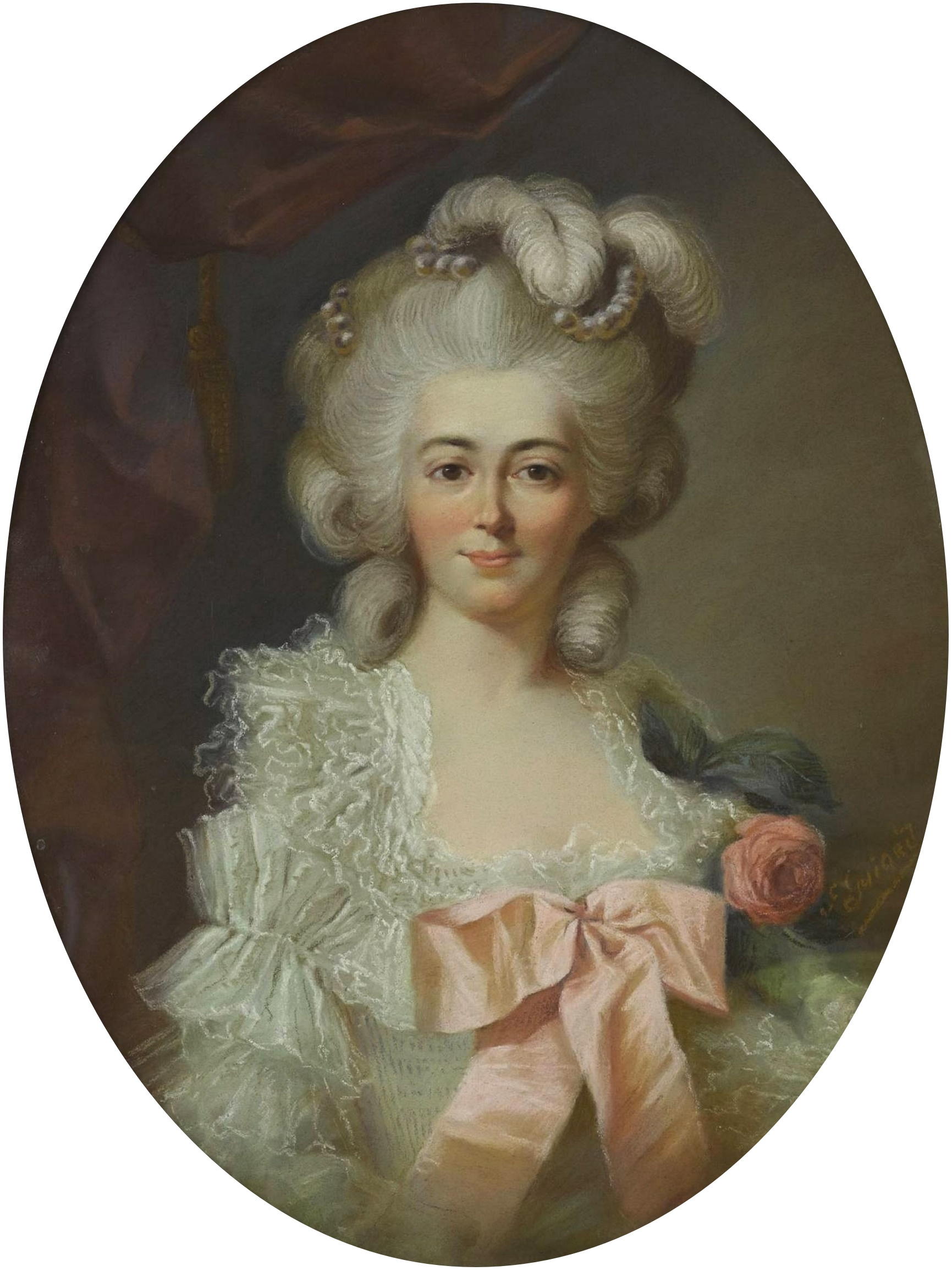
Portrait by Adélaïde Labille-Guiard, 1770–1792

Princess Helena Apolonia Massalska (1763–1815) was a Polish aristocrat and diarist.

== Life ==
She was born as an only child of Prince Jozef Adrian Massalski (1700–1768) and his wife Princess Antonina Radziwill (1730–1764).

In 1779, she married Prince Charles-Joseph Antoine de Ligne (1759–1792), and in 1794, Count Vincent Potocki (1749–1825). She had one daughter from her first marriage, Princess Sidonie de Ligne, who married Count Francis Potocki (1788–1853), who was her stepfather's son from his first marriage to Anna Mycielska (1762-1829).

== Legacy ==
She is known for her diary and her correspondence, which have been preserved and are regarded as an important source of contemporary life in Poland. She even recounts an interesting tale of the French cartomancer Etteilla, whom her father in law met, summoning a demon for a client.
