= Ignacy Jakub Massalski =

Polish–Lithuanian nobleman (1726–1794)

Ignacy Massalski
- Prince Bishop of Vilnius
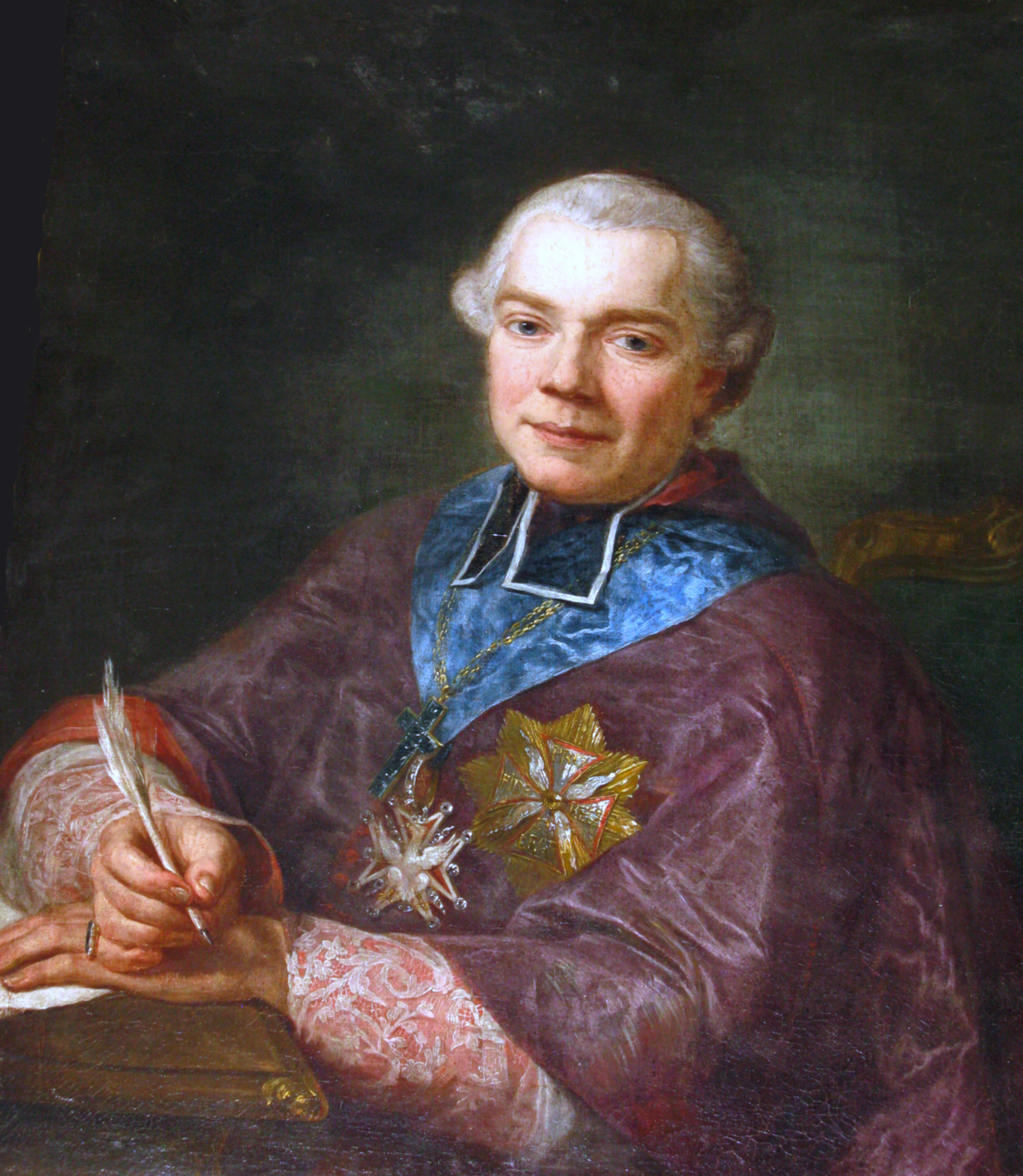

- Coat of arms: Masalski
- Born: 30 July 1726; Olekszczyce, Grand Duchy of Lithuania, Polish–Lithuanian Commonwealth
- Died: 28 June 1794 (aged 67); Warsaw, Crown of the Kingdom of Poland, Polish–Lithuanian Commonwealth
- Family: Massalski
- Father: Michał Józef Massalski
- Mother: Franciszka Ogińska

Prince Ignacy Massalski (Lithuanian: Ignotas Jokūbas Masalskis; 1726–1794) was a Polish–Lithuanian nobleman (szlachcic).

== Life ==
Ignacy became a Catholic priest and was named Bishop of Vilnius by Pope Clement XIII on 29 March 1762. Massalski sought to ensure that priests working in Lithuanian rural parishes would use the Lithuanian language. He was one of the initiators of the Commission for National Education. During his time on the commission, Massalski set up 300 parish schools.

In 1776 he was removed from the Commission for embezzlement of public funds. He was succeeded as head of the commission by Michał Jerzy Poniatowski.

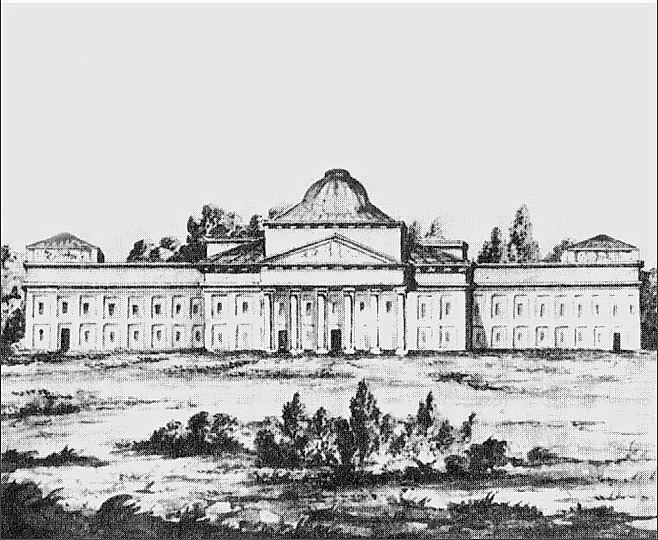
Verkiai Palace, as commissioned by Masalski

He was a supporter of the Targowica Confederation and an opponent of the Kościuszko Uprising. As bishop, Massalski was opposed to the kidnapping and forcible conversion of Jewish children. He published a pastoral letter in 1783 condemning such practices.

Massalski commissioned the reconstruction of the Vilnius Cathedral by Laurynas Gucevičius, which brought it to its present appearance. He became the owner of the Verkiai Palace in 1780 and organized its major reconstruction in the Neoclassical style, also by Gucevičius.

Accused of treason, he was hanged in Warsaw on 28 June 1794 by an angry mob in the aftermath of the Warsaw Uprising.
