= Green Lakes (Lithuania) =

Group of lakes near Vilnius, Lithuania

Žalieji lakes
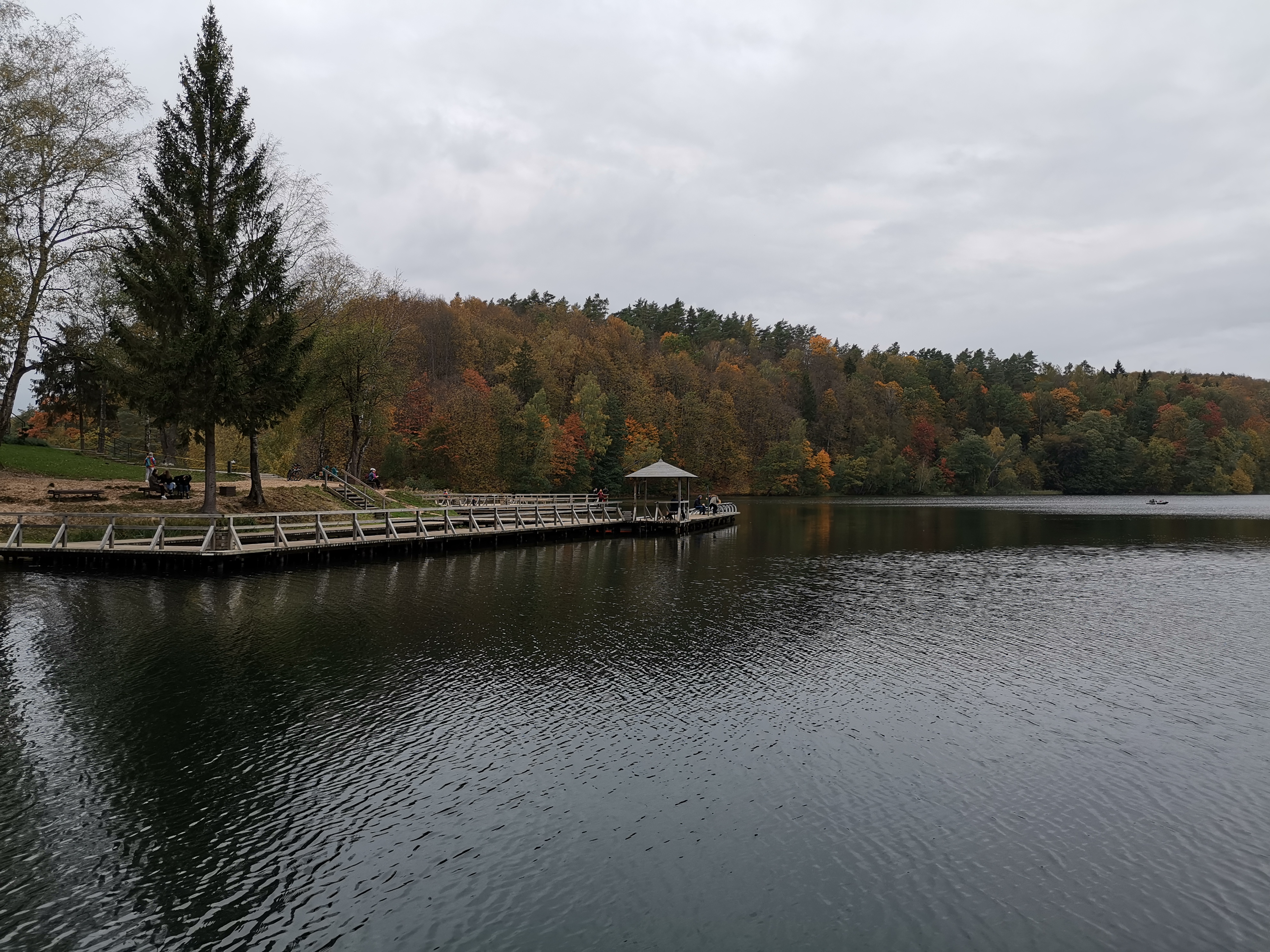
- The Beach of Lake Balsys in Autumn

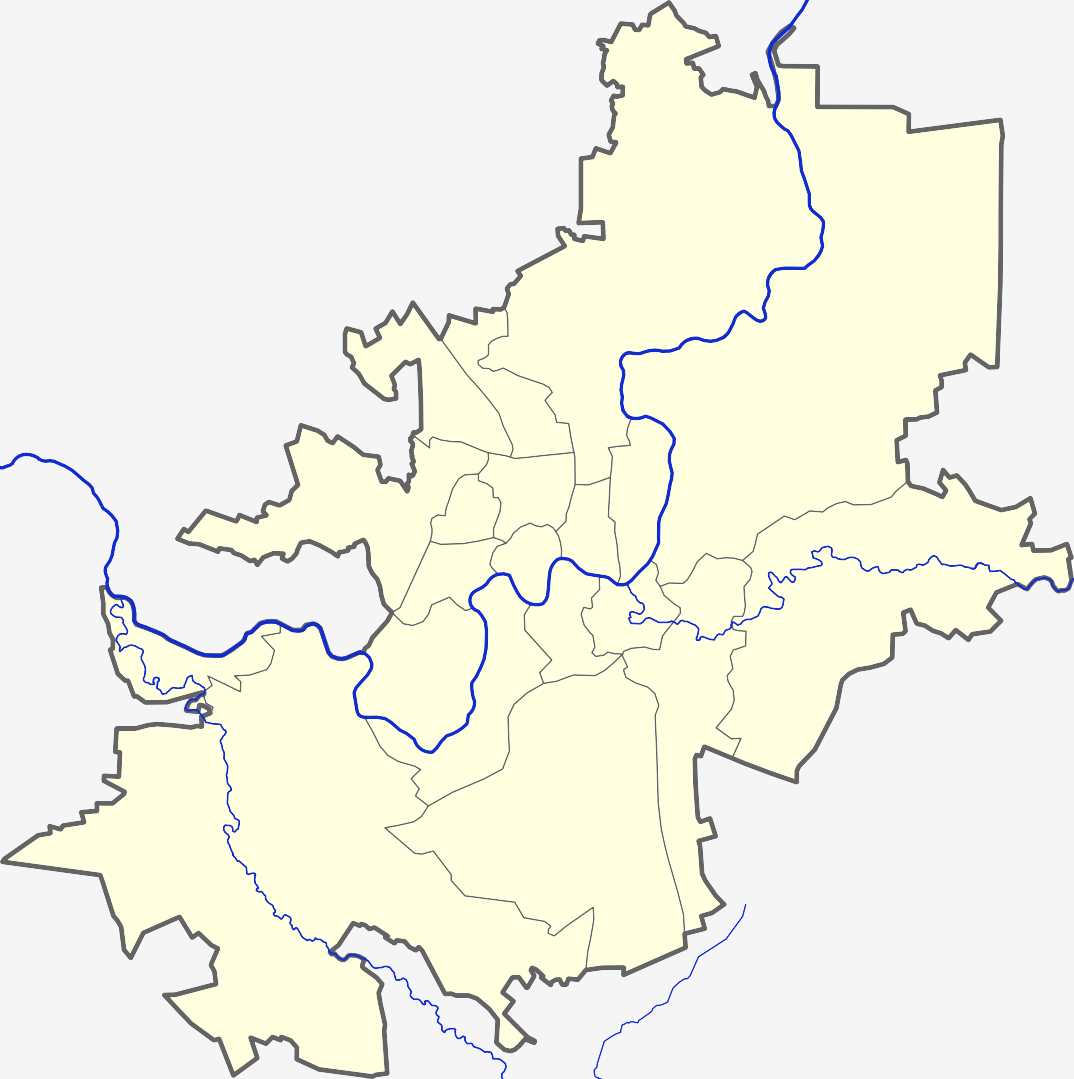
- Location within Vilnius
- Location: Vilnius county
- Coordinates: 54°47′43″N 25°19′6″E
- Basin countries: Lithuania
- Max. depth: 47 m (154 ft)
- Settlements: Vilnius

Green Lakes (Lithuanian: Žalieji ežerai) are six lakes located in northeastern part of Vilnius, Lithuania. They are a part of Verkiai Regional Park.

The six lakes are named:

- Balsys Lake
- Gulbinas Lake
- Mažasis (Little) Gulbinas Lake
- Akis Lake
- Raistelis Lake
- Baraukos Akis Lake

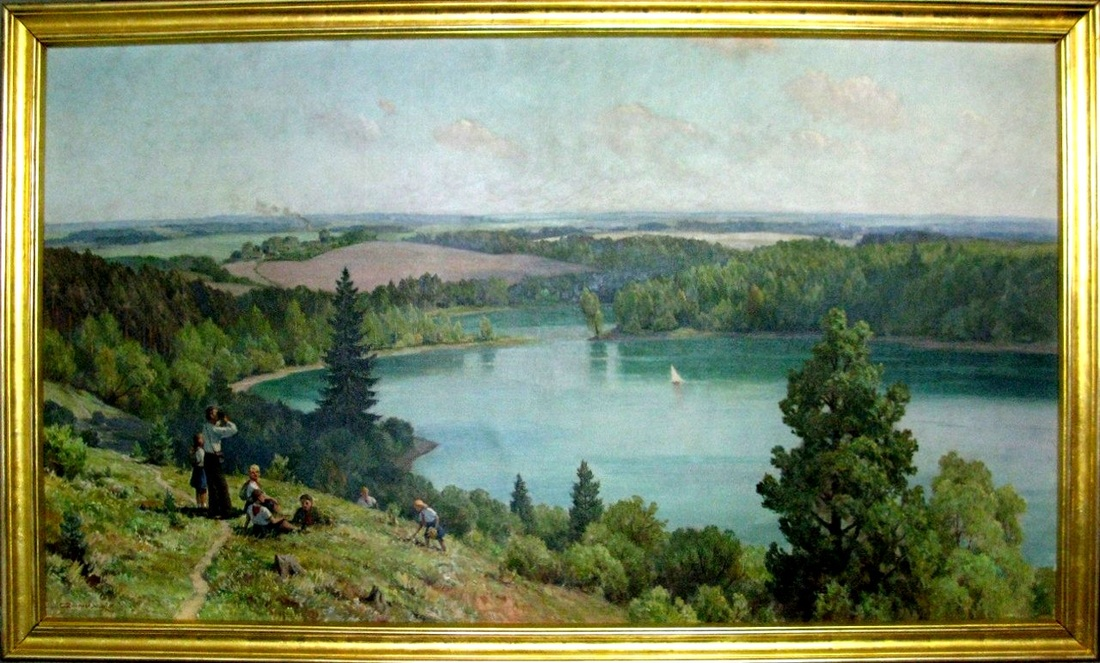
Чеслав Знамеровский, «Зелёные озёра», 250 х 145 см, 1955
