= Verkiai Palace =

- Verkių rūmai (Lithuanian)
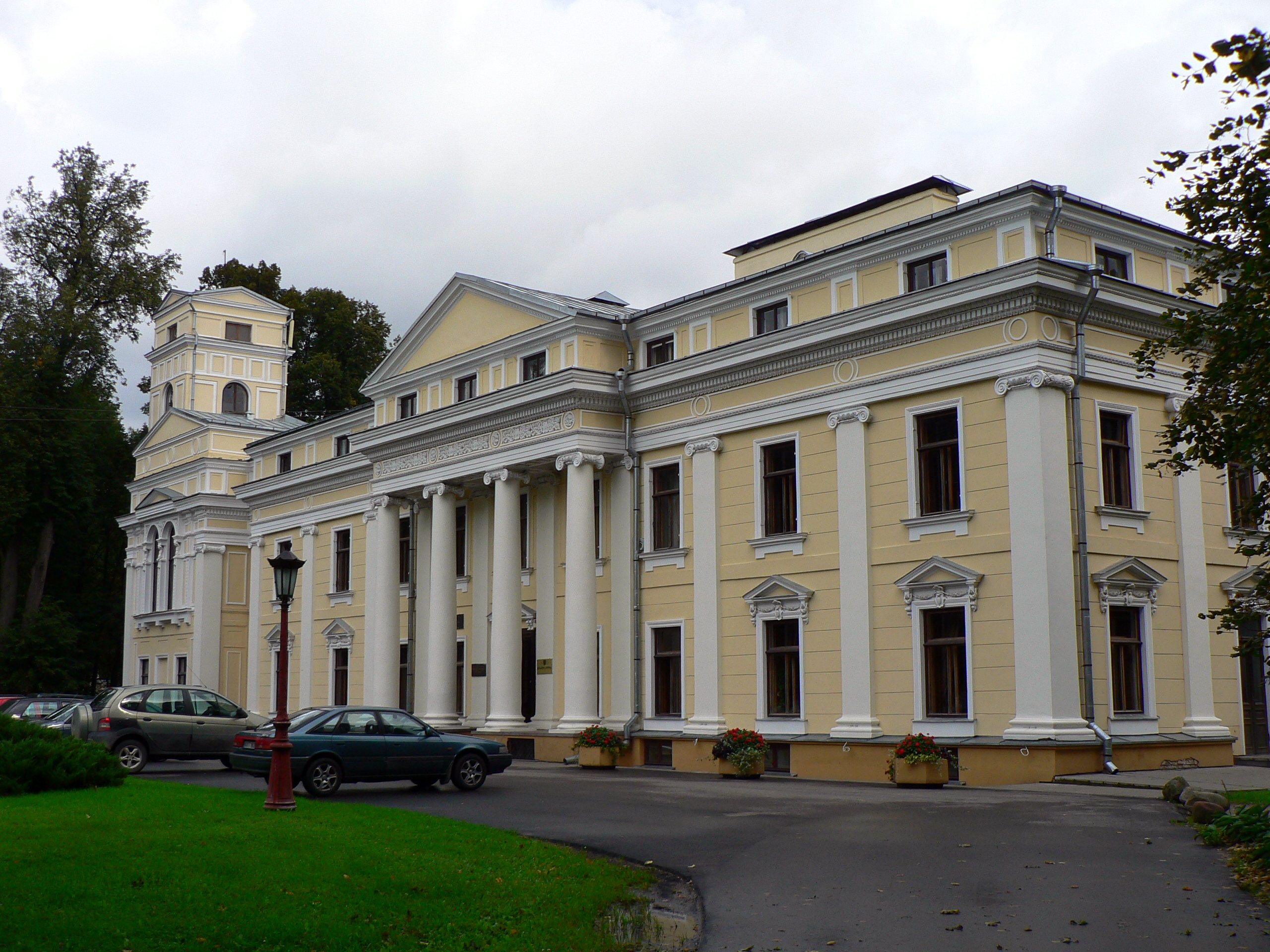
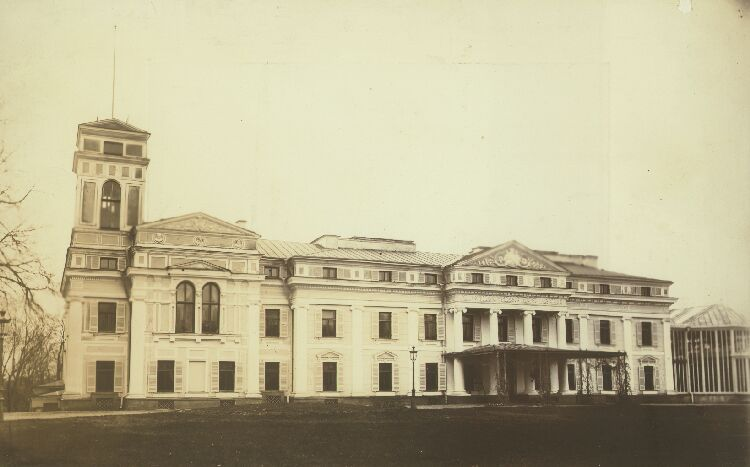
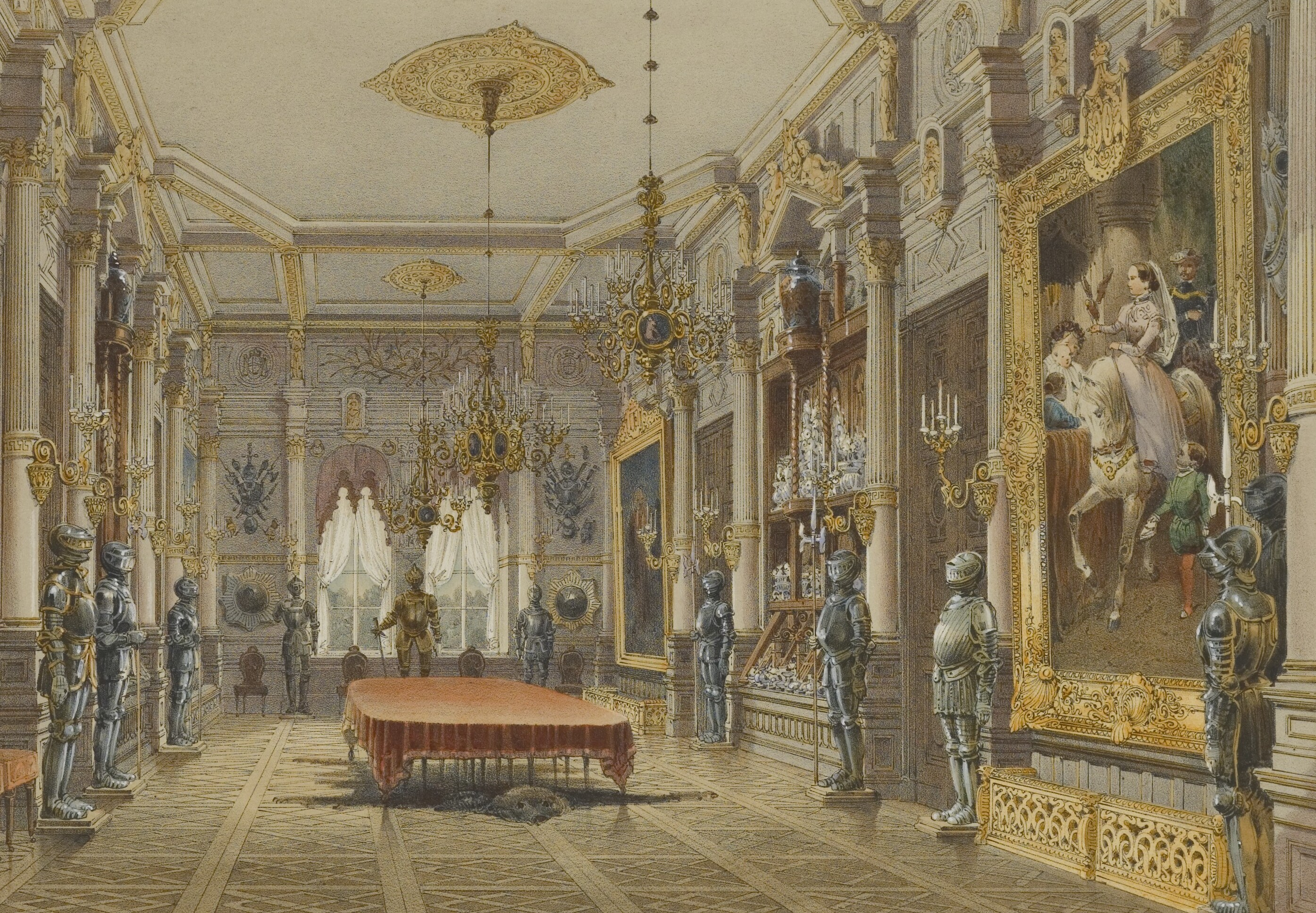
- Current façade; Façade of 1904; Knights' Hall
Map location and basic information
Interactive map of the Verkiai Palace area
General information
| Architectural style | Neoclassicism |
| Location | Verkiai, Vilnius, Lithuania |
| Coordinates | 54.748056°N 25.292778°E |
| Construction started | 14th century |
| Owner | Government of Lithuania |
Website
www.verkiai.lt/en

Verkiai Palace (Lithuanian: Verkių rūmai) is an 18th-century neoclassical mansion in Verkiai, Vilnius, Lithuania.

== History ==
Until the end of the 14th century this place was a property of the Grand Dukes of Lithuania. There was a wooden manor even in the 13th century. In 1387 Lithuanian Grand Duke and King of Poland Jogaila, on occasion of accepting Christianity, donated this place to Vilnius' Episcopate. Verkiai served as the permanent summer residence of Vilnius bishops until the end of the 18th century.

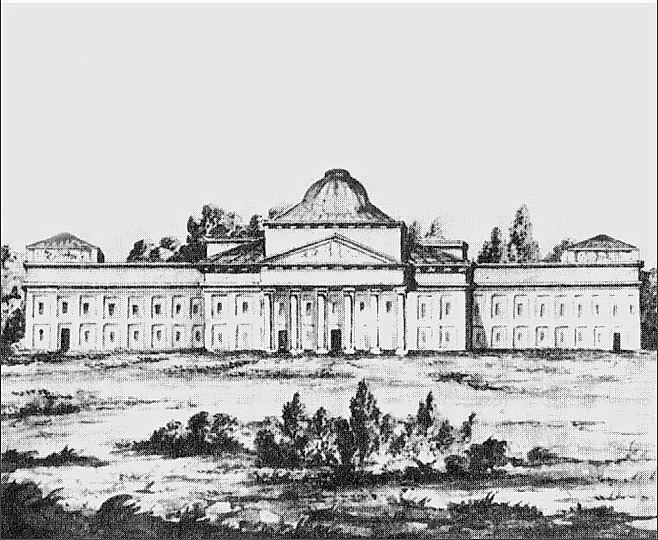
Central palace drawn before its demolition

Verkiai Palace became widely known after bishop Ignacy Jakub Massalski took over it in 1780. He hired two famous architects, Marcin Knackfus and Laurynas Gucevičius, to rebuild the palace in the Neoclassical style. The general plan and maintenance buildings were designed by Marcin Knackfus. The main palace building, the stables and several other buildings were designed by Gucevičius. The building was called "the Versailles of Vilnius". The palace had a little theatre, large library, and a small gun museum and was surrounded by a park.

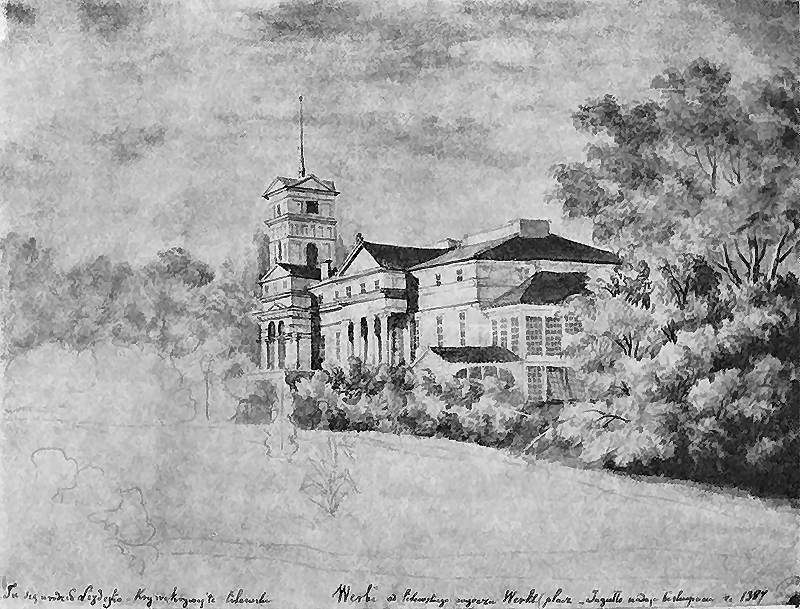
Verkiai Palace: an 1877 drawing by Napoleon Orda

The palace was severely damaged during Napoleon's invasion of Russia. Eventually, the central building of the palace was pulled down on the order of a new owner, prince Ludwig Wittgenstein, who bought Verkiai in 1839. He also ordered restructuring the other buildings and the east wing office house assumed the role of the palace since the 1840s. It is attested that the first known photographs in present-day Lithuania were taken there in 1839, when Karol Podczaszyński made a daguerreotype of the palace which was intended to be rebuilt. The images have not survived. In 1918, during the existence of the short-lived Kingdom of Lithuania, the palace was considered for being an official residence to the newly King-elect of Lithuania, Wilhelm Karl, Duke of Urach (Mindaugas II).

After World War II, the remaining palace buildings were used as educational institutions and an art museum. Since 1960 the ensemble belongs to the Lithuanian Institute of Botany now part of the Nature Research Center. Verkiai Palace complex is an important cultural and historical landmark in Verkiai Regional Park.
