= Kashirskoye, Voronezh Oblast =

Rural locality in Voronezh Oblast, Russia

Coordinates: 51°24′42″N 39°35′37″E

Kashirskoye (Russian: Каширское) is a rural locality (a selo) and the administrative center of Kashirsky District of Voronezh Oblast, Russia. Population: 4,166 (2021 census); 4,342 (2010 census); 4,628 (2002 census); 4,795 (1989 Soviet census).
