= Kashirsky District, Voronezh Oblast =

Kashirsky District Каширский район (Russian)
- District
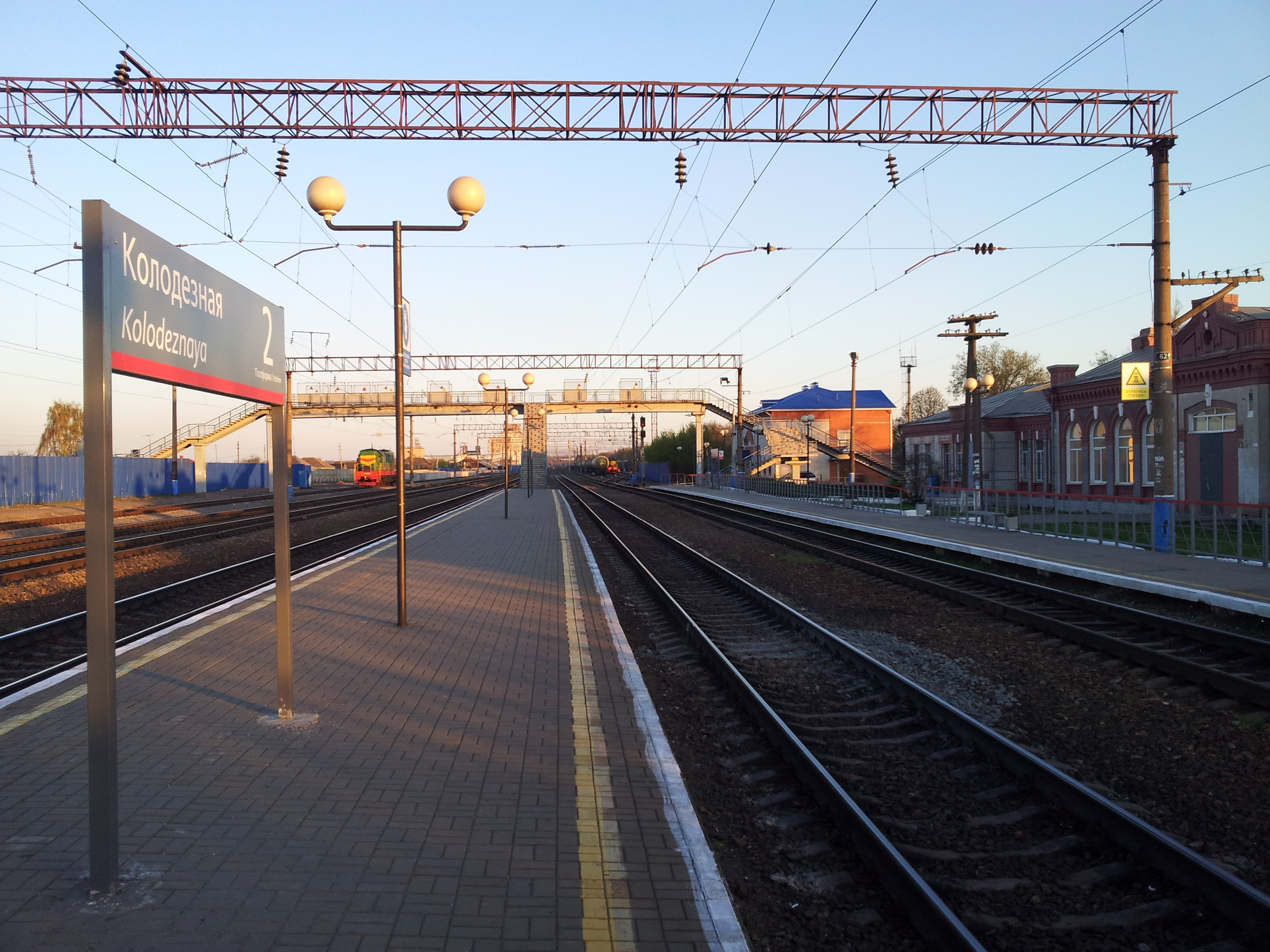
- Kolodeznaya Station, Kashirsky District

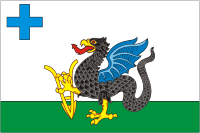
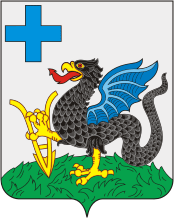
- Flag Coat of arms
- Location of Kashirsky District in Voronezh Oblast
- Coordinates: 51°25′42″N 39°37′13″E
- Country: Russia
- Federal subject: Voronezh Oblast
- Established: 1977
- Administrative center: Kashirskoye

Area
  - Total: 1,060 km^{2} (410 sq mi)

Population (2010 Census)
  - Total: 25,268
  - Density: 23.8/km^{2} (61.7/sq mi)
  - Urban: 0%
  - Rural: 100%

Administrative structure
  - Administrative divisions: 14 Rural settlements
  - Inhabited localities: 30 rural localities

Municipal structure
  - Municipally incorporated as: Kashirsky Municipal District
  - Municipal divisions: 0 urban settlements, 14 rural settlements
- Time zone: UTC+3 (MSK)
- OKTMO ID: 20620000
- Website: http://kashir-rn.ru/

Kashirsky District (Russian: Каши́рский райо́н) is an administrative and municipal district (raion), one of the thirty-two in Voronezh Oblast, Russia. It is located in the northwestern central part of the oblast. The area of the district is 106019,9 hectares (409,3 sq mi), as of 2016. Its administrative center is the rural locality (a selo) of Kashirskoye. Population: 23,122 (2021 census); 25,268 (2010 census); 27,106 (2002 census); 30,414 (1989 Soviet census). The population of Kashirskoye accounts for 18.0% of the district's total population.

== See also ==
- 40 let Oktyabrya
