= Principality of Purgaz =

Mordvin principality in 13th-century Russia

Principality of Purgaz Пургасова волость (Russian) Пургазонь Русесь (Erzya)
- c. late 12th–mid-13th century
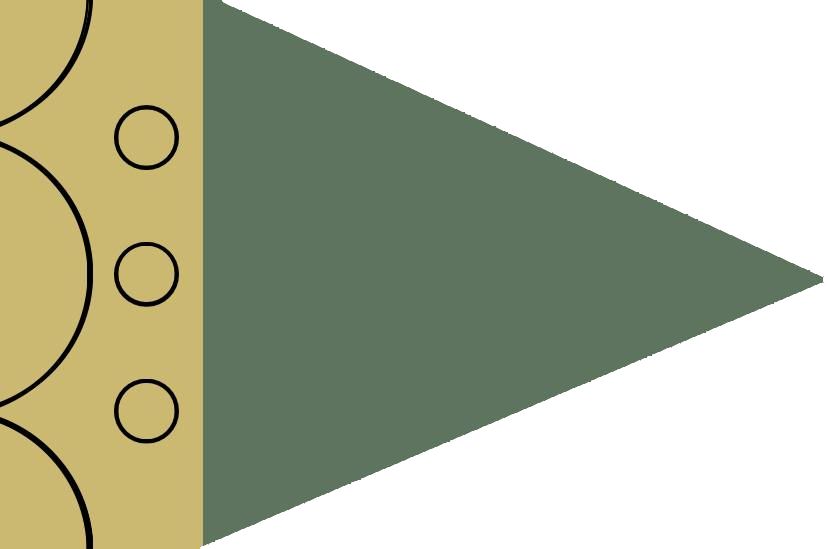
- Flag
- Ethnic groups: Mordvins, Russians
- Religion: Erzyan native religion

Government
  - Inäzor: Purgaz
- History
  - Established: c. late 12th–mid-13th century
Succeeded by
Golden Horde
- Today part of: Russia; Mordovia; Nizhny Novgorod Oblast; Ryazan Oblast

The Principality of Purgaz (Russian: Пургасова волость, romanized: Purgasova volost; Erzya: Пургазонь Русесь, romanized: Purgazoń Ruseś), also referred to as the Purgas Volost, was a "Mordvin" principality located between the Oka and Sura rivers. The principality is an important part of Mordvin history and is notable for marking the first time the Erzyas and Mokshas united under a single polity.

== Background ==
The Mordvin peoples, comprising the Erzya and Moksha ethnic groups, began to unify at the start of the 2nd millennium as a result of upheavals in the social structure of Mordvin tribes and the establishment of early class relations. Further assisting the political unification of the Mordvins was a series of military campaigns by the Khazars and Kievan Rus', which brought the Mordvin tribes together in a successful effort to defeat foreign militaries. According to the Primary Chronicle, a March 1103 invasion of the Mordvins by the Kievan Rus' ended in a Mordvin victory.

== History ==
Attempts to conquer the Mordvins escalated in 1184, with a violent process of colonisation by the principality of Vladimir-Suzdal on the Mordvins. As a result of this colonisation, the city of Nizhny Novgorod was established. Per the Laurentian Codex, Mordvins were taken as slaves. Further campaigns by Vladimir-Suzdal resulted in further destruction of Mordvin lands, and their settlement by Slavs.

Erzya prince Purgaz entered the war against Vladimir-Suzdal in 1229, forging an alliance with Volga Bulgaria. The same year, the war between Purgaz and Vladimir-Suzdal had also expanded into a civil war among the Mordvins; Purgaz, supported by Volga Bulgaria, fought against Puresh, a Moksha ruler who had defected to the side of Vladimir-Suzdal. Puresh's son Atämaz initially won several victories, and Purgaz barely escaped amidst widespread massacres of the Erzya population. Despite these victories, however, Vladimir-Suzdal's campaign ended in 1232, with Purgaz's principality surviving.

By the mid-13th century, the Principality of Purgaz was absorbed into the Golden Horde. It became the Mukhsha Ulus.

== Organisation ==
Much information on the Principality of Purgaz remains unknown, including its capital and exact borders. Several possible sites for a capital have been proposed, including Arzamas, near Kadom, or Sarov.

In terms of the principality's political organisation, archaeologist Gennady Belorybkin has argued that Purgaz was a subject of the Burtas tribe, and the principality itself became subordinated to Volga Bulgaria. Other scholars, such as R. G. Mukhamedova, have also supported the hypothesis that Purgaz was part of the Burtas.

Soviet historian Mikhail Pokrovsky characterised the Principality of Purgaz as an example of class conflict rather than simply a Mordvin-Russian conflict, noting the presence of Russian peasants on the side of Purgaz against the government of Vladimir-Suzdal and the popularity of Purgaz's cause among the peasantry.
