= Narchat =

13th-century Mokshas queen

- Khanazorava
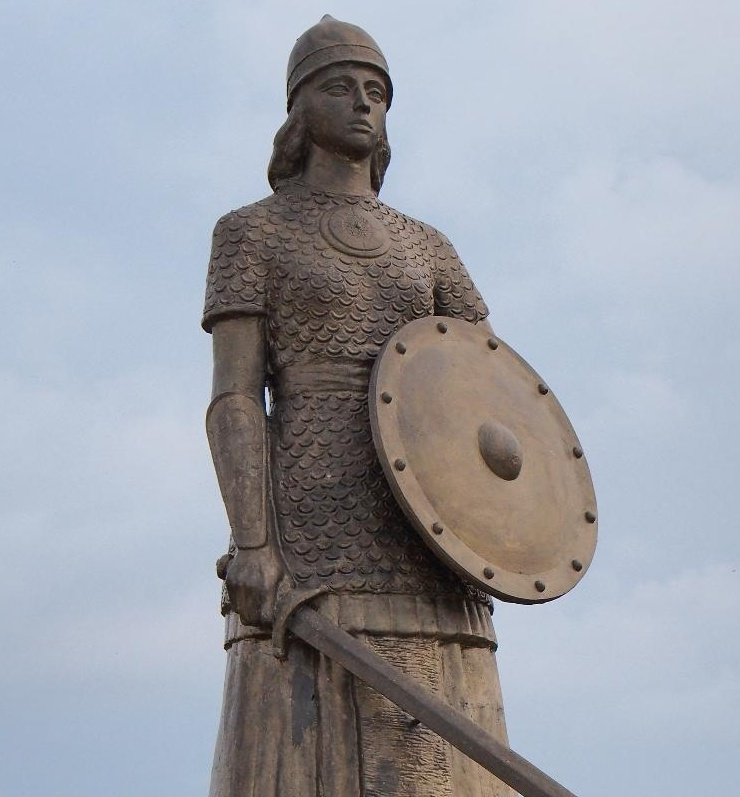
- Monument to Queen Narchat in Narovchat, Penza region, Russia

Princess regent of Mukhsha Ulus
- Regency: 1237–1241
- Monarch: Kanazor (King) Puresh (under the reign of the Mongols)

Khanazorava (Queen) of Mukhsha Ulus
- Reign: 1241–1242
- Predecessor: Puresh
- Died: 1242; Moksha river
- Father: Puresh

Narchat, Narchatka, Naricha (Moksha: Нарчат, Нарчатка, Нарича, romanized: Narchat, Narchatka, Naricha) was a Moksha Queen, ruler of Mukhsha Ulus. She was daughter and successor of king Puresh and sister of Atämaz.

== Historical personality ==
Russian professor from Penza State Pedagogical University Vitaliy Lebedev wrote:

All legends of Narchat mention that there was a battle of local population with Tatar-Mongols. The battle took place in winter time <...> Almost in all legends she is known as Mordvin Queen and in two as Burtass

— Vitaliy Lebedev, Лебедев В. И. Загадочный город Мохши

Doctor of Sciences Dmitriy Madurov of Chuvash state Institute of Humanities writes:

She might be only Moksha. First she was daughter of king Puresh, second war was waged in Mokshaland, third other ethnic groups are known they might have had a female as the head of state but not the army

Indeed, it is known the Burtas had been ruled by elders.

=== Narchat in coinage ===
Ethnographer Vladimir Aunovsky wrote that he encountered coins with Narchatka portrait in traditional Moksha woman's headdress and they say: "This is our queen". These coins are called mordovkas in slang, or silver coins type A as they are described by Bogdan Zaikovsky with inscription in Moksha language in Greek Uncial script (Moksha: μοΛͷ ΑΗςͷ οκΑΗ ΠεΛκͷ 'goes only for half Oka (gold coin name)') and might be dated as 4-8th century AD. Triangle coins, pre-Mongolian silver Valfs, 22x23 mm size, with a depiction of a woman in a headdress» are described by Vyacheslav Zavaryukhin as he specifies they should be referred to as Mukhsha coinage according to the Christian Frähn's list.

== Legend ==
Puresh became a vassal of Batu Khan and joined Mongol army in the European campaign. Narchat remained to rule when her father Puresh and brother Atämaz left with the Mongols. On the eve of the Battle of Legnica, Puresh entered into negotiations with the High Duke of Poland, Henry II the Pious. The Mongols killed the unfaithful vassal Puresh and his son. Queen Narchat led the uprising against Mongols. Defeated in 1242, she threw herself into the water with her horse.

== Literature ==
- Masztorava, Erza és moksa népköltészeti anyag feldolgozásával írta Alekszandr Markovics Saronov, Budapest, 2010
- Лебедев В. И. Нарчатка / Пензенская энциклопедия. М.: Научное издательство «Большая Российская энциклопедия», 2001, с. 376
- Алихова А. Е., М. Ф. Жиганов, П. Д. Степанов. Из древней и средневековой истории мордовского народа. Саранск, 1959.
- Пудалов Б. М., Начальный период истории древнейших городов Среднего Поволжья. (XII ѕ первая треть XIII в.) Нижний Новгород, 2003
- Фомин В. В., Пургасова Русь. Институт Российской истории РАН, 2007.
- Устно-поэтическое творчество мордовского народа в 12 томах, Саранск, 1963-2003
- Мордовская мифология/ Энциклопедия. Саранск, 2013

== Sources ==
- Shtereshis, Michael (2013), Tamerlane and the Jews, London and New York: Routledge, ISBN 9781136873669
- Minorsky, Vladimir; al-ʿĀlam, Ḥudūd (1952), Ḥudūd al-ʿĀlam. The regions of the world: a Persian geography, 372 A.H./982 A.D para 52. The Alān Capital *Magas and the Mongol Campaign, Cambridge University Press, JSTOR 608675
- Inzhevatov, I.K.; Pomerantseva, E.V., eds. (1983) [First published 1963]. "UPTMN". Oral Poetry Of Mordvin people, 1963–2003. Vol. 10. Mordovian Research Institute for Language, Literature, and Economy. p. 255.
- Aunovsky, V (1869), Ethnograpical Essay Of Mordva-Moksha. Simbirsk Governorate Memorial Book for 1869, Simbirsk, pp. 85–108
- Zaikovsky, Bogdan (1929). "Mordovkas Problem". Nizhne-Volzhskaya Oblast Ethnological Scientific Society Review (36–2). Saratov: 30–32.
- Mayorov, Aleksandr (2021). "Woman, Diplomacy and War. Russian Princes In Negotiations With Batu Before Mongol Invasion". Шаги/Steps. 7 (3). Steps Journal: 124–199.
- Lebedev, Vitaly (1990), Legends of Burtas Tsarina Narchatka. Problems of Volga-Don Ethnic History in Middle Ages and Burtas Problem (in Russian), Penza
- Kryukov, N. (17 June 2008). "Sernya the Jewelers' City". Nasha Penza (in Russian). No. 30.
