= Moksha names =

Names among people of Moksha language and culture

Moksha names are the personal names among people of Moksha language and culture; they generally consist of a given name, a patronymic, and a family name.

== History ==
During the Russian period, surnames with Russian suffixes such as "-ov", "-yev","-(k)in", "-(o)vich" became common, first among Tambov, Tula, Penza and Siberian Mokshas. It is not clear when stable family surnames became widely used. Though elite families often had stable family names, many of the "last names" used by Mokshas into the 19th century were either patronymics or nicknames. It is also possible that family names were simply not recorded because Russian administrative practice preferred patronymics, and did not require surnames.

In the 19th century, patronymic surnames became common but still few family names still reflected archaic clan names.

For personal names, from the first century CE until the nineteenth century CE, pagan names from the past were partially replaced by names from Judaic scriptures and tradition. During the Russian Colonisation names of Jewish origin still were popular since they now became Biblical.

Family names may be patronymic in origin or else based on occupation, location, or personal characteristic. These origins are often indicated by roots or suffixes. Traditionally a woman used a feminine version of her father's family name, replacing it with a feminine version of her husband's name with suffix – (o/a)räsj (<Moksha: рьвясь, romanized: rvas, lit. 'the wife of') and in documents husband's family name on marriage. In modern time, a woman keeps her father's family name for life until marriage then husband's family name is used.

== Given names ==
Until the late 19th century, many Judaic Mokshas had names from the Torah and later Old and New Testaments. Names from antiquity became less popular.

Male names usually end in -a/-ä, -ai/ei, -u/-iu but sometimes archaic forms in -man, -mas, -for, -as/es/is, -ash/esh/ish are also used. Female names almost always end in -a/ä- and -u/iu, though a few end in -ai with -l, -gä or being possible.

Since ancient times, there has been a strong tradition of naming the first and second sons after the paternal and maternal grandfathers and the first and second daughters after the paternal and maternal grandmothers.

== Family names ==
Moksha family names are most commonly patronymics but may also be based on occupation, personal characteristics or clan name.

=== Russian surnames ===
People in speaking use the family name followed by the given name, so Osä Cherapon is called Cherapon Osä. In modern practice he is called Russian name Iosif Cherapkin, where Iosif is the Russian form of the formal Joseph and Cherapkin is possessive form from Moksha name Cherapa. The Russian feminine version is usually the genitive of the family name of the woman's father or husband; so, for example, Mr. Shukshin and Mrs. Shukshina.

== See also ==
- Onomastics
- Mokshas

== Sources ==
- Paasonen, Heikki (1996). Mordwinisches Wörterbuch Helsinki, Suomalais-ugrilainen seura, 1990–1996 [Heikki Paasonen; Kaino Heikkilä; Hans-Hermann Bartens; A P Feoktistov; G I Ermushkin; Martti Kahla. H. Paasonens Mordwinisches Wörterbuch] (in German).
- Inzhevatov, Ivan; Nikonov, Vladimir; Tsygankin, Dmitry, eds. (1987) [First published 1969]. Toponymic Dictionary Of Mordvin Autonomous Republic. Mordovian Book Publishing.
- Mokshin, N.F. (1991). Mysteries of Mordvinic Names: Historical Onomasticon of Mordvinic people (in Russian). Cordovan Publishing. ISBN 575950634X.
- Mokshin, Nikolay (2012), "At Sources Of The Mordovian-Jewish Ethnocultural Ties", Social and Political Science (in Russian) (4): 6–8
- Lyubavsky, Matvei (2022). Historical Geography of Russia In The View of Colonisation (in Russian). Litres. ISBN 978-5044121287.
- Mukhametshin, D.G. (2008). "Tatar Epigraphic Monuments. Regional Peculiarities and Ethnocultural Varieties" (PDF). Euroasian Steppes Archaeology (in Russian) (6). Kazan: Mardzhani Institute of History. Academy of Sciences of Tatarstan.
