= Temnikov Principality =

Former country

Bekhanid Principality of Tümen Tatar: Төмəн ханлыгы, romanized: Tömän xanlığı
- 1388–1684
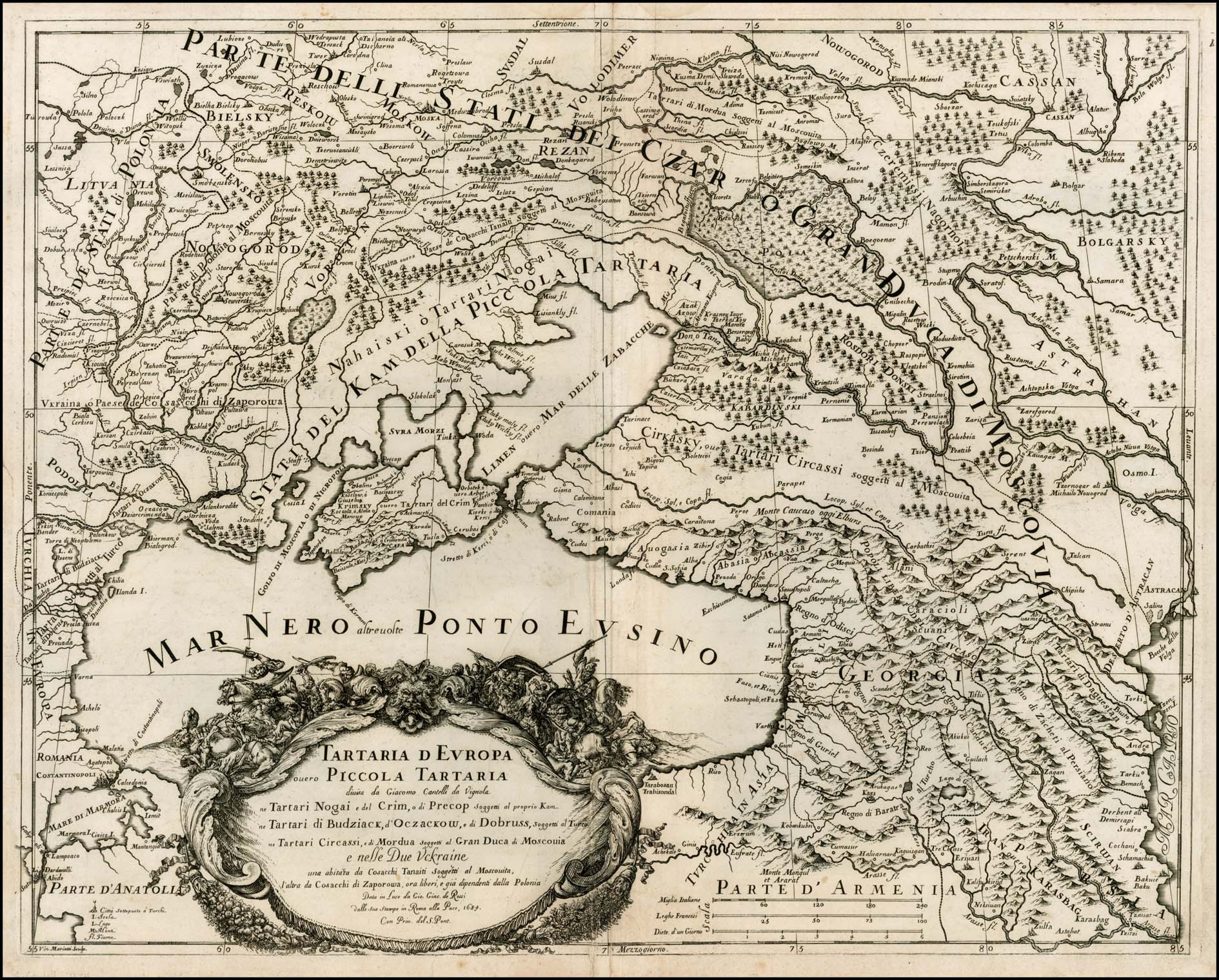
- Mordvin Tatars subject to Muscovy in 1684
- Status: Grand Duchy of Moscow protectorate since 1684
- Capital: Tümen(Tatar: Tömän kalası)
- Common languages: Turki (official), Tatar, Moksha
- Government: Monarchy
- Prince (*Gyula)
  - 1388: *Kegyes Ténes
- Historical era: Middle Ages
  - Established: 1388
  - Disestablished: 1684
Preceded by	Succeeded by
Mukhsha Ulus	Grand Duchy of Moscow; Russian Empire
- Today part of: Russia

The Temnikov Principality or Tümen Principality (Tatar: Төмән ханлыгы, romanized: Tömän xanlığı, Italian: Tartari di Mordua, lit. 'Mordvin Tatars'), was a Mishar and Moksha principality in the lands of the Principality of Ryazan. The state was closely allied with the Grand Duchy of Moscow.

== Etymology ==
Tatar: Төмән ханлыгы, romanized: Tömän xanlığı and Church Slavonic: темник means tümen commander and refers to the city founder Prince Tenish Kugushev or his immediate ancestors. Other scholars M. Safargaliev, P. Chermensky consider Temnikov second one in importance ulus centre after Mukhsha since the etymology of the placename itself points at Golden Horde tümen commander's headquarters.

== History ==
The principality was established by Prince Bekhan in 1388. The principality later expanded and comprised territories within Oka-Tsena-Sura interfluve. It was confirmed by archeological findings in the 1960s.

== Tümen Princes ==
- Kugushevs – Mishar dynasty
- Rasts – Moksha dynasty (sometimes mistakenly referred to as "Siberian" since Tümen and Tyumen were mixed Djagfar Tarikhy mentioned Rasts as Seber Princes, which means "of Moksha or Hungarian descent"

Mentioned in Russian sources as Mordvin Princes

== Administration ==
The Principality was divided into belyaks.

== Population ==
The land was inhabited mainly by Mokshas, Mishars and Erzyas. Some Burtases resettled to Northern Mokshaland, and would be mentioned in later Russian documents as Posop Tatars since they served as the prince's army bread suppliers and paid bread tax.

== See also ==
- Qasim Khanate
- Mukhsha Ulus
- Mordvin Princes
- Golden Horde
