= Mordovka =

Historical Russian coin in Volga region

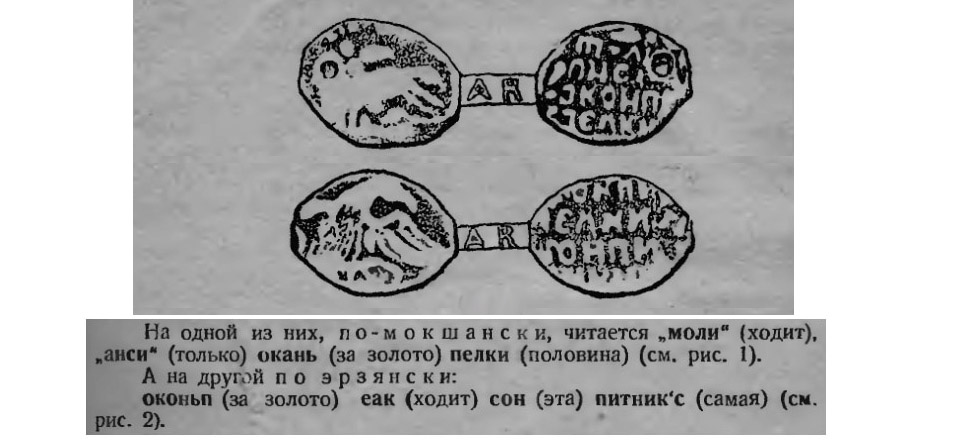
Depiction of mordovki by Zaikovsky, text by Cherapkin (1929)

Mordovka (Russian: мордовка, pl. мордовки, mordovki) were minted or cast silver and copper plates made in the Middle and Lower Volga region during the 16th to 18th centuries. The obverse side usually featured coarse, stylized images of a horseman, horse, bird, and other figures. The reverse side had inscriptions made from sets of letters, often imitating Russian kopecks. According to the Kazan Chronicle, mordovki, referred to as pieces of silver (серебреники) in chronicle, were used as both adornment sewn on clothes and as coins.

A distinctive version of the mordovki had a triangular design. They sometimes depict a woman in a tall headdress. Numerous hoards containing large numbers of mordovki have been discovered in the Volga Region and Central Asia.

== Etymology ==
The term mordovka (Russian: мордовка lit.'Mordvin woman') is in use since 19th century among Russian numismatists for all similar coins or tokens found in Volga region.

== History ==
Russian ethnographer Bogdan Zaikovsky had been collecting this kind coins for more than 30 years and divided his corpus in two classes he called Type A and type B. Type B coins or tokens were made of different alloys and used mostly in Moksha women traditional costumes as decoration. Zaikovsky notes that even he himself knows one of the places where this kind of craft was produced (Traka village). He points at the fact that Tatar, Kyrgyz or Russian women never use them as decoration. Moreover, a legend exists they were money in old times. Interesting that he notes the coins are called mordvki or mortki when mordka was a term for Old Russian coin equal to 1/400 of a ruble which as he comments "never existed". He never received a positive reaction from Russian numismatists as they all believed these coins are just decoration tokens or "Post-Peter kopecks imitations". They hadn't share Zaikovsky's enthusiasm regarding his findings since they just did not believe the mere idea that Mordvins considered illiterate village folk could ever have their own money. He lists hidden treasure cites with buckets of mordovkas found and attract numismatists community's attention to the problem of the existing early monetary systems in Volga region and coins authenticity.

== Type A coins ==
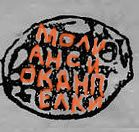
Zaikovskiy's picture of the mordovka type A with inscription in Old Moksha language highlighted

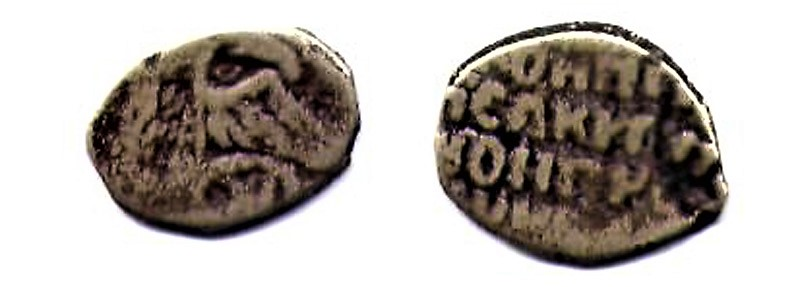
Mordovka coin A Type. Inscription in Old Erzya language

Type A are minted of silver and look like authentic coins. They have readable inscriptions. Saratov State University scholar Iosif Cherapkin, expert in Moksha language, had examined type A coins and confirmed their authenticity. Inscription resembled Cyrillic without soft signs and was readable in Old (Middle) Moksha and says 'It circulates as 1/2 of gold'.

=== Cherapkin's Inscription ===
ΜΟΛИ ΑΗСИ ΟΚΑΗ ΠЄΛΚИ
moli ansi okan pelki
Моли аньцек окань пяли
Goes only for half gold

Cherapkin's inscription on the coins as had been attested is written in Old or precisely Middle Moksha in Greek uncial script with digamma 'ͷ' or an unknown variant of Cyrillic without soft signs. Three of the four word forms are older that those attested in Nicolaes Witsen's Dutch-Moksha dictionary issued in 1692 The word Moksha: пелки, romanized: pelki, lit. 'half' is attested in Old Khanty language пелки (pelki) 'half' in a given name which is nowadays considered archaic and the word consequently is obsolete. The contemporary Khanty term is "пелəк (pelək)" half. Another inscription on a mordovka was in Old Erzya in the same script with the similar meaning.

=== Triangle Moksha coins ===
Zavariukhin describes as well 22x23 mm size triangle form silver coins with obverse featured a woman's bust. Those coins first were described by Vladimir Aunovsky in 1869, he reports they are used in traditional Moksha woman's headdress decoration and they say that was their queen depiction, meaning princess Narchat.

=== Bracteates ===
Evgeny Arsiukhin describes his collection from Chuvashia and divides his corpus into complex 1 and complex 2. Complex 1 is a 2001 hidden treasure assemblage found in Chuvashia includes mordovkas and Ruthenian coins. Complex 2 is a collection of coins from old Chuvashian tukhya used before as a decoration. Complex 1 with Ф-tamga include a bracteate with "Cyrillic inscription in 18th century manner". Spassky previously pointed out at huge amount of false coins in Muscovy mint but this type bracteate seems to be formed much earlier, between 1547 and 1565.

== See also ==
- Narchat
- Mukhsha
- Mukhsha Ulus

== Bibliography ==
- Feoktistov, Aleksandr; Saarinen, Sirkka (2005), Mokšamordvan murteet [Dialects of Moksha Mordvin], Suomalais-Ugrilaisen Seuran toimituksia (in Finnish), Helsinki: Suomalais-Ugrilainen Seura, ISBN 952-5150-86-0
- Mashkov V.V. Monety vostochno-slavianskogo prigranichya. Yekaterinburg, SV-96, 1998, pp. 234–235
- Nesterov I. V. Mordovki - padcheritsy russkoy monetnoy sistemy. Faizkhanovskiye chtenia. Materials of 5th annual scientific and practical conference. Moscow, Nizhny Novgorod, 2009
- Shitov, V. N. (2004). Мордовия: Энциклопедия. Т. 2 (М—Я). Saransk: Институт гуманитарных наук при Правительстве Республики Мордовия. p. 22. ISBN 5-900029-08-5.
- Zverev S.V. Printsipy formirovania tipov podrazhatelnykh monet Kazanskogo khanstva. Ob izobrazheniyakh na mordovkakh. Sovetsky kollektsioner. Moscow, 1991. No 28
