= Belyak (unit) =

Administrative unit in Volga Finnic states

Belyak was a fief or administrative subdivision in Medieval Volga Finnic states.

== Etymology ==
The same as beylik, equivalent of county in other parts of Europe.

== Medieval Volga Finnic States ==
Temnikov Principality and Mordvin Horde were divided into belyaks. After Russian Colonization they transformed into uyezds, modern day raions and aimaks in Mordovia.

== See also ==
- Aimak – administrative subdivision in Mordovia
- El, ancient Volga Finnic term for country, state. See Mari El, Udmurt Elkun, Moxel (Mokshaland)
