= Sheleg =

Sheleg may refer to:

- Bambi Sheleg (1958–2016), Israeli journalist
- Ehud Sheleg (born 1955), British-Israeli businessman
- Sheleg Ba'sharav, 2012 studio album by Israeli singer Shiri Maimon
- Sheleg, a type of Khazar-minted coin
