= Khazar coinage =

Sheleg minted in Kabir, Khazar Khaganate since ca 5th c AD

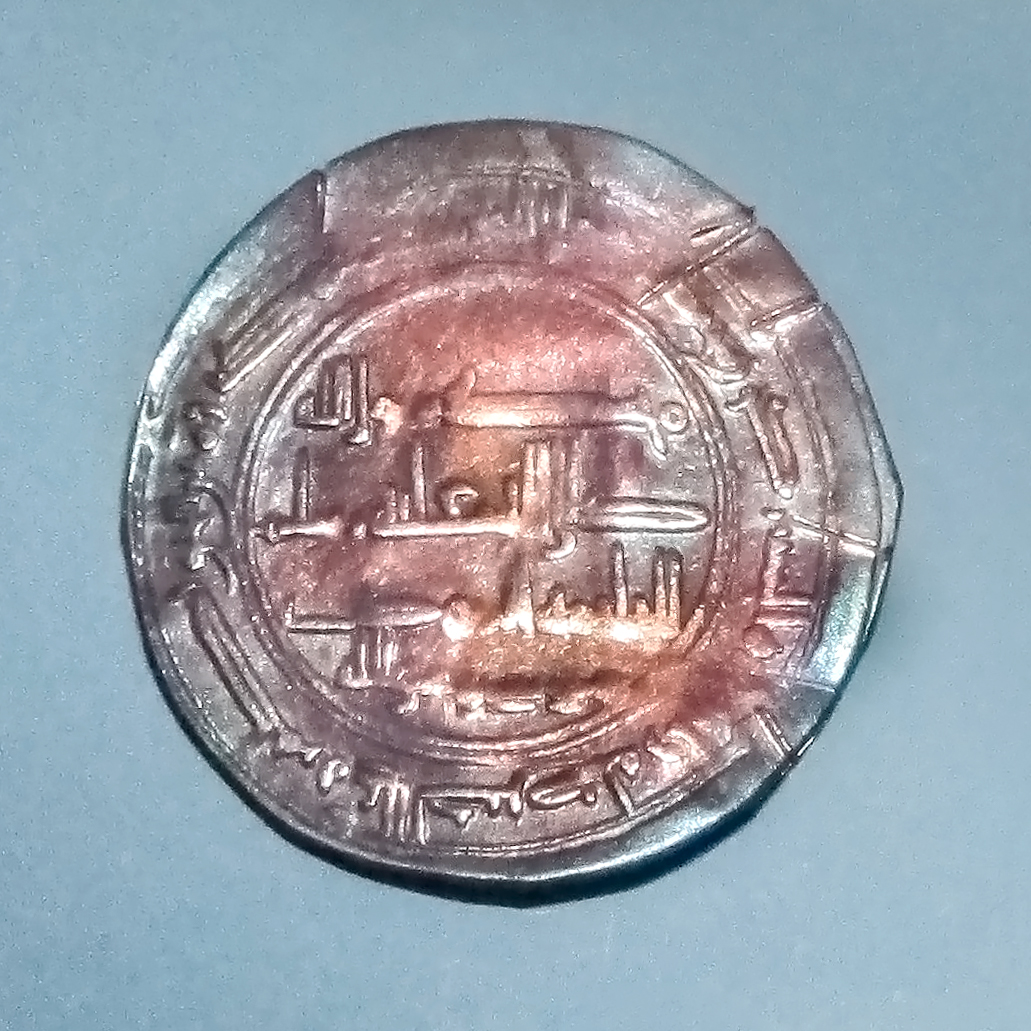
Khazar sheleg bearing the Arabic-language legend "Moses is the prophet of God", early 9th c. CE from the Spillings Hoard

Yarmaq was name for Khazar Khaganate currency. The term for silver coin was sheleg (it might have direct connection to the term shekel. The currency was mentioned in the Tale of Bygone Years as tribute money for Vyatichi and other Khazar subjects Old East Slavic: щеляг, romanized: schelyag. Shelegs were probably minted in Kabir (Moxel, client state of Khazar Kaghanate) since approximately 5th c AD. The term for the gold coin might be oka, as they were minted in the same place and called oka (Moksha: ока, romanized: oka, lit. 'gold')

== Etymology ==
The term meant Moksha: ярмак, romanized: yarmak, lit. 'money' since at least early Middle Ages, no other meanings had been attested.

=== Other versions ===
Ar- or yar- evolved from the verb "to cut longitudinally, to split", Turkish verb is also co-originating with the Old Turkic word ır- or yır- which means the same. The name is similar to Mongolian language word "yaarmag" meaning "market," especially outdoor ones that sell wide variety of goods.

== Resources ==
- Roman K. Kovalev. "What Does Historical Numismatics Suggest About the Monetary History of Khazaria in the Ninth Century? – Question Revisited." Archivum Eurasiae Medii Aevi 13 (2004): 97–129.
- Roman K. Kovalev. "Creating Khazar Identity through Coins: The Special Issue Dirhams of 837/8." East Central and Eastern Europe in the Early Middle Ages, ed. Florin Curta, pp. 220–253. Ann Arbor, MI: University of Michigan Press, 2005.
- Mokshin, Nikolay (2012), "At Sources Of The Mordovian-Jewish Ethnocultural Ties", Social and Political Science (in Russian) (4): 6–8
- Serebrenikov, B.A.; Feoktistov, A.P.; Polyakov, O.Y., eds. (1998) [First published 1998]. Moksha-Russian Dictionary (in Russian). Digora. ISBN 5-200-02012-3.
- Herrala, Eva; Feoktistov, Aleksandr (1998). Mokšalais-Suomalainen sanakirja. Turku: University of Turku. p. 54. ISBN 951-29-1244-9.

== See also ==
- Khazar coinage
