= Atämaz =

13th-century Moksha prince

- Prince
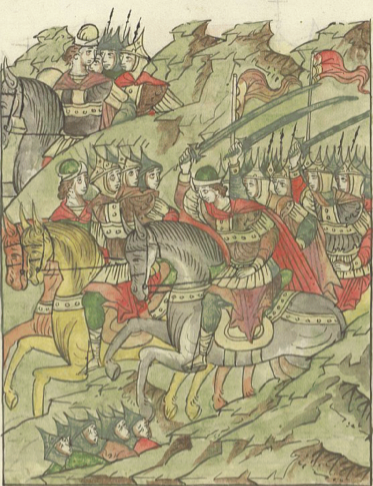
- Erzya-Moksha War. Atämaz attacks Purgaz under Obran Osh. Miniature from the Illustrated Chronicle of Ivan the Terrible (16th century).
- Died: 9 April 1241; Legnica, Duchy of Legnica
- Father: Puresh
- Occupation: Prince

Atämaz (Moksha: Атямас, romanized: Atiamas, lit. 'belonging to Atäm (Thunder God)') was a 13th-century Moksha prince. He was the son of Kanazor (King) Puresh and brother of Queen Narchat.

== History ==
In 1230 Purgaz laid siege to Nizhny Novgorod but was defeated. After that the son of Puresh with his Polovtsi allies raided into Purgaz's lands and completely destroyed his kingdom.

== Literature ==
- Hakluyt, Richard (1599). "The iournal of frier William de Rubruquis a French man of the order of minorite friers, unto the east parts of the worlde A. Dom. 1253". The Principal Navigations Voyages Traffiques and Discoveries of the English Nation (in English and Latin). Vol. 1. London: George Bishop, Ralph Newberie, and Robert Baker. pp. 71–92 Latin text, 93–117 English translation. Based on British Library MS Royal 14.C.XIII Fol. 225r-236r and thus ends prematurely.
- Opus Majus, Volume I in the Internet Archive – original text in Latin (including Part IV), ed. by John Henry Bridges, 1900.
- Shterenshis, Michael (2013), Tamerlane and the Jews, London and New York: Routledge, ISBN 9781136873669
- Mayorov, Aleksandr (2021). "Woman, Diplomacy and War. Russian Princes In Negotiations With Batu Before Mongol Invasion". Шаги/Steps (in Russian). 7 (3). Steps Journal: 124–199.
