= Uncle's Dream =

1859 novella by Fyodor Dostoevsky

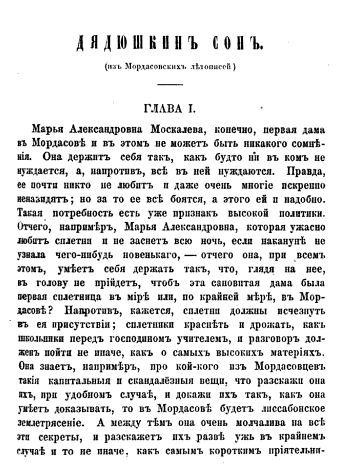
- Author: Fyodor Dostoevsky
- Original title: Дядюшкин сон (Dyadyushkin son)
- Language: Russian
- Publisher: Russkoye Slovo
- Publication place: Russia
- Preceded by: Netochka Nezvanova
- Followed by: The Village of Stepanchikovo

Uncle's Dream (Russian: Дядюшкин сон, Dyadyushkin son) is an 1859 novella by Russian writer Fyodor Dostoevsky. The first work of Dostoevsky after a long pause, the novella was written during the author's stay in Semipalatinsk. It was first published in the Russian magazine Russkoye Slovo (1859, No. 3).

== Plot ==
The action of the story takes place in the city of Mordasovo, where Mariya Aleksandrovna Moskaleva lives, an energetic lady with a 23-year-old daughter. Her daughter, Zinaida, rejects the proposals of her only boyfriend, Pavel Aleksandrovich Mozglyakov, and there are no other worthy gentlemen in their small town. In addition, Zinaida still loves the poor district teacher, whom her mother did not allow her to marry. Mariya dreams of marrying Zinaida to Prince K..

One day, Prince K. stops at the Moskaleva's house - a gentleman of a very respectable age, suffering, according to the townspeople, from senile dementia and outwardly resembling a "dead man on springs." While talking with the guest, Mariya develops a plan: to marry him to her daughter. Zinaida at first ardently rejects any talk of a wedding, but her mother argues that the girl has a special mission - in marriage, she will be a sister of mercy for her husband, and after his death, she will become a rich and free princess.

Mariya Aleksandrovna makes a lot of efforts to implement her plan. As a result, the prince, having relaxed from drinks and Zinaida's singing, agrees to marry her. However, the next morning it turns out that K. remembers the recent events very vaguely, and Pavel manages to convince the “uncle” that he saw his upcoming wedding in a dream. When the deception is revealed, Zinaida honestly admits her guilt, and the prince, touched by her sincerity, reports that it would be a great honor for him to offer his hand and heart to such a girl.

Everything that happened becomes a strong shock for K., and three days later he dies in his hotel room. Pavel hits on Zinaida again, but, having been refused, leaves for St. Petersburg. Having sold their property, Mariya and Zinaida leave Mordasovo. A few years later, fate will bring them together at a ball in a distant land.

== Background ==
Work on the novella began after a long creative pause, associated with his exile in the Omsk prison camp, and later when he was forced to serve in the Siberian Army Corps in Semipalatinsk. The author was prompted to create it not only by the desire to return to literary activity, but also by financial difficulties. In 1858, in a letter addressed to the publicist Mikhail Katkov, Dostoevsky made it clear that he was in dire need of money: "If you would like to have my novel for publication this year, then can you send me now, in advance for the novel, the 500 rubles that I lack and urgently need, in silver."

Researchers have not been able to establish an exact date for the start of work on Uncle's Dream. Dostoevsky sent the finished manuscript to Russkoye Slovo in January 1859. In March, the story was already printed. Subsequently, recalling the history of its creation, Dostoevsky admitted: "I wrote it in Siberia [...] solely with the aim of starting in the literary field again, and terribly afraid of censorship (as a former exile). That is why I involuntarily wrote that little thing of dove-like mildness and wonderful innocence."
