= Mordvin Tatars =

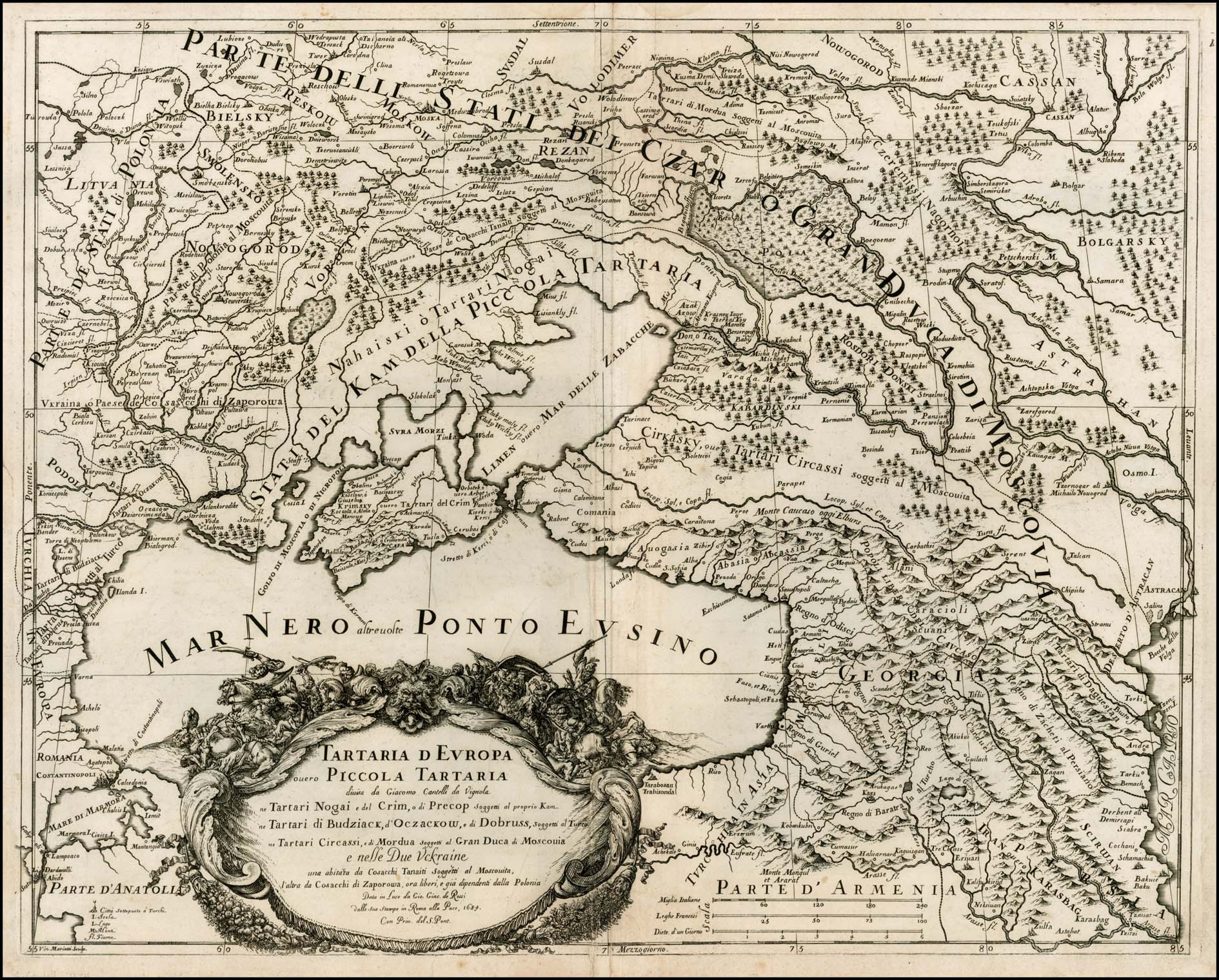
Mordvin Tatars subject to Muscovy in 1684 in Giacomo Cantelli map

Mordvin Tatars (Russian: Мордовские татары, Italian: Tartari di Mordua) was a term used to refer to medieval nobility of Volga Tatar, Volga Finnic, and Burtas descent serving Grand Duchy of Moscow.

The term was used interchangeably with the term Mordvin princes (Russian: Мордовские князья) in 15-16th centuries in official documents of Grand Duchy of Moscow. First the term was applied to pagan princes.

== Noble families ==
Tümen Princes Kugushevs (ethnic Mishar) and Rasts (ethnic Moksha) were mentioned as Mordvin princes. The latter also sometimes referred to as Siberian. Possibly Tyumen and Tümen are mixed.

According to Stefan Kuznetsov: "There are 55 princely families of Mordvin and Mordvin-Tatar descent (e.g. Devlet-Kildeyev, Yedelev (Volga Finnic), Yengalychev, Yenikeyev (Mishar clan), Kildyushev, Kugushev, Kudashev, Kulomzin (Volga Finnic, disputable Erzya or Meryan), Maksutov, Tenishev, Chevkin, Chegodayev, Shuguruv, etc. some of them use the princely title, others only consider themselves princes"

More princley families list Ivan Smirnov and Vladimir Velʹi͡aminov-Zernov: Yenikeyev (founder Yenikey-murza Kuldyashev of Moksha descent), Shugurov (Moksha), Smilenev (Moksha), Prosandeyev p.94, Alekseyev (Volga Finnic), Andreyev (Volga Finnic), Bayushev, Engalychev, Ichalov (Erzya), Izdebersky (Volga Finnic), Karamzin, Kazurov (Volga Finnic), Kildishev (Volga Finnic), Kizhedeyev (Volga Finnic), Kuprin, Lapin (Volga Finnic), Maksheyev (Moksha),Meshchersky (Moksha), Mokshazarov (Volga Finnic), Mordvinov (Moksha), Mushkubeyev (Volga Finnic), Pavlov (Volga Finnic), Razgildeyev (disputable Volga Tatar or Volga Finnic descent), Romodanov (Volga Finnic), Tyapin (Volga Finnic), Kirdyakov, Sheysupov (Tatar).

== See also ==
- List of Qasim Khans

== Literature ==
- Vladimir Velyaminov-Zernov. Studies on Kasimovskij kings and princes (published in "Proceedings of the Eastern Division of the Imperial Archaeological Society, Part IX, X, XI, 1863 - 1866, h. XII, 1887
