= Iosif Cherapkin =

Creator of Moksha literary language (1884–1935)

Professor Iosif Cherapkin
- Иосиф Григорьевич Черапкин
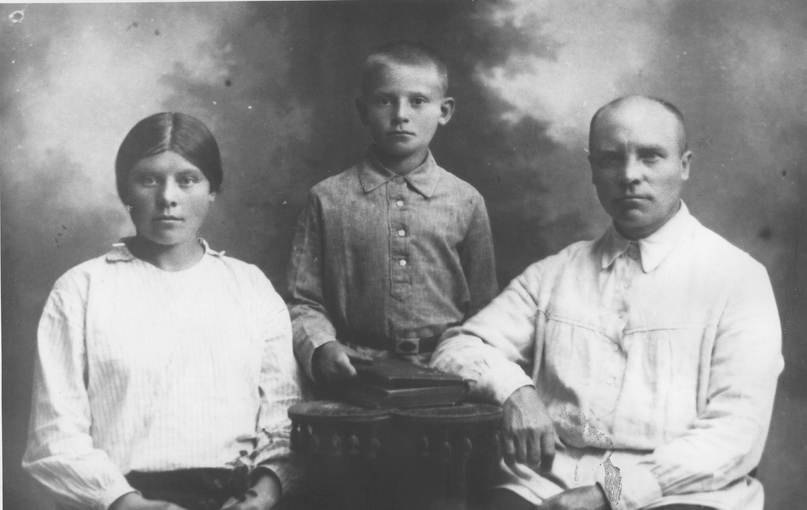
- Iosif Cherapkin and his family: spouse Lukeria Nikiforovna and son Nikolay. 1928
- Born: Черапонь Осе; March 11, 1884
- Died: March 18, 1935 (aged 74); Isaprä
- Citizenship: Russian Empire, USSR
- Education: Moscow University
- Known for: Establishing Moksha literary language, Moksha-Russian Dictionary with Grammar (1933), Moksha School textbooks (1933–1934)
- Spouse: Lukieria Cherapkina
- Children: Nikolay Cherapkin and other 10
- Scientific career
- Fields: History, Philology
- Workplaces: Saratov State University, Communist High School, Saransk Pedagogical Institute, Research Institute for Mordvinian Culture
- Thesis: Moksha language Spassk, Krasnoslobodsk-Temnikov and Insar Dialects (1913)

Iosif Cherapkin (Moksha: Черапонь Осе, Russian: Ио́сиф Григо́рьевич Чера́пкин) (15 November [O.S. 3 November] 1884, Staryye Verkhissy (Moksha: Исапря), Penza Oblast, today's Mordovia – March 18, 1935) was a Moksha enlightener, educator, and linguist.

== Biography ==
During Russo-Japanese War, Cherapkin was conscripted into the Russian Imperial Army. He finished teacher's seminary in 1906 and worked as teacher in his village school. For his activity aiming to popularize school education in Moksha language he was banished to Siberia. He returned in 1912 and enrolled Moscow University and studied history and philology. He lived in Belgium, France and Germany and returned home in 1915. He welcomed October Revolution and joined Red Army during Civil War. Bolshevik Korenizatsiya (nativization) policy was aimed at de-Russification. The government established ethnic autonomies and republics with their own governments in Russia. They supported minorities and even ethnic Russians working in said governments were required to learn the local language and culture of the given Soviet republic or autonomy. All parties and political activity were banned in Soviet Russia and in 1921 he was arrested as suspect supporter of 'SR' (Social-Revolutionary party) but soon released as his guilty was not proved. Cherapkin met Makar Evsevʹev and was influenced by him. He described Moksha dialects and divided them in 3 groups: Spassk, Krasnoslobodsk-Temnikov and Insar dialects. Krasnoslobodsk-Temnikov dialect was chosen as the basis for the Moksha literary language. He completed the work on the grammar and described phonetics, morphology and syntax. In 1924 he worked as a secretary in Moksha newspaper Од веле ('New Village') and as a lecturer in Saratov State University in 1929. In 1931 he started working as a Moksha teacher in Saransk komvuz (Communist High School, today's Mordovian State University), Saransk Pedagogical Institute (today's Evsevʹev Mordovian State Pedagogical Institute) and Research Institute for Mordvinian Culture (today's Mordovian Scientific Research Institute of Language, Literature and Economy).

=== Medieval Moksha writing ===
Cherapkin was the first to identify Medieval Moksha writing in Greek uncial script in 1929.

=== Notable works and death ===
His first Moksha-Russian dictionary with grammar was issued in 1931. He used plausible neologisms (e.g. Moksha terms for parts of speech, socio-political terms etc.) and prepared first school textbooks in Moksha literary language which were issued in 1933–1934. He died in 1935. After the end of korenizatsiya course by 1938 the new and old terms were banned and replaced with abundance of Russian loans. As well as school textbooks and education in Moksha language except for 1–4 years of study in Elementary schools in order to help children shift to Russian as language of instruction. All the Moksha books, journals and newspapers were withdrawn from the libraries. Some Moksha and other Finno-Ugric languages books, journals and manuscripts were digitalised in 21st century and accessible at National Library of Finland.

== Family ==
Cherapkin's spouse's name was Lukeria. They married after he returned from Russo-Japanese War. They had 11 children (including 3 children of his deceased brother Grigoriy): Nikolay, Iosif, Agrippina, Anna, Ekaterina (other names are unknown). Nikolay Cherapkin later became writer and literary critic.

== Bibliography ==
- Черапкин И. Г. Диалекты мордвы-мокши бывшей Пензенской губернии [Moksha dialects of Former Penza Gubernia]//Учёные записки Саратовского университета. 1930. Issue.3.8. pp. 19–31
- Черапкин И. Г. Самоучитель мокша-мордовского языка для русских [Moksha Language Self-study Manual for Adults]. Ч. 1-я. Под ред. Л. Е. Бажанова. Саранск, Мордиздат, 1932
- Черапкин И. Г. Мокша-мордовско-русский словарь с грамматическим справочником [Moksha-Russian Dictionary and Grammar Guide]. — МордГИЗ, 1933

== Translations ==
- Интернационалсь (The Internationale by Eugène Pottier)// Валда ян (Bright Way), monthly journal. 1928, No 3(4), May. p. 18 (in Moksha)
- Максим Горький. Тядясь (Maxim Gorky. Mother)/ Колхозонь эряф (Kolkhoz life) journal, 1933 (in Moksha)

== Sources ==
- Sukharev, A.I. (2004) [First published 2003]. "Cherapkin Iosif Grigoryevich". Mordovia Encyclopedia. Vol. 2. Mordovian Publishing. ISBN 5-900029-08-5.
- Zaikovsky, Bogdan (1929). "Mordovkas Problem". Nizhne-Volzhskaya Oblast Ethnological Scientific Society Review (36–2). Saratov: 30–32.
- Kreindler, Isabelle (1985). "The Mordvinians: A doomed Soviet nationality?". Cahiers du Monde Russe 26-1. 26: 43–62. doi:10.3406/cmr.1985.2030.
- Lipatov, Stepan (1994). "Selmon pazhit". Moksha (6). Saransk: 43–45.
- Kuklin, Vyacheslav (1993). "Mezenksa shavondoz af muvorufnen". Moksha (1). Saransk: 72–74.
