= Bey =

Honorific title in Turkic languages

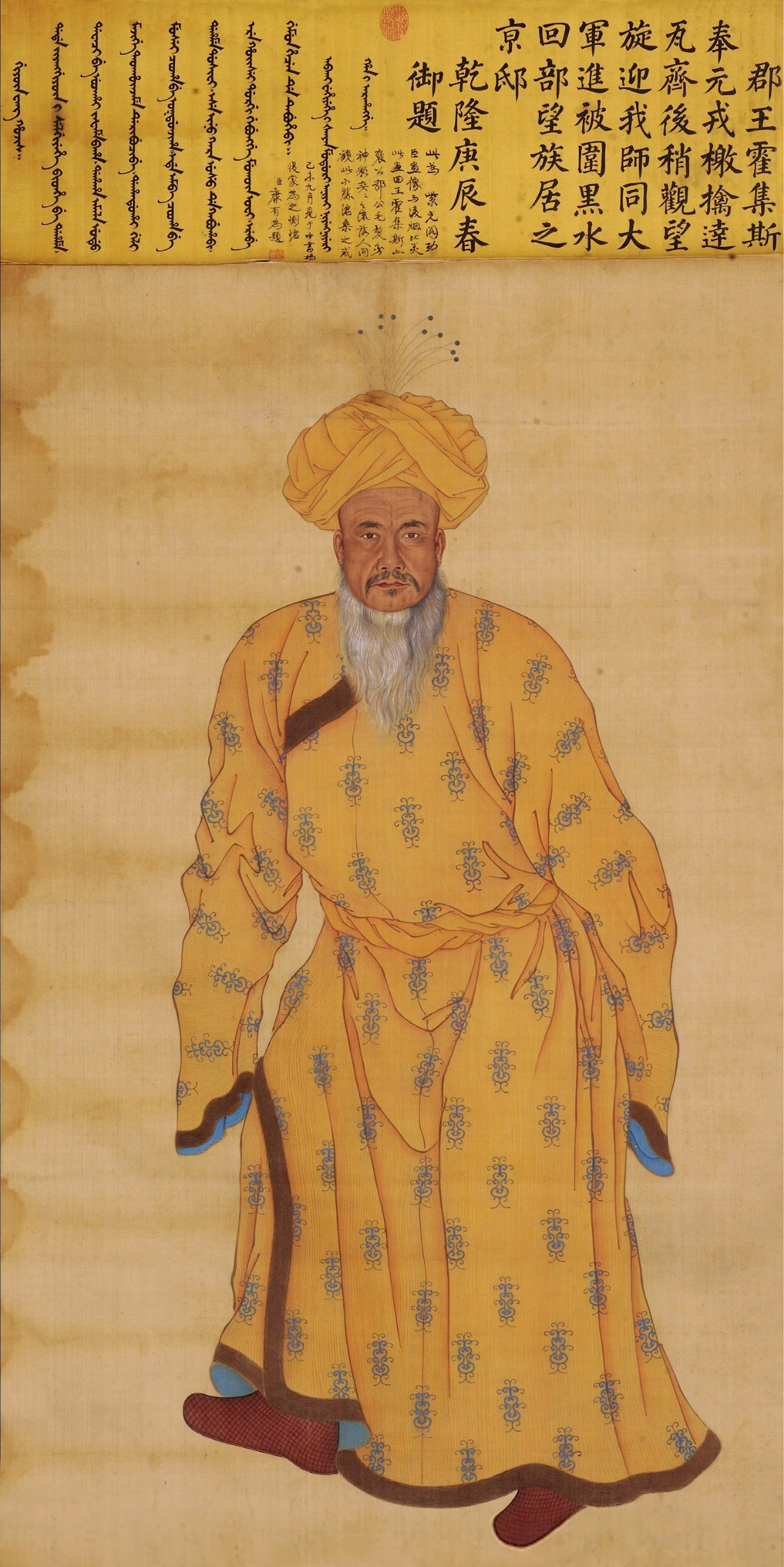
Uyghur General Khojis (d. 1781), Bey of Turfan, who later settled in Beijing; painting by a European Jesuit artist at the Chinese court in 1775

Bey, (Note: Ottoman Turkish: بك, romanized: beğ, Turkish: bey, Azerbaijani: bəy, Turkmen: beg, Uzbek: бек, Kurdish: بەگ, romanized: beg, Kazakh: би/бек, Kyrgyz: бий/бек, Tatar: бәк, romanized: bäk, Shor: пий/пек, Albanian: beu/bej, Croatian: beg, Serbian: beg, Persian: بیگ, romanized: beyg/beig, Urdu: بیگ, romanized: beg/baig, Tajik: бек, Arabic: بيه, بك, romanized: bēh, bek) also spelled as Baig, Bayg, Beigh, Beig, Bek, Baeg, Begh, Beg, or Beğ, is a Turkic title for a chieftain, and a royal, aristocratic title traditionally applied to people with special lineages to the leaders or rulers of variously sized areas in the numerous Turkic kingdoms, emirates, sultanates and empires in Central Asia, South Asia, Southeast Europe, and the Middle East, such as the Seljuks, Ottomans, Timurids or the various khanates and emirates in Central Asia and the Eurasian Steppe. The feminine equivalent title was begum. The regions or provinces where "beys" ruled or which they administered were called beylik, roughly meaning "governorate" or "region" (the equivalent of a county, duchy, grand duchy or principality in Europe, depending on the size and importance of the beylik). However, the exact scope of power handed to the beys varied with each country; thus, there was no clear-cut system rigidly applied to all countries defining the power and prestige that came along with the title.

Today, the word is still used formally as a social title for men, similar to the way the titles "sir" and "mister" are used in the English language. Additionally, it is widely used in the naming customs of Central Asia, namely in countries such as Uzbekistan, Kazakhstan and Kyrgyzstan. Notably, the ethnic designation of Uzbeks comes from the name of Öz Beg Khan of the Golden Horde, being an example of the usage of this word in personal names and even names of whole ethnic groups. The general rule is that the honorific is used with first names and not with surnames or last names.

== Etymology ==
The word entered English from the Turkish bey,. Its Old Turkic cognate beg, which – in the form bäg – has been mentioned as early as in the 8th century AD Orkhon inscriptions and is usually translated as "tribal leader". The actual origin of the word is still disputed, though it is mostly agreed that it was a loan-word, in Old Turkic. This Turkic word is usually considered a borrowing from an Iranian language. However, German Turkologist Gerhard Doerfer assessed the derivation from Iranian as superficially attractive but quite uncertain, and pointed out the possibility that the word may be genuinely Turkic. Two principal etymologies have been proposed by scholars:

1. the Middle Persian title bag (also baγ or βaγ, Old Iranian baga; cf. Sanskrit भग / bhaga) meaning "lord" and "master". Peter Golden derives the word via Sogdian bġy from the same Iranian root. All Middle Iranian languages retain forms derived from baga- in the sense "god": Middle Persian bay (plur. bayān, baʾān), Parthian baγ, Bactrian bago, Sogdian βγ-, and were used as honorific titles of kings and other men of high rank in the meaning of "lord". The Iranian bāy (through connection with Old Indian noun bhāgá "possessions, lot") gave the now-obsolete Turkish word bay (rich); compare Mongolian Bayan.
2. the Chinese title po (Mandarin bó (伯); its historical pronunciation being pak or pe^{r}jk, as reconstructed by Edwin Pulleyblank), meaning older brother or a feudal lord, traditionally equated to a European count.

It was also used by the Uyghurs. It permitted the Turkic Begs in the Altishahr region to maintain their previous status, and they administered the area for the Qing as officials. High-ranking Begs were allowed to call themselves Begs.

== Turkish beys ==
Lucy Mary Jane Garnett wrote in the 1904 work Turkish Life in Town and Country that "distinguished persons and their sons" as well as "high government officials" could become bey, which was one of two "merely conventional designations as indefinite as our 'Esquire' has come to be [in the United Kingdom]".

The Republican Turkish authorities abolished the title around the 1930s.

The title Bey, Baig or Begum, Begzada and Uç Bey are regarded as comparable to the European nobility with the title of Viscount, while Sancak-beys and Atabegs are considered to be of an equivalent rank to earls or counts in the context of European nobility.

== Beys elsewhere ==
The title bey (Arabic: بيه Egyptian Arabic pronunciation: [beː]) was also called beyk or bek (بيك) – from Turkish beyg (بيـگ) – in North Africa, including Egypt. A bey could maintain a similar office within Arab states that broke away from the High Porte, such as Egypt and Sudan under the Muhammad Ali Dynasty, where it was a rank below pasha (maintained in two rank classes after 1922), and a title of courtesy for a pasha's son.

Even much earlier, the virtual sovereign's title in Barbaresque North African 'regency' states was "Bey" (compare Dey). Notably in Tunis, the Husainid Dynasty used a whole series of title and styles including Bey:

- Just Bey itself was part of the territorial title of the ruler, and also as a title used by all male members of the family (rather like Sultan in the Ottoman dynasty).
- Bey al-Kursi "Bey of the Throne", a term equivalent to reigning prince.
- Bey al-Mahalla "Bey of the Camp", title used for the next most senior member of the Beylical family after the reigning Bey, the Heir Apparent to the throne.
- Bey al-Taula "Bey of the Table", the title of the Heir Presumptive, the eldest prince of the Beylical family, who enjoyed precedence immediately after the Bey al-Mahalla.
- Beylerbeyi (or Beglerbegi) "Lord of Lords", was the administrative rank formally enjoyed by the ruler of Algiers and by rulers of parts of the Balkans in their official capacity of Ottoman Governor-General within the Turkish empire.This title was also used in Safavid empire.

Bey was also the title that was awarded by the Ottoman Sultan in the twilight of the Ottoman Empire to Oloye Mohammed Shitta, an African merchant prince of the Yoruba people who served as a senior leader of the Muslim community in the kingdom of Lagos. Subsequently, he and his children became known in Nigeria by the double-barrelled surname Shitta-Bey, a tradition which has survived to the present day through their lineal descendants.

In the Ottoman period, the lords of the semi-autonomous Mani Peninsula used the title of beis (μπέης); for example, Petros Mavromichalis was known as Petrobey.

Other Beys saw their own Beylik promoted to statehood, e.g.:

- in Qusantina (Constantine in French), an Ottoman district subject to the Algiers regency since 1525 (had its own Beys since 1567), the last incumbent, Ahmed Bey ben Mohamed Chérif (b. c. 1784, in office 1826–1848, d. 1850), was maintained when in 1826 the local Kabyle population declared independence, and when it was on 13 October 1837 conquered by France, until it was incorporated into Algeria in 1848.

Bey or a variation has also been used as an aristocratic title in various Turkic states, such as Bäk in the Tatar Khanate of Kazan, in charge of a Beylik called Bäklek. The Uzbek Khanate of Khiva, Emirate of Bukhara and The Khanate of Kokand used the "beks" as local administrations of "bekliks" or provinces. The Balkar princes in the North Caucasus highlands were known as taubiy (taubey), meaning the "mountainous chief".

Sometimes a Bey was a territorial vassal within a khanate, as in each of the three zuzes under the Khan of the Kazakhs.

The variation Beg, Baig or Bai, is still used as a family name or a part of a name in South and Central Asia as well as the Balkans. In Slavic-influenced names, it can be seen in conjunction with the Slavic -ov/-ović/ev suffixes meaning "son of", such as in Bakir and Alija Izetbegović, and Abai Kunanbaev.

The title is also used as an honorific by members of the Moorish Science Temple of America and the Moorish Orthodox Church.

Bey is also used colloquially in Urdu-speaking parts of India, and its usage is similar to "chap" or "man". When used aggressively, it is an offensive term.

The Hungarian word bő originates from an Old Turkic loanword, cognate with Ottoman 'bey', that used to mean 'clan leader' in Old Hungarian. Later, as an adjective, it acquired the meaning of "rich". Its contemporary meaning is "ample" or "baggy" (when referring to clothing).

In the Armenian Melikdoms of Karabakh, the younger brothers and sons of the meliks (local rulers) were addressed as bek, which was placed after their given names.

== See also ==
- Ban
- Biy – a judge and senator in Kazakh khanate
- Begum
- Belyak (unit)
- Beylerbey
- Begzada
- Atabeg
- Dey
- Khagan Bek
- Skanderbeg
- Bai Baianai
- Anatolian beyliks
- Ottoman titles
- Abaza Family
