= Puresh =

13th-century Moksha ruler

- Successor: Narchat
- Died: 9 April 1241; Legnica, Duchy of Legnica
- Issue: Atämaz; Narchat

Puresh (Moksha: Пуреш, romanized: Puresh) was a Moksha ruler in the Middle Volga.

== Reign ==
In the 1230s, the Erzyan king Purgaz and the Mokshan king Puresh were at war, and while Purgaz was allied with Volga Bulgaria, Puresh was an ally of Grand Prince Yuri II of Vladimir.

== See also ==
- Narchat
- Atämaz
