= Eretz Acheret =

Israeli NGO and magazine

- ארץ אחרת
- Formation: 2000; 26 years ago
- Founder: Bambi Sheleg
- Founded at: Israel
- Purpose: Produces magazines, website, and conferences on selected topics
- Official language: Hebrew, English
- Editor-in-chief: Bambi Sheleg

Eretz Acheret (Hebrew: ארץ אחרת, “A Different Place”) is an independent, not-for-profit organization in Israel that produces a bi-monthly Hebrew magazine, periodic English magazines, a bilingual website, and conferences. Each magazine is dedicated to a selected topic, and the conferences around publication of each issue supplement the magazines.

== Philosophy ==
Bambi Sheleg is the founder and editor-in-chief. Sheleg worked as a journalist for the Israeli daily Ma'ariv for many years before founding Eretz Acheret and had her own news commentary corner on Channel 2 television news. Eretz Acheret is a not-for-profit publication that is free from what Sheleg calls a “media of distraction” that concentrates on scandals, celebrity and hype. Eretz Acheret seeks to de-emphasize stories about extremism in an attempt to find a common social agenda for all sectors of Israel society.

== History ==
Since 2000, Eretz Acheret has produced a bi-monthly magazine highlighting the work of people and organizations working towards renewal and change. In addition, Eretz Acheret facilitates conferences, discussions and other forums for cultural dialogue and debate on topics that parallel those discussed in the magazine. Eretz Acheret also hosts an English content website and plans to publish a tri-lingual Internet magazine in English, Hebrew and Arabic.
