= Purgaz =

Erzya prince, ruler of the Erzya country in the 1200s

Inäzor Purgaz
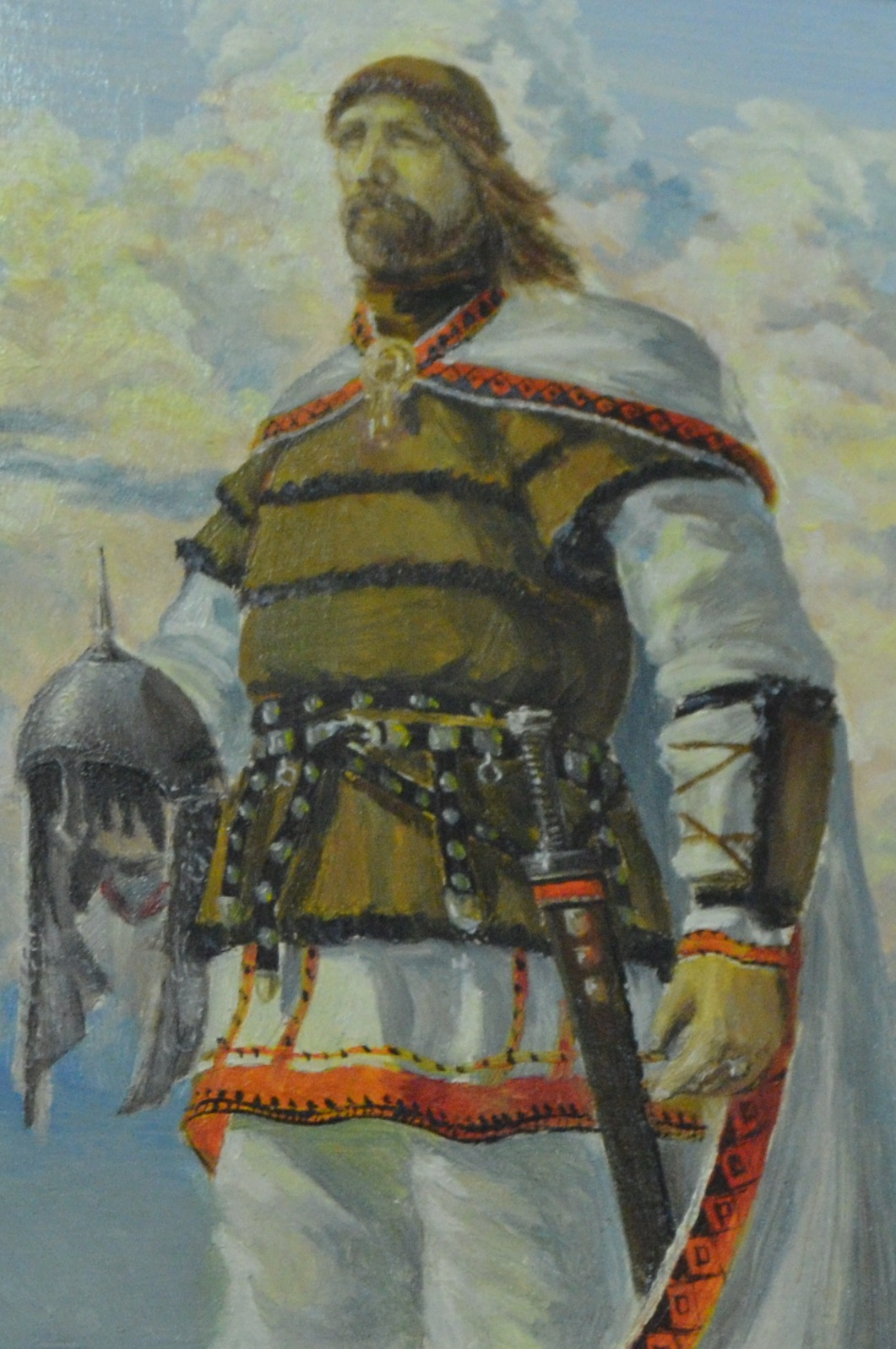
- Inyazor Purgaz by Pavel Alyoshin, 2017
- Reign: ?–1239
- Died: 1239

Purgaz or Inäzor Purgaz (Erzya: Пургаз (Инязор Пургаз); Russian: Пургас, romanized: Purgas) was an Erzyan (Mordvin) leader in the first half of the 13th century. He was the ruler (inäzor) of the Principality of Purgaz. Being an ally of Volga Bulgaria, he resisted the Suzdal Russians' expansion into the region. In later times, he became a symbol of Erzyan independence and a figure of legend.

== Life ==
Purgaz was named in the Russian chronicles several times. In January 1229, his army repulsed a raid of the Russian princes Yaroslav Vsevolodovich, Vasily Konstantinovich and Vsevolod Konstantinovich. Purgaz then defeated the Mokshan prince Puresh. In April 1229, he tried to regain Nizhny Novgorod from the hands of the Russians, which was formerly the Erzyan settlement of Obran Osh. His troops burned down the settlement, but the citadel stayed safe. Several months later he was defeated by Puresh. During Purgaz's rule, Russian peasants fled to his principality.

In the summer of 1237, he successfully resisted the advance of the Mongols, he was defeated between the autumn of 1238 and the winter of 1239.

== Later perception ==
Since the 13th century, Purgaz had been idolized as a mythical hero; he started to be erroneously called a king of Mordovia. In the following centuries, Purgaz continued to be seen as an Erzyan hero.

== Sources ==
- Богуславский, Владимир Вольфович (2001). "Пургасова волость". Славянская энциклопедия: Киевская Русь-Московия. Т. 2: Н-Я (in Russian). ОЛМА Медиа Групп. p. 219. ISBN 978-5-224-02251-9.
