= Bambi Sheleg =

Israeli journalist

- במבי שלג
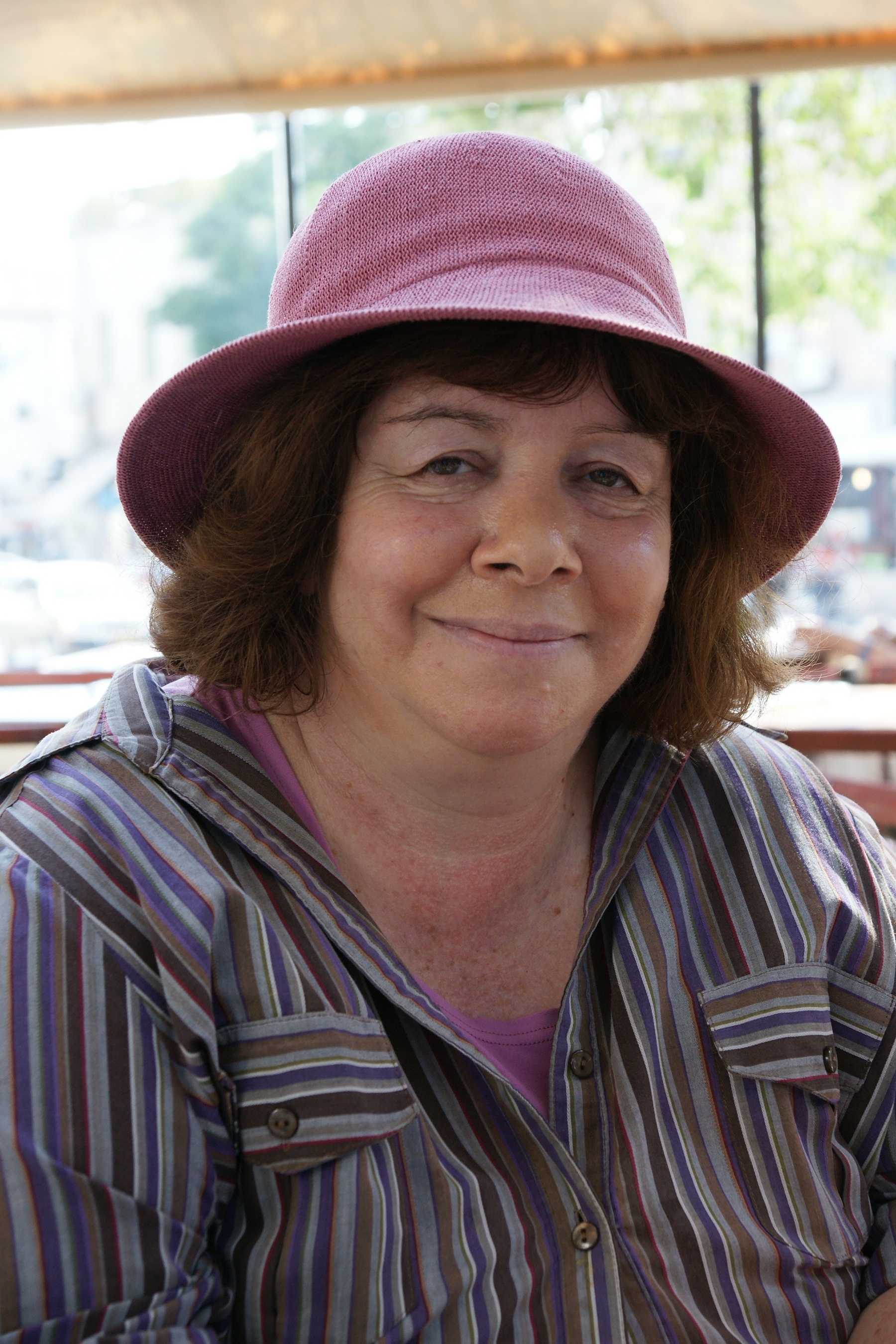
- Born: 1958; Chile
- Died: August 15, 2016 (aged 57 or 58); Jerusalem, Israel
- Citizenship: Chile; Israel
- Education: Hebrew University of Jerusalem; Shalom Hartman Institute
- Occupation: Journalist
- Awards: Liebhaber Prize for the Promotion of Religious Pluralism and Tolerance in Israel

Bambi Sheleg (Hebrew: במבי שלג; 1958 – 15 August 2016) was an Israeli journalist and founding editor of the magazine Eretz Acheret.

== Biography ==
Bambi Sheleg was born in Chile as Beatrice Ehrlich. She immigrated to Israel with her family at the age of 12. Sheleg graduated from the Hebrew University of Jerusalem with a BA in Jewish history and English literature, and studied Jewish philosophy at the Shalom Hartman Institute. She was married to Yair Sheleg, a journalist with the Israeli daily, Ha'aretz, and a researcher at the Israel Democracy Institute. She lived in Jerusalem with her husband and their three children. She died in Jerusalem on August 15, 2016, after a prolonged illness.

== Journalism career ==
Sheleg began her career as a reporter and associate editor for Nekuda, a journal of the settlers of the West Bank and Gaza. She then edited a children's magazine called Otiot (1987–1997). Bambi moved to the Israeli daily Maariv in 1996, where she continued to write a regular column. She frequently appeared as a guest commentator on television and radio talk shows, and lectures and participates in panel discussions throughout Israel. She was respected as a voice dedicated to promoting Israeli and Jewish discourse that places emphasis on issues of society and identity.

In September 2000, Sheleg founded Eretz Acheret ("A Different Israel"), a decision that was catalyzed by the assassination of Yitzhak Rabin. She decided that Israel needed a platform that would cut through ideological currents, in which an open ideological and ethical conversation would heal the rupture in society, and help the public to get a more precise picture of the challenges it faces. It publishes a magazine and website of the same name, which analyze social, cultural, and spiritual developments in Israel and among the Jewish people.

== Jewish outreach ==
She was an active member of the Bavli-Yerushalmi project, a Jerusalem-based study group for observant and non-observant Jews, which has a counterpart group in New York. The participants have been meeting for four-hour sessions every two weeks since 1997, for joint study of Jewish texts. Once a year, they get together with the New York group for a joint week-long seminar.

== Awards and recognition ==
In recognition of her efforts to build bridges between different communities in Israel, Bambi received the Liebhaber Prize for the Promotion of Religious Pluralism and Tolerance in Israel, awarded by the Masorti Movement of Israel in 1998.
