= Rast (Tümen Prince) =

Tümen Prince

- Prince
- Successor: Beibars-bik
- Buried: 1531; Kazan
- Noble family: Rasts
- Issue: Beibars-bik; Yanbars-murza; Kulaa-murza
- Occupation: Kazan Prince

Rast was a Tümen Prince of Moksha descent Founder of the Rast dynasty. Assassinated in May, 1531.

== Biography ==
Rast was a member of Eastern party and supporter of Khan Safa Giray. He was assassinated during the Moscow supported coup d'etat in May, 1531 when pro-Muscovy Shahghali was planned to be enthroned in Kazan

== Literature ==
- The Complete Collection of Russian Chronicles, vols. IX-XIV, editions of 1863, 1918, 2000. Nikonov chronicle

== See also ==
- Mokshas
- Tümen Princes
- Tümen Principality
