= Burtas =

Historical tribe of the Caspian Steppe

Burtas (Russian: Буртасы, Burtasy; Chuvash: Пăртассем, Părtassem; Tatar: Бортаслар, Bortaslar, بُرطاس) were a tribe of uncertain ethnolinguistic affiliation inhabiting the steppe region north of the Caspian Sea in medieval times (modern Penza Oblast, Ulyanovsk Oblast and Saratov Oblast of the Russian Federation). They were subject to the Khazars.

== History ==
In the 1380s or earlier at least part of them settled in Temnikov Principality. The Tatar-speaking Burtashi ethnic group is sometimes mentioned in forums.

== Ethnic Identity ==
The ethnic identity of the Burtas is disputed, with several different theories ranging from them being a Uralic tribal confederacy (probably later assimilated to Turkic language), and therefore perhaps the ancestors of the modern Moksha people.

Some scholars maintain that the Burtas are supposed to be Turkic-speaking and ethnically related to the Volga Bulgars.

Recently some scholars have suggested that the Burtas were Alans or another Iranian ethnolinguistic group. An Alanic (Sarmatian) origin would also explain their name as furt/fort ('big river' in Middle Iranian language or 'beehive' in Turkic language) and the Alanic endonym as.

Some Soviet and modern Russian historians such as A.E Alikhova and A.N.Gren connected the Burtas to the Chechens and noted that their neighbour Avars call them "Burti".

Nikolai Ashmarin believed that the word Mordas - i.e. Mordvins - comes from the ethnonym Burtas since they divide themselves into Erzya and Moksha. The transition took place through a linguistic transition typical for Bulgars (Ogurs) and Oguzes, where the typically Kypchak "M" turns into "B" and "P": the word "I am" (oguzes and ogurs) even in ancient times, they pronounced Bӓ(n), and kipchaks – Mӓn. Tat. men, chuv. pin, turk. bin - "thousand"; tat. milәsh, chuv. pilesh - "mountain ash"; tat. mәçә, chuv. pĕşi, pĕşuk - "cat"; tat. mich., chuv. pichev - "harness, harness", etc. In Tatar, even in Russian borrowings, instead of the initial sound "p" is "m": oven - pech > mich, barrel - bochka > michke. The Volga Bulgarian word "Burtas" passed through the Tatars to Mordas, then to Mordva, where the word bort < mord, as in the word Udmort (Udmurt) means a person, sanskrit: त्रिमूर्ति (tri mūrti) and as - a tribe. In the European part of Russia there are quite a lot of surnames "Mordasov" and "Burtasov", as well as the names of the settlements of Burtasy and Mordasy, Mordasovo.

== See also ==
- Temnikov Principality — Medieval Turkic and Finnic state

== Literature ==
- Brook, Kevin Alan (2006). The Jews of Khazaria (2nd ed.). Lanham, Maryland: Rowman & Littlefield. ISBN 0-7425-4981-X. OCLC 69332028.
- "Бортаслар". Tatar Encyclopaedia (in Tatar). Kazan: The Republic of Tatarstan Academy of Sciences. Institution of the Tatar Encyclopaedia. 2002.
