= Mordasovo =

Mordasovo Мордасово
- Village
- Location within Vladimir Oblast Location within Russia
- Coordinates: 55°55′N 40°37′E
- Country: Russia
- Region: Vladimir Oblast
- District: Sudogodsky District
- Time zone: UTC+3:00

Mordasovo (Russian: Мордасово) is a rural locality (a village) in Golovinskoye Rural Settlement, Sudogodsky District, Vladimir Oblast, Russia. The population was 6 as of 2010.

== Geography ==
Mordasovo is located on the Vysokusha River, 21 km west of Sudogda (the district's administrative centre) by road. Alexandrovo is the nearest rural locality.
