= Mokshas =

Finnic ethnic group

Moksha Alternative name: Mordvin-Moksha
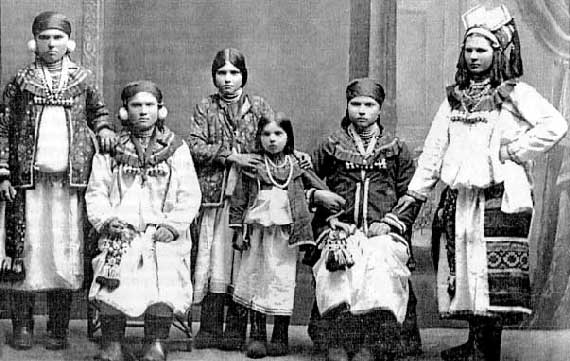
- Moksha women from Zubu. Photo by Ivan Dubasov, 19th century.

Total population
- ~ 19,869

Regions with significant populations
- Russia: Mordovia; Penza Oblast; Ryazan Oblast; Altai Krai; Tambov Oblast; Saratov Oblast; Orenburg Oblast; Tatarstan; Bashkortostan; Moscow Oblast: 11,801
- Estonia: ~ 368 (with Erzya)
- Kazakhstan: 8,013 (with Erzya)

Languages
- Moksha, Russian, Tatar

Religion
- Russian Orthodoxy, Lutheranism, Paganism

Related ethnic groups
- other Volga Finns, particularly Erzya

The Mokshas (also Mokshans, Moksha people; Moksha: Мокшет/Mokšet) comprise a Mordvinian ethnic group. Their language is Moksha, belonging to the Volgaic branch of the Uralic language family. They live in Russia, mostly near the Volga and Moksha rivers, a tributary of the Oka River.

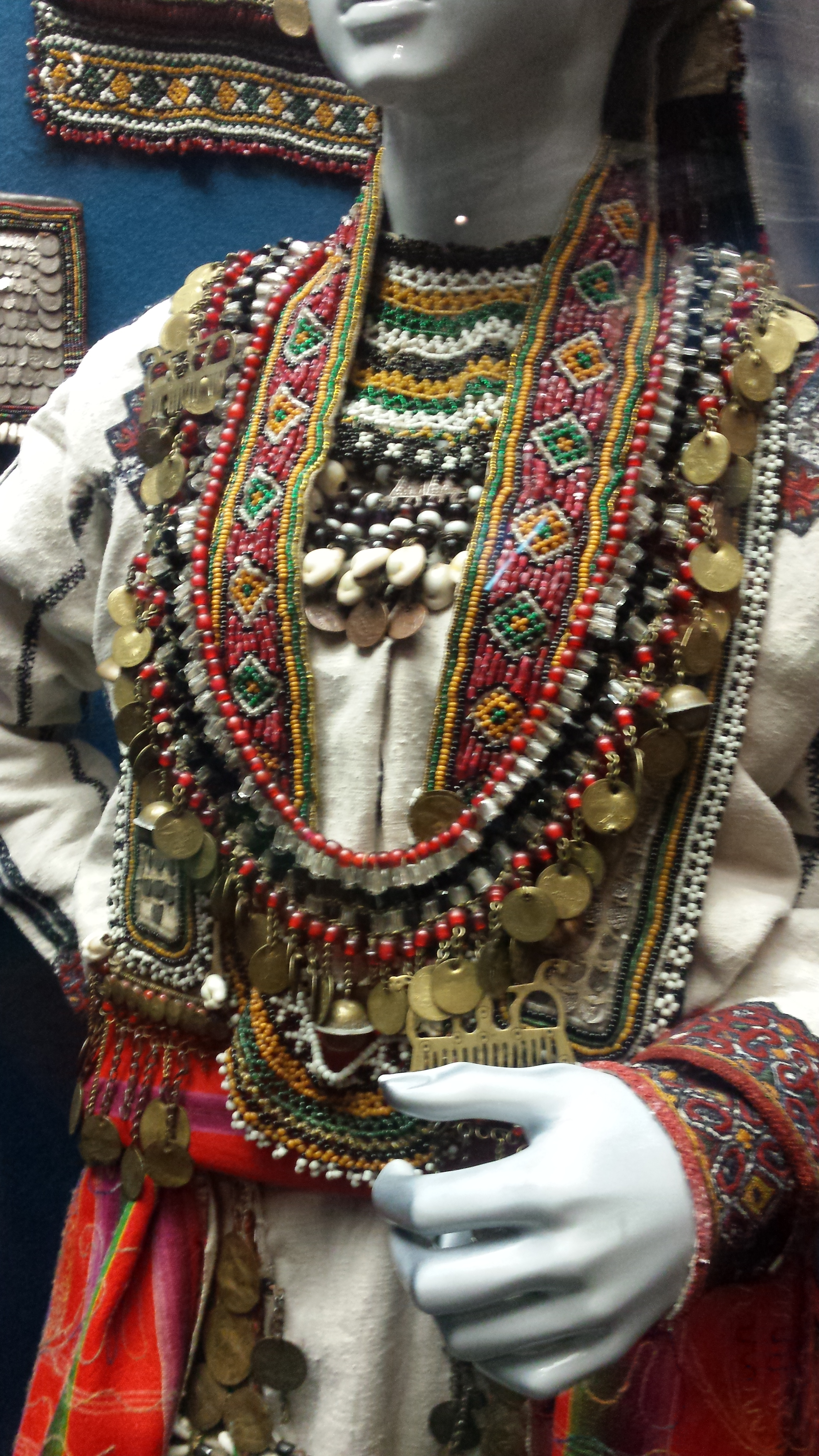
Outfit of the bride. Chest decorations. Mordvins-moksha, Tambov province, Temnikov uezd, XIX - beg.XX centuries

Their native language is Mokshan, one of the two surviving members of the Mordvinic branch of the Uralic language family. According to a 1994 Russian census, 49% of the autochthonal Finnic population in Mordovia identified themselves as Mokshas, totaling more than 180,000 people. Most Mokshas belong to the Russian Orthodox Church; other religions practised by Mokshas include Lutheranism and paganism.

== Name ==
Unofficial flag of the Moksha people.

The first written account of the ethnonym "Moksha" comes from the account of the friar William of Rubruck in the 13th century, who referred to them as Moxel. According to popular tradition, the Russians first used the term "Mordva" to refer only to the Erzya people, but later used it for both the Erzyas and the Mokshas. The term "Moksha" (Russian: мокша) begins to appear in Russian sources in the 17th century.

Local names for the Mokshas include:

- Мокшет (Mokšet) or Мокшень ломатть (Mokšeń lomatt́) ("Moksha people") in Moksha
- Мокшане (Mokshane) or Мордва-Мокша (Mordva-Moksha) in Russian
- Muqşılar in Tatar
- Мăкшăсем in Chuvash
- Мокшот (Mokšot) in Erzya

== History ==
=== Prehistory ===
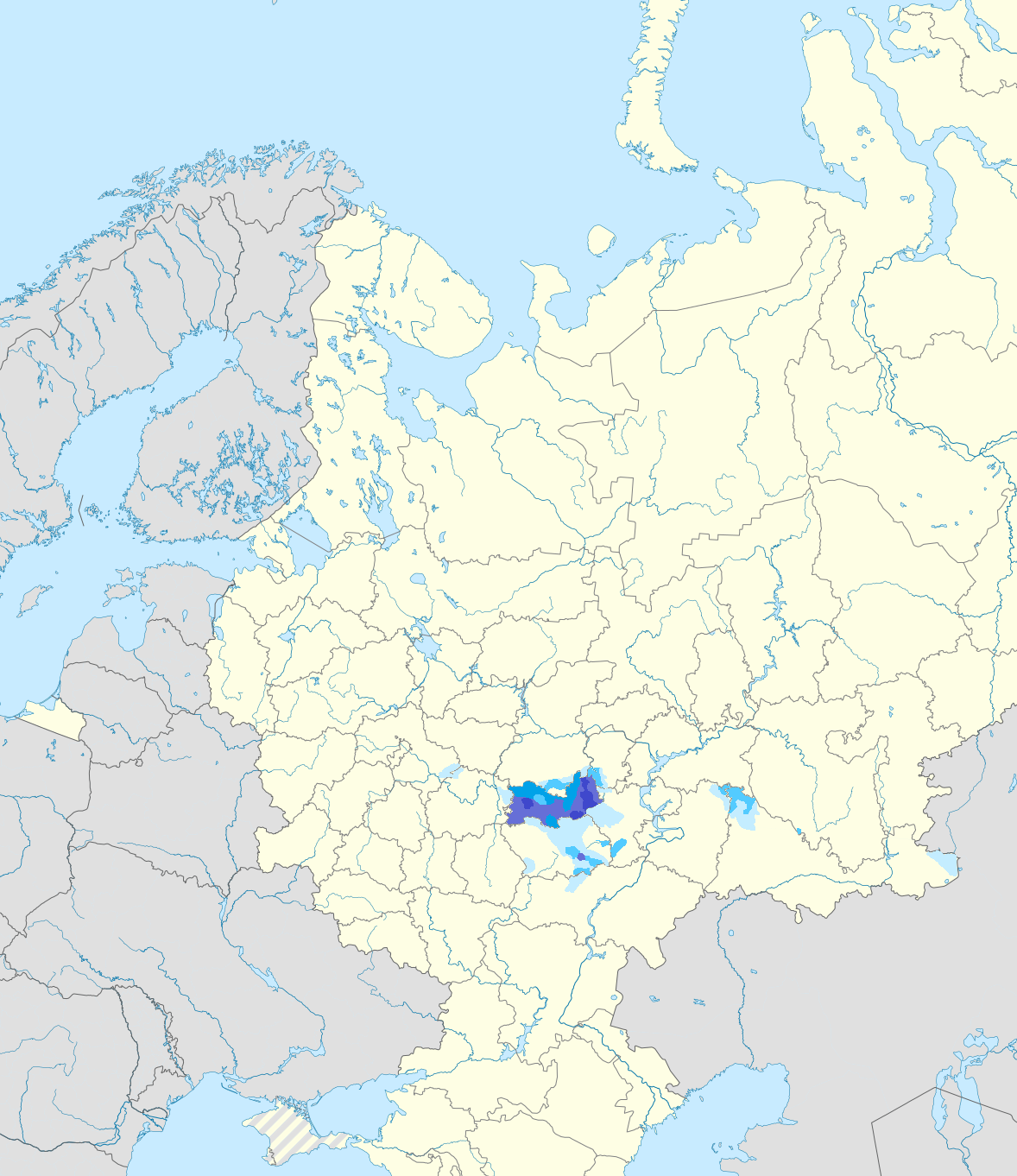
Mordovins in Russia

The breakup of the Volga Finns into separate groups is believed to have begun around 1200 BC. The Moksha people cannot be traced earlier because they did not possess a distinctive burial tradition before that time. According to archaeological data, bodies in early Mokshan burials were oriented with their heads to the south. Herodotus also describes the Scythian-Persian war of 516–512 BC, which involved the entire population of the Middle Volga. During this war the Sarmatians forced out the Scythians and subdued some Moksha clans. During the 2nd and 3rd centuries AD, Antes, Slavs, Mokshas and Erzyas became the most numerous and powerful population in East Europe. By the end of the 4th century, most Mokshas had joined the Hunnic tribal alliance, taken part in the defeat of the Ostrogothic Empire in 377, and subsequently moved eastward and settled in Pannonia. Evidence of the Hunnic connection includes Mokshan battle harnesses, especially the bits and psalia, which are identical to early Hunnic battle harnesses. Archaeological data show that the boundaries of Moksha territory did not change between the fourth and 8th centuries. In 450, the Mokshas were in alliance with a people of the Middle Volga known as the Burtas, who were possibly Alans.

=== Middle Ages ===
During the second Arab-Khazar War in 737, Arab armies under the command of Marwan ibn Muhammad reached the right bank of the Volga and came into conflict with the Burtas on their way to the left or "Khazar" bank of Volga. Circa 889–890, the Khazars were at war with the Burtas, the Oghuz and the Pechenegs. In 913, after a war between the Arsiyah and the Rus' at Atil began, five thousand Rus' survivors escaped up the Volga where most of them were killed by the Burtas. In 932, the Khazar King Aaron formed a war alliance with the Oghuz. Circa 940, during the reign of King Joseph, the Khazars entered into an alliance with the Burtas. Afterwards the Burtas Seliksa principality became a vassal of the Khazar khanate. In 965, Sviatoslav I of Kiev “attacked the Khazars' allies, captured Sarkel and Bulgaria, and reached Semender” according to Ibn Haukal. Two years later, after the Great Flood, he seized and destroyed Atil. At the beginning of the 10th century Almush (Almış) the king of Volga Bulgaria took control of the "Khazar tribute". He converted to Islam, formed an alliance with the caliph of Baghdad Al-Muktafi, and founded a trading post at the mouth of the Oka river. The Kievan prince Vladimir seized Bolghar in 985. King Almush and Prince Vladimir signed a peace and trade treaty in 1006 which was the beginning of an "eternal peace" that lasted for 80 years. War for domination of the Oka River and the Erzyan fortress Obran Osh started again in 1120. Prince Yury of the city of Vladimir seized Oshel in 1220 and demanded a reduction of Bulgarian influence over the Erzyan kingdom (Purgas Rus). The latter was allied with Volga Bulgaria. Vladimirian princes captured and destroyed Obran Osh in 1221 and founded Nizhny Novgorod on the site. The Erzyan King Purgaz and the Mokshan King Puresh were at war and while Purgaz was allied with Volga Bulgaria, Puresh was an ally of Prince Yury.^{:97–98} In 1230 Purgaz laid siege to Nizhny Novgorod but was defeated. After that Puresh's son Prince Atämaz with his Polovtsi allies raided into Purgaz's lands and completely destroyed his kingdom. As recorded by Rashid-al-Din in his Jami al-Tawarikh, 4 September 1236 was the date on which the sons of Jochi - Batu, Orda, and Berke, Ugedei's son Kadan, Chagatai's grandson Büri, and Genghis Khan's son Kulkan declared war on the Mokshas, Burtas and Erzyas. This war ended on 23 August 1237 with a crucial victory for the Mongols at the Black Forest close to the border of the Principality of Ryazan.

King Puresh of the Mokshans submitted to Batu Khan and was required personally to lead his army as a vassal in Mongol-Tartar military campaigns. At the beginning of 1241 the Mongol army seized Kiev, then invaded Poland. Roger Bacon in his Opus Majus writes that the Mokshas were in the vanguard of the Mongol army and took part in the capture of Lublin and Zawichost in Poland. Benedict Polone reports that the Mokshan army suffered serious losses during the capture of Sandomierz in February and Kraków in March of the same year. On 9 April 1241 the Mongol army defeated the allied Polish and German armies at the Battle of Legnica. It is believed King Puresh was slain in that battle. Shortly after that battle the Mokshan army declared to Batu that they refused to fight against Germans. According to reports by William Rubruck and Roger Bacon, the Mokshas had previously negotiated with the Germans and Bohemians regarding the possibility of joining their side in order to escape from their forced vassalage to Batu. It is known that Subutai ordered the punishment of the conspirators; thousands of Mokshas were put to death, but approximately a third escaped and returned to their homeland. Another third remained in the vanguard of the Mongol army and marched into Hungary through the Verecke Pass in March 1242, according to the Hungarian bishop Stephan II and Matthew of Paris. Following the deaths of King Puresh and Prince Atämaz at Legnica, Narchat, daughter of Puresh and sister of Atämaz, assumed rule of the Mokshan kingdom while her father was on campaign. After the Mongol punishment of the conspirators and the return of the surviving Mokshan warriors, Narchat led a final armed resistance against Batu Khan's forces in 1242. Defeated, she drowned herself in the Moksha River rather than submit to the Mongols. The Mokshan territories were subsequently incorporated as the Mukhsha Ulus within the Golden Horde. The Golden Horde established the city of Mukhsha (known today as Narovchat, Penza Oblast) in Mokshan lands as an administrative centre and one of the Golden Horde's regional minting cities, producing coins during the reigns of several khans from the late 13th to the 14th century.

== Geographic distribution ==
Mokshas live mostly in the central and western parts of the Republic of Mordovia, and neighbouring areas of Tambov Oblast and in the western and central parts of Penza Oblast. Populations of Mokshas also live in Orenburg Oblast, Bashkortostan, Tatarstan, Altai Krai, as well as in diaspora communities in Estonia, Kazakhstan, the United States, and Australia.

== Culture ==
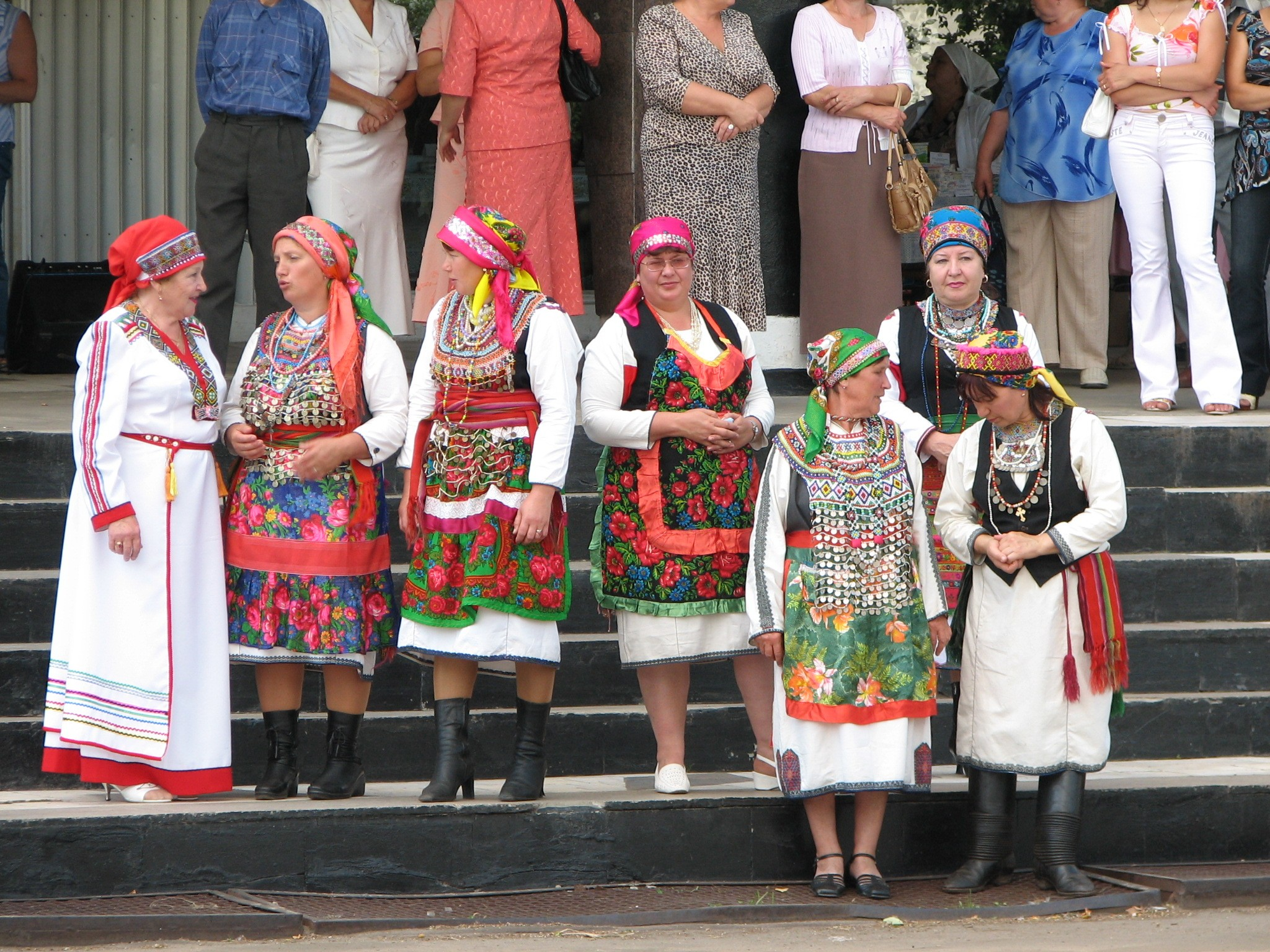
Moksha women in traditional clothes

=== Language ===
Mokshas speak the Moksha language, which is a member of the Mordvinic branch of the Uralic languages.

=== Mythology ===
In traditional Mokshan mythology the world was created by Ińe Narmon (Great Bird), referred to in folklore as Akša Loksti (White Swan). The first thing Ińe Narmon created was water. Yakśarga (Duck) brought sand from the bottom of the sea and Ińe Narmon took the sand and with it formed the earth with Ińe Šufta (The Great Tree) on it. Ińe Narmon made its nest on Ińe Šufta, which is usually referred to as Kelu (birch) in folklore. Akša Kal (White Sturgeon) carried the earth with the roots of Ińe Šufta on its back. Ińe Narmon had three nestlings: Tsofks (Nightingale), Kuku (Cuckoo), and Ožarga (Skylark). Tsofks chose bushes and willows for his home, Kuku settled in the forest, and Ožarga went to the meadows. Another of the old deities mentioned in Mokshan folklore was Mešavane (Mother Bee). Since the Christianization of the Mokshans the Mokshan Supreme God has usually been called Värden Škai (Supreme Creator).

According to later legends the creation of the world went through several stages: first the Idemevs (Devil) was asked by the God to bring sand from the bottom of the great sea. Idemevs hid some sand in his mouth. When Värden Škai started creating the earth, this hidden sand started to grow in the mouth of Idemevs. He had to spit it out and thus chasms and mountains appeared on the previously level and beautiful earth. The first humans created by Värden Škai could live for 700–800 years and were giants 99 arshins (yards) tall. The underworld in Mokshan mythology was ruled by Mastoratia. The souls of heroes, clan elders and warriors slain in battle travelled after death to the emerald green isle of Usiya, where they sat at a long table together with the great King Ťušťen drinking pure mead.

== Physical anthropology ==
The first to write about the anthropological characteristics of Moksha and Erzya was the German encyclopedist, naturalist and traveler in the Russian service Peter Simon Pallas (1773), according to whose observations there were fewer light-blond and red-haired Mokshas than Erzyans, however, the latter also had dark blond hair. In 1912, a course of lectures by Stephan Kuznetsov was published, which notes the anthropological characteristics of the Mokshans and Erzyans, which states that the Mokshans have a greater variety of anthropological types. Compared to the Erzyans, who have a greater predominance of fair-haired, gray-eyed and light-skinned individuals, the Mokshas have a predominant number of people with black hair and eyes, dark, yellowish skin color.

K.Yu. Mark distinguishes the Sub-Ural and North Pontic type among the Mokshans, and among the Erzyans — the Sura type, close to the Atlanto-Baltic anthropological type. Anthropologist Tatyana Ivanovna Alekseeva argued that in the Mokshans, compared to the Erzyans, the features of Southern Europeans are more noticeably manifested, and she attributes the Erzyans more to the circle of Northern Europeans. V.E. Deryabin noted that the Moksha people have an Eastern European base, modified by a Pontic anthropological component in combination with a slight Uraloid admixture. According to the publication of the Russian Academy of Sciences (2000) edited by Aleksandr Zubov, the Erzyans belong to the White Sea-Baltic version of the Caucasian race, which is represented, in addition to the Erzyans, by the majority of the Baltic Finnish-speaking peoples and part of the Komi-Zyryans. The Mokshas belong to the Ural race, within which the Mokshas are classified as the Sub-Ural subtype. The anthropological difference between the Erzyans and Mokshas, who are basically Caucasian race and subethnic groups of one of the most anthropologically homogeneous peoples, lies, in particular, in the fact that the Atlantic and North Pontic types are to some extent superimposed on the White Sea-Baltic basis of the Mordovians. The first type is represented predominantly among the Erzyans, the second — among the Mokshans, although both types are present in both categories of the population. Anthropologically, Moksha was formed as a result of the mixing of various types (White Sea, Pontic, East Baltic) of the Caucasian race.

== Genetic studies ==
As a result of O.P. Balanovsky singled out four main types of maps of genetic distances – "Eastern European", "North-Eastern", "North-Balkan", "South-Balkan", which included Slavic, Baltic, some Finno-Ugric and other peoples of Europe, however, maps of distances from Moksha do not belong to any of these types, which, according to the scientist, indicates the genetic identity of the Moksha people. The gene pool of the Finno-Ugric peoples itself has a high interpopulation diversity and a low intrapopulation diversity.^{:331}

For the analysis of mitochondrial DNA, data on the frequencies of 16 haplogroups were used – A, C, D, H, HV, I, J, K, T, U2, U3, U4, U5a, U5b, V, W. The analysis showed a significant difference in gene pools of Finno-Ugric populations (including the peoples of Moksha and Erzya) from the following gene pools of Europe – the population of the Russian North, Norwegians, Germans and other German-speaking peoples, as well as Irish, Slavs (other Russians, Belarusians, Ukrainians, Czechs, Slovaks, Poles, Slovenes and Bosnians), Balts, Hungarians and Swedes. All western and eastern Finnish-speaking peoples (except Estonians) – Finns, Karelians, Mari, Komi, Moksha and Erzya fell into separate clusters, being genetically distant from the entire European mitochondrial array, including northern Russian populations and other Slavs.^{; illustration 6.18}

The genetic landscape of the Mokshans according to the Y-chromosome haplogroups testifies to the great originality of their gene pool, since it covers a small area of the middle reaches of the Volga, limited to its right bank. The performed analysis of the Y-chromosome haplogroups indicates a significant genetic difference between Moksha not only from the gene pool of the Slavic and other neighboring peoples, but also from the Erzya gene pool, despite their close geographic location;^{; illustration 5.27} data on the frequencies of 15 Y-chromosome haplogroups showed that the Moksha and Erzya populations are not included in a single cluster.

Data of population geneticists of the Y-chromosome on the haplogroups of the Mokshans of the Staroshaigovsky district of Mordovia: R1a — 26,5%, J2 — nd (20,5%), N3 (TAT) — 16,9%, R1b — 13,3%, I1 — 12%, I2b — 4,8%, N2 (P43) — 2,4%, I2 — 2,4%, K*(M9) — 1,2%. Mitochondrial DNA by haplogroup: H — 41,5%, U5 — 18,9%, T — 7,6%, U2 — 5,7%, J — 5,7%, V — 5,7%, U4 — 3,8%, I — 3,8%, T1 — 1,9%, R — 1,9%, D — 1,9%, other — 1,9%.

When it comes to autosomal DNA, Mokshas show homogeneity with Erzyas. Like other Uralic-speaking populations, they carry a Nganasan-like Siberian component that accounts for about 11% of their admixture.

== Famous people of Moksha descent ==
- Rast, Prince, was a Tümen Prince of Moksha descent and Founder of the Rast dynasty
- Vasily Shukshin, Soviet writer, actor and film director
- Evgeny Chichvarkin, Russian businessman
- Alexander Ovechkin, Russian ice hockey player
- Oleg Maskaev, Russian boxer
- Mikhail Devyataev, Soviet fighter pilot, Hero of the Soviet Union

== See also ==
- Burtas
