= Moksha language =

Uralic language spoken in Russia

Moksha
- Mokshan
- мокшень кяль mokšəń käĺ
- Pronunciation: ['mɔkʃənʲ kælʲ]
- Native to: Russia
- Region: European Russia
- Ethnicity: 253,000 Mokshas (2010 census)
- Native speakers: 23,000 (2020 census)
- Language family: Uralic: Mordvinic; Moksha
- Writing system: Cyrillic

Official status
- Official language in: Mordovia (Russia)
- Regulated by: Mordovian Research Institute of Language, Literature, History and Economics

Language codes
- ISO 639-2: mdf
- ISO 639-3: mdf
- Glottolog: moks1248
- ELP: Moksha
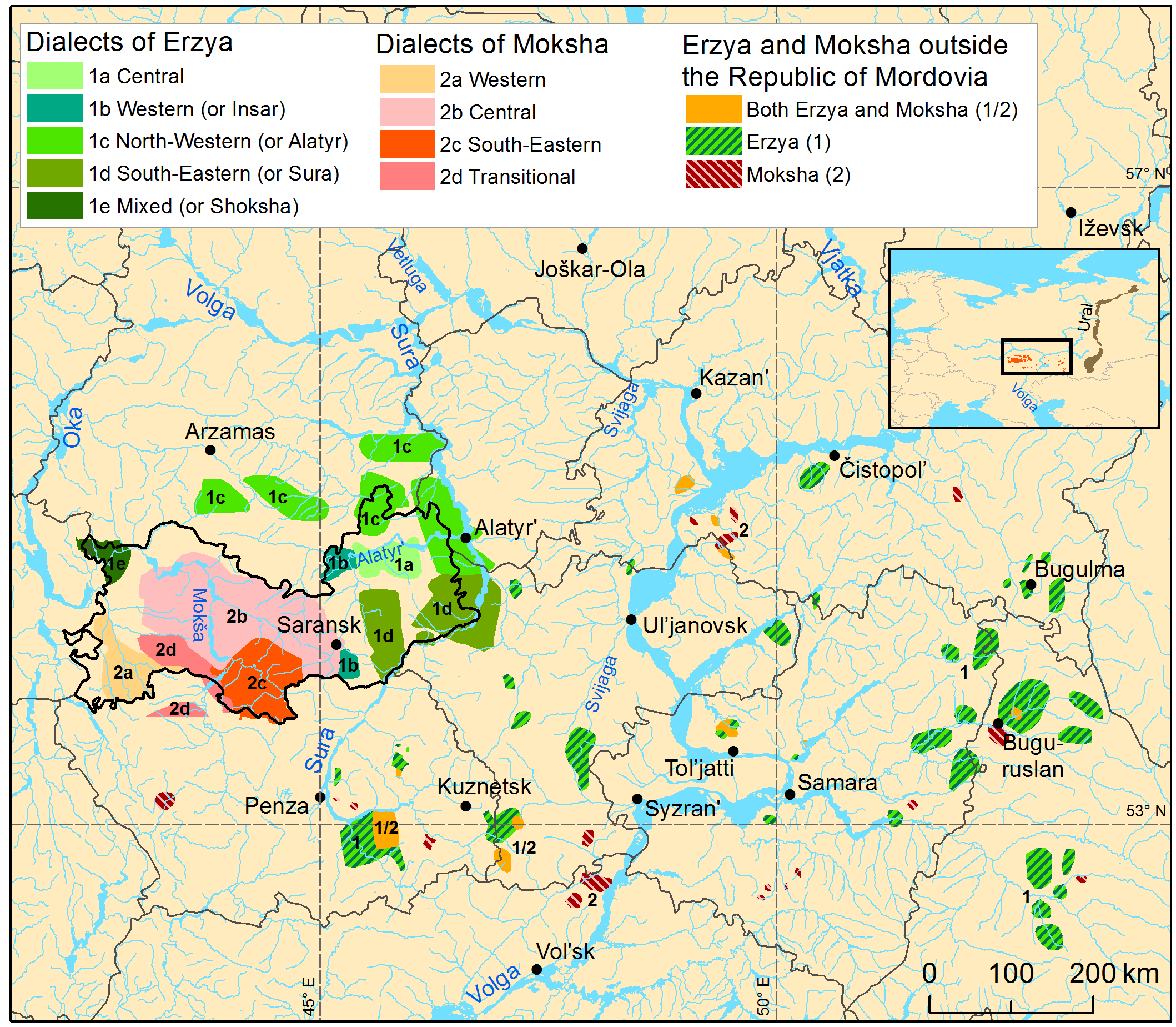
- Mordvin languages at the beginning of the 20th century

- Moksha is classified as Definitely Endangered by the UNESCO Atlas of the World's Languages in Danger.

Moksha (мокшень кяль, mokšəń käĺ, pronounced ['mɔkʃənʲ kælʲ]) is a Mordvinic language of the Uralic family, spoken by Mokshas, with around 130,000 native speakers in 2010. Moksha is the majority language in the western part of Mordovia. Its closest relative is the Erzya language, with which it is not mutually intelligible. Moksha is also possibly closely related to the extinct Meshcherian and Muromian languages.

== History ==
=== Cherapkin's Inscription ===
There is very little historical evidence of the use of Moksha from the distant past. One notable exception are inscriptions on so-called mordovka silver coins issued under Golden Horde rulers around the 14th century. The evidence of usage of the language (written with the Cyrillic script) comes from the 16th century.

МОЛИ АНСИ ОКАНП ЄЛКИ
moli ansi okan pelki
Моли аньцек окань пяли
Goes only for half gold

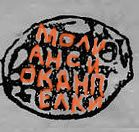
Zaikovskiy's picture of the mordovka type A

=== Indo-Iranian Influence ===
Indo-Iranian forms
D–V
Indo-Iranian form	Declining stem	Meaning	Moksha derivatives
داس	Persian: dâs	"sickle"	тарваз /'tɑrvɑs/ "sickle"
𐬠𐬀𐬖𐬀	Avestan: baγa	"God"	паваз /'pɑvɑs/ "God"
ऊधर्	Sanskrit: ū́dhar	"udder"	одар /'odɑr/ "udder"
वज्र	Sanskrit: vajra	"God's weapon"	узерь /'uzʲərʲ/ "axe"

== Dialects ==
Moksha

The Moksha language is divided into three dialects:

- Central group (M-I)
- Western group (M-II)
- South-Eastern group (M-III)

The dialects may be divided with another principle depending on their vowel system:

- ä-dialect: Proto-Moksha *ä /æ/ is retained: śeĺmä /sʲelʲmæ/ "eye", t́äĺmä /tʲælʲmæ/ "broom", ĺäj /lʲæj/ "river".
- e-dialect: Proto-Moksha *ä is raised and merged with *e: śeĺme /sʲelʲme/ "eye", t́eĺme /tʲelʲme/ "broom", ĺej /lʲej/ "river". The South-Eastern group belongs to the e-dialect
- i-dialect: Proto-Moksha *ä is raised to /e/, while Proto-Moksha *e is raised to /i/ and merged with *i: śiĺme /sʲilʲme/ "eye", t́eĺme /tʲelʲme/ "broom", ĺej /lʲej/ "river".

The standard literary Moksha language is based on the central group with ä (particularly the dialect of Krasnoslobodsk).

== Sociolinguistics ==
=== Official status ===
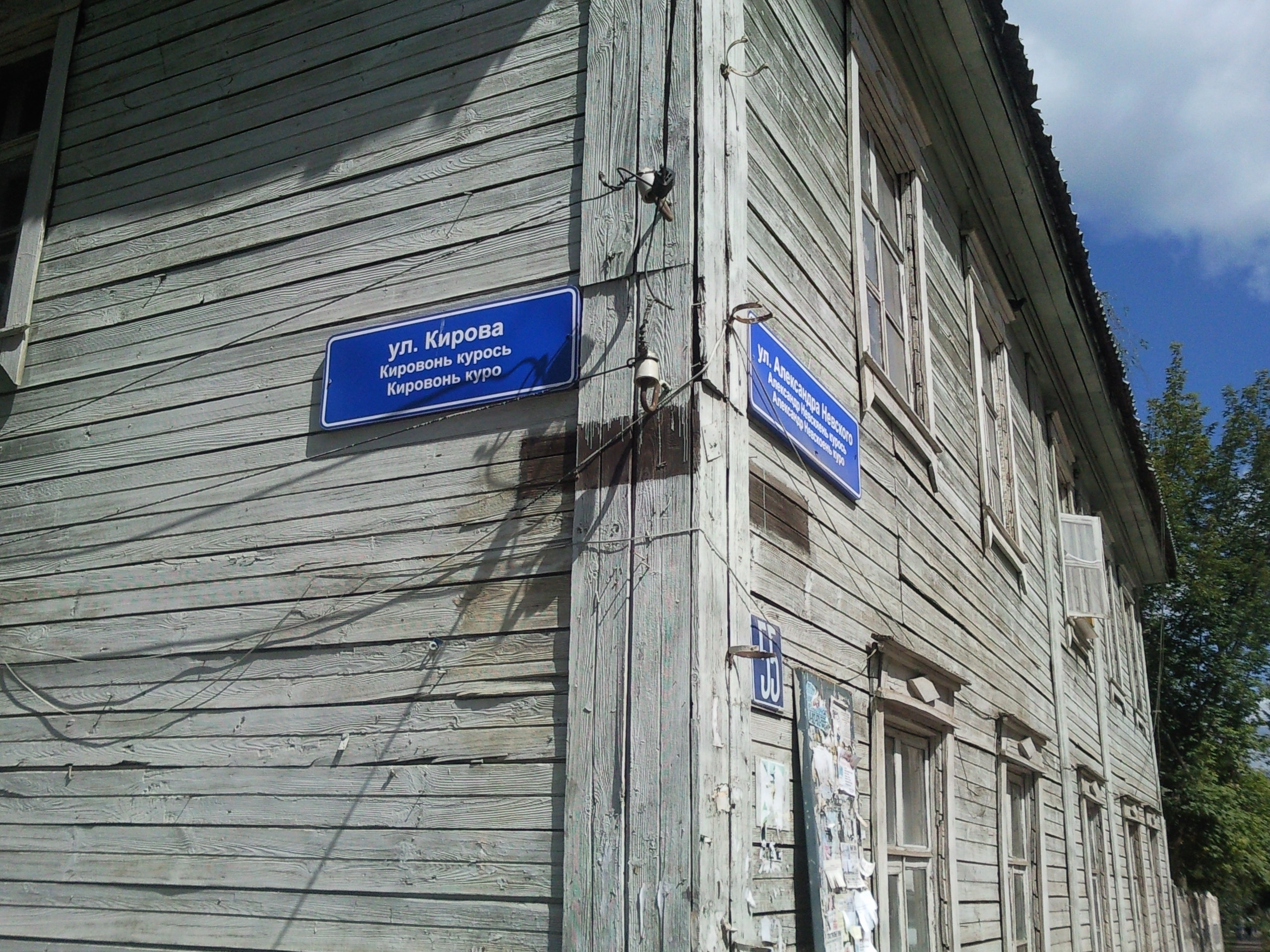
A trilingual street sign in Saransk, Russia showing a street name in Russian, Moksha and Erzya

Moksha is one of the three official languages in Mordovia (the others being Erzya and Russian). The right to one's own language is guaranteed by the Constitution of the Mordovia Republic. The republican law of Mordovia N 19-3 issued in 1998 declares Moksha one of its state languages and regulates its usage in various spheres: in state bodies such as Mordovian Parliament, official documents and seals, education, mass-media, information about goods, geographical names, road signs. However, the actual usage of Moksha and Erzya is rather limited.

=== Revitalisation efforts in Mordovia ===
Policies regarding the revival of the Moksha and Erzya languages in Mordovia started in the late 1990s, when the Language, and Education Laws were accepted. From the early 2000s on, the policy goal has been to create a unified Mordvin standard language despite differences between Erzya and Moksha.

However, there have been no executive programmes for the implementation of the Language Law. Only about a third of Mordvin students had access to Mordvin language learning, the rest of whom are educated through Russian. Moksha has been used as the medium of instruction in some rural schools, but the number of students attending those schools is in rapid decline. In 2004, Mordovian authorities attempted to introduce compulsory study of the Mordvin/Moksha as one of the Republic's official languages, but this attempt failed in the aftermath of the 2007 education reform in Russia.

== Phonology ==
=== Vowels ===
There are eight vowels with limited allophony and reduction of unstressed vowels. Moksha has lost the original Uralic system of vowel harmony but maintains consonant-vowel harmony (palatalized consonants go with front vowels, non-palatalized with non-front).

	Front	Central	Back
Close	i ⟨и⟩	ɨ ⟨ы⟩	u ⟨у, ю⟩
Mid	e ⟨е, э⟩	ə ⟨а, о, е⟩	o ⟨о⟩
Open	æ ⟨я, э, е⟩		ɑ ⟨а⟩

There are some restrictions for the occurrence of vowels within a word:

1. [ɨ] is an allophone of the phoneme /i/ after phonemically non-palatalized ("hard") consonants.
2. /e/ does not occur after non-palatalized consonants, only after their palatalized ("soft") counterparts.
3. /a/ and /æ/ do not fully contrast after phonemically palatalized or non-palatalized consonants.
  - Similar to /e/, /æ/ does not occur after non-palatalized consonants either, only after their palatalized counterparts.
  - After palatalized consonants, /æ/ occurs at the end of words, and when followed by another palatalized consonant.
  - /a/ after palatalized consonants occurs only before non-palatalized consonants, i.e. in the environment /CʲaC/.
4. The mid vowels' occurrence varies by the position within the word:
  - In native words, /e, o/ are rare in the second syllable, but common in borrowings from e.g. Russian.
  - /e, o/ are never found in the third and following syllables, where only /ə/ occurs.
  - /e/ at the end of words is only found in one-syllable words (e.g. ве /ve/ "night", пе /pe/ "end"). In longer words, word-final ⟨е⟩ always stands for /æ/ (e.g. веле /velʲæ/ "village", пильге /pilʲɡæ/ "foot, leg").

Unstressed /ɑ/ and /æ/ are slightly reduced and shortened [ɑ̆] and [æ̆] respectively.

=== Consonants ===
There are 33 consonants in Moksha.

	Labial		Alveolar				Post- alveolar		Palatal		Velar	
	Labial		plain		palat.		Post- alveolar		Palatal		Velar	
Nasal		m ⟨м⟩		n ⟨н⟩		nʲ ⟨нь⟩						
Stop	p ⟨п⟩	b ⟨б⟩	t ⟨т⟩	d ⟨д⟩	tʲ ⟨ть⟩	dʲ ⟨дь⟩					k ⟨к⟩	ɡ ⟨г⟩
Affricate			ts ⟨ц⟩		tsʲ ⟨ць⟩		tɕ ⟨ч⟩					
Fricative	f ⟨ф⟩	v ⟨в⟩	s ⟨с⟩	z ⟨з⟩	sʲ ⟨сь⟩	zʲ ⟨зь⟩	ʂ~ʃ ⟨ш⟩	ʐ~ʒ ⟨ж⟩	ç ⟨йх⟩		x ⟨х⟩	
Approximant			l̥ ⟨лх⟩	l ⟨л⟩	l̥ʲ ⟨льх⟩	lʲ ⟨ль⟩				j ⟨й⟩		
Trill			r̥ ⟨рх⟩	r ⟨р⟩	r̥ʲ ⟨рьх⟩	rʲ ⟨рь⟩						

/ç/ is realized as a sibilant [ɕ] before the plural suffix /-t⁽ʲ⁾/ in south-east dialects.

Palatalization, characteristic of Uralic languages, is contrastive only for dental consonants, which can be either "soft" or " hard". In Moksha Cyrillic alphabet the palatalization is designated like in Russian: either by a "soft sign" ⟨ь⟩ after a "soft" consonant or by writing "soft" vowels ⟨е, ё, и, ю, я⟩ after a "soft" consonant. In scientific transliteration the acute accent or apostrophe are used.

All other consonants have palatalized allophones before the front vowels /æ, i, e/ as well. The alveolo-palatal affricate /tɕ/ lacks non-palatalized counterpart, while postalveolar fricatives /ʂ~ʃ, ʐ~ʒ/ lack palatalized counterparts.

==== Devoicing ====
Unusually for a Uralic language, there is also a series of voiceless liquid consonants: /l̥ , l̥ʲ, r̥ , r̥ʲ/ ⟨ʀ, ʀ́, ʟ, ʟ́⟩. These have arisen from Proto-Mordvinic consonant clusters of a sonorant followed by a voiceless stop or affricate: *p, *t, *tʲ, *ts⁽ʲ⁾, *k.

Before certain inflectional and derivational endings, devoicing continues to exist as a phonological process in Moksha. This affects all other voiced consonants as well, including the nasal consonants and semivowels. No voiceless nasals are however found in Moksha: the devoicing of nasals produces voiceless oral stops. Altogether the following devoicing processes apply:

Plain	b	m	d	n	dʲ	nʲ	ɡ	l	lʲ	r	rʲ	v	z	zʲ	ʒ	j
Devoiced	p		t		tʲ		k	l̥	l̥ʲ	r̥	r̥ʲ	f	s	sʲ	ʃ	ç

For example, before the nominative plural /-t⁽ʲ⁾/:

- кал /kal/ "fish" – калхт /kal̥t/ "fish"
- лем /lʲem/ "name" – лепть /lʲeptʲ/ "names"
- марь /marʲ/ "apple" – марьхть /mar̥ʲtʲ/ "apples"

Devoicing is, however, morphological rather than phonological, due to the loss of earlier voiceless stops from some consonant clusters, and due to the creation of new consonant clusters of voiced liquid + voiceless stop. Compare the following oppositions:

- калне /kalnʲæ/ "little fish" – калхне /kal̥nʲæ/ (< *kal-tʲ-nʲæ) "these fish"
- марьне /marʲnʲæ/ "my apples" – марьхне /mar̥ʲnʲæ/ ( < *marʲ-tʲ-nʲæ) "these apples"
- кундайне /kunˈdajnʲæ/ "I caught it" – кундайхне /kunˈdaçnʲæ/ ( < *kunˈdaj-tʲ-nʲæ) "these catchers"

=== Stress ===
Non-high vowels are inherently longer than high vowels /i, u, ə/ and tend to draw the stress. If a high vowel appears in the first syllable which follow the syllable with non-high vowels (especially /a/ and /æ/), then the stress moves to that second or third syllable. If all the vowels of a word are either non-high or high, then the stress falls on the first syllable.

Stressed vowels are longer than unstressed ones in the same position like in Russian. Unstressed vowels undergo some degree of vowel reduction.

== Writing systems ==
Moksha Cyrillic alphabet 1924–1927

Moksha has been written using Cyrillic with spelling rules identical to those of Russian since the 18th century. As a consequence of that, the vowels /e, ɛ, ə/ are not differentiated in a straightforward way. However, they can be (more or less) predicted from Moksha phonotactics. The 1993 spelling reform defines that /ə/ in the first (either stressed or unstressed) syllable must be written with the "hard" sign ⟨ъ⟩ (e.g. мъ́рдсемс mə́rdśəms "to return", formerly мрдсемс). The version of the Moksha Cyrillic alphabet used in 1924-1927 had several extra letters, either digraphs or single letters with diacritics. Although the use of the Latin script for Moksha was officially approved by the CIK VCKNA (General Executive Committee of the All Union New Alphabet Central Committee) on June 25, 1932, it was never implemented.

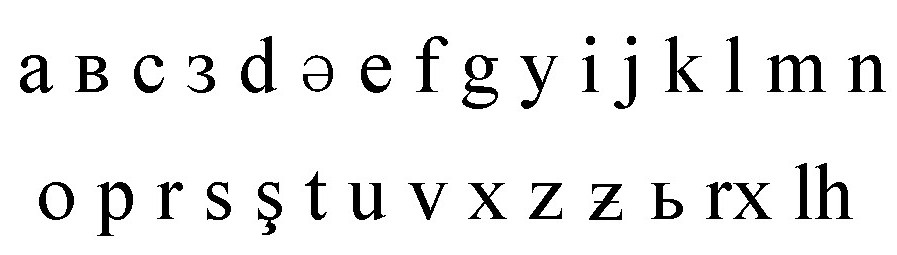
Moksha Latin alphabet 1932

From letters to sounds
Cyr	Аа	Бб	Вв	Гг	Дд	Ее				Ёё		Жж	Зз	Ии	Йй	Кк	Лл	Мм	Нн	Оо	
IPA	a	b	v	ɡ	d	ʲe,	je,	ʲɛ,	ʲə	ʲo,	jo	ʒ	z	i	j	k	l	m	n	o,	ə
ScTr	a	b	v	g	d	ˊe,	je,	ˊä,	ˊə	ˊo,	jo	ž	z	i	j	k	l	m	n	o,	ə
Cyr	Пп	Рр	Сс	Тт	Уу	Фф	Хх	Цц	Чч	Шш	Щщ	Ъъ	Ыы	Ьь	Ээ		Юю		Яя		
IPA	p	r	s	t	u	f	x	ts	tɕ	ʃ	ɕtɕ	ə	ɨ	ʲ	e,	ɛ	ʲu,	ju	ʲa,	æ,	ja
ScTr	p	r	s	t	u	f	χ	c	č	š	šč	ə	i͔	ˊ	e,	ä	ˊu,	ju	ˊa,	ˊä,	ja

From sounds to letters
IPA	a	ʲa	ja	ɛ	ʲɛ		b	v	ɡ	d	dʲ	e	ʲe	je	ʲə	ʲo	jo	ʒ	z	zʲ	i	ɨ	j	k	l	lʲ	l̥	l̥ʲ
Cyr	а	я	я	э	я,	е	б	в	г	д	дь	э	е	е	е	ё	ё	ж	з	зь	и	ы	й	к	л	ль	лх	льх
ScTr	a	ˊa	ja	ä	ˊä		b	v	g	d	d́	e	ˊe	je	ˊə	ˊo	jo	ž	z	ź	i	i͔	j	k	l	ľ	ʟ	ʟ́
IPA	m	n	o	p	r	rʲ	r̥	r̥ʲ	s	sʲ	t	tʲ	u	ʲu	ju	f	x	ts	tsʲ	tɕ	ʃ	ɕtɕ	ə					
Cyr	м	н	о	п	р	рь	рх	рьх	с	сь	т	ть	у	ю	ю	ф	х	ц	ць	ч	ш	щ	о,	ъ,*	a,*	и*		
ScTr	m	n	o	p	r	ŕ	ʀ	ʀ́	s	ś	t	t́	u	ˊu	ju	f	χ	c	ć	č	š	šč	ə					

== Grammar ==
=== Morphosyntax ===
Like other Uralic languages, Moksha is an agglutinating language with elaborate systems of case-marking and conjugation, postpositions, no grammatical gender, and no articles.

==== Case ====
Moksha has 13 productive cases, many of which are primarily locative cases. Locative cases in Moksha express ideas that Indo-European languages such as English normally code by prepositions (in, at, towards, on, etc.).

However, also similarly to Indo-European prepositions, many of the uses of locative cases convey ideas other than simple motion or location. These include such expressions of time (e.g. on the table/Monday, in Europe/a few hours, by the river/the end of the summer, etc. ), purpose (to China/keep things simple), or beneficiary relations. Some of the functions of Moksha cases are listed below:

- Nominative, used for subjects, predicatives and for other grammatical functions.
- Genitive, used to code possession.
- Allative, used to express the motion onto a point.
- Elative, used to code motion out of a place.
- Inessive, used to code a stationary state, in a place.
- Ablative, used to code motion away from a point or a point of origin.
- Illative, used to code motion into a place.
- Translative, used to express a change into a state.
- Prolative, used to express the idea of "by way" or "via" an action or instrument.
- Lative, used to code motion towards a place.

There is controversy about the status of the three remaining cases in Moksha. Some researchers see the following three cases as borderline derivational affixes.

- Comparative, used to express a likeness to something.
- Caritive (or abessive), used to code the absence of something.
- Causal, used to express that an entity is the cause of something else.

Case function	Case Name	Suffix	Vowel stem		Plain consonant stem		Palatalized consonant stem	
Case function	Case Name	Suffix	[ˈmodɑ]	land	[kut]	house	[velʲ]	town
Grammatical	Nominative	-Ø	[ˈmodɑ]	a land	[kud]	a house	[ˈvelʲæ]	a town
Grammatical	Genitive	[nʲ]	[ˈmodɑnʲ]	of a land, a land's	[ˈkudʲənʲ]	of a house, a house's	[ˈvelʲənʲ]	of a town, a town's
Locative	Allative	[nʲdʲi]	[ˈmodɑnʲdʲi]	onto a land	[ˈkudənʲdʲi]	onto a house	[ˈvelʲənʲdʲi]	onto a town
Locative	Elative	[stɑ]	[ˈmodɑstɑ]	out of a land	[kutˈstɑ]	out of a house	[ˈvelʲəstɑ]	out of a town
Locative	Inessive	[sɑ]	[ˈmodɑsɑ]	in a land	[kutˈsɑ]	in a house	[ˈvelʲəsɑ]	in a town
Locative	Ablative	[dɑ, tɑ]	[ˈmodɑdɑ]	from a land	[kutˈtɑ]	from the house	[ˈvelʲədɑ]	from the town
Locative	Illative	[s]	[ˈmodɑs]	into a land	[kuts]	into a house	[ˈvelʲəs]	into a town
Locative	Prolative	[vɑ, ɡɑ]	[ˈmodɑvɑ]	through/alongside a land	[kudˈɡɑ]	through/alongside a house	[ˈvelʲəvɑ]	through/alongside a town
Locative	Lative	[v, u, i]	[ˈmodɑv]	towards a land	[ˈkudu]	towards a house	[ˈvelʲi]	towards a town
Other	Translative	[ks]	[ˈmodɑks]	becoming/as a land	[ˈkudəks]	becoming/as a house	[ˈvelʲəks]	becoming a town, as a town
Other	Comparative	[ʃkɑ]	[ˈmodɑʃkɑ]	size of a land, land size	[kudəʃˈkɑ]	size of a house, house size	[ˈvelʲəʃkɑ]	size of a town, town size
Other	Caritive	[ftəmɑ]	[ˈmodɑftəmɑ]	without a land, landless	[kutftəˈmɑ]	without a house, houseless	[ˈvelʲəftəma]	without a town, townless
Other	Causal	[ŋksɑ]	[ˈmodɑŋksɑ]	because of a land	[kudəŋkˈsɑ]	because of a house	[ˈvelʲəŋksɑ]	because of a town

===== Relationships between locative cases =====
As in other Uralic languages, locative cases in Moksha can be classified according to three criteria: the spatial position (interior, surface, or exterior), the motion status (stationary or moving), and within the latter, the direction of the movement (approaching or departing). The table below shows these relationships schematically:

Schematic Summary of Locative Cases
Spatial Position	Motion Status		
Spatial Position	Stationary	Moving	
Spatial Position	Stationary	Approaching	Departing
Interior	inessive (in) [-sɑ]	illative (into) [-s]	elative (out of) [stɑ]
Surface	N/A	allative (onto) [nʲdʲi]	ablative (from) [dɑ, tɑ]
Exterior	prolative (by) [vɑ, gɑ]	lative (towards) [v, u, i]	N/A

==== Pronouns ====
Personal pronouns
Case	Singular			Plural		
Case	First	Second	Third	First	Second	Third
nominative	[mon]	[ton]	[son]	[minʲ]	[tʲinʲ]	[sʲinʲ]
genitive	[monʲ]	[tonʲ]	[sonʲ]	[minʲ]	[tʲinʲ]	[sʲinʲ]
allative	[monʲdʲəjnʲæ, tʲejnæ]	[ˈtonʲdʲəjtʲ, tʲəjtʲ]	[ˈsonʲdʲəjzɑ, ˈtʲejnzɑ]	[minʲdʲəjnʲek]	[tinʲdʲəjnʲtʲ]	[sʲinʲdʲəst]
ablative	[ˈmonʲdʲədən]	[ˈtonʲdʲədət]	[ˈsonʲdʲədənzɑ]	[minʲdʲənk]	[minʲdʲədent]	[sʲinʲdʲədəst]

== Common expressions ==
Moksha	Romanization	English
Да	Da	Yes
Пара	Pára	Good
Стане	Stáne	Right
Аф	Af	Not
Аш	Aš	No
Шумбра́т!	Šumbrát!	Hello! (addressing one person)
Шумбра́тада!	Šumbrátada!	Hello! (addressing more than one person)
Сюкпря!	Sjuk prjá!	Thanks! (lit.: Bow)
Ульхть шумбра́!	Ulht šumbrá!	Bless you!
У́леда шумбра́т!	Úleda šumbrát!	Bless you (to many)!
Ванфтт пря́цень!	Vanft prjátsen	Take care!
Ванфтк пря́цень!	Vanftk prjátsen!	Be careful!
Ко́да э́рят?	Kóda érjat?	How do you do?
Ко́да те́фне?	Kóda téfne?	How are your things getting on?
Лац!	Lac!	Fine!
Це́бярьста!	Cébjarsta!	Great!
Ня́емозонк!	Njájemozonk!	Good bye! (lit.: See you later)
Ва́ндыс!	Vándis!	See you tomorrow!
Шумбра́ста па́чкодемс!	Šumbrásta páčkodems!	Have a good trip/flight!
Па́ра а́зан: ле́здоманкса!; се́мбонкса!	Pára ázan: lézdomanksa!; sémbonksa!	Thank you: for help/assistance!; for everything!
Аш ме́зенкса!	Aš mézenksa!	Not at all!
Про́стямак!	Prо́stjamak!	I'm sorry!
Про́стямасть!	Prо́stjamast!	I'm sorry (to many)!
Тят кяжия́кшне!	Tját kjažijákšne!	I didn't mean to hurt you!
Ужя́ль!	Užjál!	It's a pity!
Ко́да тонь ле́мце?	Kóda ton lémce?	What is your name?
Монь ле́мозе ...	Mon lémoze ...	My name is ...
Мъзя́ра тейть ки́зa?	Mzjára téjt kíza?	How old are you?
Мъзя́ра те́йнза ки́за?	Mzjára téinza kíza?	How old is he (she)?
Те́йне ... ки́зот.	Téjne ... kízot.	I'm ... years old.
Те́йнза ... ки́зот.	Téjnza ... kízot.	He (she) is ... years old.
Мя́рьгат сува́мс?	Mjárgat suváms?	May I come in?
Мя́рьгат о́замс?	Mjárgat о́zams?	May I have a seat?
О́зак.	Ózak.	Take a seat.
О́зада.	Ózada.	Take a seat (to many).
Учт аф ла́мос.	Učt af lámos.	Please wait a little.
Мярьк та́ргамс?	Mjárk tárgams?	May I have a smoke?
Та́ргак.	Tárgak.	[You may] smoke.
Та́ргада.	Tárgada.	[You may] smoke (to many).
Аф, э́няльдян, тят та́рга.	Af, énjaldjan, tját tárga.	Please, don't smoke.
Ко́рхтак аф ла́мода ся́да ка́йгиста (сяда валомня).	Kórtak af lámoda sjáda kájgista (sjáda valо́mne).	Please speak a bit louder (lower).
Азк ни́нге весть.	Azk nínge vest.	Repeat one more time.
Га́йфтть те́йне.	Gájft téjne.	Call me.
Га́йфтеда те́йне.	Gájfteda téjne.	Call me (to many).
Га́йфтть те́йне ся́да ме́ле.	Gájft téjne sjáda méle.	Call me later.
Сува́к.	Suvák.	Come in.
Сува́да.	Suváda.	Come in (to many).
Ётак.	Jо́tak.	Enter.
Ётада.	Jо́tada.	Enter (to many).
Ша́чема ши́цень ма́рхта!	Šáčema šícen márhta!	Happy Birthday!
А́рьсян тейть па́ваз!	Ársjan téjt pávaz!	I wish you happiness!
А́рьсян тейть о́цю сатфкст!	Ársjan téjt ótsju satfkst!	I wish you great success!
Тонь шумбраши́цень и́нкса!	Ton šumbrašícen ínksa!	Your health!
О́чижи ма́рхта	Óčiži márhta!	Happy Easter!
Од Ки́за ма́рхта!	Od Kíza márhta!	Happy New Year!
Ро́штува ма́рхта!	Róštuva márhta!	Happy Christmas!
То́ньге ста́не!	Tónge stáne!	Same to you!

== Media ==
=== Use in literature ===
Before 1917 about 100 books and pamphlets mostly of religious character were published. More than 200 manuscripts including at least 50 wordlists were not printed. In the 19th century the Russian Orthodox Missionary Society in Kazan published Moksha primers and elementary textbooks of the Russian language for the Mokshas. Among them were two fascicles with samples of Moksha folk poetry. The great native scholar Makar Evsevyev collected Moksha folk songs published in one volume in 1897. Early in the Soviet period, social and political literature predominated among published works. Printing of Moksha language books was all done in Moscow until the establishment of the Mordvinian national district in 1928. Official conferences in 1928 and 1935 decreed the northwest dialect to be the basis for the literary language.

=== Use in education ===
The first few Moksha schools were established in the 19th century by Russian Christian missionaries. Since 1973, Moksha has been allowed to be used as the language of instruction for the first three grades of elementary school in rural areas, and as an elective subject. Classes in universities in Mordovia are in Russian, but the philological faculties of Mordovian State University and Mordovian State Pedagogical Institute offer a teacher course of Moksha. Mordovian State University also offers a course in Moksha for other humanitarian and some technical specialities. According to annual statistics from the Russian Ministry of Education for 2014-2015, there were 48 Moksha-medium schools (all in rural areas) where 644 students were taught, and 202 schools (152 in rural areas) where Moksha was studied as a subject by 15,783 students (5,412 in rural areas). Since 2010, the study of Moksha in Mordovian schools is not compulsory, but can be chosen only by parents.

== Bibliography ==
- Aasmäe, Niina; Lippus, Pärtel; Pajusalu, Karl; Salveste, Nele; Zirnask, Tatjana; Viitso, Tiit-Rein (2013). Moksha prosody. Suomalais-Ugrilaisen Seuran toimituksia. Helsinki: Suomalais-Ugrilainen Seura. ISBN 978-952-5667-47-9.
- Feoktistov, Aleksandr; Saarinen, Sirkka (2005). Mokšamordvan murteet [Dialects of Moksha Mordvin]. Suomalais-Ugrilaisen Seuran toimituksia (in Finnish). Helsinki: Suomalais-Ugrilainen Seura. ISBN 952-5150-86-0.
- Juhász, Jenő (1961). Moksa-Mordvin szójegyzék (in Hungarian). Budapest.
- Paasonen, Heikki (1990–1999). Kahla, Martti (ed.). Mordwinisches Wörterbuch. Helsinki.
- Raun, Alo (1988). "The Mordvin Language". In Sinor, Denis (ed.). The Uralic Languages: Description, History and Foreign Influences. BRILL. pp. 96–110. ISBN 90-04-07741-3.
- Kuznetsov, Stefan (1912), Russkaya istoricheskaya geografiya. Mordva (in Russian), Book on Demand Ltd, ISBN 5-518-06684-8
- Belyakov, Andrey (2013-03-12), Invisible Men in Russian Army in 16th century. Russian Army During the Reign of Ivan the Terrible. Materials of Academic Discussion Dedicated To 455th Anniversary of Beginning of the Livonian War. Part I. Is.2 (in Russian), Saint-Petersburg
- Fedorov-Davydov G.A.; Tsirkin A.V. (1966), Novye dannye ob Ityakovskom gorodishche v Temnikovskom r-ne Mordovskoy ASSR [New Data on the Ityakovskoe Settlement in the Temnikov District of the Mordovian ASSR]. Issledovaniya po arkheologii i etnografii Mordovskoy ASSR: Trudy Mordovskogo IYaLIE [Studies in Archaeology and Ethnography of the Mordovian ASSR: Proceedings of the Mordovian Scientific-Research Institute of Language, Literature and History] Is. 30 (in Russian), Saransk
- Filjushkin, Alexander (2008). Ivan the Terrible: A Military History. Frontline Books. ISBN 978-1-84832-504-3.
- Geraklitov, Aleksandr (2011). Selected Works. Vol. 1. Mordovsky belyak (in Russian). Mordovia Republic Humanities Research Institute. ISBN 978-5-900029-78-8.
- Zaikovsky, Bogdan (1929), Back To Mordovkas' Problem (in Russian), Saratov: Nizhne-Volzhskaya Oblast scientific and historical society review
- Serebrenikov, B.A.; Feoktistov, A.P.; Polyakov, O.Y., eds. (1998) [First published 1998]. Moksha-Russian Dictionary (in Russian). Digora. ISBN 5-200-02012-3.
- Semenkovich, Vladimir (1913). Geloni and Mordva: Historical Geography Of Upper Don And Oka Materials and Research (in Russian). Yeltsin President Library.
- Orbelli, Iosif (1982). Folklore And Traditions of Moks (in Russian). Nauka.
- Popov, M.M. (2005), Seliksa Mordvas (PDF) (in Russian), Saransk: Republic of Mordovia Government Research Institute of Humanities
- Akhmetyanov, Rifkat (1981). Common Spiritual Culture Vocabulary Of Middle Volga Peoples (in Russian). Nauka.
- Setälä, Eemil; Smirnov, Ivan (1898). East Finns. Ivan Smirnov's Historical And Ethnographical Essays (in Russian). Sankt Peterburg: Yeltsin President Library.
- Melnikov, Pavel (1879). In The Mountains (in Russian).
- Stetsyuk, Valentin (2022). "Ancient Greeks And Italics In Ukraine And Russia".
- Fyodorova, Marina (1976). Slavs, Mordvins And Antes (in Russian). Voronezhg: Voronezh University Publishing.
- Palchan Israel (2018). The Khazar story: The Tail of Two Languages: Russian Hebrew and the Khazar story. ISBN 978-978-965-908-1.
- Belinsky, Vladimir (2007). Moxel Country (in Russian). Smolensk: Posokh. ISBN 978-966-7601-91-1.
- Mierow, Charles Christopher, ed. (1915), The Gothic History of Jordanes, Princeton, Univ. Press
- Minorsky, Vladimir (1952), The Alān Capital *Magas and the Mongol Campaign, Cambridge University Press, JSTOR 608675
- Minorsky, Vladimir; al-ʿĀlam, Ḥudūd (1952), Ḥudūd al-ʿĀlam. The regions of the world: a Persian geography, 372 A.H./982 A.D para 52. The Alān Capital *Magas and the Mongol Campaign, Cambridge University Press
- Fournet, Arnaud (2008), Le vocabulaire Mordve de Witsen. Une forme ancienne du dialecte Zubu-Mokša. Études finno-ougriennes, tome 40
- Beekes, R.S.P.; Beek, L.V. (2010). Etymological Dictionary of Greek. Vols. 1 & 2.

In Russian

- Аитов Г. Новый алфавит – великая революция на Востоке. К межрайонным и краевой конференции по вопросам нового алфавита. — Саратов: Нижневолжское краевое издательство, 1932.
- Ермушкин Г. И. Ареальные исследования по восточным финно-угорским языкам = Areal research in East Fenno-Ugric languages. — М., 1984.
- Поляков О. Е. Учимся говорить по-мокшански. — Саранск: Мордовское книжное издательство, 1995.
- Феоктистов А. П. Мордовские языки // Языки народов СССР. — Т.3: Финно-угроские и самодийские языки — М., 1966. — С. 172–220.
- Феоктистов А. П. Мордовские языки // Основы финно-угорского языкознания. — М., 1975. — С. 248–345.
- Феоктистов А. П. Мордовские языки // Языки мира: уральские языки. — М., 1993. — С. 174–208.
- Cherapkin, Iosif (1933). Moksha-Mordvin - Russian Dictionary. Саранск.
- Vershinin, Valery (2009). Mordvinic (Erzya and Moksha languages) Etymological Dictionary (in Russian). Vol. 4. Yoshkar Ola.
- Vershinin, Valery (2005). Mordvinic (Erzya and Moksha languages) Etymological Dictionary (in Russian). Vol. 3. Yoshkar Ola.

In Moksha

- Девяткина, Татьяна (2002). Мокшэрзянь мифологиясь [Tatyana Devyatkina. Moksha-Erzya mythology] (in Moksha). Tartu: University of Tartu. ISBN 9985-867-24-6.
- Alyoshkin A. (1988). "Siyan Karks [Silver Belt]". Moksha (in Moksha). 6.
