= Mukhsha Ulus =

Mukhsha Ulus (Tatar: Мухша олысы, موحشا ﯘلىسى, romanized: Muxşa olısı), existed from the 13th to 15th centuries with its capital in Mukhsha. The bulk of its territory was situated between the rivers Sura and Tsna.

In 1360, Tağay Beg conquered the ulus and it became a semi-independent duchy. In 1367, Mamai conquered that duchy.
