= Miniskirt =

Short skirt that usually extends to mid-thigh

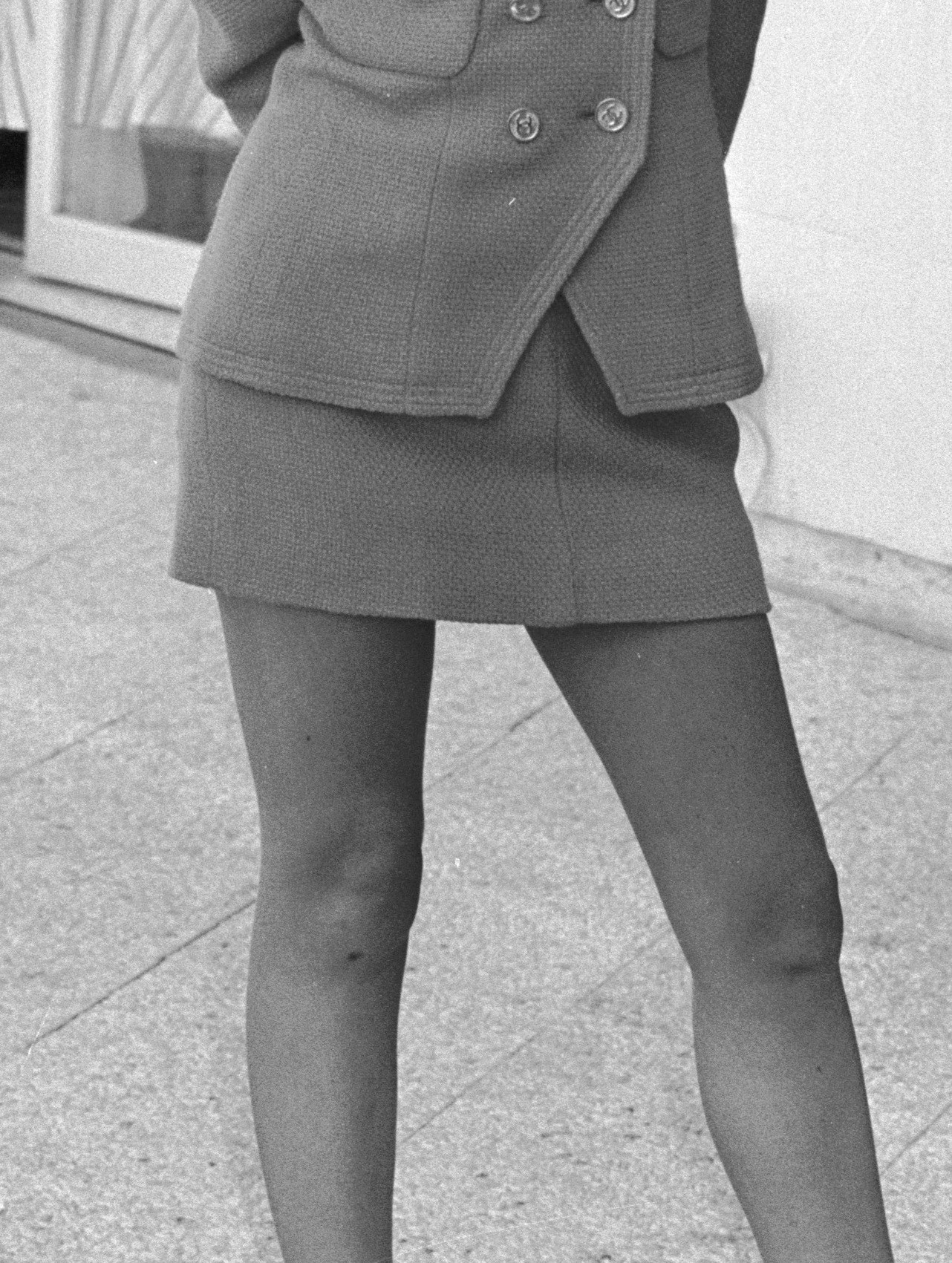
- Miniskirt worn by Patsy Kensit
- Designer: Mary Quant
- Year: mid to late 1960s
- Type: Clothing worn around the waist and above the knees, generally at mid-thigh level
- Material: fabric

A miniskirt (or mini-skirt, mini skirt, or mini) is a skirt with its hemline well above the knees, generally at mid-thigh level, normally no longer than 10 cm (4 in) below the buttocks; and a dress with such a hemline is called a minidress or a miniskirt dress. A micro-miniskirt or microskirt is a miniskirt with its hemline at the upper thigh, at or just below crotch or underwear level.

Short skirts had existed for a long time before entering mainstream fashion, though they were generally not called "mini" until they became a fashion trend in the 1960s. Instances of clothing resembling miniskirts have been identified by archaeologists and historians as far back as c. 1390–1370 BC. In the early 20th century, the banana skirt worn by the dancer Josephine Baker for her mid-1920s performances in the Folies Bergère was subsequently likened to a miniskirt. Extremely short skirts became a staple of 20th-century science fiction, particularly in 1940s pulp artwork, such as that by Earle K. Bergey, who depicted futuristic women in a "stereotyped combination" of metallic miniskirt, bra and boots.

Hemlines were just above the knee in 1961, and gradually climbed upward over the next few years. By 1966, some designs had the hem at the upper thigh. Stockings with suspenders (garters) were not considered practical with miniskirts and were replaced with coloured tights. The popular acceptance of miniskirts peaked in the "Swinging London" of the 1960s, and has continued to be commonplace, particularly among younger women and teenage girls. Before that time, short skirts were only seen in sport and dance clothing, such as skirts worn by female tennis players, figure skaters, cheerleaders, and dancers.

Several designers have been credited with the invention of the miniskirt, most significantly the London-based designer Mary Quant and the Parisian André Courrèges.

== Early history ==
=== In China ===
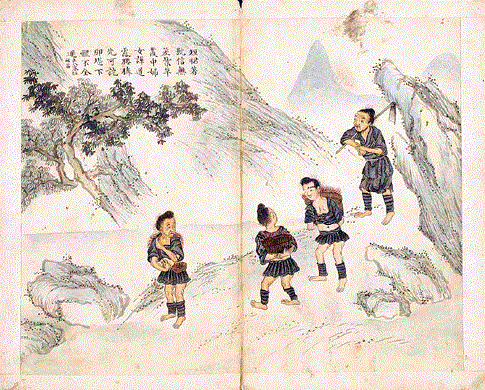
Duanqun Miao women, Qing dynasty China. University of Calgary collection.

In the Warring States period of China, men could wear short skirts similar to a kilt. In the Qin dynasty, the first imperial dynasty of China, some short skirts worn by men were short enough to reach the mid-thighs as observed in the Terracotta army of Qin Shihuang. Han Chinese women also wore short outer skirts, such as the yaoqun (Chinese: 腰裙) and the weichang (Chinese: 围裳); however, they had to be worn over a long skirt. One of the earliest known cultures where women regularly wore clothing resembling miniskirts was a subgroup of the Miao people of China, the duanqun Miao (Chinese: 短裙苗; pinyin: duǎnqún miáo; lit. 'short skirt Miao'). In albums produced during the Qing dynasty (1644–1912) from the early eighteenth century onward to illustrate the various types of Miao, the duanqun Miao women were depicted wearing "mini skirts that barely cover the buttocks." At least one of the "One Hundred Miao Pictures" albums contains a poem that specifically describes how the women's short skirts and navel-baring styles were an identifier for this particular group.

=== In Europe and America ===
Figurines produced by the Vinča culture (c. 5700–4500 BC) have been interpreted by archaeologists as representing women in miniskirt-like garments. One of the oldest surviving garments resembling a miniskirt is short and woolen with bronze ornaments. It was worn by the Egtved Girl for her burial in the Nordic Bronze Age (c. 1390–1370 BCE).

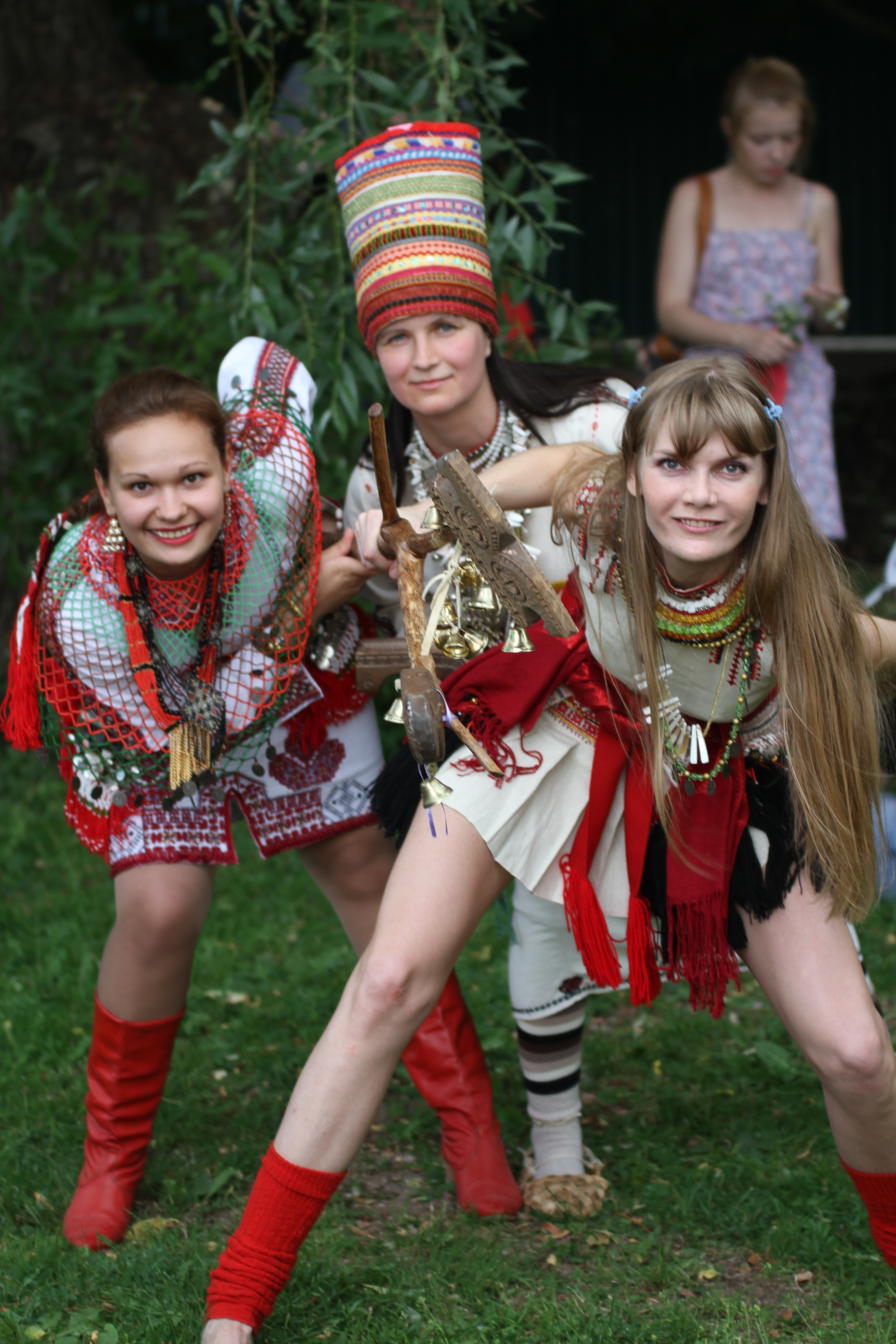
Female members of modern Erzyan folk band Oyme wearing costumes similar to ones described by Melnikov-Pechersky

Russian writer Pavel Melnikov-Pechersky has noted numerous times in his ethnographic works about the 19th century Mordvin (Erzya and Moksha) people that their culture valued the beauty of female legs, and Mordvin women could wear short ponyovas (a kind of traditional skirt).

In 1922, skirts were shortened and could now reach the mid-shin rather than just the ankle. The banana skirt worn by the dancer Josephine Baker for her mid-1920s performances in the Folies Bergère was subsequently likened to a miniskirt. Prior to being censored in 1934, cartoon character Betty Boop also wore a short skirt. The first knee-length skirts for everyday wear emerged in the mid-1920s, largely inspired by Chanel, but they still covered the knee. Above-the-knee skirts were not part of women's wardrobes at this time, despite film depictions from decades later portraying women as wearing them in the late 1920s. In the 20th century until the mid-1960s, women did not generally wear skirts above the knee. They were commonly taught to keep their knees covered, seat themselves in ways that kept the legs together, or maintain other postures to avoid being viewed as sexually promiscuous. During the 1950s, even the skirts of cheerleaders and many ballerinas fell to the calf. Exceptions included stage performers or showgirls like Josephine Baker, athletes, and competitive dancers. Nevertheless, miniskirts were beginning to emerge by the early 1960s. For leisure activities in the late 1950s, young women occasionally wore kilt-looking skirts as short as the lower thigh, referred to as skating skirts, cycling skirts, or Bermuda skirts, which might accompany tights for more coverage. Beach cover-up dresses might also be this length, with some beach dresses in the earliest sixties already looking like the mini-shift dresses that would become mainstream streetwear in just a few years. In the rarefied world of fifties high fashion, though, the rare designer who presented skirts that revealed the knee, as Yves Saint Laurent did at Dior in 1959, might be greeted with outrage. Leg-revealing skirts were seen in science fiction, however. Two notable examples that showed miniskirts were the science fiction films Flight to Mars (1951) and Forbidden Planet (1956).

==== Mid-20th century science fiction ====
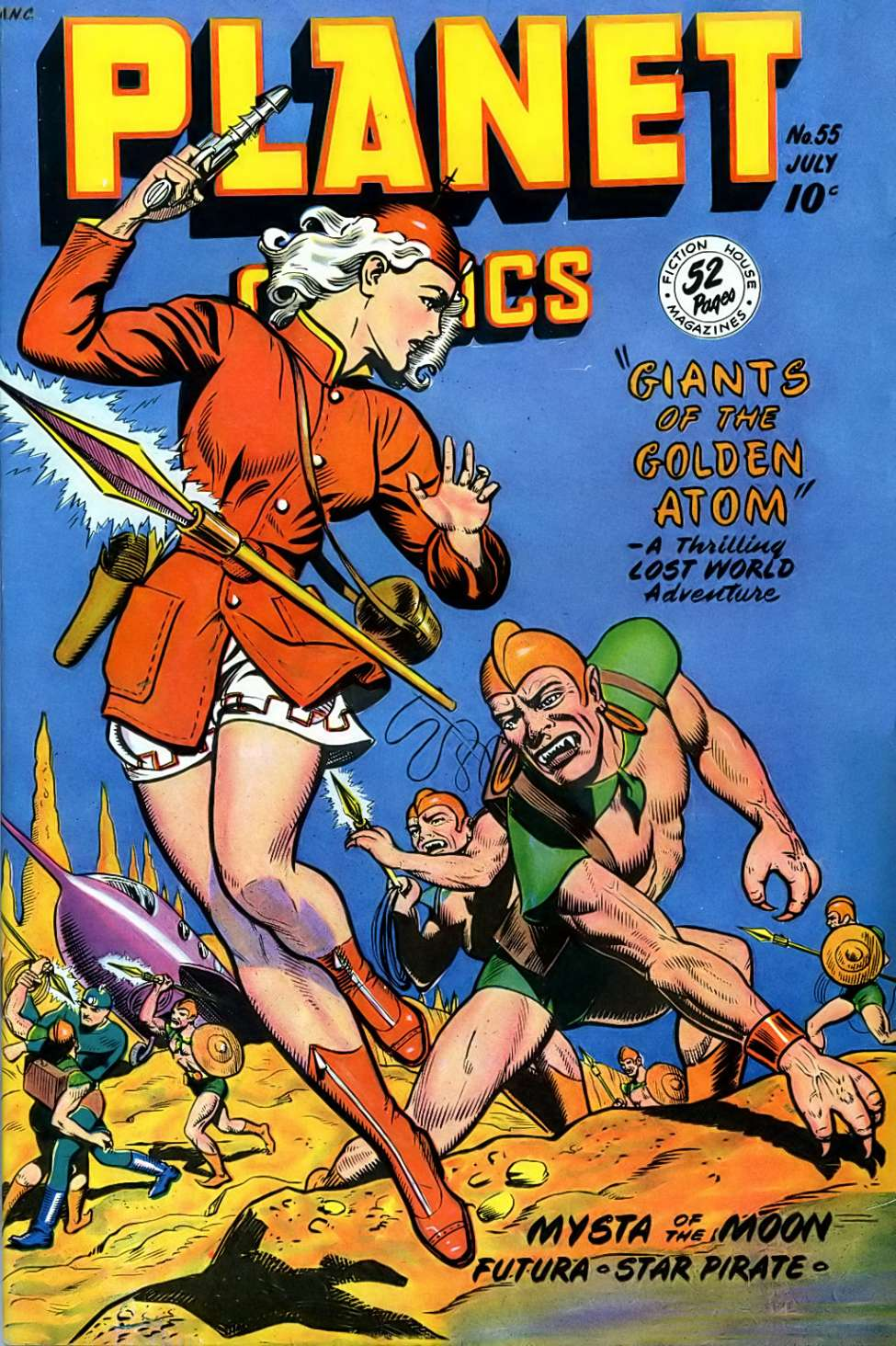
July 1948 Planet Comics cover featuring a combination of metallic-color miniskirt and boots

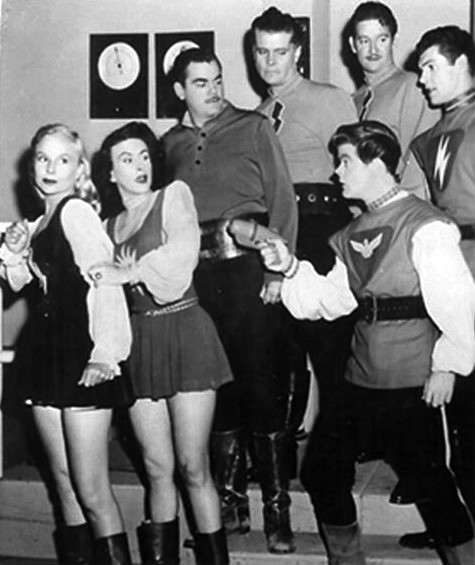
The Space Patrol cast

Extremely short skirts became a staple of 20th-century science fiction, particularly in 1940s pulp artwork such as that by Earle K. Bergey, who depicted futuristic women in a "stereotyped combination" of metallic miniskirt, bra and boots. The "sci-fi miniskirt" was seen in genre films and television programmes as well as on comic book covers. The very short skirts worn by regular female characters Carol and Tonga (played by Virginia Hewitt and Nina Bara) in the 1950–55 television series Space Patrol are considered as probably the first 'micro-minis' to have been seen on American television. Only one formal complaint relating to the skirts has been known, by an advertisement agency regarding an upwards shot of Carol climbing a ladder. Hewitt pointed out that even though the complainant claimed they could see up her skirt, her matching tights rendered her effectively clothed from neck to ankle. Otherwise, Space Patrol was applauded for being wholesome and family-friendly, even though the women's short skirts would have been unacceptable in other contexts. Although the 30th-century women in Space Patrol were empowered, experts in their field, and largely treated as equals, "it was the skirts that fuelled indelible memories." The Space Patrol skirts were not the shortest to be broadcast at the time. The German-made American 1954 series Flash Gordon showed Dale Arden (played by Irene Champlin) in an even shorter skirt.

== 1960s ==
The manager of an unnamed shop in London's Oxford Street began experimenting in 1960 with skirt hemlines an inch above the knees on window mannequins and noted how positively his customers responded. In August 1961, Life published a photograph of two Seattle students at the University of Hawaiʻi wearing above-the-knee garments called "kookie-muus", an abbreviated version of the traditionally concealing muumuu, and noted a "current teen-age fad for short skirts" that was pushing hemlines well above the knee. The article also showed young fashionable girls in San Francisco wearing hemlines "just above the kneecap" and students at Vanderbilt University wearing "knee ticklers" ending three inches above their knee when playing golf. The caption commented that such short skirts were selling well in the South and that "some Atlanta girls" were cutting old skirts to "thigh high" lengths.

Skirts three or four inches above the knee were spotted during the Spring 1962 Paris couture showings, prompting a soundly negative response from American Vogue. This pre-dates the famous above-the-knee skirts shown by André Courrèges in 1964, normally said to be the first such skirts shown by the couture, but it's unclear whether the 1962 skirts were seen on the runway or on the streets. Extremely short skirts, some as much as eight inches above the knee, were observed in Britain in the summer of 1962. The young women who wore these short skirts were called "Ya-Ya girls", a term derived from "yeah, yeah" which was a popular catcall at the time. One retailer noted that the fashion for layered net crinoline petticoats raised the hems of short skirts even higher. The earliest known reference to the miniskirt is in a humorous 1962 article datelined Mexico City and describing the "mini-skirt" or "Ya-Ya" as a controversial item of clothing that was the latest thing on the production line there. The article characterised the miniskirt as stopping eight inches above the knee. It referred to a writing by a psychiatrist, whose name it did not provide, who had argued that the miniskirt was a youthful protest of international threats to peace. Much of the article described the reactions of men, who were said to favour the fashion on young women to whom they were unrelated, but to oppose it on their own wives and fiancées.

Only a very few people, including an avant-garde in the UK, wore such lengths in the beginning years of the decade. The standard hemline for public and designer garments in the early sixties was mid-knee, just covering the knee. It would gradually climb upward over the next few years, fully baring the knees of mainstream models in 1964, when both André Courrèges and Mary Quant showed above-the-knee lengths, followed shortly thereafter by Rudi Gernreich and Jacques Tiffeau in the US. The following year, skirts continued to rise as British miniskirts were officially introduced to the US in a New York show whose models' thigh-high skirts stopped traffic. By 1966, many designs had the hem at the upper thigh. Towards the end of the 1960s, an even shorter version of the miniskirt, called the microskirt or micro-mini, emerged.

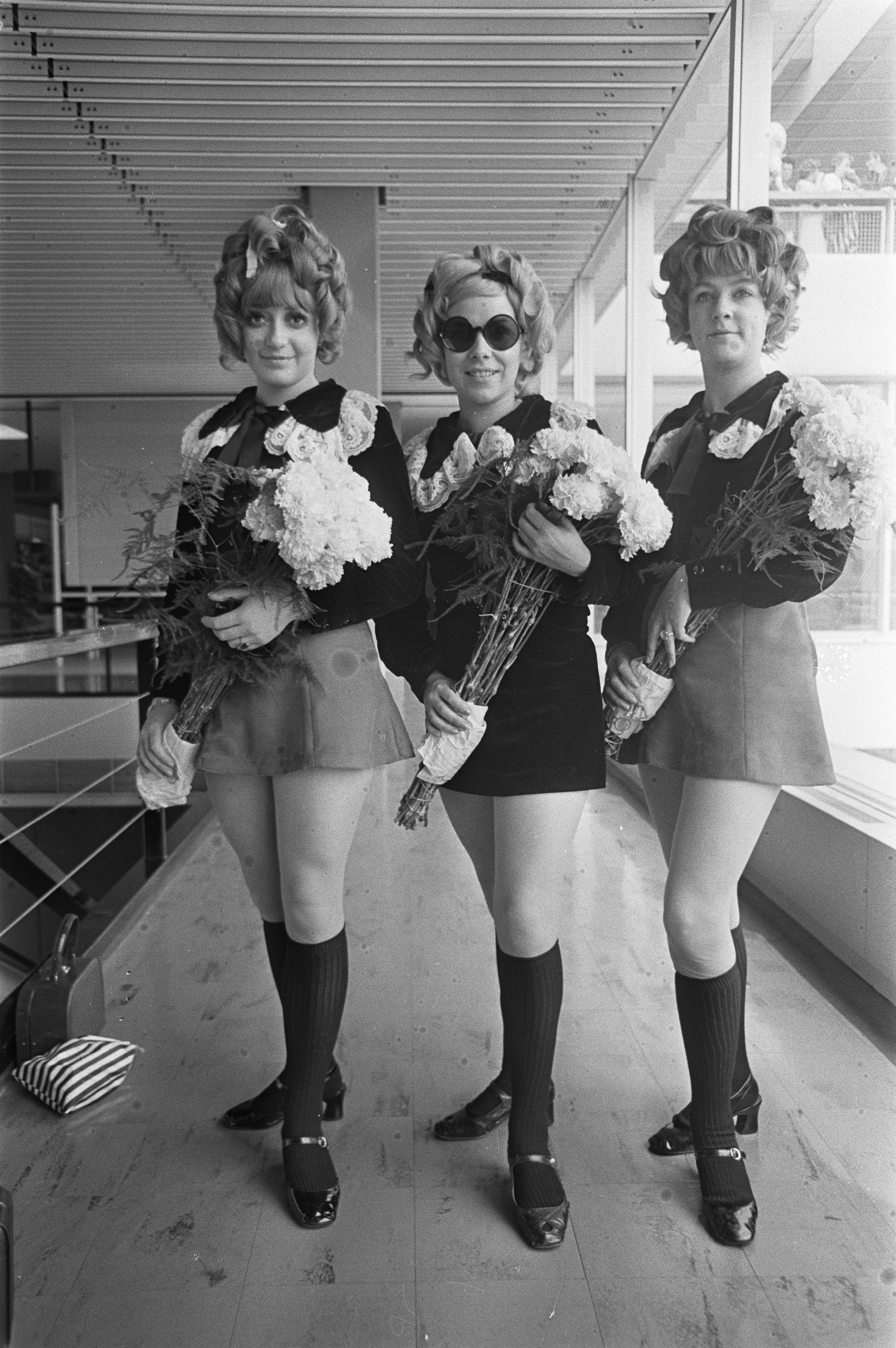
The English girl band The Paper Dolls at Schiphol Airport in 1968

The shape of miniskirts in the 1960s was distinctive. They were not the squeezingly tight skirts designed to show off every curve that 1950s sheath skirts had been, nor were they shortened versions of the tightly belted, petticoat-bolstered 1950s circle skirt. In the 1990s and later, exhibitions on the sixties would occasionally present vintage miniskirts pulled in tight against gallery mannequins, but sixties miniskirts were not worn tight in that way. Sixties miniskirts were simply-constructed, uninhibiting, slightly flared A-line shapes, with some straight and tapered forms seen in the early years of their existence. This shape was seen as deriving from two forms of the 1950s: (1) the shift dress, a waistless, tapered column introduced by Givenchy in 1955, presaged by Karl Lagerfeld in 1954, and refined by Givenchy and Balenciaga in 1957 under the names sack dress or chemise dress, and (2) the trapeze dresses popularized by Yves Saint Laurent at Dior in 1958 that were a variation of Dior's 1955 A-line, both of a geometric triangular shaping. In silhouette, the minidresses of the mid-1960s were basically abbreviated versions of the shift dress and trapeze dress, with Paco Rabanne's famous metal and plastic minidresses of 1966 and 1967 following the trapeze line and most of Rudi Gernreich's following the shift line. Even the unusual miniskirts produced by Pierre Cardin from 1967 to 1970 consisting of masses of strips or loops that swung about the hips still maintained a flaring shape. London boutiques sold naturally flaring choristers' smocks as minidresses. Mary Quant and other British designers, as well as Betsey Johnson in the US, also showed minidresses that resembled elongated rugby jerseys, body-skimming but not tight. When skirts were worn alone, they tended to sit on the hips rather than holding the waist, called hipster minis if they were really low on the hips. The fashionable forms of the microminis of the later 1960s were also not tight, often looking somewhat tunic-like and in fabrics like Qiana.

In addition, sixties miniskirts were not worn with high heels but with flats or low heels, for a natural stance, a natural stride, and to enhance the fashionable child-like look of the time, seen as a reaction to 1950s artifice like stiletto heels, constrained waists, padded busts, and movement-inhibiting skirts. Another way youth was indicated in the new short skirts was through using models with slim but muscular legs, as preferred by designers André Courrèges and Emanuel Ungaro at the time. The designer Mary Quant was quoted as saying that "short short skirts" indicated youthfulness, which was seen as desirable, fashion-wise.

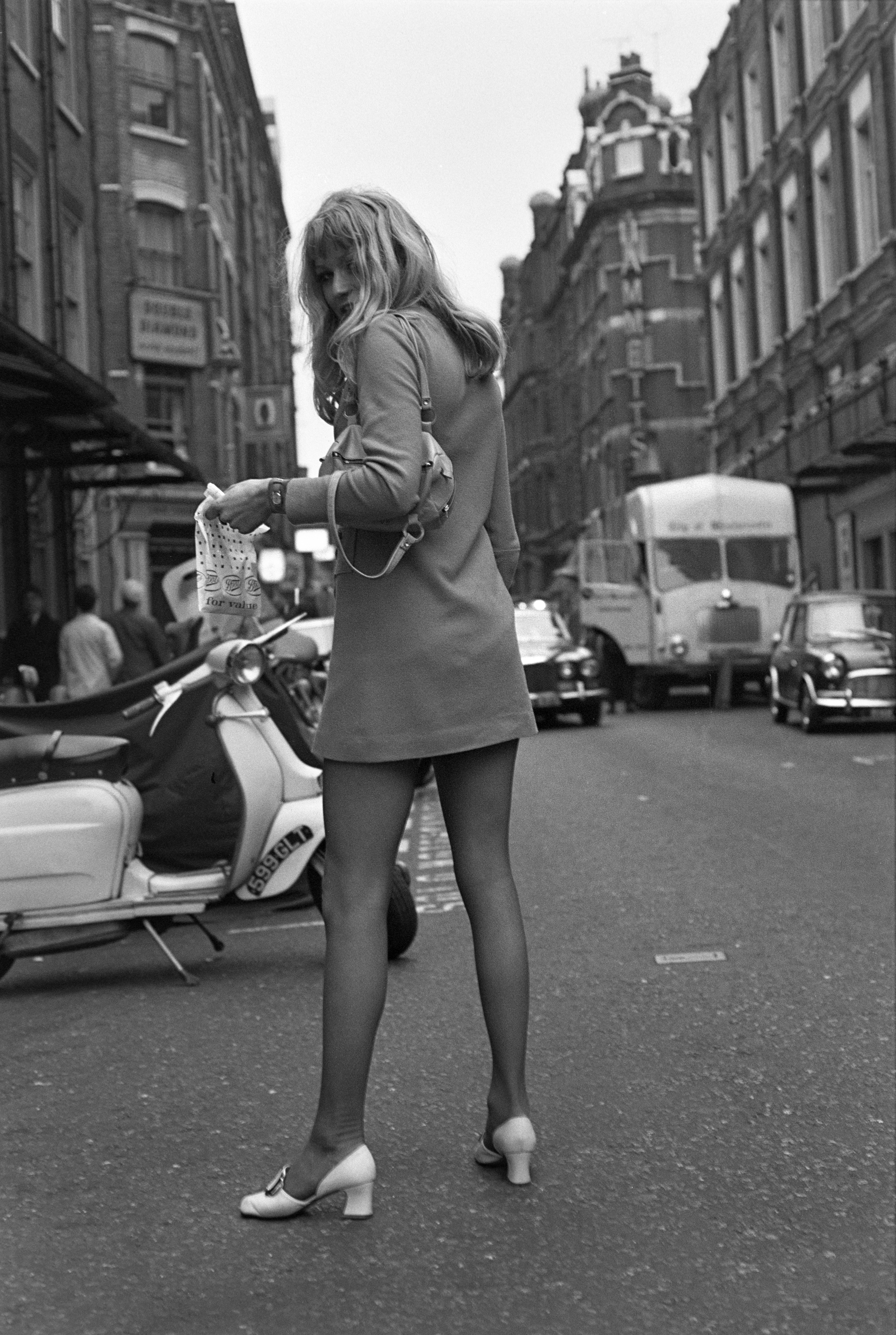
Young woman in London wearing a minidress, 1969

In the UK, skirts shortened to less than 24 inches (610 mm) were classed as children's garments rather than adult clothes. Children's clothing was not subject to purchase tax whereas adult clothing was. The avoidance of tax meant that the price was correspondingly less.

Stockings with suspenders (American English: "garters") were not considered practical with miniskirts and were replaced with coloured tights or pantyhose. Legs could also be covered with knee-high socks, occasional thigh-high stockings, or various heights of boots, lower-calf height in 1964–65, knee heights throughout the period, over-the-knee and thigh-high boots more 1967–69, and even boot-hose or body boots (tights incorporating a shoe sole and heel to form a waist-high boot), often in stretch vinyl. For versatility, fitted, knee-high spats/gaiters that zipped or velcroed on could be added to regular shoes if you wanted the look of a boot. Sandal straps or laces might crisscross or otherwise rise up the leg, even as high as the thigh, and body paints and leg makeup were offered for a time to add colour to the leg in more individualised ways than wearing tights.

While tights and pantyhose did solve some problems associated with the new short lengths, for more coverage some designers, primarily Ungaro, included matching shorts to be worn under their miniskirts, usually as short as or slightly shorter than the skirt but occasionally slightly longer. Skirt-looking shorts, known as divided skirts or culottes, long familiar items, were now also available in mini lengths, giving the look of a miniskirt but actually a bifurcated garment. Another concern as miniskirts became the norm was how older women and those with less-than-perfect legs could wear the new lengths. Designer Pierre Cardin attempted to address this problem in 1966 by recommending that skirt, tights, and shoes all be the same color and that the tights be somewhat thick.

According to shoe designer Roger Vivier, the miniskirt was partly responsible for the revival of platform shoes, which he reintroduced in 1967. The leading shoe designer of the late 1950s and early '60s, Vivier had begun the trend toward lower heels as early as 1956, and by the mid-1960s was producing some of the best of the low-heeled shoes worn with miniskirts, from the geometric-buckled pumps that accompanied Yves Saint Laurent's 1965 Mondrian collection to the range of transparent plastic footwear he showed in 1966. By 1967, he felt that so much visible leg needed to be counterbalanced by more weight at the foot and created updated platform shoes, launching a trend that would take off and become characteristic of the first half of the seventies, when they would mostly be worn with pants and knee-covering skirts, but the idea had initially come to Vivier as a way to alter the focus of the miniskirted silhouette of the late 1960s. Wearers of the time found that platform shoes were a way of visually lengthening the leg without resorting to high heels.

During the late 1960s, as most skirts became shorter and shorter, designers began offering a few alternatives. Calf-length midi-skirts were introduced in 1966–67, and floor-length maxi-skirts appeared around the same time after being seen on hippies first around 1965–66. Like miniskirts, these were overwhelmingly casual in feel and simply constructed to a two-straight-side-seams A-line shape. Women in the late sixties welcomed these new styles as options but did not necessarily wear them, feeling societal pressure to shorten their skirts instead.

As designers attempted to require women to switch to midi-skirts in 1969 and 1970, women, especially in the US, responded by ignoring them, continuing to wear minis and microminis and turning to trousers like those endorsed by Yves Saint Laurent in 1968, a trend that would dominate the 1970s.

=== Designer claims ===
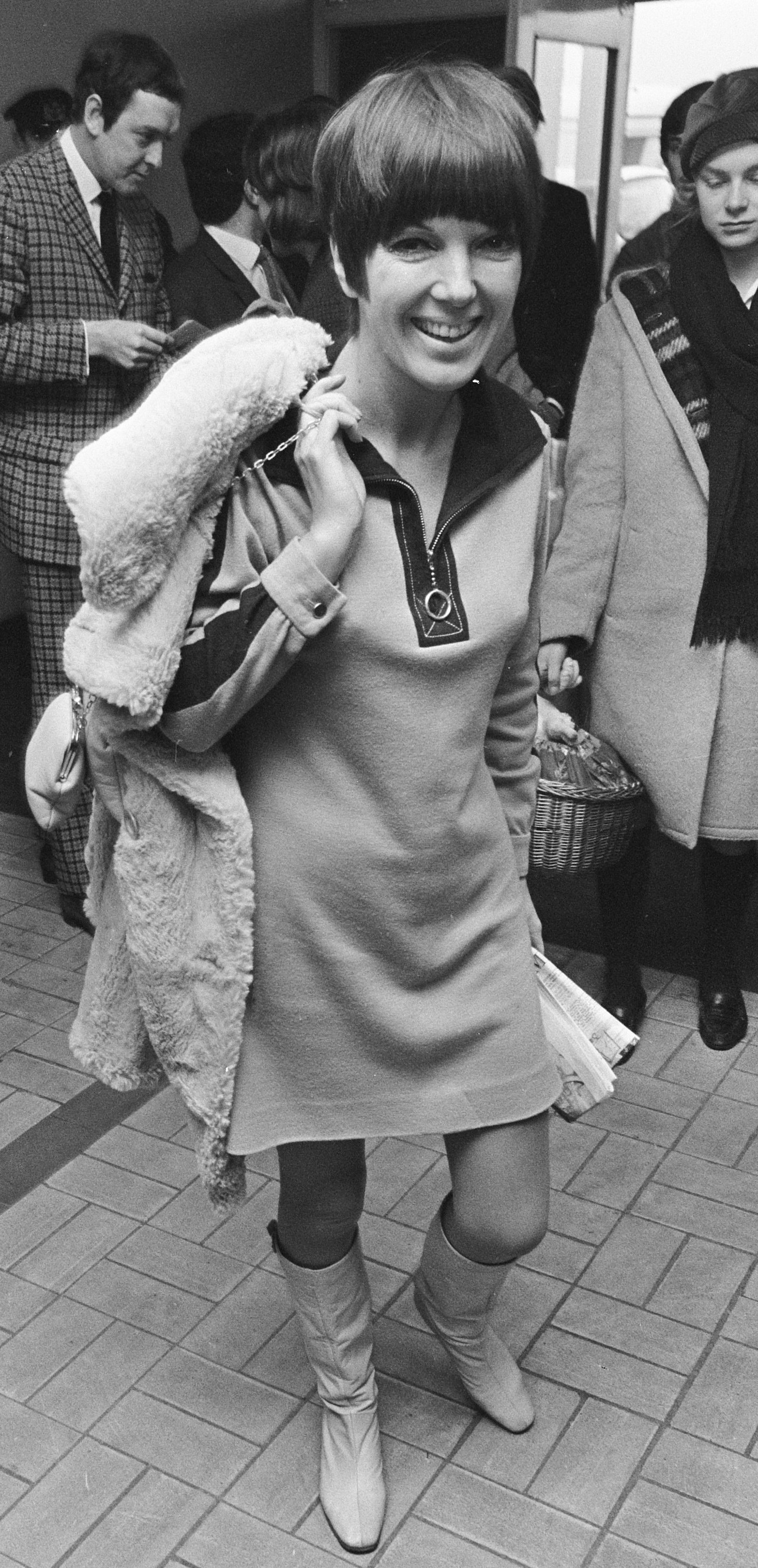
Mary Quant wearing a minidress (1966)

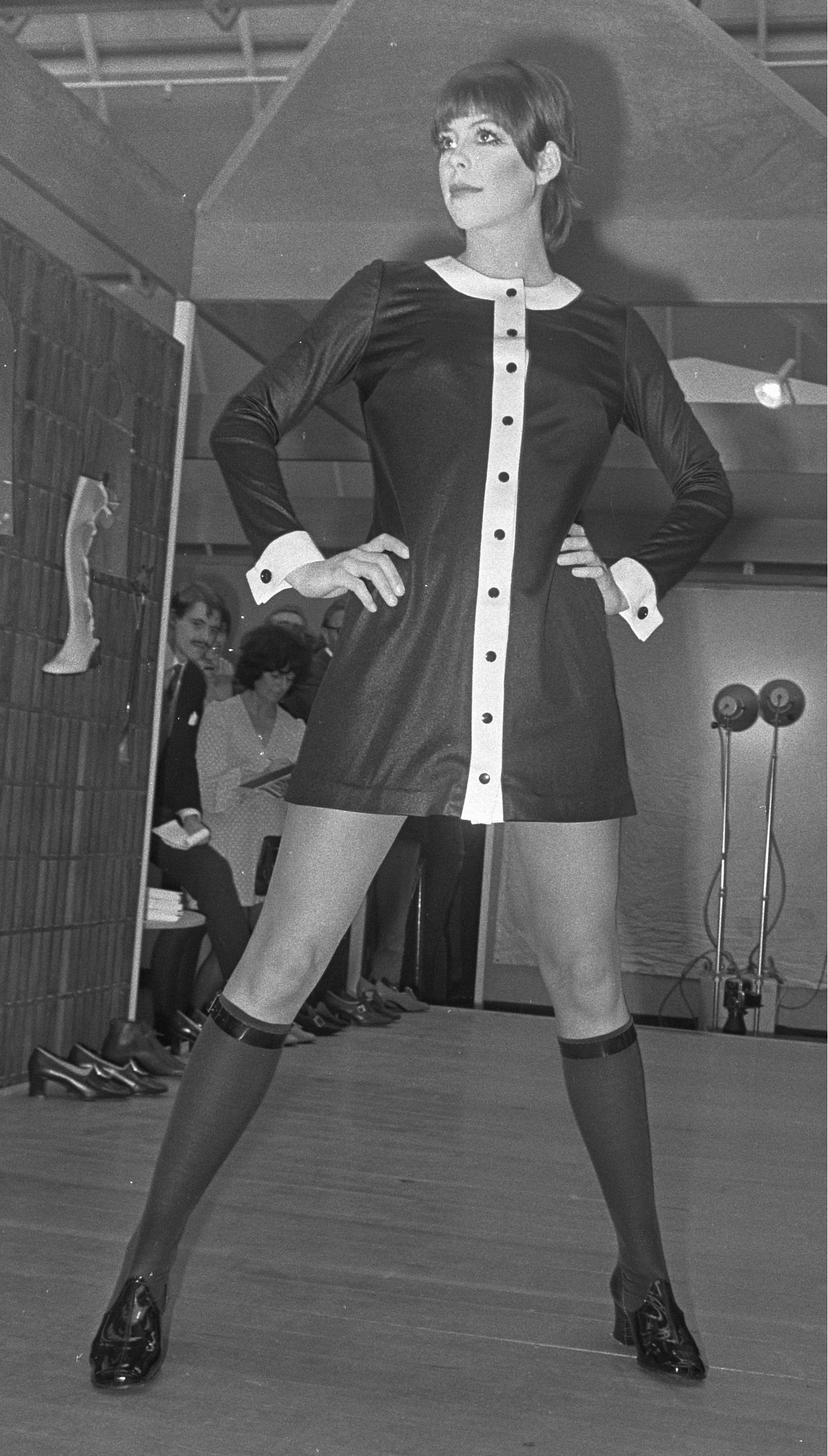
A Mary Quant minidress from 1969

Several designers have been credited with the invention of the 1960s miniskirt, most significantly the London-based designer Mary Quant and the Parisian André Courrèges. Although Quant reportedly named the skirt after her favourite make of car, the Mini, there is no consensus as to who designed it first. Valerie Steele has noted that the claim that Quant was first is more convincingly supported by evidence than the equivalent Courrèges claim. However, the contemporary fashion journalist Marit Allen, who edited the influential "Young Ideas" pages for UK Vogue, firmly stated that the British designer John Bates was the first to offer fashionable miniskirts. Other designers, including Pierre Cardin and Yves Saint Laurent, had also been raising hemlines at the same time.

==== Mary Quant ====
The miniskirt is one of the garments most widely associated with Mary Quant. Quant herself is ambivalent about the claim that she invented the miniskirt, stating that her customers should take credit, as she herself wore very short skirts, and they requested even shorter hemlines for themselves. Regardless of whether or not Quant invented the miniskirt, it is widely agreed that she was one of its highest-profile champions. Contrary to obvious and popular belief, Quant named the garment after the Mini Cooper, a favourite car of hers, stating that the car and the skirt were both "optimistic, exuberant, young, flirty", and complemented each other.

Quant had started experimenting with shorter skirts in the late 1950s, when she started making her own designs up to stock her boutique on the King's Road. Among her inspirations was the memory of seeing a young tap-dancer wearing a "tiny skirt over thick black tights", influencing her designs for young, active women who did not wish to resemble their mothers. In addition to the miniskirt, Quant is often credited with inventing the coloured and patterned tights that tended to accompany the garment, although their creation is also attributed to the Spanish couturier Cristóbal Balenciaga who offered harlequin-patterned tights in 1962 or to Bates.

In 2009, a Mary Quant minidress was among the 10 British "design classics" featured on a series of Royal Mail stamps, alongside the Tube map, the Spitfire, and the red telephone box.

==== André Courrèges ====
Courrèges explicitly claimed that he invented the mini, and accused Quant of only "commercialising" it. He presented short skirts measuring four inches above the knee in January 1965 for that year's Spring/Summer collection, although some sources claim that Courrèges had been designing miniskirts as early as 1961, the year he launched his couture house. The collection, which also included trouser suits and cut-out backs and midriffs, was designed for a new type of athletic, active young woman. Courrèges had presented "above-the-knee" skirts in his August 1964 haute couture presentation which was proclaimed the "best show seen so far" for that season by The New York Times. The Courrèges look, featuring a knit bodystocking with a gabardine miniskirt slung around the hips, was widely copied and plagiarised, much to the designer's chagrin, and it would be 1967 before he again held a press showing for his work. Steele has described Courrèges's work as a "brilliant couture version of youth fashion" whose sophistication far outshone Quant's work, although she champions the Quant claim. Others, such as Jess Cartner-Morley of The Guardian explicitly credit him, rather than Quant, as the miniskirt's creator.

==== John Bates and others ====
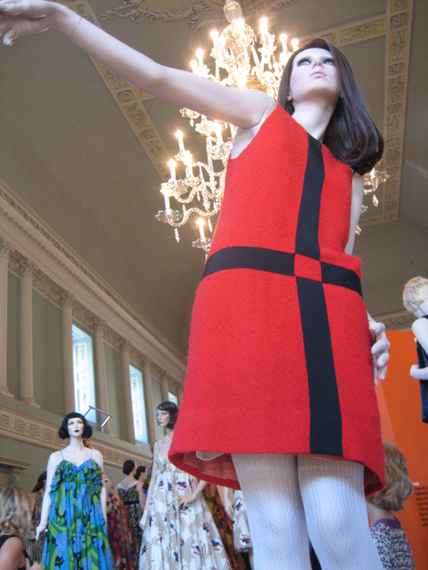
John Bates minidress, 1965. Originally designed for Diana Rigg as Emma Peel in The Avengers.

The idea that John Bates, rather than Quant or Courrèges, innovated the miniskirt had an influential champion in Marit Allen, who as editor of the influential "Young Ideas" pages for UK Vogue, kept track of up-and-coming young designers. In 1966 she chose Bates to design her mini-length wedding outfit in white gabardine and silver PVC. In January 1965 Bates's "skimp dress" with its "short-short skirt" was featured in Vogue, and would later be chosen as the Dress of the Year. Bates was also famous for having designed mini-coats and dresses and other outfits for Emma Peel (played by Diana Rigg) in the TV series The Avengers, although the manufacturers blocked his request for patterned tights to enable Emma Peel to fight in skirts if necessary.

An alternative origin story for the miniskirt came from Barbara Hulanicki from the London boutique Biba, who recalled that in 1966 she received a delivery of stretchy jersey skirts that had shrunk drastically in transit. Much to her surprise, the ten-inch long garments rapidly sold out.

In 1967 Rudi Gernreich was among the first American designers to offer miniskirts, in the face of strongly worded censure and criticism from American couturiers James Galanos and Norman Norell. Criticism of the miniskirt also came from the Paris couturier Coco Chanel, who declared the style "disgusting" despite being herself famed for supporting shorter skirts in the 1920s.

=== Reception ===
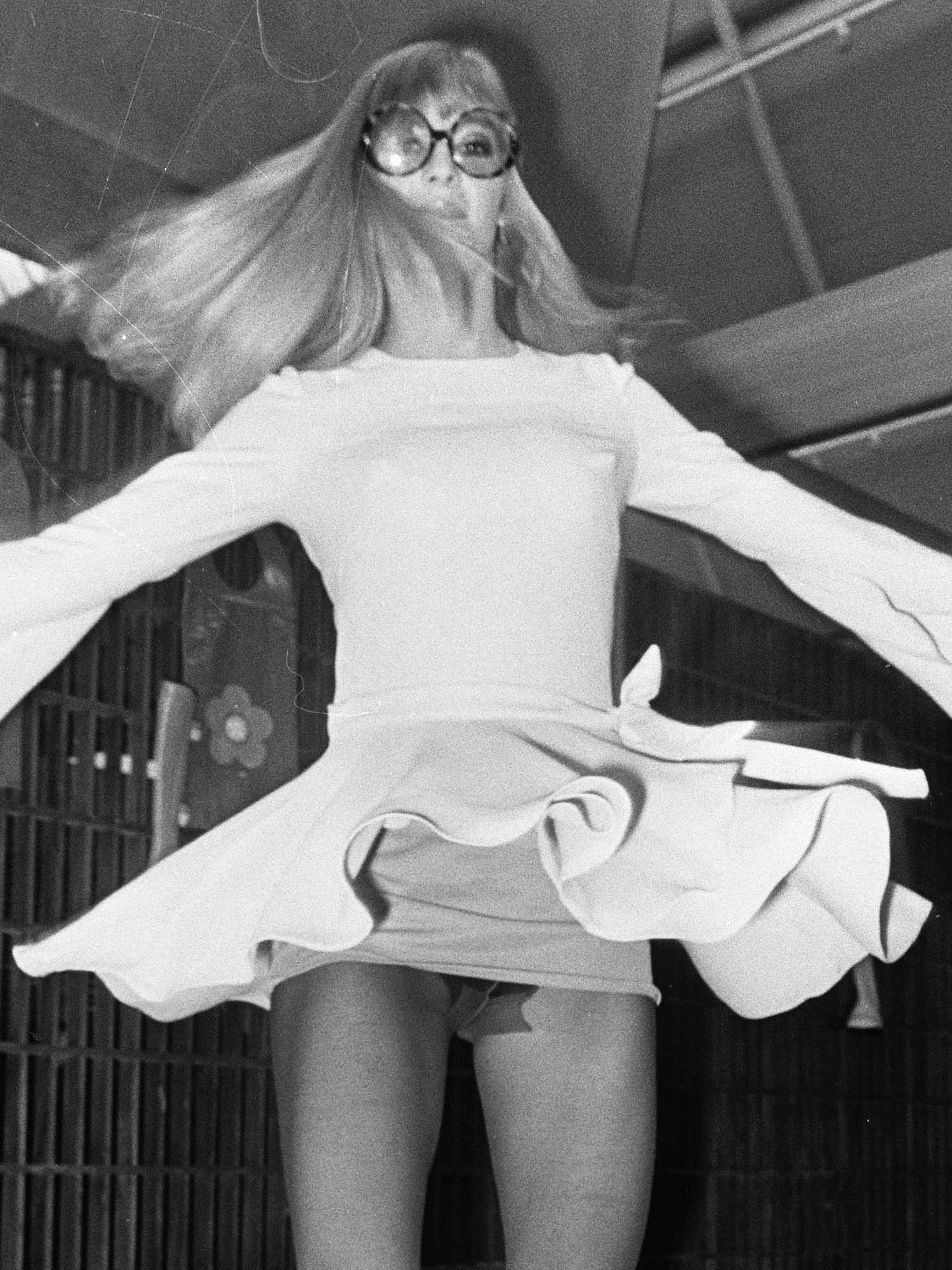
1969 Mary Quant minidress worn with tights and roll-on girdle.

Owing to Quant's position in the heart of fashionable "Swinging London", the miniskirt was able to spread beyond a simple street fashion into a major international trend, with not only significant aesthetic value but also considerable political worth. The style came into prominence in Australia when Jean Shrimpton wore a short white shift dress, made by Colin Rolfe, on 30 October 1965 at Derby Day, first day of the annual Melbourne Cup Carnival in Australia, where it caused a sensation. According to Shrimpton, who claimed that the brevity of the skirt was due mainly to Rolfe's having insufficient material, the ensuing controversy was as much as anything to do with her having dispensed with a hat and gloves, seen as essential accessories in such a conservative society.

During the 1960s and early '70s, the miniskirt was associated with social progress. The rise of the miniskirt in the 1960s coincided with sweeping societal changes, most relevantly the sexual revolution made possible by the introduction of birth control pills in the year 1960, opening the door to more sexual openness, which helped open the door to shorter skirt lengths. Also going on were civil rights movements, an international youth movement, increases in women's rights/women's liberation, anti-war movements, anti-colonial liberation movements, consumer rights movements, environmental movements, etc., all vast and mainstream during this period instead of small and marginal as in some other time periods. More casual dress standards were becoming the norm after the formal 1950s, and women were discarding the heavy, constricting undergarments worn in that decade like girdles, corsets, garters, and ultimately even bras, partly under the influence of designers André Courrèges and Rudi Gernreich, who began discouraging bras in the early 1960s. Led by Courrèges and shoe designer Roger Vivier, high heels were also deemphasized during this period in favor of flat shoes, as they freed the body from an unnatural posture and allowed a comfortable, healthy stride, just as short, flaring skirts and the newly acceptable women's trousers did. During the 1960s and early '70s, the then-new miniskirt came to be associated with these societal advances, which is part of the reason there was such strong resistance from many women when the fashion industry tried to declare the miniskirt outmoded in the year 1970. Miniskirts of the 1980s and later decades did not have this association, as miniskirts no longer seemed new or unique by that time and the social advances of the 1960s were either long established and in stasis or had been reversed, depending on region and time period.

==== Opposition ====
Early on, there was some opposition in the US to miniskirts as bad influences on the young, but this waned as people became more accustomed to them. Some European countries banned mini-skirts from being worn in public, claiming they were an invitation to rapists. In response, Quant retorted that there was clearly no understanding of the tights worn underneath.

Miniskirts arose at the same time women were beginning to wear trousers more in public, and both were controversial. Just as many schools attempted to control skirt hems via dress codes, many public establishments attempted to restrict women's wearing of pants by enforcing their own sartorial rules. Women sometimes forced establishments to make a choice between miniskirts and pants by trying to enter restaurants in tunic-topped pantsuits and then removing their trousers when restaurant staff objected, leaving the women in ultra-short mini-tunics that restaurants had to accept because their own rules stated that it was okay for women to wear skirts, an absurd outcome that eventually helped lead restaurants to relax their dress codes.

The response to the miniskirt was particularly harsh in Africa, where many state governments saw them as an un-African garment and part of the corrupting influence of the West. Young city-dwelling African women who wore Western clothing such as the miniskirt were particularly at risk of attack based on their clothing, although Robert Ross notes that gender roles and politics were also a key factor. The urban woman earning her own living and independence was seen as a threat to masculine authority, particularly if she wore clothing seen as un-African. Short skirts were seen as indicating that their wearer was a prostitute, and by conflation, a witch who drained male-dominated society of its vitality and energy. In addition to prostitutes and witches, miniskirts also became associated with secretaries, schoolgirls and undergraduates, and young women with "sugar daddies" as lovers or boyfriends. Andrew M. Ivaska has noted that these various tropes boiled down to a basic fear of female power, fear that a woman would use her education or sexual power to control men and/or achieve her own independence, and that the miniskirt therefore became a tangible object of these fears.

In 1968, the Youth League of Tanzania's ruling TANU party launched Operation Vijana. Organised and run by young men, Vijana was a morality campaign targeting indecent clothing, which led to attacks on women with at least one stoning reportedly triggered by the victim's miniskirt. Gangs of youths patrolled bus stations and streets looking for women dressed "inappropriately", and dealing out physical attacks and beatings. In Ethiopia, an attack on women wearing miniskirts triggered a riot of leftist students in which a hundred cars were set on fire and fifty people injured.

Kamuzu Banda, president of Malawi, described miniskirts as a "diabolic fashion which must disappear from the country once and for all." It is also reported that Kenneth Kaunda, president of Zambia, cited apartheid and the miniskirt as his two primary hates. By the mid-1970s the Zanzibar revolutionary party had forbidden both women and men from wearing a long list of garments, hairstyles and cosmetics, including miniskirts.

Park Chung Hee, ruler of South Korea, signed a law in 1973 that banned miniskirts, described specifically as the hem "17 centimeters or higher above their knees".

In the Soviet Union, miniskirts became widely known after the 1967 Moscow International Fashion Festival, and quickly made their way into popular media, including movies (The Diamond Arm, Afonya, Office Romance; an earlier 1956 film Carnival Night also featured dancers wearing short dresses and a conservative Soviet bureaucrat outraged by their "naked legs"), cartoons (The Bremen Town Musicians) and sci-fi works (i.e. Definitely Maybe and The Final Circle of Paradise), despite strong criticism from senior citizens and attempts to control skirt lengths in public (which continued well into the 1980s - for example, hard rock vocalist Elena Sokolova has angered the authorities by wearing an extremely short skirt on stage during her performance at the Rock Panorama '86 festival). One of the best known Soviet designers of miniskirts was Vyacheslav Zaitsev. Short skirts and dresses remain popular in modern day Russia (except for some conservative Muslim regions like Dagestan, where wearing miniskirts is strongly frowned upon and discouraged by travel advisories).

In China the miniskirt was frowned upon and the government called the Moscow International Fashion Festival as Soviet "degradation as revisionists".

== Post-1960s ==
=== 1970s ===
From 1969 onwards, the fashion industry largely returned to longer skirts such as the midi and the maxi, with even Mary Quant showing no above-the-knee skirts for 1970. Journalist Christopher Booker gave two reasons for this reaction: firstly, that "there was almost nowhere else to go ... the mini-skirts could go no higher"; and secondly, in his view, "dressed up in mini-skirts and shiny PVC macs, given such impersonal names as 'dolly birds', girls had been transformed into throwaway plastic objects". This lengthening of hemlines coincided with the growth of the feminist movement. However, in the 1960s the mini had been regarded as a symbol of liberation, and it was worn by some, such as Germaine Greer and, in the following decade, Gloria Steinem. Greer herself wrote in 1969 that:

The women kept on dancing while their long skirts crept up, and their girdles dissolved, and their nipples burst through like hyacinth tips and their clothes withered away to the mere wisps and ghosts of draperies to adorn and glorify ...

In the earliest seventies, particularly in the US, minis and microminis briefly rebounded in popularity after women's rejection of designers' attempt to impose midiskirts as the sole length in 1970, referred to as "the midi debacle". Women both continued to wear miniskirts and switched even more to trousers, and designers, having been made to understand that they would no longer be respected as arbiters, followed suit for a couple of years and included minis again, often underneath midis and maxis. Beginning at the end of the 1960s, minis during this period might be worn with chunky platform shoes, often with high wedge heels. In 1971, almost all designers, even upper-echelon couture designers, showed hot pants, also presented in combination with midiskirts, maxiskirts, and minis. They continued to express a desire for women to wear longer skirts, though, and soon those women who had not switched entirely to jeans and trousers were often wearing their skirts at the knee. In 1973, Kenzo made calf-length skirts look new by cutting them fuller and in lighter fabrics for a style that was very different from the midi and women soon accepted this, making it one of the characteristic styles of the mid-seventies, one that would last into the early eighties, sometimes dropping to the ankle.

The "midi debacle" was also a feature in regions outside the fashion centers of the US and western Europe. In 1970, there was a publicized women's march in Mexico City for the right to wear minis and criticising midis. In some regions the miniskirt continued or even increased in popularity during the 1970s, for example in Turkey.

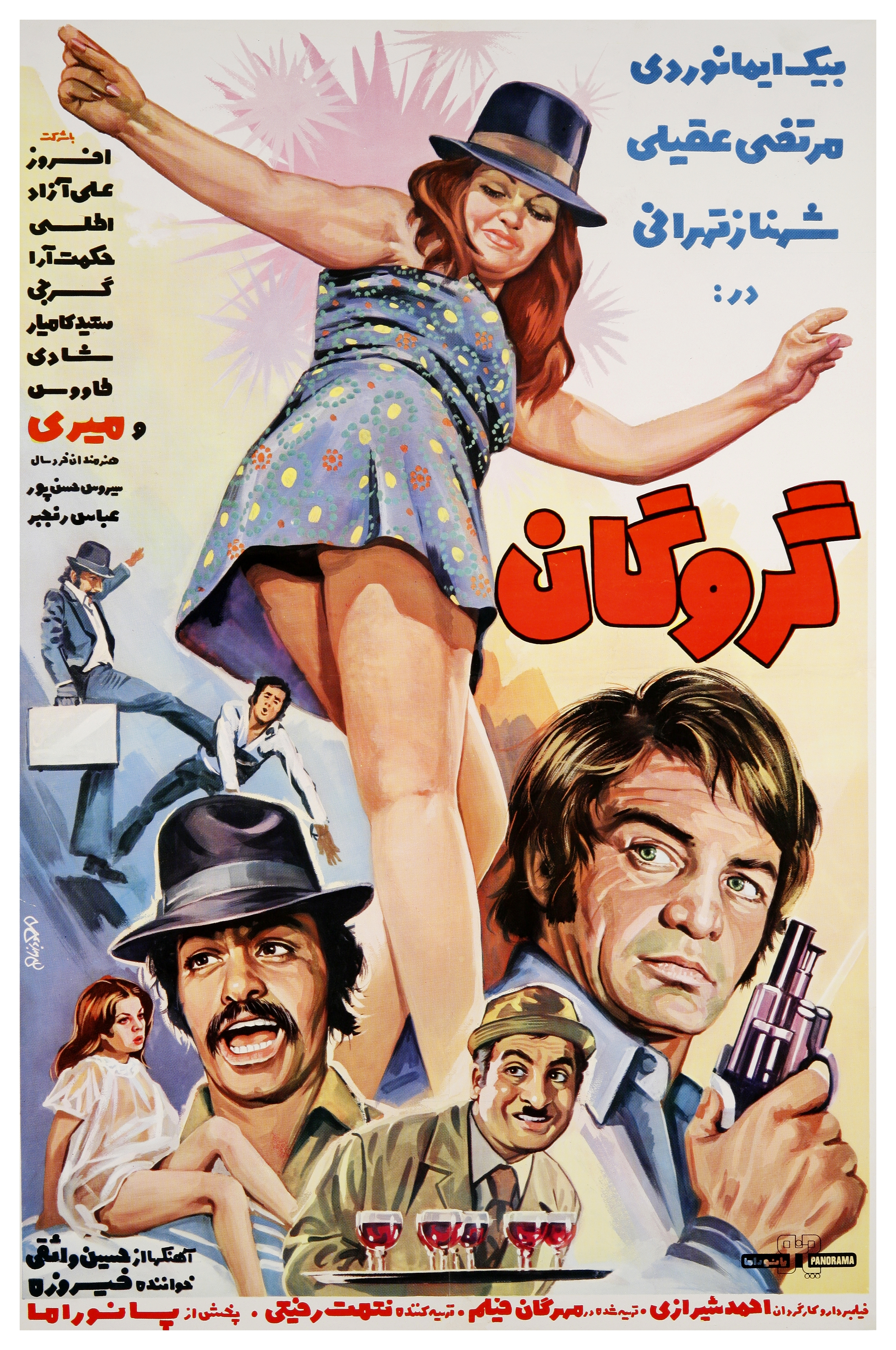
Poster for the Iranian film Hostage (1974)

Although miniskirts had mostly disappeared from mainstream fashion by the mid-1970s, prompting the leading designer of the time, Yves Saint Laurent, to say, "I don't think short skirts will ever come back", they never entirely went away, with women having to be pressured by the fashion industry to abandon above-the-knee skirts as late as 1974, miniskirt stalwart André Courrèges continuing to show them, and even some mainstream designers like Halston, Kenzo, and Karl Lagerfeld offering a few mini-tunics and mini-blousons. Kenzo was the most influential in this and would continue showing minis from 1976 on, no matter what other designers were doing. The bloused and billowy Big Look dominated high fashion in the mid-seventies and the minis offered tended to be equally full, some just oversized blouses, smocks, sweaters, and blousons worn on their own, others full, knee-length or longer tent dresses or smock dresses hiked up to the thigh via a rope-belt at the hips, the fullness billowing over the belt. In these occasional high-fashion versions of the mid-seventies, mini was taken to mean any length above the knee. Enough above-the-knee skirts were shown in Paris in 1976 for fashion writers to suggest a possible mini revival, but these were never broadly taken up by the general public, which was still gravitating toward below-the-knee dirndls.

Sixties trailblazers André Courrèges and Pierre Cardin tended to be considered eccentric during the 1970s, partly because they persisted in showing some miniskirts past 1972. Courrèges lengthened his from their 1969-70 peak in brevity and continued showing versions of his practical white shift dresses, now returned to a just-above-the-knee length. Cardin continued the experimentation he had become known for in the previous decade, presenting a variety of minskirt shapes throughout the seventies. In 1972, he began adding wire hoops, sometimes multiple hoops at various heights, to every length of skirt, even minis, something he would continue to do into the 1980s. More practical were the tennis skirts shown by both designers during the decade, tennis players always providing a sure market for short skirts no matter what else is going on in the fashion world.

Around 1976, punks began including among their array of clothes intended to shock very short miniskirts in materials like black leather, rubber, PVC, tartan, and even trash bag plastic, the unfashionable length shocking almost as much as the aggressive materials. Examples from this 1976–77 period can be seen on Soo Catwoman, Jordan, the Slits, Siouxsie Sioux of Siouxsie and the Banshees, and Poly Styrene of X-Ray Spex. Punks at this time also introduced the wearing of miniskirts with then-very-out-of-style high-heeled, late-1950s pumps, which they got at thrift shops, a combination not worn in the 1960s and unthinkable during the 1950s. Though not at all mainstream, these punk looks would influence bands that came after them into wearing more sixties-looking miniskirts again, as evidenced by Deborah Harry of the group Blondie, Kate Pierson and Cindy Wilson of the B-52's, Annie Lennox of the Tourists, Fay Fife of the Revillos, the members of the Bodysnatchers, and the members of the Modettes during the "new wave" era of the late 1970s. Some of these performers were part of a few sixties-revival subcultures that came in the wake of punk and included Mod revival and ska revival, both of whose female adherents sought out authentic early miniskirts as part of their sixties-revival look. Blondie's Debbie Harry had her punkish, sixties-ish look provided by fashion designers Anya Phillips and Stephen Sprouse. Sprouse had been responsible for Halston's "skimp" minis of 1974 and would become internationally known for his own sixties-revival line during the eighties. The song "(I Don't Want to Go to) Chelsea" (1978), by new wave artist Elvis Costello, contains the line in the chorus: "There's no place here for the mini-skirt waddle."

During the seventies, when males and females typically wore identical denim cutoff shorts instead of miniskirts if they wanted short lengths, the female cast members of the US TV show Hee Haw, known as the "Hee Haw Honeys", always wore country-style minidresses even during the miniskirt's fashion hiatus in the late 1970s and early 1980s; and as mentioned above, female tennis players, figure skaters, cheerleaders, and dancers also wore short skirts.

Toward the end of the seventies, in 1978 and 1979, some of the above-the-knee skirt looks that would become associated with the eighties began to be introduced, including the flounced, hip-yoked style debuted by Norma Kamali and Perry Ellis in 1979 and called rah-rah skirts in the UK and above-the-knee versions of the tight sheath skirt, with even Yves Saint Laurent showing some above-the-knee lengths. Perry Ellis presented flippy, mid-thigh-length skirts in late 1978 that resembled somewhat the skating skirts and cycling skirts of the late 1950s and paired them with prominently shoulder-padded tops, establishing a proportion that would continue into the 1980s. Other trends that would dominate the eighties were also debuted by designers during this period, including the shortening to mini length of structured skirt shapes from the 1950s like pouf/bubble skirts and crinoline skirts. The sixties-revival subcultures emanating from the UK seemed to reach the high fashion world somewhat in 1979, as a few Paris catwalks presented styles seemingly pulled right out of the sixties, including miniskirts inspired by Courrèges, Rabanne, and Gernreich. Courrèges himself revived some of his sixties styles that year. Some fashion writers even proclaimed a miniskirt revival for 1979-80, particularly from Paris designers. At this point, these styles were still considered avant-garde, though, and a variety of mostly longer skirts were worn by the public, with the full, calf-length forms that had dominated the mid-seventies still prevalent but beginning to be made slimmer, slightly shorter, more brightly coloured, and often slit. The mainstream return of the miniskirt would not come until the 1980s.

=== 1980s and 1990s ===
Miniskirts returned to mainstream acceptance in the 1980s, but with some differences from the 1960s.

Because women had worn skirts that covered the knee and often dropped to the calf for much of the 1970s, any skirt above the knee was often called a miniskirt in the late seventies and early eighties, even skirts that hit just above the knee.

They were not presented this time as the only length women should wear, nor was there societal pressure for women to shorten their hemlines, as there had been in the late 1960s when designers also presented a variety of lengths. They were now just one option among a variety of lengths and styles of skirts and pants available to women, and miniskirts tended to be in the minority among all the other kinds of skirts and pants seen on the streets, particularly in the early part of the decade. Throughout the decade, street lengths ranged from ankle to thigh, for both skirts and trousers, and most women wore their skirts just below the knee, as they also had in the seventies.

Miniskirts came in a greater variety of shapes than in the sixties, from full and flouncy to narrow to tight to abbreviated revivals of skirt shapes of the 1940s and 1950s like sheath skirts, trumpet skirts, tulip skirts, and bubble/puffball skirts. Above-the-knee versions of strapless 1950s dresses were seen, as were formal minis with bustles and trains in the back. Even tutus were shown mid-decade. Many above-the-knee dresses had noticeable shoulder pads.

They were worn with a greater range of heel heights than in the sixties, depending on the shape of the miniskirt, with flats preferred for some styles and high-heeled pumps preferred for others. In the early part of the decade, opaque tights, sometimes brightly coloured, and flat, calf-high boots might be worn with the more casual styles, much like in the mid-sixties. Throughout the period, dressier styles with high heels tended to be worn with hose ranging from slightly tinted to opaque. A punk influence was sometimes seen when miniskirts were paired with combat boots or Doc Martens.

Another difference between 1960s miniskirts and 1980s miniskirts is that 1980s miniskirts might be worn over footless tights, long tight shorts, various lengths of thermal underwear, or tight, cropped pants, a trend that began with designers like Norma Kamali, Perry Ellis, and Willi Smith in 1979. Unlike the matching shorts occasionally worn with miniskirts during the 1960s, these were entirely separate garments, not part of an ensemble, that typically were in a different fabric and color than the skirt. In the early eighties, the footless tights might be referred to by the 1950s terms clamdiggers, pedal-pushers, capri pants, or toreadors, depending on their length, but in the second half of the eighties, all footless tights began to be referred to as leggings. Also at the end of the eighties, visible bike shorts were often worn with miniskirts.

In the early eighties, miniskirts were still considered avant-garde and unusual among the public, though designers had begun showing them again in 1979 and had resumed shortening some skirts to just above the knee in 1978. Some minis from 1979 and '80 were modeled after sweatshirts. Others were lifted straight out of the Space Age mid-sixties. Some were inspired by punk. Some sixties-revival or sixties-sounding female musical performers of the early eighties combined punk elements and eighties-style miniskirts with actual sixties-vintage minis, as in bands like the early Go-Go's, the early Bangles, and the Pandoras, with even the bands' names redolent of the sixties.

The most influential designer of miniskirts in the early eighties was Norma Kamali. In 1980, when there was a fad for wearing oversized sweatshirts as minidresses, she introduced sweatshirt-fabric versions of the flounced, hip-yoked, above-the-knee skirts she had first presented in 1979, called rah-rah skirts in the UK. In 1981 and '82, miniskirts from this "Sweats" line would reach mainstream levels of popularity, the first minis to do so since the early 1970s, making Kamali a household name.

While still showing a range of lengths, other designers had also increased the number of miniskirts in their collections by the end of 1981, including Kenzo (who had never stopped showing them since he reintroduced them in 1976), Calvin Klein, Halston, Karl Lagerfeld, and Yves Saint Laurent. Saint Laurent's lower-thigh-length mini-sheath skirts in metallic gold leather were a particular hit among socialites in early 1981, and the broader public was beginning to warm to the idea of minis as well.

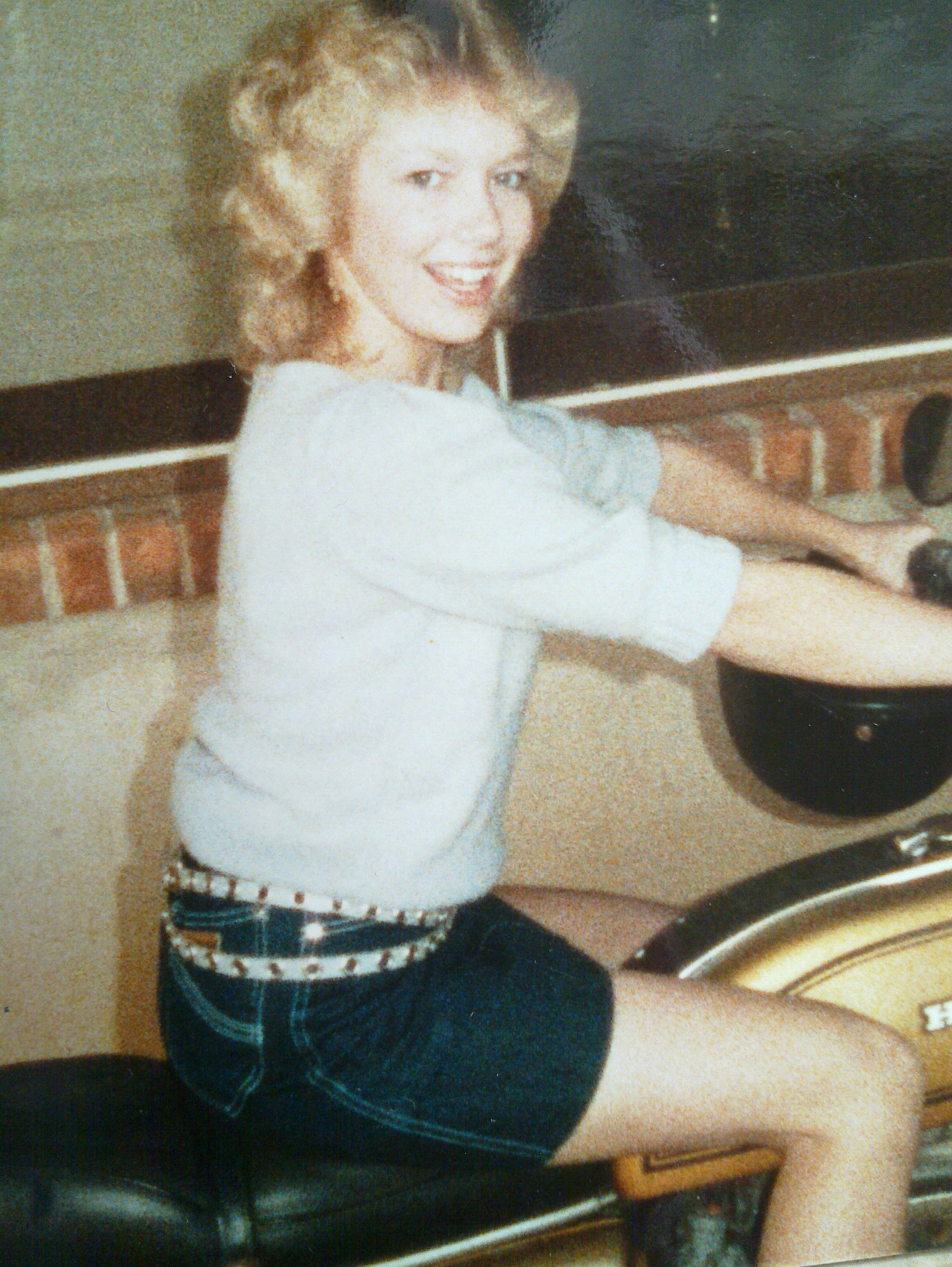
A young woman from the mid-1980s wearing a denim miniskirt with two thin belts or a single double-wrap belt.

In the spring of 1982 (as featured in the June issue of Time Magazine that year), short skirts began to re-emerge more strongly among the public, notably in the form of "rah-rahs", which were modeled on those worn by female cheerleaders at sporting and other events.

By 1983, miniskirts had become more widespread, but the Kamali-style full versions common in 1981-82 had waned in popularity in favor of slim, straight minis in jean-cut blue denim, as well as other trim styles.

Kenzo had been almost the only designer to champion miniskirts during their nadir in the mid-seventies, and he was vindicated in the eighties as several of the miniskirt styles he had shown back then were taken up by other designers. He continued to include miniskirts among a range of lengths during the eighties.

Yves Saint Laurent had believed short skirts would never return in the mid-seventies, but he led the move to above-the-knee skirts starting in 1978 and during the first half of the eighties was known for a number of brief but dressy skirt styles, especially slim, black leather miniskirts.

Karl Lagerfeld had begun showing miniskirts again at the end of the seventies and in 1983 would take over the house of Chanel, where he soon began adding minis and microminis to the offerings, a surprise because Chanel herself had hated 1960s miniskirts, considering the knees to be an ugly part of the body.

Throughout the 1980s, beginning at the end of the seventies, designers experimented with shortening heavily constructed historical dress styles, mostly from the 1950s, with fifties crinoline skirts, fifties sheath skirts, and fifties bubble/puffball skirts shown in above-the-knee lengths as early as 1979. Styles from the deeper past were also shortened. In the early eighties, Perry Ellis referenced the sixteenth through eighteenth centuries by altering the shape of the flouncy, hip-yoked miniskirts he'd been showing since 1979. In 1980, he bolstered them with petticoats and added stiffening to extend them out to the sides, causing some fashion writers to compare them to panniers. In others, he moved the fullness to the back for mini-length bustles. The following year, he added stuffed-organdy padding to the skirts and referred to them as farthingales, a sixteenth-century term for a similarly padded floor-length skirt. A better known example of a truncated historical skirt style came from former punk designer Vivienne Westwood. In 1985, British designer Westwood offered her first "mini-crini," an abbreviated version of the Victorian crinoline, complete with wire cage. Its mini-length, bouffant silhouette inspired the puffball skirts widely presented by more mainstream designers such as Christian Lacroix. Designers had been reviving pouf skirts, bubble skirts, and 1950s-style crinoline skirts in mini lengths since the end of the 1970s, but Westwood's 1860s-structured mini-crinis strengthened interest in such shapes among both the fashion industry and the public, so that by Lacroix's peak of influence in 1986-87, the designer could present a range of heavily constructed historical dress styles in mini lengths: minis with bustles, mini-pouf skirts, mini-crinolines, mini-tutus. In 1989, Westwood's mini-crini was described as having combined two conflicting ideals – the crinoline, representing a "mythology of restriction and encumbrance in woman's dress", and the "equally dubious mythology of liberation" associated with the miniskirt.

Besides the wire-framed mini-crinolines offered by Vivienne Westwood, wiring would also occasionally appear in other miniskirts of the period. Pierre Cardin had been adding hoops and wires to minis and longer skirts since 1972 and would do so even more during the 1980s, and Georgina Godley occasionally added sinuous wiring to hems as well. While hooped or wired miniskirts never really caught on with the public, singer Kate Pierson of popular music group the B-52's did sport one on the cover of their 1983 Whammy! album.

Sixties-revivalist Stephen Sprouse showed his first collection in 1983 and favored almost period-perfect shift minidresses and trapeze minidresses in graffiti prints, blacks, and searing sixties brights, including fluorescents, with geometric paillettes and sixties-style cutouts, sometimes of peace signs. Some of his microminis were in patent leather. Others were in stretch fabrics for an eighties-style tight fit. Also eighties-style and very unlike the 1960s were the shoes he showed with these clothes: 1980s shoe shapes like high-heeled pumps and Doc Martens. Other designers who focused on sixties-revival looks, including sixties-looking miniskirts, for periods of time during the eighties included David Cameron, Robert Molnar, Katharine Hamnett, and Liza Bruce.

Tight, stretch miniskirts and minidresses had been introduced at the end of the seventies. They would be seen off and on throughout the eighties and would become common in the second half of the decade, worn with high-heeled eighties pumps and often padded shoulders. In silhouette, these dresses were sort of an abbreviated, less heavily constructed version of 1950s sheath skirts. Some of the more simply constructed of these tight stretch sheath skirts/dresses were actually longer in length, sometimes well below the knee, but could be pulled up to whatever length the wearer desired. These forms of tight, blatantly seductive 1980s minis were shown on bodies that were voluptuous and/or muscular instead of thin and child-like as in the sixties. When these stretch minidresses were paired with sixties-style makeup and accessories, it was a lesson in the differences between sixties minis and eighties minis.

In the mid-1980s, Azzedine Alaïa began presenting mini and micromini versions of his extremely tight dress designs, his anatomical seaming and occasional sheer fabrics creating a prurient effect that would never have been seen in sixties miniskirts. His miniskirts, though, also included some that resembled flippy skating skirts and others that were grass-like raffia so short they barely covered the wearer. His earlier fitted, curve-accenting skirts, usually in a just-above-the-knee length that sometimes rose to the lower thigh, would be very influential in the second half of the decade, spawning imitations by companies like North Beach Leather and Body Glove.

During the mid- to late eighties, Patrick Kelly made his own versions of the familiar, high-heel-accompanied, tight, stretch minidresses of the decade, covering them with bright buttons, bright bowties, cartoon faces, etc.

For fall of 1987 and spring of '88, designers united in presenting a great proportion of miniskirts in almost all collections, with very few mainstream designers bucking the trend. Though a few designers showed these minis in somewhat sixties shapes with flat shoes or boots, most showed truncated versions of eighties suits and cocktail dresses with slightly narrower shoulders, worn with high-heeled over-the-knee boots or high-heeled eighties pumps that looked like pumps from the late fifties/early sixties. Dark hose were recommended for them. Many of the new minis were stretch-fit tight, and some were very short, with Ungaro's so brief they were likened to 1950s bathing suits. The fashion industry's miniskirt campaign was so intense that newspaper articles appeared on women considering plastic surgery on their knees to suit the new lengths.

However, though there was a rush on miniskirts for a time, the unanimity around mini lengths did not last long, as women continued to consider minis just one option among the many available during the decade and did not replace their entire wardrobes with them as they had in the sixties. That so many of the new miniskirts were skin-tight also meant that they were less appealing to many women than the flaring A-line miniskirts of the 1960s had been. This 1987-88 miniskirt push, though, would help cement the mini's status as a basic item in the average woman's wardrobe for many years to come.

From the 1980s, many women began to incorporate the miniskirt into their business attire, a trend which grew during the remainder of the century. The titular character of the 1990s television program Ally McBeal, a lawyer portrayed by Calista Flockhart, has been credited with popularising micro-skirts.

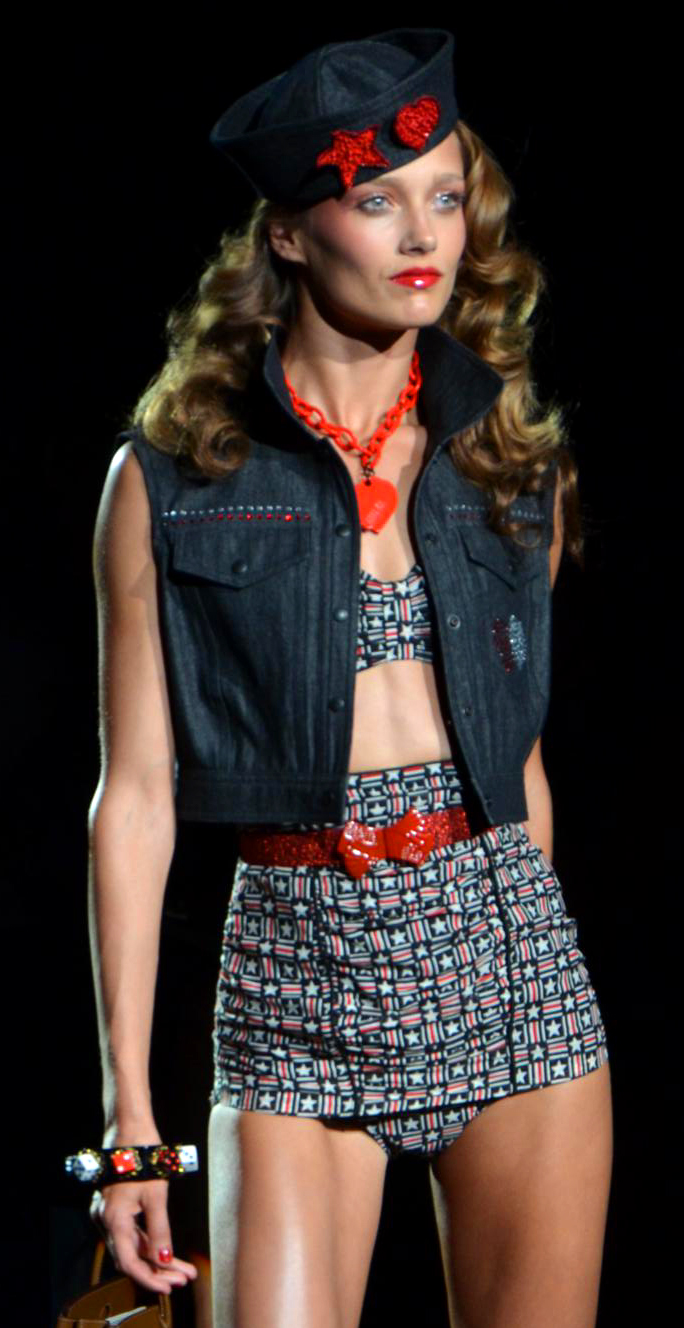
Anna Sui microskirt with matching underwear, 2011

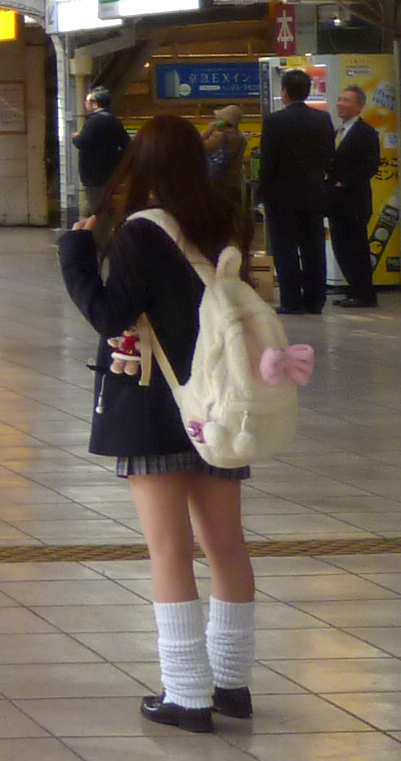
Japanese kogal schoolgirl including short skirt

The very short skirt is an element of Japanese school uniform, which since the 1990s has been exploited by young women who are part of the kogal (or gyaru) subculture as part of their look.

=== 2000s and 2010s ===
In the early 2000s, micro-minis were once again revived. In 2003, Tom Ford, at that time described as one of the few designers able to effortlessly dictate changes in fashion, stated that micro-skirts would be the height of fashion for Spring/Summer 2003. For fashionable wear, early 21st century microskirts were often worn with leggings or tights in order to avoid revealing too much.

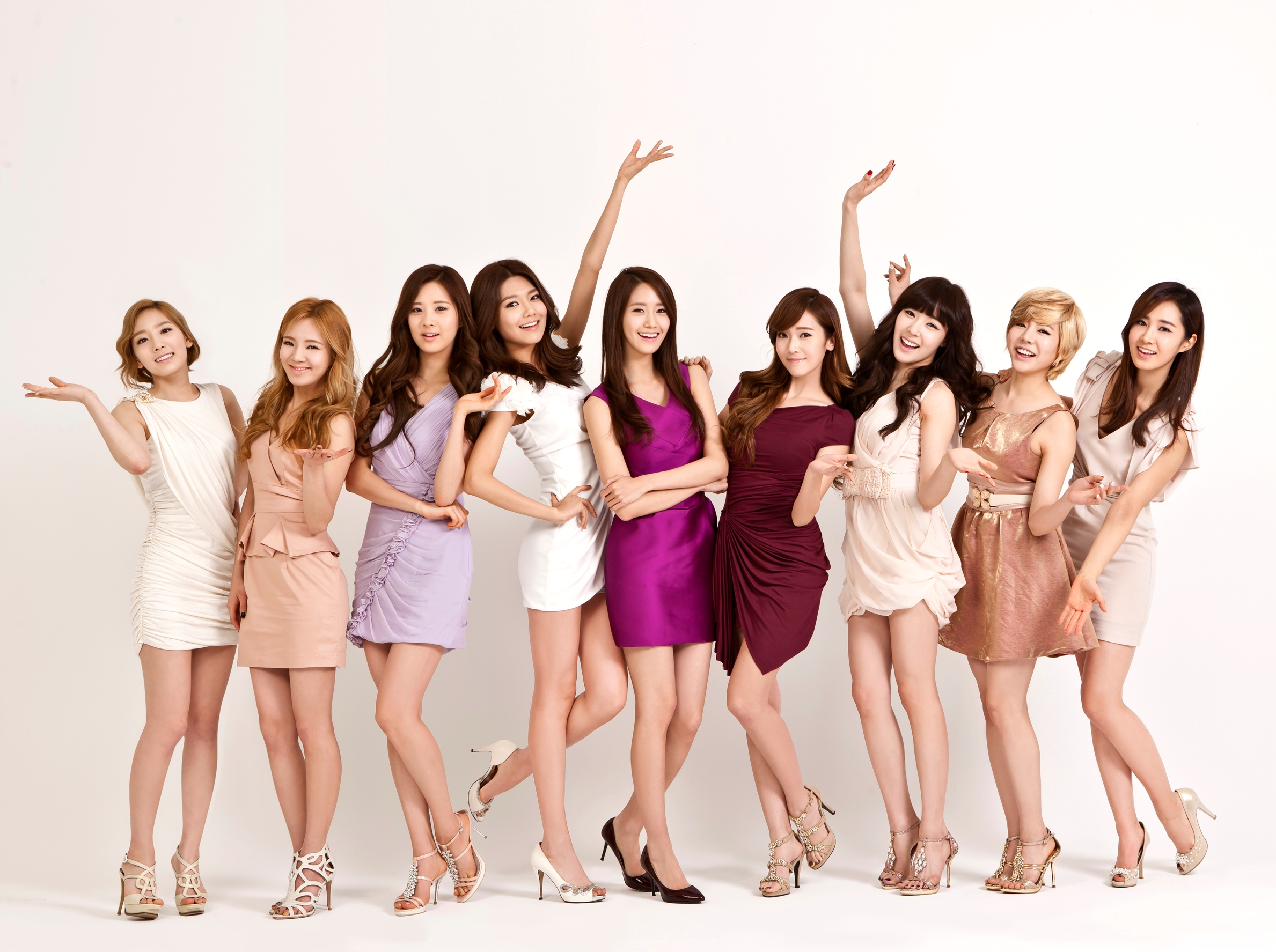
Pop group Girls' Generation in various styles of mini- and micro-mini dresses. South Korea, 2012.

A BBC article in 2014 wrote that miniskirts remained as contemporary a garment as ever, retaining their associations with youth. In an early 2010s study the department store Debenhams found that women continued buying miniskirts up to the age of 40, whilst 1983 studies showed that 33 years old was when the average woman had stopped buying them. Debenhams' report concluded that by the 2020s, miniskirts would be seen as a wardrobe staple for British women in their 40s and early 50s.

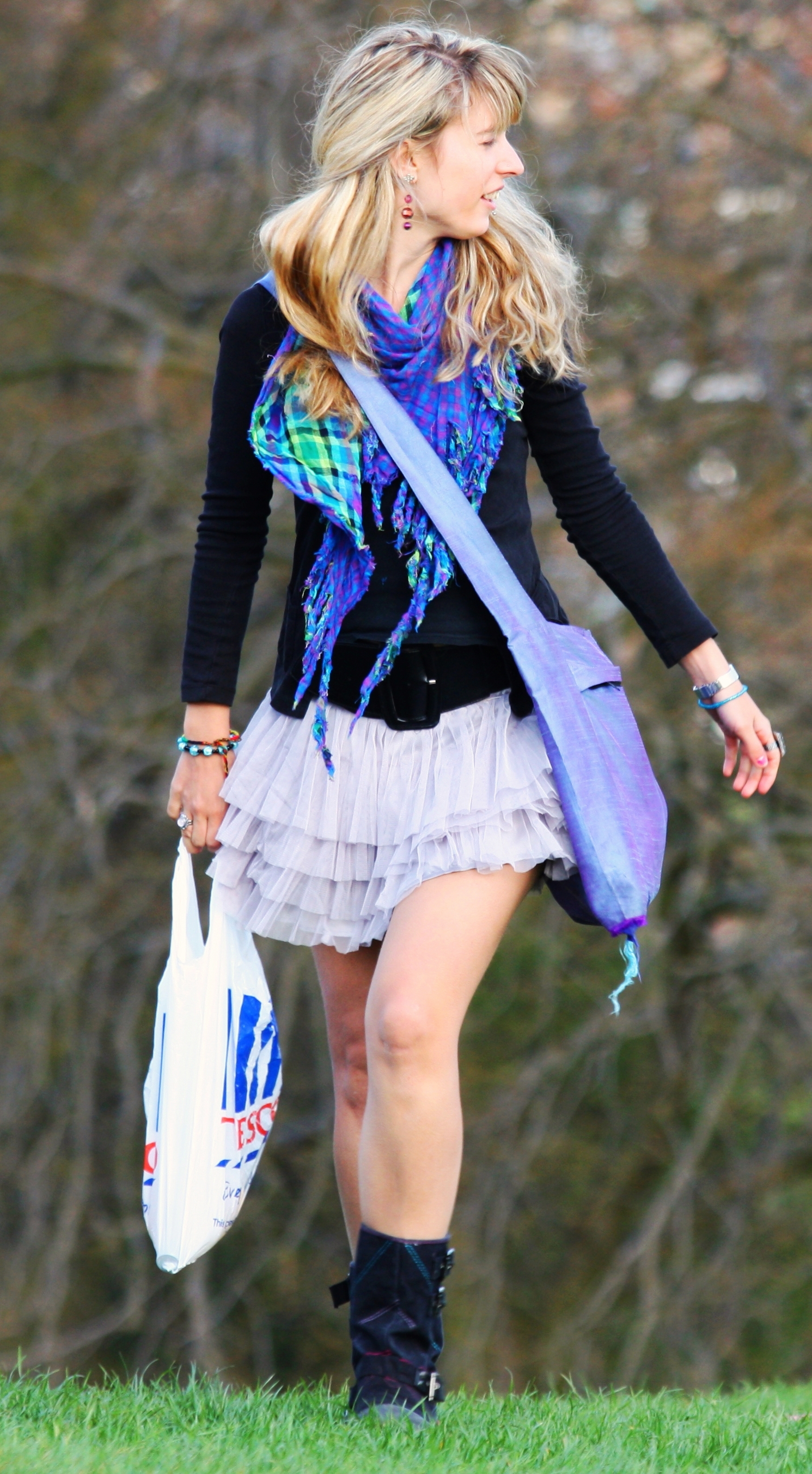
A woman wearing a rah-rah skirt in the United Kingdom, c.2010.

Despite this, in the early 21st century, miniskirts are still seen as controversial, and remain subject to bans and regulation. Valerie Steele told the BBC in 2014 that even though miniskirts no longer had the power to shock in most Western cultures, she would hesitate to wear one in most parts of the world. She described the garment as symbolic of looking forward to future freedom and backwards to a "much more restricted past" and noted that international rises in extreme conservatism and religious fundamentalism had led to an anti-women backlash, some of which was shown through censure and criticism of women wearing "immodest" clothing. In 2010, the mayor of Castellammare di Stabia in Italy ordered that police fine women for wearing "very short" miniskirts. In the 2000s, a ban on miniskirts at a teacher's college in Kemerovo was claimed by lawyers to be against the terms of equality and human rights as laid out by the Russian constitution, whilst in Chile, the women's minister, Carolina Schmidt, described a regional governor's ban on public employees wearing minis and strapless tops as "absolute nonsense" and challenged their right to regulate other people's clothing. In July 2010, Southampton city council also tried to regulate their female employees's wardrobes, telling them to avoid miniskirts and dress "appropriately". The South Korean government passed a law in March 2013 against "overexposure" that was described as a ban against miniskirts.

Miniskirts regularly appear in Africa as part of controversies, something that has continued since the 1960s. In the early 21st century alone, instances have included a proposed ban on miniskirts in Uganda justified by claiming that they were a dangerous distraction to drivers and would cause road accidents, and in 2004, a leaflet campaign in Mombasa instructed women to dress modestly and "shun miniskirts", leading to the Kenyan government denying that they wanted a ban. Since the 1990s, women perceived to be "indecently dressed" might be stripped in public often by gangs of men, but sometimes by other women. These acts took place in Kenya, Zambia and elsewhere, including incidents in Johannesburg in 2008 and 2011 which led to similar attacks in various states including Sudan, Malawi, Zimbabwe and elsewhere. The President of Malawi, Bingu wa Mutharika, was forced to make a statement in 2012 after male gangs forcibly stripped women in Lilongwe and Mzuzu. By this point, "miniskirt protests" regularly followed these acts of violence, with the protesters defiantly wearing miniskirts. In late February 2010, a group of about 200 Ugandan women demonstrated against a so-called "miniskirt law", an anti-pornography legislation which specifically forbade women to dress "in a manner designed to sexually excite", or from wearing clothing that revealed their thighs and/or other body parts. Uganda revisited their proposed ban in 2013, with Simon Lokodo, Minister of Ethics and Integrity, proposing another anti-pornography bill which would outlaw revealing "intimate parts", defined as "anything above the knee", and vowing that women who wore miniskirts would be arrested. While most of these proposed bans come from male politicians, in 2009, Joice Mujuru, Zimbabwe's vice president, had to deal with rumours that she intended to ban miniskirts and trousers for women. In Africa, one of the main issues with the miniskirt since the 1960s is that it is seen as representative of protest against predominantly male authority, an accusation also applied to trousers for women which are perceived as blurring the gender divide.

=== 2020s ===
The 2020s saw a resurgence of controversial early 2000s trends, including visible thong strings, low-rise jeans, and miniskirts, all of which were seen on fashion runways and social media platforms. The miniskirt's revival, evoked by nostalgia for Y2K pop icons like Britney Spears and Paris Hilton, inspired contemporary designs referencing the period. With brands like Miu Miu and Miaou, the micro miniskirt has made its way back into one of the top fashion trends. The micro mini made its emergence during Paris fashion week across catwalks and street style. Fashion brands like Khaite and Etro are capitalizing on the micro mini skirt trend, driven by customers' nostalgia and desire for a return to sexier styles.

During Spring/Summer 22, Miu Miu debuted a microskirt, inspired by the classic schoolgirl pleated skirt. The microskirt featured a low rise and extreme shortness which fostered virality across social media. It was seen on celebrities such as Nicole Kidman, Paloma Elsesser, and Zendaya.

The Diesel belt skirt debuted in Diesel's FW22 show in Milan, with leather belts transformed into micro-mini skirts. The belt is another take on the current micro mini skirt trend referencing Paris Hilton's iconic quote "skirts should be the size of a belt". Inspired by the chunky, low-waisted belts of the 1990s, Diesel's creative director Glenn Martens envisioned a garment that exudes a nostalgic yet contemporary vibe. A TikTok review by content creator Adrienne Reau, garnering 5.2 million views, has sparked controversy over the skirt design. The Daily Mail labeled it "sloppy", while Insider noted its impracticality, stating it's impossible to sit in. Diet Prada added humor, questioning if wearers were "ready to expose [their] buttcheeks to the breeze".

Critics express concerns over its impracticality due to its extremely short length, while its predominantly showcasing on slender models has prompted calls for more size-inclusive offerings. Miu Miu's presentation of the skirt solely on slim young bodies further fueled these criticisms, although subsequent magazine covers featuring plus-sized model Paloma Elsesser and 54-year-old actress Nicole Kidman helped broaden its appeal to a wider audience. Model Jessica Blair highlighted in a TikTok video how clothing options for plus-size individuals were severely limited in the early 2000s, effectively excluding them from fashion. "Clothing options for plus-size people in the early 2000s were virtually non-existent, thereby completely excluding fat people from fashion", Blair stated.

== Images ==
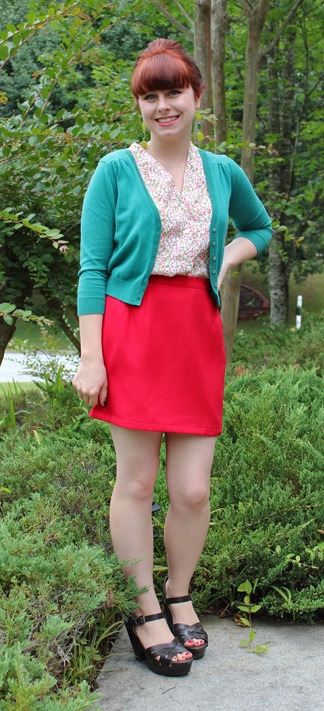
Woman wearing a red miniskirt

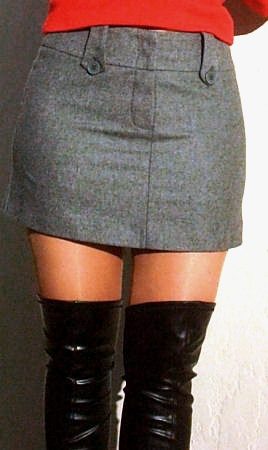

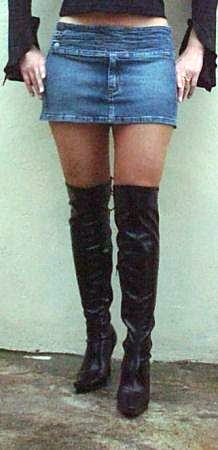
A woman in a jean-microskirt, c. 2006

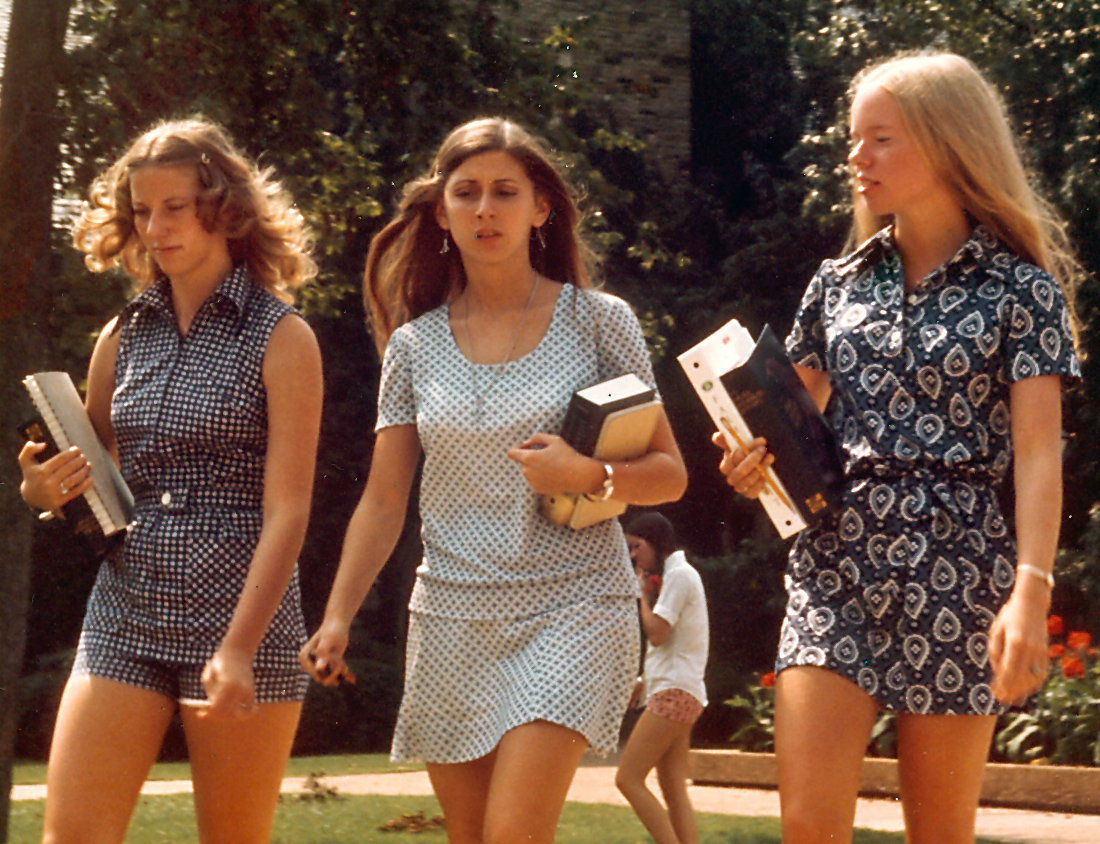
College girls, 1973 in Memphis.

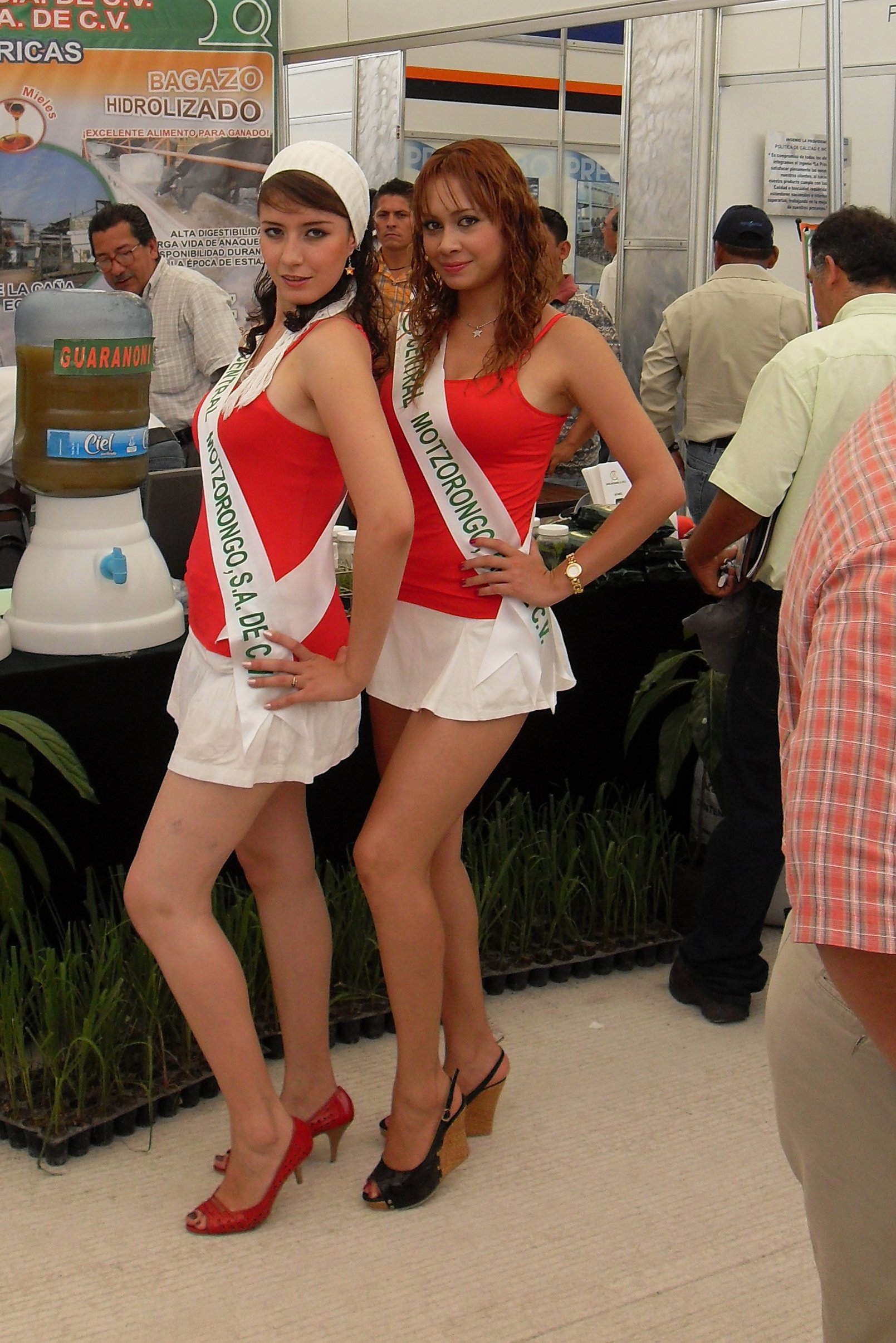
2 models in miniskirts on the ATAM convention in Córdoba, Mexico in 2009.

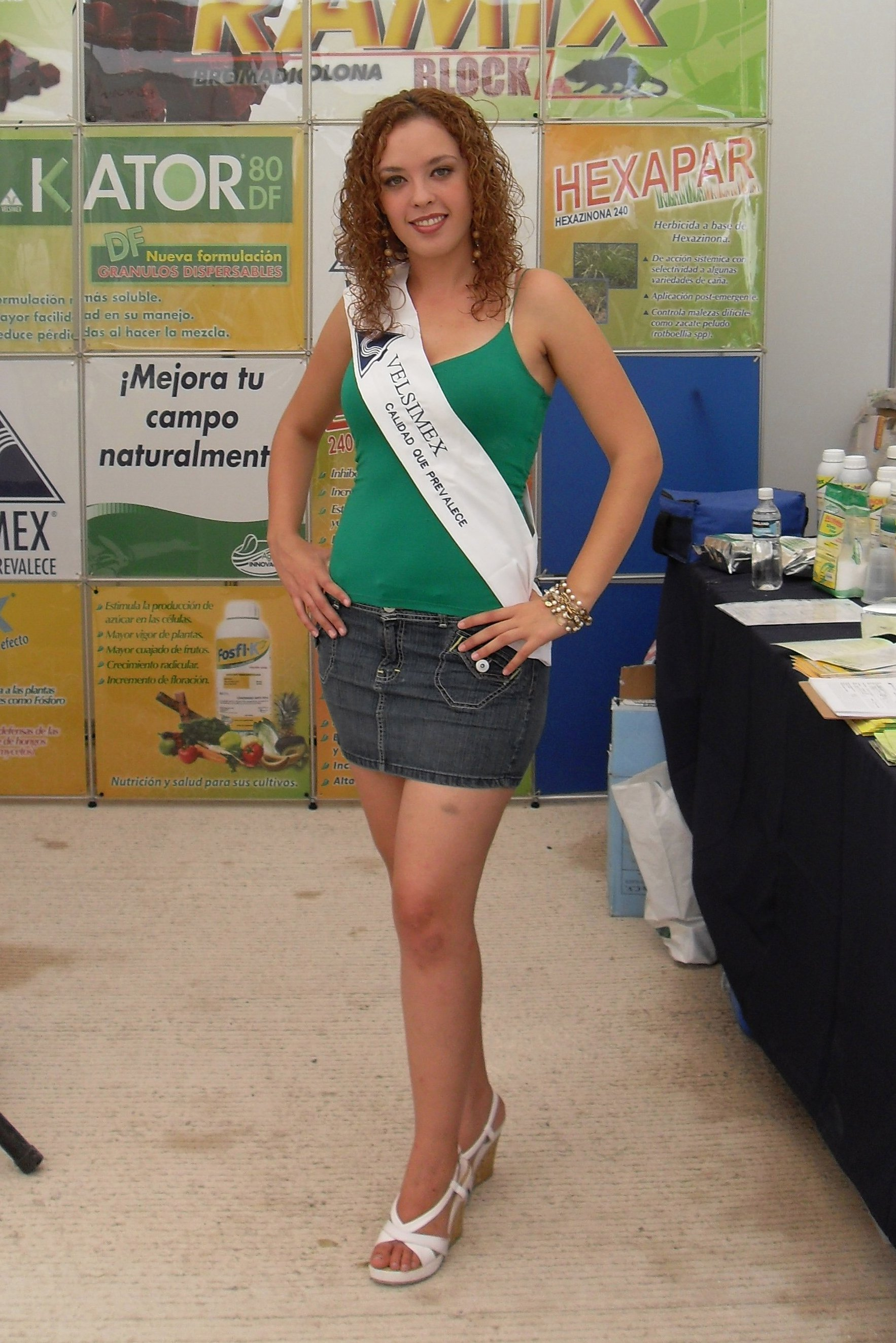
Model at the ATAM convention in Córdoba, Veracruz, Mexico.

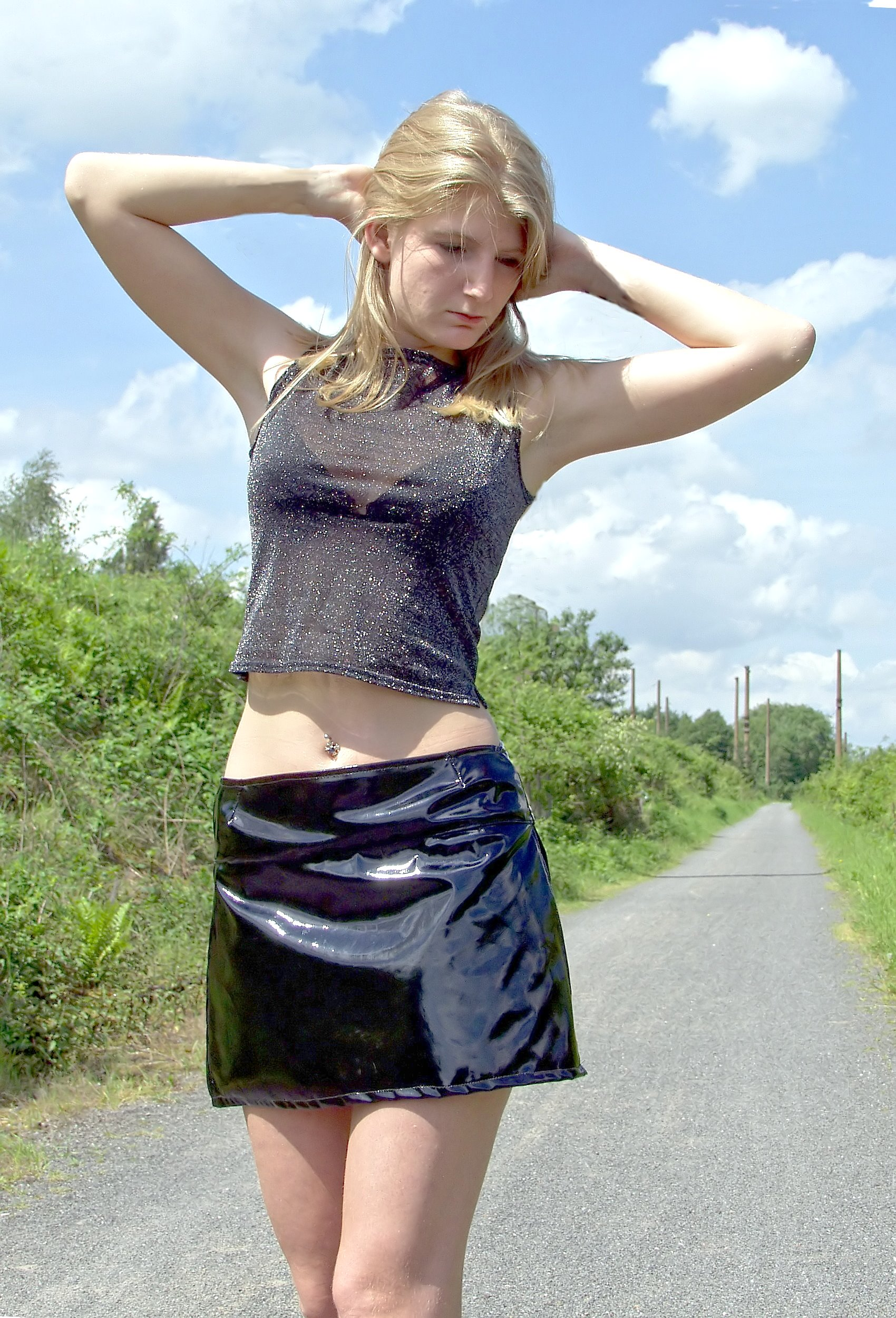
Photomodel in a black leathered miniskirt at Landschaftspark Duisburg-Nord.

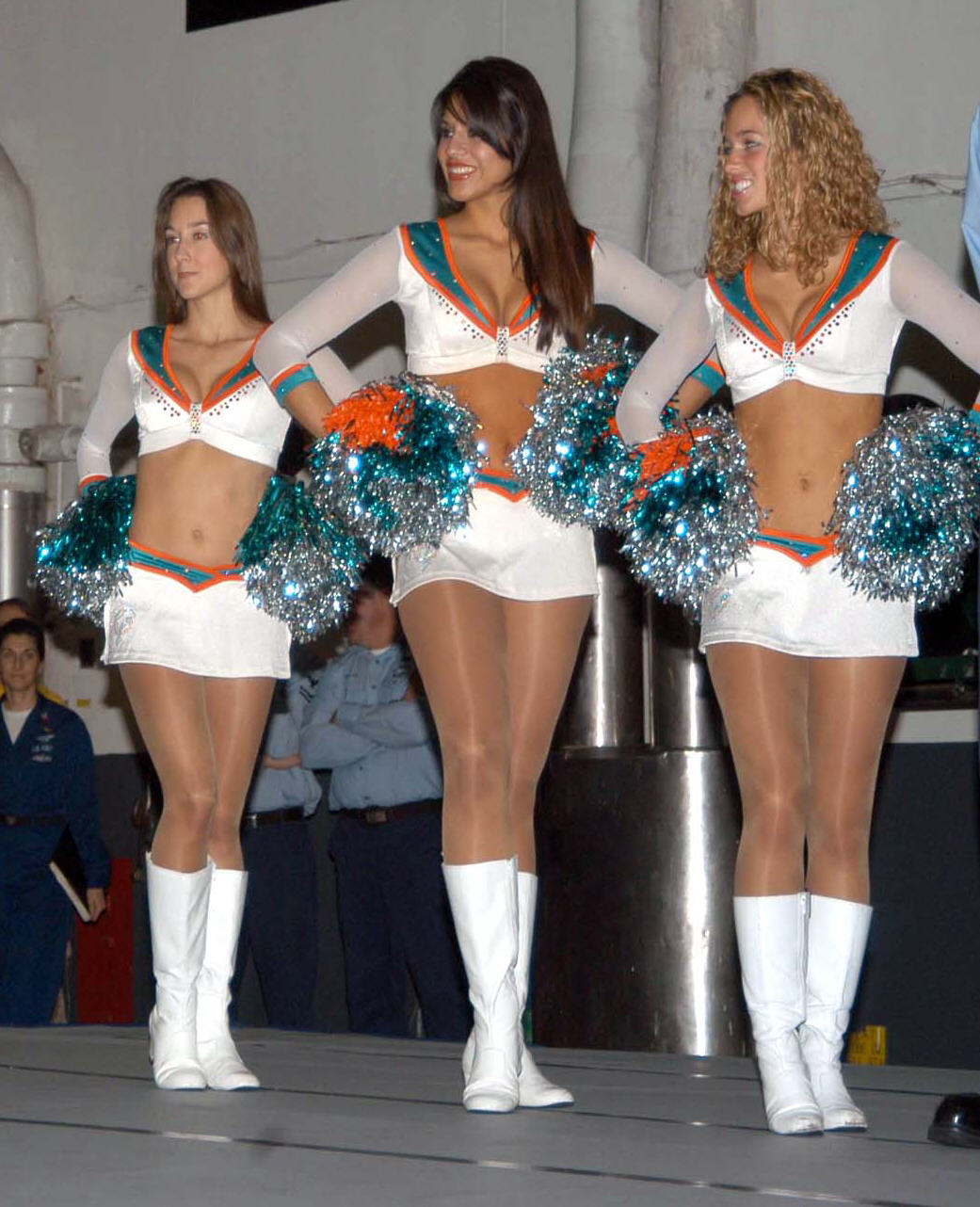
Members of the Miami Dolphins cheerleading team, c. 2004

== See also ==
- Hotpants
