= Oyme =

Russian folk music band

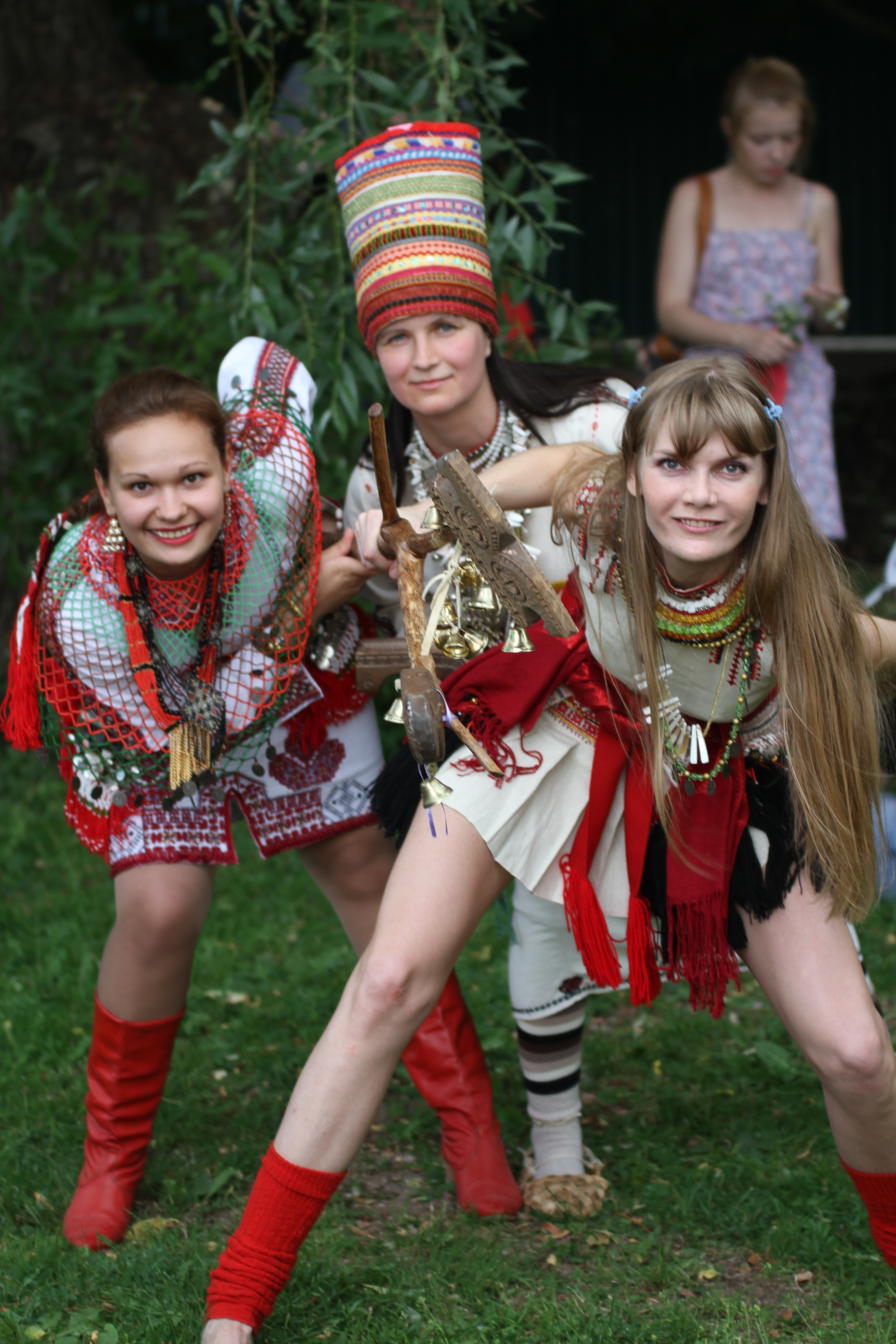
- The female vocalists of Oyme

Background information
- Origin: Moscow, Russia
- Genres: Folk, world music
- Years active: 2011–present
- Members: Ezhevika Spirkina (lead vocals) Larisa Zybkina (vocals); Ksenia Kudinova (vocals); Anastasia Kosova (vocals); Vladislav Oskolkov (violin) Ilya Yagoda (drums/percussion)
- Website: oyme.ru

Oyme (Erzya: Ойме, lit. 'soul') is a Russian folk music band, playing traditional music of the Erzya and Moksha and other Finno-Ugric peoples (and, since late 2010s, also the music of the peoples of Dagestan).

The sound of Oyme is primarily based on the polyphonic female singing (mostly in Erzya language, but other Finno-Ugric and Northeast Caucasian languages are used as well). The band members are ethnomusicologists and musicians specialising in the traditional singing techniques and traditional music instruments. A more modern, electronic kind of sound is also used on some tracks. Based on their own field trips to villages with ethnic populations, they reconstruct folk celebrations and rituals, traditional musical instruments, and national costumes. Their live performances typically evolve into an interactive ritual that involves the audience, which is a characteristic feature of Oyme.

Oyme have performed on many festivals in various countries all over the world, most notably at the Rainforest World Music Festival in 2018, and at WOMEX in 2019. Their music is also used to announce fight entrances of MMA wrestler Vladimir Mineev.

== Discography ==
- Shtatol (2016)
- Mastorava vol. 1 (2023)

=== Videography ===
- Oyme's Song (2015, feat. Deep Forest)
- Vaya (2017)
- Horol Ebel (2019)
- Tyushtya's Song (2020)

=== Also appeared on ===
- Something Old, Something New... (2016) by Will Johns (featured on the track "Tears of a Butterfly")
- Evo Devo (2016) by Deep Forest (featured on the tracks "Simply Done" and "Oyme's Song")

== Awards ==
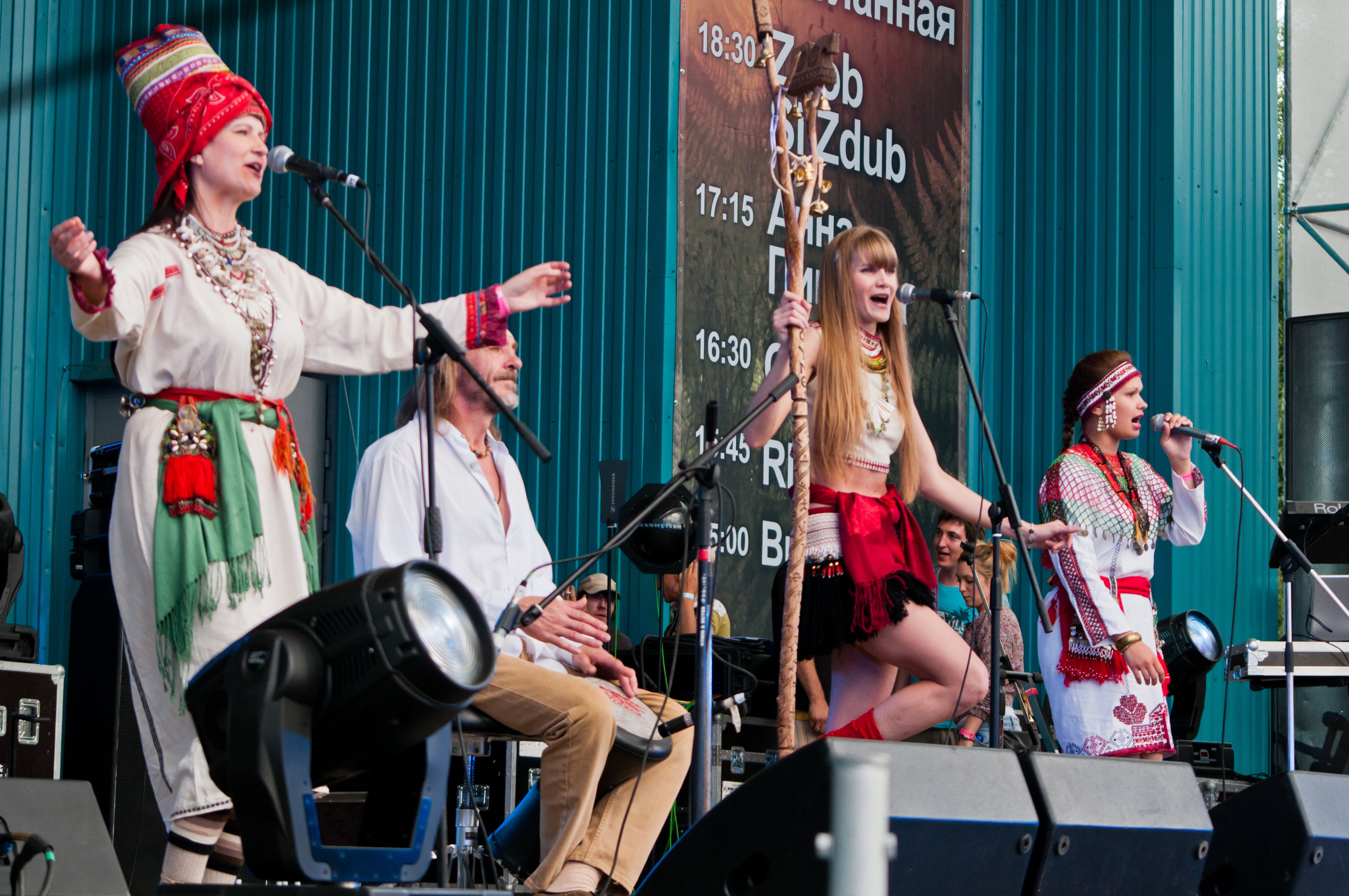
Oyme performing live at the Ivan Kupala fest

- The music video for "Vaya":
  - KlipFEST 2017: best artistic solution (winner), best female role (winner), best music video (laureate)
  - Best Russian music video of 2017 according to the Association of Music Critics of Russia
  - Winner of the Unsigned Only music competition in 2019 and 2020
- The 18th Independent Music Awards (IMAs) nominee ("Yehy Vaya" feat. Serge Bulat)

== Gallery ==
The "Tyushtya's Song" music video (2020)
