= Mordovian national costume =

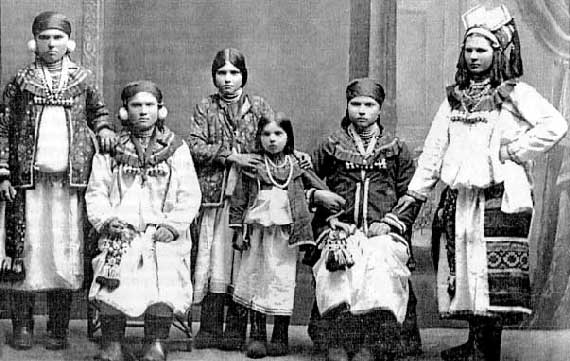
Moksha women 19th century

The Mordovian National Costume appeared in ancient times in peasant environments, and during that time it was endowed with characteristic features, such as particular cut, special cloth, ornaments and special decoration. The folk Mordovian costume, especially female, is very colorful. It is subdivided into Erzya and Moksha types. Most fabrics for making clothes were homemade. Erzya and Moksha folk costumes had reached their complete artistic expressiveness by the middle of the 19th century. The people, who worked on the land, could make fabrics themselves. They produced linen or stout canvas for hempen shirts, woolen cloth for warm clothes, brightly colored wool embroidery threads. They were painted using vegetable colorings. The most interesting is the women's clothing. It contains a lot of traditional features. Hand embroidery patterns has national symbols of ancient pagan beliefs.

== Moksha national costume ==
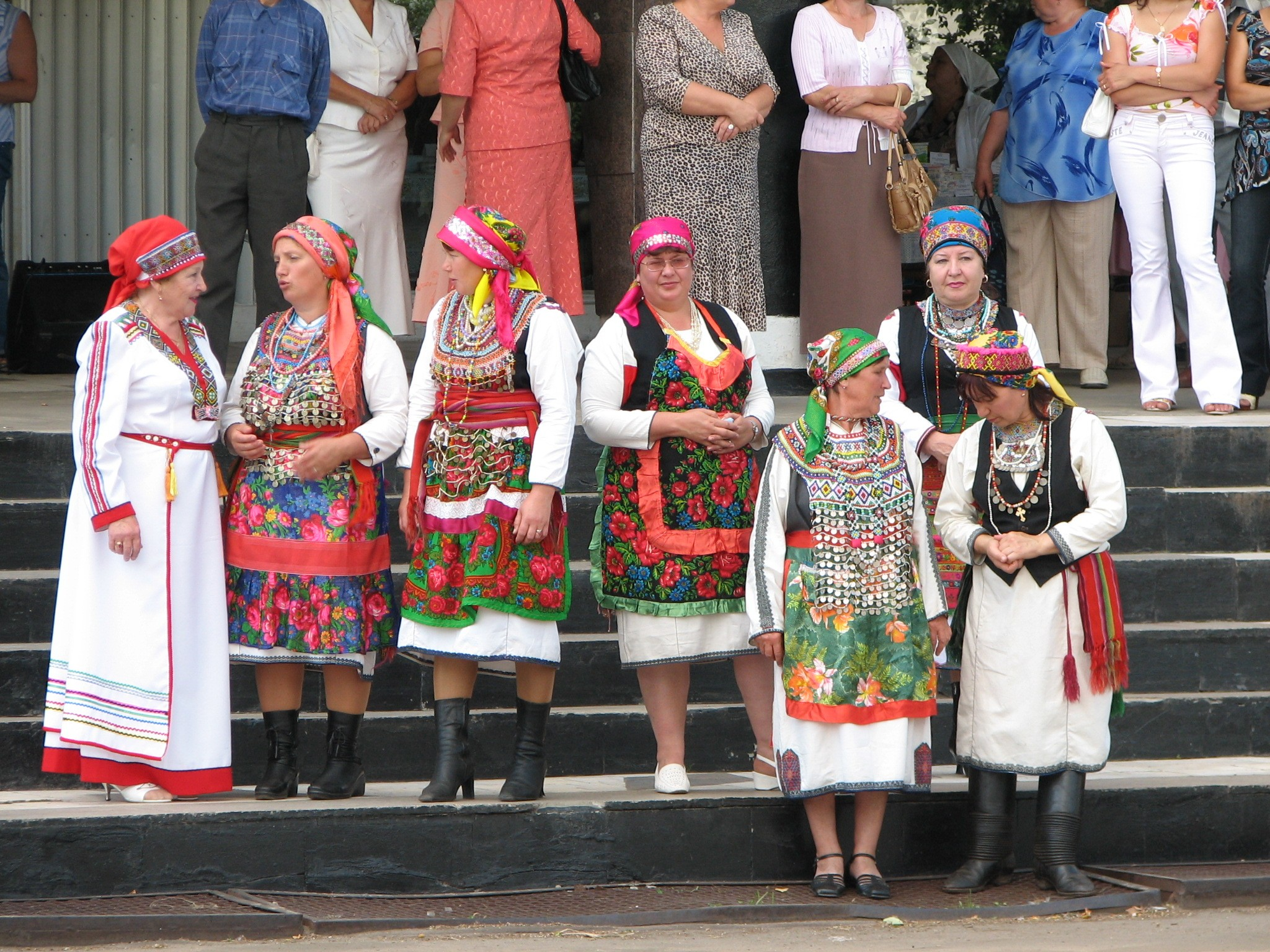
Moksha women in their national costumes

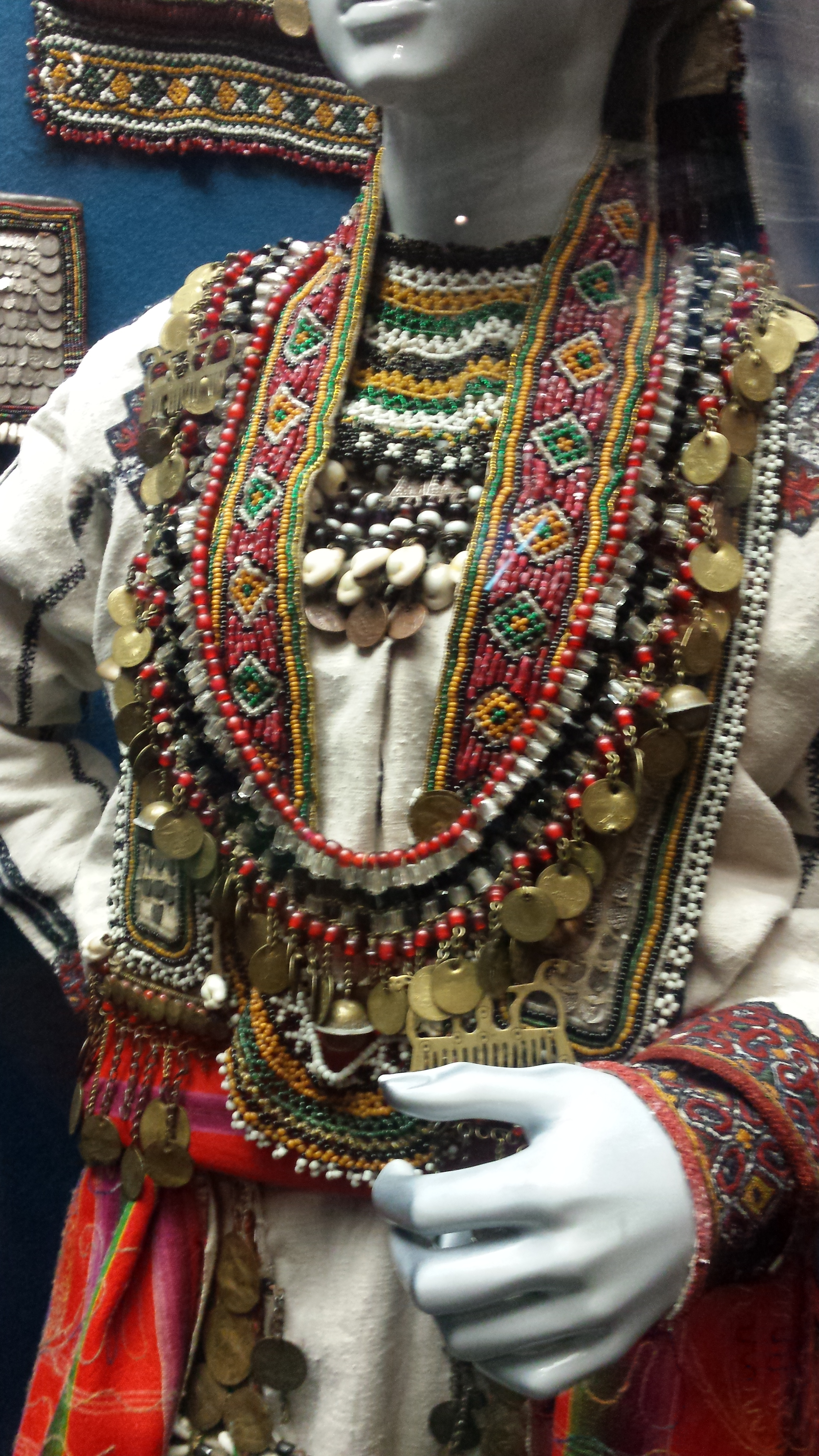
Outfit of the bride. Сhest decorations. Mordvins-moksha, Tambov province, Temnikov uezd, end of XIX - beg.XX centuries. 06

Moksha National Costume is very colorful. The main part of women’s costume is a white canvas "Panar-shirt", which is decorated with hand embroidery. According to the cut, characteristic of embroidery, ornament, and colour it is easy to identify the ethnic group a woman comes from. The cut of Moksha “panar-shirt” differs from the Erzya shirt. “Panar-shirt” is made from the bent in two linen panels. The sleeves are longer than those of Erzya shirts. The “Panar-shirt” has a deep low-neck. The traditional costume includes a dress put on over the blouse. There is a slit on the skirt in front. This type of cut in clothing was very popular among the people of the Volga region.

== Decorations ==
Chest decorations included several circles of necklaces. Special circular collars had a hard base which was covered with canvas and embroidered with glass beads, buttons and chains. Also there were reticular breast-collars made of red glass-beads and copper buttons. They finally matched perfectly with a huge embroidery of «panar» and «ruca». The Moksha women wore plenty of decorations on their hips. These decorations were made of shells, buttons and pendants. There were also special towels «kes-kolucjat» on hips. There could be 6 towels in one set. The footwear called «karht`» was made of bast. The bast shoes were criss-cross braided, with low sides and special loops. The Moksha women wrapped their legs around with white or black pieces of material called onuchi.

== Headwear ==
Women headwear varied greatly: head towels, headscarves etc. Mokshas headwear consisted of 2 or 3 parts and hair dress looked like horns. Headwear showed the age and marital status. It was decorated with glass beads and lines of spangles, laces or gallons. There was a pattern on the front side which looked like ideogram. Ancient Mordovian embroidery beadwork with coins, buttons, medals and cowry shells usually decorated a festive folk dress.

== Erzya national costume ==
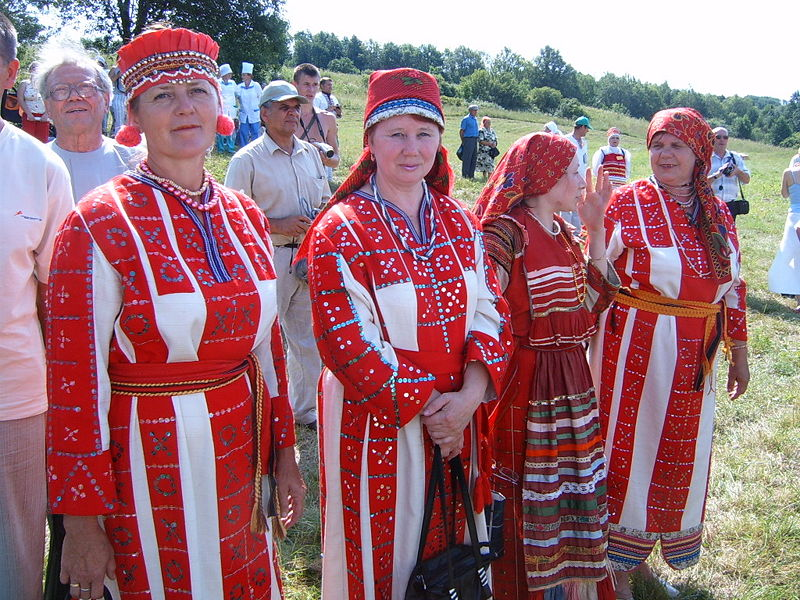
Erzya women in their national costumes

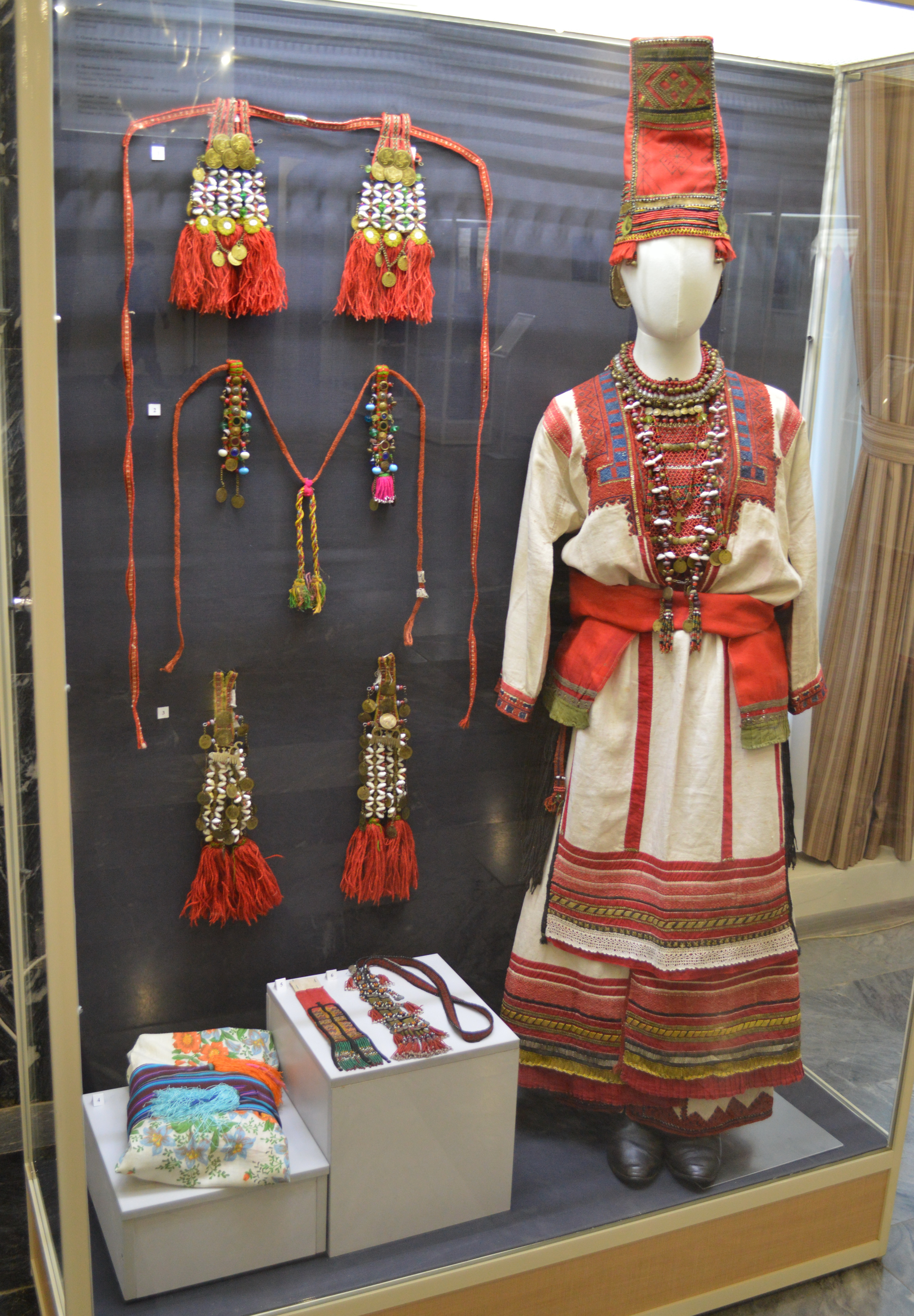
Erzya female holiday dress with pango headgear, late 19th century.

The main element in the Mordvinian costume was a white canvas shirt, decorated with embroidery. Erzya shirt is made from two cloths, which beaned in two. In the middle, at the central suture there was a seam left to slit for the collar and the slit on the hem for a step. In the side seams on the top at right angle there were sewed sleeves. Traditional chest fastener in the Erzya costume was «fibula syulgamo». It was an oval buckle made of thick wire with a movable pin which was used for chipping the collar. Rich lower part covered a deep chest slit. In the 19th century, the collar was usually fastened by two fibulas, one of which had no decoration. Complex belt elements played a particular importance in Mordovian women`s costumes. Costume was loincloth- pulay, which was worn over a shirt. As a sign of pubescence, girls begin to wear a pulay since 13–14 years old and then it remained the woman`s costume accessory until her death. Mordvinian woman could not appear in men society without a «pulay». Depending on the place of existence, it had a different form: square, trapeziform or as a belt with magnificent fringe. Holiday « pulay» was decorated with shells, chains, copper buttons, badges, colored beads and along the edge with long, black, red, green or blue wool and with tassels on each side. As a result, the weight of such a «pulaya» was up to 6 kilograms. Waist decoration «pulay» was of two types. The right side of the cloth was decorated with embroidery. Then, almost to knees there was a fringe from the wool, usually black, but on holidays it could be of red or green wool. Wool decorated with copper chains and on each side attached tassels of beads. Typical thing for Erzya costume was a canvas over clothes- “rutsya”. It was the clothing accessory of married women and had options for different situations in life and ritual. Over the shirt or rutsya they wore an apron – « ikelga patsya». It was tied low on the abdomen to close the hem of her shirt. In the complex adornments, which included several tiers of necklaces, especially distinguished original round collars on a firm basis covered with a canvas embroidered with rows of beads, buttons and chains. All of them perfectly matched with massive embroidery “rutsi”. The quality of clothing was defined by the type of embroidery. Spruce Erzya shirt was embroidered all along longitudinal stripes. Erzya embroidery was characterized by a beautiful carpet texture, borders and planes distinguished high relief. Although the ornament was pretty simple: rhombus, crosses and polylines. Decorating clothes women choose the best patterns – «sermat». In the old days they were the symbols of family belonging. Erzya women were endowed with a sense of proportion. Intuitively, without the knowledge of designing and modeling clothes, she sewed a masterpiece. Red and black vertical stripes on a white canvas looked noble. A wide belt, «pulay» with long black strands emphasized hips and women looked slimmer. Removable adornments –were an obligatory addition to the clothes. This is a necklace with different lengths and materials, beaded collars, fibula-syulgamo, badges and bells.

== Headdress ==
Like other nations, the Mordovians distinguished hats for girls and women. The girls most widespread type headdress was headband in the form of a hoop made of cardboard, covered with a cloth and decorated with embroidery, beads- pry syuks. Headband can be soft and decorated with paper flowers, bells and beads. Headdress- there were several types. They had cover the hair completely. Headdress was on a solid and square base- ‘ «pango». The basis was covered with red material and decorated with embroidery, beads and chains.

== Footwear ==
Traditional Mordovians footwear were bast shoes –kart` of lime or elm bast. For Mordovian bast shoes were characterized by slanting wickerwork, trapezoidal head and low edge. Holiday kind footwear was leather boots with pointed toes-kemt`. They were made of cow and calfskin leather. Boots had a massive back. In winter they wore gray and black, sometimes white valenki- felt boot . Legs were wrapped in 2 pairs of puttees; lower- pil`galga which wrapped around the foot. Outer- ver`ga praksta wrapped around the calves.

== Men ==
The main parts of a male costume was a shirt Erzi -"рanhard" and trousers -"ponskt". They were made of homespun canvas. In the summer men wore clothes made of canvas, like a bathrobe. In spring and autumn they wore "soumanou" representing the coat of black cloth or brown color.

== Headdress men ==
Men's headdress were hats black and white with a few areas. In the summer to work in a field they wore a canvas hood, in winter, it was earflapped fur hat which covered with cloth.

== Literature ==
1. Мордовский национальный костюм: Альбом/Сост.: Т.П. Прокина, М.И. Сурина.- Саранск: Мордовское книжное издательство, 1990.
