= Shoksha (disambiguation) =

Shoksha is an ethnographic group of Erzya people.

Shoksha may also refer to:

- Shoksha dialect spoken by Shoksha people
- Shoksha, Mordovia, village in Tengushevsky District, Mordovia, the namesake of Shoksha people
- Shoksha, Arkhangelsk Oblast
- Shoksha, Karelia, village in Prionezhsky District, Karelia
- Shoksha, Vologda Oblast
- Shoksha quartzite, quartzose sandstone, named after Shoksha, Karelia
