= Mordvins =

Official common term for Erzyas and Mokshas

Erzya and Moksha Mordvins
мордовский народ

Total population
- 806,000 (2010)

Regions with significant populations
- Russia: Mordovia 290,750 (2021): 484,450 (2021)

Languages
- Primarily Russian, also Erzya, Moksha

Religion
- Majority: Orthodox Christianity; Minority: Mordvin Native Religion; Molokans and Jumpers

Related ethnic groups
- Other Finno-Ugric peoples

Mordvins (also Mordvinians, Mordovians; Russian: мордва, romanized: Mordva, lit. 'Mordvins'; no equivalents in Moksha and Erzya) is an official term used in Russia and the Soviet Union to refer both to Erzyas and Mokshas since 1928.

== Names ==
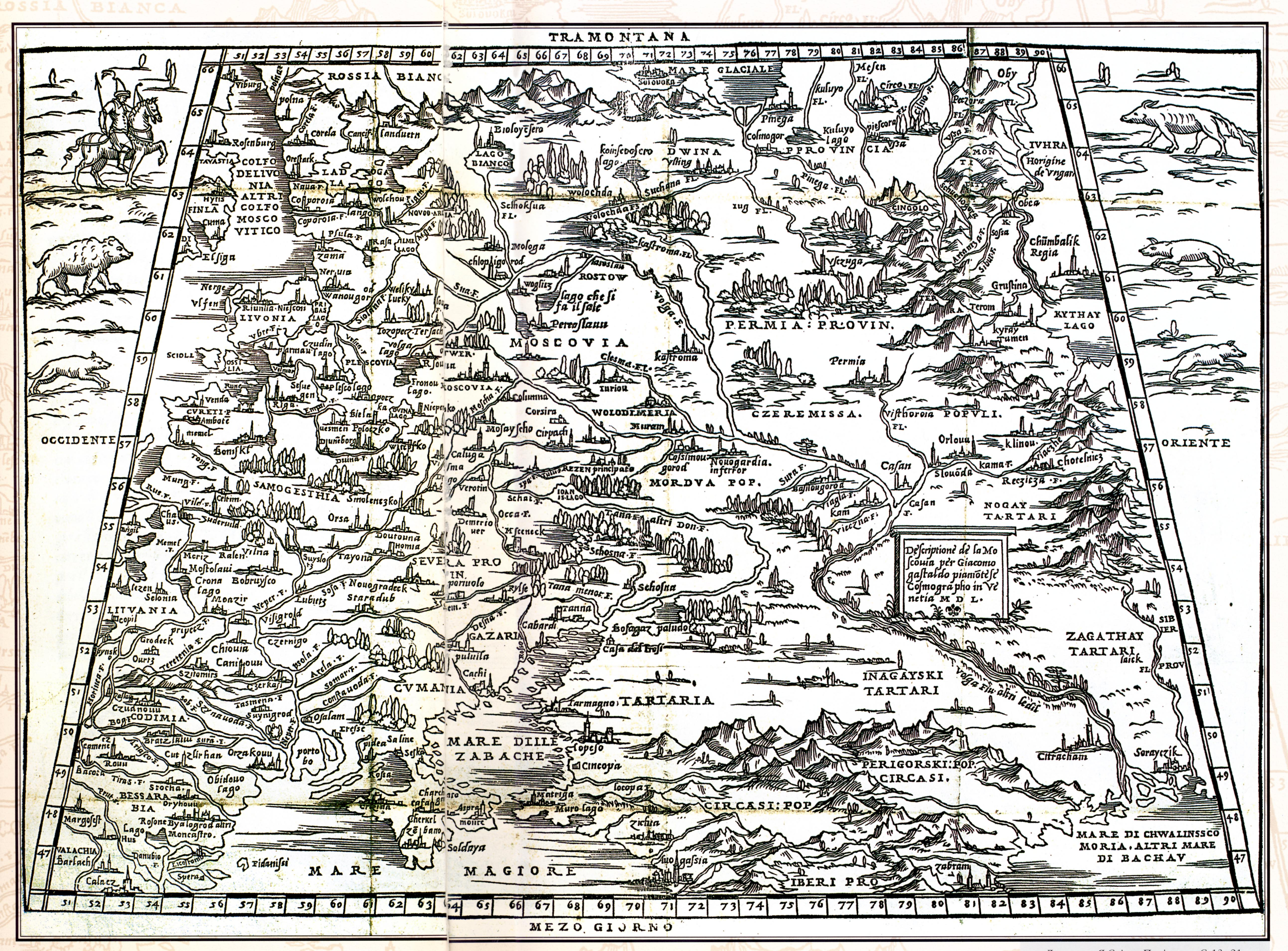
Mordva populi (Mordva people) shown on a 1550 map by Giacomo Gastaldi as residing south of Kasimov and Nizhny Novgorod

While Robert G. Latham had identified Mordva as a self-designation, identifying it as a variant of the name Mari, Aleksey Shakhmatov in the early 20th century noted that Mordva was not used as a self-designation by the two Mordvinic tribes of the Erzya and Moksha. Nikolai Mokshin again states that the term has been used by the people as an internal self-defining term to constitute their common origin. The linguist Gábor Zaicz underlines that the Mordvins do not use the name 'Mordvins' as a self-designation. Feoktistov wrote "So-called Tengushev Mordvins are Erzyans who speak the Erzyan dialect with Mokshan substratum and in fact they are an ethnic group of Erzyans usually referred to as Shokshas. It was the Erzyans who historically were referred to as Mordvins, and Mokshas usually were mentioned separately as "Mokshas". There is no evidence Mokshas and Erzyas were an ethnic unity in prehistory". Isabelle T. Keindler writes:

Gradually major differences developed in customs, language and even physical appearance (until their conversion to Christianity the Erzia and Moksha did not intermarry and even today intermarriage is rare.) The two subdivisions of Mordvinians share no folk heroes in common – their old folksongs sing only of local heroes. Neither language has a common term to designate either themselves or their language. When a speaker wishes to refer to Mordvinians as a whole, he must use the term "Erzia and Moksha"

=== Early references ===
The ethnonym Mordva is possibly attested in Jordanes' Getica in the form of Mordens who, he claims, were among the subjects of the Gothic king Ermanaric. A land called Mordia at a distance of ten days journey from the Petchenegs is mentioned in Constantine VII's De administrando imperio.

In medieval European sources, the names Merdas, Merdinis, Merdium, Mordani, Mordua, Morduinos have appeared. In the Russian Primary Chronicle, the ethnonyms Mordva and mordvichi first appeared in the 11th century. After the Mongol invasion of Rus', the name Mordvin rarely gets mentioned in Russian annals, and is only quoted after the Primary Chronicle up until the 15th–17th centuries.

=== Etymologies ===
The name Mordva is thought to originate from an Iranian (Scythian) word, mard, meaning "man" (Persian مرد). The Mordvin word mirde denoting a husband or spouse is traced to the same origin. This word is also probably related to the final syllable of "Udmurt", and also in Komi: mort and perhaps even in Mari: marij.

The first written mention of Erzya is considered to be in a letter dated to 968 AD, by Joseph, the Khazar khagan, in the form of arisa. More controversially, it is sometimes linked to the Aorsy and Alanorsi mentioned in the works of Strabo and Ptolemy. (However, the consensus view is that the Alans, a nomadic Iranian tribe from east Central Asia, were also known as the Aorsi/Alanorsi.) Estakhri, from the 10th century, has recorded among the three groups of the Rus people the al-arsanija, whose king lived in the town of Arsa. The people have sometimes been identified by scholars as Erzya, sometimes as the aru people, and also as Udmurts. It has been suggested by historians that the town Arsa may refer to either the modern Ryazan or Arsk In the 14th century, the name Erzya is considered to have been mentioned in the form of ardzhani by Rashid-al-Din Hamadani, and as rzjan by Jusuf, the Nogaj khan In Russian sources, the ethnonym Erza first appears in the 18th century.

=== Restoration of Erzya and Moksha ethnonyms ===
Mokshas from Alkino wrote a collective open letter to Literaturnaya Gazeta in 1991.

The authors of a letter sent to Literaturnaia Gazeta from the Moksha Alkino, Mordovia, call this ethnonym "a very nonsensical parasite-word," "a slur," "an awkward nickname" that can be blamed for the fact that "people have come to renounce their true origin, and have rushed in droves (especially the young people) to become Russians. And perhaps history may soon witness that sorry time when the world's civilization, in an instant, will lose forever two remarkable nationalities, and Mordovia will be nothing more than the term for an administrative territory.…"

On the First Erzya and Moksha Peoples' Congress in 1989 the first point of the Congress Declaration was renaming Mordovia to the Erzya and Moksha Autonomous Republic and banning the term Mordva.

== History ==
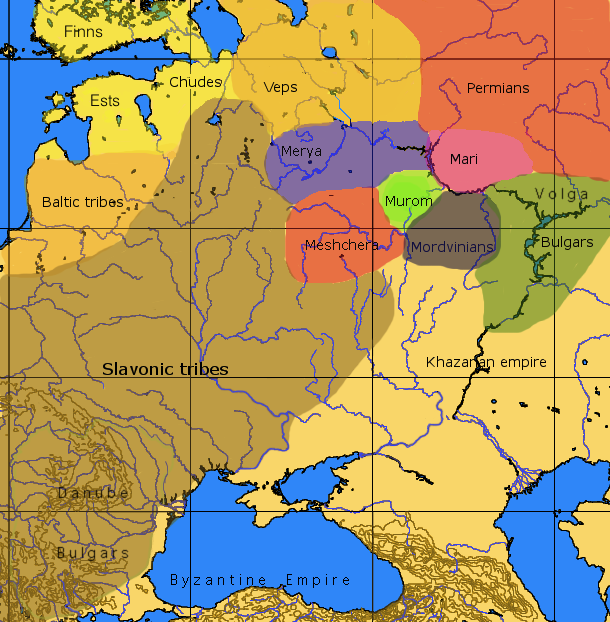
Eastern Europe c. 9th century Volga Finns Slavs Mordvins Khazars

=== Prehistory ===
Researchers have distinguished the ancestors of the Erzya and the Moksha from the mid-1st century AD by the different orientations of their burials and by elements of their costumes and by the variety of bronze jewelry found by archaeologists in their ancient cemeteries. The Erzya graves from this era were oriented north–south, while the Moksha graves were found to be oriented south–north.

=== Medieval and early modern history ===
The ancient Mordvins encountered the Bulgars around the 7th century and later on came under the influence of Volga Bulgaria, paying them tribute. In the 13th century, the Mongols conquered the region and the Mordvins were incorporated into the Golden Horde. In the late 14th century, the Principality of Moscow conquered much of the western Mordvin lands while the eastern portion was under the control of the Kazan Khanate. After Russia conquered the Kazan Khanate in 1552, all the Mordvins became Russian subjects. During Russian rule, the Mordvins experienced forced conversions to Christianity, displacement, migration out the region and the influx of Russian settlers to Mordvin lands, a process that led to them becoming a minority in the area.

In the 17th century, the Mordvins, Chuvash, and Mari staged a rebellion against Russian rule. After being suppressed, many Mordvins fled out of the area to escape reprisal and headed eastward past the Volga to more remote areas with weak Russian influence. Meanwhile the Mordvins that stayed eventually became serfs under the Russians, with the local economy being tied to agriculture. Failed rebellions would sporadically occur due to the working conditions the Mordvins were under. The Mordvins began rapidly assimilating to Russian culture until the emergence of Mordvin nationalism in the late 19th century.

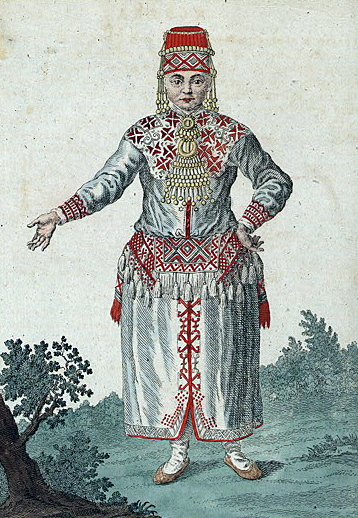
Mordovian woman, 1781

=== Modern history ===
Although the Mordvins were given an autonomous territory as a titular nation within the Soviet Union in 1928, Russification intensified during the 1930s, and knowledge of the Mordvin languages by the 1950s was in rapid decline.

After the fall of the Soviet Union, the Mordvins, like other indigenous peoples of Russia, experienced a rise in national consciousness. Aleksandr Sharonov compiled the Erzya national epic called Mastorava, which stands for "Mother Earth", first published in 1994 in the Erzya language (it has since been translated into Moksha and Russian). Mastorava is also the name of a movement of Mordvin national revival founded by Dmitri Nadkin of the Mordovian State University and others.

The first All-Russian Congress of the Mordvins (March 1992) demanded, among other things, constitutional recognition of Erzya and Moksha languages as the state ones, as well as the restoration of these languages as language of instruction, first, in primary schools, and then expanded into secondary schools. The congress elected the Revival Council. The Council was split due to various contradictions, one of them being whether the Mordvin language should be unified or Moksha and Erzya must continue their development separately.

== Languages ==
The Mordvinic languages, a subgroup of the Uralic family, are Erzya and Moksha, with about 275,000 native speakers together. Both are official languages of Mordovia alongside Russian. The medieval Meshcherian language may have been Mordvinic, or close to Mordvinic. Erzya is spoken in the northern and eastern and north-western parts of Mordovia, as well as in the adjacent oblasts of Nizhny Novgorod, Penza, Samara, Saratov, Orenburg, and Ulyanovsk, and in the republics of Chuvashia, Tatarstan, and Bashkortostan. Moksha is the majority language in the western part of Mordovia.

Due to differences in phonology, lexicon, and grammar, Erzya and Moksha are not mutually intelligible, to the extent that the Russian language is often used for intergroup communications. The two Mordvinic languages also have separate literary forms. The Erzya literary language was standardised in 1922 and the Mokshan in 1923. Both are currently written using the standard Russian alphabet.

=== Reconstruction of Mordvin language ===
The Moksha and Erzya languages are closely related, therefore they are thought to share a common ancestry. As to the degree of the languages' proximity, Arnaud Fournet presumes that if Moksha and Erzya had been a single language, they started to diverge 1500 years ago—the same time as French and Italian divided. Serebrenikov proves that Moksha preserves more archaic forms than those existing in Erzya.

=== Classification ===
Until ca. 2010s most Finnic linguists considered Mordvinic and Mari languages as a single subdivision of the so-called Volga-Finnic branch of the Uralic family. Currently, this approach is rejected by most scholars, and Mordvinic and Mari are considered distinct from each other: Mordvinic languages are believed to have a common ancestor with Balto-Finnic languages (Estonian and Finnish), while the Mari languages are closer to the Permic languages.

== Ethnic structure ==
Flag of the Erzya people

Flag of the Moksha people

The Mordvins are divided into two ethnic subgroups and three further subgroups:

- the Erzya people or Erzyans, (Erzya: Эрзят/Erzyat), speakers of the Erzya language. Less than half of the Erzyans live in the autonomous republic of Mordovia, Russian Federation, Sura River and Volga River. The rest are scattered over the Russian oblasts of Samara, Penza, Orenburg, as well as Tatarstan, Chuvashia, Bashkortostan, Siberia, Far East, Armenia and USA.
- the Moksha people or Mokshans, (Moksha: Мокшет/Mokshet), speakers of the Moksha language. Less than half of the Moksha population live in the autonomous republic of Mordovia, Russian Federation, in the basin of the Volga River. The rest are scattered over the Russian oblasts of Samara, Penza, Orenburg, as well as Tatarstan, Siberia, Far East, Armenia, Estonia, Australia and USA.
- the Shoksha or Tengushevo Mordvins constitute a transitional group between the Erzya and Moksha people and live in the Tengushevsky and Torbeevsky districts of Republic of Mordovia.
- the Karatai Mordvins or Qaratays live in the Republic of Tatarstan. They no longer speak a Volga-Finnic language but have assimilated with Tatars.
- the Teryukhan Mordvins live near Nizhny Novgorod had been completely Russified by 1900 and today unambiguously identify as ethnic Russians.

Mokshin concludes that the above grouping does not represent subdivisions of equal ethnotaxonomic order, and discounts Shoksha, Karatai and Teryukhan as ethnonyms, identifying two Mordvin sub-ethnicities, the Erzya and the Moksha, and two "ethnographic groups", the Shoksha and the Karatai.

Two further formerly Mordvinic groups have assimilated to (Slavic and Turkic) superstrate influence:

- The Meshcheryaks are believed to be Mordvins who have converted to Russian Orthodox Christianity and have adopted the Russian language.
- The Mishars are believed to be Mordvins who came under Tatar influence and adopted the language (Mishar Tatar dialect) and the Sunni Muslim religion. This however is only one theory; there is no consensus on the subject of Mishar ethnogenesis and some have heavily criticized given version.

== Demographics ==
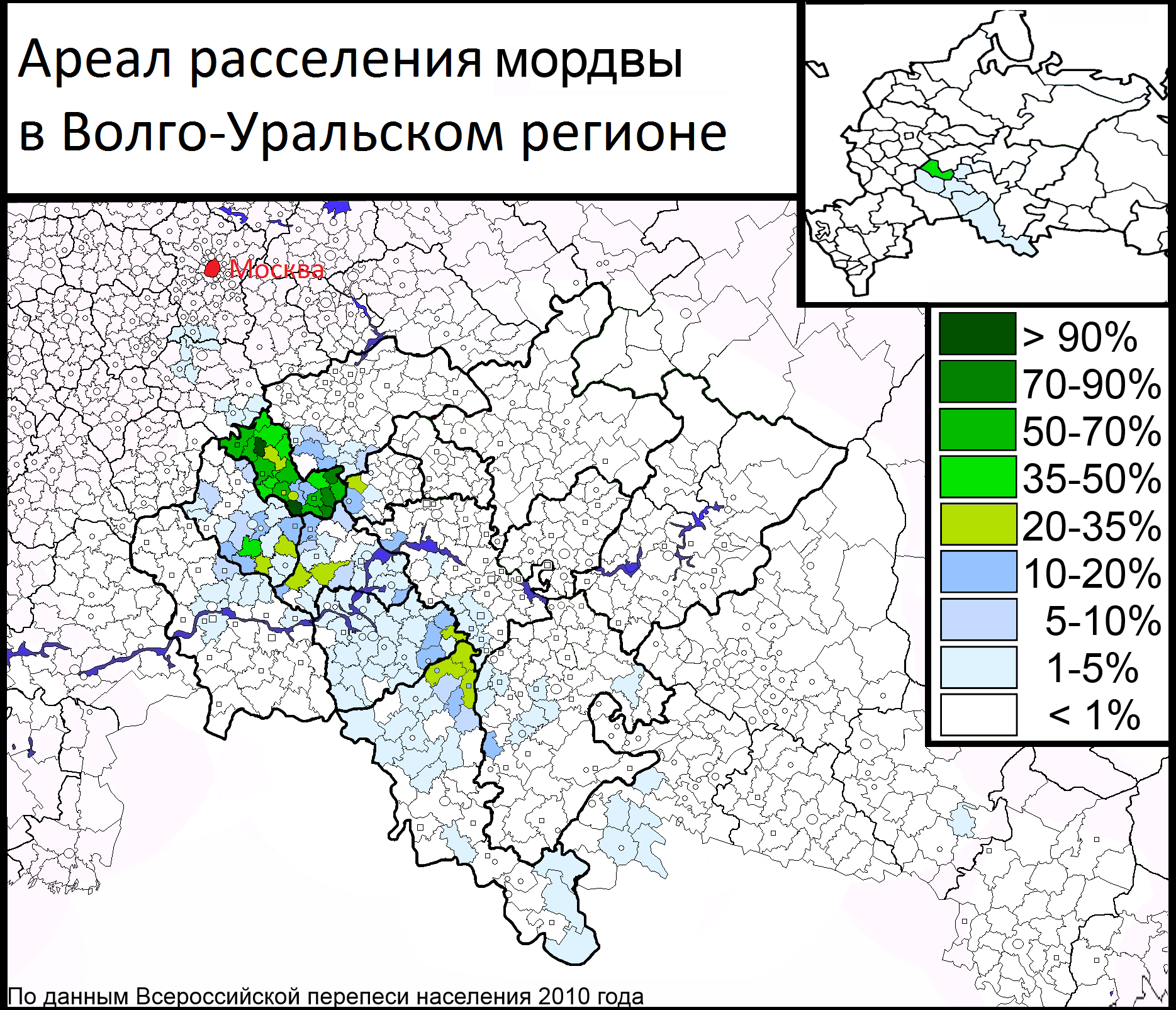
Mordvins in the Volga-Urals region (2010 Russian census)

Latham (1854) quoted a total population of 480,000. The 1979 Soviet census reported 1.2 million. Mastyugina (1996) quotes 1.15 million. The 2002 Russian census reports 0.84 million.

According to estimates by Tartu University made in the late 1970s, less than one third of Mordvins lived in the autonomous republic of Mordovia, in the basin of the Volga River.

Others are scattered (2002) over the Russian oblasts of Samara (116,475), Penza (86,370), Orenburg (68,880) and Nizhni Novgorod (36,705), Ulyanovsk (61,100), Saratov (23,380), Moscow (22,850), Tatarstan (28,860), Chuvashia (18,686), Bashkortostan (31,932), Siberia (65,650), Russian Far East (29,265).

Populations in parts of the former Soviet Union not now part of Russia are: Kyrgyz Republic 5,390, Turkmenistan 3,490, Uzbekistan 14,175, Kazakhstan, (34,370), Azerbaijan (1,150), Estonia (985), Armenia (920).

Mordvins in Russia (1926–2021)
Census	1926	1939	1959	1970	1979	1989	2002	2010	2021
Population	1,306,798	1,375,558	1,211,105	1,177,492	1,111,075	1,072,939	843,350	744,237	484,450
Percentage	1.41%	1.27%	1.03%	0.91%	0.81%	0.73%	0.59%	0.54%	0.37%

== Cultures, folklores and mythologies ==
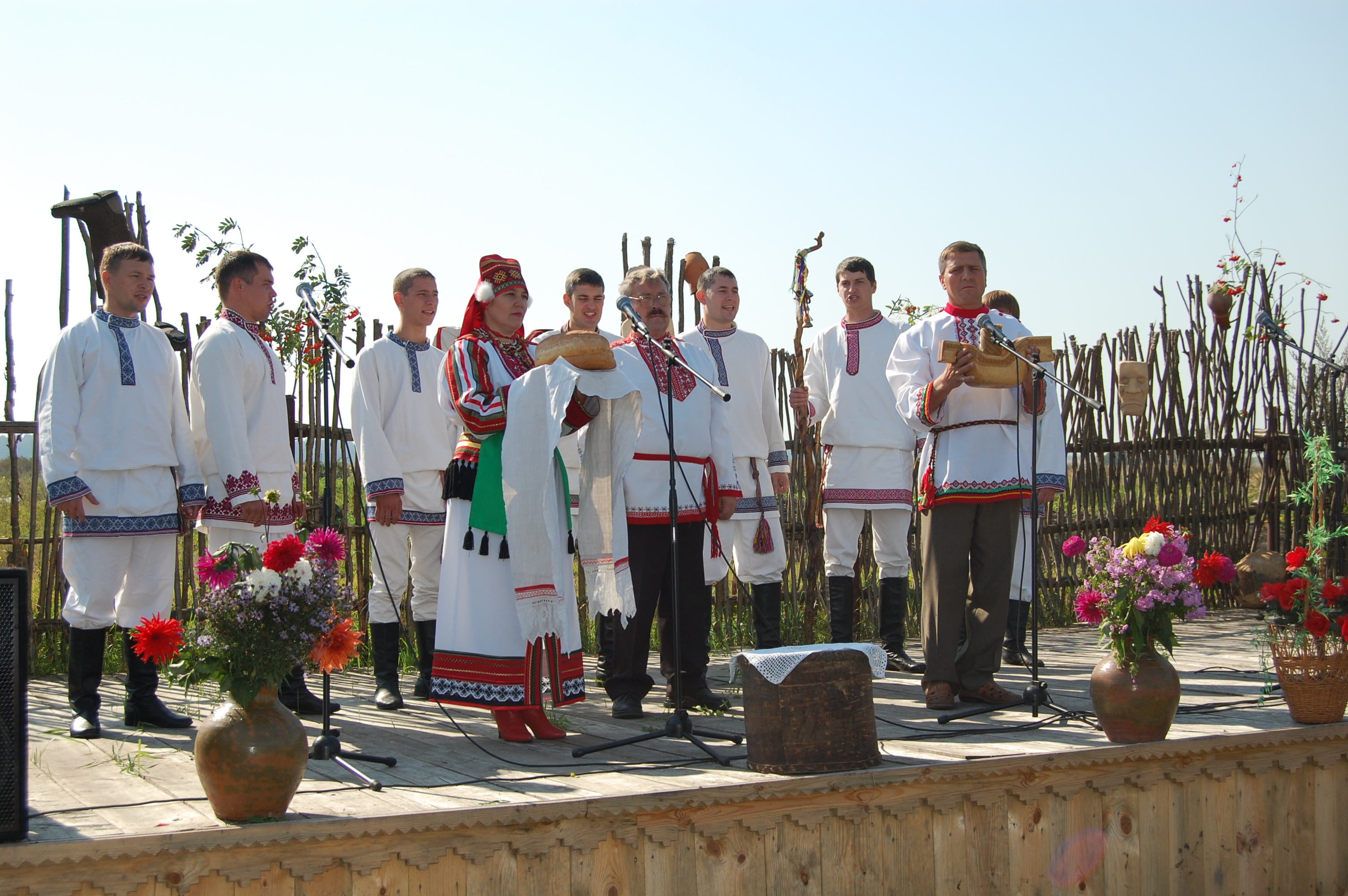
An Erzya ritual performance in Podlesnaya Tavla, Mordovia

According to Tatiana Deviatkina, although sharing some similarities, no common Mordvin mythology has emerged, and therefore the Erza and Moksha mythologies are defined separately.

In the Erzya mythology, the superior deities were hatched from an egg. The mother of gods is called Ange Patiai, followed by the Sun God, Chipaz, who gave birth to Nishkepaz; to the earth god, Mastoron kirdi; and to the wind god, Varmanpaz. From the union of Chipaz and the Harvest Mother, Norovava, was born the god of the underworld, Mastorpaz. The thunder god, Pur'ginepaz, was born from Niskende Teitert, (the daughter of the mother of gods, Ange Patiai). The creation of the Earth is followed by the creation of the Sun, the Moon, humankind, and the Erza. Humans were created by Chipaz, the sun god, who, in one version, molded humankind from clay, while in another version, from soil.

In Moksha mythology, the Supreme God is called Viarde Skai. According to the legends, the creation of the world went through several stages: first the Devil moistened the building material in his mouth and spat it out. The piece that was spat out grew into a plain, which was modeled unevenly, creating the chasms and the mountains. The first humans created by Viarde Skai could live for 700–800 years and were giants of 99 archinnes. The underworld in Mokshan mythology was ruled by Mastoratia.

Latham reported strong pagan elements surviving Christianization. The 1911 Britannica noted how the Mordvins:

… still preserve much of their own mythology, which they have adapted to the Christian religion. According to some authorities, they have preserved also, especially the less russified Moksha, the practice of kidnapping brides, with the usual battles between the party of the bridegroom and that of the family of the bride. The worship of trees, water (especially of the water-divinity which favours marriage), the sun or Shkay, who is the chief divinity, the moon, the thunder and the frost, and of the home-divinity Kardaz-scrko still exists among them; and a small stone altar or flat stone covering a small pit to receive the blood of slaughtered animals can be found in many houses. Their burial customs seem founded on ancestor-worship. On the fortieth day after the death of a kinsman the dead [one] is not only supposed to return home, but a member of his household represents him, and, coming from the grave, speaks in his name... They are also masters of apiculture, and the commonwealth of bees often appears in their poetry and religious beliefs. They have a considerable literature of popular songs and legends, some of them recounting the doings of a king Tushtyan who lived in the time of Ivan the Terrible.

=== Religion ===
Erzya practices Christianity (Eastern Orthodox and Lutheranism brought by Finnish missionaries in the 1990s) and a native religion.

== National representative bodies ==
On 1 May 2020 the Aťań Eźem approved new system of national representative bodies. Statute on creation and functioning of national representative bodies of Erzya people consists of six chapters, describing aims and tasks of Erzya national movement, its governing bodies, their plenary powers and structure. According to the document, national movement directed by Promks – convention of delegates from Erzya political parties and public organizations. Convention forms Aťań Eźem, that is operative between Promks sessions and elects Inyazor, who presents Erzya people and speaks on behalf of all the nation. In the event that there are any legal limitations for creation and operation of national parties (such prohibition exists in Russian Federation nowadays), then plenary powers of Promks are carried by Aťań Eźem. The main objective of Promks, Aťań Eźem and Inyazor, is to provide and defend national, political, economic and cultural rights of Erzya, including right to national self-determination within national Erzya territories.

== Genetics ==
Autosomally, Mokshas and Erzyas show homogeneity. About 11% of their ancestry is Nganasan-like. This East Eurasian component is typical for Uralic-speaking populations. They also have high level of Steppe-related admixture, as it can be modelled to be about half of their ancestry. The Eryza and Moksha are dominated first by R1a-CTS1211 at 40% and 33% respectively, along with R1b, other clades of R1a, J2, G2 and E-M87. The Uralic marker N3 reaches 9% in the Eryza.

== Appearance ==
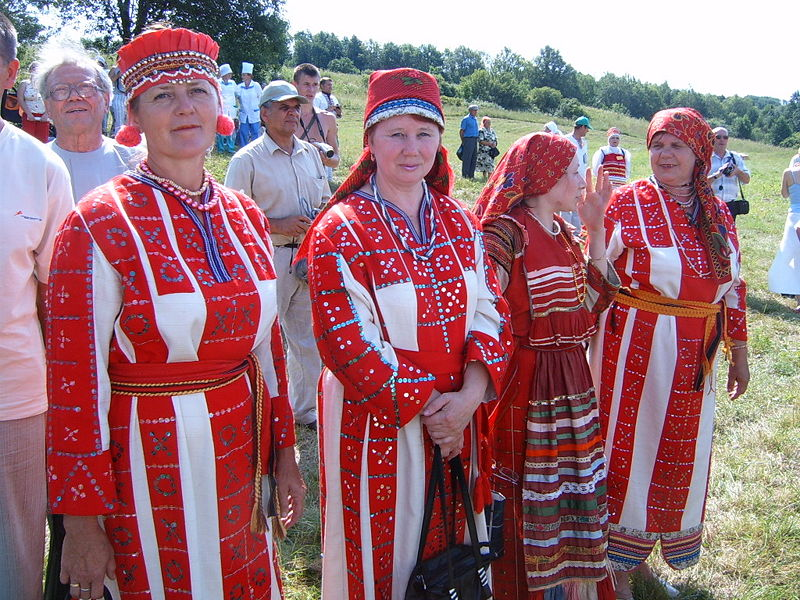
Erzya women of Penza Oblast dressed in traditional costumes

The 1911 Encyclopædia Britannica noted that the Mordvins, although they had largely abandoned their language, had "maintained a good deal of their old national dress, especially the women, whose profusely embroidered skirts, original hair-dress large ear-rings which sometimes are merely hare-tails, and numerous necklaces covering all the chest and consisting of all possible ornaments, easily distinguish them from Russian women."

Britannica described the Mordvins as having mostly dark hair and blue eyes, with a rather small and narrow build. The Moksha were described as having darker skin and darker eyes than the Erzya, while the Qaratays were described as "mixed with Tatars".

Latham described the Mordvins as taller than the Mari, with thin beards, flat faces and brown or red hair, red hair being more frequent among the Ersad than the Mokshad.

James Bryce described "the peculiar Finnish physiognomy" of the Mordvin diaspora in Armenia, "transplanted hither from the Middle Volga at their own wish", as characterised by "broad and smooth faces, long eyes, a rather flattish nose".

== List of notable Mordvins ==
=== Erzyans ===
- Alyona Erzymasskaya (died 1670), 17th-century Erzyan female military leader, the heroine of civil war.
- Stepan Erzya (Stepan Nefedov) (1876–1959), sculptor
- Fyodor Vidyayev (1912-1943), World War II submarine commander and war hero
- Aleksandr Sharonov (born 1942), philologist, poet, writer
- Kuzma Alekseyev, leader of Teryukhan unrest in 1806-1810
- Vasily Chapayev (1887–1919), a Russian soldier and Red Army commander
- Nadezhda Kadysheva (born 1959) singer

=== Mokshans ===
- Mikhail Devyatayev (1917–2002), a Soviet fighter pilot, escaped from a Nazi concentration camp
- Andrey Kizhevatov (1907–1941), a Soviet border guard commander, a leader of the Defence of Brest Fortress during Operation Barbarossa.
- Oleg Maskaev (born 1969), Russian former boxer
- Vasily Shukshin (1929–1974), Soviet writer and actor.

== See also ==
- Mordvin Tatars
- Merya
- Meshchera
- Mordovian cuisine
- Mordvin Native Religion
- Mordvinic languages
- Muromian
- Volga Finns
- Arthania
