= Tyushtya =

Demigod, epic hero, first King

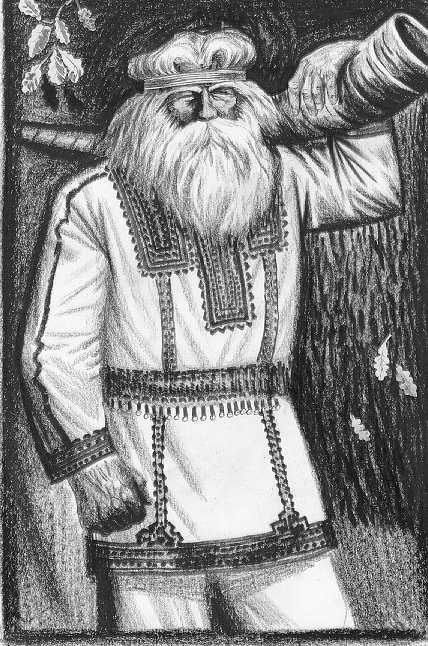
Tyushtya according to the painter Andrey Alyoshkin.

Tyushtya IPA ['tʲuʃtʲɑ] (Moksha: Тюштя, romanized: Tyushtya, Moksha: Тюштень, romanized: Tyushten, lit. 'Long desired' IPA ['tʲuʃtʲenʲ], Erzya: Тюштя, romanized: Tyushtya) is a demigod in Moksha mythology, son of Atäm (Thunder God) and a mortal girl. According to tradition, Tyushtya is able to turn into a white horse. Amid other beliefs, it is said that Tysushta is responsible for a good harvest. He was the first Moksha King chosen by clan elders. The first Moksha title for the king derives from his name (Moksha: тюштян, romanized: tyushtyan, lit. 'king' IPA [tʲuʃ'tʲɑn]).

== Epic ==
Epic based on three archaic runes first recorded by Heikki Paasonen in the beginning of the 20th century and printed posthumously in 1938–1981.

=== Archaic runes ===
He is a young lad during new moon, mature in the full moon, and old man during waning moon. The Sun is on his forehead and the Moon is on the back of his head, star is on the tip of each hair. He was born with an iron heel, back of the head of stone, wire wrapped knees. Iron-beaked Seer Raven is among his helpers as well as White Horse, White Swan, and Queen Bee. He likes musicians. When he is in a good mood everyone sings and dances. He holds a stick in one hand and torama (great horn) in another. According to Variant 1 mythical tradition Tyshtya grows old and ascends to heaven to meet their parents leaving his torama (His Great horn's name) that tells his will.

=== The basic plots ===
- A. Being chosen as a King
- B. Fighting a foreign enemy
- C. Defeating divine birth opponents
- D. Ascension to Heaven
- E. Leading his people to new better lands.

=== Later runes ===
He lives in his palace in the East. He is the reachest one in the whole world. He wears white shirt and golden clothes. In later runes' variants Queen Bee warns him he would be killed by a miraculously born child. His enemy is 70-years Erzya Widow's son born with an iron heel. He uses torama to call everyone to join the battle with the enemies who want to take the homeland. His torama's voice is like thunder, like the voice of the ancestors. In Variant B tradition he leads Mokshas to the East, away from Russian pressure. He parts the sea and let Mokshas to cross it. The Supreme God helps him. When he leads his people to the new lands the Supreme God feeds them, like it is said in the Bible. When Tyushtya grows old he asks his people where do they want them to die. They say they don't want to witness his death. He departs and leaves his torama they might use to call him with when the enemy comes. Then he returnes with his army and that will be the ultimate battle before the doomsday.

== Tyushtya in Erzya epic tradition ==
The epic might be formed first among Mokshas and later borrowed by Erzyas. In Erzya mythology, Tyushtya is a Moon god, son of Nishke (Thunder god) and mortal girl Litova. His age changes every month, following the phases of the Moon.

=== Tyshtya in erzya literature ===
Vasily Radayev compiled "Tyushtya" epic out of Moksha and Erzya epic songs in 1991. Aleksandr Sharonov compiled "Mastorava" (Erzya: Масторава, romanized: Mastorava, lit. 'Homeland Deity (name)') epic out of Moksha and Erzya epic songs in 1994.

== Indo-Iranian influence reflected in the epic ==
Mokshas are known for wearing pendants with duck legs in Early Middle Ages. It reflects the Myth of the Great Bird. They wore as well animal style horse-shaped decorations and horse head-shaped ones with duck legs, like amulets and combs.

=== Horse cult and horse sacrifice ===
Mokshas had the Horse cult from the ancient times. The Horse cult among Mordvin Tatars was described in 1591 by Giles Fletcher:

If someone's mate dies he kills his best horse and having skinned it carries the pelt on a long pole before the dead to the cemetery. They do this (as Russians say) for the dead would have a good horse to get to heaven

In Tsna Moksha gravefields dated 13–14th c horse graves are often as well as amulets and combs with horse heads. Similar cults in Mokshas and Udmurts are identified as Indo-Iranian heritage

Horse and Bull cults as well as Scythian and Permian animal style were inherited from Indo-iranians

=== Zoroastrian customs ===
As per Mary Boyce Indo-Iranians lived like nomads stretching from Lower Volga to the North Kazakhstan yet around 1700 BC (time when Rigveda should be set) Traces of Indo-Iranians still can be found in Moksha language, for instance the word Moksha: азор, romanized: azor, lit. 'master' can be traced back to Iranian ahur in Ahura Mazda. The word Moksha: паваз, romanized: pavaz, lit. 'destiny' and archaic Moksha: паз, romanized: paz, lit. 'God' are cognates with Ancient Indian bhagas 'happiness' and Avestan baγa 'God'.Vershinin 2005 Even Moksha: уре, romanized: ure, lit. 'slave' is tied with Aryan *агуа 'Arya'. Elements of Zoroastrianism can be found as well in wedding or burial rites and archaic fire cult.

== In popular culture ==
- In 2021, Ukrainian gothic folk-pop band Komu Vnyz recorded a song called "Appeal to Tyushtya" (Moksha: Тюштянень пшкадема, romanized: Tyushtyanen pshkadema), based on a poem written by Olyosh and set to music by Alina Podgornova.

== See also ==
- Tishtrya
- Divine twins
- Horse sacrifice
- Queen Bee

=== Sources ===
- Sharonov, Aleksandr (1994), Mastorava (in Erzya), Saransk
- Radayev, Vasily (1991), Tyushtya: Yovtamot. Syormadynze V. Radayev erzya-mokshon folklore koryas [Tyushtya. Legends. Written by Radayev. Based on Erzya and Moksha Folklore] (in Erzya), Saransk: Mordovskoy knizhnoy izdatelstvas, p. 208
- Deviatkina, Tatiana (2001), Some Aspects of Mordvin Mythology, Folklore 17 (PDF) (in Moksha)
- Dubasov, I.I. (1890), Tambov Area Essays. Issue 1 (in Russian), Tambov, p. 225
- Paasonen, Heikki (1938–1981), Ravila, Paavo (ed.), Mordwinische Volksdichtung. Gesammelt von H. Paasonen (in German), Helsinki
- Meletinsky, E.M., ed. (1990) [First published 1990]. Mythological Dictionary (in Russian). Soviet Encyclopaedia. ISBN 5-85270-032-0.
- Geraklitov, A.A (1938), Alatyr Mordva. One Mordvin Song. Problem of Chronology, Russian Academy Of Sciences. Saint-Petersburg History Institute Archive
- Devyatkina, Tatiana (2002), Moksha-Erzya Mythology (in Moksha), Tartu: Tartu University, ISBN 9985-867-24-6
- Yurchenkov, V.A.; Shkerdina, N.O. (2005), West European National Tradition In Comprehension Of Mordva. Genesis and Development Problem.Ethnocultural Processes In Mordovian Diaspora (in Russian), Saransk: Republic Of Mordovia Government Research Institute Of Humanities. Volume 4 (121)
- Aunovsky, V (1869), Ethnograpical Essay Of Mordva-Moksha. Simbirsk Governorate Memorial Book for 1869 (in Russian), Simbirsk, pp. 85–108
- Andreyev, S.I (2020), "Бокинский могильник средневековой мордвы" [Medieval Mordva Bokino Gravefield] (PDF), Russian Archaeology (in Russian) (2), Tambov: Derzhavin Tambov State University: 151
- Akhmedov, I. R. (2017). "Mordva: Between Khazar Khaganate, Volga Bulgaria and Rus'". In Torgoyev, A.I.; Akhmedov, I. R. (eds.). Ibn Fadlan's Journey: Volga Route From Bagdad To Bulghar (in Russian). Litres. pp. 433–437. ISBN 9785040902422.
- Fedoseyeva, E.A. (2007a), Tsar Tyushtya Depiction In Folklore And "Mastorava" Epic. Electronic Newsletter CPPK FL. No 1 (in Russian)
- Fedoseyeva, Е.А. (2005), Customs Fantasy In Epic Tale "On Tyushtya" recorded by Dubasov I.I. Philological Studies. Scientific Works Mezhvuzovsky Review in 2003–2004 (in Russian), Saransk
- Fedoseyeva, E.A. (2 January 2007), Radayev's "Tyshtya" In Folklore Space Of Modern Epic (in Russian), Studies in Humanities Journal. Electronic Issue No 5-6
- Boyce, Mary (1996), A History Of Zoroastrianism. Volume 1, The Early Period (Handbook of Oriental Studies/Handbuch Der Orientalistik), ISBN 978-9004104747
- Akhmetyanov, Rifkat (1981). Common Spiritual Culture Vocabulary Of Middle Volga Peoples (in Russian). Nauka.
- Vershinin, V.I., ed. (2005) [First published 2005]. Etymological Dictionary of Erzya and Moksha languages. Vol.3 (in Russian). Mari Vasilyev Institute For Language, Literature and History Research.
- Shigurova, Tatiana (2011), "Mordvin Bride's Veil In Wedding Rite. Ethno-Social Aspect", Вестник Чувашского Университета (in Russian) (1), Chuvash University Review: 133–138
- Bryzhinsky, A.I.; Pomerantseva, E.V.; Samorodov, K.T., eds. (1963) [First published 1979]. "UPTMN". Oral Poetry Of Mordvin people, 1963–2003 (in Moksha). Vol. 7. Mordovian Research Institute for Language, Literature, and Economy. p. 359.
- Deviatkina, Tatiana (2011). "Images of Birds in Mordvinian Mythology". Electronic Journal of Folklore. 48: 143–152. doi:10.7592/FEJF2011.48.deviatkina.
