= Shoksha, Mordovia =

Village in Mordovia, Russia

Shoksha Шокша
- Village
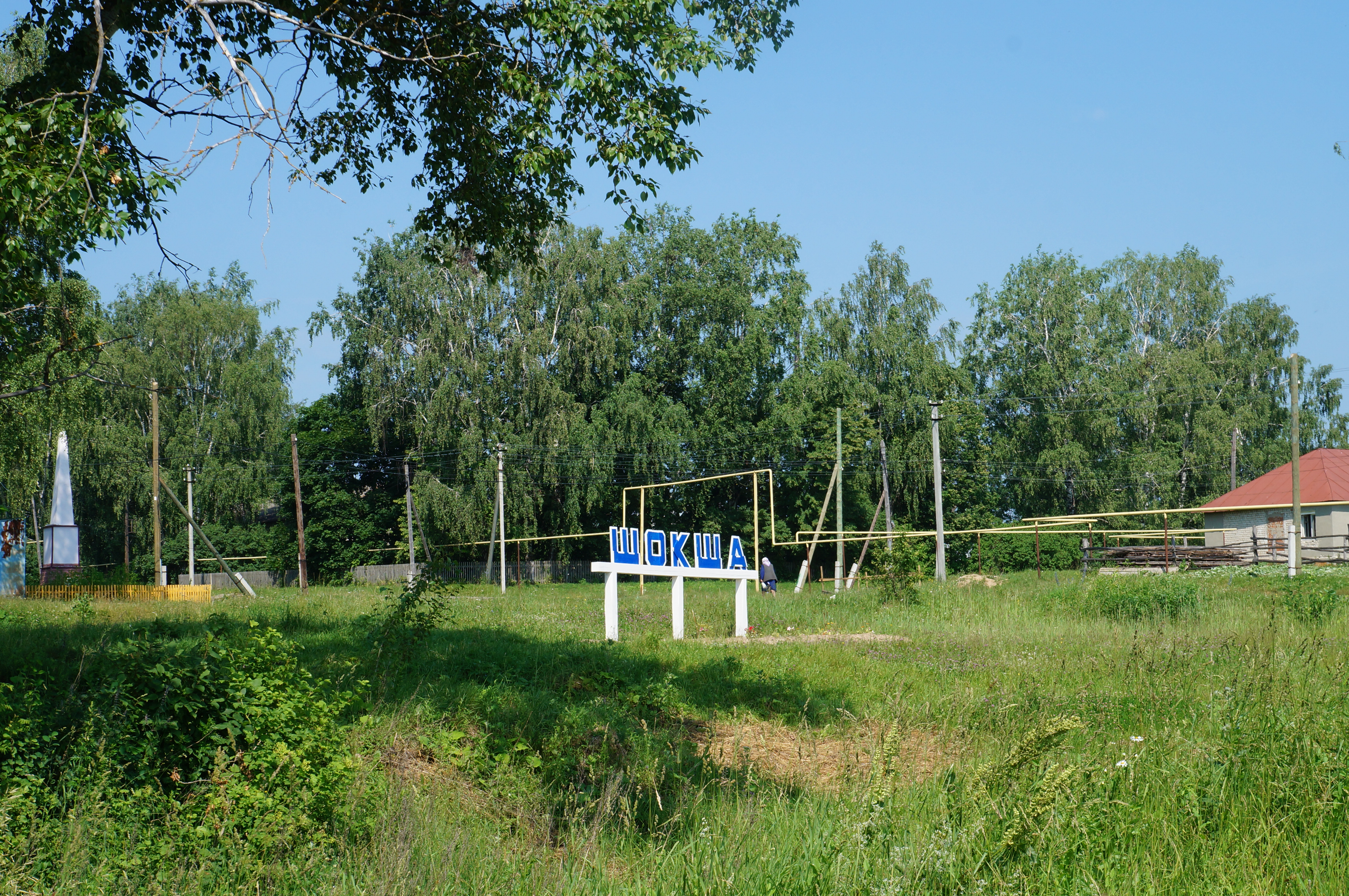
- Picture of Shoksha
- Interactive map of Shoksha
- Location of Shoksha Shoksha (Russia)
- Coordinates: 54°46′14″N 42°31′7″E
- Country: Russia
- Region: Mordovia
- District: Tengushevsky District

Population
  - Total: 540
- Time zone: UTC+3
  - Summer (DST): UTC+4
- Postal code: 431214
- Area code: +7 83445

Shoksha (Erzya: Шокш) is a village in the Tengushevsky District of Mordovia mainly populated by Shokshas. The village is the administrative center of the Shokshinskoye rural settlement, which also includes the village of Malaya Shoksha.

== Geography ==
It is located 14 kilometers from the district center of Tengushevo. The Shoksha River flows near the village and flows into the Moksha River.

== Population ==
Historical population
| Year | Pop. | ±% p.a. |
|---|---|---|
| 2002 | 615 | — |
| 2005 | 599 | −0.87% |
| 2010 | 540 | −2.05% |

== Dialect ==
The village's population speaks Russian, but primarily communicates in the Shoksha dialect. The Shoksha dialect is one of the isolated Erzya dialects, formed on an Erzya basis under the influence of the Moksha language.

== Infrastructure ==
The village has a secondary school (11 classes), a library, a community center, and a post office.

== List of streets ==
- Verkhnyaya Street
- Zarechnaya Street
- Chernitsova Street
- Molodezhnaya Street
- Moskovskaya Street
- Nizhnyaya Street
- Potapovka Street
- Tabachnaya Street

== Notable people ==
The following were born in the village:

- Ivan Abramovich Pryakhin (1899-1930) - Knight of the Order of Saint George.
- Illarion Ershkov (1907-1972) - Hero of Socialist Labour.
- Ivan Pryakhin (1922-1983) - Participant of WWII, Hero of the Soviet Union.
- Aleksandr Sharonov - Doctor of Philology, author of the Erzya - Moksha folk epic Mastorava.
- Gennady Grigorievich Meltsaev (born 1948) - People's Doctor of Mordovia, Chief Oncologist of Mordovia, Chief * Physician of the Republican Dispensary (1999-2018).
- Tatyana Nikolaevna Ovechkina (Kabaeva) (born 1950) - two-time Olympic champion.
- Nikolai Semenovich Sharonov (born 1959) - Major General of Justice, Honorary Worker of the Prosecutor's Office of the Russian Federation.
