= Drakino, Republic of Mordovia =

Rural locality in Torbeyevsky District, Mordovia, Russia

Drakino Дра́кино
- Village
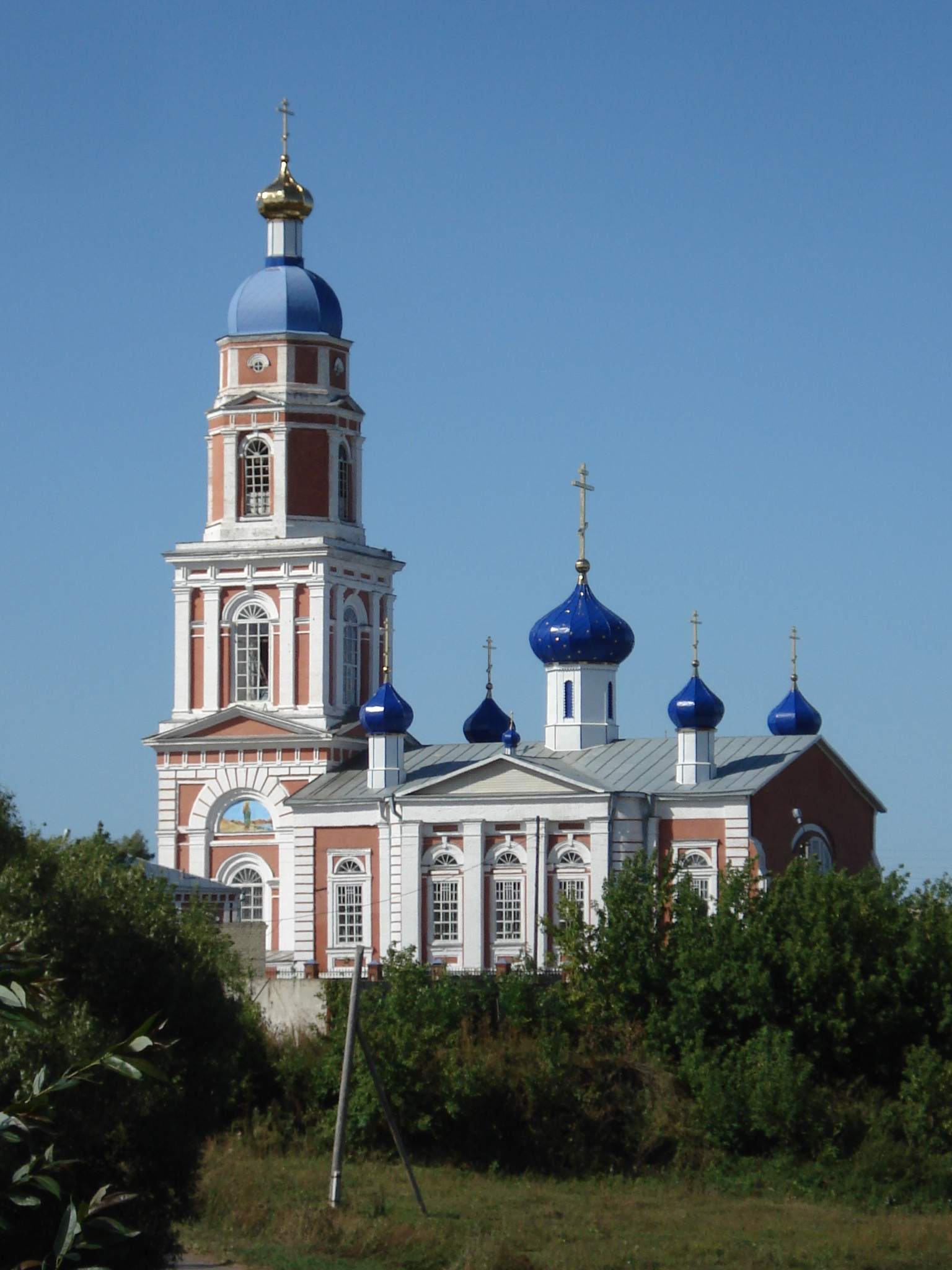
- Pokrov Church in Drakino
- Interactive map of Drakino
- Location of Shoksha Drakino (Russia)
- Coordinates: 54°03′05″N 43°15′58″E
- Country: Russia
- Region: Mordovia
- District: Torbeyevsky District
- Postal code: 431048
- Area code: +7 83456

Drakino (Moksha: Трака, Traka; Russian: Дра́кино) is a rural locality (selo) in Torbeyevsky District of the Republic of Mordovia, Russia, located on the Arziponer River (Partsa's tributary) some 168 kilometres (104 mi) west of the Mordovia's capital Saransk, and 2 kilometres (1.2 mi) south of Torbeyevo. Postal code: 431048. Telephone code: +7 834-56.

Drakino is conveniently located near Torbeyevo railway station and the R-180 motorway (Saransk–Krasnoslobodsk–Novye Vyselki), as well as in 20 kilometres (12 mi) from the federal highway M5 (Moscow–Samara–Chelyabinsk).

Mordvins (Shoksha, ethnographic subgroup of Erzyas) account for the majority of the population of Drakino.

Drakino was first mentioned in chronicles in 1669.

== Pokrov Monastery ==
The parish of the Drakino The Protection of the Mother of God (Покрова́ Пресвято́й Богоро́дицы) church was transformed into a male monastery by the Decree of the Holy Synod of the Russian Orthodox Church on February 26, 1998. Hegumen Pakhomy (Пахо́мий), née Serafim Kutsyn, has been serving as the monastery's deputy since that time. As of 2008, the monastery houses five novices.

== References and external links ==
- Богословский П. П. "Село Дракино Спасского уезда, Тамб. губ." "Тамбовские епархиальные ведомости", 1890, № 18, с. 924—948 (in Russian)
- Лузгин А. С., Юшкин Ю. Ф. "Торбеево". — Саранск.: Мордов. кн. нзд-во, 1988. — 160 с. ISBN 5-7595-0039-2
- Website of Drakino Secondary School (in Russian)
