= Torbeyevsky =

Torbeyevsky (masculine), Torbeyevskaya (feminine), or Torbeyevskoye (neuter) may refer to:

- Torbeyevsky District, a district of the Republic of Mordovia, Russia
- Torbeyevskoye Urban Settlement, a municipal formation into which Torbeyevo Work Settlement in Torbeyevsky District of the Republic of Mordovia, Russia is incorporated
- Torbeyevsky (rural locality), a rural locality (a settlement) in Venyovsky District of Tula Oblast, Russia
