= Mari mythology =

Myths in the Mari folk heritage

Mari mythology is a collection of myths belonging to the Mari folk heritage. It has many similar features and motifs with Maris' neighbouring people, like the Komis, Udmurts and Mordvins. Many of their myths are also distantly related to the myths of other Finno-Ugric peoples.

The biggest literary work on Mari mythology is the Mari epic "Jugorno", written by the Russian Anatoli Spiridonov in 2002. The epic was originally written in Russian, despite Spiridonov being very knowledgeable on the Mari language and Mari folk poetry. However, a Mari translation by Anatoli Mokejev was provided alongside the publication of the original epic. In 2015, the epic was translated into Estonian by Arvo Valton.

== The creation and cosmology ==
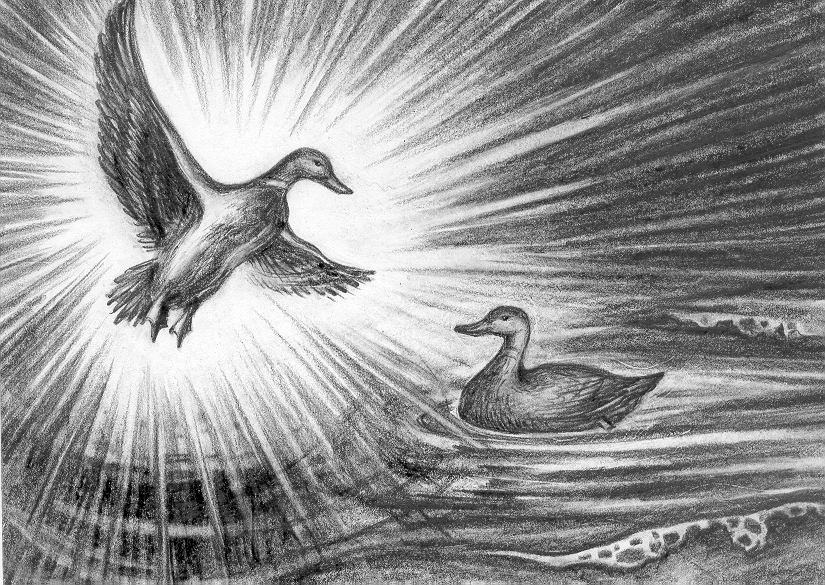
Kugu-Yumo and his brother Jõn (Kijamat) in the form of drakes create peace on the waters of the oceans

The Mari creation myth is a typical Uralic creation myth. In the beginning there was an eternal ocean in which a duck swam. She looked for land to lay her eggs on. When she finally found land, she could only fit two of her three eggs there. Out of the first egg came a duck called Jum (probably the initial form of the skygod Kugu Jumo), who started work with creating the world. And out of the second egg came a duck called Jõn (probably the initial form of the god of death Kijamat), who went out to create the underworld. Out of the third egg later came Targõltõš.

The Maris believed the sky revolved around the Northern Star, held up by the pillar of the world Kava Menge.

The end of the world lies in the north, beyond the three rivers Tupsa, Perža and Voja.

== History in mythology ==
Much of Mari mythology is mythologised history. The story of Čumbõlat is based on the historical 12th century chief of Kokšar. Poltõš is based on Boltuš, a historical chief of Malmõž.

Jugorno mentions several named chiefs of the ancient Maris. Some of them, like Kukarka and Tükan Šur are often considered historical.

== Gods, heroes and other beings ==
- Oš Kugu Jumo - "Great White God". The chiefgod and the god of the sky and light. One of the three main gods.
- Jumõn Üdõr - Daughter of Kugu Jumo.
- Onar - Mythological giant. The ancestor of Maris. Son of Kugu Jumo and Mlandava.
- Onaj - Son of Onar. Sorcerer and the husband of Piambar. The mediator between Kugu Jumo and the human world.
- Mlandava - Earth mother.
- Nönčõk-patõr - A hero made out of dough.
- Čumbõlat - Chief of Kokšar. He was buried by the river Nemdõ.
- Salij - An old forgotten Mari hero. A hunter.
- Izim - Salij's father.
- Alataj - Izim's father, from the "Lands of the Seven Great Lakes".
- Tõlze - God of the moon. Protector of marriage and birth.
- Keče - God of the sun.
- Čodõra-kuva - Forestmother. Goddess of hunting.
- Kijamat - The god of the dead and the underworld. Brother to Kugu Jumo.
- Pürõžö - One of the three main gods. God of fate.
- Küdõrčö - One of the three main gods. God of thunder.
- Piambar - Daughter of Jumo. Married Onaj against his father's will and thus had to live in the men's world.
- Azõren - Kijamat's helper, who brings the dead to the underworld.
- Akpatõr - Hunter. Went to Kakšan and later Elnet. Together with Odo and Čolman, the three patõrs and the grandchildren of Onaj and Piambar.
- Odo - Lumber. Went North to Udmurtia.
- Čolman - Horseman. Went to Ošvič and the Kama area.
- Sjar - Son of Akpatõr. Took his people to the southern areas of Volga. Ancestor of Hill Maris.
- Torkan - Leader of the Eastern Maris. Became a Keremet (Note: A Keremet is a half-god, similar to a saint.) with the name Sultan.
- Rjažan - Skilled horseman from the Urals.
- Almakaj - Organiser of Mari meetings.
- Kukarka - The headkart (Note: A kart is a head of the Mari religion. See also Mari native religion.) of all karts. Together with Čimale, the rulers of the North-East Mari county of Jüksern.
- Šurma - The Udmurt ruler of Šurma, the ancient home of Udmurts.
- Külmez - An Udmurt hero. The only trustworthy friend of Šurma.
- Savi - A female hero. Daughter of Külmez.
- Poltõš - Ruler of the Kama Maris. Built the Malmõž stronghold.
- Pektemõr - Chief of what was probably a vassal state of Jüksern. Later to be known as Tükan Šur. Friend of Targõltõš. Occupied Šurma and pushed the Udmurts to the east.
- Targõltõš - An evil spirit of chaos who manipulates people's thinking. Brother of Jumo and Kijamat.
- Jumõn Šočõn - Mother and councillor of Kugu Jumo.
- Šočõn Ava - Goddess of birth and fertility.
- Akmazik - A hero who was foreseen to defeat Tükan Šur.
- Uvanij - Sorcerer and daughter of Tükan Šur.
- Oš Pondaš - "Grey Beard". The spirit of ancestors. A keremet.
- Mardež - God of wind.
- Kugurak - With Čotkar and Akpatõr, the oldest Mari heroes.
- Nekoš - A keremet of the Northern Maris.
- Oš Kugu Pürtüš - "The White Infinity". Nature.

== Sources ==
- Anatoli Spiridonov. (2002). Jugorno, Laul Pühast Teest. https://www.apollo.ee/jugorno-mari-eepos.html (in Estonian)
