= Aleksandr Sharonov =

Alexander Sharonov
- Sharonon Sandra; Шарононь Сандра
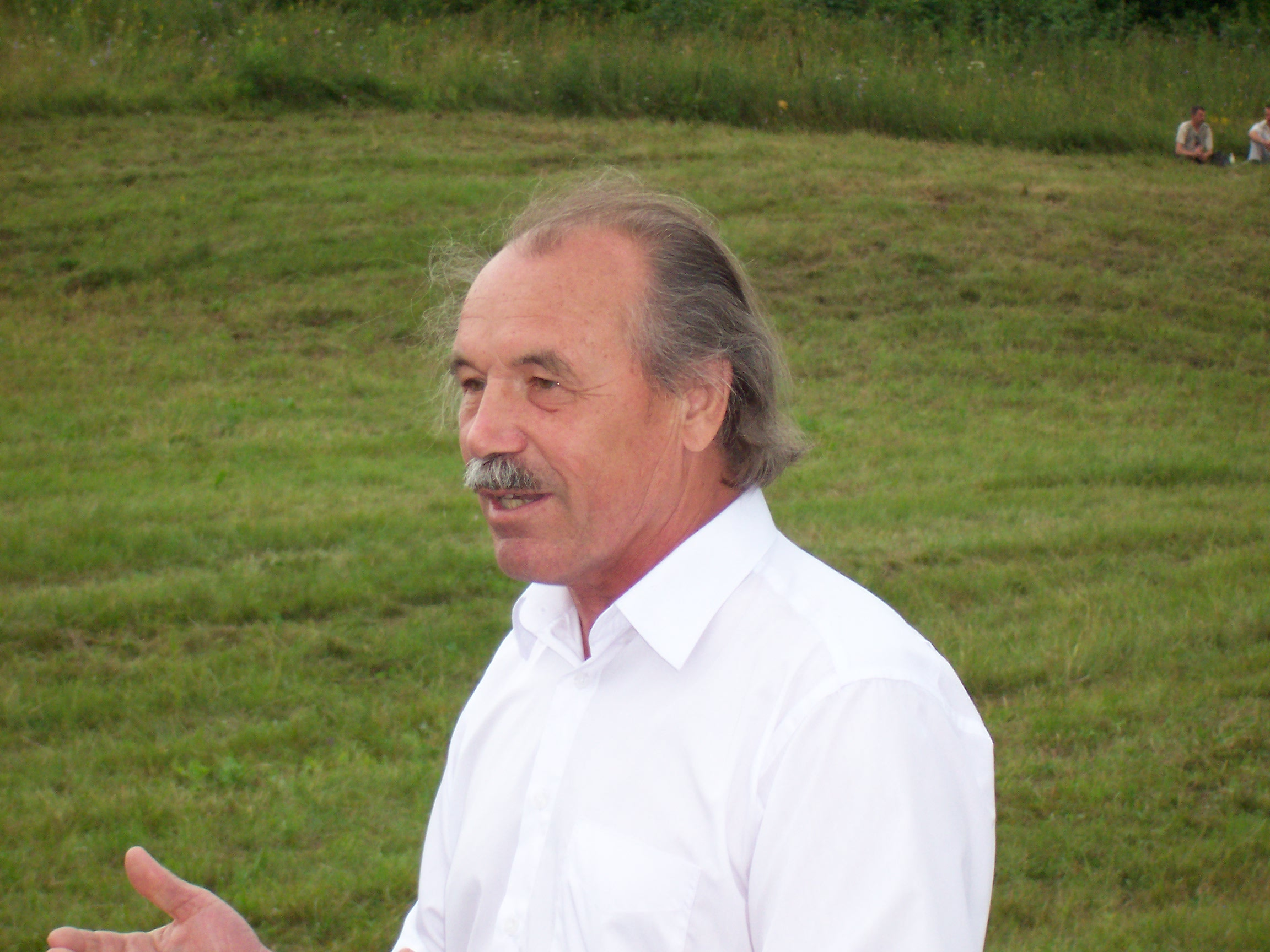
- Sharonov in 2007
- Born: Alexander Markovich Sharonov; 18 February 1942 (age 84); Shoksha, Tengushevsky District, Mordovian ASSR, Soviet Union (now Republic of Mordovia, Russia)

Aleksandr Markovich Sharonov (born 18 February 1942) (Russian: Алекса́ндр Ма́ркович Шаро́нов, [alʲɪksˈandr ˈmarkɐvit͡ɕ ʂaˈronɐf], alias Sharononj Sandra (Erzya: Шарононь Сандра, romanized: Šaronoń Sandra, [ʃɑˈrɔnɔɲ ˈsɑndrɑ]) is a Mordvin (Russian) philologist (Finno-Ugric languages), folklorist, poet and prose writer.

His research and social interests include history, mythology and folklore of Erzya and Moksha peoples.

== Works ==
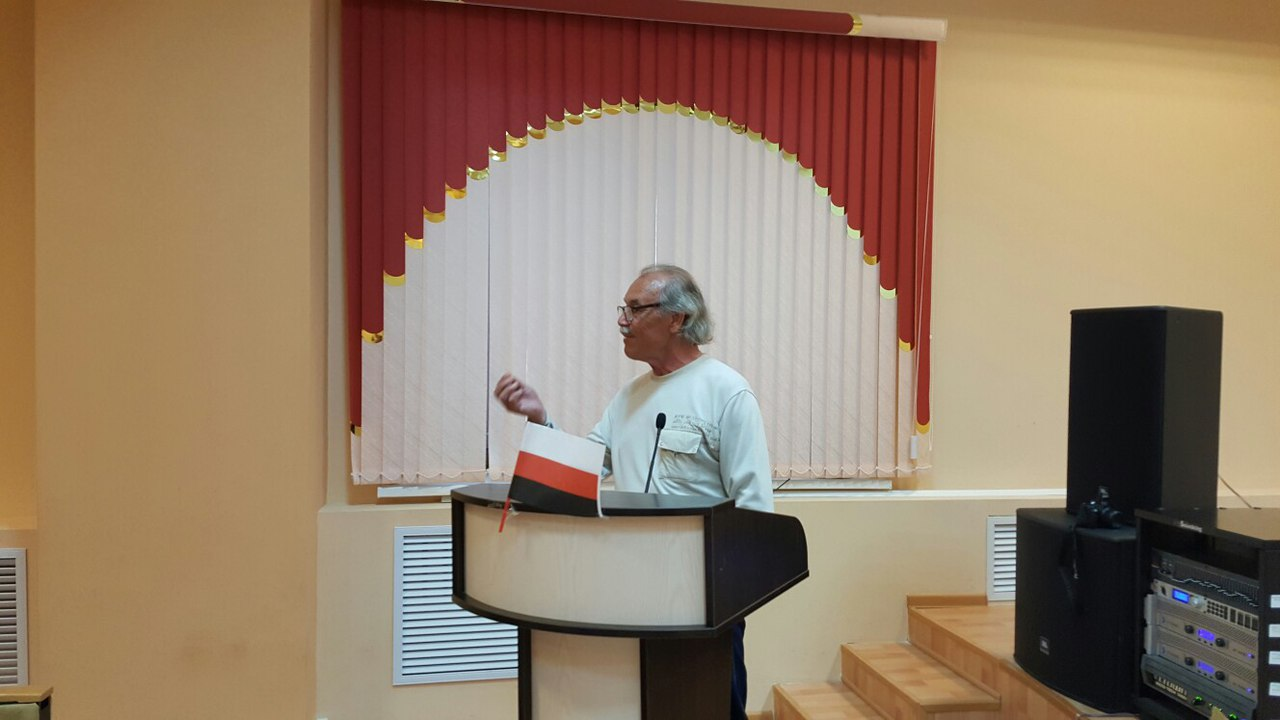
Sharonov at the 5th Erzya People's Congress, Saransk, 2016

- Устно-поэтическое творчество мордовского народа (1977)
- Mastorava an epic poem based on Mordvin mythology and folklore, written in Erzya (1994), translated in Moksha, Russian, and Hungarian languages
- Мордовский героический эпос (2001)
- На земле Инешкипаза (2006)
- Потехония, a science fiction novel (2012)
- Эрзя, Меря, Русь в историографии России (2013)
- Планета Эра, poetry and prose (2014)

== Recognition ==
- 1997: Matthias Castrén Society Literary Prize, Finland
- 1996: Mordovia State Prize, Russia
