= House-Museum of M.P. Devyatayev =

Museum in Torbeyevo, Mordovia, Russia

- Дом-музей М. П. Девятаева
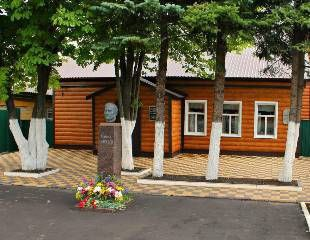
- Established: 8 May 1975
- Location: Torbeyevo, Mordovia, Russia
- Coordinates: 54°4′26″N 43°14′36″E
- Type: museum

The House-Museum of M.P. Devyatayev (Russian: Дом-музей М. П. Девятаева) is a museum in Torbeyevo, Republic of Mordovia, Russia.

== History ==
The museum was opened on 8 May 1975.

== Exhibitions ==
The museum exhibits artifacts and biography of Soviet fighter pilot Mikhail Devyataev. It also displays the history and culture of Mordovia.

== See also ==
- List of museums in Russia
