= Shokshas =

Ethnographic group of Erzya people

Shoksha (Erzya: шокшот, romanized: šokšot, Russian: шокша, romanized: shoksha) is an ethnographic group of Erzya people. It is named after the village of Shoksha in Tengushevsky District, Mordovia. They live mostly in Mordovia, Tengushevsky District and Torbeyevsky District. The ethnonym is relatively recent.

Shoksha live (or lived) in following settlements:

- Tengushevsky District: Баево, Березняк, Вяжга, Дудниково, Коляево, Кураево, Малая Шокша, Мельсетьево, Мокшанка, Нароватово, Сакаево, Стандрово, Шелубей, Широмасово, Shoksha
- Torbeyevsky District: Drakino, Кажлодка, Майский, Фёдоровка (depopulated), Якстере Теште (depopulated)

== Language ==
Shoksha
- Shokshsky, Shoksha-Mordovian
- шокшскень кяль
- Native to: Russia
- Region: Shoksha, Tengushevsky District
- Ethnicity: Shokshas
- Native speakers: 1,669
- Language family: Uralic: Mordvinic; Erzya; Shoksha
- Writing system: unwritten

Language codes
- ISO 639-3: –
- Glottolog: None
- Dialect map of Moksha-Erzya-Shoksha; "E-V" is for Shoksha

The Shoksha speak the Shoksha dialect, a dialect of the Erzya language formed under the influence of the Moksha language, as for a long time Shokshas have been living with and surrounded by Mokshas. The language is unwritten and has a status of critically endangered.

== Genetics ==
Based on 65 samples from Tengushevsky, 44.6 percent of Shoksha men have the haplogroup R1a (mostly R1a-CTS1211), and 43.1 percent carry the halpogroup N1c. Some other haplogroups are found with lower frequencies.
