= Torbeyevo =

Torbeyevo (Russian: Торбеево) is the name of several inhabited localities in Russia:

- Torbeyevo, Republic of Mordovia, an urban-type settlement in the Republic of Mordovia
- Torbeyevo, Smolensk Oblast, a rural locality (a village) in Smolensk Oblast
- Torbeyevo, name of several other rural localities
