= Mordovian cuisine =

Traditional cuisine of the Mordovians

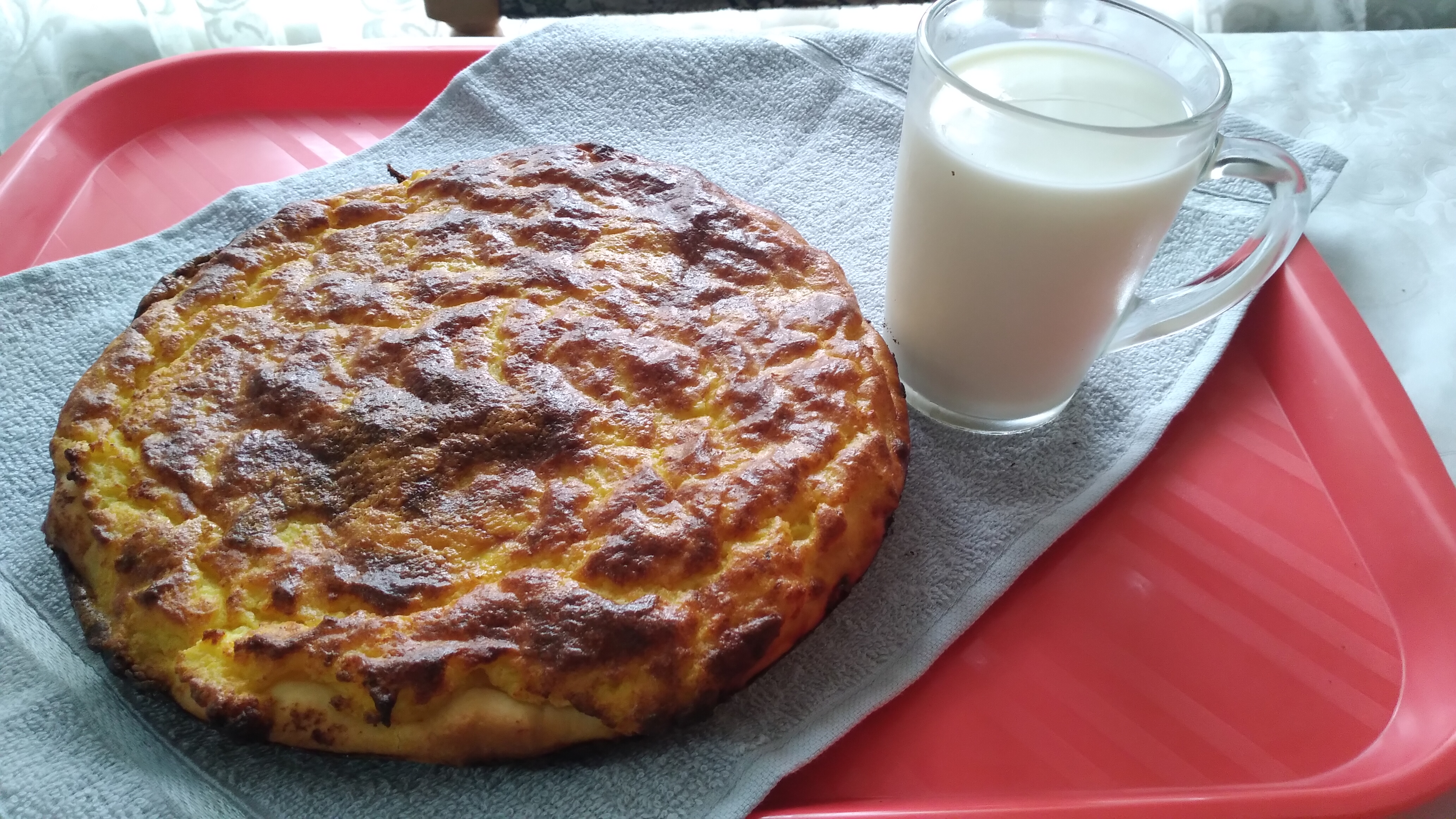
Erzyan panzhakay alongside milk

Mordovian cuisine is the traditional cuisine of the Mordovians, who now live in Mordovia and surrounding areas. It consists of a variety of dishes, based on geographical, cultural and climate features of the region, with fish traditionally featured heavily.

== Fish ==
Volga Finns settled on the riversides, in places convenient for fishing. Traditionally Mordovians pay a great attention to the support of nature. Fish dishes varied by the type of cooking; fish was eaten raw, frozen, dried, salty, and boiled. Fish liver, fish eggs, milt, cod-liver oil were used as cooking ingredients.

== Meat ==
Meat and poultry was stewed, baked and boiled. There were no fried meat dishes in Finno-Ugric cuisine, only roasted dishes which also were borrowed from Tatar cuisine in the 19th century. Beef, mutton and pork were preserved in several ways. The most ancient preservation method was drying. Pre-boiled meat was dried in an oven or under the sun. Fat from broth was collected and used for cooking. Meat was also frozen for preservation.

In ancient times, horsemeat was used for food, but later it was used only in rituals (molyam) associated with horse worship.

== Herbs and vegetables ==
Many farms grew cabbage, cucumbers, potatoes, garlic, carrots, beans, beets, turnips, radishes, and pumpkins. In summer and autumn, a great deal of fruit were eaten fresh. Pickled cucumbers were used for preparing dishes. Beets and pumpkins were eaten steamed as a dessert. Shschi (cabbage soup) was a traditional soup consisting of cabbage and potatoes cooked in chicken broth with onions and carrots added at the end. Herbs such as watercress, horseradish, onion, cow parsnip, horsetail, nettle, and wild goutweed were used for preparing dishes instead of spices.

== Mushrooms ==
Mushrooms were one of the main ingredients in traditional dishes. They were boiled, salted, fried, soured and dried.

== Grains ==
Grains had a special place in Mordovian cuisine. Finno-Ugric peoples mostly used wheat, barley, spelt and rye (black cereal). Ritual meals in Mordovia were associated with agricultural period, family and public holidays. For example, millet porridge was not only a delicious meal on weddings. christenings, funerals, but also there was a special ritual baba's porridge (female porridge) made at the last day of a bride at home.

=== Bliny (pancakes) ===
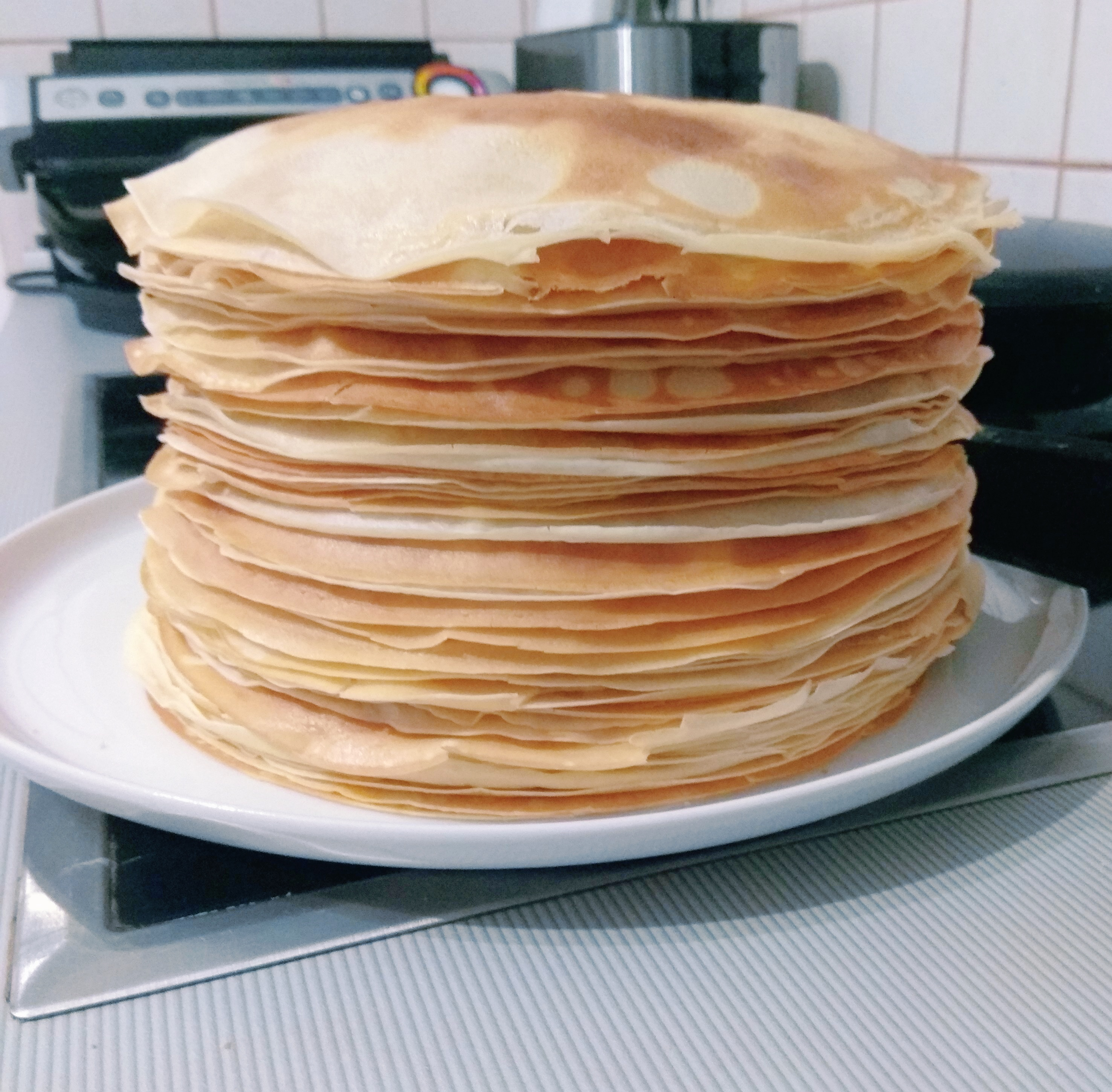
Blinys

Bliny (pancakes) were a favorite dish of Mordovians. They were called pachat and were made from rye, wheat, millet and pea flour. Traditionally Mordovians liked the pancakes to be rather thick and added boiled potatoes into the dough. Such pancakes were served with milk and honey. Erzya people call them panžakaj (Erzya: панжакай).
