= Finnic mythologies =

Various mythologies of the Finnic peoples

Finnic mythologies are the mythologies of the various Finnic peoples:

- Finnish mythology
- Estonian mythology
- Komi mythology
- Mari mythology
- Sámi shamanism

== See also ==
- Baltic mythology
- Bear worship
- Dorvyzhy
- Hungarian mythology
- Mastorava
- Proto-Uralic religion
- Rock carvings at Alta

== References and notes ==
- Abercromby, John (1898). Pre- and Proto-historic Finns. D. Nutt.
- Herman Hofberg, "Lapparnas Hednatro"
- Uno Holmberg, "Lapparnas religion"
- Rafael Karsten, " Samefolkets religion"
- Edgar Reuteskiöld, " De nordiska samernas religion"
- Tatiana Deviatkina, "Some Aspects of Mordvin Mythology". In: Folklore: Electronic Journal of Folklore 17 (2001): 96-106. DOI: doi:10.7592/FEJF2001.17.mordmyth
- Paasonen (ed.), Mordwinische Volksdichtung (1941).
