= Tengushevo =

Rural locality in Mordovia, Russia

Coordinates: 54°46′08″N 42°43′10″E

Tengushevo (Russian: Теньгу́шево; Moksha: Теньгжеле, Teńgžele; Erzya: Теньгжвеле, Teńgžvele) is a rural locality (a selo) and the administrative center of Tengushevsky District of the Republic of Mordovia, Russia. Population: 4,230 (2010 census); 4,103 (2002 census); 4,063 (1989 Soviet census).
