= Erzya literature =

Literature written in the Erzya language or by the Erzya people

Mordovia within Russia

Erzya literature is literature written in the Erzya language, which is spoken by about half a million people in the Republic of Mordovia and adjacent regions in Russia. Erzya literature, written using Cyrillic, experienced a renaissance in the 1920s and 1930s.

== Noted Erzya writers ==
- Aleksej Vasil'evich Dunyashin (8 Feb. 1904–1931) was born in the Erzya village of Poksh Tolkan in Pokhvistneva Raion, Samara Oblast. He wrote feuilletons (satirical and entertaining columns) for various newspapers throughout the Soviet Union from 1924 till his death in 1931. A collection of his writings, "Pidsipalakst" (Stinging nettles), was published in 1930.
