= Shoksha, Arkhangelsk Oblast =

Shoksha Шокша
- Settlement
- Location within Arkhangelsk Oblast Location within Russia
- Coordinates: 61°24′N 42°03′E
- Country: Russia
- Region: Arkhangelsk Oblast
- District: Velsky District
- Time zone: UTC+3:00

Shoksha (Russian: Шокша) is a rural locality (a settlement) in Pakshengskoye Rural Settlement of Velsky District, Arkhangelsk Oblast, Russia. The population was 102 as of 2014. There are 5 streets.

== Geography ==
Shoksha is located 49 km north of Velsk (the district's administrative centre) by road. Kulakovo-Podgorye is the nearest rural locality.
