= Shoksha, Vologda Oblast =

Shoksha Шокша
- Village
- Location within Vologda Oblast Location within Russia
- Coordinates: 60°01′N 40°53′E
- Country: Russia
- Region: Vologda Oblast
- District: Syamzhensky District
- Time zone: UTC+3:00

Shoksha (Russian: Шокша) is a rural locality (a village) in Ustretskoye Rural Settlement, Syamzhensky District, Vologda Oblast, Russia. The population was 165 as of 2002. There are 5 streets.

== Geography ==
Shoksha is located 15 km west of Syamzha (the district's administrative centre) by road. Slobodka is the nearest rural locality.
