= Mastorava =

Epic poem

Mastorava (Масторава) is an Erzya epic poem compiled based on Erzya mythology and folklore by Aleksandr Sharonov, published in 1994 in the Erzya language, with a Moksha language version announced.

The poem consists of five parts entitled "The Universe", "Antiquity", "King Tyushtya's Age", "The Heroic Age" and "The New Age". Mastorava is an Earth goddess in Mordvin mythology. The name mastor-ava literally means "earth woman", mastor being the Mordvin for "earth, land".

In the Mastorava epic, Tyushtya is a peasant elected by people to be the king and leader of Mokshan and Erzyan clans alliance and the warlord of allied army. During his rule, Mordvinia stretched from Volga to Dnieper and from the Oka to the Black Sea.

In Erzya mythology, Tyushtya is a moon god, son of the thunder god and the mortal girl Litova. He changes his age every month, following the phases of the Moon.

== See also ==
- Erzya native religion
