= Mikhail Devyataev =

Soviet fighter pilot during World War II and POW of Nazi Germany

- Born: 8 July 1917; Torbeyevo, Russian Republic
- Died: 24 November 2002 (aged 85); Kazan, Tatarstan, Russian Federation
- Military career
- Allegiance: Soviet Union
- Branch: Soviet Air Forces
- Service years: 1938–1945
- Rank: Senior lieutenant
- Unit: 104th Guards Fighter Aviation Regiment
- Conflicts: World War II
- Awards: Hero of the Soviet Union

Mikhail Petrovich Devyataev (Russian: Михаил Петрович Девятаев; Moksha: Михаил Петрович Девятаев/Mixail Petrovič Devätaev; 8 July 1917 – 24 November 2002) was a Soviet fighter pilot known for his escape from a Nazi concentration camp on the island of Usedom, in the Baltic Sea.

== Early life and military career ==
Mikhail Devyataev was born in 1917 at Torbeyevo, Mikhail was the thirteenth child born to the family of a Mokshan peasant.

In 1934, he saw an airplane for the first time (it was an air ambulance that had arrived in Torbeyevo to pick up a sick person). After that, he decided to become a pilot.

In 1938 he graduated from a School of River Navigation in Kazan and worked as the captain of a small ship on the Volga. That same year he was conscripted into the Red Army and began education at a Chkalov Flying School, graduating in 1940.

He became a lieutenant and a fighter pilot.

On June 22, 1941, the Axis powers attacked the USSR. Devyatayev fought from the first day of the war in Belorussian Special Military District (which became the Western Front). On June 24, 1941, he shot down his first enemy plane, a Ju 87. Two days later, his I-16 plane was shot down in an air battle near Minsk. A Luftwaffe fighter pilot of enemy "Messerschmitt-109" tried to shoot Devyatayev, who had parachuted out of his burning plane, in mid-air. Devyatayev saved his life because he managed to make a skydive. Soon he was awarded the Order of the Red Banner.

On 23 September he was seriously wounded (he was hit in his left leg). After a long stay in the military hospital he was assigned to Po-2 unit and then to medical aviation. He resumed his duties as a fighter pilot after his meeting with the famous Soviet ace Aleksandr Pokryshkin in May 1944.

Commander of an echelon with the 104th Guards Fighter Aviation Regiment, Senior Lieutenant Devyatayev destroyed nine enemy planes.

== Capture and imprisonment ==
On July 13, 1944, while flying a Bell P-39, Devyataev made three combat sorties, escorting bombers, and then flew for the fourth time to intercept enemy Junkers. He was shot down by a Messerschmitt aircraft near Lvov. He was downed over German-occupied territory and became a prisoner of war, held in the Łódź concentration camp. He made an attempt to escape on 13 August but was caught and transferred to the Sachsenhausen concentration camp.

He soon realised that his situation was perilous because as a Soviet pilot, he could expect extreme brutality and high risk of execution; therefore, he allegedly managed to exchange identities with a dead Soviet infantryman named Grigoriy Nikitenko.

Devyataev was later transferred to a camp in Usedom to be a part of a forced labor crew working for the German missile program on the island of Peenemünde.

In the preserved camp records, he appears correctly as prisoner 11024 Dewjatajew, Michail, however. Under hellish conditions, the prisoners were forced to repair runways and clear unexploded bombs by hand. Security was rigidly enforced with vicious guards and dogs, and there was little chance of escape. Even so, by February 1945, Devyataev concluded that, however remote, the chance of escape was preferable to certain death as a prisoner.

== Escape ==
Devyataev managed to convince three other prisoners (Sokolov, Krivonogov and Nemchenko) that he could fly them to freedom. They decided to run away at dinner time, when most of the guards were in the dining room. Sokolov and Nemchenko were able to create a work gang composed only of Soviet citizens, as they did not know foreign languages with which to communicate freely and coordinate their plans with other inmates.

At noon on 8 February 1945, as the ten Soviet POWs, including Devyataev, were at work on the runway, one of the work gang, Ivan Krivonogov, picked up a crowbar, killed their guard and took his rifle. Another prisoner, Peter Kutergin, quickly stripped off the guard's uniform and slipped it on.

The work gang, led by the "guard", managed to unobtrusively take over the camp commandant's He 111 H22 bomber and fly from the island. Devyataev piloted the aircraft.

The Germans tried to intercept the bomber unsuccessfully.

The aircraft was damaged by Soviet air defences, but managed to land in Soviet territory. Devyatayev and his comrades were met by soldiers of the artillery unit of the 61st Army of the Red Army

== Return to Soviet Union ==
Upon return to Soviet controlled territory, the escapees were detained in accordance with Order No. 270. Devyataev and the other escapees were taken to an NKVD filtration camp for questioning. The NKVD did not believe Devyataev's story, arguing both that it was impossible for an airman to have been taken to a Rocket Camp, and for the prisoners to take over an airplane without cooperation from the Germans. He and the two officers were detained in the filtration camp until the end of the war. After a short time in hospital in late March 1945, the seven other escapees were sent to Penal Battalions. Five died in action over the following months. According to another account, all other eight escapees were assigned to the Penal Battalions, with only three surviving the war.

The escapees provided important information about the German missile program, especially about the V-1 and V-2.

== Postwar ==
Devyataev was released from the filtration camp as part of the mass amnesty at the end of the war, and discharged from the army in November 1945. However, the stigma of his classification as a prisoner of war made it difficult for him to find a job for some time. Eventually, however, Devyataev found work as a manual laborer in Kazan. He took a job at the Kazan river port as a duty officer at the river station, then trained as a captain-mechanic. From 1949 onwards he worked as an assistant to the captain of the longboat Ogonyok; from 1952 he was the captain of the longboat Ogonyok, and from 1955 he was transferred to the position of captain of the motor ship.

Soviet authorities cleared Devyataev only in 1957, after the head of the Soviet space program Sergey Korolyov personally presented his case, arguing that the information provided by Devyataev and the other escapees had been critical for the Soviet space program. On 15 August 1957, Devyataev became a Hero of the Soviet Union and a subject of multiple books and newspaper articles.

He continued to live in Kazan. In the late 1950s, Devyatayev was entrusted with testing the "Raketa", one of the world's first passenger hydrofoil ships; for many years he worked as a captain of river ships and became the first captain of the hydrofoil ship "Meteor".

In 1959, he became a member of the Communist Party of the Soviet Union (CPSU). In 1972, he published his memoirs.

== Death and legacy ==
Devyataev died in Kazan in 2002, aged 85, and is buried in the Arskoe Cemetery in Kazan near the World War II Memorial. There is a museum dedicated to Devyataev in his native Torbeyevo (opened on 8 May 1975) and monuments in Usedom and Kazan.

V2. Escape from Hell – is a 2021 Russian prison action thriller war biopic film about Mikhail Devyatayev's escape, directed by Timur Bekmambetov.

== Awards ==
- Hero of the Soviet Union (15 August 1957)
- Order of Lenin (15 August 1957)
- Two Order of the Red Banner (1 February 1944, ?)
- Order of the Patriotic War 1st class (11 March 1985)
- Order of the Patriotic War 2nd class (7 May 1944)
- Patriotic Order of Merit 2nd class
- Campaign and jubilee medals

Devyataev became an honoured citizen of the Republic of Mordovia, and of the city of Kazan, in the Russian Federation, along with the cities of Wolgast and Zinnowitz in Germany.

== See also ==
- Bob Hoover
- Sergey Vandyshev
- Alexander Pokryshkin

== Bibliography ==
- Devyataev, Mikhail (1972). Полёт к Солнцу. Moscow: DOSAAF.
- Devyataev, Mikhail (1988). Побег из ада. Kazan: Татар. кн. изд-во. ISBN 5298000088. OCLC 28612379.
- Max Hastings, Armageddon, 2004 ) ISBN 0-333-90836-8
