= Proto-Uralic religion =

Elements of a Proto-Uralic religion can be recovered from reconstructions of the Proto-Uralic language.

== Soul dualism ==
According to linguist Ante Aikio, although "evidence of immaterial culture is very limited" in the Proto-Uralic language, "a couple of lexical items can be seen as pointing to a shamanistic system of beliefs and practices." The concept of soul dualism, which is widely attested among Uralic-speaking peoples, probably dates back to the Proto-Uralic period: the word *wajŋi (‘breath-soul') designated the soul bound to the living body, which only left it at the moment of death, whereas *eśi (or *iśi, *ićći) referred to the 'shadow-soul', believed to be able to leave the body during lifetime, as when dreaming, in a state of unconsciousness or in a shaman's spirit journey.

== Shamanic practices and psychedelic mushrooms ==
The Indo-Iranian loanword *pi̮ŋka designated a 'psychedelic mushroom', perhaps the one used by the shaman to enter altered states of consciousness. The verb *kixi- meant both 'to court [of birds]' and 'to sing a shamanistic song', suggesting that it referred to states of both sexual and spiritual excitement. If the etymology remains uncertain, the word 'shaman' itself may be rendered as *nojta, and the shamanic practice as *jada-, although semantic variations in the daughter languages make the reconstruction debatable (cf. Erzya Mordvin jɑdɑ- 'to conjure, do magic, bewitch', East Khanty jɔːl- 'to tell fortunes, shamanize', Ket Selkup tjɑːrә- 'to curse; quarrel').

== Creation myths involving waterbirds ==
A common creation myth shared by many Finno-Ugric peoples is the earth-diver myth in which a diver, often a waterbird, dives into the sea to pick up earth from the bottom to form the lands. In the Mordvin variant, the diver is the Devil (sometimes in the form of a goose), in the Yenisey Khanty variant a red-throated loon, and in at least one Finnish version a black-throated loon

== Theonyms indicating belief in a sky-god ==
Several Finno-Ugric languages have a theonym that can be derived from the Proto-Uralic word *jilma meaning sky or weather. These include Udmurt Inmar, Komi-Zyrjan Jen, Khanty Num-Ilәm, Meadow Mari Jumo and Finnish Ilmarinen. These theonyms suggest an early belief in a sky-god.

== See also ==
- Finnic mythologies
