= Torbeyevsky District =

Torbeyevsky District Торбеевский район (Russian)
- District

Other transcription(s)
  - Moksha: Тарбеень аймак
  - Erzya: Торбейбуе
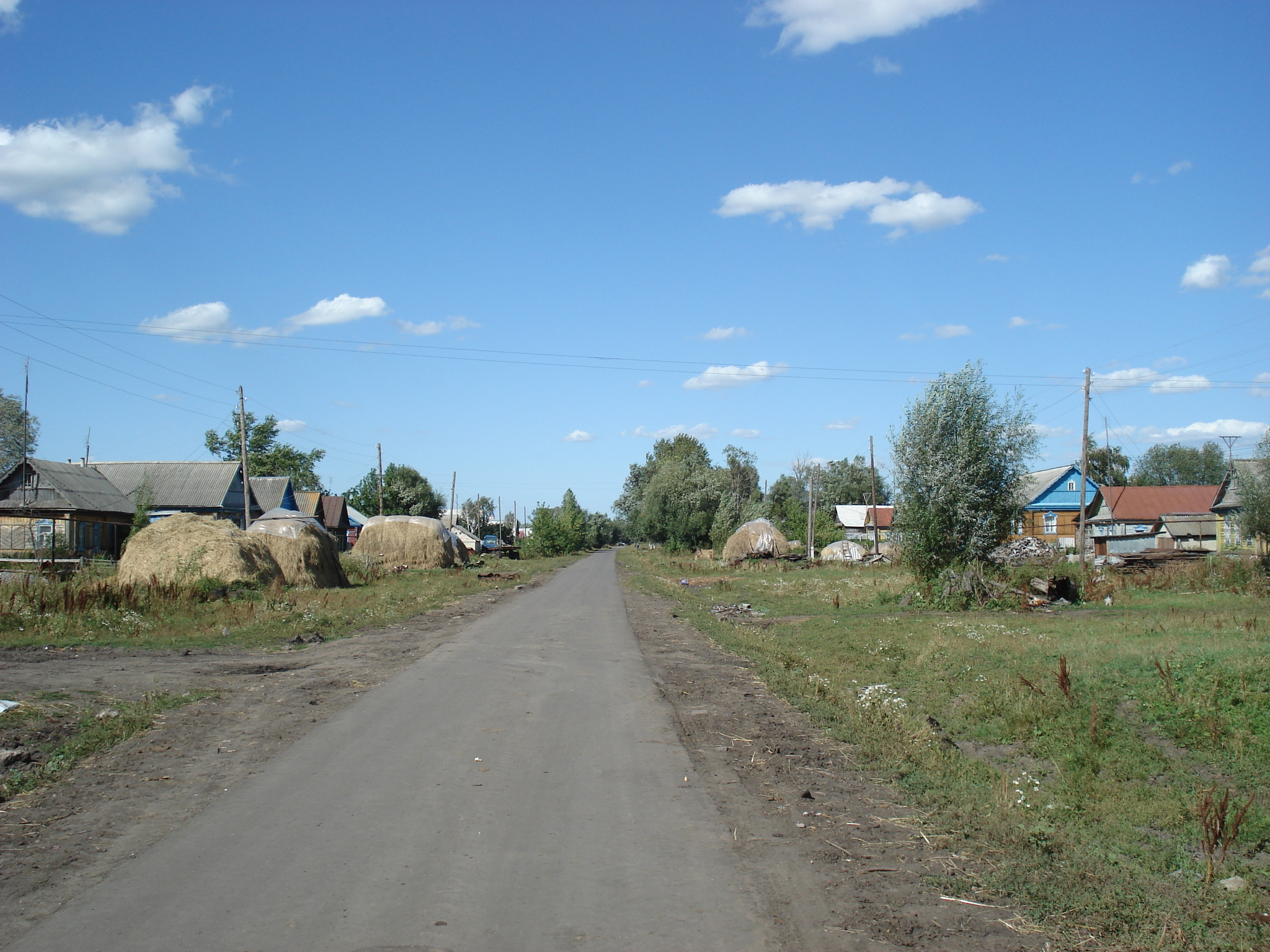
- Village Drakino in Torbeyevsky District
- Location of Torbeyevsky District in the Republic of Mordovia
- Coordinates: 54°04′N 43°14′E
- Country: Russia
- Federal subject: Republic of Mordovia
- Established: 16 July 1928
- Administrative center: Torbeyevo

Area
  - Total: 1,124.9 km^{2} (434.3 sq mi)

Population (2010 Census)
  - Total: 21,479
  - Density: 19.094/km^{2} (49.454/sq mi)
  - Urban: 43.6%
  - Rural: 56.4%

Administrative structure
  - Administrative divisions: 1 Work settlements, 15 Selsoviets
  - Inhabited localities: 1 urban-type settlements, 53 rural localities

Municipal structure
  - Municipally incorporated as: Torbeyevsky Municipal District
  - Municipal divisions: 1 urban settlements, 15 rural settlements
- Time zone: UTC+3 (MSK)
- OKTMO ID: 89654000
- Website: http://torbeevo.e-mordovia.ru

Population of Torbeyevsky District
- 2010 Census: 21,479
- 2002 Census: 23,285
- 1989 Census: 26,246
- 1979 Census: 31,022

Torbeyevsky District (Russian: Торбе́евский райо́н; Moksha: Тарбеень аймак, Tarbejeń ajmak; Erzya: Торбейбуе, Torbejbuje) is an administrative and municipal district (raion), one of the twenty-two in the Republic of Mordovia, Russia. It is located in the southwest of the republic. The area of the district is 1,124.9 square kilometers (434.3 sq mi). Its administrative center is the urban locality (a work settlement) of Torbeyevo. As of the 2010 Census, the total population of the district was 21,479, with the population of Torbeyevo accounting for 43.6% of that number.

== Administrative and municipal status ==
Within the framework of administrative divisions, Torbeyevsky District is one of the twenty-two in the republic. It is divided into one work settlement (an administrative division with the administrative center in the work settlement (inhabited locality) of Torbeyevo), and fifteen selsoviets, all of which comprise fifty-three rural localities. As a municipal division, the district is incorporated as Torbeyevsky Municipal District. Torbeyevo Work Settlement is incorporated into an urban settlement, and the fifteen selsoviets are incorporated into fifteen rural settlements within the municipal district. The work settlement of Torbeyevo serves as the administrative center of both the administrative and municipal district.
