= Tengushevsky District =

Tengushevsky District Теньгушевский район (Russian)
- District

Other transcription(s)
  - Moksha: Теньгжелень аймак
  - Erzya: Теньгушбуе
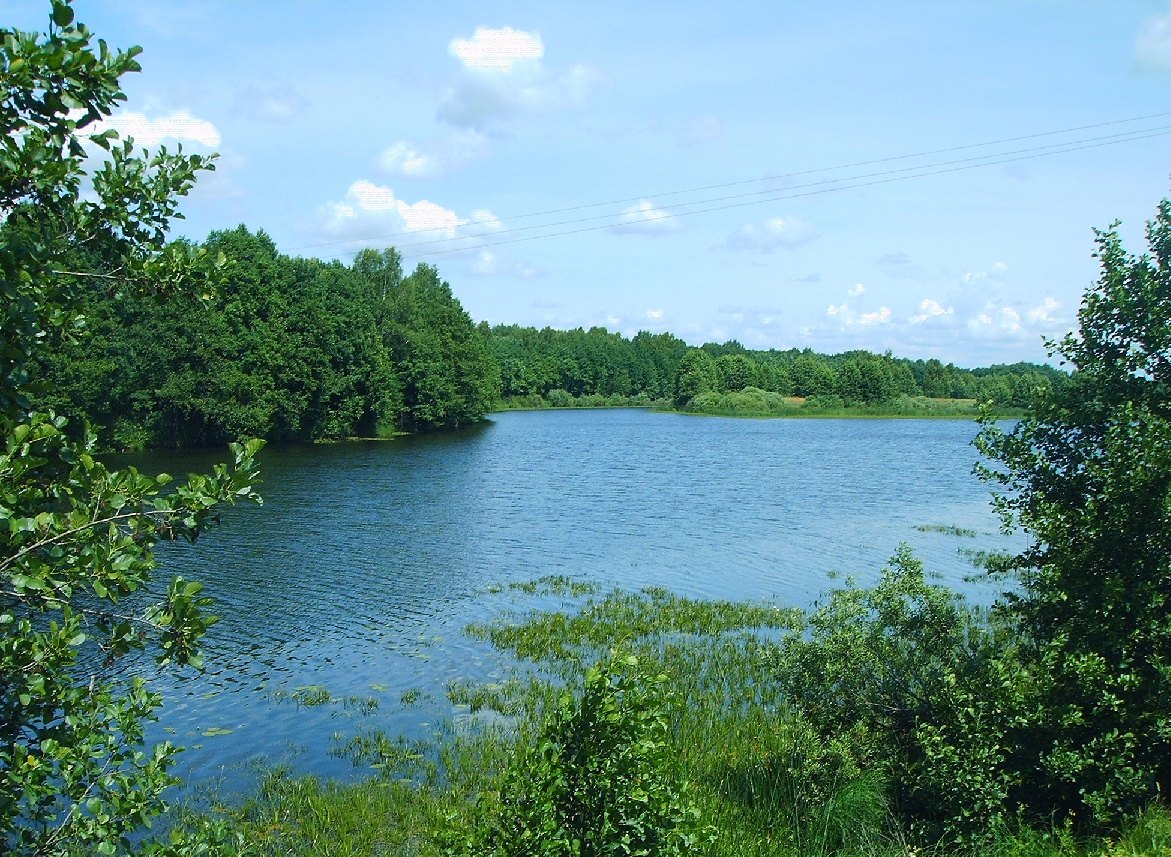
- Lake Shelubey, a protected area of Russia, is located in Tengushevsky District
- Location of Tengushevsky District in the Republic of Mordovia
- Coordinates: 54°46′N 42°43′E
- Country: Russia
- Federal subject: Republic of Mordovia
- Established: 16 July 1928
- Administrative center: Tengushevo

Area
  - Total: 845.94 km^{2} (326.62 sq mi)

Population (2010 Census)
  - Total: 12,340
  - Density: 14.59/km^{2} (37.78/sq mi)
  - Urban: 0%
  - Rural: 100%

Administrative structure
  - Administrative divisions: 10 Selsoviets
  - Inhabited localities: 40 rural localities

Municipal structure
  - Municipally incorporated as: Tengushevsky Municipal District
  - Municipal divisions: 0 urban settlements, 10 rural settlements
- Time zone: UTC+3 (MSK)
- OKTMO ID: 89651000
- Website: http://tengushevo.e-mordovia.ru

Population of Tengushevsky District
- 2010 Census: 12,340
- 2002 Census: 14,286
- 1989 Census: 15,897
- 1979 Census: 17,990

Tengushevsky District (Russian: Теньгу́шевский райо́н; Moksha: Теньгжелень аймак, Teńgželeń ajmak; Erzya: Теньгушбуе, Teńgušbuje) is an administrative and municipal district (raion), one of the twenty-two in the Republic of Mordovia, Russia. It is located in the northwest of the republic. The area of the district is 845.94 square kilometers (326.62 sq mi). Its administrative center is the rural locality (a selo) of Tengushevo.

== Demographics ==
=== Population ===
As of the 2010 Census, the total population of the district was 12,340, with the population of Tengushevo accounting for 34.3% of that number.

== Administrative and municipal status ==
Within the framework of administrative divisions, Tengushevsky District is one of the twenty-two in the republic. The district is divided into ten selsoviets which comprise forty rural localities. As a municipal division, the district is incorporated as Tengushevsky Municipal District. Its ten selsoviets are incorporated into ten rural settlements within the municipal district. The selo of Tengushevo serves as the administrative center of both the administrative and municipal district.

== Notable residents ==
- Alexei Nemov (born 1976 in Barashevo), gymnast
- Aleksandr Sharonov (born 1942 in Shoksha), folklorist
