= Torbeyevo, Republic of Mordovia =

Torbeyevo Торбеево
- Work settlement

Other transcription(s)
  - Moksha: Тарбей
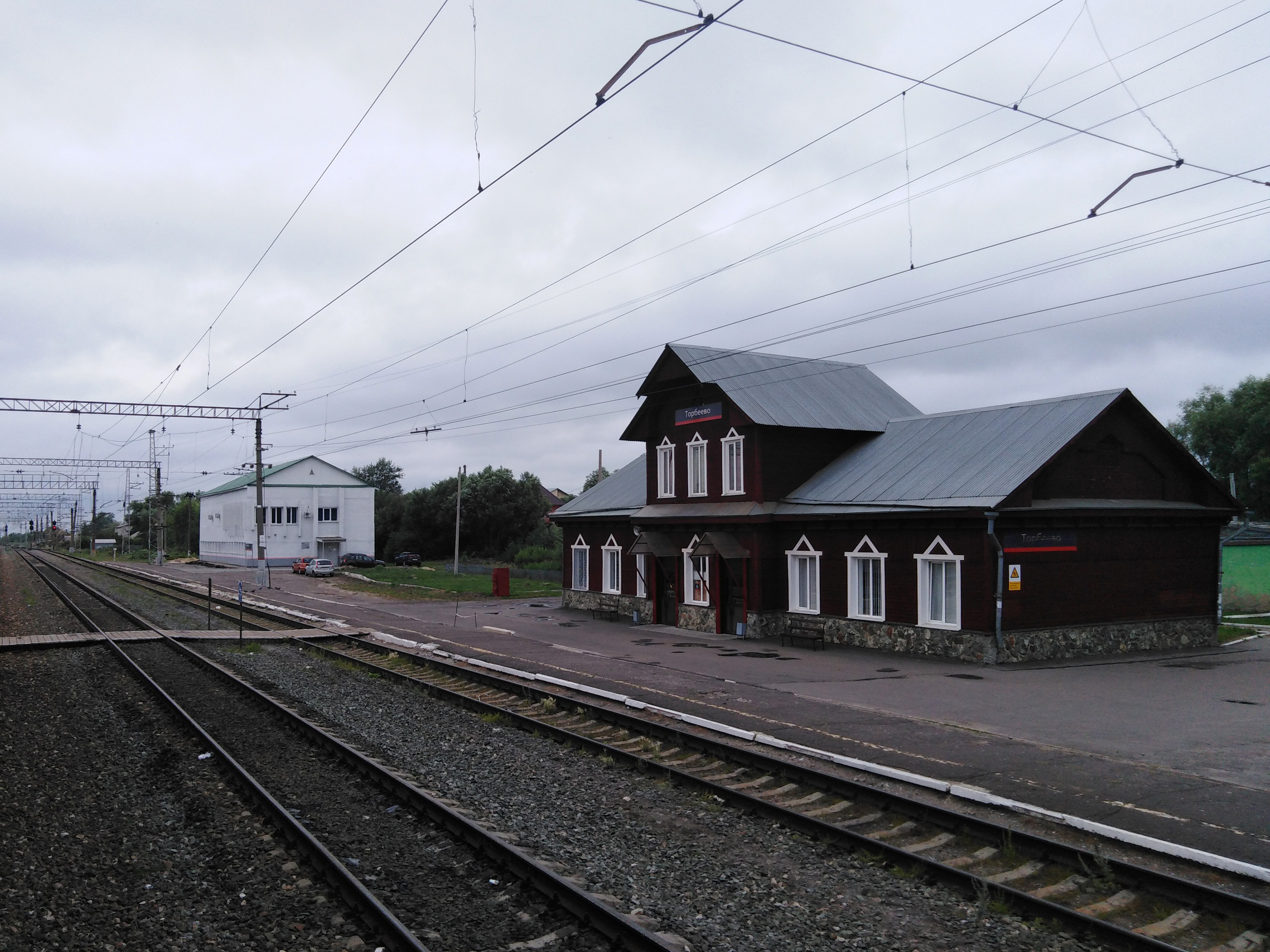
- Torbeyevo railway station
- Interactive map of Torbeyevo
- Location of Torbeyevo Torbeyevo (Republic of Mordovia)
- Coordinates: 54°05′N 43°15′E
- Country: Russia
- Federal subject: Mordovia
- Administrative district: Torbeyevsky District
- Work SettlementSelsoviet: Torbeyevo Work Settlement
- Founded: 1667

Population (2010 Census)
  - Total: 9,373
  - Estimate (2025): 8,922 (−4.8%)

Administrative status
  - Capital of: Torbeyevsky District, Torbeyevo Work Settlement

Municipal status
  - Municipal district: Torbeyevsky Municipal District
  - Urban settlement: Torbeyevskoye Urban Settlement
  - Capital of: Torbeyevsky Municipal District, Torbeyevskoye Urban Settlement
- Time zone: UTC+3 (MSK)
- Postal code: 431029–431031
- OKTMO ID: 89654151051

Torbeyevo population
- 2010 Census: 9,373
- 2002 Census: 9,351
- 1989 Census: 8,924
- 1979 Census: 7,424

Torbeyevo (Russian: Торбе́ево, Moksha: Тарбей, Tarbej) is an urban locality (a work settlement) and the administrative center of Torbeyevsky District in the Republic of Mordovia, Russia. As of the 2010 Census, its population was 9,373.

== Administrative and municipal status ==
Within the framework of administrative divisions, Torbeyevo serves as the administrative center of Torbeyevsky District. As an administrative division, the work settlement of Torbeyevo, together with two rural localities, is incorporated within Torbeyevsky District as Torbeyevo Work Settlement. As a municipal division, Torbeyevo Work Settlement is incorporated within Torbeyevsky Municipal District as Torbeyevskoye Urban Settlement.

== Climate ==
Torbeyevo has a humid continental climate (Köppen climate classification Dfb) with long, cold winters and warm summers. A heat wave in the months of June, July, and August 2010, raised temperatures from previous norms often by 15 °C (27 °F) in Torbeyevo. Some of the higher fluctuations in temperatures were recorded with seven straight days of temperatures +40 °C (104 °F) and higher compared to the previous year where the higher temperatures for the same period were, on average, 20 °C (36 °F) lower.

Climate data for Torbeyevo, 1981–2010 normals, extremes 1960–present
Month	Jan	Feb	Mar	Apr	May	Jun	Jul	Aug	Sep	Oct	Nov	Dec	Year
Record high °C (°F)	4.8 (40.6)	8.5 (47.3)	13.0 (55.4)	27.3 (81.1)	32.0 (89.6)	36.8 (98.2)	39.2 (102.6)	40.8 (105.4)	33.6 (92.5)	22.4 (72.3)	15.1 (59.2)	9.0 (48.2)	40.8 (105.4)
Mean daily maximum °C (°F)	−5.0 (23.0)	−4.0 (24.8)	0.0 (32.0)	12.0 (53.6)	20.0 (68.0)	23.0 (73.4)	25.0 (77.0)	23.0 (73.4)	17.0 (62.6)	10.0 (50.0)	1.0 (33.8)	−4.0 (24.8)	9.8 (49.6)
Daily mean °C (°F)	−8.0 (17.6)	−8.0 (17.6)	−3.0 (26.6)	7.0 (44.6)	14.0 (57.2)	18.0 (64.4)	19.5 (67.1)	18.0 (64.4)	12.5 (54.5)	6.5 (43.7)	−1.0 (30.2)	−6.5 (20.3)	5.9 (42.6)
Mean daily minimum °C (°F)	−11.0 (12.2)	−12.0 (10.4)	−6.0 (21.2)	2.0 (35.6)	8.0 (46.4)	13.0 (55.4)	14.0 (57.2)	13.0 (55.4)	8.0 (46.4)	3.0 (37.4)	−3.0 (26.6)	−9.0 (15.8)	1.7 (35.1)
Record low °C (°F)	−41.4 (−42.5)	−35.8 (−32.4)	−30.8 (−23.4)	−11.1 (12.0)	−2.0 (28.4)	0.8 (33.4)	5.1 (41.2)	1.0 (33.8)	−6.4 (20.5)	−17.6 (0.3)	−30.8 (−23.4)	−42.0 (−43.6)	−42.0 (−43.6)
Average precipitation mm (inches)	43 (1.7)	34 (1.3)	30 (1.2)	29 (1.1)	49 (1.9)	63 (2.5)	64 (2.5)	59 (2.3)	56 (2.2)	48 (1.9)	52 (2.0)	47 (1.9)	574 (22.6)
Average precipitation days (≥ 0.1 mm)	15.7	12.7	12.8	11.7	13.0	17.0	15.2	13.3	11.8	12.9	13.3	15.5	164.9
Source: Pogoda.ru.net

== Notable people ==
It is the birthplace of Mikhail Devyatayev, who was born here in 1917.
