= Erzya language =

Uralic language spoken in Russia

Erzya
- Erzyan
- эрзянь кель eŕźań keĺ
- Pronunciation: [ˈerʲzʲanʲ ˈkʲelʲ]
- Native to: Russia
- Region: Mordovia, Nizhny Novgorod, Chuvashia, Ulyanovsk, Samara, Penza, Saratov, Orenburg, Tatarstan, Bashkortostan
- Ethnicity: 610,000 Erzyas (553,000 in Russia, 2010 census)
- Native speakers: 46,000 (2020 census)
- Language family: Uralic: Mordvinic; Erzya
- Writing system: Cyrillic

Official status
- Official language in: Mordovia (Russia)

Language codes
- ISO 639-2: myv
- ISO 639-3: myv
- Glottolog: erzy1239
- ELP: Erzya
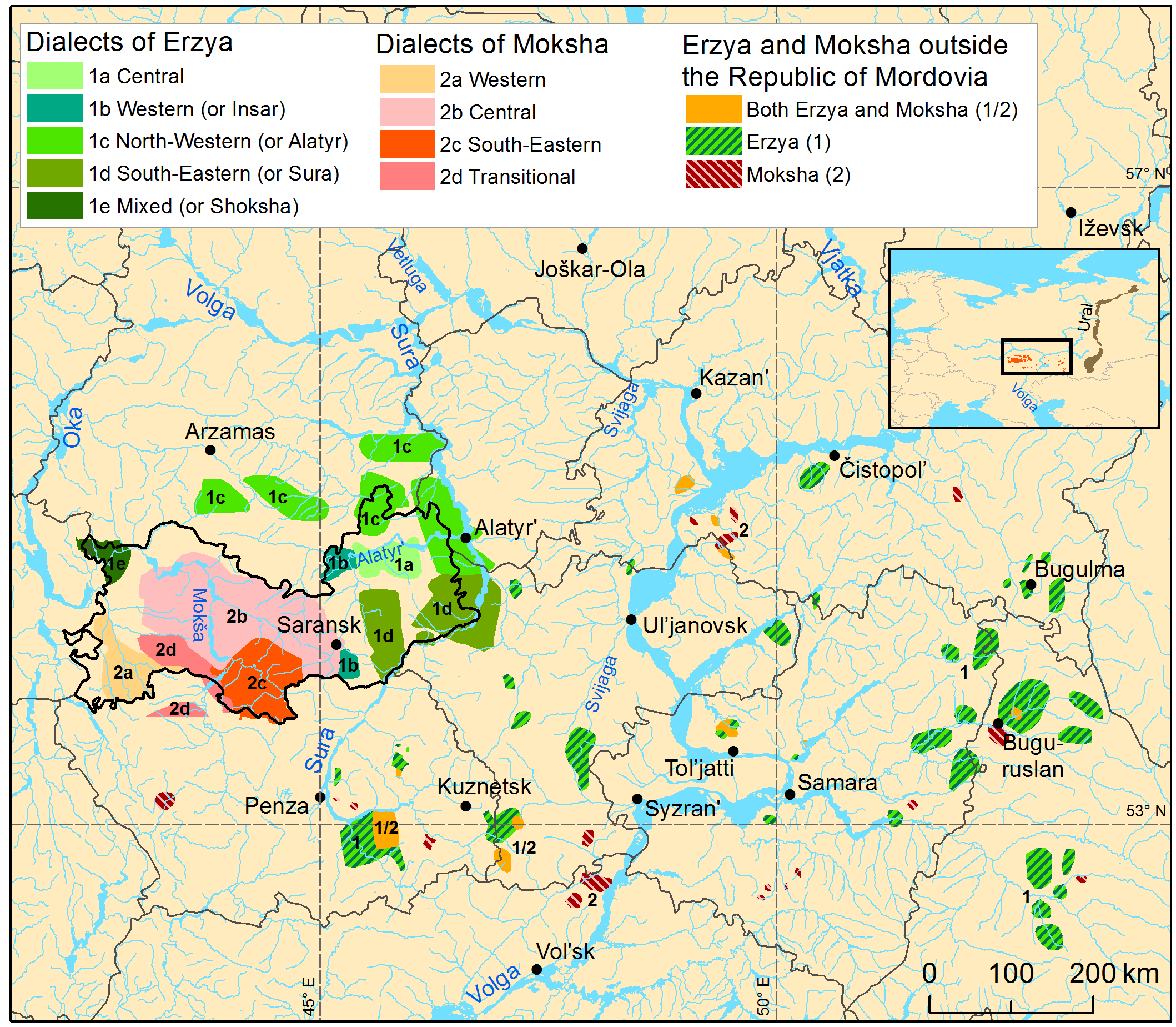
- Mordvin languages at the beginning of the 20th century

- Erzya is classified as Definitely Endangered by the UNESCO Atlas of the World's Languages in Danger (2010)

Erzya flag

The Erzya language (эрзянь кель, eŕźań keĺ, pronounced [ˈerʲzʲanʲ ˈkʲelʲ]), also Erzian or historically Arisa, is spoken by approximately 300,000 people in the northern, eastern and north-western parts of the Republic of Mordovia and adjacent regions of Nizhny Novgorod, Chuvashia, Penza, Samara, Saratov, Orenburg, Ulyanovsk, Tatarstan and Bashkortostan in Russia. A diaspora can also be found in Armenia and Estonia, as well as in Kazakhstan and other states of Central Asia. Erzya is currently written using Cyrillic with no modifications to the variant used by the Russian language. In Mordovia, Erzya is co-official with Moksha and Russian.

The language belongs to the Mordvinic branch of the Uralic languages. Erzya is a language that is closely related to Moksha but has distinct phonetics, morphology and vocabulary.

== Phonology ==
=== Consonants ===
The following table lists the consonant phonemes of Erzya together with their Cyrillic equivalents.

		Labial	Alveolar		(Palato-) alveolar	Velar
		Labial	plain	pal.	(Palato-) alveolar	Velar
Nasal		/m/ м	/n/ н	/nʲ/ нь		/ŋ/ н
Plosive	voiceless	/p/ п	/t/ т	/tʲ/ ть		/k/ к
Plosive	voiced	/b/ б	/d/ д	/dʲ/ дь		/ɡ/ г
Affricate			/t͡s/ ц	/t͡sʲ/ ць	/t͡ʃ/ ч	
Fricative	voiceless	(/f/ ф)	/s/ с	/sʲ/ сь	/ʃ/ ш	(/x/ х)
Fricative	voiced	/v/ в	/z/ з	/zʲ/ зь	/ʒ/ ж	
Trill			/r/ р	/rʲ/ рь		
Approximant			/l/ л	/lʲ/ ль	/j/ й	

Palatalization is widespread in Erzya, but is contrastive only for the alveolar consonants. The labial and velar consonants have palatalized allophones before the front vowels /i/, /e/. The pairs /t/ – /tʲ/, /d/ – /dʲ/ and /n/ – /nʲ/ also often alternate depending on a following or preceding back vs. front vowel. E.g. the 1st person singular possessive suffix has allomorphs such as /-enʲ/ and /-on/. The palatalized consonants can natively occur also in a back vowel environment, e.g. the genitive suffix /-nʲ/, providing minimal pairs such as кудон /kudon/ 'my house' – кудонь /kudonʲ/ '(a) house's'. Non-palatalized /t/, /d/, /n/ in a front vowel environment are limited to recent Russian loans such as кит /kit/ 'whale'.

Note on romanized transcription: in Uralic studies, the members of the palatalized series are usually spelled as ⟨ń⟩, ⟨ť⟩, ⟨ď⟩, ⟨ć⟩, ⟨ś⟩, ⟨ź⟩, ⟨ŕ⟩, ⟨ľ⟩, while the postalveolar sounds are spelled ⟨č⟩, ⟨š⟩, ⟨ž⟩ (see Uralic Phonetic Alphabet).

/f/ and /x/ are loan phonemes from Russian. There is a phonemic contrast between /n/ and /ŋ/, despite that they share the standard spelling ⟨н⟩. Minimal pairs include:

- /janɡa/ "along the path", in which the alveolar /n/ of the stem is retained before the prolative case ending /ɡa/, vs. /jaŋɡa/, the connegative form of the verb /jaŋɡams/ "to break"
- /jonks/ "good", subject or object complement in /ks/ translative, vs. /joŋks/ "direction; area". See Rueter 2010: 58.

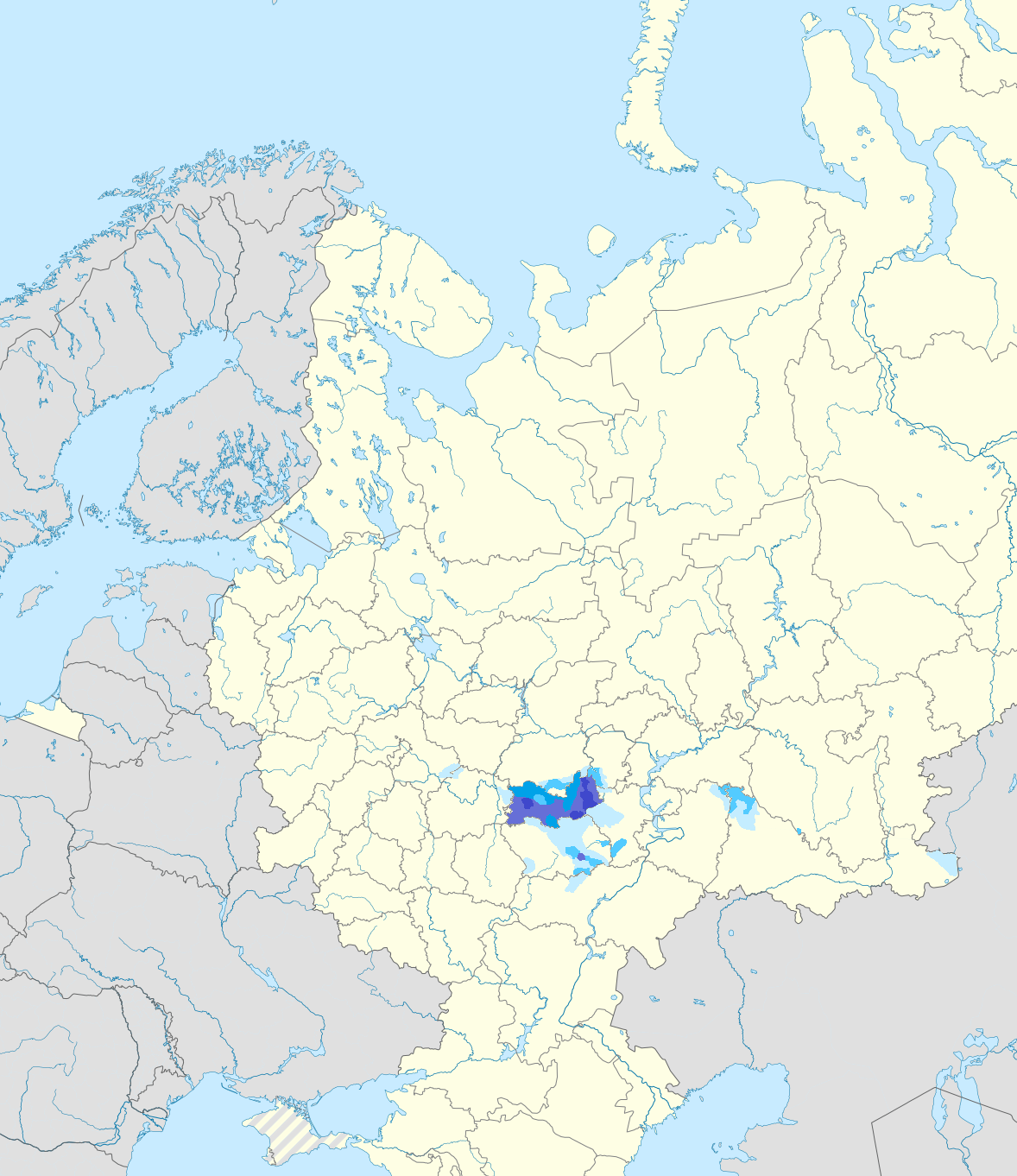
Mordovians in European Russia

=== Vowels ===
Erzya has a simple five-vowel system.

	Front	Back
High	i	u
Mid	e	o
Low	a	

The front vowels /i/ and /e/ have centralized variants [ï] and [ë] immediately following a plain alveolar consonant, e.g. siń [sïnʲ] "they", seń [sënʲ] "blue".

=== Vowel harmony ===
As in many other Uralic languages, Erzya has vowel harmony. Most roots contain either front vowels (/i/, /e/) or back vowels (/u/, /o/). In addition, all suffixes with mid vowels have two forms: the form to be used is determined by the final syllable of the stem. The low vowel (/a/), found in the comparative case -шка (ška) "the size of" and the prolative -ка/-га/-ва (ka/ga/va) "spatial multipoint used with verbs of motion as well as position" is a back vowel and not subject to vowel harmony.

The rules of vowel harmony are as follows:

1. If the final syllable of the word stem contains a front vowel, the front form of the suffix is used: веле (veĺe) "village", велесэ (veĺese) "in a village"
2. If the final syllable of the word stem contains a back vowel, and it is followed by plain (non-palatalized) consonants, the back form of the suffix is used: кудо (kudo) "house", кудосо (kudoso) "in a house"

However, if the back vowel is followed by a palatalized consonant or palatal glide, vowel harmony is violated and the "front" form of the suffix is used: кальсэ (kaĺse) "with willow", ойсэ (ojse) "with butter". Likewise, if a front-vowel stem is followed by a low back vowel suffix, subsequent syllables will contain back harmony: велеванзо (veĺevanzo) "throughout its villages"

Thus the seeming violations of vowel harmony attested in stems, e.g. узере (uźere) "axe", суре (suŕe) "thread (string)", are actually due to the palatalized consonants /zʲ/ and /rʲ/.

One exception to front-vowel harmony is observed in palatalized non-final /lʲ/, e.g. асфальтсо (asfaĺtso) "with asphalt".

== Writing ==
=== Cyrillic alphabet ===
The modern Erzya alphabet is the same as for Russian:

А /a/	Б /b/	В /v/	Г /ɡ/	Д /d/	Е /je/	Ё /jo/	Ж /ʒ/	З /z/	И /i/	Й /j/
К /k/	Л /l/	М /m/	Н /n/	О /o/	П /p/	Р /r/	С /s/	Т /t/	У /u/	Ф /f/
Х /x/	Ц /t͡s/	Ч /t͡ʃ/	Ш /ʃ/	Щ /ʃt͡ʃ/	Ъ /-/	Ы /ɨ/	Ь /◌ʲ/	Э /e/	Ю /ju/	Я /ja/

The letters ф, х, щ and ъ are only used in loanwords from Russian. The pre-1929 version of the Erzya alphabet included the additional letter Cyrillic ligature En Ge (Ҥ ҥ) in some publications, (cf. Evsevyev 1928).

In combination with the alveolar consonants т, д, ц, с, з, н, л, and р, vowel letters are employed to distinguish between plain and palatalized articulations in a similar way as in Russian: а, э, ы, о, у follow plain alveolars, while я, е, и, ё, ю follow palatalized alveolars, e.g. та /ta/, тэ /te/, ты /ti/, то /to/, ту /tu/ vs. тя /tʲa/, те /tʲe/, ти /tʲi/, тё /tʲo/, тю /tʲu/. If no vowel follows, palatalization is indicated by ь, e.g. ть /tʲ/. Following non-alveolar consonants, only а, е, и, о, у occur, e.g. па /pa/, пе /pe/, пи /pi/, по /po/, пу /pu/.

=== Latin alphabet ===
A Latin alphabet was officially approved by the government of Nizhne-Volzhskiy Kray in 1932, but it was never used:

a в c ç d ә e f g y i j k l m n o p r s ş t u v x z ƶ ь

One of the modern Latin alphabet proposals:

a b c č ć d d́/ď e f g h i j k l ĺ/ľ m n ń o p r ŕ s š ś t t́/ť u v z ž ź

Cyrillic	Latin
а	a
б	b
в	v
г	g
д	before e,ë,и,ь,ю,я — d́/ď
д	not before e,ë,и,ь,ю,я — d
е	at the beginning of a word — je
е	after a vowel — je
е	after a consonant — e
ё	at the beginning of a word — jo
ё	after a vowel — jo
ё	after a consonant — o
ж	ž
з	before e,ë,и,ь,ю,я — ź
з	not before e,ë,и,ь,ю,я — z
и	at the beginning of a word — i
и	after a consonant — i
и	after a vowel — ji
й	j
к	k
л	before e,ë,и,ь,ю,я — ĺ/ľ
л	not before e,ë,и,ь,ю,я — l
м	m
н	before e,ë,и,ь,ю,я — ń
н	not before e,ë,и,ь,ю,я — n
о	o
п	р
р	before e,ë,и,ь,ю,я — ŕ
р	not before e,ë,и,ь,ю,я — r
с	before e,ë,и,ь,ю,я — ś
с	not before e,ë,и,ь,ю,я — s
т	before e,ë,и,ь,ю,я — t́/ť
т	not before e,ë,и,ь,ю,я — t
у	u
ф	f (only in loanwords)
х	h (only in loanwords)
ц	before e,ë,и,ь,ю,я — ć
ц	not before e,ë,и,ь,ю,я — c
ч	č
ш	š
щ	šč/šť (only in loanwords)
ъ	–
ы	i
ь	–
э	e
ю	at the beginning of a word — ju
ю	after a vowel — ju
ю	after a consonant — u
я	at the beginning of a word — ja
я	after a vowel — ja
я	after a consonant — a

== Morphology ==
Like all other Uralic languages, Erzya is an agglutinative language which expresses grammatical relations by means of suffixes.

=== Nouns ===
Nouns are inflected for case, number, definiteness and possessor. Erzya distinguishes twelve cases (here illustrated with the noun мода moda "ground, earth"). Number is systematically distinguished only with definite nouns; for indefinite nouns and nouns with a possessive suffix, only the nominative case has a distinct plural.

Case	Indefinite		Definite		1SG possessive		2SG possessive	3SG possessive	
Case	singular	plural	singular	plural	singular	plural	singular/plural	singular	plural
nominative	мода moda	мода-т moda-t	мода-сь moda-ś	мода-тне moda-tńe	мода-м moda-m	мода-н moda-n	мода-т moda-t	мода-зo moda-zo	мода-нзo moda-nzo
genitive	мода-нь moda-ń		мода-нть moda-ńt́	мода-тне-нь moda-tńe-ń	мода-м moda-m	мода-н moda-n	мода-т moda-t	мода-зo moda-zo	мода-нзo moda-nzo
dative/allative	мода-нень moda-ńeń		мода-нтень moda-ńt́eń	мода-тне-нень moda-tńe-ńeń	мода-м moda-m	мода-н moda-n	мода-т moda-t	мода-зo moda-zo	мода-нзo moda-nzo
inessive	мода-со moda-so		мода-сонть moda-sońt́	мода-тне-сэ moda-tńe-se	мода-со-н moda-so-n		мода-со-т moda-so-t	мода-со-нзo moda-so-nzo	
elative	мода-сто moda-sto		мода-стонть moda-stońt́	мода-тне-стэ moda-tńe-ste	мода-сто-н moda-sto-n		мода-сто-т moda-sto-t	мода-сто-нзo moda-sto-nzo	
illative	мода-с moda-s		мода-нтень moda-ńt́eń	мода-тне-с moda-tńe-s	мода-з-oн moda-z-on		мода-з-oт moda-z-ot	мода-з-oнзo moda-z-onzo	
prolative	мода-ва moda-va		мода-ванть moda-vańt́	мода-тне-ва moda-tńe-va	мода-ва-н moda-va-n		мода-ва-т moda-va-t	мода-ва-нзo moda-va-nzo	
ablative	мода-до moda-do		мода-донть moda-dońt́	мода-тне-дe moda-tńe-d́e	мода-до-н moda-do-n		мода-до-т moda-do-t	мода-до-нзo moda-do-nzo	
lative	мода-в moda-v		—N/a	—N/a	—N/a		—N/a	—N/a	
translative	мода-кс moda-ks		мода-ксонть moda-ksońt́	мода-тне-кс moda-tńe-ks	мода-кс-oн moda-ks-on		мода-кс-oт moda-ks-ot	мода-кс-oнзo moda-ks-onzo	
abessive	мода-втомо moda-vtomo		мода-втомонть moda-vtomońt́	мода-тне-втеме moda-tńe-vt́eme	мода-втомо-н moda-vtomo-n		мода-втомо-т moda-vtomo-t	мода-втомо-нзo moda-vtomo-nzo	
comparative	мода-шка moda-ška		мода-шканть moda-škańt́	мода-тне-шка moda-tńe-ška	мода-шка-н moda-ška-n		мода-шка-т moda-ška-t	мода-шка-нзo moda-ška-nzo	

Plural possessors follow the pattern of second person singular possessors.

Case	1PL.POSS	2PL.POSS	3PL.POSS
Case	singular/plural	singular/plural	singular/plural
nominative	мода-нoк moda-nok	мода-нк moda-nk	мода-ст moda-st
inessive (...)	мода-со-нoк moda-so-nok (...)	мода-со-нк moda-so-nk (...)	мода-со-ст moda-so-st (...)

=== Verbs ===
Erzya verbs are inflected for tense and mood, and are further conjugated for person of subject and object. Traditionally, three stem types are distinguished: a-stems, o-stems and e-stems. A-stems always retain the stem vowel a in the non-third-person present-tense forms, and in the third-person first past-tense forms (e.g. pala-ś "kissed"). With many o-stems and e-stems, the stem vowel is dropped in these forms (e.g. o-stem van-ś "watched", e-stem ńiĺ-ś "swallowed"), but there also o- and e-stem verbs which retain the vowel (udo-ś "slept", pid́e-ś "cooked"). Rueter (2010) therefore divides verb stems into vowel-retaining stems and vowel-dropping stems.

In indicative mood, three tenses are distinguished: present/future, first past, second (=habitual) past.

indicative mood
		present/future tense			first past tense		second past tense
		a-stem	o-stem	e-stem	a-stem	e-stem	e-stem
		'sing'	'watch'	'swallow'	'know'	'say'	'see'
1st person	singular	мора-н mora-n	ван-ан van-an	пил-ян piĺ-an	сод-ы-нь sod-i-ń	мер-и-нь meŕ-i-ń	неи-линь ńej-i-ĺiń
1st person	plural	мора-тано mora-tano	ван-тано van-tano	пиль-тяно piĺ-t́ano	сод-ы-нек sod-i-ńek	мер-и-нек meŕ-i-ńek	неи-линек ńej-i-ĺińek
2nd person	singular	мора-т mora-t	ван-ат van-at	пил-ят piĺ-at	сод-ы-ть sod-i-t́	мер-и-ть meŕ-i-t́	неи-лить ńej-i-ĺit́
2nd person	plural	мора-тадо mora-tado	ван-тадо van-tado	пиль-тядо piĺ-t́ado	сод-ы-де sod-i-d́e	мер-и-де meŕ-i-d́e	неи-лиде ńej-i-ĺid́e
3rd person	singular	мор-ы mor-i	ван-ы van-i	пил-и piĺ-i	содa-сь soda-ś	мер-сь meŕ-ś	неи-ль ńej-i-ĺ
3rd person	plural	мор-ыть mor-it́	ван-ыть van-it́	пил-ить piĺ-it́	содa-сть soda-śt́	мер-сть meŕ-śt́	неи-льть ńej-i-ĺt́
infinitive	first	мора-мс mora-ms	вано-мс vano-ms	пиле-мс piĺe-ms	сода-мс soda-ms	мере-мс meŕe-ms	нее-мс ńeje-ms
infinitive	second	мора-мо mora-mo	вано-мо vano-mo	пиле-ме piĺe-me	сода-мо soda-mo	мере-ме meŕe-me	нее-ме ńeje-me

The third-person singular form in the present tense is also used as present participle. The second past tense is formed by adding the past-tense copula -ĺ to the present participle.

The other mood categories are:

- conditional (-ińd́eŕa + present suffixes)
- conjunctive (-v(V)ĺ + past suffixes)
- conditional-conjunctive (-ińd́eŕa-v(V)ĺ + past suffixes)
- desiderative (-ikseĺ + past suffixes)
- optative (zo + present suffixes)
- imperative (-k/-do)

other mood categories
		conditional	conjunctive	conditional-conjunctive	desiderative
		'eat'	'win'	'be'	'sow'
1st person	singular	ярс-ындеря-н jars-ińd́eŕa-n	изня-влинь iźńa-vĺiń	ул-индеря-влинь uĺ-ińd́eŕa-vĺiń	вид-иксэлинь vid́-ikseĺiń
1st person	plural	ярс-ындеря-тано jars-ińd́eŕa-tano	изня-влинек iźńa-vĺińek	ул-индеря-влинек uĺ-ińd́eŕa-vĺińek	вид-иксэлинек vid́-ikseĺińek
2nd person	singular	ярс-ындеря-т jars-ińd́eŕa-t	изня-влить iźńa-vĺit́	ул-индеря-влить uĺ-ińd́eŕa-vĺit́	вид-иксэлить vid́-ikseĺit́
2nd person	plural	ярс-ындеря-тадо jars-ińd́eŕa-tado	изня-влиде iźńa-vĺid́e	ул-индеря-влиде uĺ-ińd́eŕa-vĺid́e	вид-иксэлиде vid́-ikseĺid́e
3rd person	singular	ярс-ындеря-й jars-ińd́eŕa-j	изня-воль iźńa-voĺ	ул-индеря-воль uĺ-ińd́eŕa-voĺ	вид-иксэль vid́-ikseĺ
3rd person	plural	ярс-ындеря-йть jars-ińd́eŕa-jt́	изня-вольть iźńa-voĺt́	ул-индеря-вольть uĺ-ińd́eŕa-voĺt́	вид-иксэльть vid́-ikseĺt́
infinitive	first	ярса-мс jarsa-ms	изня-мс iźńa-ms	уле-мс uĺe-ms	виде-мс vid́e-ms
infinitive	second	ярса-мо jarsa-mo	изня-мо iźńa-mo	уле-ме uĺe-me	виде-ме vid́e-me

== Vocabulary ==
Erzya (standard and ä-dialects)	English
Шумбра ульть! (Šumbra uĺt́!)	Hello! (to one person)
Шумбрат уледе! (Šumbrat uĺed́e!)	Hello! (to multiple people)
Кода тонь леметь? (Koda toń ĺemet́?) or ...лӓметь? (...ĺämet́?)	What is your name?
Монь лемем ___. (Moń ĺemem ___.) or ...лӓмем ___. (...ĺämem ___.)	My name is ____.
Сюконян! (Śukońan!)	Thank you
Вастомазонок (Vastomazonok)	Goodbye
ава (ava)	woman
ломань (lomań)	man, person
эйкакш (ejkakš) or ӓйкакш (...äjkakš)	child
ялга (jalga), оя (oja)	friend
тетя (t́et́a) or тӓтя (t́ät́a)	father
ава (ava)	mother
цёра (ćora)	boy
тейтерь (t́ejt́eŕ) or тӓйтерь (t́äjt́eŕ)	girl
кудо (kudo)	house
ош (oš)	city
мастор (mastor)	land
килей (kiĺej)	birch tree
лей (ĺej)	river
вирь (viŕ)	forest
эрьке (eŕke)	lake
кинига (kińiga)	book
столь (stoĺ), тувор (tuvor)	table
киска (kiska), пине (pińe)	dog
псака (psaka), катка (katka)	cat
ракша (rakša)	animal
овто (ovto)	bear
кал (kal)	fish

== Sample text ==
Erzya (Cyrillic)	Erzya (Transliteration)	English
Весе ломантне чачить олякс, ёнчинзэ ды праванзо коряс вейкетекс. Сынст улить превест ды чамачист, вейкень-вейкень коряс пряст сыненст ветяма ялгань ёжо марто.	Veśe lomańt́ńe čačit́ oĺaks, jončinze di pravanzo koŕas vejket́eks. Sinst uĺit́ pŕevest di čamačist, vejkeń-vejkeń koŕas pŕańt́ sinenst vet́ama jalgań jožo marto.	All human beings are born free and equal in dignity and rights. They are endowed with reason and conscience and should act towards one another in a spirit of brotherhood.

== See also ==
- Erzya people
- Erzya literature
- Erzyan Mastor

== Bibliography ==
- A.I. Bryzhinskiy, O.V. Pashutina, Ye.I. Chernov. Писатели Мордовии Биобиблиографический справочник. Saransk: Mordovskoye Knizhnoye Izdatelystvo, 2001. ISBN 5-7595-1386-9.
- Vasilij D'omin. Сюконян тенк... Эрзянь писательде ёвтнемат. Saransk, 2005. ISBN 5-7595-1665-5.
- Ksenija Djordjevic & Jean-Leo Leonard. Parlons Mordve. Paris: L'Harmattan, 2006, ISBN 2-296-00147-5.
- Makar E. Evsev'ev. Основы мордовской грамматика, Эрзянь грамматика. С приложением образцов мокшанских склонений и спряжений. Москва: Центральное издательство народов СССР, 1928.
- Jack Rueter. Adnominal Person in the Morphological System of Erzya. Suomalais-Ugrilaisen Seuran Toimituksia 261. Helsinki: Suomalais-Ugrilainen Seura, 2010, ISBN 978-952-5667-23-3 [print], ISBN 978-952-5667-24-0 [online].
- D.V. Tsygankin. Память запечатленная в слове: Словарь географических названий республики Мордовия. Saransk, 2005. ISBN 5-7493-0780-8.
