= Abkhaz traditional religion =

Ethnic religion of the Abkhaz people

Abkhaz neopaganism, or the Abkhaz native religion, is the contemporary re-emergence of the ethnic religion of the Abkhaz people in unrecognized Abkhazia, a revitalisation which started in the 1980s. The most important holy sites of the religion are the Seven Shrines of Abkhazia, each one having its own priestly clan, where rituals and prayers began to be restored in the 1990s.

According to the 2003 census, 8% of the population of Abkhazia adheres to Abkhaz neopaganism. On 3 August 2012 the Council of Priests of Abkhazia was formally constituted in Sukhumi. The possibility of making the Abkhaz native religion one of the state religions was discussed in the following months.

== History ==
The traditional Abkhaz religion was actually never completely wiped out; circles of priests, whose activity was kept secret, passed on traditional knowledge and rites in the times when Christianity and Islam became dominant in the region, and later in Soviet times of anti-religion. Such priests continued the worship of deities such as the thunder god Afy and the supreme god Antsua.

Since the 1980s, and later in the 1990s after the collapse of the Soviet Union, the Abkhaz native religion was resurrected by the joint efforts of priests who began to resurface, rural people reactivating local rituals, and urban intellectuals supporting Paganism as an integral part for a reawakening of the Abkhaz ethnic and cultural identity.

A turning point for the revival of the Abkhaz native religion came with the Georgian–Abkhazian conflict. With tensions growing, more and more Abkhazians began associating Orthodox Christianity with the Georgians, and chose to reject it, turning to the native gods. The eventual victory of Abkhazia in the 1992–93 war with Georgia catalyzed the Neopagan revival. Many Abkhaz believe that their national god Dydrypsh awarded them the victory.

Since then the Abkhaz native religion has been protected by Abkhaz authorities. Government officials took part in a bull sacrifice in October 1993 celebrated to thank the Lord Dydrypsh for the victory over the Georgians, and since then they regularly take part in worship rituals.

== See also ==
- Council of Priests of Abkhazia
- Seven Shrines of Abkhazia

Caucasian religions

- Adyghe Habzism
- Assianism

Indo-European religions

- Etseg Din
- Rodnovery

Turkic religions

- Tengrism
- Vattisen Yaly

Uralic religions

- Estonian neopaganism
- Finnish neopaganism
- Mari Native Religion
- Mordvin Native Religion
- Udmurt Vos

== Bibliography ==
- Filatov, S; Shchipkov, A (1996), "Поволжские народы в поисках национальной веры (Povolzhskie narody v poiskakh natsional'noi very) [Volga region peoples in search of national faith]", in Filatov, SB (ed.), Религия и права человека: На пути к свободе совести (Religiia i prava cheloveka: Na puti k svobode sovesti) [Religion and Human Rights: Towards Freedom of Conscience] (in Russian), Moscow: Nauka, pp. 256–84.
- Krylov, AB (1998a), "Абхазское святилище Дыдрыпш: прошлое, настоящее и устная традиция (Abkhazskoe sviatilishche Dydrypsh: proshloe, nastoiashchee i ustnaia traditsiia)" [Abkhaz sanctuary Dydrypsh: Past, Present and oral tradition], Этнограрусское обозрение (Etnogra cheskoe obozrenie) [Ethnography review] (in Russian), 6: 16–28.
- ——— (1998b), "Дыдрыпш-ныха: святилище Абхазов (Dydrypsh-nykha: sviatilishche abkhazov)" [Dydrypsh-nykha: sanctuary Abkhazes], Азия и Африка сегодня (Aziia i Afrika segodnia) [Asia & Africa today] (in Russian), 6: 55–58 & 7, 1998 b: 54–56.
- ——— (1999), "Абхазия: возрождение святилища (Abkhazia: vozrozhdenie sviatilishcha)" [Abkhazia: the revival of the Sanctuary], Азия и Африка сегодня (Aziia i Afrika segodnia) [Asia & Africa today] (in Russian), 4: 70–72.
- Schnirelmann, Victor (2002), ""Christians! Go home": A Revival of Neo-Paganism between the Baltic Sea and Transcaucasia" (PDF), Journal of Contemporary Religion, 17 (2), CA: WLU, archived from the original (PDF) on 22 September 2014.
- Kuznetsov, Igor V. (2018), "Sacred Sites in the Western Caucasus and the Black Sea Region: Typology, Hybridization, Functioning", in Darieva, Tsypylma; Mühlfried, Florian (eds.), Sacred Places, Emerging Spaces: Pilgrims, Saints and Scholars in the Caucasus, Berghahn Press, pp. 97–112.
