= Maavalla Koda =

Organization based in Estonia

Taarausuliste ja Maausuliste Maavalla Koda
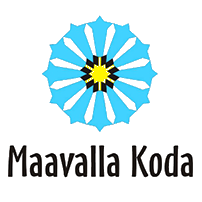
- Formation: 1995
- Type: Non-profit, Estonian native religions
- Location: Tallinn, Estonia
- Members: 1058 (in 2000)
- Key people: Council of Elders
- Website: http://www.maavald.ee/eng/

Maavalla Koda (literally House of the Native Land, short for Taarausuliste ja Maausuliste Maavalla Koda, Estonian House for Taaraist and Native Religion Followers) is a religious organisation uniting adherents of the two kinds of Estonian native religion or Estonian Neopaganism: Taaraism and Maausk.

Maavalla Koda was registered as a union of religious associations (koguduste liit) in Estonia in 1995. The initial constituent members of the union were three local registered religious associations, Emujärve Koda (representing adherents from southern Estonia), Härjapea Koda (with members from the north of the country), and Tartu Supilinna Koda (formed in the university town of Tartu). Later, Tartu Supilinna Koda has been renamed Emajõe Koda (after the river Emajõgi), and the newer association of Maausk adherents of the island Saaremaa, Maausuliste Saarepealne Koda, has been admitted to Maavalla Koda.

On the Estonian military NATO-standard dog tag (identifier), adherents of Taarausk and Maausk are identified with the abbreviation EST. A runic calendar noting festivals of the Estonian traditional religion is published annually by Maavalla Koda. The current focus of activity of Maavalla Koda is on traditional natural sacred sites in Estonia, with the aim of mapping and doing folkloristic research in order to preserve and perpetuate the local traditions relating to these. Along with the University of Tartu, Maavalla Koda co-operates in a government programme initiated to ensure the documentation and protection of natural sacred sites in Estonia.

== Management ==
Maavalla Koda is run by a board of three members – an Elder (vanem), a Warden (vardja), and a Secretary (kirjutaja). The board is elected by the Assembly of Maavalla Koda comprising representatives of local associations.

== Elders of Maavalla Koda ==
- Addold Mossin
- Kalle Eller (acting)
- Anzori Barkalaja
- Andres Heinapuu
- Ahto Kaasik

== Uralic Communion ==
In 2001, Maavalla Koda was one of the founders of an umbrella organisation, the Uralic Communion, founded in order to facilitate co-operation among adherents of Uralic native religions.

Other founders of the Uralic Communion included

- the Mari native religion organisation Oshmari – Chimari,
- Sorta, a research-oriented organisation of Mari native religion,
- Mariz Kemal, leader the Erzya native religion celebration Ras'ken' Ozks, and
- the Association of Finnish Native Religion.
