= Uralic neopaganism =

Contemporary revival of Uralic ethnic religions

Uralic neopaganism encompasses contemporary movements which have been reviving or revitalising the ethnic religions of the various peoples who speak Uralic languages. The movement has taken place since the 1980s and 1990s, after the collapse of the Soviet Union and alongside the ethnonational and cultural reawakening of the Finnic peoples of Russia, the Estonians and the Finns. In fact, Neopagan movements in Finland and Estonia have much older roots, dating from the early 20th century.

Among the Finnic peoples of the Volga Federal District of Russia (the Volga Finns and Udmurts), scholar Victor Schnirelmann has observed two cooperating patterns of development of Neopaganism: the reactivation of authentic rituals and worship ceremonies in the countrysides, and the development of systematised doctrines amongst the urban intelligentsia rejecting Russian Orthodoxy as a foreign religion. The Uralic Communion, founded in 2001, is an organisation for the cooperation of different institutions promoting Uralic indigenous religions.

== Religions ==
=== Estonian native religion ===
The Estonian native religion (Estonian: Maausk, literally "Native Religion" or "Land's Faith"), or Estonian Neopaganism, is the name, in English, for a grouping of contemporary revivals (often called "Neopagan", although adherents of Estonian native religion generally don't use the term) of the indigenous religion of the Estonian people.

It encompasses "Taaraism" (Estonian: Taarausk literally "Taara Faith"), a monistic religion centered on god Tharapita founded in 1928 by intellectuals as a national religion; and Maausk as a much broader definition of "Native Faith", encompassing grassroots movements of local gods worship, nature worship and earth worship. Both the kinds of the movement are administered by the Maavalla Koda organisation. According to a 2002 survey, 11% of the population of Estonia claim that "out of all the religions they have the warmest feelings towards Taaraism and Maausk".

=== Finnish native religion ===
The Tursaansydän, a Finnish Pagan symbol.

The Finnish native religion (Finnish: Suomenusko: "Finnish Faith"), or Finnish Neopaganism, is the contemporary Neopagan revival of Finnish paganism, the pre-Christian polytheistic ethnic religion of the Finns. A precursor movement was the Ukkousko ("Ukko Faith", revolving around the god Ukko) of the early 20th century. The main problem in the revival of Finnish paganism is the nature of pre-Christian Finnish culture, which relied on oral tradition and very little is left. The primary sources concerning Finnish native culture are written by latter-era Christians. They may be biased, tainted or unreliable. The national epic is the Kalevala.

There are two main organisations of the religion, the "Association of Finnish Native Religion" (Suomalaisen kansanuskon yhdistys ry) based in Helsinki and officially registered since 2002, (120 members in 2008) and the "Taivaannaula" association (around a dozen members in 2008) headquartered in Turku with branches in many cities, founded and officially registered in 2007. The Association of Finnish Native Religion also caters to Karelians and is a member of the Uralic Communion.

=== Hungarian native religion ===
Two-barred crosses symbolise the tree of life in Hungarian Native Faith.

The Hungarian Native Faith (Hungarian: Ősmagyar Vallás), also termed Hungarian Neopaganism, is a modern Pagan new religious movement aimed at representing an ethnic religion of the Hungarians, inspired by taltosism (Hungarian shamanism), ancient mythology and later folklore. The Hungarian Native Faith movement has roots in 18th- and 19th-century Enlightenment and Romantic elaborations, and early-20th-century ethnology. The construction of a national Hungarian religion was endorsed in interwar Turanist circles (1930s–1940s), and, eventually, Hungarian Native Faith movements blossomed in Hungary after the fall of the Soviet Union.

The boundaries between Hungarian Native Faith groups are often traced along their differing ideas about the ethnogenetic origins of the Hungarians, which have historically been a matter of debate. Many organisations acknowledge the linguistic connection of Hungarians with speakers of other Finno-Ugric languages. Other Hungarian Native Faith groups, however, cultivate further links with Scythian, Sumerian, Turkic and other cultures.

=== Mari religion ===
The Mari religion (Mari: Чимарий йӱла, Čimarij jüla), also called Mari paganism, is the ethnic religion of the Mari people, a Volga Finnic ethnic group based in the republic of Mari El, in Russia. Mari religion has been practiced predates Christianization attempts, and hence is not itself an example of neopaganism; however it has neopagan revivalist adherents, such as the Kugu sorta.

The Mari religion is based on the worship of the forces of nature, which man must honour and respect. Before the spread of monotheistic teachings amongst the Mari, they worshipped many gods (the jumo, a word cognate to the Finnish Jumala), while recognising the primacy of a "Great God", Kugu Jumo. In the 19th century, influenced by monotheism, the pagan beliefs altered and the image of an Osh Kugu Jumo, literally "Great God of Light", was strengthened.

Subject to persecution in the Soviet Union, the faith has been granted official status since the 1990s by the government of Mari El, where it is recognized as one of the three traditional faiths along with Orthodox Christianity and Islam. Some activists claim that the Mari native religion believers are subject to pressure by Russian authorities as part of a wider campaign to Russify Mari culture. Vitaly Tanakov, an adherent of the faith, was charged with inciting religious, national, social and linguistic hatred after publishing the book The Priest Speaks.

=== Mordvin native religion ===
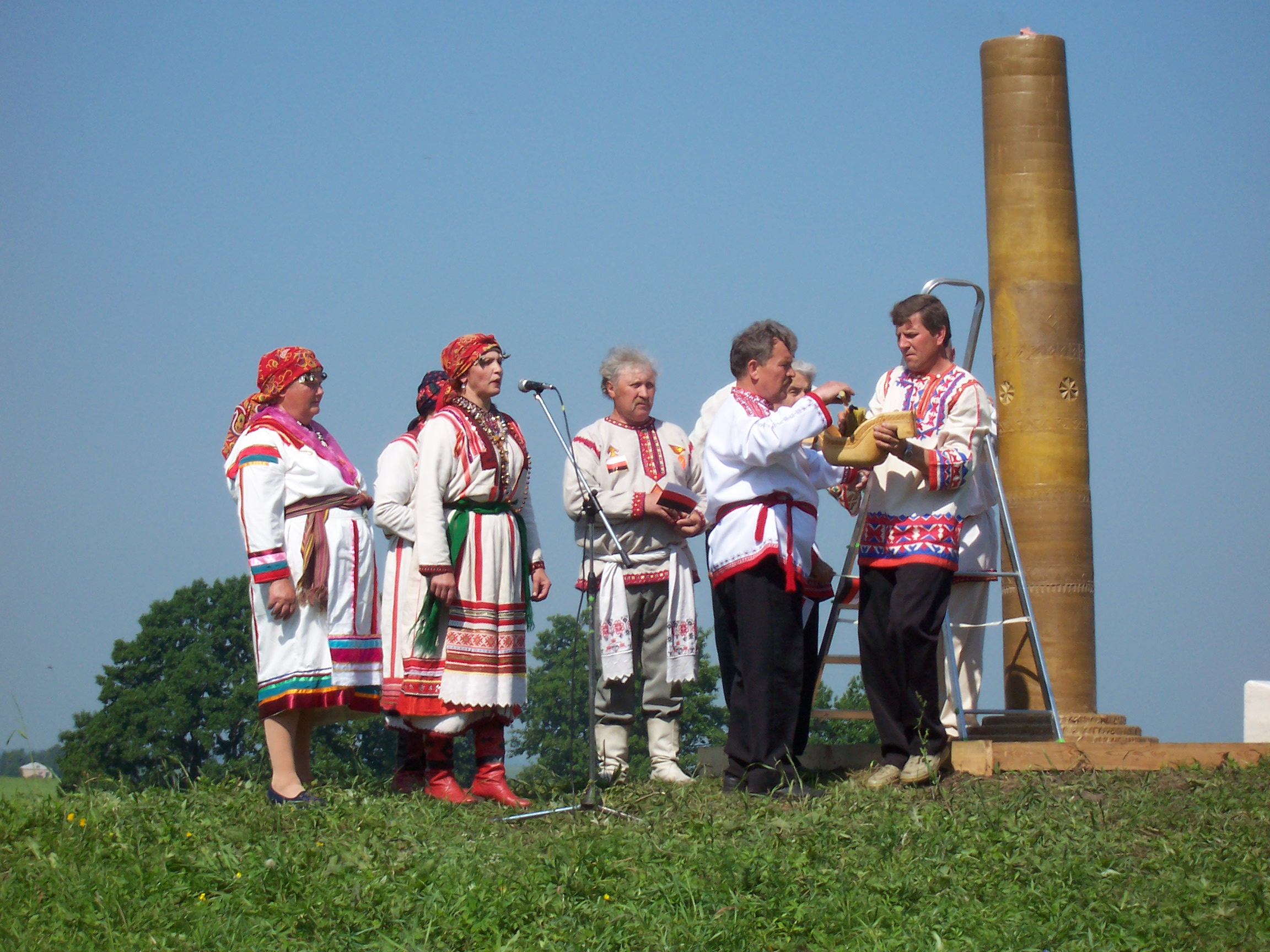
Ritual preparations for the Ras'ken' Ozks, the Mordvin national worship ceremony.

The Mordvin native religion, also called Erzyan native religion, or Mordvin-Erzyan Neopaganism, is the modern revival of the ethnic religion of the Mordvins (Erzya and Moksha), peoples of Volga Finnic ethnic stock dwelling in their republic of Mordovia within Russia, or in bordering lands of Russia. The name of the originating god according to the Mordvin tradition is Ineshkipaz.

The Mordvins were almost fully Christianised since the times of Kievan Rus', although Pagan customs were preserved in the folklore and few villages preserved utterly the native faith at least until further missionary activities of the Russian Orthodox Church in the 17th century and in the early 20th century. The Neopagan revival was started in 1990, alongside that of many other native religions in Russia, just in the verge of dissolution of the Soviet Union.

According to scholar Victor Schnirelmann 2% of the Mordvins adhere to the Mordvin native faith. Adherents of the Erzyan Mastor organisation organise the Ras'ken' Ozks (Mordvin for: "Native Prayer"), a national Mordvin worship service held yearly, with participation also of members of the Mastorava organisation and other ones.

=== Udmurt Vosh ===
Udmurt Vosh (Udmurt: Удмурт Вось, literally "Udmurt Faith") is the ethnic religious revival of the Udmurts, a Volga Finnic ethnic group mostly inhabiting their republic within Russia, that is Udmurtia. Amongst the Udmurts, as in other Finnic republics in the Volga region, the revival of Paganism is inextricably intertwined with the revival of national-ethnic culture and awareness.

The Udmurtian Pagan revival circles sprang out of the Demen (Udmurt for "Society") movement which was established in December 1989 for the protection and restoration of the Udmurt ethnic culture. Udmurt Vos as an institution was founded in 1994.

According to 2012 statistics, 2% of the population of Udmurtia adheres to forms of Paganism. Victor Schnirelmann reported an adherence of 4% for the Udmurts alone.

== The Uralic Communion ==
The Uralic Communion was founded in 2001 with the aim of facilitating joint work among adherents of the Uralic native religions. Founding members of the Communion include:

- the Maavalla Koda organisation of Estonian Native Religions;
- the Mari native religion organisation Oshmari – Chimari;
- Sorta, a research-oriented organisation of Mari native religion;
- Mariz Kemal, leader the Erzya native religion celebration Ras'ken' Ozks;
- the Association of Finnish Native Religion.

== See also ==
- Baltic Neopaganism
- Caucasian Neopaganism
- Meryan neopaganism (ru)
- Sámi shamanism
- Slavic Neopaganism
- Tengrism
- Zalmoxianism

== Bibliography ==
- Arola, Iiro: "Ni sit mä tajusin, et on muitakin kuin minä” – Suomenuskoisten sosiaalinen identiteetti. pro gradu -opinnäytetyö. Helsingin yliopisto/ Teologinen tiedekunta, 2010. Teoksen verkkoversio.
- Arola, Iiro: Suomenuskoiset erottautuvat muista uuspakanoista. Teologia.fi. 21.1.2011.
- Filatov, Sergei; Shchipkov, Aleksandr. Religious Developments among the Volga Nations as a Model for the Russian Federation. Religion, State & Society, Vol. 23, No. 3, 1995.
- Filatov, Sergei; Shchipkov Alexander. Udmurtia: Orthodoxy, Paganism, Authority. Religion, State & Society, Vol. 25, No. 2, 1997.
- Napolskikh, Vladimir: Заметки на полях книги «Неоязычество на просторах Евразии» // Acta Eurasica. 2002. № 1.
- Rein Taagepera. The Finno-Ugric Republics and the Russian State. C. Hurst & Co, UK, 1999.
- Schnirelmann, Victor: “Christians! Go home”: A Revival of Neo-Paganism between the Baltic Sea and Transcaucasia. Journal of Contemporary Religion, Vol. 17, No. 2, 2002.
