= Erzyan Mastor (journal) =

Erzyan language newspaper

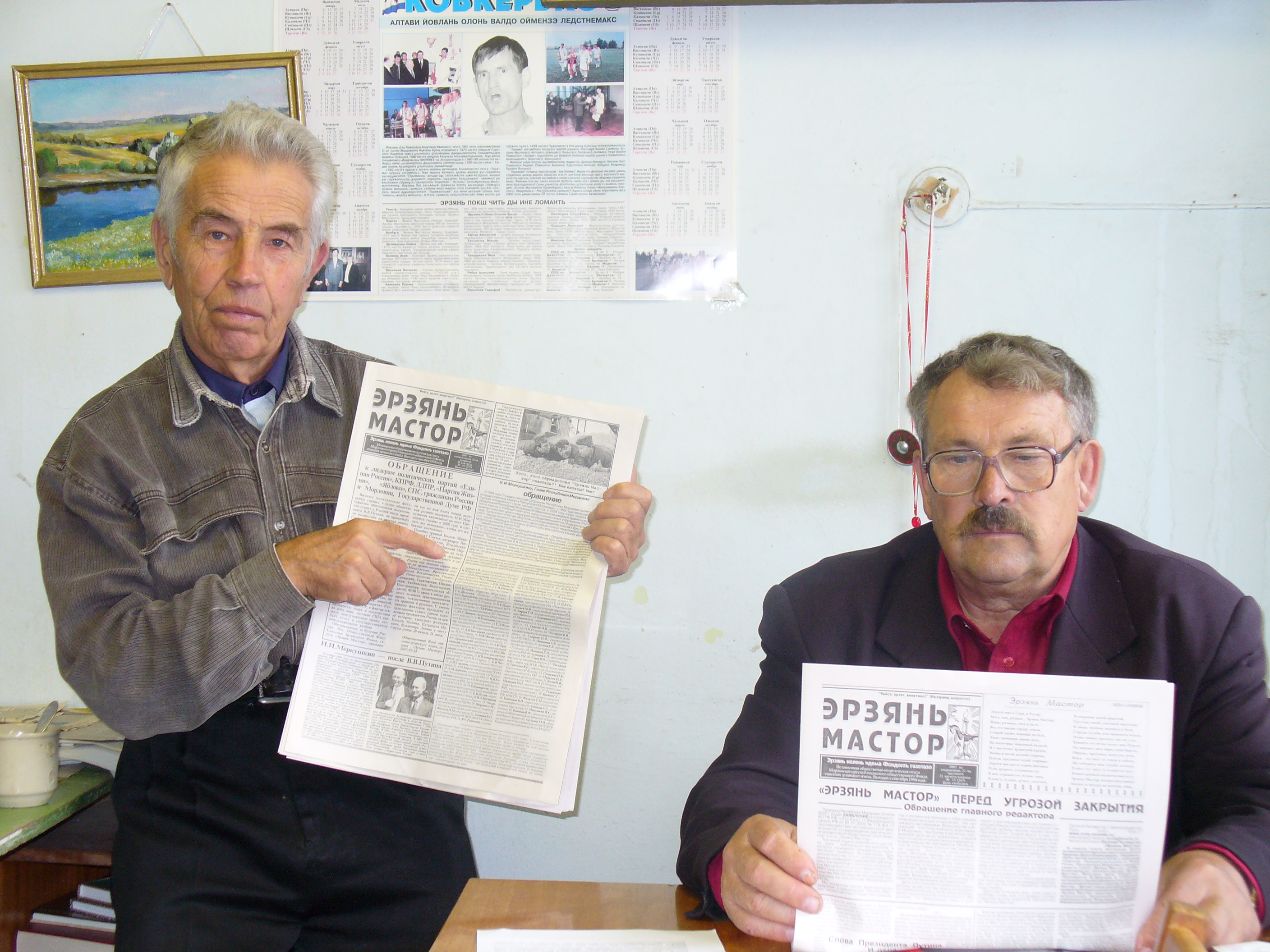
Yevgeny Chetvergov and Grigory Musalyov, editors of Erzyan Mastor

Erzyan Mastor (Erzya: Эрзянь Мастор, 'Erzya land') is an Erzyan- and Russian-language bilingual newspaper published by the Foundation for the Salvation of the Erzya Language in Saransk, capital of Mordovia in the Russian Federation.

== History ==
It was established in the capital of the Republic of Mordovia in Saransk on 20 September 1994. Its first editor was Aleksandr Sharonov. He was replaced by Mariz Kemal, poet, writer, and social activist.

A case against the newspaper had gone on for two years, beginning on 23 July 2007. The newspaper was accused by Prosecutor General of Mordovia of publishing "extremist materials". On 30 June 2009, the state court of the Republic of Mordovia ruled that the publication of Erzyan Mastor may continue.
