= Erzya Language Day =

Commemoration in Erzya culture

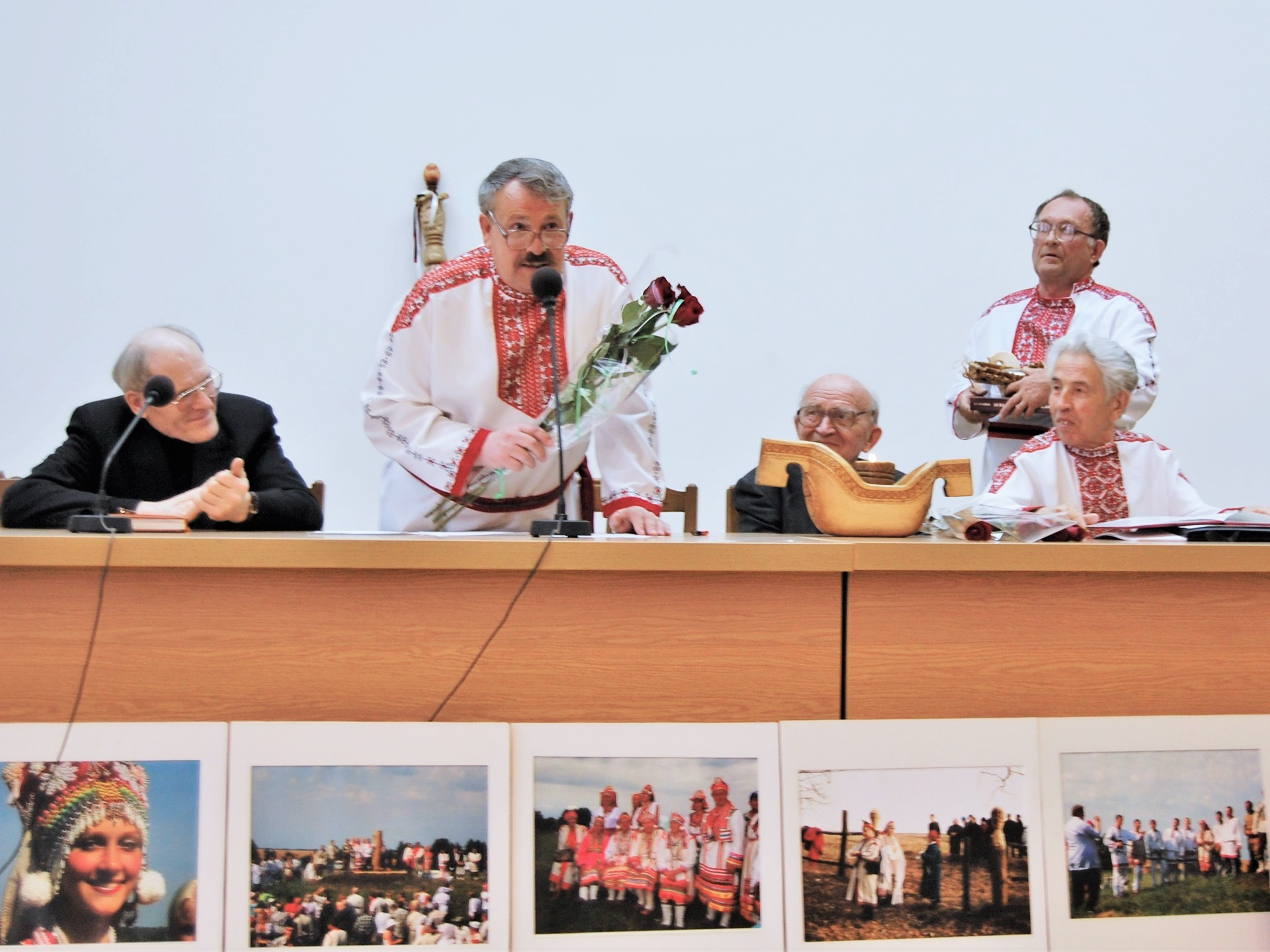
- Observed by: Erzyas
- Significance: Birthday of Anatoli Ryabov
- Date: 16 April
- Next time: 16 April 2026
- Frequency: Annual

Erzya Language Day (Erzya: Erzjan kelen chi, Эрзянь келень чи) is observed on April 16 since 1993 mainly in Mordovia by the Erzya people, but also in other areas in Russia and elsewhere.

In 1993, the Erzya Language Foundation suggested that one day a year should be proposed to celebrate the Erzya language, in an effort to promote its preservation. April 16, the birthday of Anatoli Ryabov, creator of the Erzya language's Latin alphabet, was chosen as the annual celebration day.

Erzya Language Day celebrations often involve artistic performances, exhibitions, meetings, traditional music concerts, tastings of national dishes, fairs, etc.

== See also ==
- Erzyas
- Public holidays in Russia
