= Anzori Barkalaja =

Estonian folklorist (born 1968)

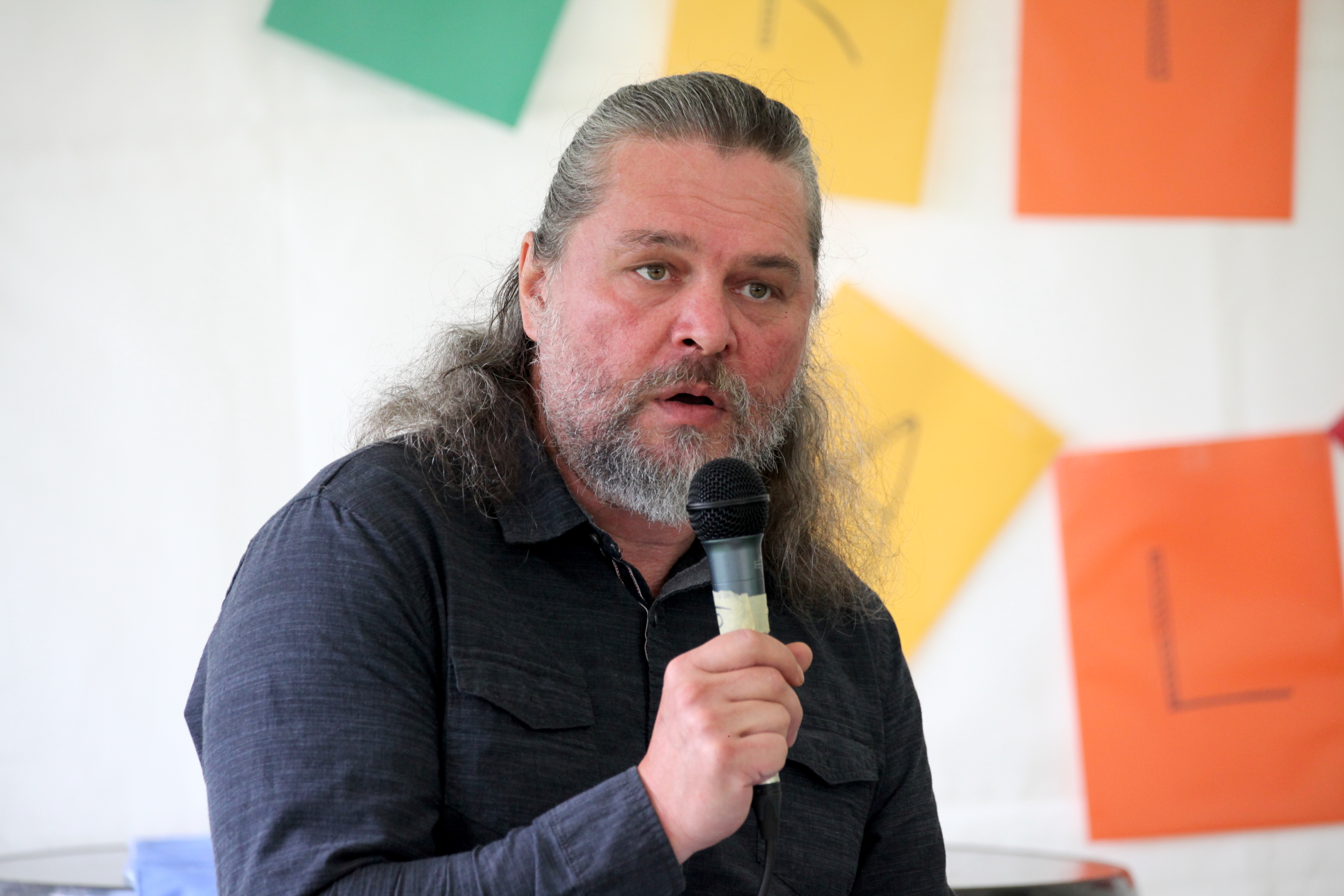
Anzori Barkalaja in 2021

Anzori Barkalaja (born 19 March 1968) is an Estonian folklorist.

== Life and work ==
Anzori Barkalaja was born in Dushanbe, Tajik Soviet Socialist Republic (now, Tajikistan) to a Mingrelian father and an Estonian mother. After his parents divorced, he moved to Estonia with his mother. He graduated from the University of Tartu, where defended his doctoral dissertation in folklore.

In 2000-2015 he was the head of the Viljandi Culture Academy. In 2014, he was awarded with Order of the White Star, IV class. He has been chairman of the Estonian neopagan organisation Maavalla Koda.

In 2018, he was one of the founders of the Estonian Biodiversity Party, but announced his departure from the party on 3 January 2019.
