= Addold Mossin =

Estonian neopaganist (1919–2024)

Addold Adolf Mossin (12 December 1919 – 16 March 2024) was an Estonian neopaganist and political activist. He was one of the founders of Maavalla Koda.

In 2003, he was awarded the Order of the White Star, V class. He turned 100 in December 2019, and died on 16 March 2024, at the age of 104.
