= Udmurt Vos =

Ethnic religious revival of the Udmurts

Udmurt Vos (Udmurt: Удмурт Вӧсь, romanized: Udmurt Vöś, lit. 'Udmurt Faith') is the ethnic religious revival of the Udmurts, a Finno-Ugrian people inhabiting the republic of Udmurtia in Russia. Among the Udmurts, as in other Finno-Ugrian republics in the Volga region, the revival of paganism is inextricably intertwined with the revival of national-ethnic culture and awareness.

The Udmurtian Pagan revival circles sprang out of the Demen (Udmurt for 'Society') movement which was established in December 1989 for the protection and restoration of the Udmurt ethnic culture. Udmurt Vos as an institution was founded in 1994.

According to 2012 statistics, 2% of the population of Udmurtia adheres to forms of Paganism. Victor Schnirelmann reported an adherence of 4% for the Udmurts alone.

== Etymology ==
The Udmurt word vös’ means "prayer", "sacrifice", "religion", "faith" and as a root derives many other words in the Udmurt language, among which vös’as’kon meaning "prayer", "sacrifice", vös’as’ meaning "priest", and the verbs vös’any meaning "to pray", "to sacrifice", "to hallow", vös’as’kyny that means "to pray", "to beg", and vös’atyny meaning "to sacrifice".

== History ==
The first date in the history of Christianisation of the Udmurts is 1557, when Ivan the Terrible conferred privileges on baptised Udmurt families by imperial deed. However, tough attempts to convert all the Udmurts were undertaken only in the middle of the 18th century, when the government began to implement measures to Christianise the population, sending missionaries who built churches and schools. Pagans were repressed, and sacred groves, prayer sites and pagan burial grounds were destroyed.

Various attempts to restore the Udmurt native religion emerged, for example the movement of the "Lime-Tree Worshippers" in 1849. However, in contrast to the Mari, the Udmurt Pagans did not display any tendency to centralise or formalise their religion.

After 1917 began a short period of national reawakening, the Udmurt Republic was created and an active national intelligentsia took shape. This helped a revival of the Udmurt Vos. However, with the 1930s' rise of the Soviet Union the Udmurt intelligentsia was almost entirely destroyed, the high priests were declared enemies of the people and subjected to cruel repression, worship was forbidden, rural holy places, temples and family shrines were destroyed, and sacred groves were uprooted.

By the perestroika period, the Udmurts had very high levels of alcoholism and suicide, and low birth rates. Moreover, Russification proceeded steadily. In the late 1980s and the early 1990s ethno-national and cultural identity reawakened, and despite the significant Christianisation the Udmurt national movement was entirely outside the framework of Eastern Orthodoxy, and even hostile to it.

The Udmurt native religion became the basis of the national movement, and in 1994 a group of Izhevsk intellectuals, artists, writers, scholars and entrepreneurs founded the Udmurt Vos as an institution and mass association. Genuine high priests were sought, and Vasili Maksimov, a simple peasant from an Udmurt village in Tatarstan, became the head of the new church. National worship services were organised (a thing that had never happened before), and since that time these have been held yearly in different regions of the republic.

== Theory ==
According to the theologians of the Udmurt Vos, the whole of nature is determined by the numinous presence of divinity, gods and spirits. Existence has three basic levels: the cosmic, in which the central divinity Inmar takes first place; that of the aerial elements, the heavens, in which Kvaz' is dominant; and the earthly creation, the world of creatures, in which Kelchin' is dominant. Alongside the hierarchy of Inmar, Kvaz' and Kelchin', there is Lud (the world tree), the genius (breeder) of all spirits, which is neither good nor evil. The dead live in another world which is a perfect mirror of our own.

According to another source (Taagepera), traditional Udmurt Vos theory follows patterns similar to the Mari one, but in contrast to the Mari, female deities dominate. In-Mumy (Mother of the Heavens), Shundy-Mumy (Sun Mother) and (Gudyry-Mumy) are the chief deities. Male deities of the aerial sphere are Inmar (god of the sky and air), Töl-Peri (wind) and Kwaz (weather). Earthly and chthonic gods are mostly male; they include Nulesmurt (forest man), Kyldysin (fertility and procreation), Invu (waters), and Vorshud (genius of the kins and genius loci).

According to the movement's leaders, peoples who have renounced their own gods have no future, because their spiritual betrayal has led to deep injury of the people's soul. They point to the Japanese people, who have preserved their popular faith, as a model of better prospects. Only peoples who find in themselves the strength to take the step of returning to their roots have any prospect for the future.

One of the first Slavic Rodnover communities, the Tur, first appeared in Izhevsk in 1994. It is difficult to say whether or not the propaganda of Udmurt Vos played any role in its origin, but the leaders of the Udmurt Vos welcomed its appearance.

== Practices ==
Some villages of followers of Udmurt Vos are organised to have sacrificial groves called lud in Udmurt where often are located the "large temples" (byd’z’ym kuala, "large prayer house"), special buildings for worship dedicated to the spirit breeder-generator of the kin, whose worship comprises both the ideas of genius generis and genius loci. Both of them are connected in the Udmurt notion vorshud (formed by vordyny, meaning "to hold", "to contain" plus shud meaning "happiness", "luck").

The "little temple" (pichi/pokchi kuala) is a kind of worship building located in the yard of each family that maintains the large prayer house. The clergy is made up of priests (vös’as’, vösias), local religious authorities elected amongst the males of the community for organising and performing prayers and sacrifices. They must be married and healthy, both mentally and physically. Some of these priests may become high-priests (tuno). Prayers are called kuriskon.

== Udmurt Vos in Tataria and Bashkiria ==
Northern Tatarstan and Bashkortostan were in ancient times areas of settlement of the Udmurt people. Many Udmurt villages are divided in these two republics. Over the centuries Udmurts there were subjected to enforced Islamisation by the dominating Tatars and Bashkirs, but they preserved strong national consciousness and Pagan faith. In recent times pan-Udmurt worship services have taken place annually in Bashkortostan, and they have been the subject of repression by Muslim authorities.

== Bibliography ==
- Schnirelmann, Victor: “Christians! Go home”: A Revival of Neo-Paganism between the Baltic Sea and Transcaucasia. Journal of Contemporary Religion, Vol. 17, No. 2, 2002.
- Aado Lintrop. The Spring Prayer Feasts in the Udmurt Village of Varklet-Bodya in Tatarstan. Cosmos 18 (2002). pp. 43–55
- Rein Taagepera. The Finno-Ugric Republics and the Russian State. C. Hurst & Co, UK, 1999.
- Filatov, Sergei; Shchipkov Alexander. Udmurtia: Orthodoxy, Paganism, Authority. Religion, State & Society, Vol. 25, No. 2, 1997
