= Kalle Eller =

Estonian publicist and poet (1940–2023)

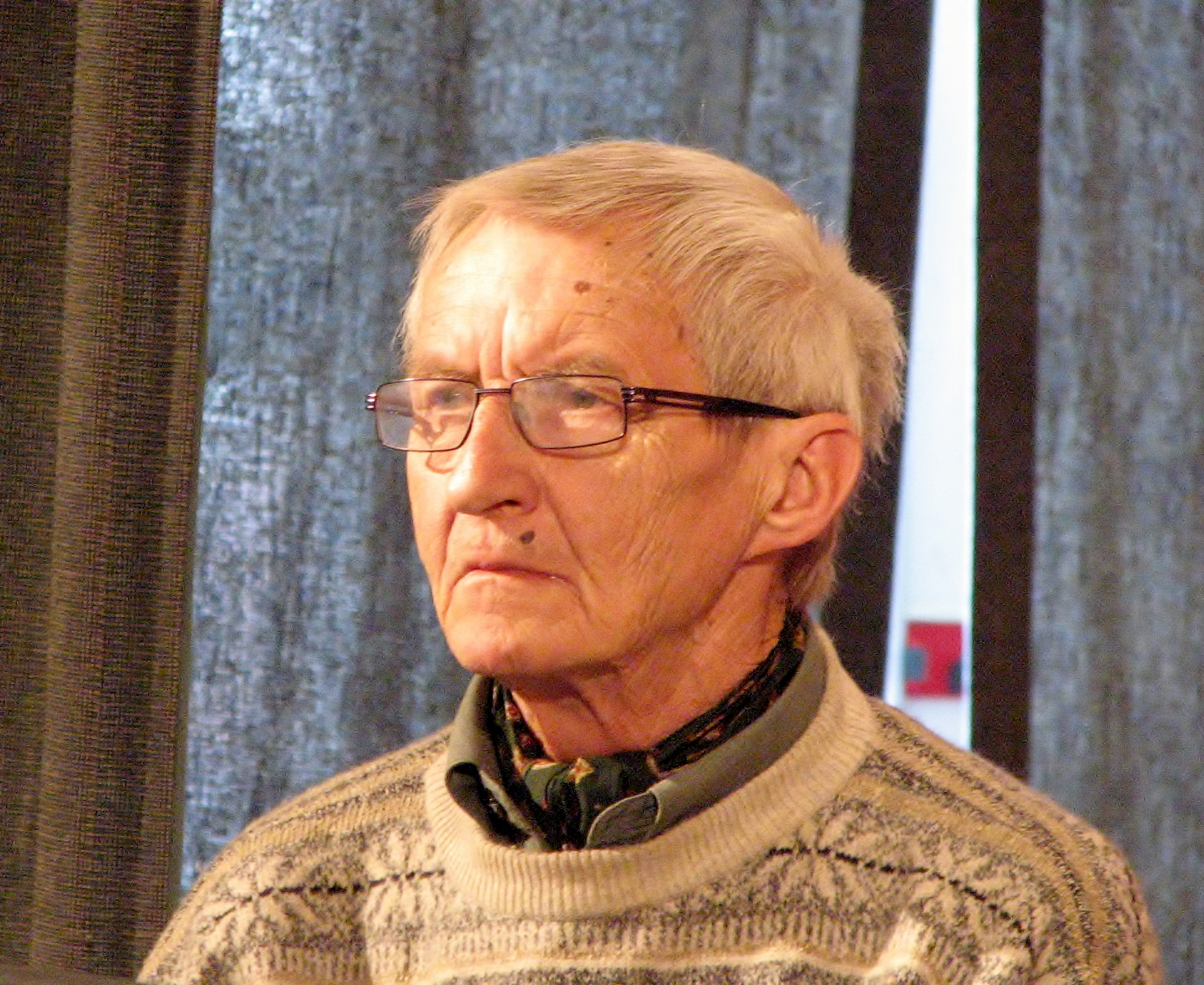
- Born: 7 May 1940; Tartu, Estonia
- Died: 10 January 2023 (aged 82)
- Education: Tartu State University
- Occupations: publisher; researcher; educator; poet
- Writing career
- Pen name: Kalle Istvan Eller

Kalle Eller (pseudonym Kalle Istvan Eller; 7 May 1940 – 10 January 2023) was an Estonian publisher, neopagan, cultural researcher, educator, and poet.

== Early life ==
Kalle Eller was born in Tartu. From 1964 until 1970, he studied Estonian and English philology at Tartu State University.

From 1970 to 1973, he worked as a schoolteacher in Ahja, Kodasoo, and Sihva. From 1986 until 1988, he was a lecturer at the Institute of Theology of the Estonian Evangelical Lutheran Church. From 1989 until 1991, he was an Officer of the Defence League; from 17 February 17 until 10 November 10, 1990, he was the Commander of the Defence League. Between 1992 and 1994, he was the Adviser to the National Defence Committee of the Riigikogu. In July 2006, Heinrich Mark awarded him the rank of colonel in the Estonian Defence League. Eller is also one of the founders of Maavalla Koda.

== Publications ==
- 1968-1972: works in several almanacs: "Marm" (1968), "Õitsev Tuul" (1969), "Kamikadze" (1970), "Jumala Tuul" (1972)
- 1972: essay "Maarahvast"
- 1987: 200 maakeelset nime. Kultuur ja Elu 1987, nr 9, pp 21–22
- 1990: 500 maakeelset nime. Noortekalender 1990, pp 140–145
- 1999: Võro-seto language. (in English) Võru Instituut 1999. ISBN 9985-9149-5-3
- 2001: Bärsärk. Luuletusi Eesti Vabariigi aastaist 1967– . Ilmamaa 2001 ISBN 9985-878-78-7
