= Shtatol =

Wax candle supported by an ornamented wooden vessel used in traditional Erzya rituals

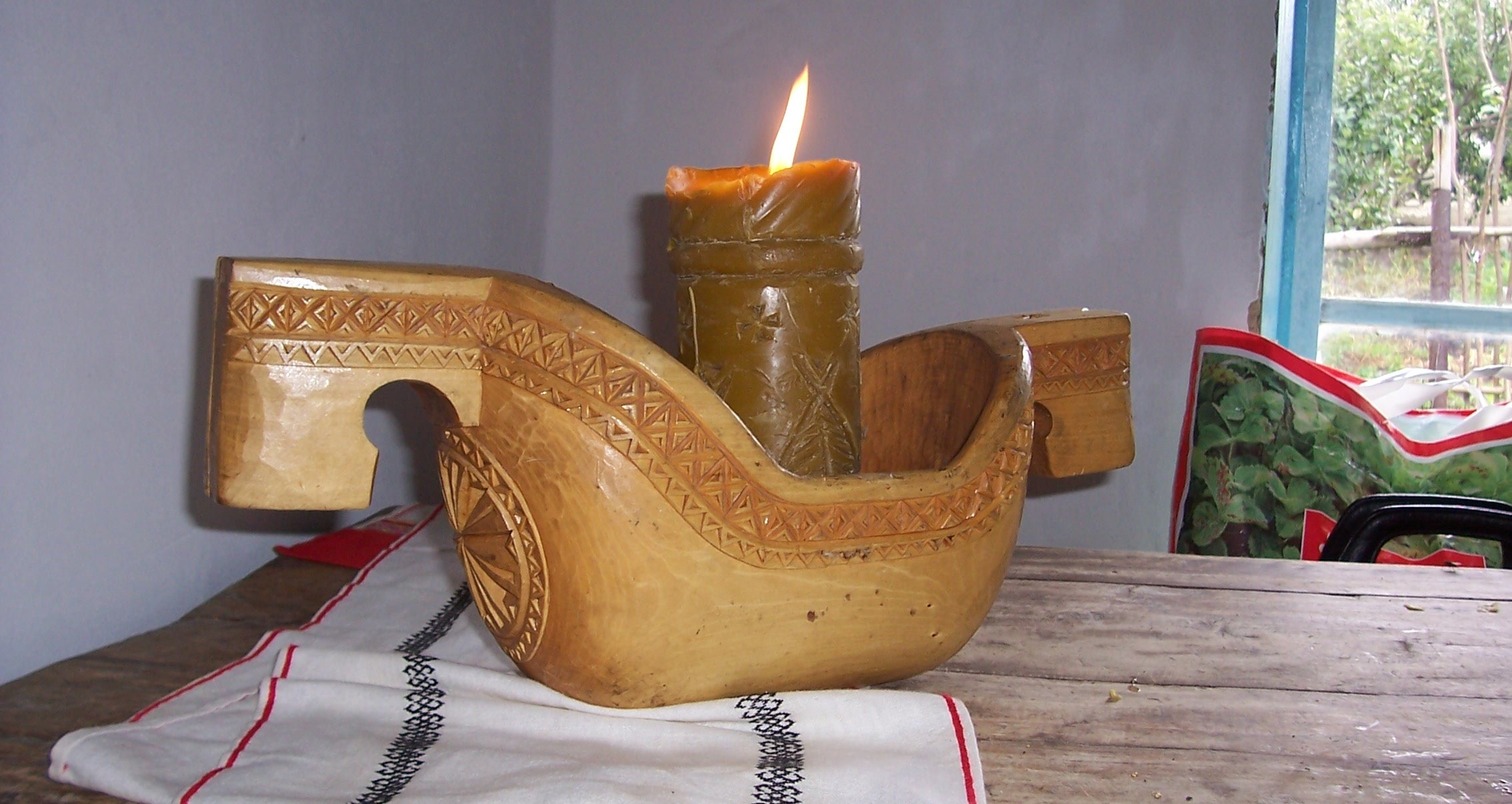
Shtatol in a museum in Mordovia

A shtatol, also called an Erzyan shtatol (Erzya: štatol, ěrzäń štatol), is a wax candle supported by an ornamented wooden vessel, used in traditional Erzya rituals (erzja Ineškipazněń Kemema).

== Etymology ==
The oldest known use of the term shtatol (from Erzya: šta, 'wax', and tol, 'fire') in a non-Erzya source is in the Russian-language Explanatory Dictionary of the Living Great Russian Language published by Russian lexicographer Vladimir Dal in 1863.

== Use and symbolism ==
Shtatols symbolize life, ancestor reverence, and the passage of time. The wooden vessel in which the candle is placed is called a jandava (Erzya: jandava). Jandavas are carved from solid linden trunks and are vaguely duck-shaped. Shtatols and jandavas are commonly used during Ras'ken' Ozks, Verya Ozks and other Erzya rituals.
