= Yakov Grigoshin =

Erzya poet

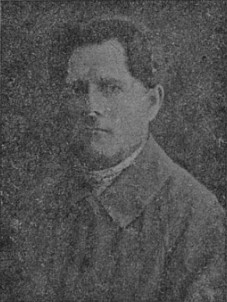
Yakov Grigoshin

Yakov Pahomovich Grigoshin (1888–1939) was an Erzya poet. He is considered to be the founder of Erzya literature. He wrote his first poems in Russian while studying to become a teacher, but later he used his native language Erzya. He authored some of the first Erzya-language textbooks and published several collections of poems and stories. Grigoshin was shot to death in the Great Purge.
