= Council of Priests of Abkhazia =

Seven principal priests of the Abkhazian traditional religion

- Formation: 2012
- Type: Non-profit, Abkhaz neopaganism
- Location: Sukhumi, Akhbazia
- Official language: Abkhaz
- Chairman (Priest of Dydrypsh): Zaur Chichba (2012-)

The Council of Priests of Abkhazia unites the seven principal priests of the Abkhazian traditional religion, who are responsible for the Seven Shrines of Abkhazia. The council was formally constituted on 3 August 2012. Its chairman is Zaur Chichba, the priest of Dydrypsh, and its executive secretary Khajarat Khvartskhia.
