= Supilinn =

Neighbourhood of Tartu, Estonia

Coordinates: 58°23′12.52″N 26°42′46.1″E

- Neighbourhood of Tartu
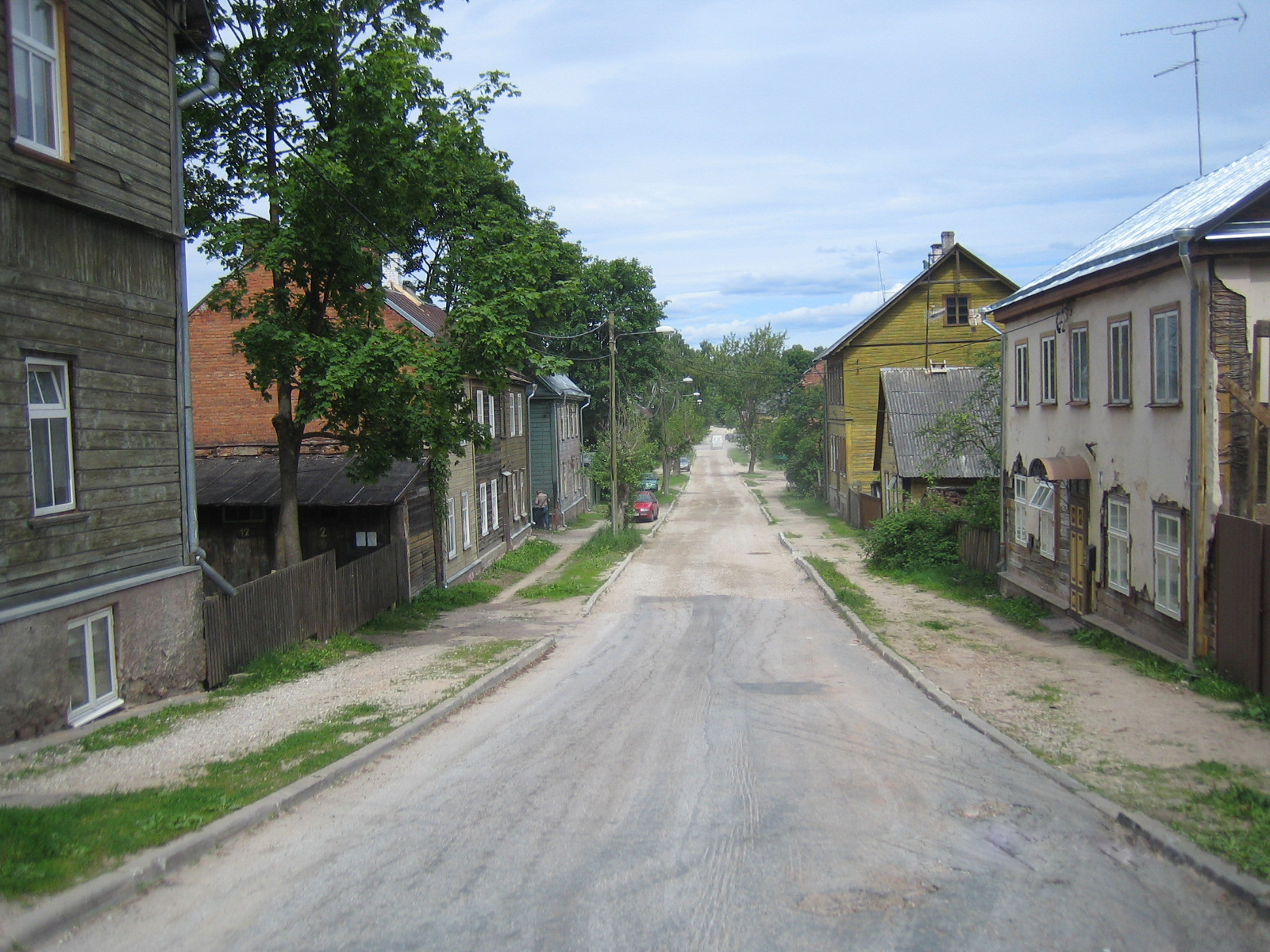
- Marja street in Supilinn.

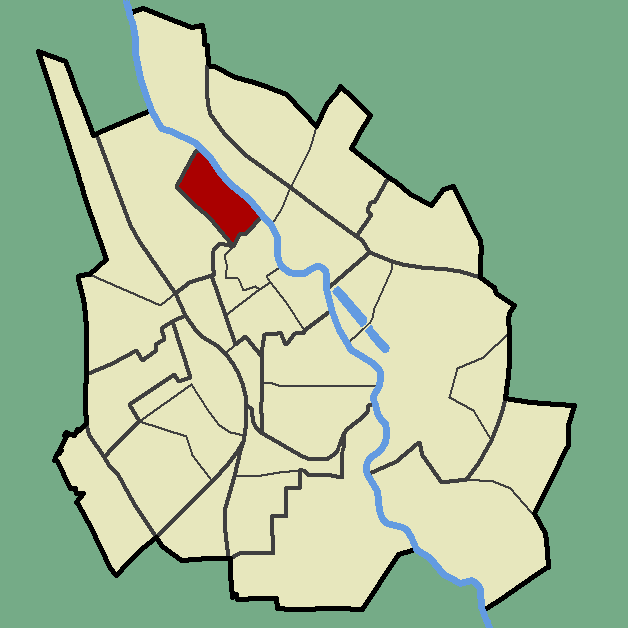
- Location of Supilinn in Tartu.
- Country: Estonia
- County: Tartu County
- City: Tartu

Area
  - Total: 0.48 km^{2} (0.19 sq mi)

Population (31.12.2013)
  - Total: 1,863
  - Density: 3,900/km^{2} (10,000/sq mi)
- Website: www.supilinn.ee

Drone video of Supilinn in Tartu, Estonia 2021

Supilinn (Estonian for "Soup Town") is a neighbourhood of Tartu, Estonia. It is located just north of the city centre, on the right bank of Emajõgi River. Supilinn has a population of 1,863 (as of 31 December 2013). With an area of 0.48 km^{2} (0.19 mi^{2}) it is the smallest neighbourhood of Tartu. Supilinn is especially famous for being a former slum, mostly consisting of 1–2 floored wooden apartment buildings.

== Gallery ==
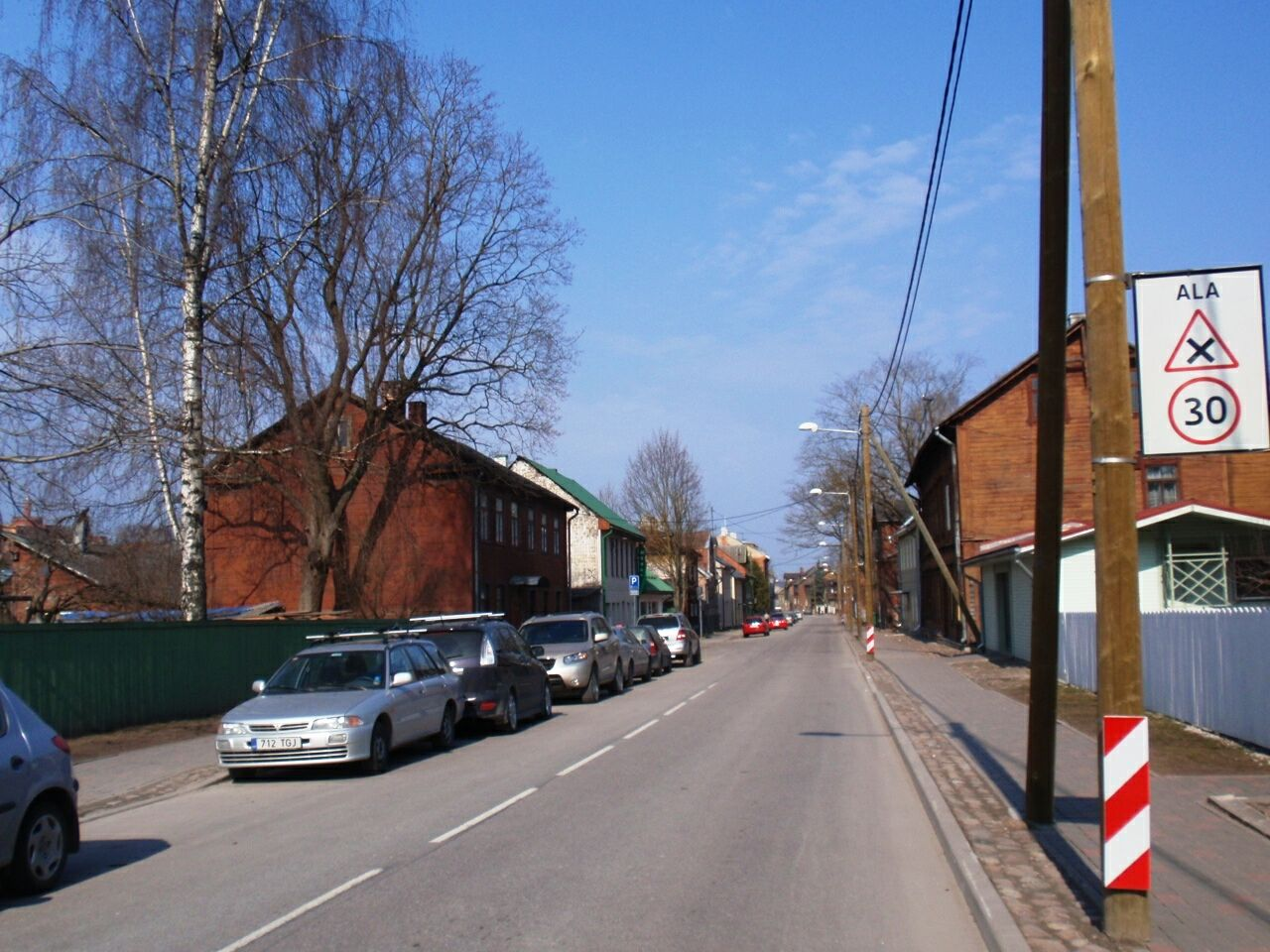
Entrance to Supilinn from the city centre, Herne (Pea) street.

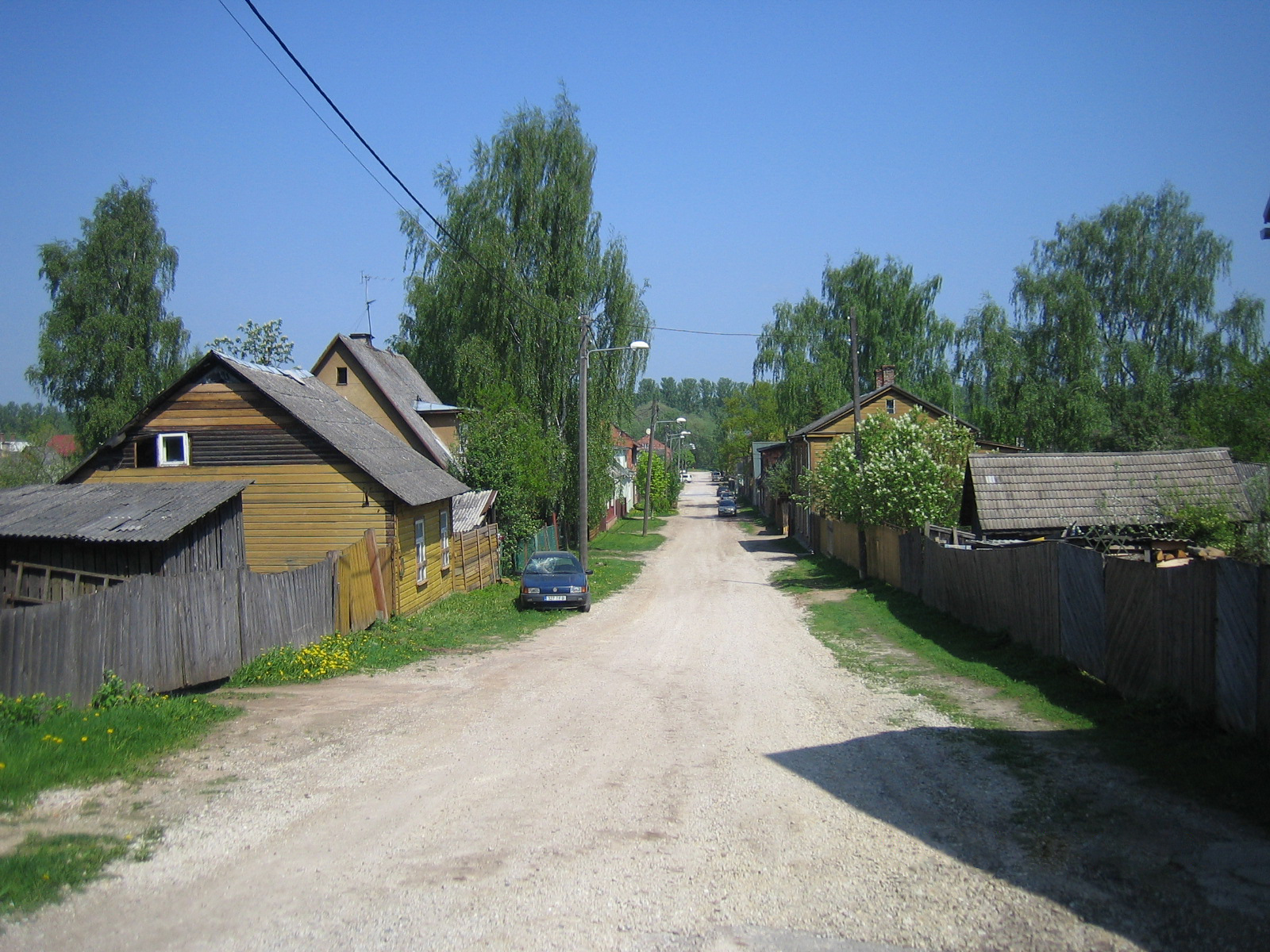
Meloni (Melon) street

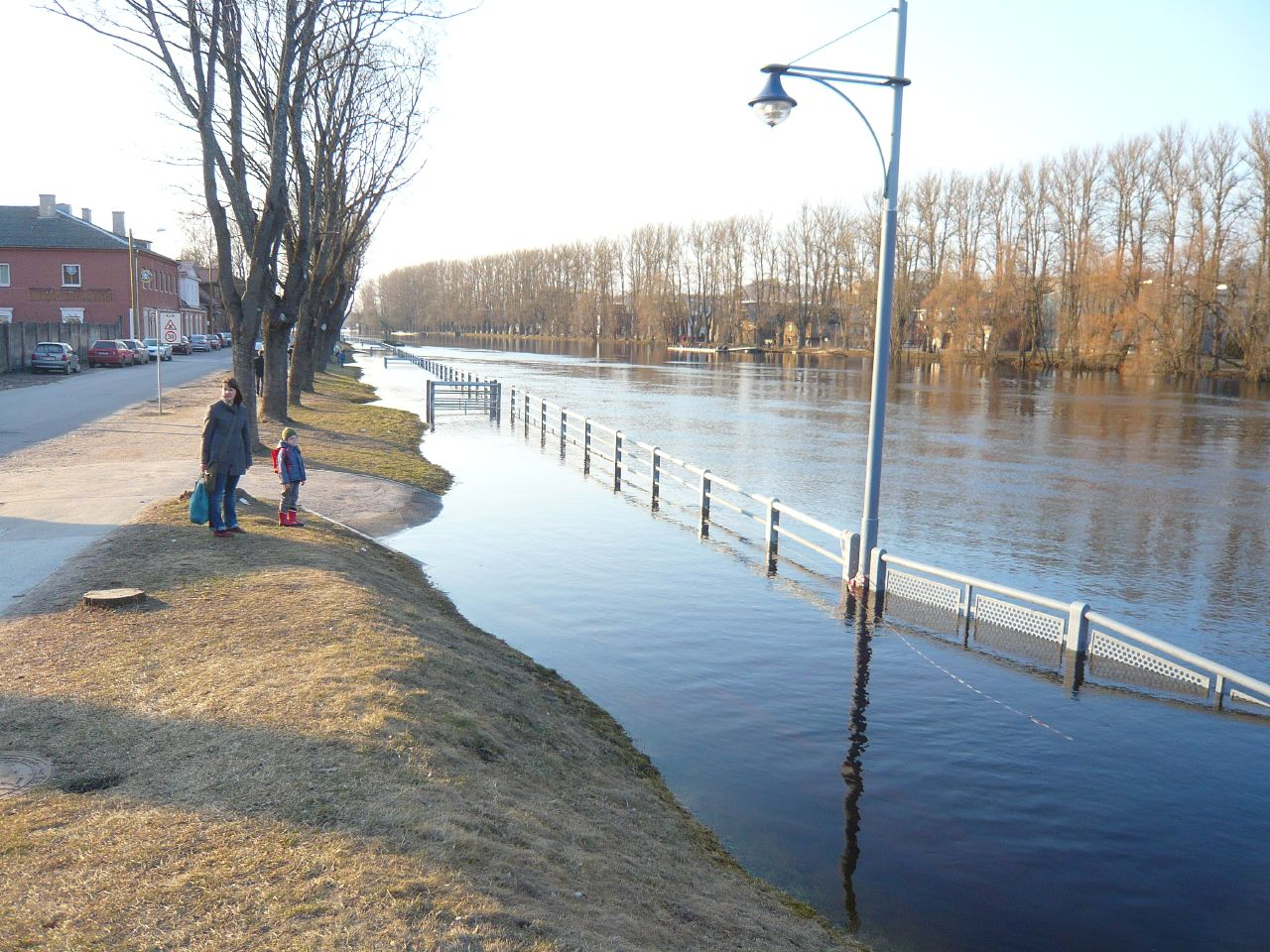
Flood of Emajõgi beside Supilinn

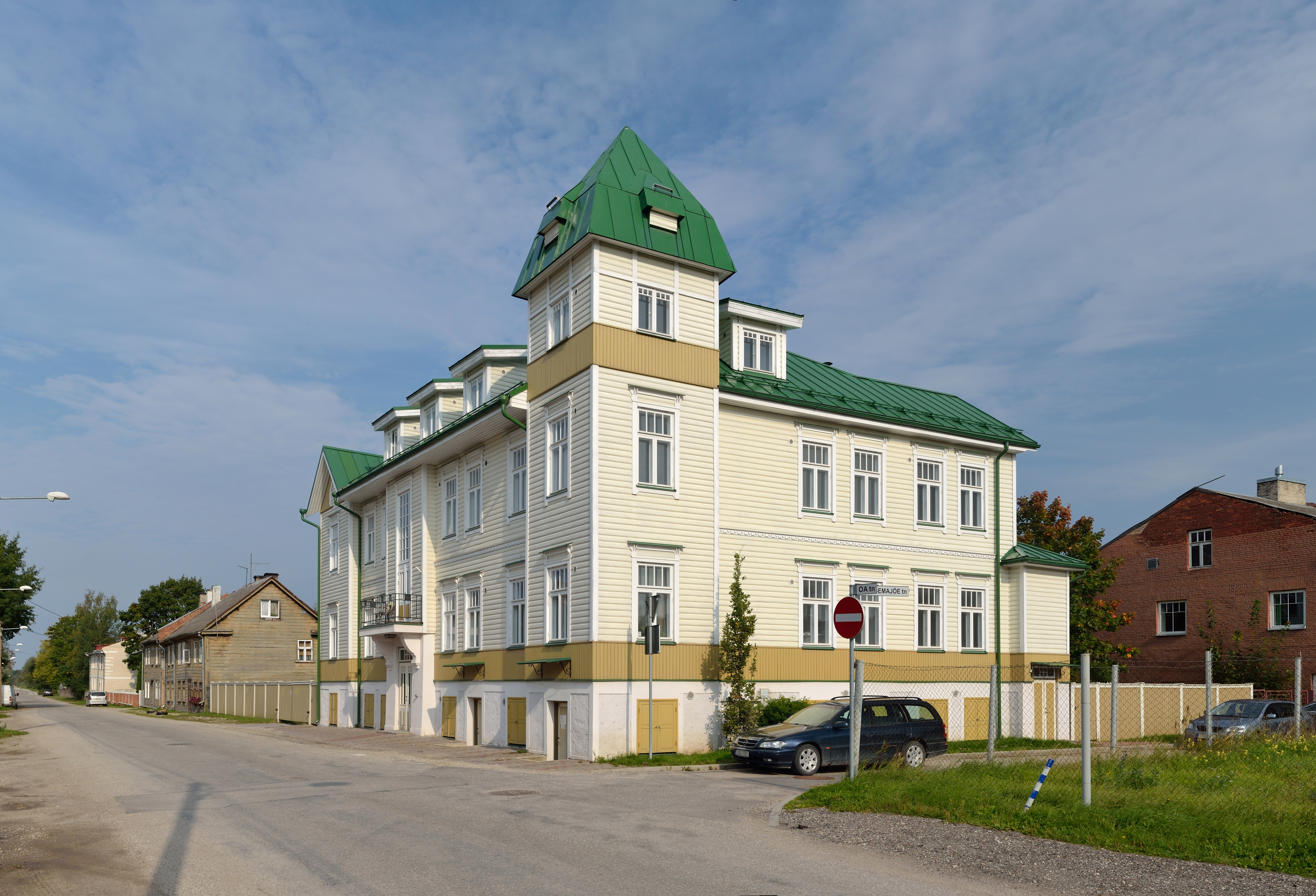
Oa (Bean) street

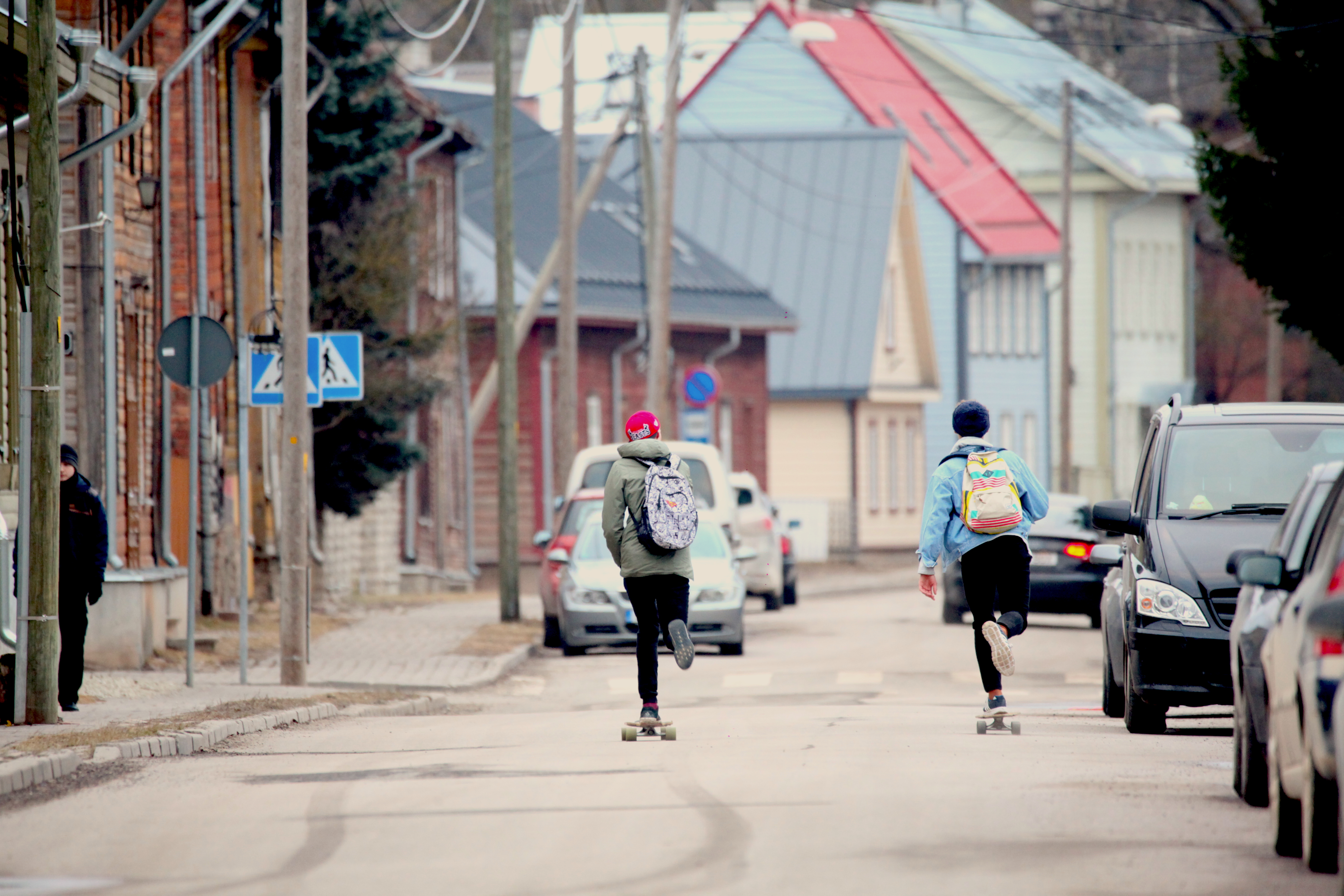
Skaters on the street Herne

== See also ==
- Tartu Song Festival Grounds
- A. Le Coq
