= Tharapita =

God in Estonian mythology

Tharapita (variations of the name include Taara, Tooru, and Tarapitha), also known as Jumal, is a prominent god in Estonian mythology, with a strong resemblance to the Finnish Ukko and the Germanic Thor.

== Etymology ==
The Livonian toponym Thoreyda (also Thoreida and German Treiden) attested in the Chronicle of Livonia is interpreted as the 'garden of Taara – Thor' from Taara + *aida 'garden'. If this interpretation is correct, the theonym Taara was also known in Livonian.

The name Tharapita has been interpreted as 'Taara, help!' (Estonian: Taara, a(v)ita!) and 'Taara's thunderbolt' (Estonian: Taara pikne).

== History ==
The Chronicle of Henry of Livonia mentions Tharapita as the superior god of the Oeselians (inhabitants of Saaremaa), also well known to Vironian tribes in northern Estonia. According to the chronicle, when the crusaders invaded Vironia in 1220, there was a beautiful wooded hill in Vironia, where locals believe Tharapita was born and from which he flew to Saaremaa. The hill is believed to be the Ebavere Hill (Ebavere mägi) in modern Lääne-Viru County.

Tharapita also inspired an Estonian neopagan movement, known as taaralased or taarausulised. In the middle of the 19th century, Taara became popular in the national movement, as an anti-German and anti-Lutheran symbol, and creators of Estonian pseudomythology made Taara the supreme god of the Estonian pantheon. From that period, Estonia's second-biggest city Tartu was poetically called Taaralinn ("city of Taara").

Taara was known by the Tavastian tribe of Finland. At an old cult location now known as Laurin Lähde (Lauri's Fountain) in the county of Janakkala, Tavastians worshipped Taara there as late as the 18th century, eventually being shut down by church authorities.

Tharapita may have been known among the Slavs of the island of Rügen, where Danish crusaders destroyed a pagan idol named Turupit in 1168.

The story of Taara's flight from Vironia to Saaremaa has been associated with a major meteor impact that formed the Kaali crater in Saaremaa. One proponent of theories about the meteor and its consequences was historian Lennart Meri, the president of Estonia from 1992 to 2001, who wrote several books about the subject.

Variations similar to the name "Thor" are known to many peoples who speak Uralic languages. The Khants have a god named Torum, the Samis have Turms, and the Samoyeds have Tere. Finnish bishop Mikael Agricola mentions in 1551 a war god called Turisas, although this is more likely to refer to Thurisas; the Finns had also a god of harvest, luck and success called Tuuri.

According to several medieval chronicles, Estonians did not work on Thursdays (days of Thor) and Thursday nights were called "evenings of Tooru". Some sources say Estonians used to gather in holy woods (Hiis) on Thursday evenings, where a bagpipe player sat on a stone and played while people danced and sang until the dawn.

== Mentions of Tharapita in Henry's Chronicle of Livonia ==
Tharapita is mentioned five times in the Chronicle of Livonia by the missionary priest Henry. The first mention is in connection with mission in Vironia in northern Estonia, the rest pertain to the conquest and baptism of the islands of Muhu and Saaremaa (Osilia) off the western coast of mainland Estonia.

=== Felling the statues of gods in Vironia ===
Along with the first mention, Henry presents the story of Tharapita flying from a forest on top of a hill in Vironia to the island of Saaremaa. According to the chronicle, missionaries felled the images and statues of gods from the hill. The locals are said to have wondered at the fact that the statues did not bleed, which increased their belief in the priests' sermons.

Quo audito sacerdotes modicum subridentes et excusso pulvere pedum in eos ad alias villas festinantes in confinio Vironie tres villas baptizaverunt, ubi erat mons et silva pulcherrima, in qua dicebant indigene magnum deum Osiliensium natum, qui Tharapita vocatur, et de illo loco in Osiliam volasse. Et ibat alter sacerdos succidens imagines et similitudines deorum ibi factas, et mirabantur illi, quod sanguis non efflueret, et magis sacerdotum sermonibus credebant.

=== The siege of the Muhu hill fort ===
According to the chronicle, Estonians besieged in the Muhu hill fort exclaimed to Tharapita in joy and cried to the sacred grove (nemus) for assistance, as the Christians laying siege prayed to God and exclaimed to Jesus for help.

Gaudet exercitus christianorum, exclamant, Deum exorant. Clamant et illi, gaudentes in Tarapitha suo. Illi nemus, isti Iesum invocant, in cuius nomine ac laude fortifer ascendunt, ad summitatem valli perveniunt, fortissime et ab illis repelluntur.

=== Baptism of the sons of nobles in Valjala ===
As the sons of nobles are baptised in the defeated hill fort of Valjala (Waldia), Tharapita is banished from the fort:

Dantur pueri nobilium, quorum primum venerabilis Rigensis episcopus cum gaudio et devotione magna catechizatum sacro baptismatis fonte rigavit; alii presbyteri alios rigaverunt, qui et in urbem cum gaudio ducuntur, ut Christum predicent, ut Tharaphitam, qui deus fuit Osilianorum, eiciant, qui per medium castrum fontem consecrantes et dolium replentes primo seniores et meliores cathechizatos, deinde viros alios et mulieres baptizant et pueros.

=== Baptism of Saaremaa after victory ===
Priests spread out over Saaremaa to preach Christ and banish Tharapita.

His mysteriis in urbe Waldia celebratis venerunt nuncii, missi de cunctis urbibus et kiligundis Osilie, querentes pacem et baptismi petentes sacramentum. Gaudet exercitus obsidibusque receptis pax datur et Fraternitus amor. Dicitur, et Suecos captivos restituant liberos. Obediunt, restituere promittunt, presbyteros secum ad castra sua ducunt, qui Christum predicent, qui Tharapitha cum ceteris paganorum diis eiciant, qui populum sacro baptismate tingant. Baptizant itaque sacerdotes in omnibus castris Osilie populum universum utriusque sexus cum leticia magna et pre gaudio lacrimantes, eo quod Domino tot milia genuerunt per lavacrum regenerationis prolem spiritualem, Deo dilectam sponsam novam ex gentibus.

=== Conclusion of the chronicle ===
In the concluding passage of the chronicle, Henry expresses his joy over the fact that Virgin Mary has helped the missionaries from Riga to banish Tharapita and drown the Pharaoh (i.e., the Devil).

Gloria Dei et domini nostri Iesu Christi et beate Marie Virginis servis suis Rigensibus in Osilia talia humiliter, obsides et tributa recipere, captivos omnes christiani nominis restituere, cum victoria redire! Quod reges hactenus non potuerunt, hec beata virgo per servos suos Rigenses breviter et leniter ad honorem sui nominis adimplevit. Quo completo, quo facto, populo videlicet cuncto baptizato, Tharaphita eiecto, Pharaone submerso, captivis liberatis, redite cum gaudio Rigenses.
