= Erzyan native religion =

Modern revival of the ethnic religion of the Erzya

Mordvin Native Faith symbol, also used as logo of the Erzyan Mastor.

The Erzyan native religion (Erzya: эрзянь пазнэнь озноматe, romanized: erzań pazneń oznomate), also called Erzyan polytheism, is the modern revival of the ethnic religion of the Erzya Mordvins, peoples of Volga Finnic ethnic stock dwelling in the republic of Mordovia within Russia, or in bordering lands of Russia. The name of the originating god according to the Erzya tradition is Nishke (Nishke-Paz "god Nishke", Ineshkepaz).

Most Mordvins historically practiced their indigenous religion and preserved their customs and folklore and a few villages completely preserved the native faith at least until the Mordvins were forcefully converted to Christianity by the Russian Orthodox Church in the 17th century and in the early 20th century. The Neopagan revival was started in 1990, alongside that of many other native religions in Russia, as the Soviet Union was on the brink of dissolution.

According to scholar Victor Schnirelmann, 2% of the Erzya adhere to the native faith and do not practice Christianity. Adherents of the Erzyan Mastor organisation organise the Ras'ken' Ozks (lit. 'Native Prayer'), a national Erzyan worship service held yearly, with participation also of members of the Mastorava organisation and other ones.

== History ==
The revival of the Erzyan native religion has grown alongside, and with the support, of Mordvin nationalism which started in the last years of the Soviet regime. The revival of the national consciousness of the Mordvins was difficult at first, since they were a minority in their country and the press, which was very influential, took a tough communist line. The Russian democrats and communists were hostile towards Mordvin nationalists.

At the start of the perestroika the Mordvin national intelligentsia waged a vigorous and successful campaign against Russian Orthodoxy, called "the religion of occupation", "the Russifying ideological force". Later the Saransk Ministry of Culture endorsed the revival of Mordvin culture and Paganism, arousing outcry from local Orthodox bishops. This was the circle that produced the first Neopagans, the Mastorava organisation led by the local poet Raisa Kemaikina, a group within the Saransk intelligentsia whose aim was the complete reconstruction of a Pagan worldview and religious services reworking folkloric, ethnographic and linguistic study.

=== Mastorava - Erzyan Society for National Rebirth ===
The Mastorava organisation was established in 1990 with the aim of "restoring the Erzyaethnic communities", also fostering a revival of Paganism. The association is officially registered in Moscow since 2002. The current president is Nikolay Vasilyevich Butilov.

=== Erzyan Mastor ===
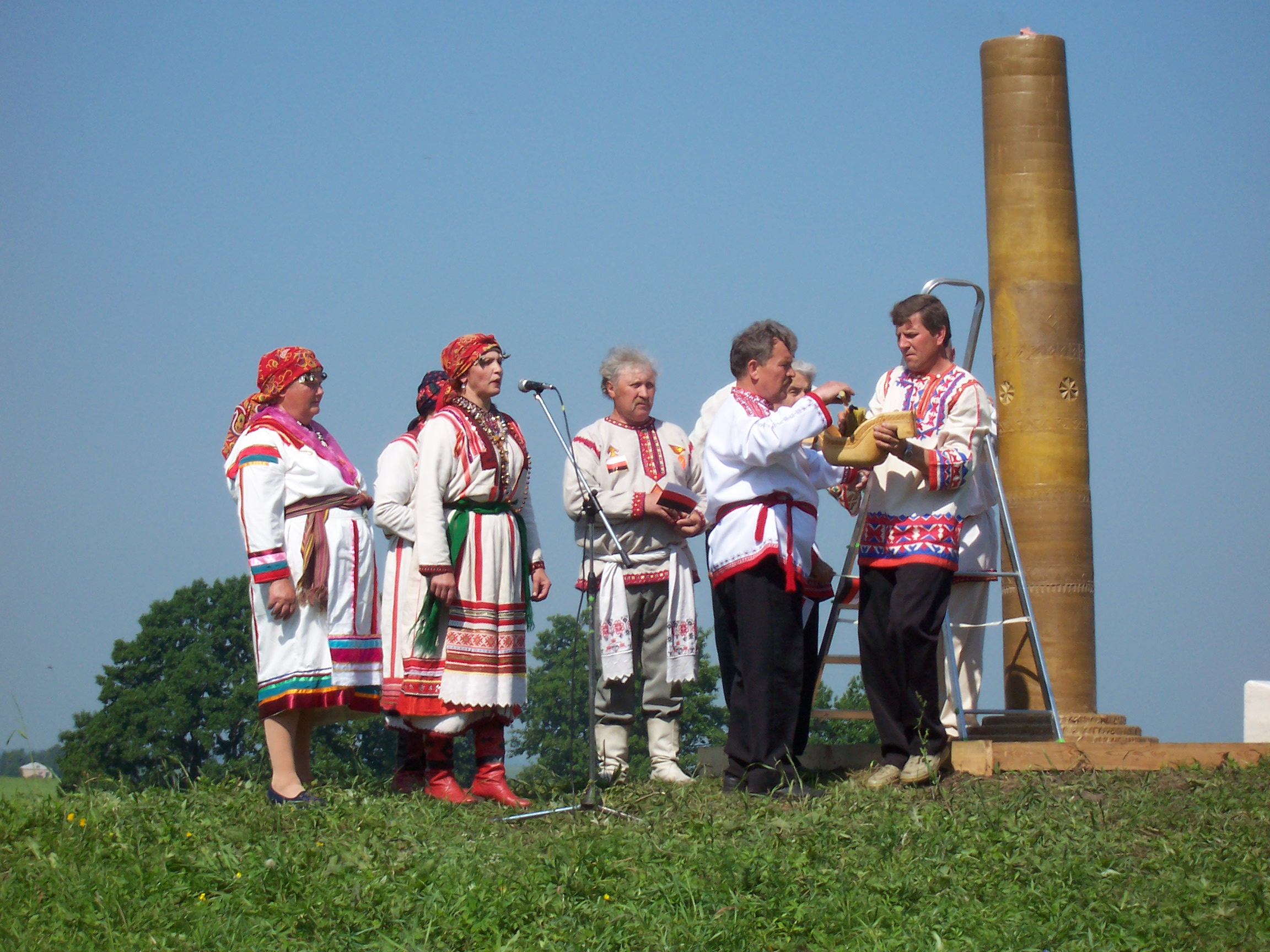
Ritual preparations for the Rasken Ozks.

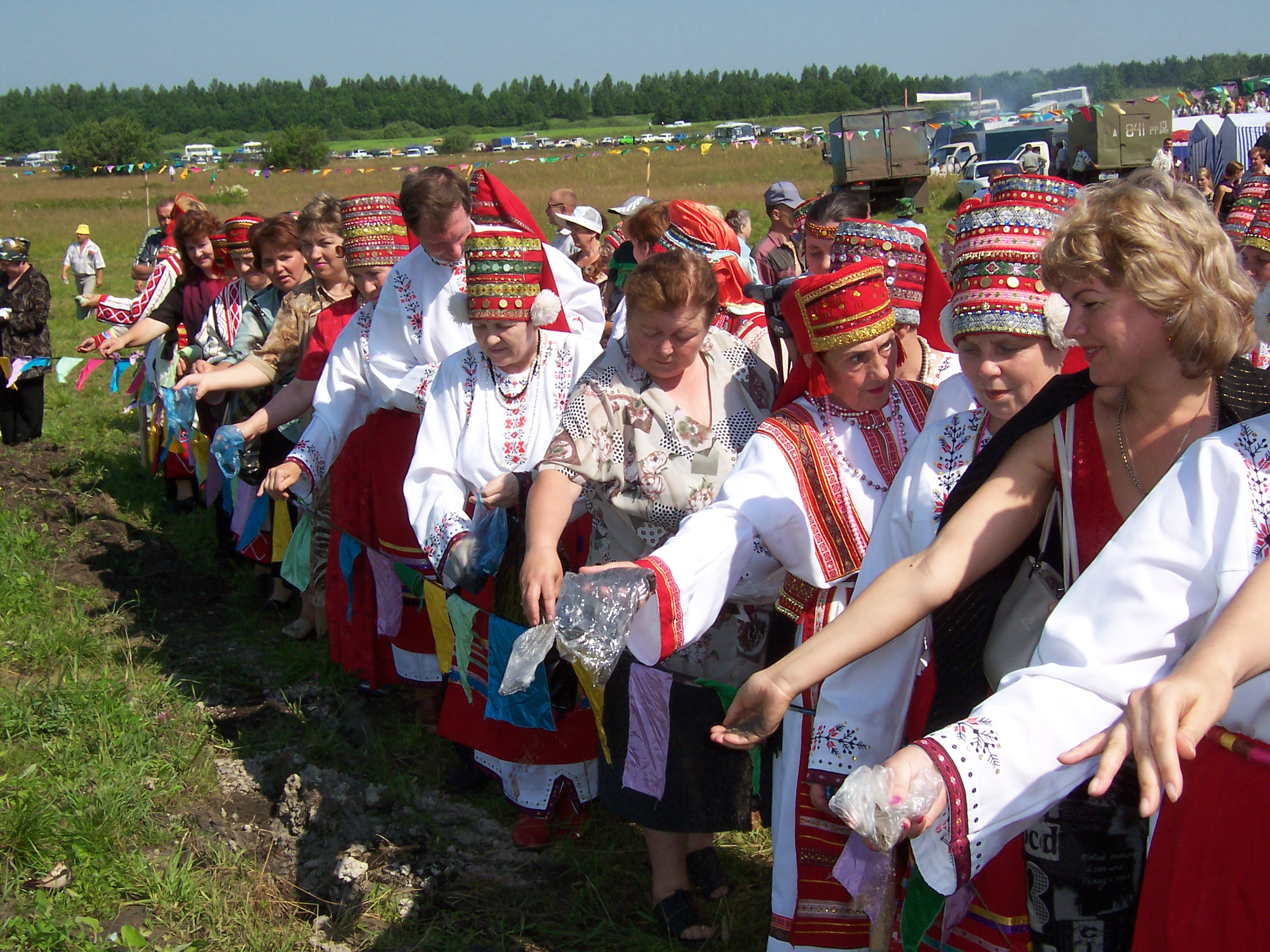
Erzya women taking part in Rasken Ozks celebrations.

The Erzyan Mastor (Erzya for: "Erzyan Land") is a more recent organisation splintering from the Mastorava association. At first it was headed by Raisa Kemaykina (Mariz Kemal; Маризь Кемаль). The group is focused on the Erzya, has political aims for the spread of Erzya Paganism, and is militant against Christianity. In 1992 Kemaykina released the following declarations to the Chuvash newspaper Atlas, answering to a question about her attitude towards Christianity:

I am strongly opposed to it. In its role as the official state religion of Russia, Christianity suffocated the religions of other nations, transforming them into involuntary spiritual slaves. [...] t is worse than a prison. Sooner or later people get out of prison and become masters of their own fate again. A prisoner is someone who has lost his or her freedom temporarily. But a slave is not a prisoner — he doesn't even desire freedom. Over the course of many centuries Christianity has bred our peoples into slaves, depriving them of freedom of thought and reducing them to the level of submissive cattle. In the Erzya religion the relationship between God and human beings is different from that in Christianity. It is deeper, more humane, more beautiful. [...] In our religion a person's worth is not killed or suppressed, but extolled. You never hear things like "you are God's slave", or "turn the other cheek", or "if someone takes your coat give them your shirt as well", or "bless your enemy".

In 1992 Kemaykina organised the first Pagan national ritual after decades or even centuries, sponsored by Erzyan businessmen. Neighbouring villages learned long-forgotten Pagan prayers and Kemaikina was proclaimed the first priestess of the Erzya people. Television reports of that and following national worship ceremonies caused enthusiasm throughout the republic, and now the "Pagan question" is discussed from the remotest villages to university auditoria.

== See also ==
- Erzyan Mastor journal
- Mokshen koy, native religion of Moksha Mordvins

== Bibliography ==
- Schnirelmann, Victor: “Christians! Go home”: A Revival of Neo-Paganism between the Baltic Sea and Transcaucasia. Journal of Contemporary Religion, Vol. 17, No. 2, 2002.
- Filatov, Sergei; Shchipkov, Aleksandr. Religious Developments among the Volga Nations as a Model for the Russian Federation. Religion, State & Society, Vol. 23, No. 3, 1995. pp. 234–237
