= Mariz Kemal =

Erzya writer and poet (born 1950)

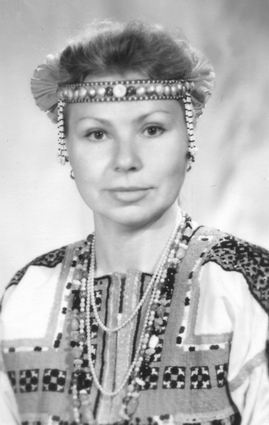
- Born: Raisa Stepanovna Kemaykina ( Раиса Степановна Кемайкина); 1950 (age 75–76); Union of Soviet Socialist Republics

Mariz Kemal (Erzya: Маризь Кемаль; born 1950) is an Erzya language poet, leader of the Erzya native religion celebration Ras'ken' Ozks, and activist.

Kemal is a member of the Union of Writers of Russia and was a co-founder of the Uralic Communion.

== Work ==
In the August 1980 issue of "Syatko" the poem "Eykakschin lavs" ("Cradle of Childhood") was published.

In 1987, a common collection of four authors, Manya Vasolkst, was published, which also included a large selection of her poems. In 1988, the Mordovian book publishing house released her first collection, "Lavs" ("Cradle"), the main leitmotif of which was childhood and adolescence.

The second collection, "Shtatol" ("Candle", 1994), is a philosophical reflection about life, the fate of the Erzya people and her national identity. This included poems including "Mon - Erzyan!" ("I am Erzya!").

The result of a long-term study of Erzya folklore was a collection of essays, "Son Ulnest Erzyat" ("They were Erzya"), and a book of fairy tales, "Evkson Kuzho" ("Fairytale Meadow"), about famous representatives of the Erzya people.

In 1998, her poems were published in the collection "Nile Avat - Nile Morot" ("Four Women - Four Songs", published in Tallinn).

One of the many works of the poet is a small poem "Stepan Erzya Marto Kortnema" ("Conversation with Stepan Erzya", 1998), dedicated to the famous sculptor Stepan Erzya (Nefyodov), which deals with the problem of the loss of cultural heritage and the fate of the Erzya nation.
