= Erzyas =

Finno-Ugric ethnic group

Erzya
эрзят eŕźat

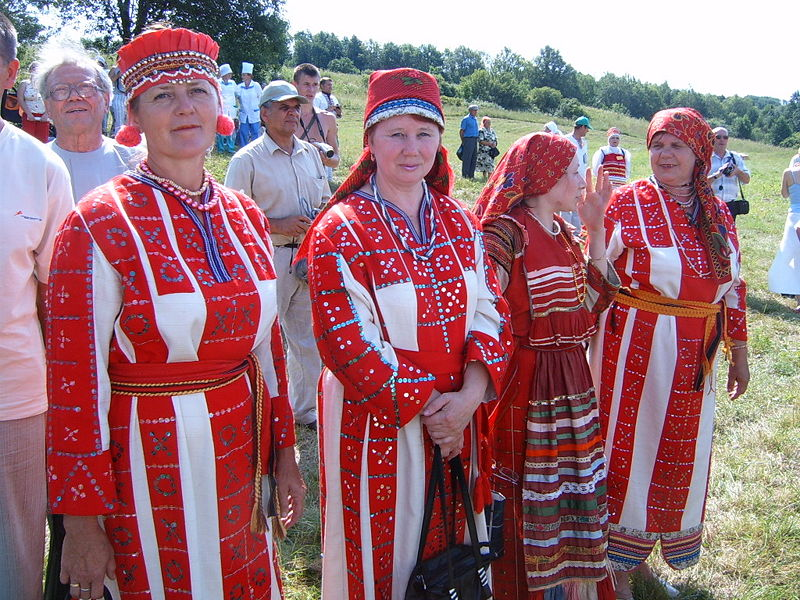
- Erzya women

Total population
- 57,008 (2010, census)

Regions with significant populations
- Russia: Mordovia

Languages
- Erzya, Russian

Religion
- Orthodox Christianity, Erzyan native religion, Lutheranism

Related ethnic groups
- Other Volga Finns, particularly Moksha

The Erzyas (also Erzyans', Erzya people; Erzya: эрзят, romanized: eŕźat, IPA: [erʲzʲɑt]; Russian: эрзяне, romanized: erzyane, IPA: [ɪrˈzʲænʲe]) are a Mordvinian Finno-Ugric ethnic group. Their native language is Erzya. They are closely related to but distinct from Mokshas, and together they are often called Mordvin peoples, especially by outsiders.

== Famous people of Erzya descent ==
- Syreś Boläeń, public figure, poet and translator, half-Erzya
- Vasily Chapayev, Bolshevik commander
- Stepan Erzia, Russian sculptor
- Yakov Grigoshin, writer
- Nadezhda Kadysheva, Russian singer
- Mariz Kemal, writer
- Purgaz, leader
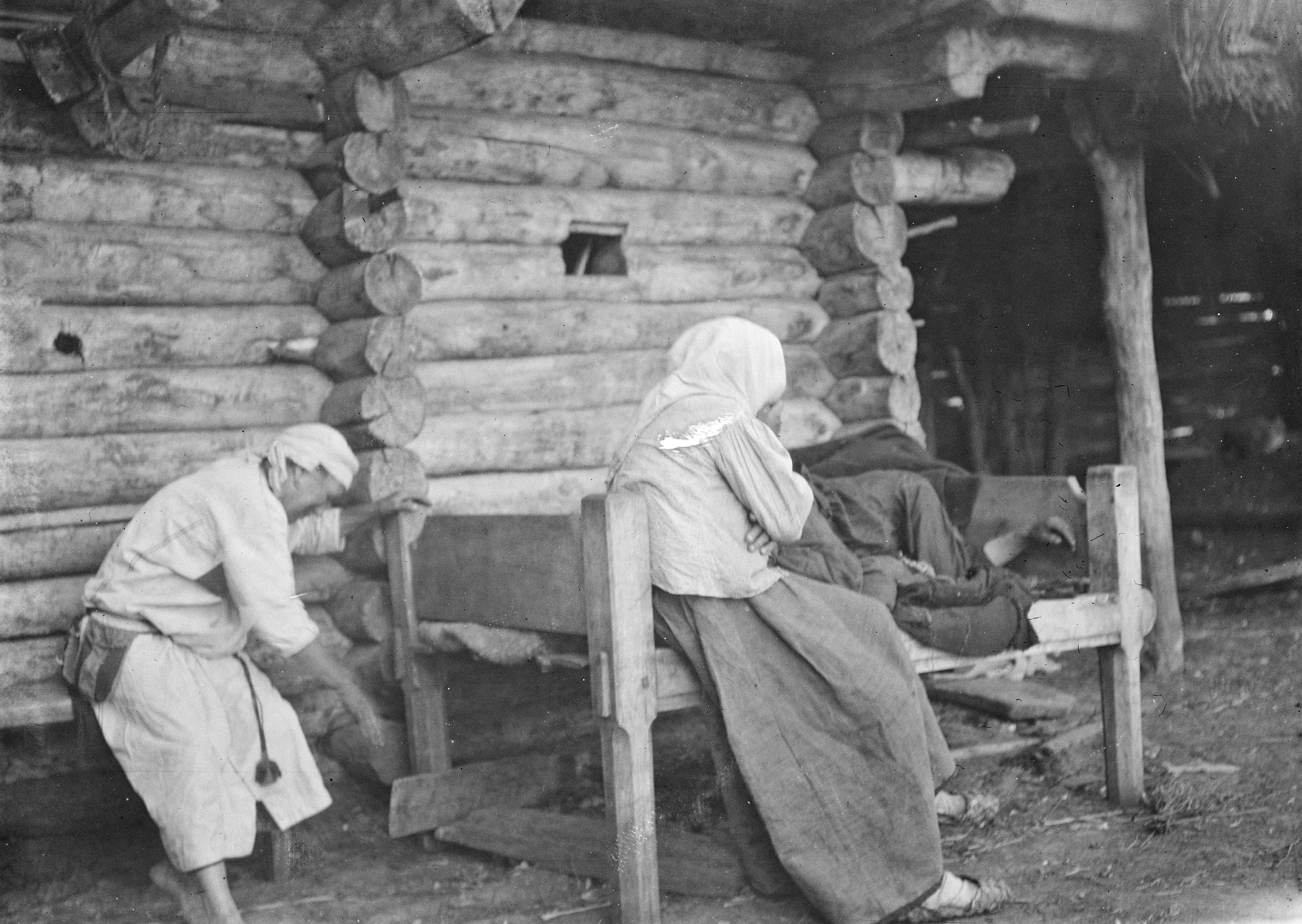
The farewell to war ritual of the Eryza people

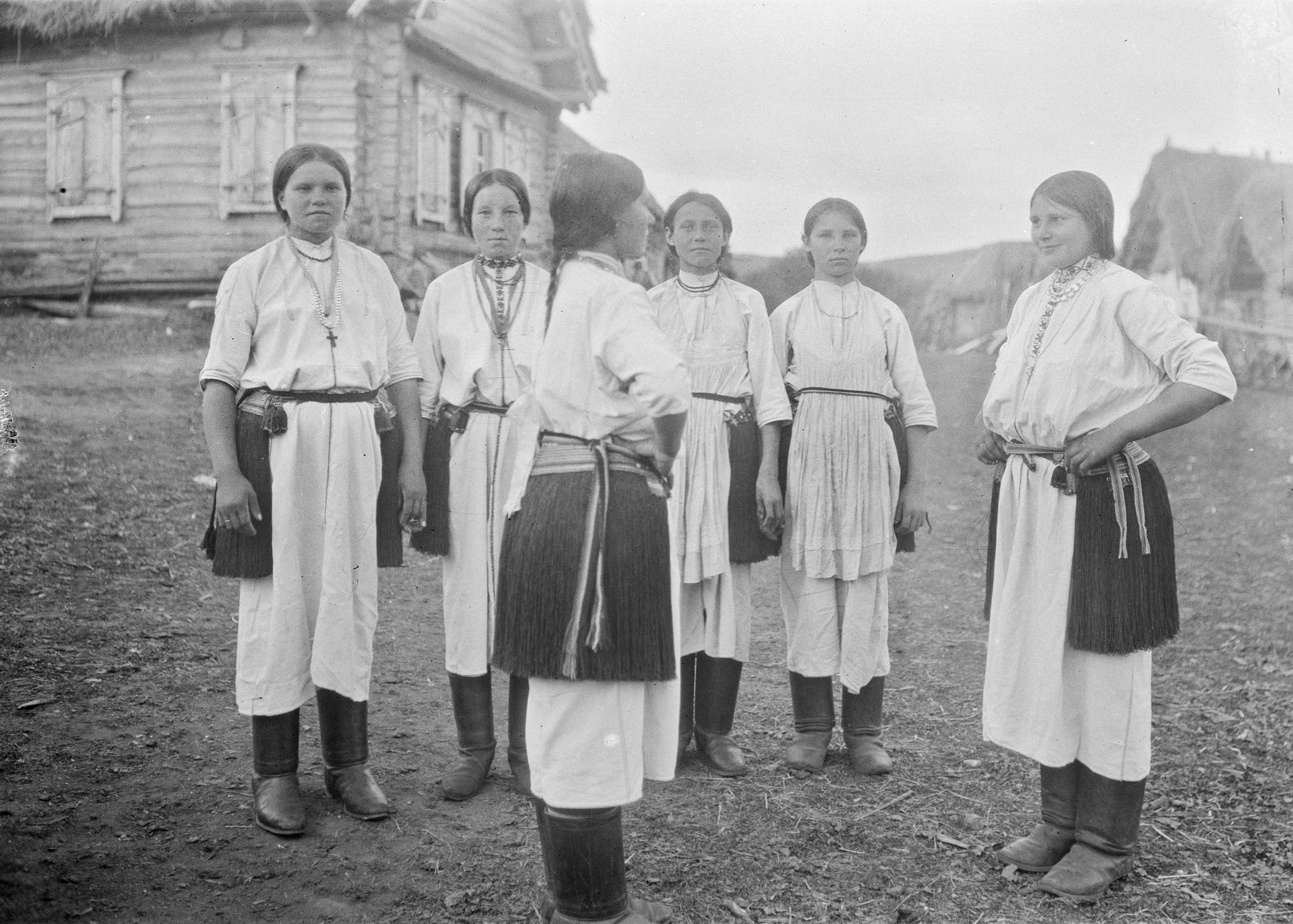
Erzya girls, 1914

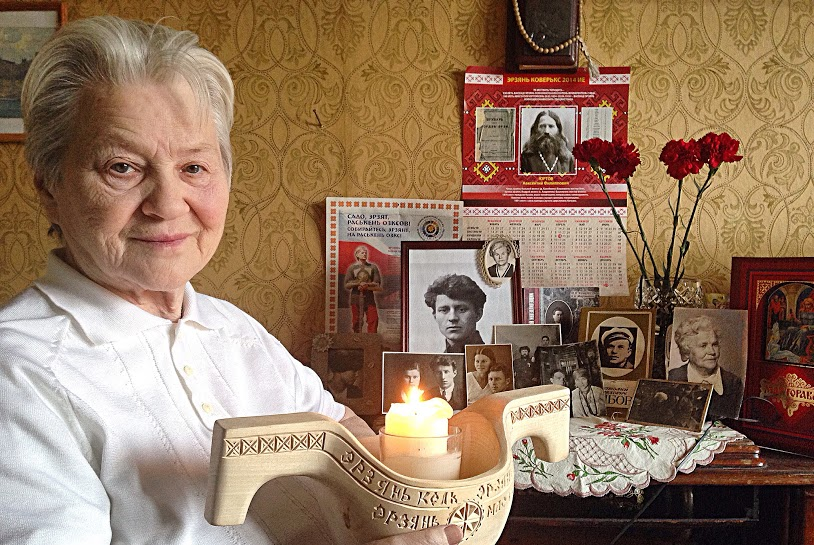
Erzya woman holding a shtatol

== See also ==
- Shoksha
