= Ras'ken' Ozks =

Erzya traditional holiday

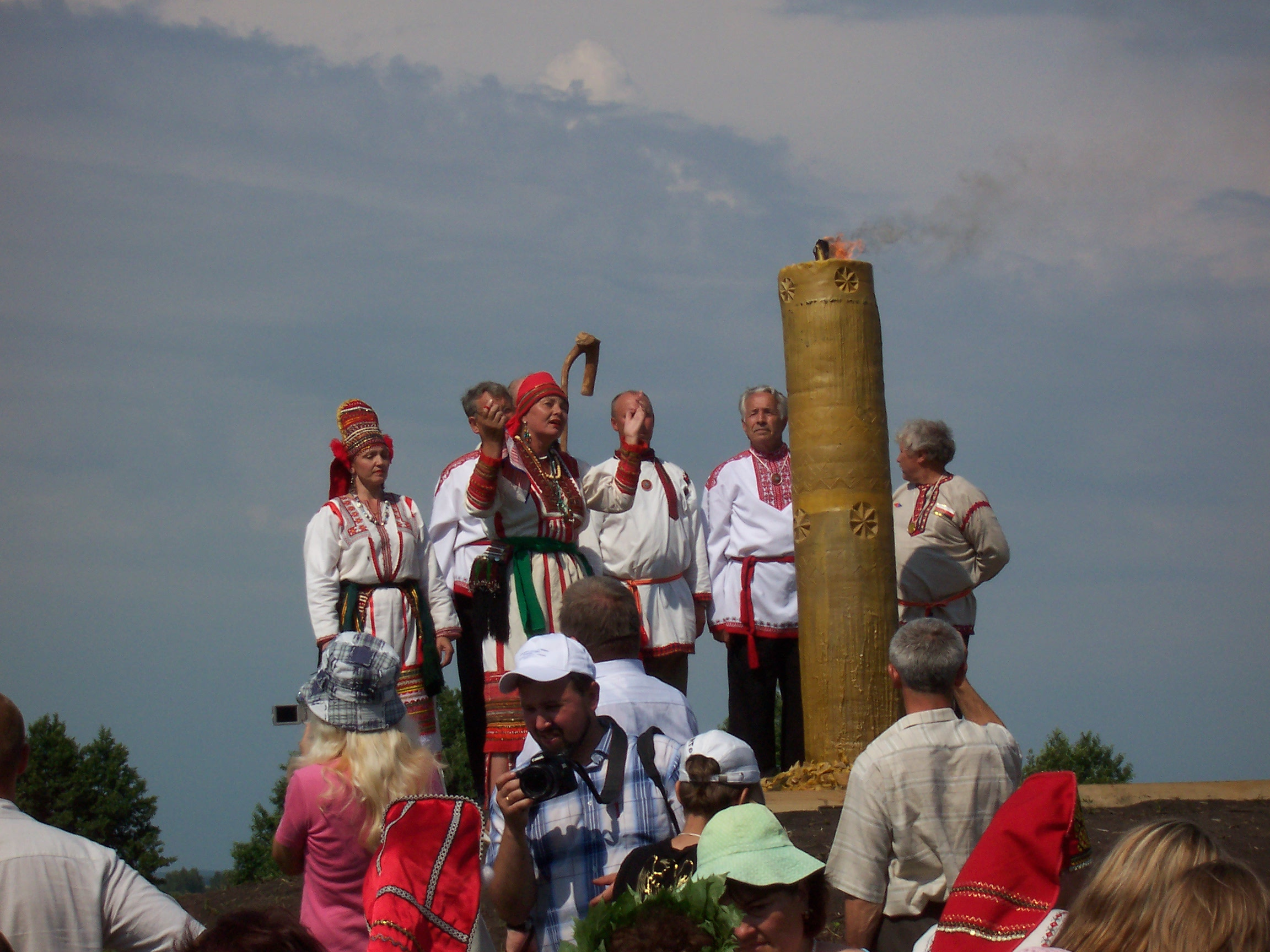
- Ras'ken' Ozks celebrations in 2007
- Observed by: Erzyas
- Type: Ethnic
- Frequency: Every three years

Ras'ken' Ozks (Russian and Erzya: Раськень Озкс) or Rasjken Ozks is a traditional Erzya holiday held every three years, and is a state national folklore day in Mordovia. It is held since 1999 in the village of Chukaly. Before that, it was last held on 25 September 1629, and after that, it was banned.

== The 1999 event ==
The first Ras'ken' Ozks in 370 years was held on 17 July 1999, in the village of Chukaly, found in Mordovia, Russia. Many visitors came to Chukaly: from Finland, Tatarstan, Moscow, Samara, Penza, Ulyanovsk, representatives of the Krasnoyarsk Krai, Murmansk Oblast, Novosibirsk, from the Erzya diaspora of Estonia, students from Finno-Ugric universities - about 2000 people gathered in total. The Rasken shtatol was lit up by Eryush Vezhay from Murmansk Oblast.

== The 2022 event ==
The 2022 event was different from other because no Erzya flags were allowed to be brought in or be placed, and all speeches were spoken in Russian.

== Event timeline ==
The start of the event is signalled by the alarming sound of a pipe, the trumpet of the legendary Tyushti, an Erzya king. Tyushti's order is, if hard times come, then you need to play the toorama and, having heard this call, he will return to his people to defend their freedom. After this, a group of people wearing white Erzya clothes walk out of the Potmaley river. The toorama plays alarming sounds, while in the center of the group, a woman carried a yandawa bowl and a small shtatol. To her sides, there are two more women, one carrying honey, and the other, a large loaf of bread, which symbolise health and longevity. They slowly reach the main candle, the Rasken shtatol, a candle believed to be the connection with God, the ancestors and is believed to be the center of the holiday. It is lit up by a woman surrounded by 4 men and is followed by a prayer from the group:

Ознотано эрицянок кис,

Ознотано раськенек кис,

Энялдтано эйденек кис....

И как сотни лет назад, обращается к предкам:

...Весе тынь – седейсэнек,

Весе тынь – минек верьсэ,

Минь тынк эстэ лисинек,

Минь тыненк велявтано.

Садо, весе садо!...

Romanized:

Oznotano Eritsyanok kitty,

Oznotano raskenek kis,

Enyaldtano eidenek kis....

And like hundreds of years ago, he addresses his ancestors:

... Vese tyn - sedeysenek,

Vese tyn - minek verse,

Min tynk este lisinek,

Min tynenko velyavtano.

Sado, all sado!...
