= Mari religion =

Ethnic religion of the Mari people

Symbol of the Mari native religion

Mari religion (Mari: Чимарий йӱла, romanized: Čimarii jüla), also called Mari paganism, is the ethnic religion of the Mari people, a Volga Finnic ethnic group based in Mari El, a republic of Russia. The religion has undergone changes over time, particularly under the influence of neighbouring monotheisms. In the last few decades, while keeping its traditional features in the countryside, an organised neopagan revival has taken place.

== History ==
Compared to neighbouring ethnic groups, Mari traditions are more archaic, albeit with influence from Islam in the Middle Ages and later Russian Orthodox Christianity in the early Modern period. In the 16th century, Mari territory functioned as a buffer between the Russian Empire and the Kazan Khanate before it came under Russian control during the Russo-Kazan Wars. When the Mari were incorporated into the Russian Empire, they were nominally converted to Christianity, but mostly continued to practice their old ethnic religion. Russian missionary efforts in the 17th–18th centuries attempted to fully convert the Mari population to Orthodoxy through coercion and exemption from taxes and military service. Some Mari fled to Bashkiria to avoid Christianisation. By the early 19th century, all peoples of the Middle Volga had been baptised. Christianity became more established on the highland side of the Volga river compared to the northern "meadow" side, where traditional sacrifices continued. In the 18th and 19th centuries, Mari religion was known to be regionally varied, and a coherent sense of Mari ethnic identity did not develop until the early 19th century.

Until 1887, mass public prayers took place regularly. While the Mari retained their traditional religion, pressure to assimilate into Orthodox Russian culture remained through the 19th century. A revival and reformist movement known as Kugu-sorta ("Great Candle") started in the 1870s, and gained influence among Mari into the early 20th century. Following the Bolshevik Revolution, Mari revivalists declared independence and called for the expulsion of Slavs in Mari territory; the Bolsheviks soon defeated them and imprisoned Mari intellectuals. Under Soviet rule, Mari religion and language was repressed, including through settlement of ethnic Russians in the area. Despite repressive policies, many aspects of Mari tradition were preserved.

In the 1980s and 1990s, Mari traditional religion saw another revival and new organisations were formed. In 1991 the Center for Mari Traditional Belief, also called Oshmarii-Chimarii ("White Mari" or "Clean Mari"), was registered and the first worship centre was established in Moscow. Public rituals, which had ceased under Soviet leadership, also began again. The revival was characterised by the creation of formal institutions adapted to urban settings. Russian historian and ethnologist Victor Schnirelmann describes it as "an attempt to build a national religion". The neopagan revival in Mari El has been closely associated with Mari Ushem, a democratic nationalist organisation which seeks to revive the Mari language and culture.

== Organisation ==
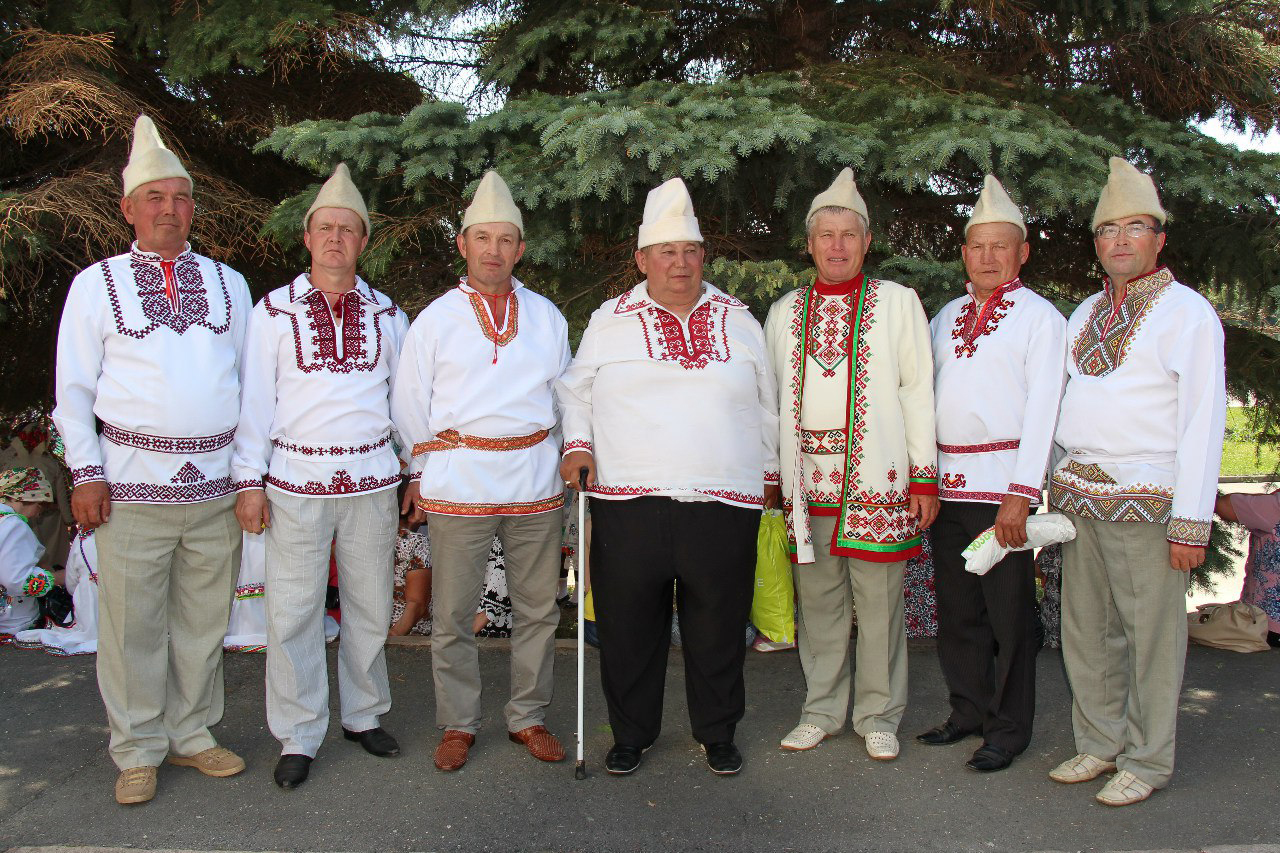
Mari priests, or karts, 2015

Mari pagans comprise three groups: the Chimari, who are unbaptised and generally reject Christianity; the Marla vera, who are baptised and practice a syncretic combination of ethnic and Christian traditions; and the Kugu sorta, who are neopagan revivalists.

Mari paganism is organised officially as "Mari Traditional Religion" (MTR) in the Mari El republic, which provides legal recognition of the religion. The MTR organisation is composed of over 100 religious groups, and includes Mari of all three categories. Mari folk belief has been incorporated into the national school curriculum in Mari El, and Mari paganism is one of the three recognised "traditional" religions of the republic along with Russian Orthodoxy and Islam.

== Beliefs ==
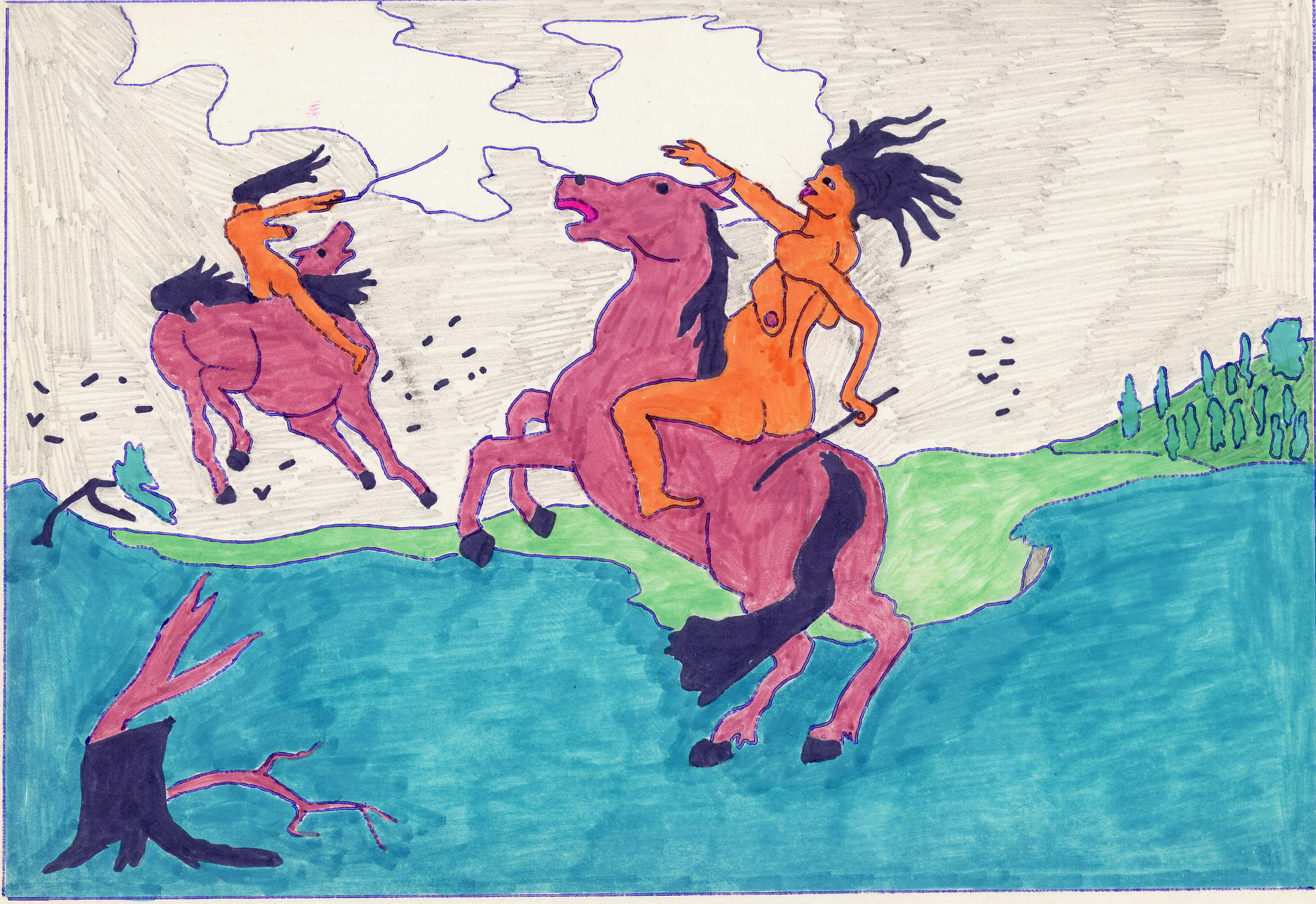
Artist's depiction of ovdy, mythological beings in Mari folklore

Mari religious belief varies between geographical regions and between urban and rural communities.

=== Mythology ===
Mari religion is henotheistic; most deities are considered manifestations of the supreme god Kugu Yumo. (Note: Kugu Yumo is etymologically connected with the Finnish Jumala, Estonian Jumal, Komi Yen, and Udmurt Inmar.) Kugu Yumo, often called Osh Poro Kugu Yumo ("Great White Good God") in prayers, is the mythological creator of the laws of the universe and protector of humanity; he is associated with the cosmos and reason.

The second-most prominent figure in Mari mythology is the ambiguous god Keremet, who acts in opposition to Kugu Yumo. Keremet is the lord of earth and particularly water. He records human misdeeds and violation of rituals and distributes punishment. He is perceived as dangerous but powerful and venerated through sacrificial rituals and consecration of trees. Eastern Mari sometimes consider him to be a protector of the Mari people. Perception of Keremet as evil originates from Christian influence, and there is variation in viewpoints between Chimari and Marla vera.

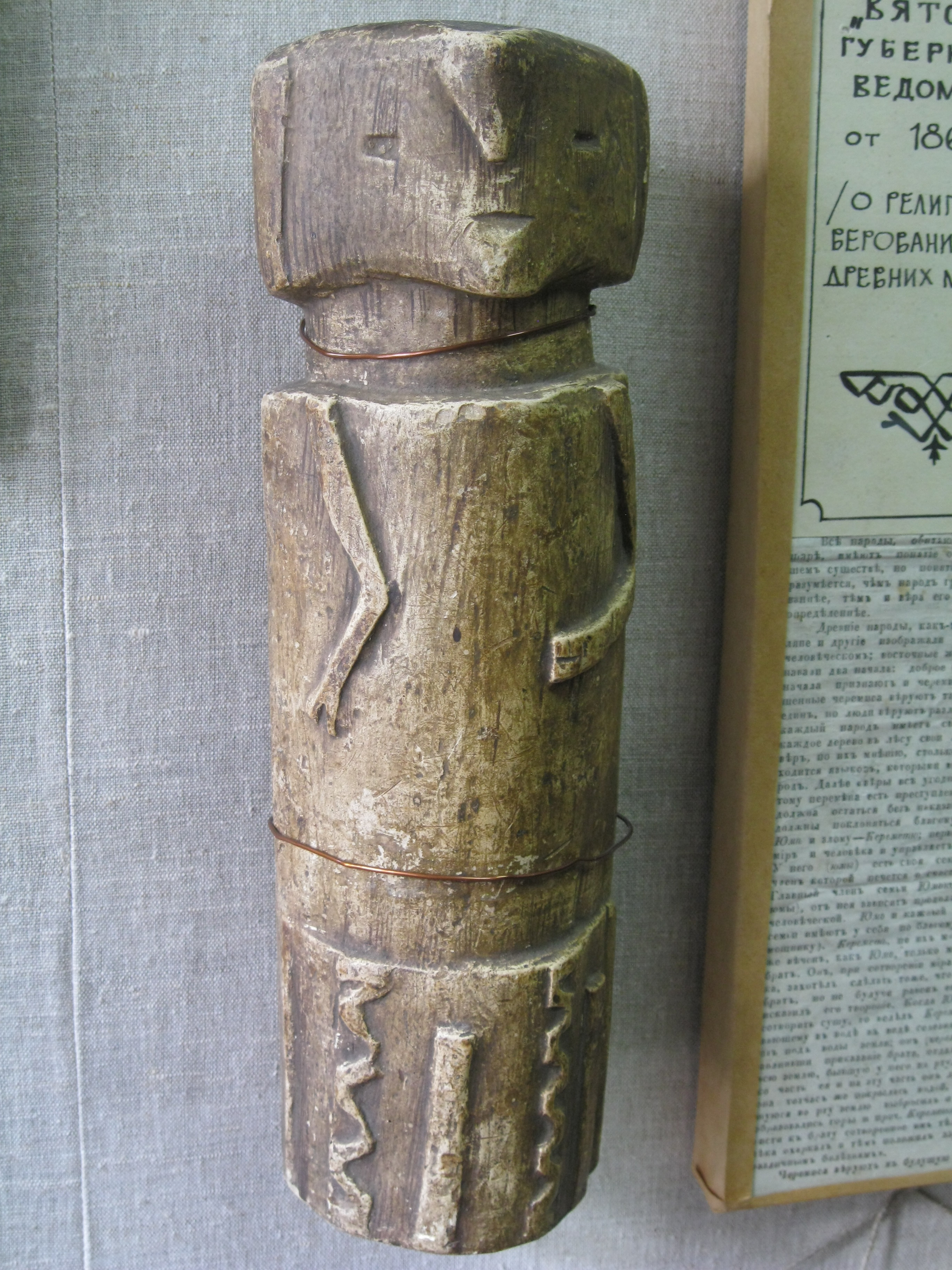
A wooden cultic image of the Northwestern Mari in the Yaransk Museum of Local History

Other divine figures are personifications of natural forces, objects, domestic animals, festivals, and human activities; particularly popular are goddess of birth Shochyn-Ava and deities who protect agriculture. These deities are typically venerated as mother goddesses, although masculine counterparts are also known. There are also angelic figures, such as Sukso, a defender of faith and protector of humans, and Piyambar, a prophetic goddess associated with divination and predestination.

In rural areas, belief in household spirits called vechory (or vesiory) is near-universal. Vechory are thought to determine the fortune of a family, and offerings are made to them for success. Male vechory and demonic entities called ovdy (or obdy) are believed to be responsible for social ills.

== Practices and rituals ==
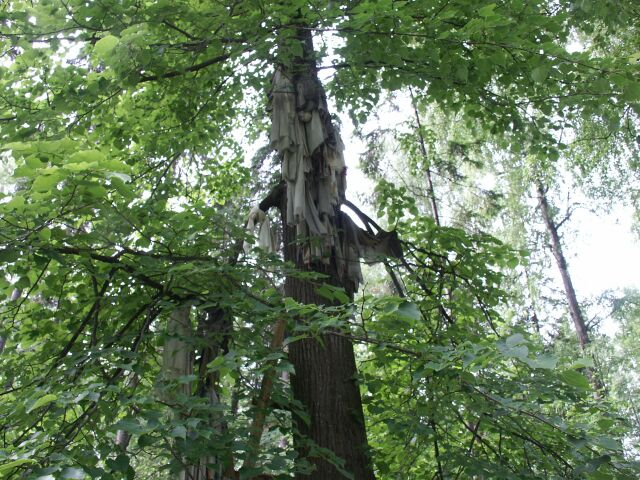
A tree decorated with offerings in a sacred grove

Mari rituals are practiced either in sacred groves or in the home. During periods of persecution, worshippers would pray in groves at night or would move worship into their homes to evade authorities.

Private family worship is led by an elder; if there is no elder present, a kart is invited to conduct the ritual. Historically, family ritual would take place in a kudo, a small wooden building also used for domestic tasks. Use of the kudo has become rare more recently.

In autumn, poultry (mainly geese) are sacrificed as thanksgiving for a good harvest and petition for a good winter. The goose is killed and eaten among close family members, and all remaining parts are burnt.

== Demographics ==
Surveys of Mari El in the mid-1990s found that around 60% of Mari are dual believers, and 5–7% are "pure" pagans. A 2006 survey found that 67.3% of Mari identify as Orthodox Christians, 11.5% identify as dual believers, and 2.5% identify with the MTR only. The true proportion of Mari who practice traditional religion is not reflected in survey results, as many Mari may identify as Orthodox while maintaining non-Christian beliefs and rituals. Outside of Mari El, the Mari populations of neighboring areas, such as Bashkortostan, Tatarstan, Udmurtia, Perm Krai, and the Ural region, have higher proportions of pagans; historically, many Mari migrated to avoid converting to Christianity.
