= Viktor Shnirelman =

Russian historian and ethnologist

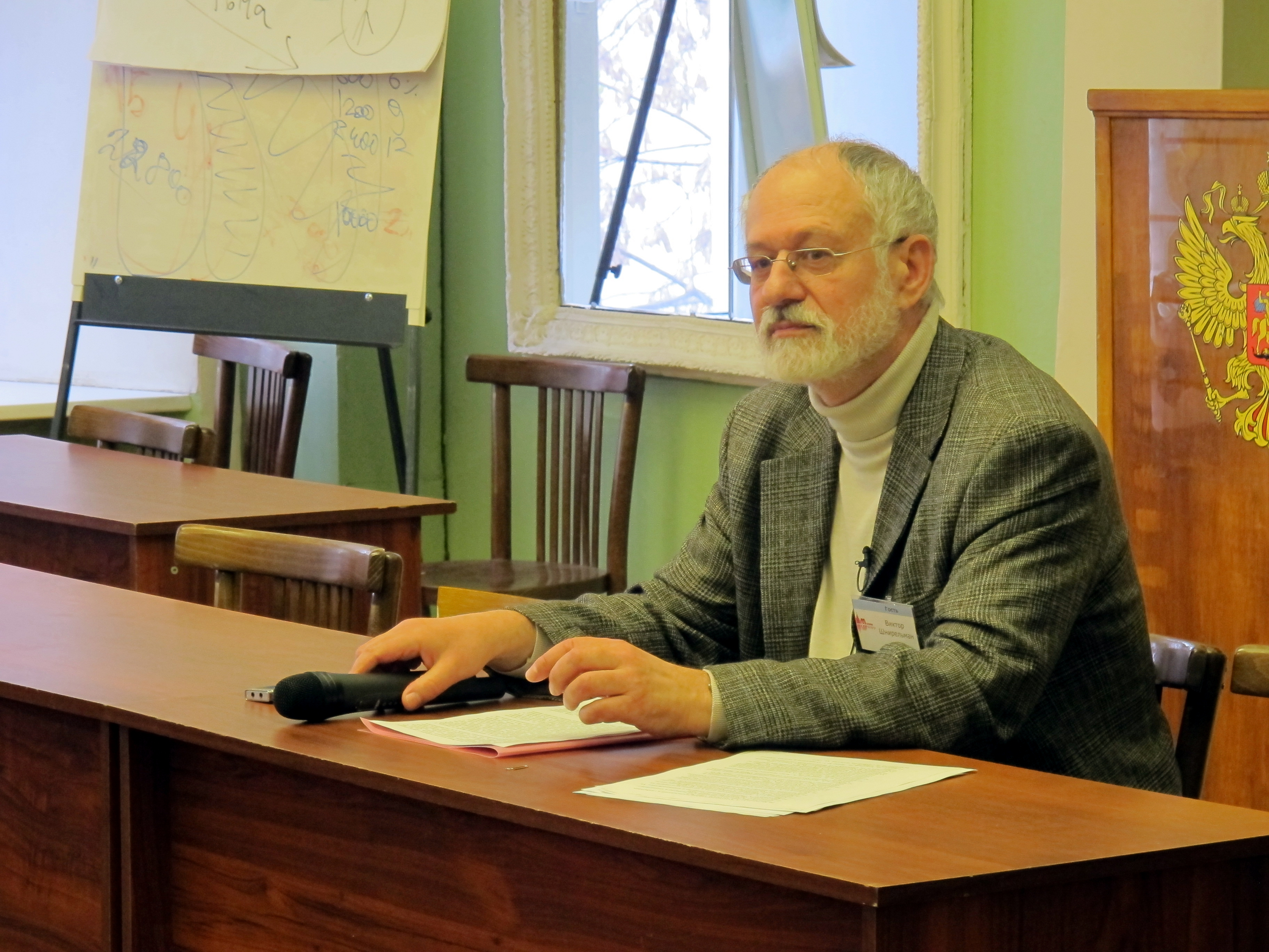
Victor Shnirelman in 2012

Viktor Aleksandrovich Shnirelman (Russian: Виктор Александрович Шнирельман, born 18 May 1949, Moscow) is a Russian historian, ethnologist and a member of Academia Europaea (since 1998). He is a senior researcher of N. N. Miklukho-Maklai Institute of Ethnology and Anthropology at the Russian Academy of Sciences and an author of over 300 works, including over 20 monographies on archaeology. Shnirelman's main fields include the ideologies of nationalism in Russia and CIS, ethnocentrism and irredentism.

Shnirelman graduated from historical faculty at Moscow State University in 1971 and in 1977 upheld a thesis in the Ethnography Institute of Soviet Academy of Sciences. In 1990, he defended a thesis in Ethnology and Anthropology Institute.

== Selected works ==
- Who gets the past? Competition for ancestors among non-Russian intellectuals in Russia. Washington D. C., Baltimore & London: Woodrow Wilson Center Press and Johns Hopkins University Press, 1996.
- The Myth of the Khazars and Intellectual Antisemitism in Russia, 1970s – 1990s. Jerusalem: The Vidal Sassoon International Center for the Study of Antisemitism, Hebrew University of Jerusalem, 2002.

=== Bibliography ===
- «Чистильщики московских улиц»: скинхеды, СМИ и общественное мнение. М.: Academia, 2007. 116 стр.
- Национализм в мировой истории / под ред. В. А. Тишкова и В. А. Шнирельмана. М.: Наука, 2007. 604 стр.
- Быть аланами. Интеллектуалы и политика на Северном Кавказе в XX веке. М.: НЛО, 2006. 690 стр.
- Очерки современного расизма. Петрозаводск: Скандинавия, 2006. 64 стр.
- Лица ненависти (антисемиты и расисты на марше). М.: Academia, 2005. 360 стр.
- Интеллектуальные лабиринты. Очерки идеологий в современной России. М.: Academia, 2004. 480 стр.
- Войны памяти: мифы, идентичность и политика в Закавказье. М.: ИКЦ Академкнига, 2003. 592 стр.
- The Myth of the Khazars and Intellectual Antisemitism in Russia, 1970s — 1990s. Jerusalem: The Vidal Sassoon *International Center for the Study of Antisemitism, Hebrew University of Jerusalem, 2002. 200 pp.
- Неоязычество на просторах Евразии / под ред. В. А. Шнирельмана. М.: Библейско-Богословский Институт, 2001. 177 стр.
- The Value of the Past. Myths, Identity and Politics in Transcaucasia. Osaka: National Museum of Ethnology (Senri Ethnological Studies, № 57), 2001. 465 pp.
- Who gets the past? Competition for ancestors among non-Russian intellectuals in Russia. Washington D. C., Baltimore & London: Woodrow Wilson Center Press and Johns Hopkins University Press, 1996. 98 pp.
- Война и мир в ранней истории человечества. В 2 тт. М.: Институт этнологии и антропологии РАН, 1994 (совместно с А. И. Першицем и Ю. И. Семеновым).
- Возникновение производящего хозяйства. М.: Наука, 1989. 448 стр.
- Отдельные главы в кн.: История первобытного общества. Т. 1-3. М., Наука, 1983—1988.
- Происхождение скотоводства. М., Наука, 1980. 333 стр.
- Шнирельман, В. А. (2006). Bytʹ alanami : intellektualy i politika na Severnom Kavkaze v XX veke. Moskva: Novoe literaturnoe obozrenie. ISBN 5-86793-406-3. OCLC 69903474.
- Шнирельман В. А. «Цепной пес расы»: диванная расология как защитница «белого человека»
- Шнирельман В. А. Евразийцы и евреи
- Шнирельман В. А. Очарование седой древности: Мифы о происхождении в современных школьных учебниках
- Шнирельман В. А. «Светлые арийцы» и «посланцы темных сил»: заметки об особенностях современной антисемитской и расистской пропаганды
- Шнирельман, В. А. (2003). Voĭny pami︠a︡ti : mify, identichnostʹ i politika v Zakavkazʹe. Moskva: Akademkniga. ISBN 5-94628-118-6. OCLC 60402255.
- Шнирельман В. А. Российская школа и национальная идея
- Шнирельман В. А. Возвращение арийства: научная фантастика и расизм

=== Reviews ===
- Гутнов Ф. Тяжело быть аланом? (рецензия на книгу В. А. Шнирельмана «Быть аланами. Интеллектуалы и политика на Северном Кавказе в XX веке.»
- Напольских В. Заметки на полях: Неоязычество на просторах Евразии // Вестник Евразии / Acta Eurasica. №1. Москва, 2002.
- Чочиев А. «Подспудное» и «гробовое» в панегирике Шнирельману (по книгам «Войны памяти» М., 2003 и «Быть аланами» М., 2006)
