= Aleksey Novikov-Priboy =

Russian author (1877–1944)

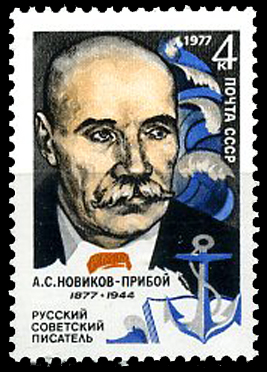
- 1977 Soviet postage stamp honoring Novikov-Priboy
- Born: Aleksey Silantyevich Novikov; 24 March 1877; Village Matveyevskoye, Spassky Uyezd, Tambov Governorate, Russian Empire
- Died: 29 April 1944 (aged 67); Moscow, RSFSR, Soviet Union
- Occupation: Writer
- Writing career
- Genres: Novel, novella, short story, sketch story
- Notable work: Tsushima

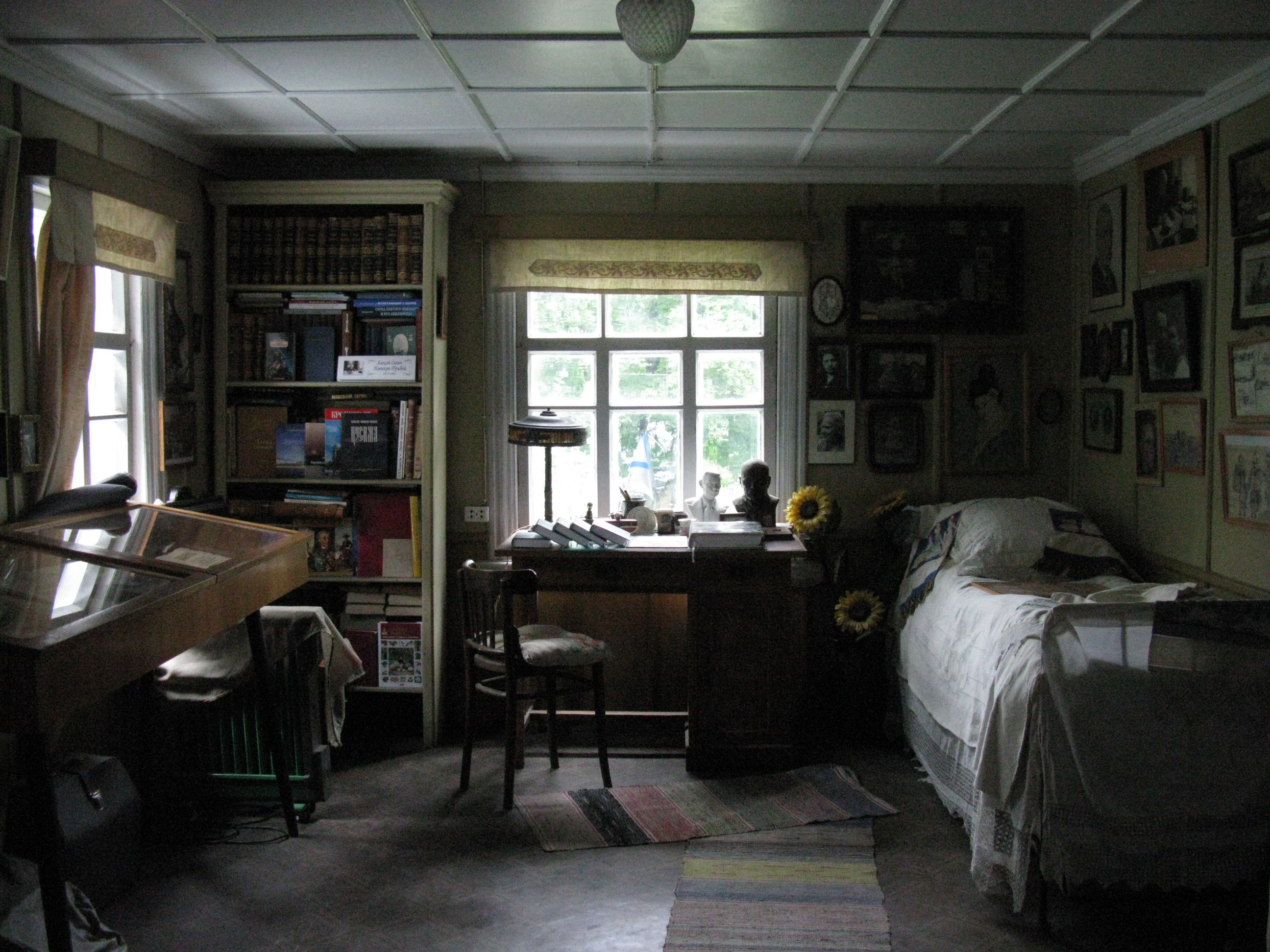
Room from Novikov-Priboy's dacha near Moscow

Aleksey Silych Novikov-Priboy (Russian: Алексей Силыч Новиков-Прибой; real name Aleksey Silantyevich Novikov, Russian: Алексей Силантьевич Новиков; 24 March 1877 – 29 April 1944) was a Russian and Soviet writer and marine artist, noted for his stories with a nautical theme.

== Biography ==
Novikov-Priboy was the second son of a peasant family from Matveyevskoye village of the Spassky Uyezd. His mother, of Polish descent, had hoped that he would enter the church as a monk, but he was attracted to the thought of adventure by hearing stories from travelling sailors, and volunteered for the Imperial Russian Navy instead. He served as a seaman with the Russian Baltic Fleet from 1899 to 1906. He became involved with revolutionary activities from an early age and after publishing an article in a Kronstadt newspaper in 1903, was arrested from spreading "subversive propaganda". However, due to the Russo-Japanese War of 1904–05, he was soon released, and with his records marked "unreliable" was transferred to the 2nd Pacific Squadron's battleship Oryol, on which he participated at the climactic Battle of Tsushima.

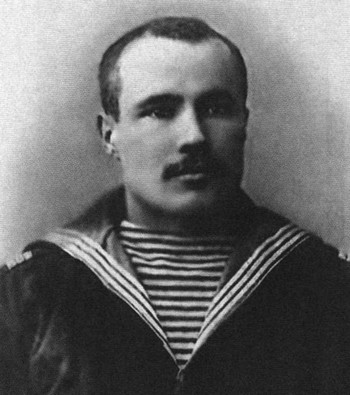
Alexander Novikov during his service in the Navy, 1905

Taken as a prisoner of war by the Japanese, while in prison camp he began gathering stories from fellow survivors. After the war, he returned to his hometown and began writing, and his first works describing the war in highly critical terms were published in 1906. He soon fell foul of the tsarist authorities however, who banned his works, and Novikov-Priboy was forced to go into hiding. He fled to Finland in 1907, and between 1907 and 1913 lived in England, visiting France, Spain, North Africa and Capri, where he befriended the exiled Maxim Gorky, who provided him with advice on his writing. Novikov-Priboy supported himself working part-time as a blacksmith, accountant, and as a merchant sailor. He returned to Russia in 1913 under a false passport.

During World War I, from 1915 to 1918, Novikov-Priboy worked on hospital trains, and afterwards settling at Barnaul, where he lived until 1920 in a commune with fellow writers and artists. His first collection of short stories, Sea Stories, was published in 1917 after some difficulties with the publishers. Novikov-Priboy's early works were influenced by Gorky and are part of the mainstream of Russian realistic literature. These include classic "seafaring" works, including (the novella The Call of the Sea (1919) and the novels The Submariners (1923) and The Salty Font (1929).

From 1920, Novikov-Priboy began work on a historical epic Tsushima, and was able to access government archives. The first part of the book was published in 1932, and the second part was awarded the Stalin Prize, (2nd degree). The novel describes the heroism of Russian sailors and certain officers, the increase in revolutionary activity, and what he considered criminal negligence of the Imperial Russian Naval command.

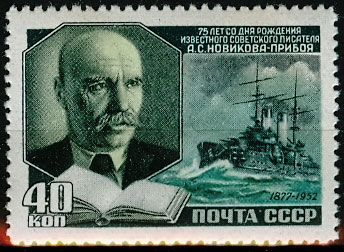
Novikov-Priboy on a 1952 stamp

After the start of World War II, Novikov-Priboy continued to publish works about the navy. He died in 1944 in Moscow, with his final novel Captain First Class, unfinished. His grave is at the Novodevichy Cemetery. Novikov-Priboy was honored by commemorative postage stamps issued in 1952 and 1977, and numerous streets in the former Soviet Union were named after him. His honors include Order of the Red Banner of Labour and Medal "For the Defence of Moscow".

In 1969, his daughter opened a private museum in his honor, at his former dacha at Cherkizovo, near Pushkino, Moscow Oblast.

== English translations ==
- The Captain, Hutchinson International, 1946.
- The Sea Beckons, Foreign Languages Publishing House, Moscow, 1965.
- Tsushima, Hyperion Press, 1978.
