= Alexander Lodygin =

Russian electrical engineer and inventor

Alexander Nikolayevich Lodygin
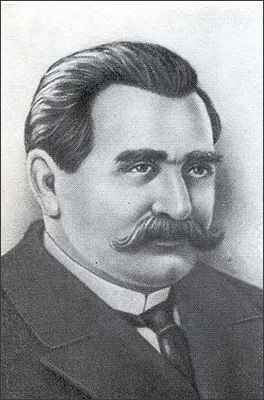
- Pronunciation: Александр Николаевич Лодыгин
- Born: October 6, 1847; Lipetsky Uyezd, Tambov Governorate, Russian Empire
- Died: March 16, 1923 (aged 75); Brooklyn, New York City, New York, USA
- Other name: Alexandre de Lodyguine (after immigration)
- Occupations: Electrical engineer, inventor

Alexander Nikolayevich Lodygin, known after immigration to US as Alexandre de Lodyguine (Russian: Александр Николаевич Лодыгин; October 6, 1847 – March 16, 1923) was a Russian electrical engineer and inventor, one of the inventors of the incandescent light bulb.

Alexander Nikolayevich Lodygin was born in Stenshino village, Tambov Governorate, Russian Empire. His parents were of a very old and noble family (descendants of Andrei Kobyla like Romanovs), but of very moderate means. He studied at the Tambov Cadet School (1859–1865). Then he served in the 71st Belev regiment, and in 1866–1868 studied at the Moscow Infantry School. Soon after graduation from his military school he retired from the military and worked as a worker at the Tula weapons factory.

== Timeline ==
- 1872: He decided to go to Saint Petersburg to attend lectures at Saint Petersburg Institute of Technology and to start working on an electrical helicopter (electrolyot). The electrical helicopter would need some sort of artificial lighting that would have to be electrical. He decided to start his helicopter work by developing a source of electrical light for it.
- 1872: He applied for a Russian patent for his filament lamp. He also patented this invention in Austria, Britain, France, and Belgium. For a filament, Lodygin used a very thin carbon rod, placed under a bell-glass.
- August 1873: He demonstrated prototypes of his electric filament lamp in the physics lecture hall of the Saint Petersburg Institute of Technology.
- 1873–1874: He conducted experiments with electric lighting on ships, city streets, etc.
- 11 July 1874: He was granted the Russian patent, as patent number 1619.
- In 1874, the Petersburg Academy of Sciences awarded him with a Lomonosov Prize for his invention of the filament lamp. That same year, Lodygin established the Electric Lighting Company, A.N. Lodygin and Co.
- 1875: From here on he was very interested in the socialist ideas of the Narodniks.
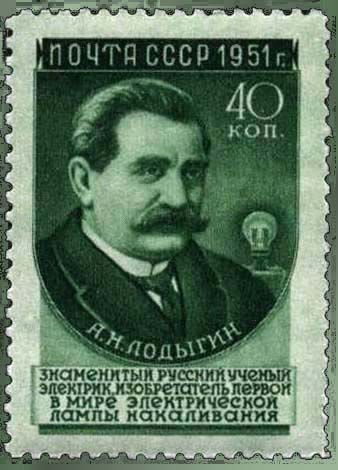
- on 1951 Soviet postal stamp
  1880s: After Narodniks killed Emperor Alexander II of Russia, there were repressions against their organization.
- 1884: As a result, he had to emigrate from Russia to France and United States.
- 1895: He married the German reporter Alma Schmidt, the daughter of an electrical engineer.
- 1890s: He invented a few types of filament lamps with metallic filaments; some say he was the first scientist to use a tungsten filament. He got a patent for lamps with tungsten filaments (US Patent No. 575,002 Illuminant for Incandescent Lamps, Application on 4 January 1893) and sold it to General Electric (1906), who began the first industrial production of such lamps.
- 1899: Petersburg Institute of Electrical Engineering awarded Lodygin with the honorary title of electrical engineer.
- 1907: Lodygin returned to Russia. He continued work on a series of his inventions, including a new type of electrical motor, electrical welding, tungsten alloys, electrical ovens and smelting furnaces. He taught at Petersburg Institute of Electrical Engineering and worked for the Petersburg railroad.
- 1914: He was sent by the Ministry of Agriculture to develop plans for electrification of Olonets and Novgorod governorates.
- After the February Revolution Lodygin emigrated to United States. Because of health problems he declined a Soviet offer to work for their State Plan for Electrification of Russia (1918).
- 1923: He died in Brooklyn in New York.

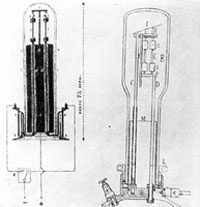
Lodygin's lamps

He invented an incandescent light bulb before Thomas Edison, but it was not commercially profitable. The lamp with a tungsten filament is indeed the only design used now, but in 1906 they were too expensive.

Several Lodygin's ideas were implemented much later, even after his death. In 1871 Lodygin proposed an autonomous diving apparatus that consisted of a steel mask, natural rubber costume, accumulator battery and a special apparatus for electrolysis of water. The diver was supposed to breathe the oxygen-hydrogen mix obtained by electrolysis of water. The invented diving apparatus was very similar to modern scuba equipment

His ideas for an electrical helicopter were used many years later by Igor Sikorsky.
