= Sergey Terpigorev =

Russian writer

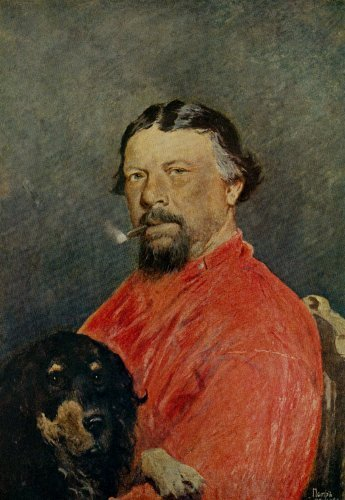
- Portrait by Pyotr P. Sokolov, c. 1885
- Born: May 24, 1841; Usmansky Uyezd, Tambov Governorate, Russian Empire
- Died: June 25, 1895 (aged 54); St. Petersburg, Russian Empire
- Resting place: Blagoveshchensky Cemetery, St. Petersburg

Sergey Nikolayevich Terpigorev (Russian: Серге́й Никола́евич Терпиго́рев; May 24, 1841 – June 25, 1895) was a Russian writer.

== Biography ==
Terpigorev was born on May 24, 1841, in the village of Nikolsky in the Usmansky Uyezd of Tambov Governorate (now Dobrinsky District, Lipetsk Oblast) into an impoverished noble family. He attended grammar school, and in 1861-62, studied at Saint Petersburg State University. For his involvement in student unrest he was exiled and sent to the family estate of his mother, where he lived for five years under police surveillance.

During this period he decided to gather material for essays on social topics. He sent them to the magazine Russian Word (Russkoye Slovo) and the St. Petersburg newspaper The Voice (Golos). These essays denounced fraud and embezzlement, and showed the hard life of the common people.

In 1867, when his term of exile ended, Terpigorev again went to St. Petersburg. He published a series of essays on life in the steppe in the popular magazine Notes of the Fatherland, which he signed with the pseudonym "Sergey Atava". In these essays he commented on the poor state of affairs after the Emancipation reform of 1861.

In January 1880 he published a series of essays about poverty in Notes of the Fatherland. He then published Disturbed Shadows, a collection of essays which brought him literary fame. Subsequent collections included The Yellow Book (Uzorochnaya Pestryad) and Historical Stories and Memories.

In his later years he worked on his novel The Ice Broke, but was unable to finish it. He died in St. Petersburg on June 25, 1895.
