= Flyorov =

Flyorov (Russian: Флёров) may refer to:

- Georgy Flyorov (1913–1990), a Soviet nuclear physicist
- Ivan Flyorov (1905–1941), the commander of the first battery of Katyusha rocket artillery during the World War II
- Konstantin Konstantinovich Flyorov (1904–1980), a Soviet paleontologist and paleoartist.
