= General Rodin =

General Rodin may refer to:

- Alexey Rodin (1902–1955), Soviet Army colonel general
- Georgy Rodin (1897–1976), Soviet Army lieutenant general
- Viktor Rodin (1928–2011), Soviet Army colonel general
