= Paisi Kaysarov =

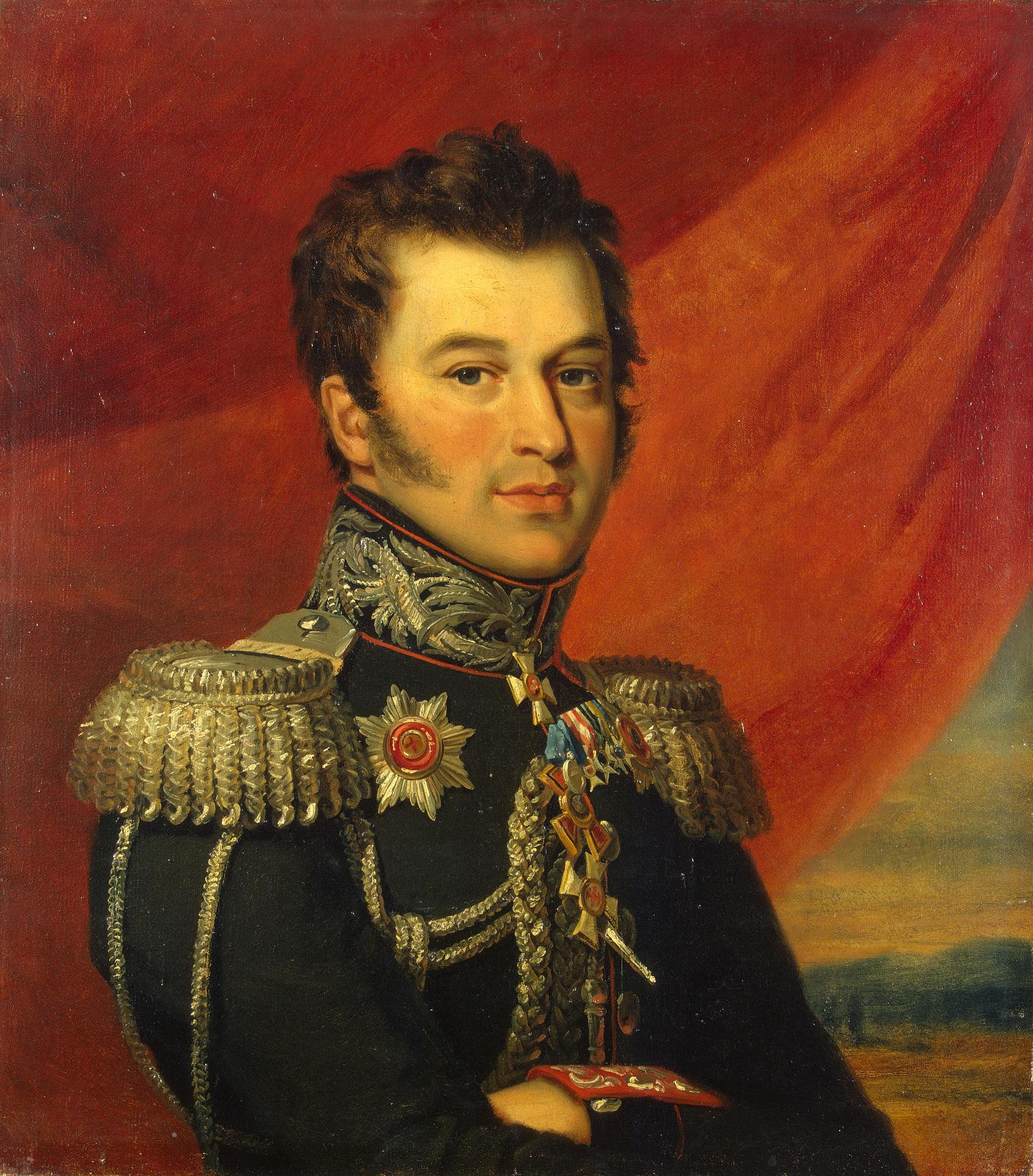
- Portrait by George Dawe
- Born: 23 May 1783; Morshansky Uyezd, Tambov Governorate, Russian Empire
- Died: 27 February 1844 (aged 60); Nice, Kingdom of the French
- Burial place: Kyiv Pechersk Lavra
- Military career
- Allegiance: (Russia) Russian Empire (1791 – 1842)
- Service years: 1791 - 1842
- Rank: General
- Conflicts: War of the Third Coalition; Russo-Turkish War; French invasion of Russia; War of the Sixth Coalition; November Uprising
- Awards: Order of St. Alexander Nevsky; Order of St. Anna, 1st class Order of St. George, 3rd class Virtuti Militari, 2nd class Order of the Red Eagle, 2st class Military Order of Maria Theresa, 3rd class Order of the Sword; Order of St. Vladimir, 1st class Gold Sword for Bravery (2); Military Order of Max Joseph

Paisi Sergeevich Kaysarov (Paisii Sergeevich Kaisarov; Russian: Паи́сий Серге́евич Кайса́ров; 23 May 1783 – 27 February 1844) was a Russian general who served during the Napoleonic Wars.

== Biography ==
=== Early life ===
Kaisarov was born in the Morshansk Uyezd, a sub-division of Tambov Governorate. He was a descendant to an old, yet poor noble family, the ancestors of which purportedly originated from the Golden Horde and arrived at Moscow in the middle of the 15th Century. He was educated by private tutors. On 2 May 1791, he joined the Preobrazhensky Regiment at the rank of a sergeant, and was accepted as an ensign to the Yaroslavl Musketeer Regiment on 2 February 1797. In early 1805 he retired from the army and became an official in the Ministry of Commerce, but returned on 14 August that year, receiving the position of a staff Rotmister in the Izumsk Hussar Regiment on the 26th. He was brother to Russian poet Andrey Kaysarov, and later married Varvara Yakovlevna Lanskaya, niece of Alexander Lanskoy.

=== Napoleonic Wars ===
Kaisarov served in the War of the Third Coalition during 1805, and was severely wounded in the Battle of Austerlitz. On 11 February 1806, he was given the rank of a lieutenant in the Semenovsky Regiment. He was sent to the Danubian Principalities and participated in the Russo-Turkish War, serving at the army's headquarters. On 17 October 1811, he was promoted to colonel.

From 19 June 1812 to 20 August, he was the chief of the Sevastopol Infantry Regiment, and then became adjutant to General Mikhail Kutuzov, at whose side he remained in the Battle of Borodino. From October, he commanded the vanguard of Matvei Platov's Don Cossacks Corps. On 14 March 1813 he was promoted to major general, with seniority dating to 7 September. In the War of the Sixth Coalition, he headed a cavalry detachment, which took part in the Battle of Hanau and the Battle of Arcis-sur-Aube.

=== Later years ===
As the war ended, he remained in the military. On 10 August 1817, he was given command of the 23rd Division's 2nd Brigade. On 18 August 1819, he became chief of staff to the 1st Infantry Corps. On 2 October 1821, he had been given command of the 14th Division, and promoted to lieutenant general on 13 January 1826. In March 1829, he became chief of staff to the 1st Army. In 1830 and 1831, he took part in the suppression of the Polish insurrection of 1830-31; his forces besieged and eventually captured the Zamość Fortress. On 25 March 1831, he was instated as commander of the 3rd Infantry Corps (later to become the 5th Infantry Corps). On 18 December 1833, he was promoted to General of the Infantry. In 1835, he was transferred command the 4th Infantry Corps. On 5 November 1842, he retired from the armed forces due to poor health, spending the remainder of his days as a member of the Governing Senate of the Russian Empire. He died in Nice. He is buried in the cemetery of the Church of the Nativity of the Blessed Virgin, near the Far Caves of the Kyiv Pechersk Lavra.

Kaysarov makes a brief appearance in Leo Tolstoy's War and Peace. His only daughter married Baron Gustave de Romand.
