= Spassky Uyezd (Tambov Governorate) =

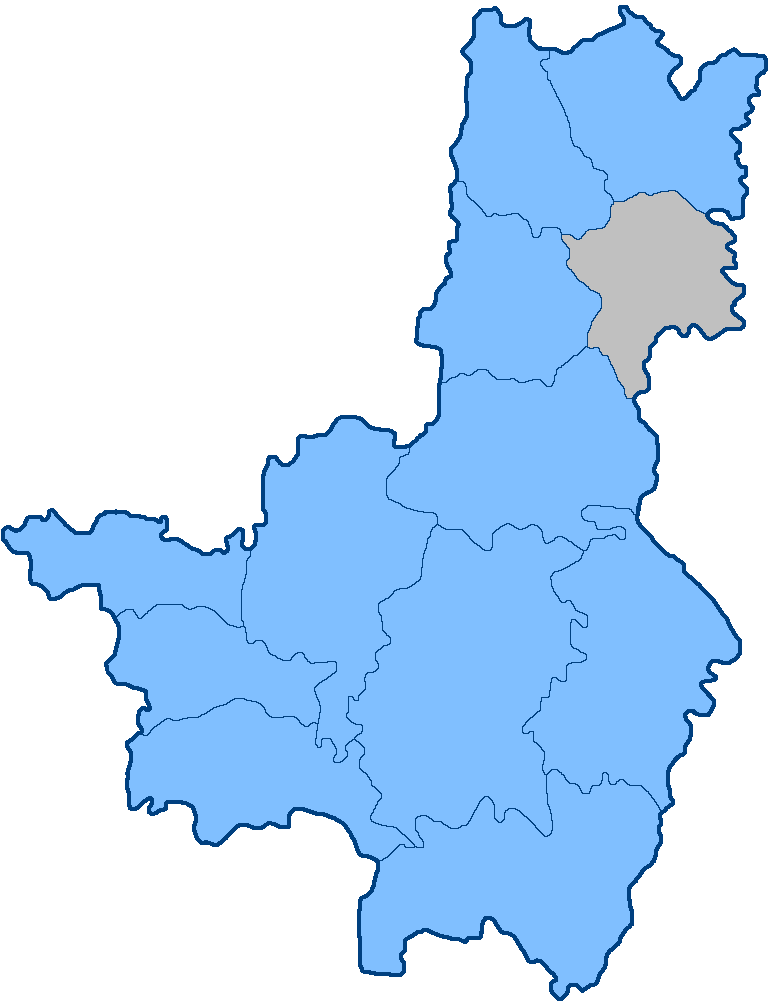
Spassky District on the map of Tambov Governorate

Spassky Uyezd (Спасский уезд) was one of the subdivisions of the Tambov Governorate of the Russian Empire. It was situated in the northeastern part of the governorate. Its administrative centre was Spassk. In terms of present-day administrative borders, the territory of Spassky Uyezd is divided between the Spassky and Zemetchinsky districts of Penza Oblast, the Torbeyevsky and Zubovo-Polyansky districts of Mordovia and Sasovsky District of Ryazan Oblast.

== Demographics ==
At the time of the Russian Empire Census of 1897, Spassky Uyezd had a population of 121,366. Of these, 51.6% spoke Russian, 46.4% Mordvin and 1.8% Tatar as their native language.
