= Ivan Flyorov =

Soviet Army officer (1905–1941)

- Native name: Иван Андреевич Флёров
- Born: 24 April 1905; Dvurechki, Lipetsky Uyezd, Tambov Governorate, Russian Empire
- Died: 7 October 1941 (aged 36) Bogatyr, Ugransky District, Smolensk Oblast, Russian SFSR, Soviet Union
- Allegiance: Soviet Union
- Branch: Red Army
- Rank: Captain
- Awards: Hero of the Russian Federation; Hero of the Soviet Union; Order of the Patriotic War; Order of the Red Star

Ivan Andreyevich Flyorov (Russian: Иван Андреевич Флёров; 24 April 1905 – 7 October 1941), was a captain in the Red Army in command of the first battery of 8 Katyushas (BM-8), which was formed in Lipetsk and on 14 July 1941, who was deployed in a battle against the German army at Orsha in Belarus, with devastating effect on the enemy causing massive casualties: a single salvo destroyed several German freight trains with ammunition, fuel, and tanks, annihilating the station itself. The second blow destroyed a bridge across the river Orshica, that connected to Minsk-Moscow highway, simultaneously the German 17th Panzer Division got under a shocking fire blow, as a result of shock damage the 17th Panzer Division of Wehrmacht was unable to recover its forces for more than three days.

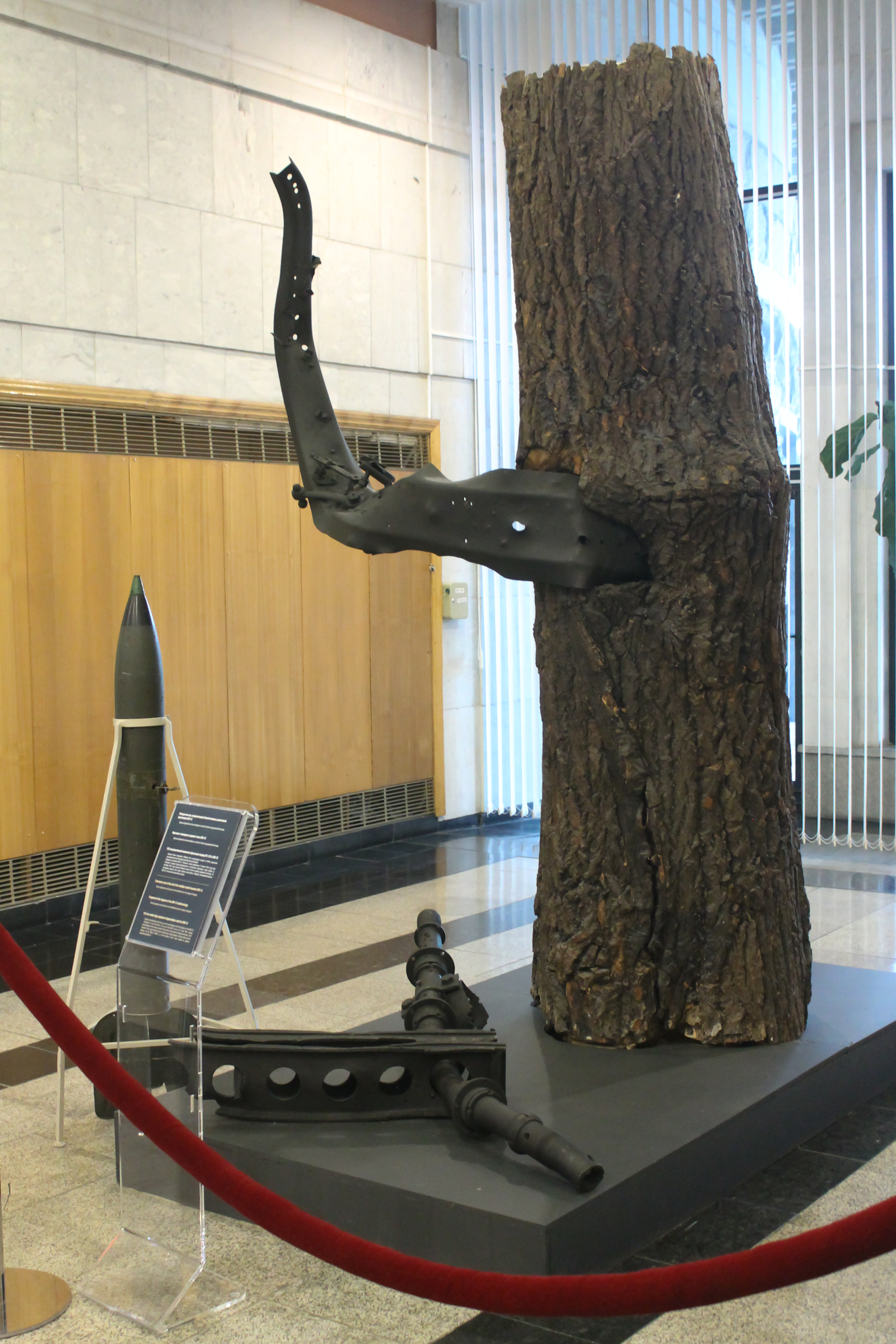
A fragment of a tree from the place of the death of Ivan Flerov

In autumn 1941, Flyorov's battery was surrounded in the swamps by the Ugra River and heavily shelled by mortars. After running out of ammunition, Captain Flyorov ordered his men to destroy the remaining weaponry. During the battle Flyorov was killed together with over 75% of his command.

In an interview with the newspaper Trud, Matvey Blanter, composer of the song "Katyusha", said that while visiting the place of the event, he found a tree with a Katyusha guiding rail stuck in the trunk, and had it placed in the Museum of the Great Patriotic War, Moscow.

On 21 June 1995, in honor of the 50th anniversary of victory over Germany, he was posthumously awarded the Hero of the Russian Federation.

== See also ==
- List of Heroes of the Russian Federation
