= Council at Fili =

1812 military council

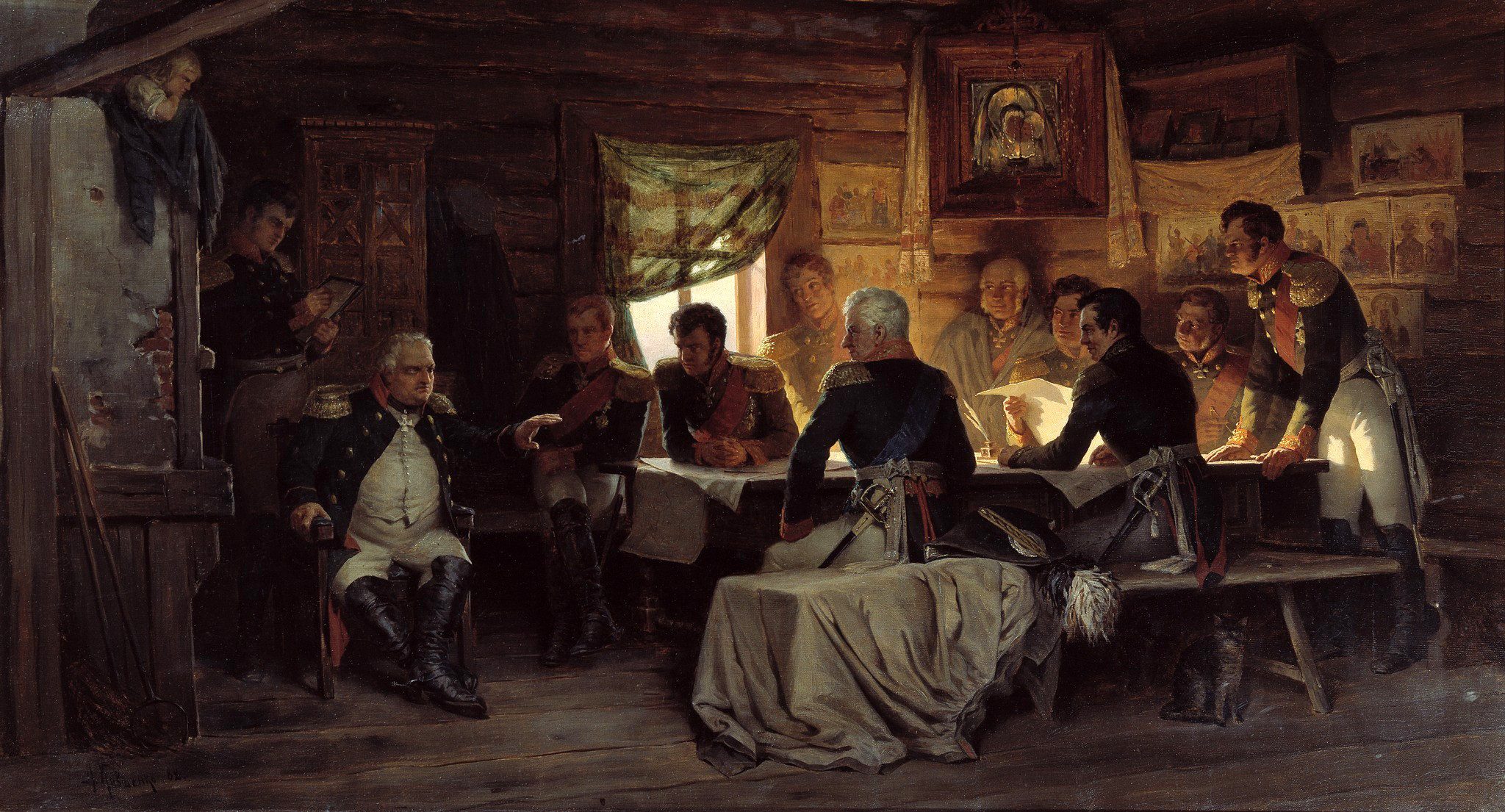
Painting by Alexei Kivshenko "Military Council at Fili" (1880). Officers from left to right: Kaisarov, Kutuzov, Konovnitsyn, Rayevsky, Ostermann-Tolstoy, Bennigsen, Barclay de Tolly, Uvarov, Toll, Dokturov, Ermolov.

French invasion of Russia
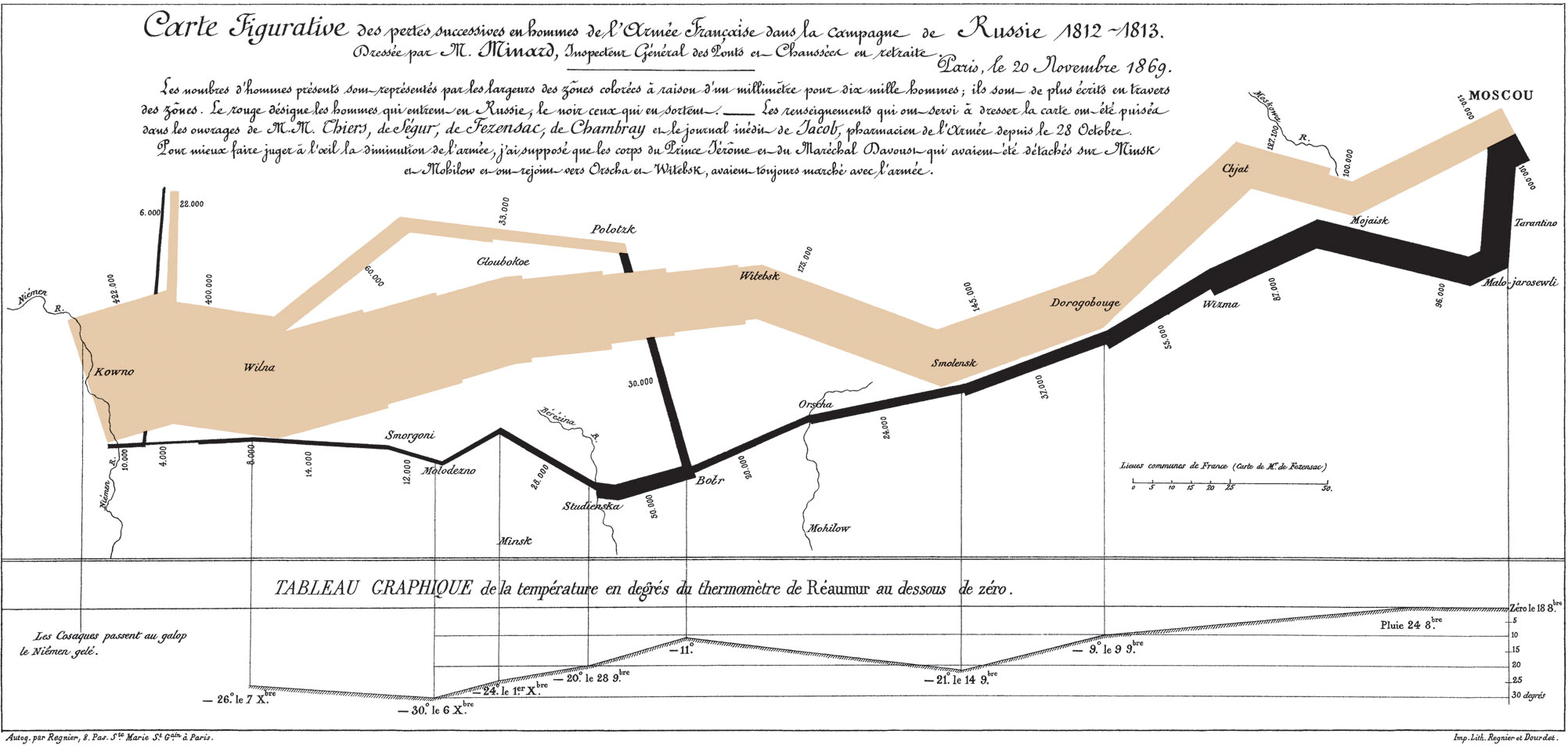
See Moscou on the map, see also Attrition warfare against Napoleon

The Council at Fili was a military council, which was convened on 13 September 1812 after the Battle of Borodino during the French invasion of Russia by Commander-in-Chief Mikhail Kutuzov in the village of Fili, west of Moscow. The question was asked whether, after the orderly retreat from the Battle of Borodino that Napoleon had won despite great losses of the Grande Armée, to give another battle near Moscow or to abandon the city without a fight.

== On the eve of the council ==
On the eve of the council, formations of the Russian Army were located west of Moscow to give battle to Napoleon's troops. The position had been chosen by General Leonty Bennigsen. Barclay de Tolly had inspected the battlefield on horseback and came to the conclusion that the position was fatal to the formations of the Russian army. The same conclusions after him came, having traveled to the location of the Russian troops, to Alexei Yermolov and Karl Wilhelm von Toll.

== Course of the council in Fili ==
The council was attended by generals Mikhail Barclay de Tolly, Leonty Bennigsen, who was delayed on the way, Dmitry Dokhturov, Aleksey Yermolov, Pyotr Konovnitsyn, Alexander Osterman-Tolstoy, Nikolay Raevsky, who was very late, (Note: When Raevsky arrived at the meeting, Ermolov briefly brought him up to date.) Karl Toll, Fedor Uvarov, and General Paisiy Kaysarov who was on duty that day. (Note: In some sources, among those present, Matvey Platov and Mikhail Miloradovich were mistakenly mentioned.) There was no protocol. The main sources of information about the council are the memoirs of Raevsky and Ermolov, as well as a letter from Nikolai Longinov to Semyon Vorontsov in London.

Bennigsen, who opened the meeting, formulated a dilemma – to give battle in an unfavorable position or to surrender the ancient capital to the enemy. Kutuzov corrected him that it was not about saving Moscow, but about saving the army, since you can count on victory only if the combat-ready army is preserved. Barclay de Tolly proposed retreating to the Vladimirsky Tract and further to Nizhny Novgorod, so that in the event of Napoleon's turn to Saint Petersburg, he would have time to block his path.

In his speech, Bennigsen announced that the retreat makes senseless the bloodshed of Borodino. The surrender of the sacred to the Russian city will undermine the fighting spirit of the soldiers. Great will be purely material losses from the ruin of noble estates. Despite the onset of darkness, he proposed to regroup and attack the Grande Armée without delay. Bennigsen's proposal was supported by Yermolov, Konovnitsyn, Uvarov and Dohturov.

The first to speak in the debate was Barclay de Tolly, who criticized the position near Moscow and suggested retreating: "Having saved Moscow, Russia is not saved from a cruel, ruinous war. But if we save the army, the hopes of the Fatherland are not yet destroyed, and the war... can continue with convenience: the prepared troops will have time to join in different places outside Moscow".

Osterman-Tolstoy, Raevsky and Tol spoke for the fact that Russia is not in Moscow. The latter pointed out that the army exhausted by the battle of Borodino was not ready for a new equally large-scale battle, especially since many commanders were disabled by wounds. At the same time, the army's retreat along the streets of Moscow will make a painful impression on the townspeople. To this Kutuzov objected that "the French army will dissolve in Moscow like a sponge in the water", and offered to retreat to the Ryazan road.

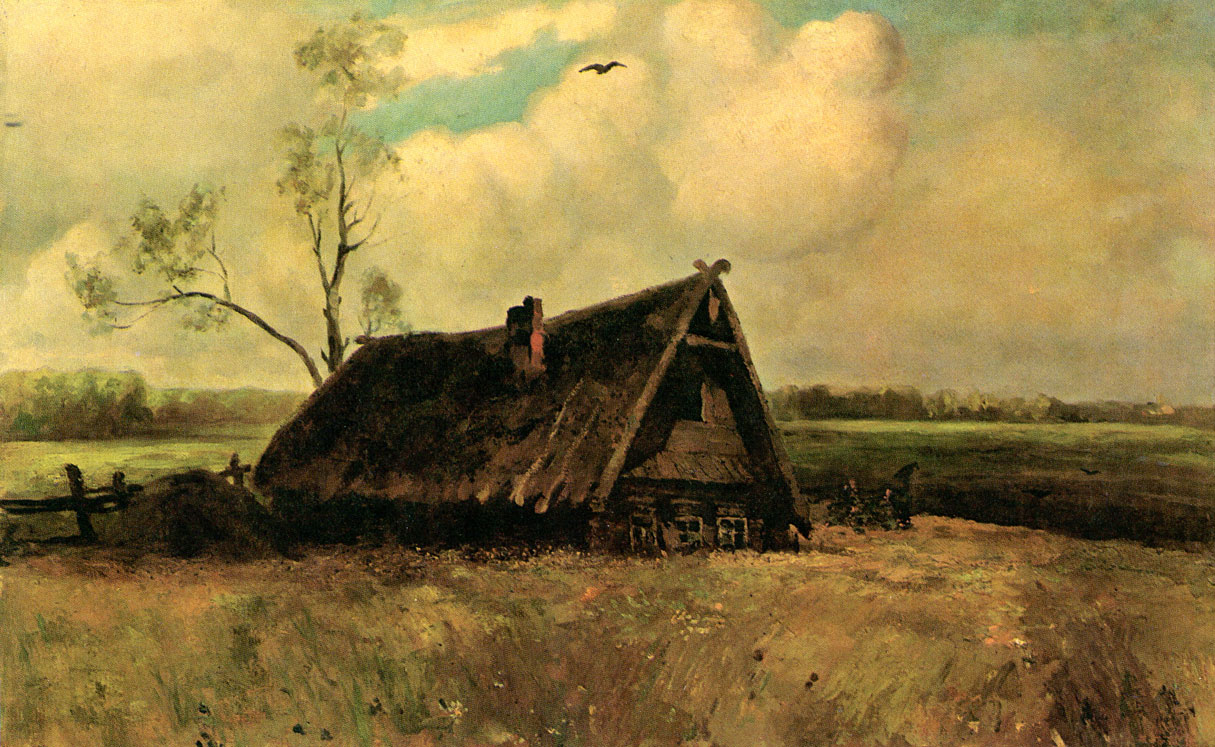
Savrasov's painting "House of Council at Fili"

Kutuzov, based on the minority opinion present, decided against engaging in battle from an unfavorable position and chose to abandon Moscow. He echoed Barclay de Tolly's sentiment that "with the loss of Moscow, Russia is still not lost" to preserve the army for ongoing warfare and to move closer to available reserves. This decision required significant courage due to the immense responsibility of surrendering the historical capital to the enemy, which could lead to his resignation as commander-in-chief. The reaction of the court to this decision was unpredictable.

== After the council in Fili ==
At the end of the council, Kutuzov summoned the quartermaster-general Dmitry Lanskoy and ordered him to ensure the supply of food on the Ryazan road. At night, the adjutant of Kutuzov heard him cry. The army, which was preparing for battle, was ordered to retreat, causing widespread bewilderment and grumbling. Retreat in the city was carried out at night. Authorities in Moscow, led by Count Fedor Rostopchin, were taken aback at the decision to retreat.

After two day crossings, the Russian army turned from the Ryazan road to Podolsk onto the old Kaluga road, and from there onto the new Kaluga one. As part of the Cossacks continued to retreat to Ryazan, the French scouts were disoriented, and Napoleon for 9 days had no idea about the whereabouts of the Russian troops.

== Memory of the council ==
The Council at Fili was described by Leo Tolstoy in the novel War and Peace. Based on the Tolstoy literary basis, the artist Alexei Kivshenko painted two paintings of the same content depicting the main characters on the 70th anniversary of the council, the first in 1880 (stored in the Russian Museum), the second in 1882 (Tretyakov Gallery).

In the tradition of Tolstoy and Kivshenko, the council is depicted in the epic of Sergei Bondarchuk "War and Peace" (1967). For reasons of economy of timing, among all the council members in the film, the word was given only to Kutuzov and Bennigsen (the latter speaks Russian on the movie screen, which he did not actually speak).

The hut of the peasant Mikhail Frolov (often mistakenly called Andrei Sevastyanovich Frolov or, following Leo Tolstoy, Andrei Sevastyanov), in which the council took place, burned down in 1868 but was restored in 1887. Since 1962, it is a branch of the Borodino Panorama Museum. The initial appearance of the hut is reliably known thanks to a number of studies carried out in the 1860s by Alexei Savrasov.

== See also ==
- Russian Army of 1812
