= Council of war =

Term in military science

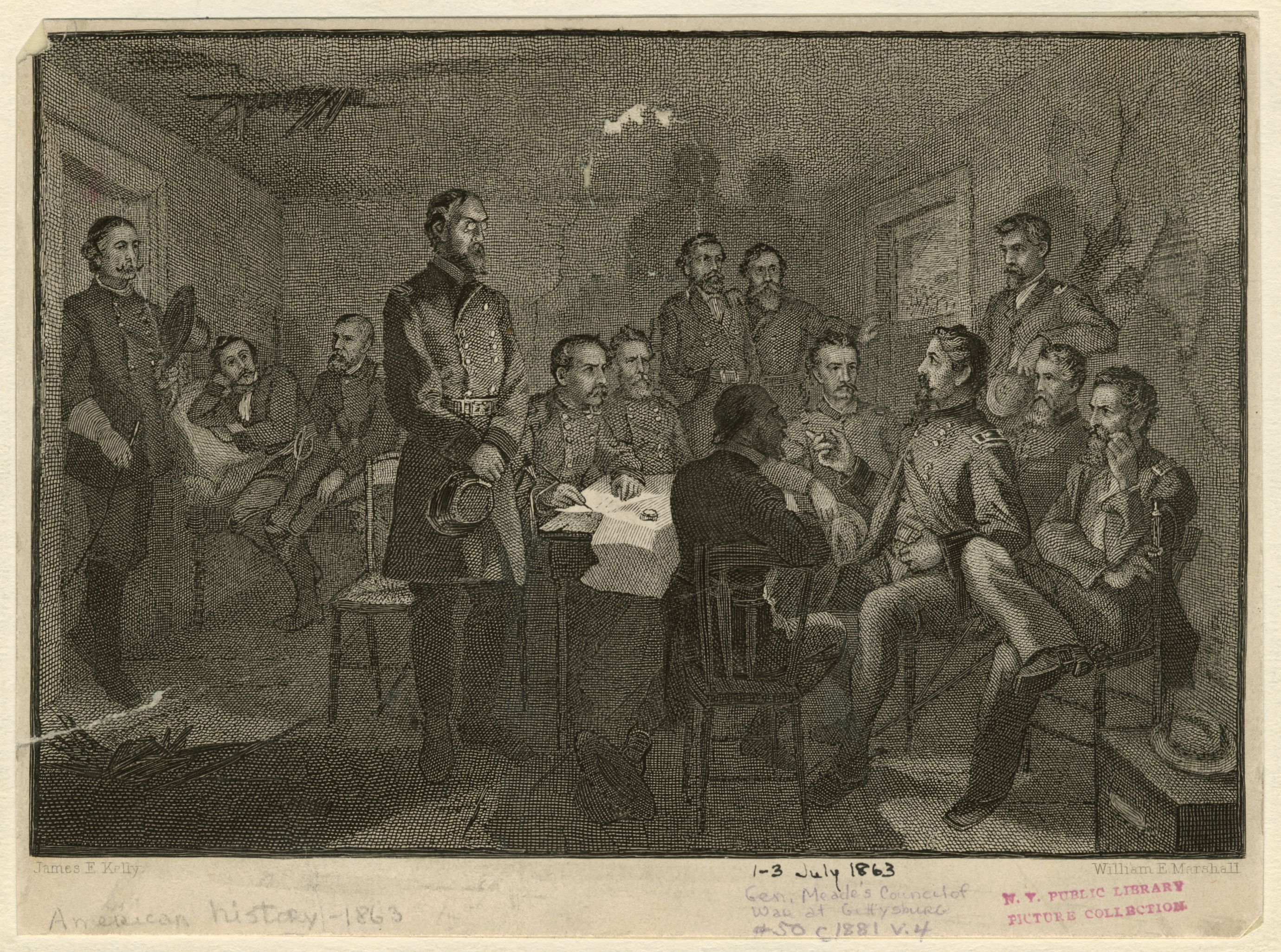
Engraving by James E. Kelly of George G. Meade and the council of war at Gettysburg, July 2, 1863

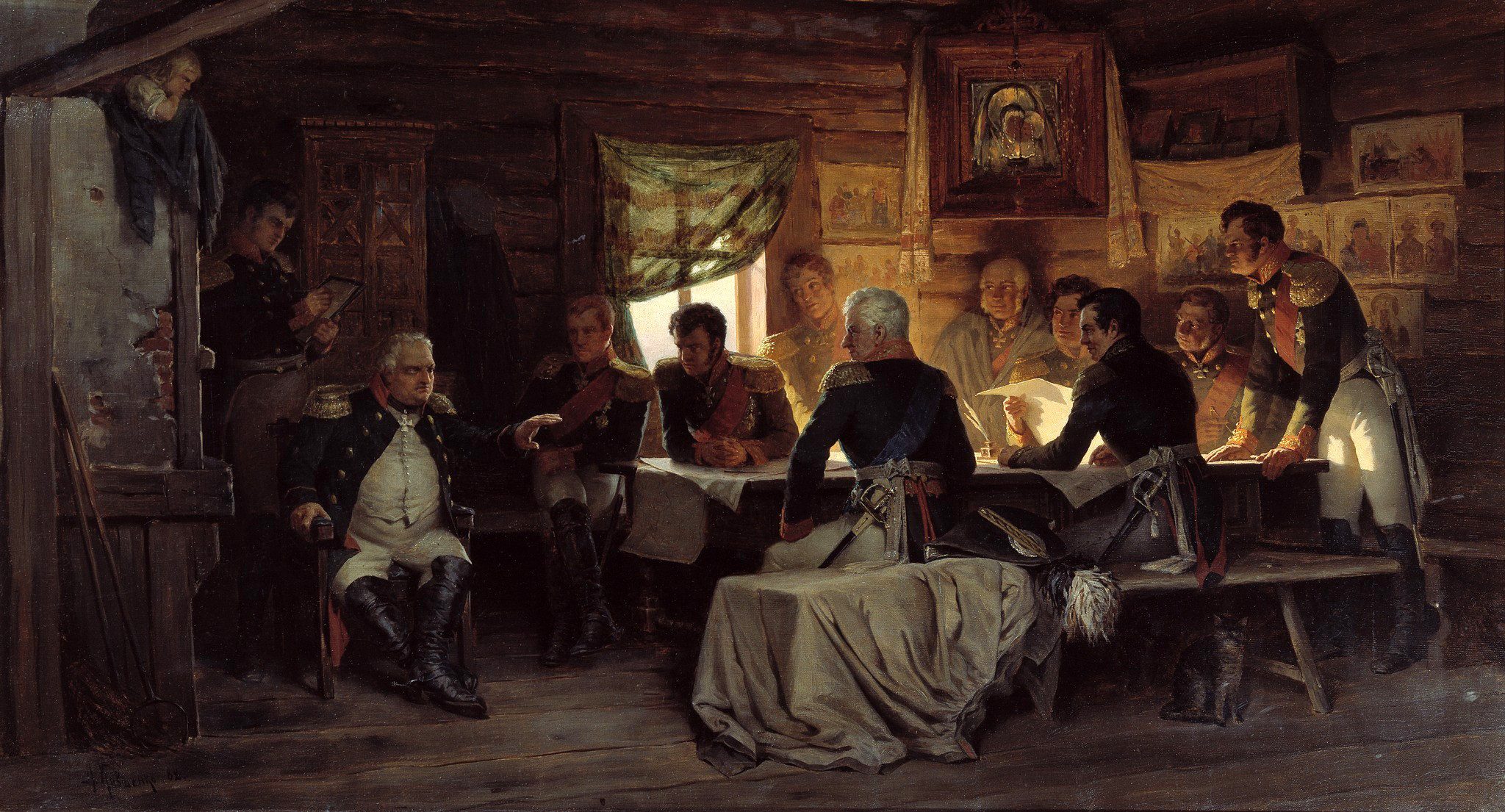
Aleksey Kivshenko. The Fili council of war decides to abandon Moscow to Napoleon.

A council of war is a term in military science that describes a meeting held to decide on a course of action, usually in the midst of a war. In normal circumstances, decisions are made by a commanding officer, optionally communicated and coordinated by staff officers, and then implemented by subordinate officers. Councils of war are typically held when matters of great importance must be decided, consensus must be reached with subordinates, or when the commanding officer is unsure of his position. The classic council of war includes a discussion and then a vote, often taken without the senior commander present to influence or intimidate the subordinates. The tradition in such meetings is that the officers vote in reverse sequence of their seniority, with the junior officers voting first.

In civilian usage, council of war can describe any important meeting, such as in business, that must reach a decision under the pressure of adverse conditions.

A variation on the traditional council of war is one in which the subordinates vote, but the results are considered merely advisory to the overall commander, who then makes a final decision. Such a meeting was held on July 2, 1863, during the Battle of Gettysburg, in which Major General George G. Meade, commanding the Union Army of the Potomac, convened his Corps commanders and staff to discuss whether they should withdraw from the battlefield or, if not, whether they should attack Robert E. Lee's Confederate army or await his attack. Historical evidence indicates that Meade had already determined to stay and await Lee's attack, which occurred on July 3, the disastrous attack known as Pickett's Charge. But Meade formed consensus in his staff and improved their confidence by encouraging a two-hour discussion and vote, which resulted in the outcome he was seeking.
