= Kozlovsky Uyezd =

Subdivision of the Tambov Governorate

Kozlovsky Uyezd (Козловский уезд) was one of the subdivisions of the Tambov Governorate of the Russian Empire. It was situated in the western part of the governorate. Its administrative centre was Kozlov (Michurinsk).

== Demographics ==
At the time of the Russian Empire Census of 1897, Kozlovsky Uyezd had a population of 337,603. Of these, 99.7% spoke Russian, 0.1% Polish, 0.1% Yiddish and 0.1% German as their native language.
