= Lebedyansky Uyezd =

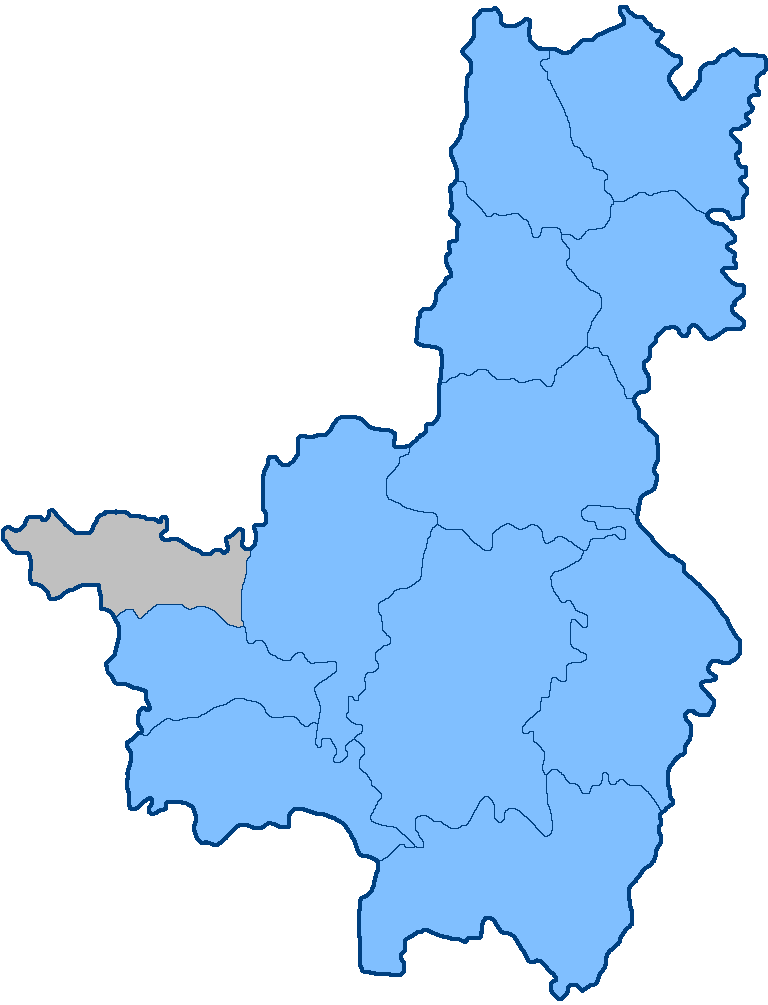
Lebedyansky district on the map of Tambov province

Lebedyansky Uyezd (Лебедянский уезд) was one of the subdivisions of the Tambov Governorate of the Russian Empire. It was situated in the western part of the governorate. Its administrative centre was Lebedyan.

== Demographics ==
At the time of the Russian Empire Census of 1897, Lebedyansky Uyezd had a population of 144,822. Of these, 99.9% spoke Russian as their native language.
