= Aleksey Kivshenko =

Russian painter (1851–1895)

- Алексей Кившенко
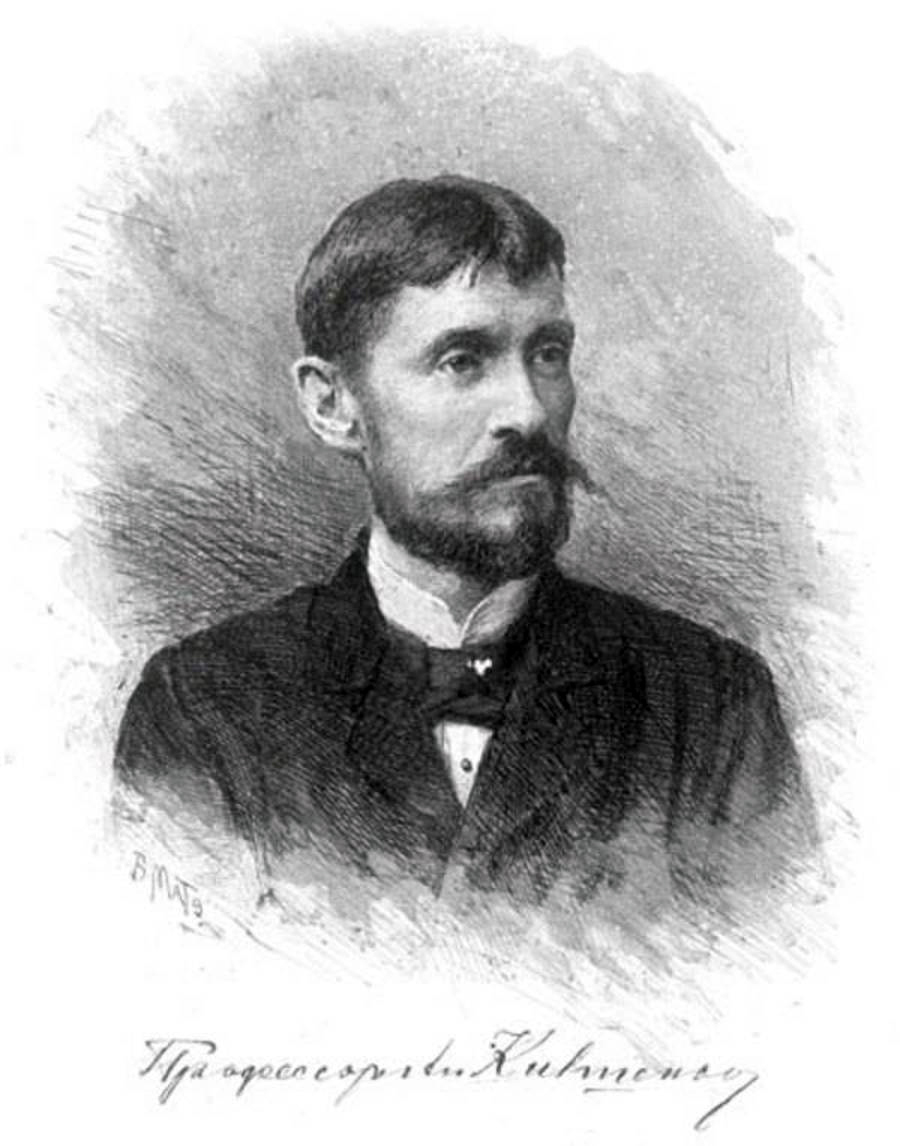
- Aleksey Kivshenko (1890s)
- Born: 22 March 1851; Venyov, Tula Governorate, Russian Empire
- Died: 2 October 1895 (aged 44); Heidelberg, Grand Duchy of Baden, German Empire
- Resting place: Smolensky Cemetery, Saint Petersburg
- Education: Member Academy of Arts (1884); Professor by rank (1893)
- Known for: Painting
- Movement: Peredvizhniki
- Awards: Big Gold Medal of the Imperial Academy of Arts (1877)

Aleksey Danilovich Kivshenko (Russian: Алексей Данилович Кившенко; 22 March [O.S. 10 March] 1851 – 2 October 1895) was a Russian painter, primarily of historical scenes. Among the best-known were those depicting the Russo-Turkish Wars. He also created hunting and genre scenes and was associated with the Peredvizhniki.

== Biography ==
He was born on a small stud farm in Tula Governorate in the family of a serf of Count Sheremetev. His father was interested in art and music, so he encouraged his son's early attempts at drawing. His first studies began when he was nine; at the Imperial Society for the Encouragement of the Arts with Ivan Kramskoi.

From 1867 to 1877, he was a student at the Imperial Academy of Arts, under the direction of Kārlis Hūns. He also audited classes at the State Institute of Technology and the Medico-Surgical Academy, but these were not to his liking. While there, he helped support himself by working as a scribe for the Admiralty Board.

During the late 1870s Kivshenko travelled to Ukraine, where his family stemmed from. The journey inspired him to create a series of paintings on the topic of common people's life, including scenes from the life of local Jews. The series was continued in 1882-1883 with paintings on the topics of Ukrainian folk culture and history, including a depiction of Taras Bulba and his sons.

In 1880, after receiving a foreign fellowship, he began to travel extensively, visiting Paris, Düsseldorf and Munich, where he worked with Gabriel von Max and Wilhelm von Diez. When he returned in 1884, the paintings he had produced earned him the title of "Academician". Later that year, he was commissioned by Tsar Alexander III to create scenes from the recent Russo-Turkish War, so he went to Transcaucasia to make sketches. He also taught drawing at the Saint Petersburg Art and Industry Academy until 1889.

In 1891, he accompanied Nikodim Kondakov on an archaeological expedition to Palestine and Syria, returning with numerous sketches of everyday life in the region, as well as the ancient buildings. Many of these were used as book decorations. In 1893, he became a full member of the Academy and taught a class in battle painting. He died of undisclosed causes during a visit to Germany.

== Selected paintings ==
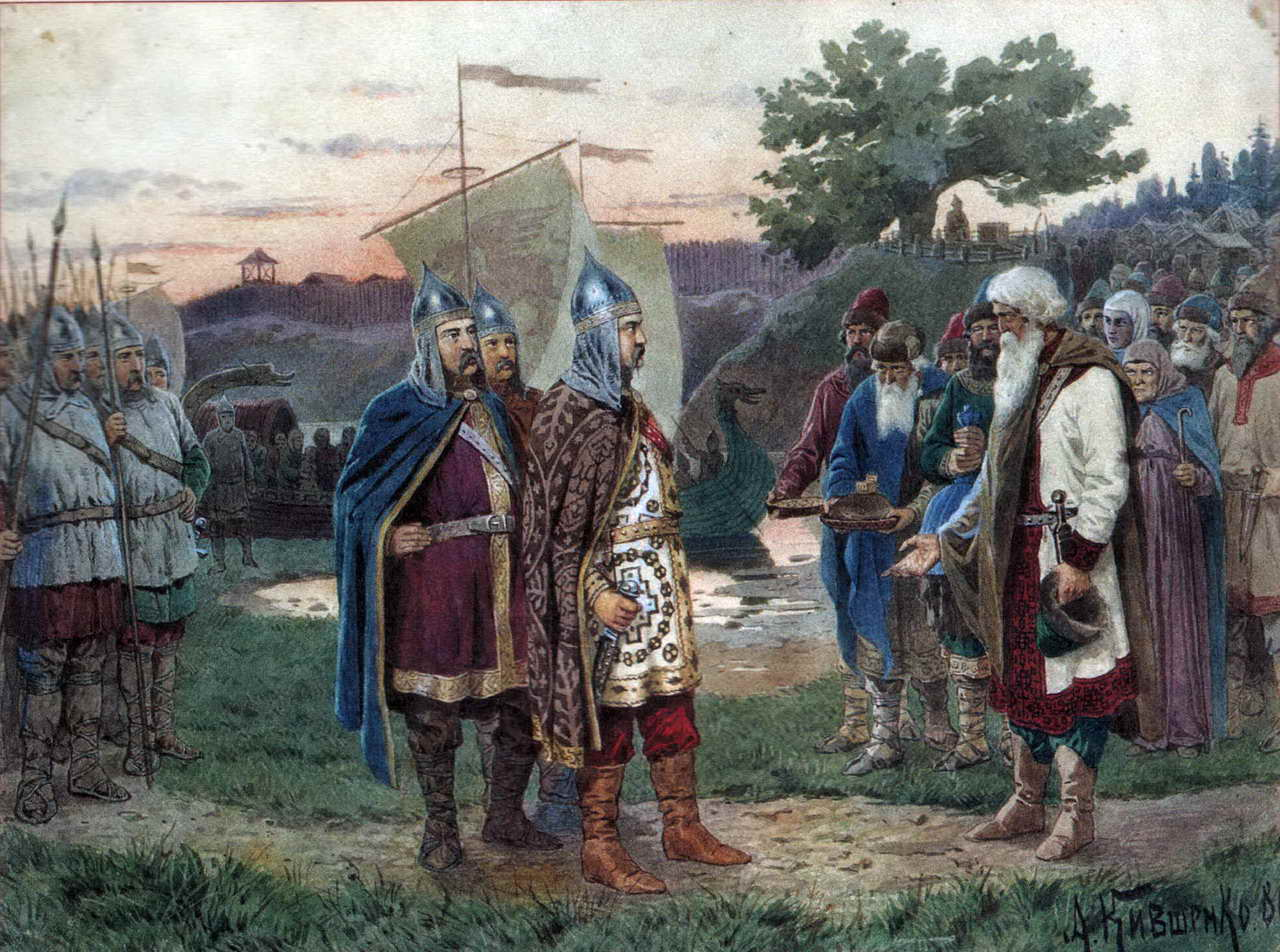
Calling of the Varangians

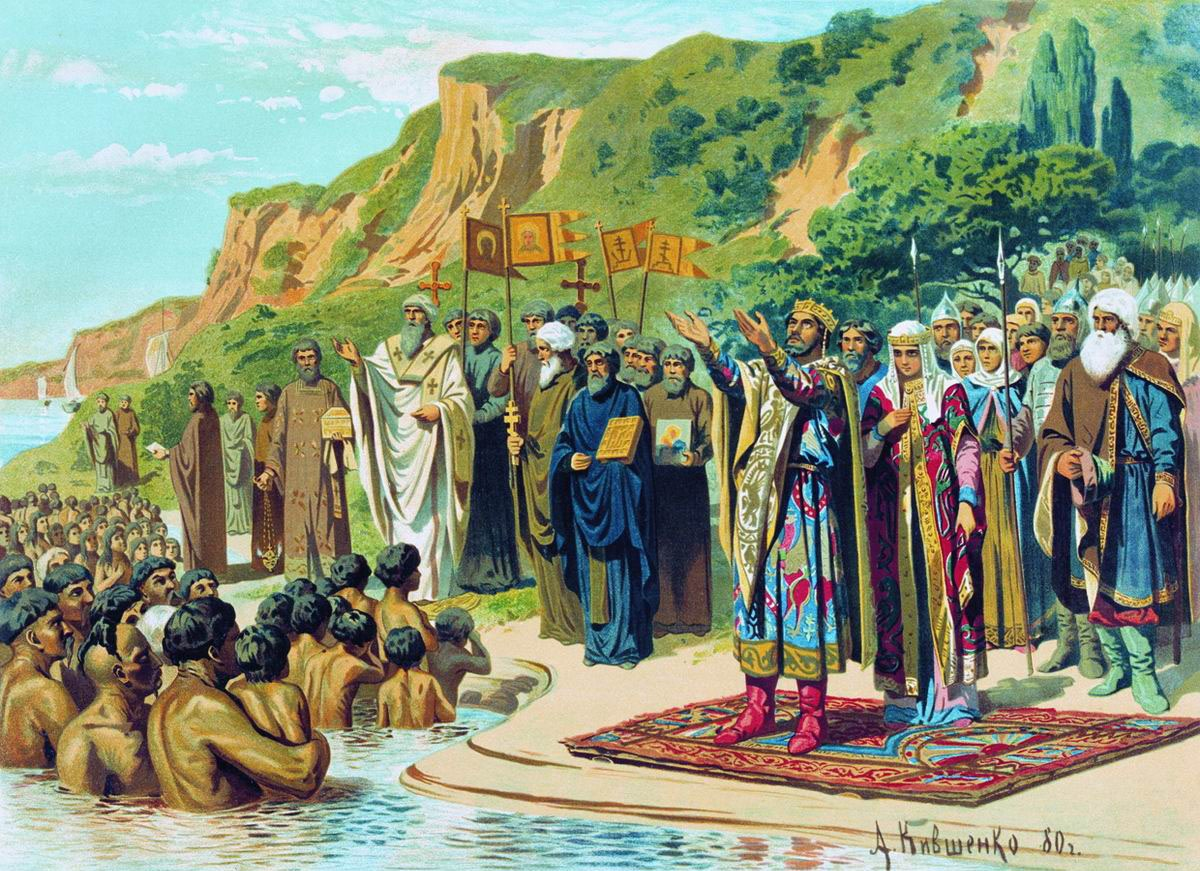
Baptism of Rus

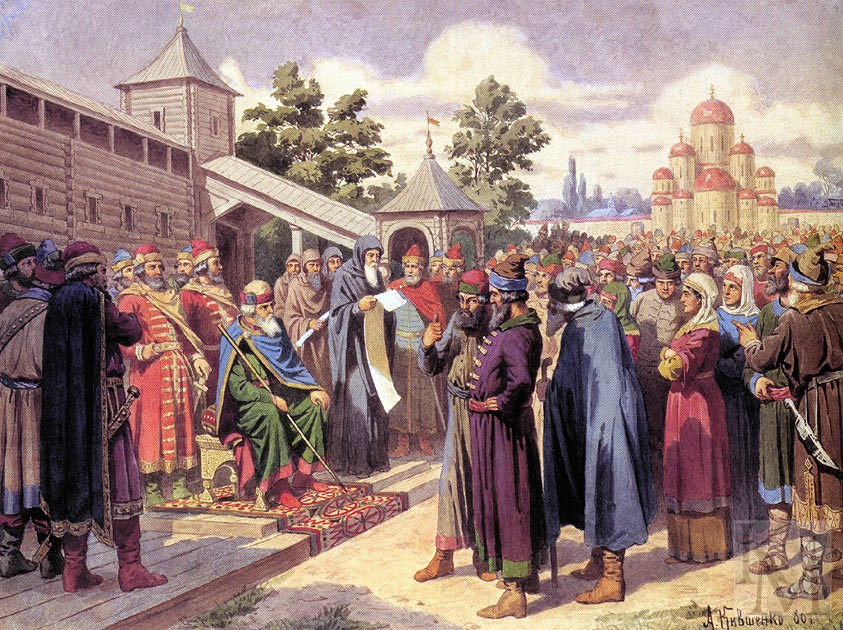
Reading of the Russkaya Pravda for the people in the presence of Grand Prince Yaroslav

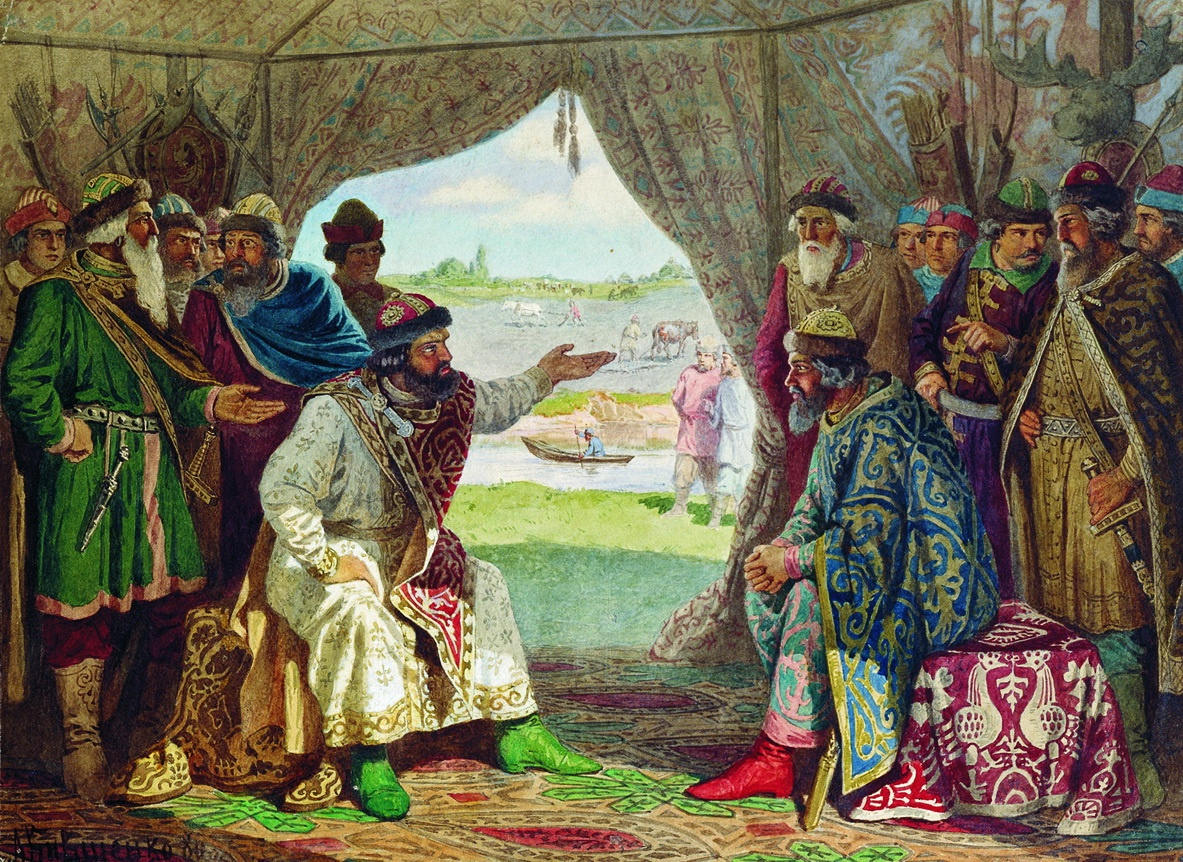
Dolobskoye Congress

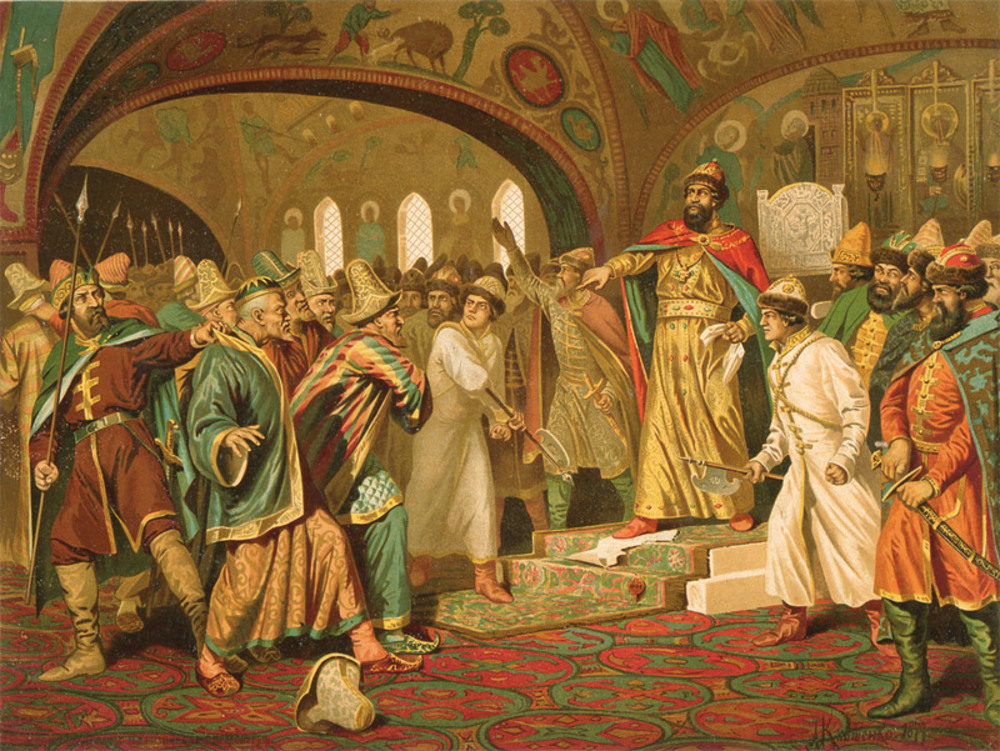
Ivan III tears up the Khan's charter

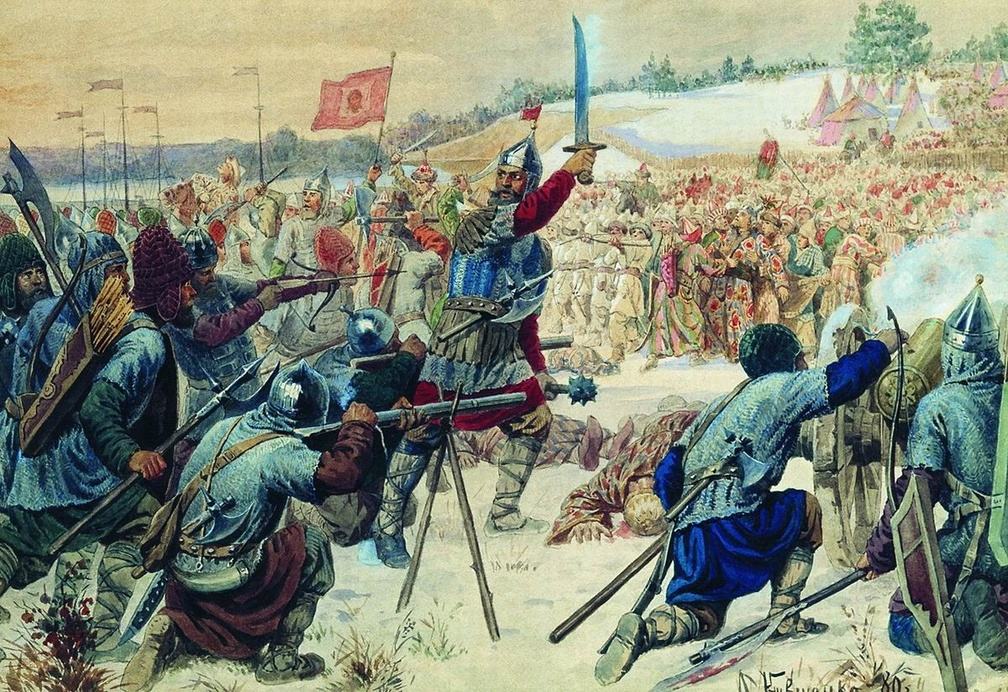
Conquest of the Khanate of Sibir

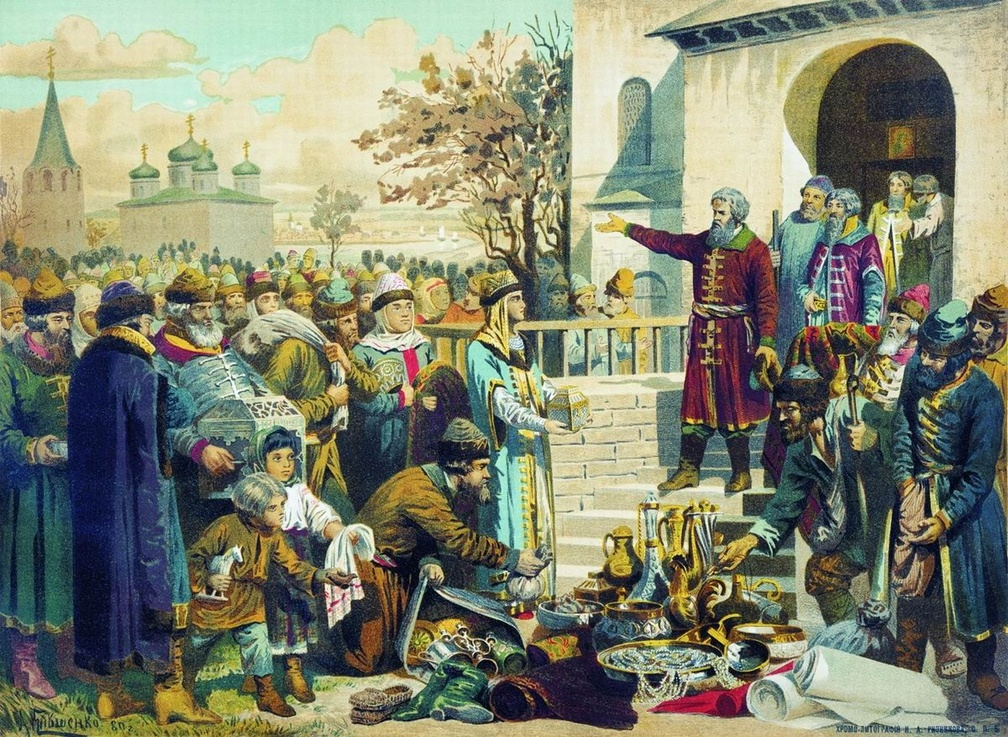
Minin's Proclamation to the Nizhegorodians

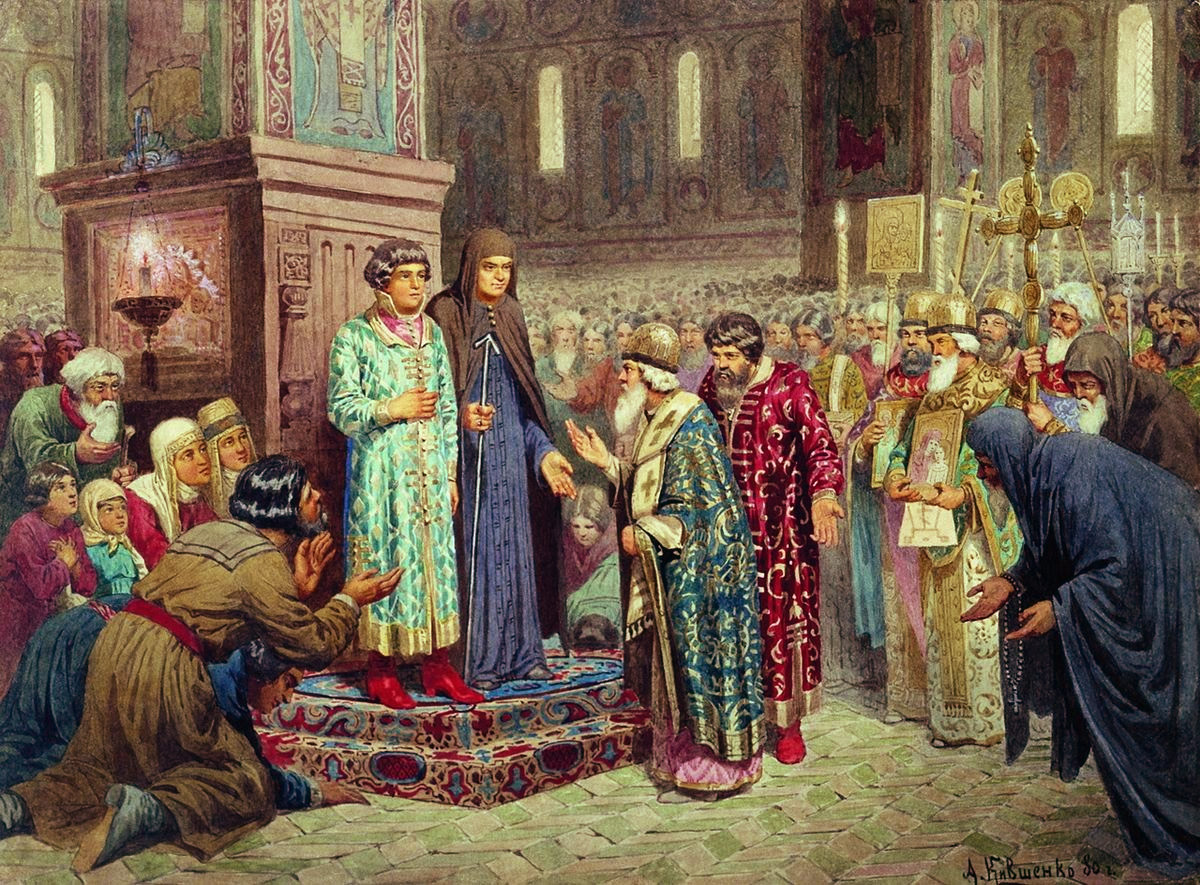
Election of Mikhail Fyodorovich Romanov to the Tsardom

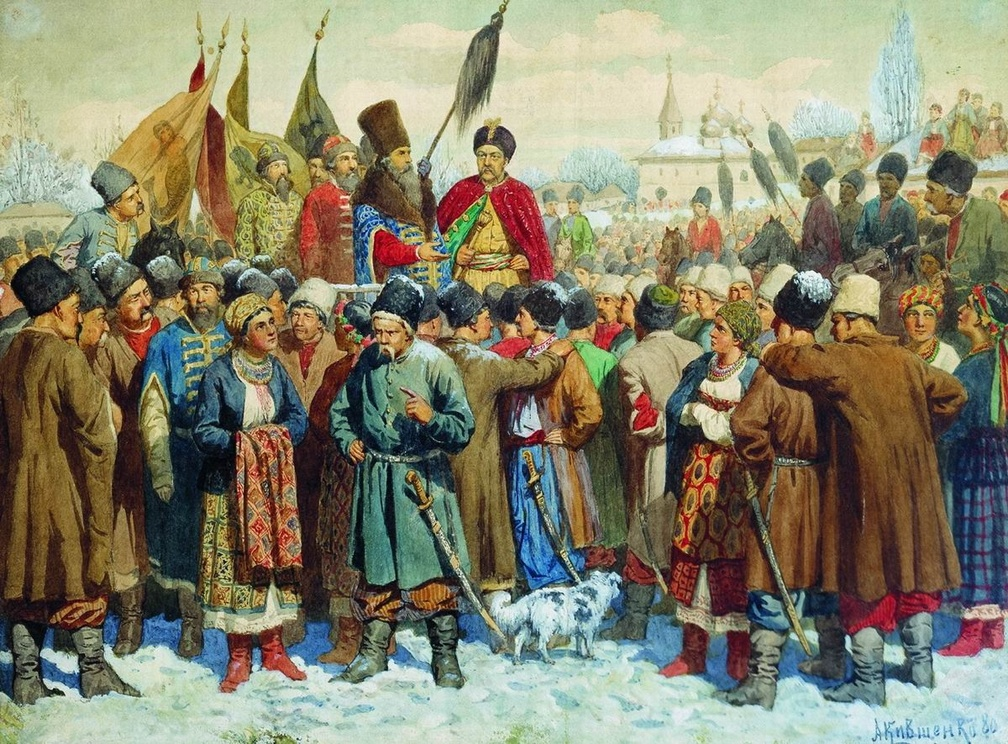
Pereiaslav Agreement

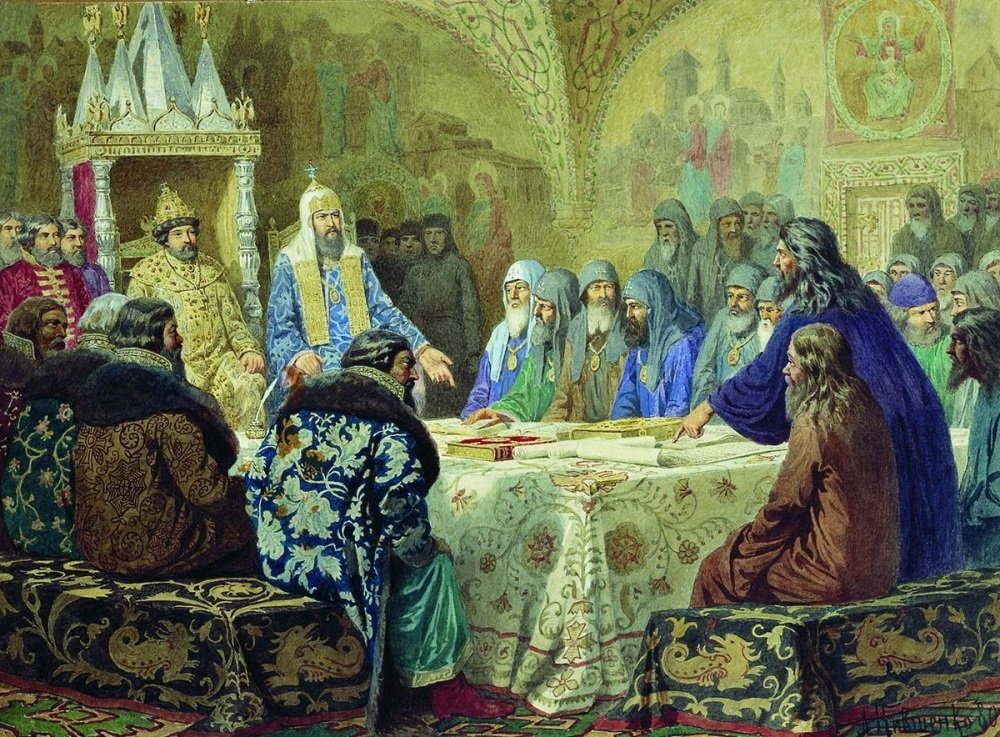
Patriarch Nikon Revising the Service-Books

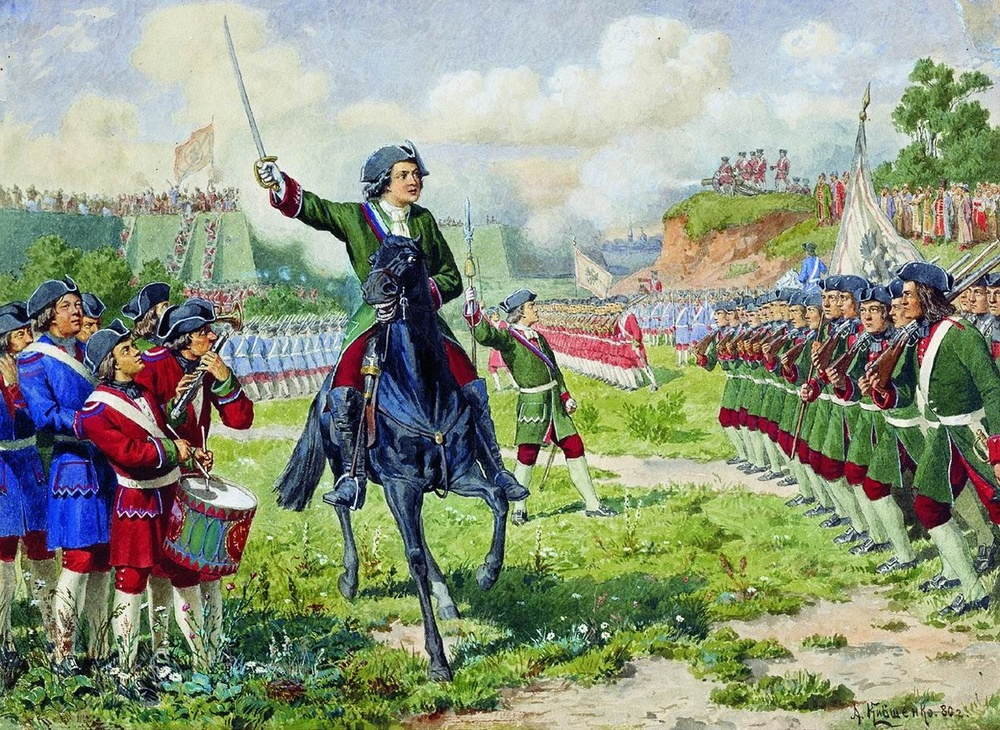
Toy army of Peter the Great

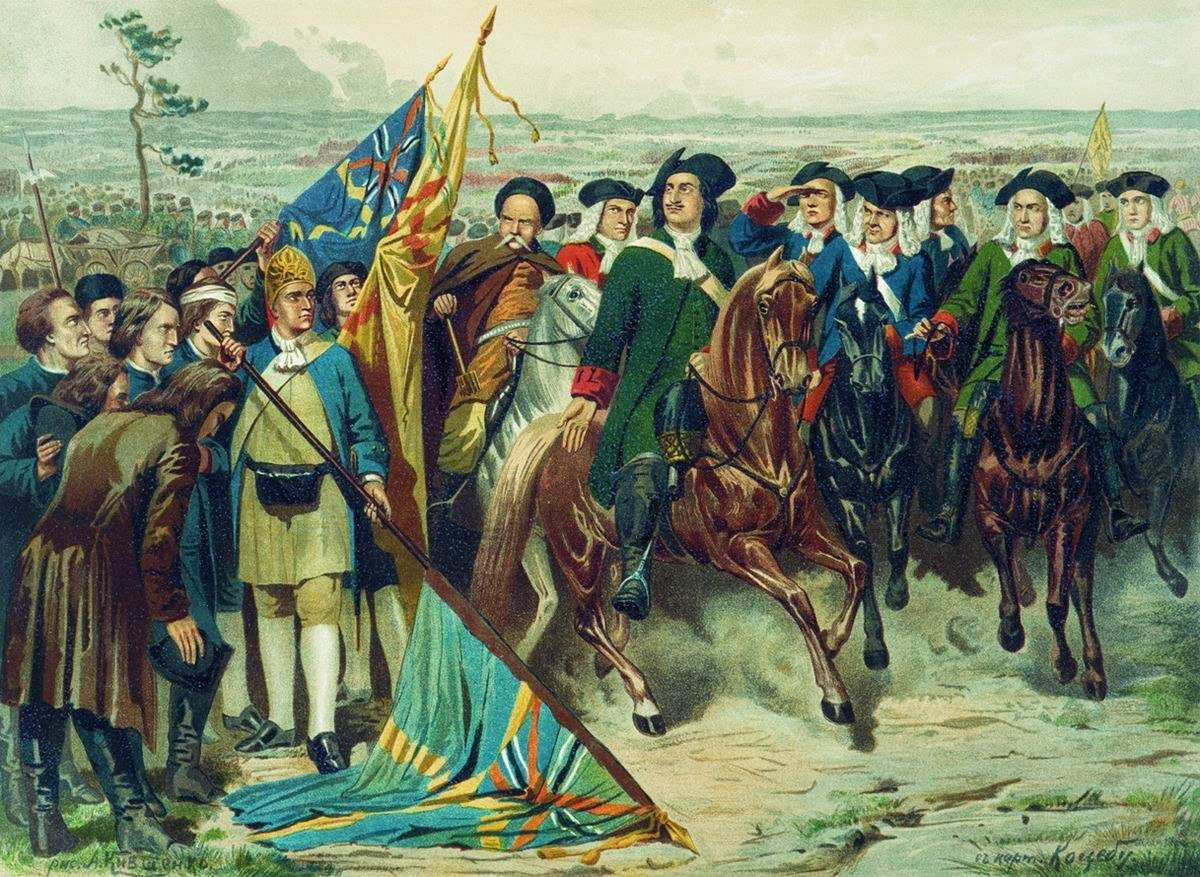
Battle of Poltava

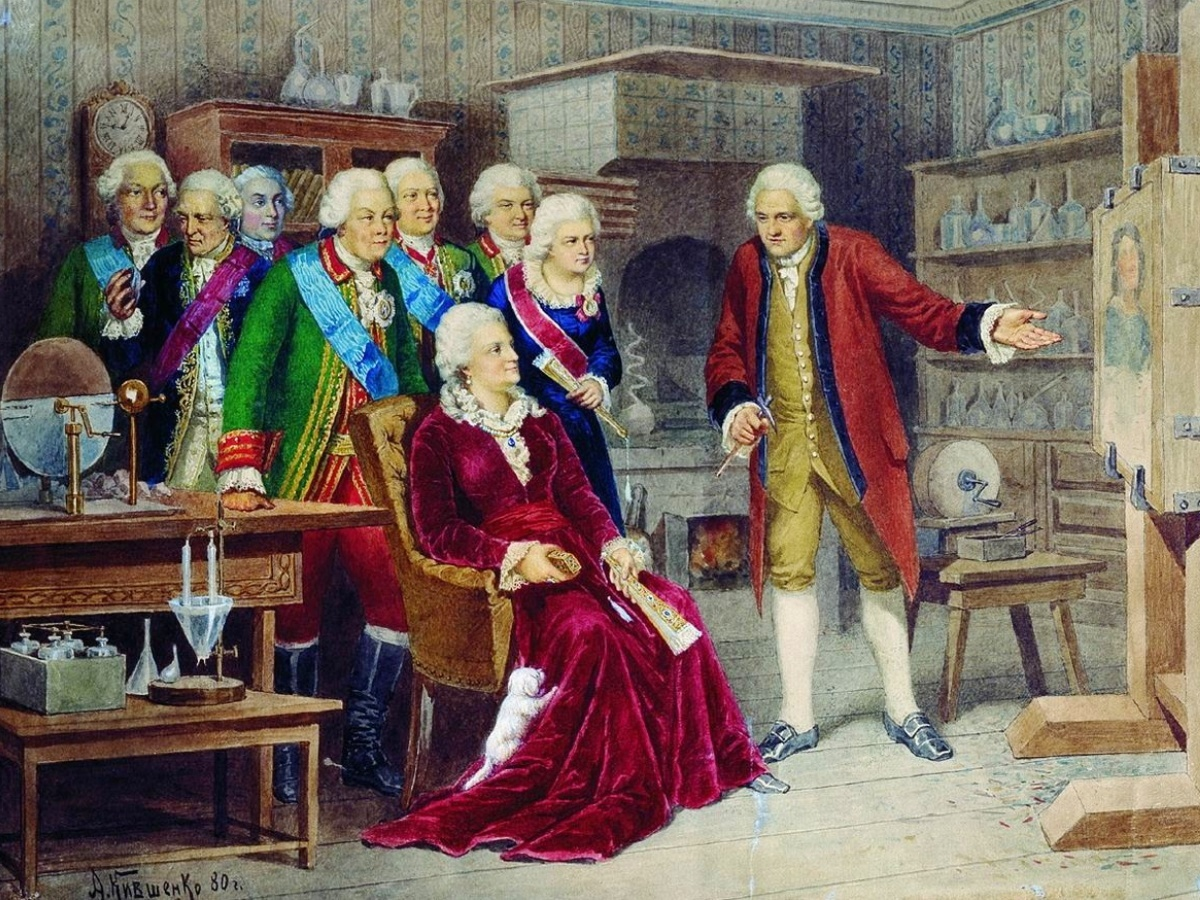
Lomonosov and Catherine II

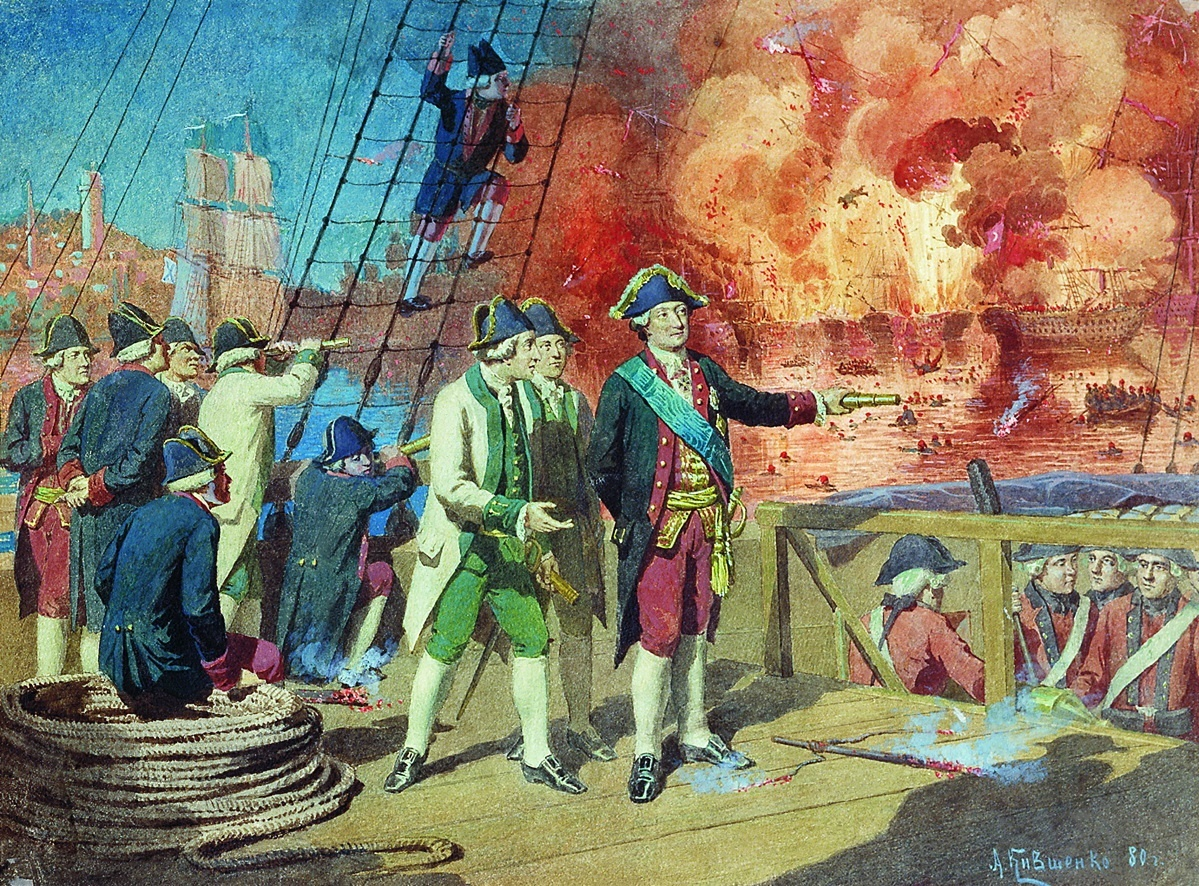
Battle of Chesma

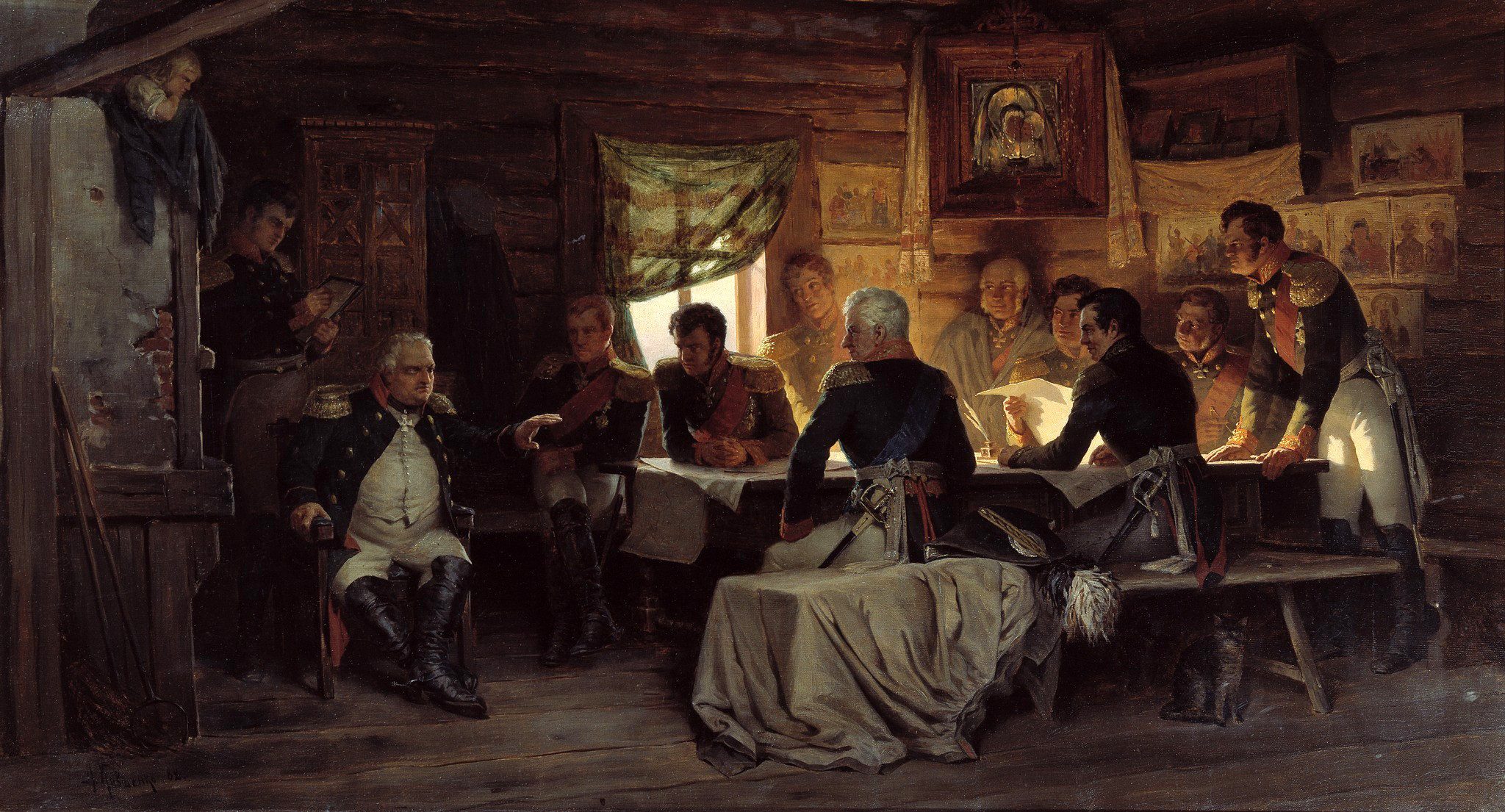
General Kutuzov at the Council of Fili; his best known work. The other participants are identified on the file in Wikimedia Commons

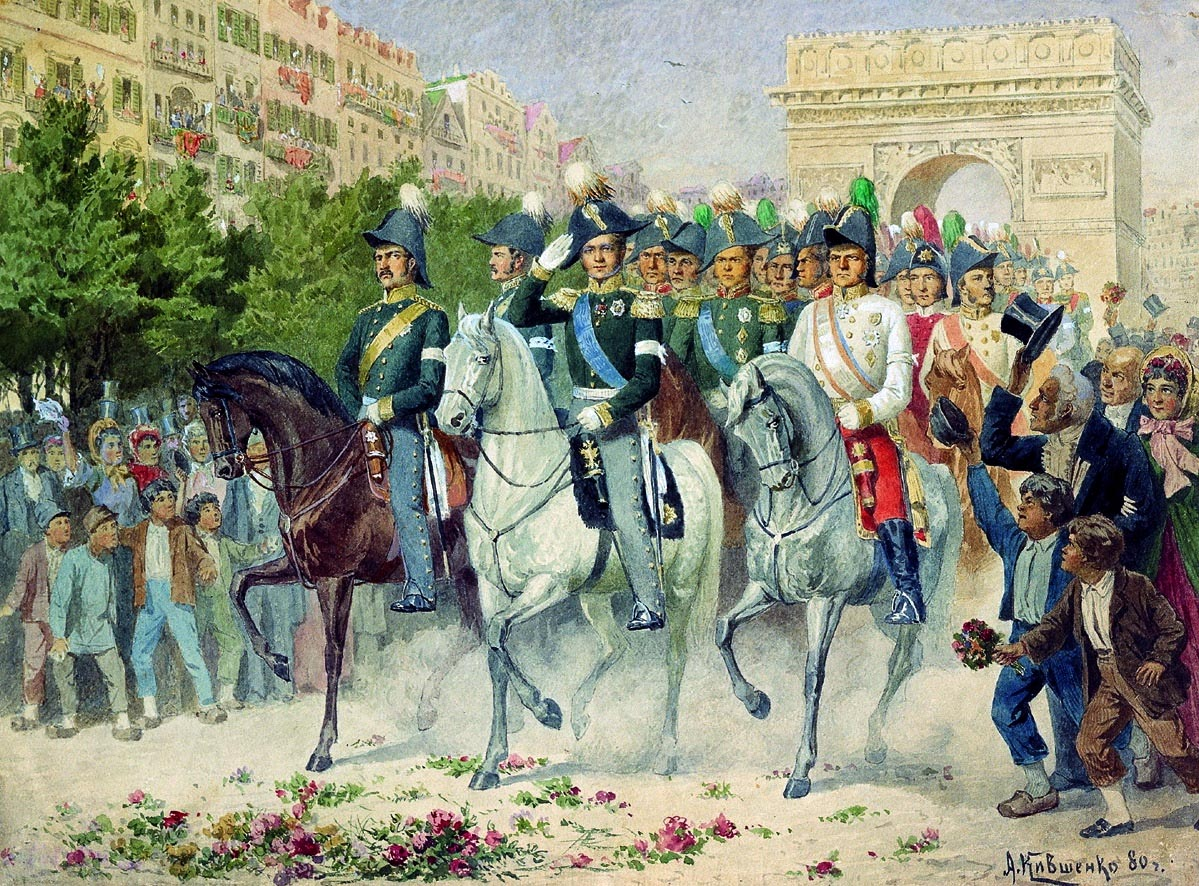
The entry into Paris in 1814 (aftermath of Battle of Paris (1814))

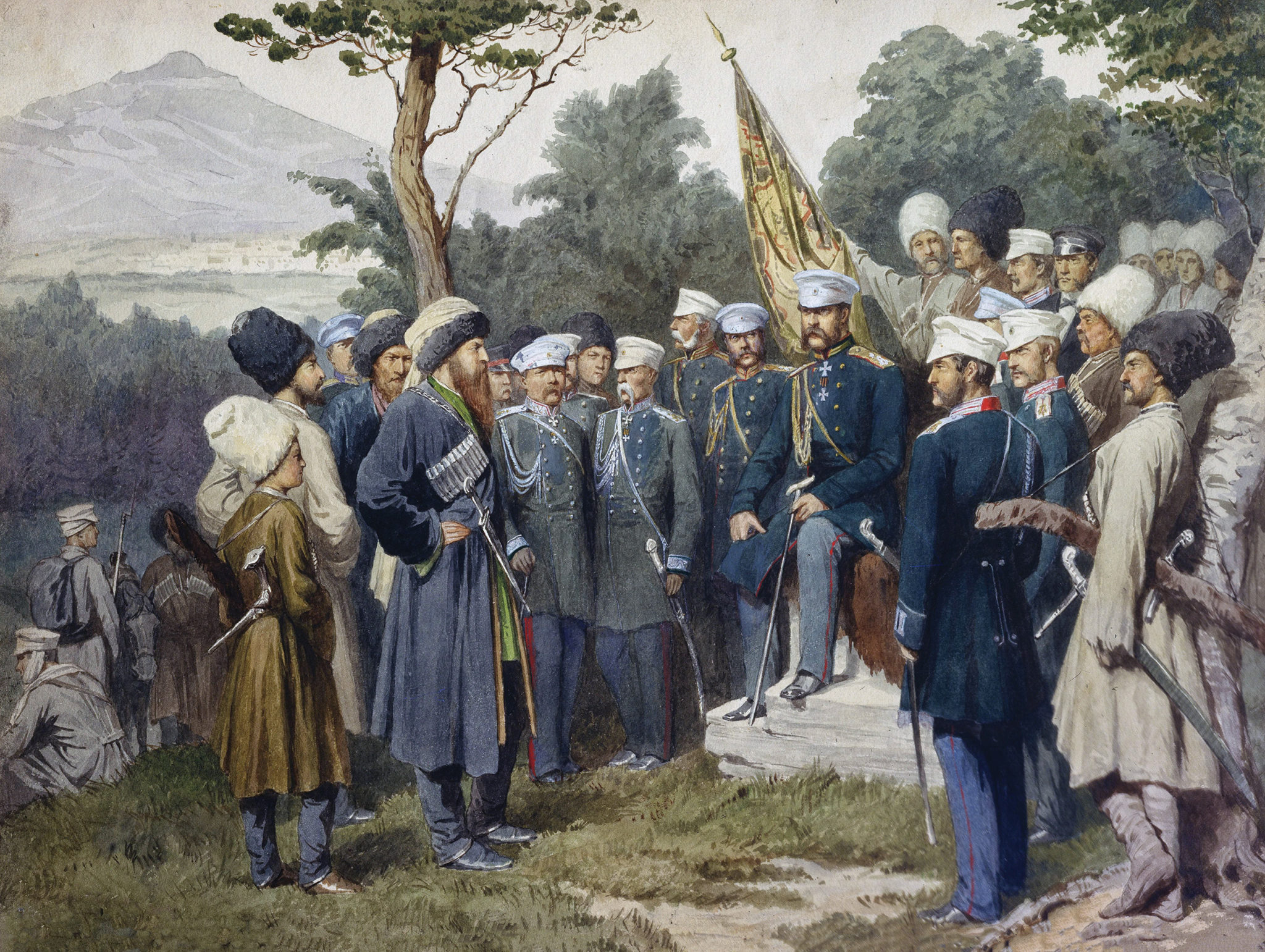
Imam Shamil Surrendering to Count Baryatinsky

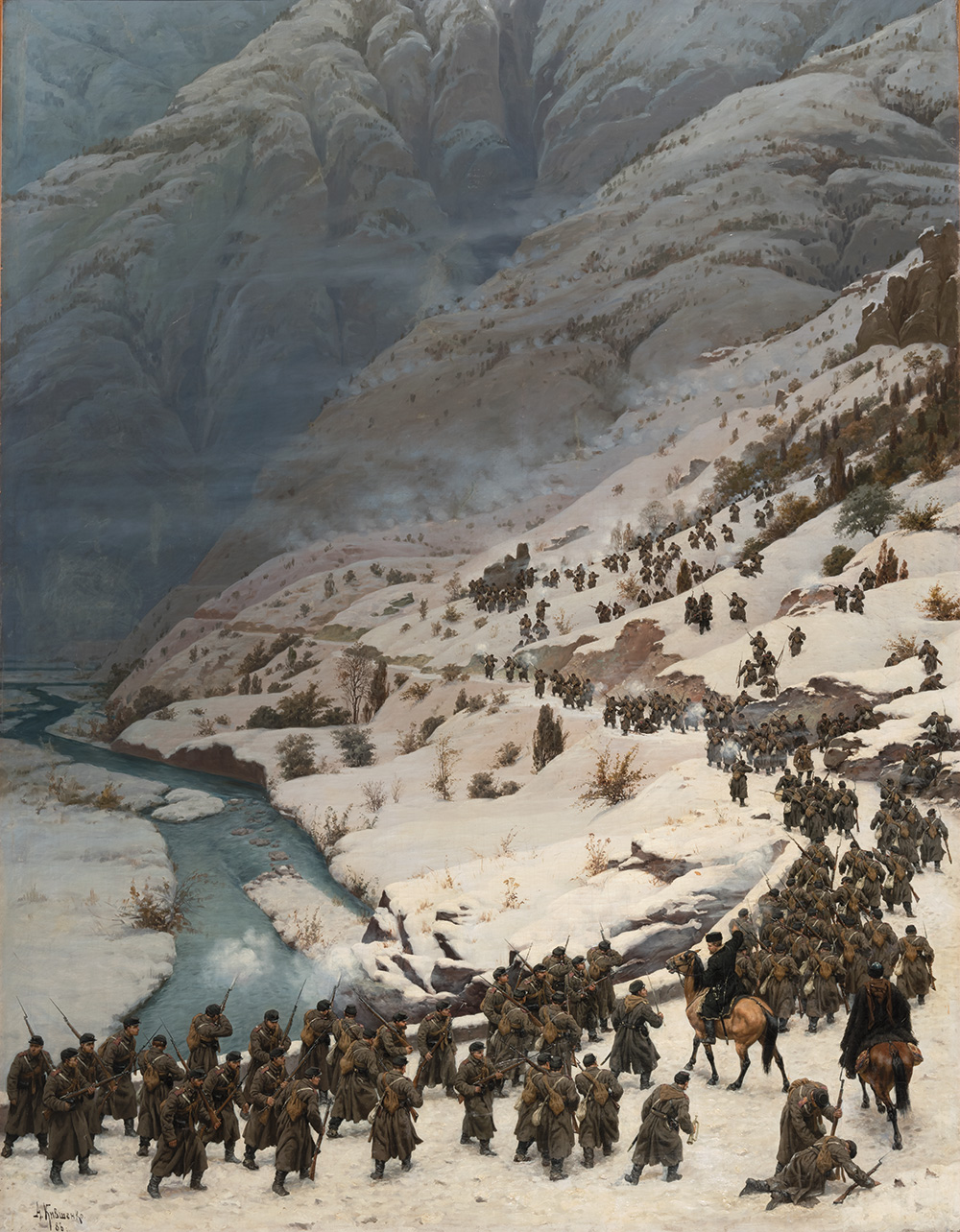
Storm of Gorgokhotany Heights

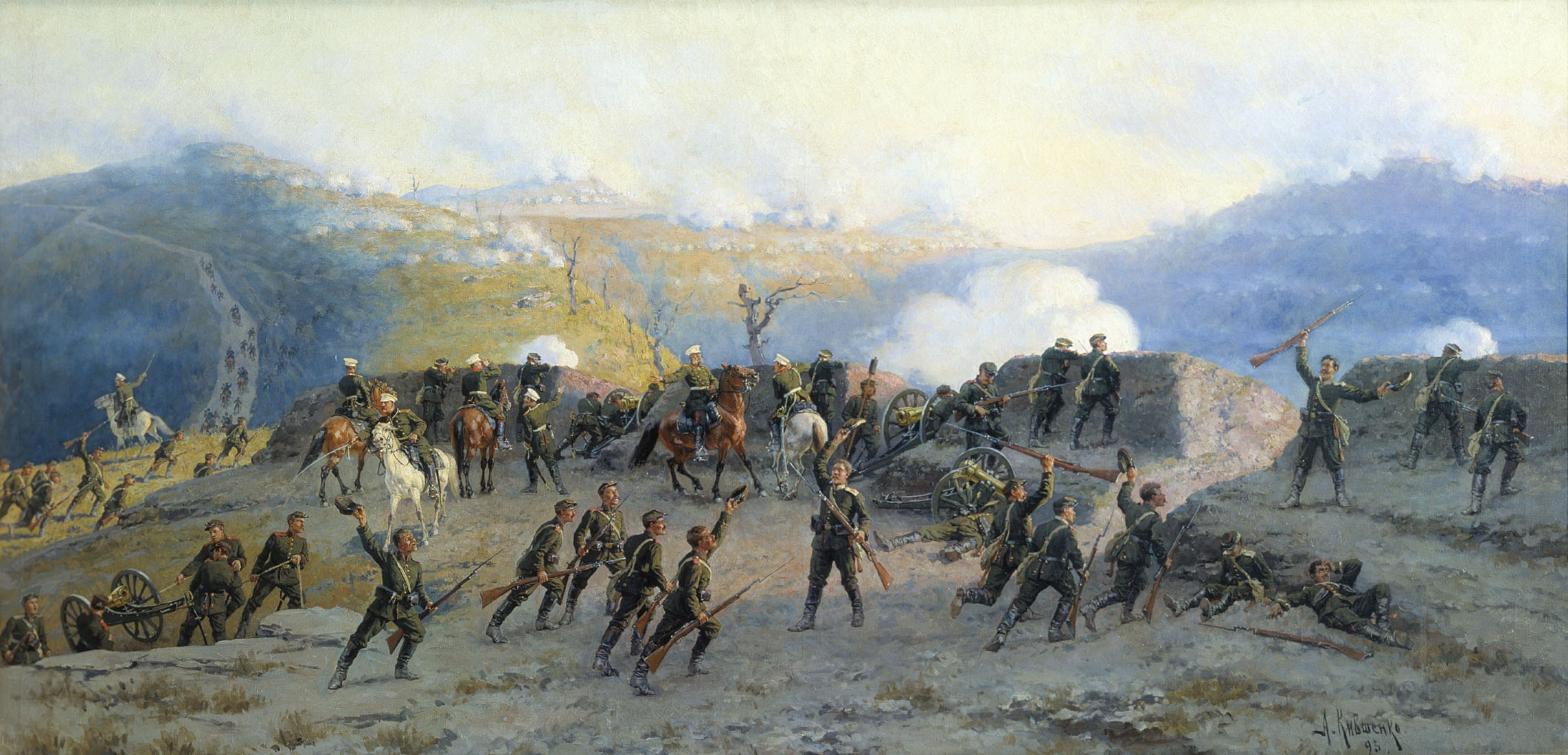
Battle on Shipka
