= Shatsky Uyezd =

Shatsky Uyezd (Ша́цкий уе́зд) was one of the subdivisions of the Tambov Governorate of the Russian Empire. It was situated in the northern part of the governorate. Its administrative centre was Shatsk.

== Demographics ==
At the time of the Russian Empire Census of 1897, Shatsky Uyezd had a population of 163,895. Of these, 99.1% spoke Russian, 0.6% Tatar and 0.1% Mordvin as their native language.
