= Spassky District, Penza Oblast =

Spassky District Спасский район (Russian)
- District
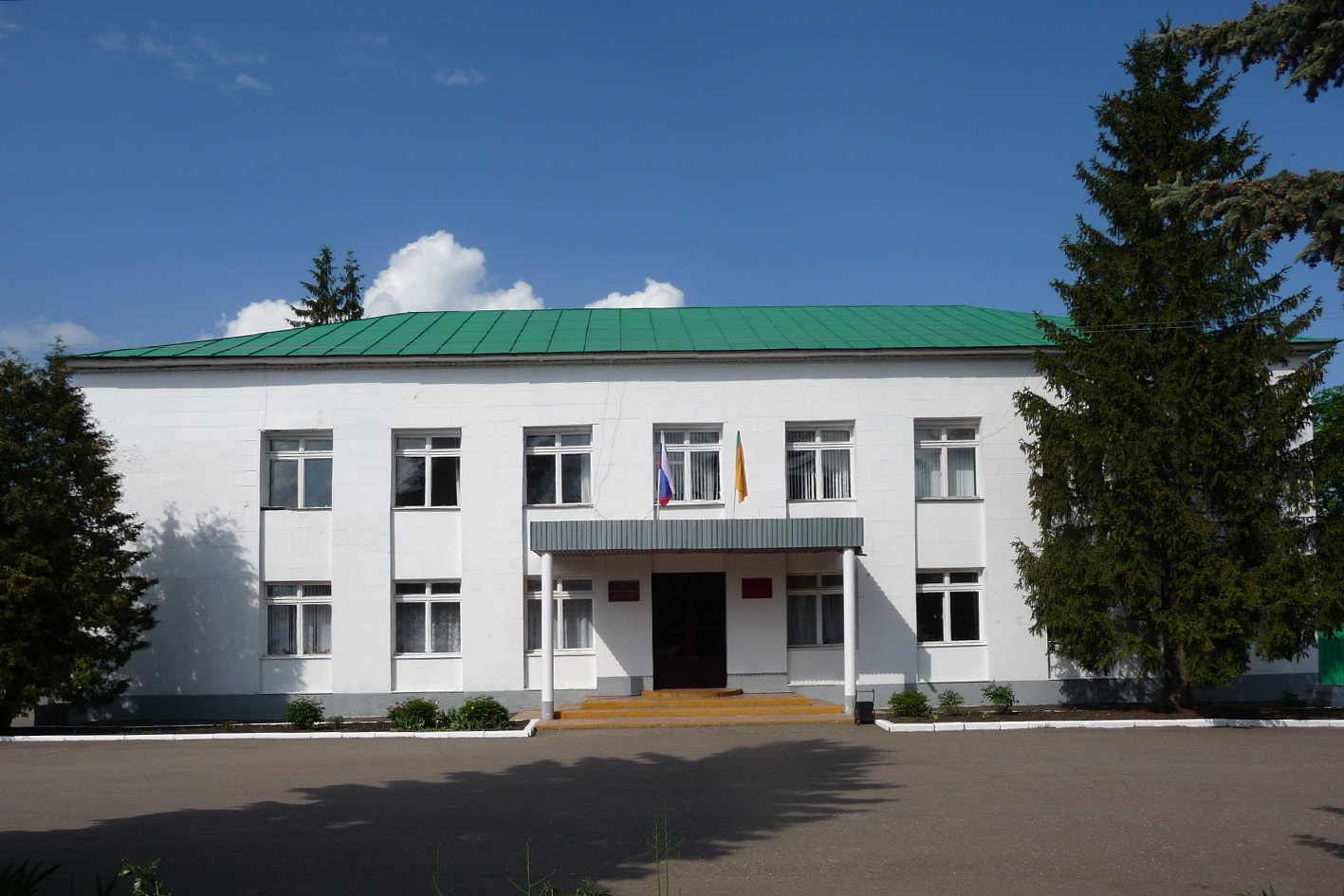
- Spassky District Administration building

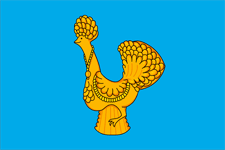
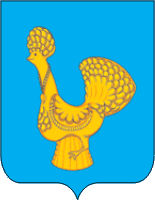
- Flag Coat of arms
- Location of Spassky District in Penza Oblast
- Coordinates: 53°56′N 43°11′E
- Country: Russia
- Federal subject: Penza Oblast
- Established: 16 July 1928
- Administrative center: Spassk

Area
  - Total: 693.3 km^{2} (267.7 sq mi)

Population (2010 Census)
  - Total: 13,008
  - Density: 18.76/km^{2} (48.59/sq mi)
  - Urban: 57.2%
  - Rural: 42.8%

Administrative structure
  - Administrative divisions: 1 Towns of district significance, 9 Selsoviets
  - Inhabited localities: 1 cities/towns, 24 rural localities

Municipal structure
  - Municipally incorporated as: Spassky Municipal District
  - Municipal divisions: 1 urban settlements, 9 rural settlements
- Time zone: UTC+3 (MSK)
- OKTMO ID: 56606000
- Website: http://rspas.pnzreg.ru/

Spassky District (Russian: Спа́сский райо́н) is an administrative and municipal district (raion), one of the twenty-seven in Penza Oblast, Russia. It is located in the northwest of the oblast. The area of the district is 693.3 square kilometers (267.7 sq mi). Its administrative center is the town of Spassk. Population: 13,008 (2010 Census); 13,827 (2002 census); 15,475 (1989 Soviet census). The population of Spassk accounts for 57.2% of the district's total population.

== History ==
Until March 14, 2006, the district was called Bednodemyanovsky (Беднодемьяновский).

== Notable residents ==
- Viktor Rodin (1928–2011), Soviet Strategic Missile Forces colonel general, born in the village of Dubrovka
