= Morshansky Uyezd =

Morshansky Uyezd (Моршанский уезд) was one of the subdivisions of the Tambov Governorate of the Russian Empire. It was situated in the central part of the governorate. Its administrative centre was Morshansk.

== Demographics ==
At the time of the Russian Empire Census of 1897, Morshansky Uyezd had a population of 270,392. Of these, 99.5% spoke Russian, 0.1% Polish, 0.1% Yiddish, 0.1% German and 0.1% Ukrainian as their native language.
