= Viktor Rodin =

Viktor Semyonovich Rodin
- Rodin, c. 1980s
- Native name: Виктор Семёнович Родин
- Born: 19 November 1928; Dubrovka village, Bednodemyanovsky District, Penza Oblast, RSFSR, Soviet Union
- Died: 17 September 2011 (aged 82) Moscow, Russia
- Buried: Troyekurovskoye Cemetery
- Allegiance: Soviet Union
- Branch: Strategic Missile Forces
- Service years: 1949–1991
- Rank: Colonel general
- Commands: Strategic Missile Forces Political Directorate
- Conflicts: Soviet–Afghan War
- Awards: Order of the October Revolution; Order of the Red Banner; Order of the Red Star (2); Order for Service to the Homeland in the Armed Forces of the USSR, 2nd class; Order for Service to the Homeland in the Armed Forces of the USSR, 3rd class

Viktor Semyonovich Rodin (Russian: Виктор Семёнович Родин; 19 November 1928 – 17 September 2011) was a Soviet Strategic Missile Forces colonel general. Rodin was the head of the Strategic Missile Forces Political Directorate between 1985 and 1992 and also a Candidate Member of the Central Committee of the Communist Party of the Soviet Union between 1986 and 1990.

== Early life ==
Rodin was born on 19 November 1928 to a peasant family in the village of Dubrovka in Penza Oblast. After graduating from seventh grade, he enrolled in the Bednodemyanovsky College of Agricultural Mechanization. He became a Komsomol member in January 1944. In 1947 he became secretary of the local Komsomol District Committee.

== Military service ==
In 1949, Rodin was drafted into the Soviet Army. He became Komsomol committee secretary of a military base in 1951. In 1954, he graduated from the Leningrad Military-Political School. He became political officer of a motor rifle regiment with the rank of captain. Rodin graduated from Distance Education courses at the Military-Political School in 1964. After the end of the courses he became deputy political officer of a motor rifle division. In 1966 he became the political officer of the division. In 1967, Rodin was awarded a first Order of the Red Star. In 1969, he graduated from the Military Academy of the General Staff. In 1975, he was awarded the Order for Service to the Homeland in the Armed Forces of the USSR 3rd class. Rodin was head of the Political Directorate of the Turkestan Military District, Kiev Military District and the South-Western Theatre of Military Operations (TVD). In 1979, he was awarded a second Order of the Red Star. Rodin received the Order of the Red Banner in 1980. He served with the 40th Army in the Soviet–Afghan War. In 1982 he was promoted to colonel general. On 14 December 1985 he became head of the Political Directorate of the Strategic Missile Forces. He was awarded the Order of the October Revolution. In 1990, Rodin was awarded the Order for Service to the Homeland in the Armed Forces of the USSR 3rd class. In November 1991 he transferred to the reserve.

== Later life ==
Rodin lived in Moscow. He died on 17 September 2011 and was buried in the Troyekurovskoye Cemetery.

== Personal life ==
Rodin married Nadezhda Semyonovna and had two daughters.
