= Usmansky Uyezd =

Usmansky Uyezd (Усманский уезд) was one of the subdivisions of the Tambov Governorate of the Russian Empire. It was situated in the southwestern part of the governorate. Its administrative centre was Usman.

== Demographics ==
At the time of the Russian Empire Census of 1897, Usmansky Uyezd had a population of 209,910. Of these, 99.8% spoke Russian and 0.1% Yiddish as their native language.
