= Spassk, Penza Oblast =

Town in Penza Oblast, Russia

Spassk Спасск
- Town
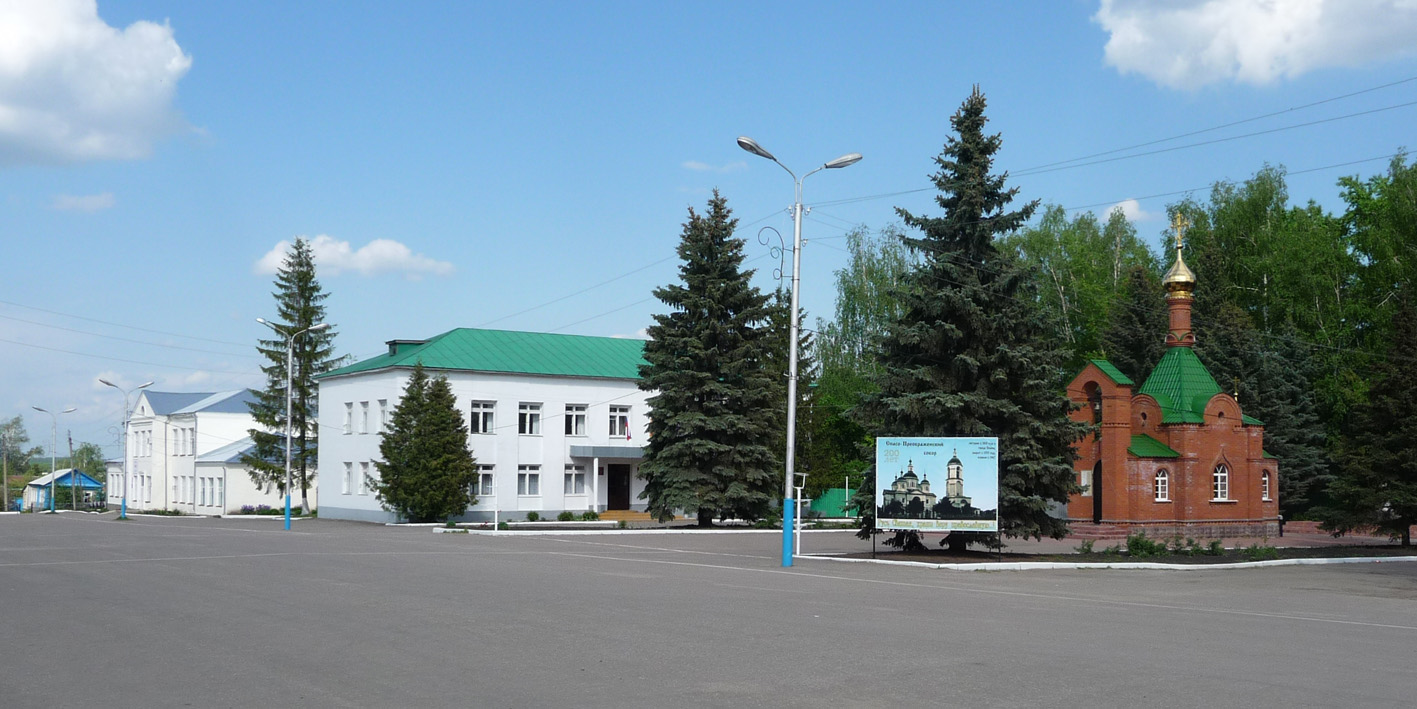
- Spassk central square

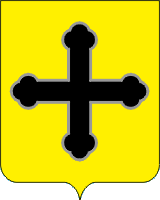
- Flag Coat of arms
- Interactive map of Spassk
- Location of Spassk Spassk (Penza Oblast)
- Coordinates: 53°56′N 43°11′E
- Country: Russia
- Federal subject: Penza Oblast
- Administrative district: Spassky District
- Town of district significanceSelsoviet: Spassk
- Founded: 1663
- Elevation: 170 m (560 ft)

Population (2010 Census)
  - Total: 7,442
  - Estimate (2021): 6,936 (−6.8%)

Administrative status
  - Capital of: Spassky District, town of district significance of Spassk

Municipal status
  - Municipal district: Spassky Municipal District
  - Urban settlement: Spassk Urban Settlement
  - Capital of: Spassky Municipal District, Spassk Urban Settlement
- Time zone: UTC+3 (MSK)
- Postal code: 442600
- OKTMO ID: 56606101001

Spassk (Russian: Спасск) is a town and the administrative center of Spassky District in Penza Oblast, Russia. Population: 7,442 (2010 census); 7,628 (2002 census); 8,299 (1989 Soviet census).

== History ==
In 1648, an uncultivated field was discovered in Shatsky Uyezd and was given to a nearby monastery. In 1663, a village was established there, called Bogdanovo (Богданово). In 1779, it was renamed Spassk and made the seat of an uyezd by a decree of Catherine the Great. However, soon it became apparent that confusion would result since several other towns in Russia shared the name (notably Spassk-Ryazansky) and the town was officially renamed Spassk-na-Studentse (Спасск-на-Студенце). In 1925, a communist party conference in the uyezd resolved that the town be renamed Bednodemyanovsk (Беднодемьяновск) in honor of the poet Demyan Bedny. Bedny himself never visited the town, but was said to maintain a lively correspondence with its inhabitants. In 2005, the original name of the town was restored, and the district was also renamed.

== Administrative and municipal status ==
Within the framework of administrative divisions, Spassk serves as the administrative center of Spassky District. As an administrative division, it is incorporated within Spassky District as the town of district significance of Spassk. As a municipal division, the town of district significance of Spassk is incorporated within Spassky Municipal District as Spassk Urban Settlement.
