= Lipetsky Uyezd =

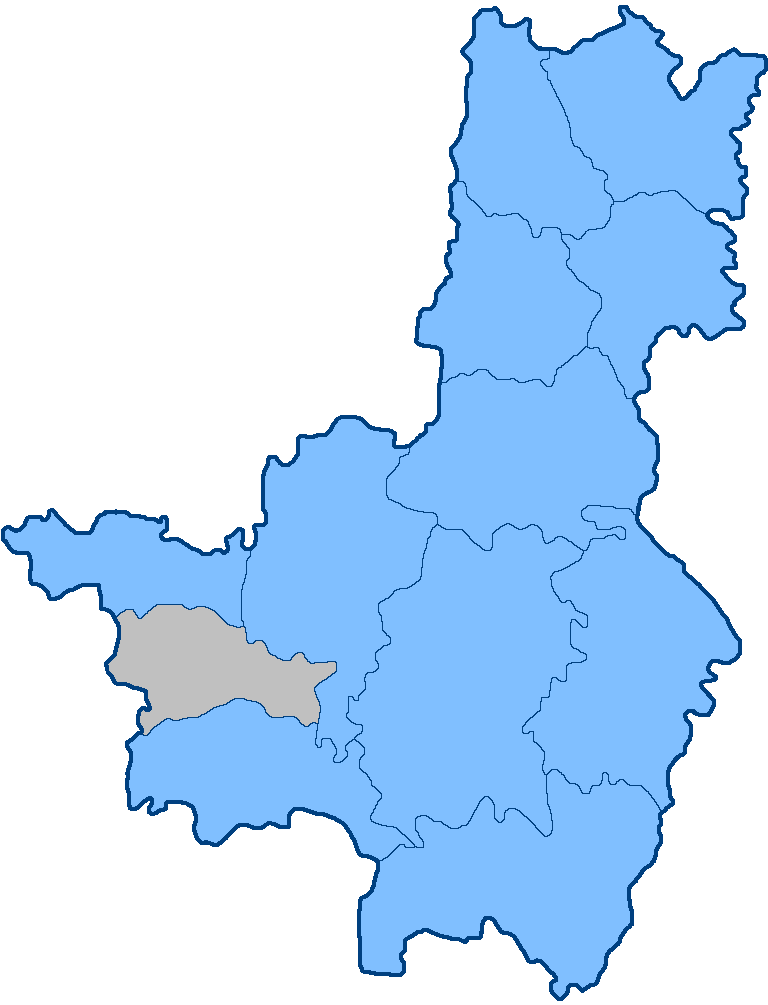
Location within Tambov Governorate

Lipetsky Uyezd (Липецкий уезд) was one of the subdivisions of the Tambov Governorate of the Russian Empire. It was situated in the western part of the governorate. Its administrative centre was Lipetsk.

== Demographics ==
At the time of the Russian Empire Census of 1897, Lipetsky Uyezd had a population of 164,350. Of these, 99.7% spoke Russian, 0.1% Yiddish and 0.1% Polish as their native language.
