= Tambov Governorate =

1796–1928 unit of Russia

Coordinates: 52°43′15″N 41°27′08″E

Tambov Governorate Тамбовская губерния
- Governorate of the Russian Empire
- 1796–1928
- Coat of arms

- Location within the Russian Empire
- Capital: Tambov
- Area
  - 1897: 66,589 km^{2} (25,710 sq mi)
- Population
  - 1897: 2,684,030
- History
  - Established: 1796
  - Abolished: 1928
Preceded by	Succeeded by
Tambov Viceroyalty	Central Black Earth Oblast
- Today part of: Russia

Tambov Governorate (Russian: Тамбовская губерния, romanized: Tambovskaya guberniya) was an administrative-territorial unit (guberniya) of the Russian Empire, the Russian Republic, and the Russian SFSR, with its capital in Tambov. It was located between 51°14' and 55°6' north and between 38°9' and 43°38' east. It bordered Vladimir Governorate and Nizhny Novgorod Governorate to north, Penza Governorate and Saratov Governorate to the east, Voronezh Governorate to south and west, and Oryol Governorate, Tula Governorate, and Ryazan Governorate to the west.

== History ==
The governorate was created in 1796 when it was reformed out of Tambov Viceroyalty (namestnichestvo) that was organized in 1779. The borders of it were unchanged until 1926 when the northern half of the governorate was split between other two governorates of Penza and Ryazan. Due to the administrative reform of 1928 Tambov governorate was divided into three okrugs: Tambov Okrug, Kozlov Okrug, and Borisoglebsk Okrug. In 1937 a substantial part of the governorate was transformed into Tambov Oblast out of Voronezh Oblast. During the times of Tambov rebellion 1920–1922 some part of the governorate became the separatist political formation, the Republic of Tambov, with Shendiapin as the head of the state. Later the republic was overwhelmed by the forces of the RKKA (See the main article: Tambov rebellion).

In the 1920s, ethnologist Pyotr Petrovich Ivanov has conducted a major excavation that uncovered evidence of the culture of Mordvins that inhibited the area in the first millennium CE.

== Administrative division ==
The governorate was divided into twelve uyezds. In 1864, when the Zemstvo Law was passed, the uyezds and governorates received a certain degree of self-government governed by zemstvo (local council).

- Borisoglebsky Uyezd (Borisoglebsk)
- Kirsanovsky Uyezd (Kirsanov)
- Kozlovsky Uyezd (Kozlov)
- Lebedyansky Uyezd (Lebedyan)
- Lipetsky Uyezd (Lipetsk)
- Morshansky Uyezd (Morshansk)
- Shatsky Uyezd (Shatsk)
- Spassky Uyezd (Spassk)
- Tambovsky Uyezd (Tambov)
- Temnikovsky Uyezd (Temnikov)
- Usmansky Uyezd (Usman)
- Yelatomsky Uyezd (Yelatma)

Big cities of over 10,000 were Tambov, Kozlov, Morshansk, Lipetsk (today in Lipetsk Oblast), and Borisoglebsk (today in Voronezh Oblast).

== Demographics ==
The population of the governorate consisted largely (over 90%) of the ethnic Russians with some Mordvins, Meshchera (extinct Russian ethnic subgroup), and Volga Tatars residing in the north and northwest. In 1825 the Russian Subbotniks were expelled from the governorate by authorities while being labelled as Jews.

Since 18th century and until 1858 the Russian government conducted the population revisions of around 10 that were documented.

According to the Russian Empire Census of 1897 the population of the governorate constituted 2.1% of whole population of the Russian Empire, accounting for 2,684,030 people out of which 1,301,723 (48.5%) were males and 1,382,307 (51.5%) were females.

The estimated population in 1906 was 3,205,200.

=== Languages ===
At the time of the Russian Empire Census of 1897, Tambov Governorate had a population of 2,684,030. Of these, 95.5% spoke Russian, 3.3% Mordvin, 0.6% Tatar, 0.2% Ukrainian, 0.1% Belarusian, 0.1% Yiddish and 0.1% Polish as their native language.

=== Religion ===
Almost everybody were the followers of the Russian Eastern Orthodoxy (over 95%) with insignificant number of Muslims and Molokans.

== Geography ==
Tambov was one of the largest and most fertile governments of central Russia, extending from north to south between the basins of the Oka and the Don, and having the governments of Vladimir and Nizhniy-Novgorod on the north, Penza and Saratov on the east, Voronezh on the south, and Orel, Tula and Ryazan on the West. It has an area of 25,703 sq. miles, and consisted of an undulating plain intersected by deep ravines and broad valleys, ranging 450 to 800 ft. above sea-level. Cretaceous and Jurassic deposits, thickly covered with boulder-clay and loess, were widely spread over its surface, concealing the underlying Devonian and Carboniferous strata. These last crop out in the deeper ravines, and seams of coal have been noticed at several places. Iron ore (in the north-west), limestone, clay and gypsum are obtained, and traces of petroleum have been discovered. The mineral waters of Lipetsk, similar to those of Franzensbad in their alkaline elements, and chalybeate like those of Pyrmont and Spa, are well known in Russia. The Oka touches the north-west corner of the region, but its tributaries, the Moksha and the Tsna, are important channels of traffic. The Don also merely touches Tambov, and of its affluents none except the Voronezh, the Khopyor and the Vorona, a tributary of the Khopyor, are at all navigable. As a whole, it is only in the north that Tambov is well drained; in the south, which is exposed to the dry south-east winds, the want of moisture is much felt, especially in the district of Borisoglyebsk. The climate is continental, and, although the average temperature at Tambov is 42 °F., the winter is comparatively cold (January, 13°; July, 68°). The rivers remain frozen for four and a half months. The soil is fertile throughout; in the north it is clayey and sometimes sandy, but the rest of the government was covered with a sheet, 2 to 3 feet thick, of black earth.

== History ==
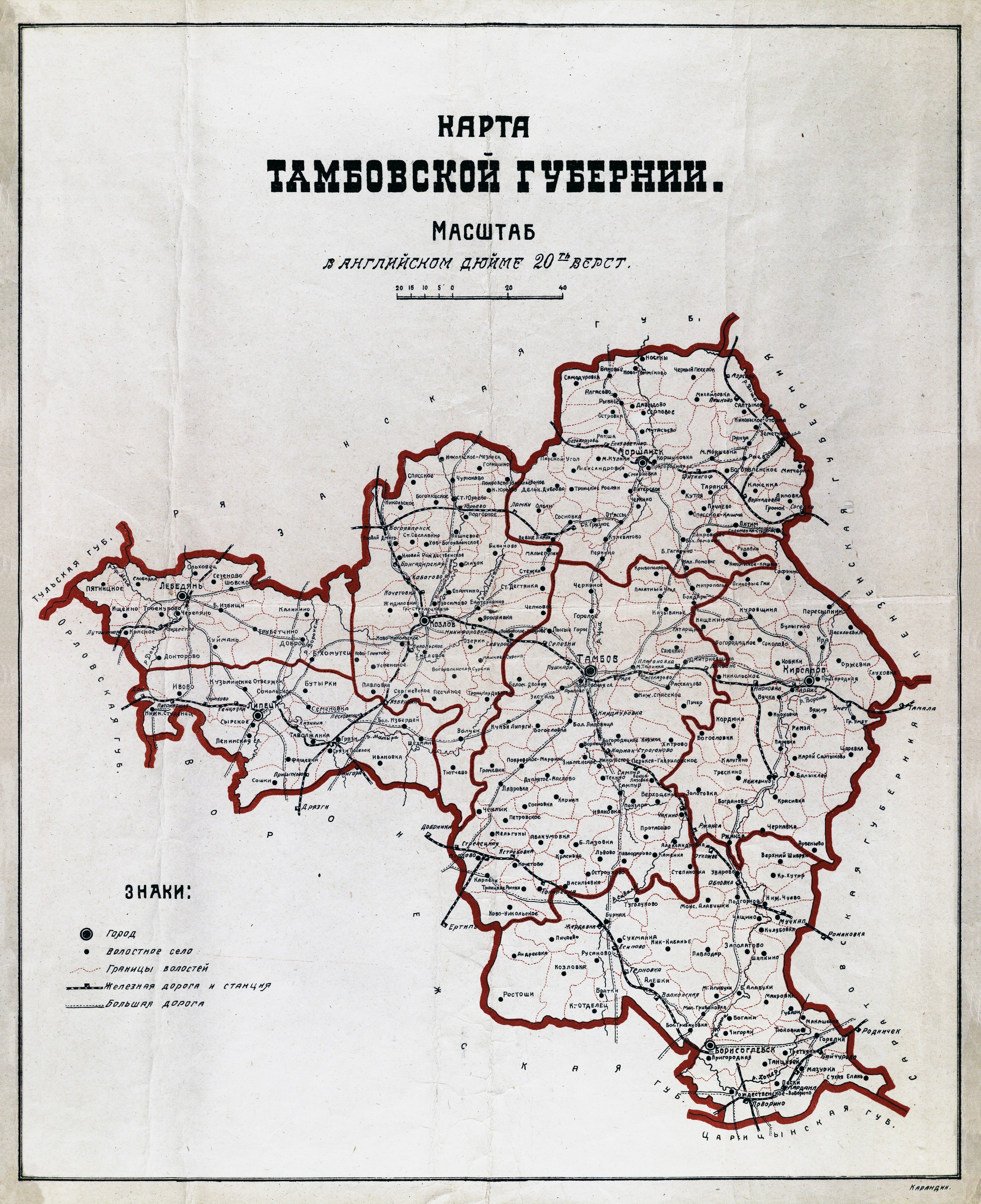
Map of Tambov Governorate 1923

The region included in the north of the government was settled by Russians during the earliest centuries of the principality of Moscow, but until the end of the 17th century the fertile tracts in the south remained too insecure for settlers. In the following century a few immigrants began to come in from the steppe, and landowners who had received large grants of land from the tsars began to bring their serfs from central Russia.

== See also ==
- Tambov
