= Alfred Silkiewicz =

Galician photographer (1855–1903)

- Born: 1855; Ternopil
- Died: 1903 (aged 47–48)
- Occupation: Photographer

Alfred Silkiewicz (1855 – 1903) was a Galician photographer.

== Biography ==
Alfred Silkiewicz was born in 1855 in the city of Ternopil in a military family.

He studied photography in Lviv (Ukraine) and Prague (Czech Republic). He opened his first photo studio "Janina" in the city of Nowy Sącz (Poland). During 1881–1882, he opened his own photo salon "Fotografia kabinetowa", which most likely ceased to exist at the end of the 19th century.

Silkevych's oeuvre includes photographic portraits of famous people from the Ternopil Oblast, including Solomiya Krushelnytska and Volodymyr Luchakivskyi, and actors from the Ukrainska Besida Theatre, including Ivanna Biberovycheva, Antonina Osypovych, Ivanna Stefurakova, Karolina Klishovska, Andrii Stechynskyi, and Anton Klishovskyi (the originals are kept in the Vasyl Stefanyk National Scientific Library).

In July 1887, during the 2nd regional ethnographic exhibition in Ternopil, he made an album of 50 photographs of peasants in folk costumes from different regions of Galicia and Bukovyna. Some of these photographs are kept in the collections of the Ternopil Oblast Museum, the Ethnographic Museum in Lviv, and the Prague National Museum (Czech Republic).

He died in 1902 (according to other sources, 1903).

== Family ==
He was married to Janina Hubner.

From 1859, his daughter Wilhelmina was married to August Freund. It is known that August first carried out his chemical experiments in the laboratory of Silkiewicz's photo studio.
