= Yuri Kuryanovich =

Belarusian writer, translator, historian, and artist

Yuri Vladimirovich Kuryanovich Юрый Кур'яновiч
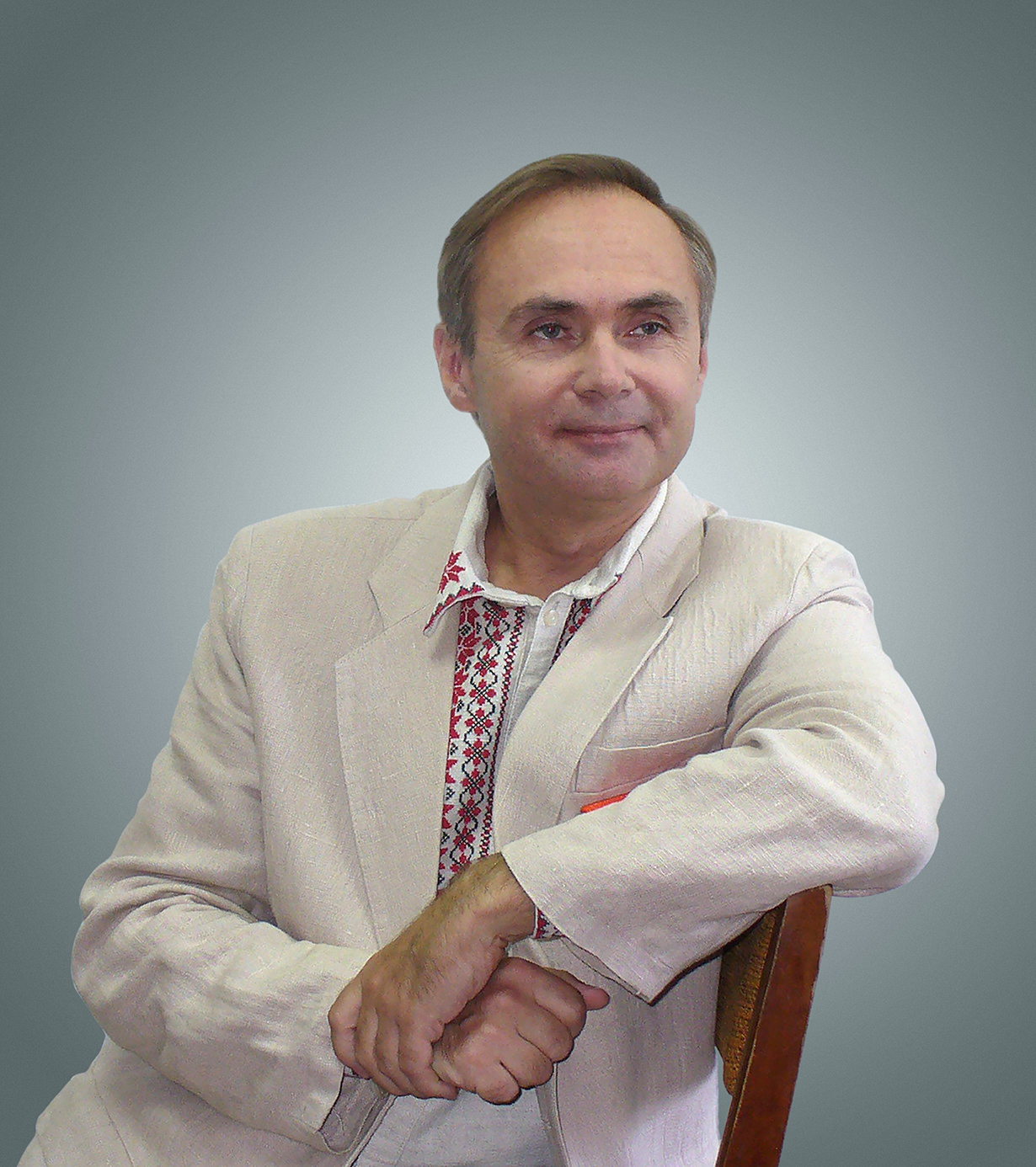
- Born: September 5, 1968 (age 57); Minsk, Belarus
- Occupations: Poet and writer
- Writing career
- Period: 1986–

Yuri Vladimirovich Kuryanovich (Bel. Yuriy (Yuras) Uladzimiravich Kur'yanovich; September 5, 1968, Minsk) is a Belarusian writer, translator, historian, and artist.

In 1991, he graduated from the Belarusian State Institute of National Economy, in 2013 - post-graduate of the Belarusian State Pedagogical University by specialty «National history». Member of the Union of Belarusian Writers since 2006.

At the end of the 1990s – for the first time in the Belarusian periodicals – he wrote about the "mysterious stone cross" at Borisoglebsky cemetery in Turaŭ («Centralnaja gazeta», «Nioman», «Biarozka» magazines). Today it is one of the famous tourist and pilgrimage sites of Polesia.

For the first time translated into Belarusian the works of a number of Ukrainian authors (collection of prose «Sunflowers bloom», 2012), including memories of scientist-chemist, teacher, writer Peter Franco (1890 - 1941), who has devoted a separate book «Petro Franko. Aviator, chemist, writer» (2019).

Author of the collections of prose «He and She» (1996), «Urban Elegy» (2007), popular science books «Stories of old Lošyca» (2005), «Belarusian Criminal Investigation» (2018), «Old Lošyca» (2018), «Turaŭ ancient and modern» (2019).

Held 12 personal exhibitions of painting (oil, canvas), organized under the title «Variations on the age-old», and a series of photo exhibitions («Landscapes of the Belarusian Palestine», «Memories of Childhood», «Breath of the Carpathians»). Pictures are stored in the art gallery Puсhаvičy Local History Museum (Marjina Horka, Belarus), Lviv National Literary-Memorial Museum of Ivan Franko (Lviv, Ukraine), Literary-Memorial Museum of Ivan Franko in the village Kryvorivnia (Verchovina district, Ivano-Frankivsk region), in private collections.
