= Olha Franko =

Ukrainian culinary author

- Ольга Франко
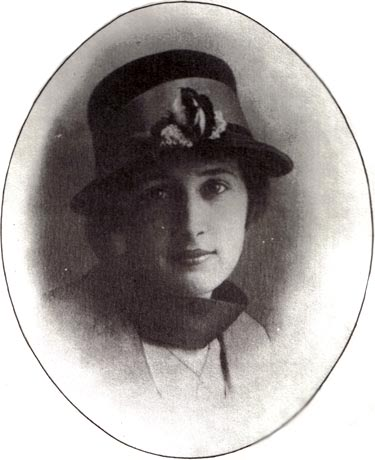
- Born: 24 July 1896; Vyriv, Ukraine
- Died: 27 March 1987 (aged 90); Lviv, Ukraine
- Education: Higher School of Agriculture, Vienna
- Occupation: Author
- Spouse: Petro Franko

Olha Fedorivna Franko (née Bilevych; Ukrainian: Ольга Федорівна Франко; 24 July 1896 – 27 March 1987) was a Ukrainian writer and creator of cookbooks.

== Early life and education ==
Franko was born on 24 July 1896. She studied culinary cuisine at the Higher School of Agriculture in Vienna for two years.

== Writing ==
Franko wrote Practical Kitchen (практична кухня), published in 1929 in Kolomyia, a book focused on Galician recipes, although it also had about 20% Ukrainian recipes from other regions. It was said to be one of the first recipe books about Ukrainian cuisine. The book was reprinted in 1991 retitled Practical Cuisine, and again in 2019 with a foreword by Marianna Dushar. It contained recipes focused on traditional dishes made from local ingredients.

In 1937, Franko published her second book National Cuisine focused on the nutritional aspects of cooking.

== Advocacy ==
In her book, Franko to encouraged housewives to demand food quality inspections from local authorities.

== Family ==
Franko stemmed from the famous Bilevych family. After the death of his first wife she married Petro Franko, becoming the daughter-in-law of Ukrainian activist and poet Ivan Franko.

Olha Franko is often confused with her mother in law, as both have exactly the same name. Informally they went by "junior" and "senior" to avoid confusion.

== Death ==
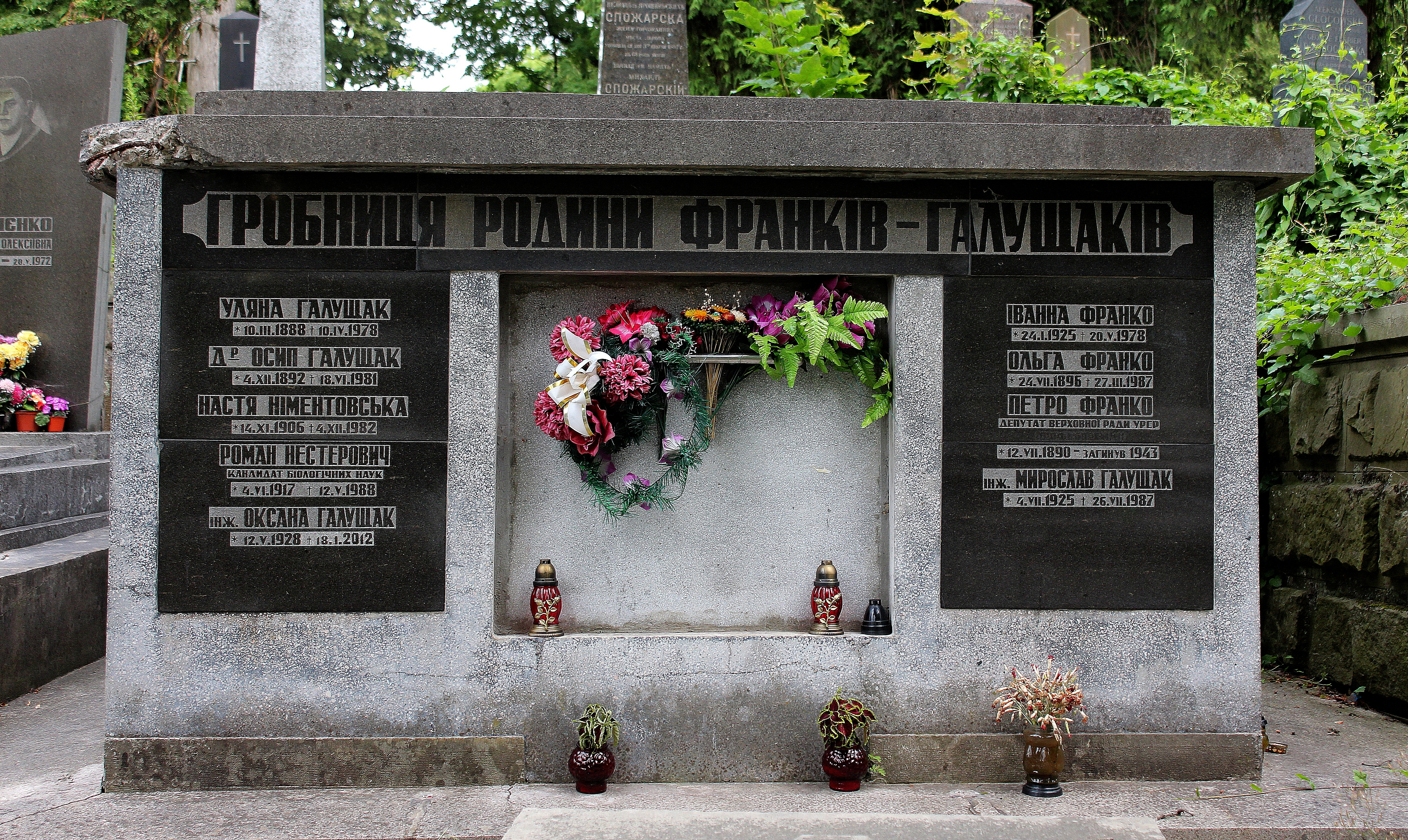
Franko-Halushchak family tomb. Lychakiv Cemetery, field No. 69.

In 1987, Franko died at the age of 90. Although her husband had been killed in 1941, she never learned of his fate.
