= Vasyl Shchurat =

Ukrainian educator, literary critic, poet, and translator (1871–1948)

- Василь Григорович Щурат
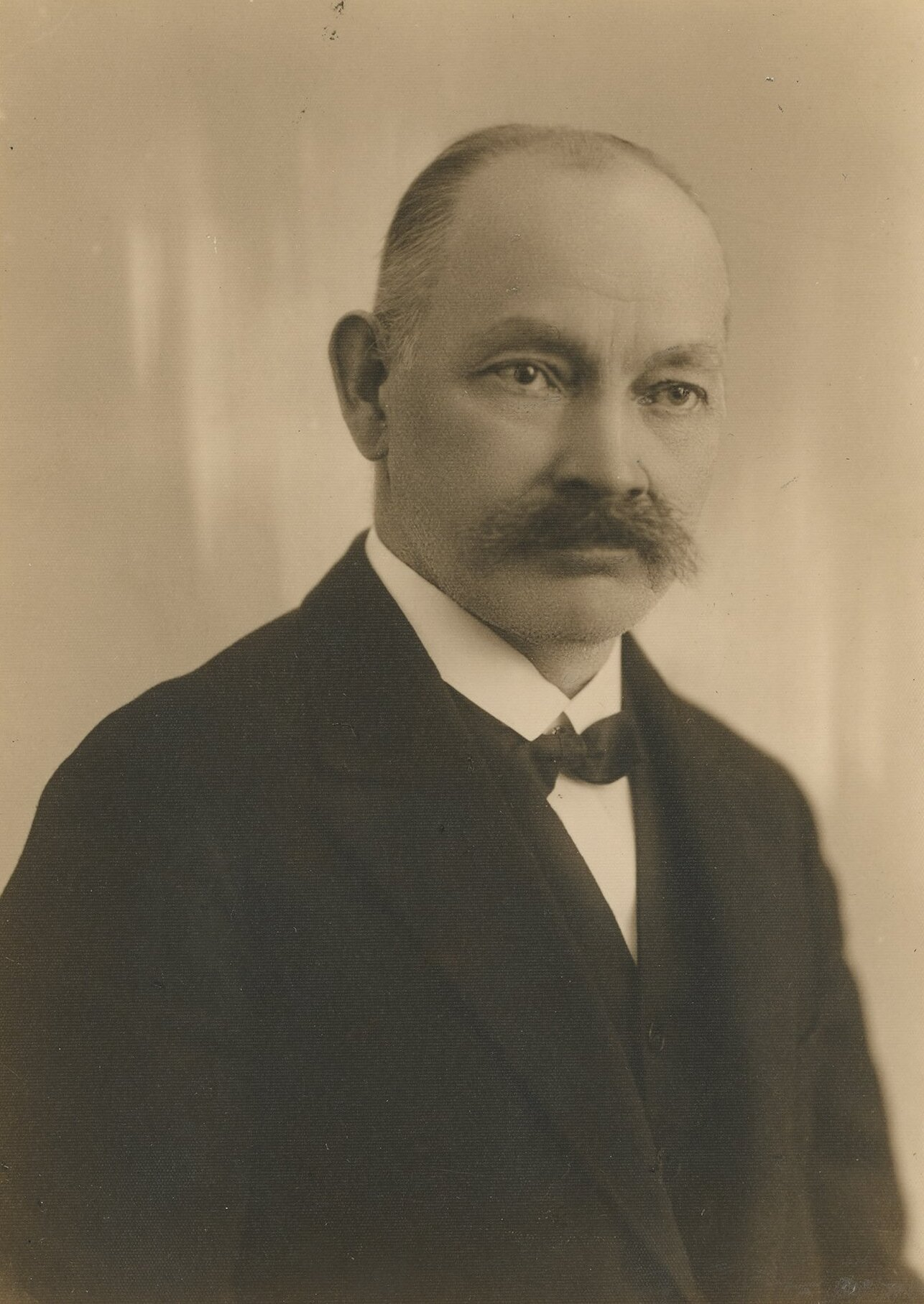
- Born: 24 August 1871; Vysloboky, now Lviv Oblast, Ukraine
- Died: 27 April 1948 (aged 76); Lviv
- Education: Universities of Lviv and Vienna
- Occupations: Educator, literary critic, poet and translator

Vasyl Shchurat (Ukrainian: Василь Григорович Щурат; 24 August 1871 – 27 April 1948) was a Ukrainian educator, literary critic, poet and translator. In 1895, he completed a full translation of "Song of Roland" into Ukrainian. He was the author of the best verse translation of "The Tale of Igor's Campaign" into modern Ukrainian before 1914 (1907). He was the father of the scholar and literary critic Stepan Shchurat.

== Biography ==
He was a native of the village of Vysloboky in the Lviv Oblast. He completed his studies in Slavic philology in 1895 at the universities of Lviv and Vienna (receiving his doctorate from Vatroslav Jagić), and he passed his pedagogical exam at the Chernivtsi University in 1898.

Ivan Franko introduced Shchurat to the literary, scientific, civic, and journalistic life of Lviv and Vienna. Shchurat remained under his influence until 1896. Shchurat published articles, poetic translations, and original poems in the Austrian, Polish, Czech, and Western Ukrainian press. He was a co-editor of the newspaper "Bukovyna" in Chernivtsi, and the editor of the magazines "Moloda Muza" (1906), "Svit", and the weekly "Nedilia" (1912). For political reasons, he supported the "Dilo" organization.

From 1898 to 1934, he taught at state gymnasiums in Przemyśl, Brody, and Lviv (starting in 1907). In 1921, he refused to pledge allegiance to the Polish state and became the director of the private women's gymnasium of the Basilian Sisters in Lviv (1921–1934).

In 1914, Shchurat was elected a full member of the Shevchenko Scientific Society, and he served as its chairman from 1915 to 1923. He was actively involved in the struggle for a Ukrainian university, and after its failure, he became the initiator and first rector of the Secret Ukrainian University (1921–1923). In 1930, due to the Union for the Liberation of Ukraine process and subsequent repressions in Ukraine, he renounced his status as a full member of the All-Ukrainian Academy of Sciences, which he had been granted in June 1929 along with M. S. Vozniak and F. M. Kolessa for "language and literature" (he was reinstated as a full member of the UAN after the Bolshevik occupation of Galicia in 1939). In the final years of his life, he worked as the director of the Lviv Library of the Academy of Sciences of the Ukrainian SSR and as a professor at University of Lviv.

Ivan Franko wrote a poetic response, the poem "Dekadent", to Shchurat's accusations.

He died on 24 April 1948, in Lviv. He is buried in Lychakiv Cemetery.

== Creativity ==
Shchurat's literary criticism was thematically diverse, ranging from old Ukrainian literature ("Praying of Daniel the Immured", 1896) to 19th-century literature, including works on Taras Shevchenko, Markiian Shashkevych, Panteleimon Kulish, Ivan Kotliarevsky, Yuriy Fedkovych, Ivan Franko, Volodymyr Samiilenko, Hryhorii Kvitka-Osnovianenko, and others ("Literarni Nacherky", 1913).

His collections of poetry include:

- Lux in tenebris (1895)
- Moi lysty (1898)
- Raz do mene molodist pryishla, Na trembiti (1904)
- Istorychni pisni (1907)
- Vybir pisen (1909)
- The poem V suzdalskii tiurmi (1916)

From 1898 to 1900, he published a series of artistic works called Artystychno-literaturni novyny. In 1900 and 1905, Shchurat published the verse prayer book Iz hlybyny vozzvakh, and in 1902, the poem Zarvanytsia, which were examples of Ukrainian religious poetry.

In addition, he translated extensively from ancient poets (Horace), French ("The Song of Roland"), German (Heine, Goethe), Polish (Adam Mickiewicz, Juliusz Słowacki, Maria Konopnicka, Adam Asnyk, Jan Kasprowicz, Kazimierz Przerwa-Tetmajer), and others.

Shchurat dedicated a great deal of attention to Ukrainian-Polish relations, particularly in literature (studies "Shevchenko and the Poles", 1917; "The Foundations of Shevchenko's Connections with the Poles", 1917; "Koliivshchyna in Polish Literature until 1841", 1910).

Shchurat's works were primarily published in the "Notes of the NTSH". Posthumous editions of Shchurat's works include: "Poetry" (Lviv, 1957 and 1962), "Selected Works on the History of Literature" (Kyiv, 1963). He is credited with the translation of "The Tale of Igor's Campaign" into modern Ukrainian (1907).

He is the author of the historical and local history article "Churches of the Greek Catholic Parish in Brody" (Svit, 1907, No. 5, pp. 78-80) and "The Beginnings of the Glory of the Ukrainian Folk Song in Galicia" by Dr. Vasyl Shchurat (Lviv: Published by the "Prosvita" Society, 1927, 16 p., incl. cover; "Prosvita" Society publication).

== Bibliography ==
- Кошелівець І. Щурат Василь // Енциклопедія українознавства : Словникова частина : [в 11 т.] / Наукове товариство імені Шевченка ; гол. ред. проф., д-р Володимир Кубійович. — Париж — Нью-Йорк : Молоде життя, 1984. — Кн. 2, [т. 10] : Хмельницький Борис — Яцків. — С. 3921—3922. — ISBN 5-7707-4049-3.
- Галайчак Т. Щурат Василь Григорович // Енциклопедія історії України : у 10 т. / редкол.: В. А. Смолій (голова) та ін. ; Інститут історії України НАН України. — К. : Наукова думка, 2013. — Т. 10 : Т — Я. — С. 688. — ISBN 978-966-00-1359-9.
- Франко 3. Т. Щурат Василь Григорович // Українська мова : енциклопедія / НАН України, Інститут мовознавства ім. О. О. Потебні, Інститут української мови; редкол.: В. М. Русанівський (співголова), О. О. Тараненко (співголова), М. П. Зяблюк та ін. — 2-ге вид., випр. і доп. — К. : Вид-во «Укр. енцикл.» ім. М. П. Бажана, 2004. — 824 с. : іл. — ISBN 966-7492-19-2. — С. 809.
- Щурат Василь Григорович // Шевченківська енциклопедія : у 6 т. / Гол. ред. М. Г. Жулинський. — Київ : Ін-т літератури ім. Т. Г. Шевченка, 2015. — Т. 6: Т—Я. — С. 1033.
- Щурат Василь // Українська мала енциклопедія : 16 кн. : у 8 т. / проф. Є. Онацький. — Накладом Адміністратури УАПЦ в Аргентині. — Буенос-Айрес, 1967. — Т. 8, кн. XVI : Літери Уш — Я. — С. 2108. — 1000 екз.
- Автобіографія Василя Щурата // Архів Львівського національного університету імені І. Франка.
