= Another Franko =

2024 drama film

- Directed by: Ighor Vysnevskyi, Vitaliy Malakhov
- Written by: Taras Borovok, Dmytro Naumov
- Produced by: Dmytro Kravchenko
- Cinematography: Andriy Mironyuk, Tetyana Dudnyk
- Production company: Ganza Film
- Release date: September 11, 2021 (KFF)
- Running time: 90 min.
- Country: Ukraine
- Language: Ukrainian
- Budget: ₴ 30 million

Another Franko (Ukrainian: «Інший Франко», romanized: Inshyi Franko) is a Ukrainian film about Petro Franko, son of Ukrainian writer Ivan Franko. The premiere in Ukraine took place on 8 February 2024. A teaser for the film was shown on 25 August 2019, and the official trailer was released on 26 December 2023.

== Plot ==
The film's events unfold in June 1941 at the Franko estate in Lviv. An unexpected guest arrives at the family home – Petro Franko's old friend Andriy Hryshchuk. They stood together at the origins of the scout organization Plast, competed for the love of the same woman, escaped from a plane engulfed in flames, fled from captivity, and saved children from starvation in Soviet Kharkiv. The friends meet during the height of World War II. Petro Franko was one of the founders of Plast, a pilot, founder of aviation in the Galician Army, a scientist who held 36 scientific patents for inventions, and worked as a deputy of the Verkhovna Rada of Ukrainian SSR. He was repressed by the Soviet authorities, deported to Siberia, and died under mysterious circumstances on the way.

== Cast ==
Actor	Role	Notes
Vyacheslav Dovzhenko	Petro Franko	Portrayed between 43 and 51 years
Roman Kulish	Petro Franko	Portrayed between 23 and 29 years
Akhtem Seitablaiev	Andriy Hryshchuk	Petro's friend and rival
Andriy Fedinchyk	Andriy Hryshchuk	Portrayed in his youth
Nadiya Levchenko	Olga Franko	Franko's wife
Liliya Yuskevych	Olga Franko	Portrayed in her youth
Iryna Kudashova	Asya Franko	Petro Franko's daughter
Maksym Donets	Maksym	NKVD agent
Yana Kovernyk	Vira Franko	

== Filming ==
Filming took place in Kyiv in one of the pavilions of the factory "Kuznya on Rybalsky", and in the city of Lviv in Stryiskyi Park and the memorial museum "Franko House". The film's authors consulted with Petro Franko's grandchildren and museum staff. A replica of a World War I "Albatros" model aircraft was built for the film. The aircraft is marked with tail number LVGC-15960, the same tail number that Petro Franko flew with. Petro Franko's voice was used in the creation of the film. During production, the filmmakers received two digitized archival recordings featuring Petro Franko from Plast member Taras Zen. One recording, dating from 1939, contains footage of Franko speaking at the Supreme Soviet and preserves his voice. According to Zen, the filmmakers used the archival material as a reference when preparing the film.

== Music ==
The film features music by the Ukrainian a cappella formation — "Pikardiiska Tertsiia", called "Rozproshchavsia Strilets".

== Release ==
The Ukrainian premiere of Another Franko took place on 11 September 2021, in the national competition program of the Khmelnytskyi Film Festival.

== Reception ==
Another Franko received mixed reviews. Detector Media criticised the limited promotion of the state-funded film, while Suspilne Culture questioned its screenplay and historical accuracy. Local History also reported criticism of the film's historical inaccuracies and production quality.

== Awards and nominations ==
List of awards and nominations
Film festival/Film award	Year	Category	Nominee(s)	Result	Src
Khmelnytskyi Film Festival	2021	Best Acting	Vyacheslav Dovzhenko	Won	
