= Zhovtantsi rural hromada =

Hromada in Lviv Oblast, Ukraine

Zhovtantsi rural hromada Жовтанецька сільська громада
- Hromada
- Interactive map of Zhovtantsi rural hromada
- Country: Ukraine
- Oblast: Lviv Oblast
- Raion: Lviv Raion
- Admin. center: Zhovtantsi

Area
  - Total: 1,504 km^{2} (581 sq mi)

Population (2021)
  - Total: 10,127
  - Density: 6.733/km^{2} (17.44/sq mi)
- CATOTTG code: UA46060150000060045
- Settlements: 14
- Villages: 14
- Website: zhovtanetska-gromada.gov.ua

Zhovtantsi rural hromada (Ukrainian: Жовтанецька сільська громада) is a hromada in Ukraine, in Lviv Raion of Lviv Oblast. The administrative center is the village of Zhovtantsi.

== Settlements ==
The hromada consists of 14 villages:

- Velyke Kolodno
- Vyriv
- Vysloboky
- Vykhopni
- Horpyn
- Hrabovets
- Zhovtantsi
- Kolodentsi
- Novyi Stav
- Pechykhvosty
- Remeniv
- Stavnyky
- Chestyni
- Yakymiv
