= Yakymiv =

Rural locality in Lviv Oblast, Ukraine

Yakymiv Якимів
- Village
- Location within Lviv Oblast
- Coordinates: 49°58′29″N 24°20′38″E
- Country: Ukraine
- Oblast: Lviv Oblast
- District: Lviv Raion
- Established: 1547

Area
  - Total: 0,680 km^{2} (260 sq mi)
- Elevation /(average value of): 234 m (768 ft)

Population
  - Total: 299
  - Density: 0.44/km^{2} (1.1/sq mi)
- Time zone: UTC+2 (EET)
  - Summer (DST): UTC+3 (EEST)
- Postal code: 80441
- Area code: +380 3254
- Website: село Якимів/райцентр Кам'янка-Бузька^{(Ukrainian)}

Yakymiv (Ukrainian: Яки́мів) is a village (selo) in Lviv Raion, Lviv Oblast (province) of Western Ukraine. It belongs to Zhovtantsi rural hromada, one of the hromadas of Ukraine. Yakymiv is a small village, that has the population just about 299 persons. Local government is administered by Vyrivska village council.

== History ==
The first chronicle mention of Yakymiv dates back to 1578.

Until 18 July 2020, Yakymiv belonged to Kamianka-Buzka Raion. The raion was abolished in July 2020 as part of the administrative reform of Ukraine, which reduced the number of raions of Lviv Oblast to seven. The area of Kamianka-Buzka Raion was split between Chervonohrad and Lviv Raions, with Yakymiv being transferred to Lviv Raion.

== Church of the Cathedral of St. John the Baptist of the Ukrainian Greek Catholic Church ==
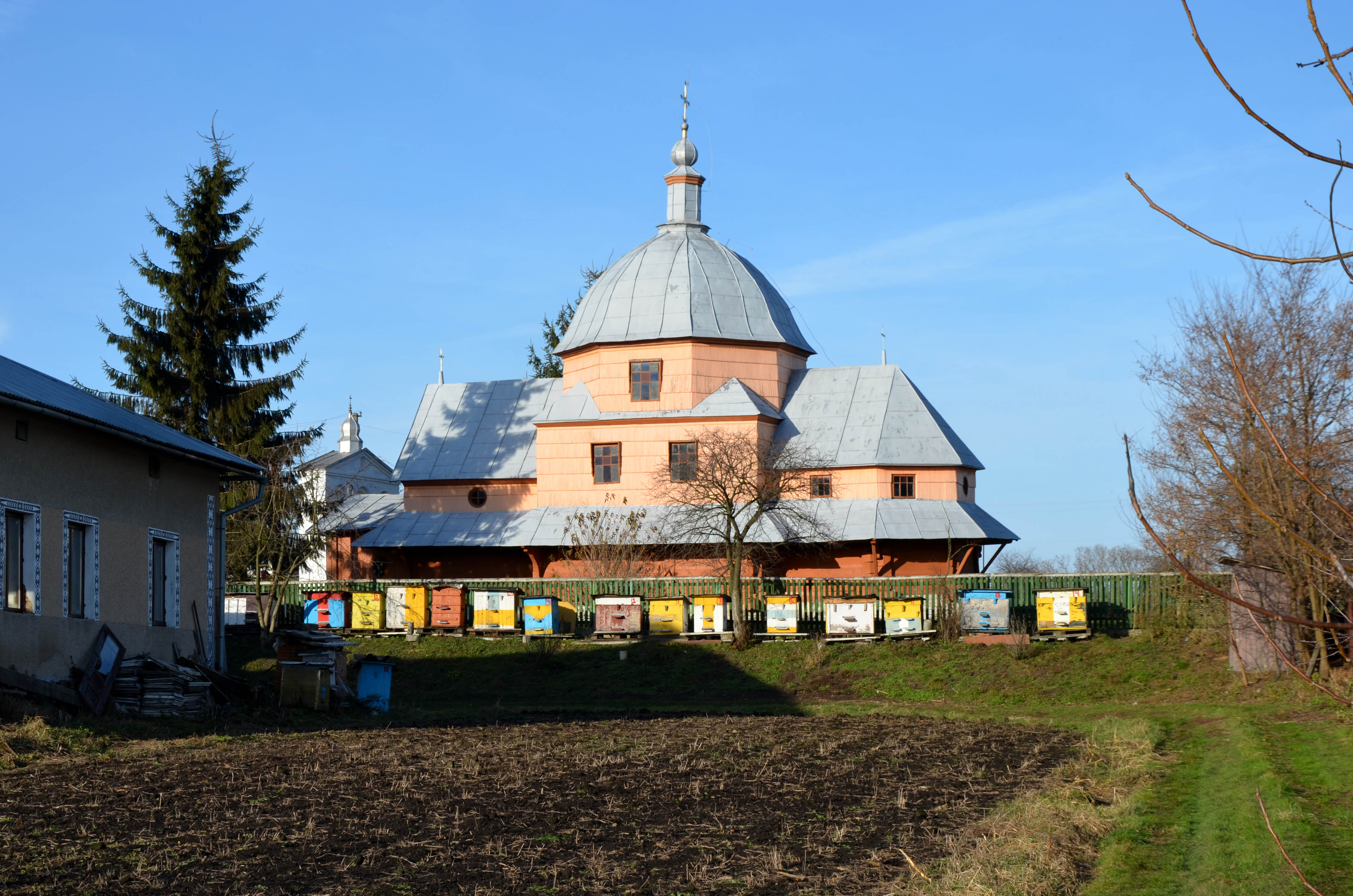
Synaxis of John the Baptist church, Yakymiv

The church was built in 1852.

The wooden church stands at the beginning of Yakimov, on the rise, to the right of the road (if you go from the side of Vyrov). Until 1939, the church belonged to the Roman Catholic administration.

== Cultural life of the village ==
On October 13, 2019, the village of Yakymiv was visited by the American astronaut Heidemarie Stefanyshyn-Piper. Her father, Mykhailo Stefanyshyn, was born in the village. He was deported to Germany during World War II. After the war, he married a German woman, and together they emigrated to the United States. There they had a daughter and three sons, whom they raised in Ukrainian traditions. Gaidi is proud of her Ukrainian roots and visited Yakymiv to learn more about her past. The first woman astronaut of Ukrainian origin was presented with a loaf of bread by the community.

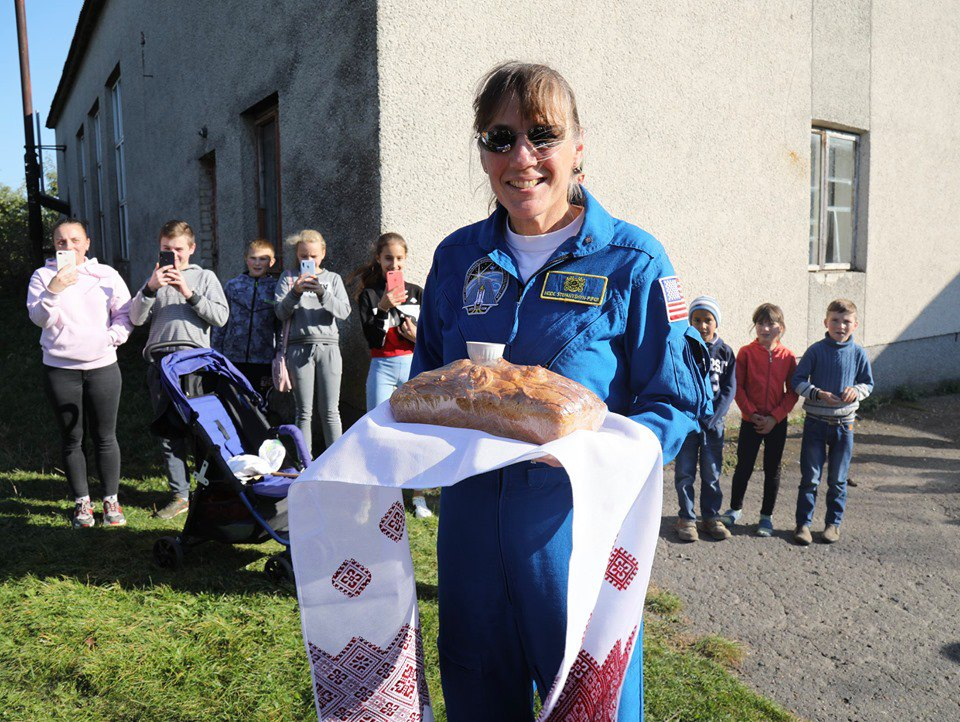
Meeting of Heidemarie Stefanyszyn-Piper in the village of Yakymiv (October 13, 2019)

The village has a People's House, a wooden church of the Cathedral of St. John the Baptist, a library.

== Geography ==
This village is located at a distance of 7 kilometres (4.3 mi) from the highway in European route E40 E40 connecting Lviv with Kyiv. The distance from the regional center Lviv is 37 kilometres (23 mi), and 23 kilometres (14 mi) from the district center Kamianka-Buzka.
