= Zhovtantsi =

Village in Lviv Oblast, Ukraine

Zhovtantsi Жовтанці
- Village
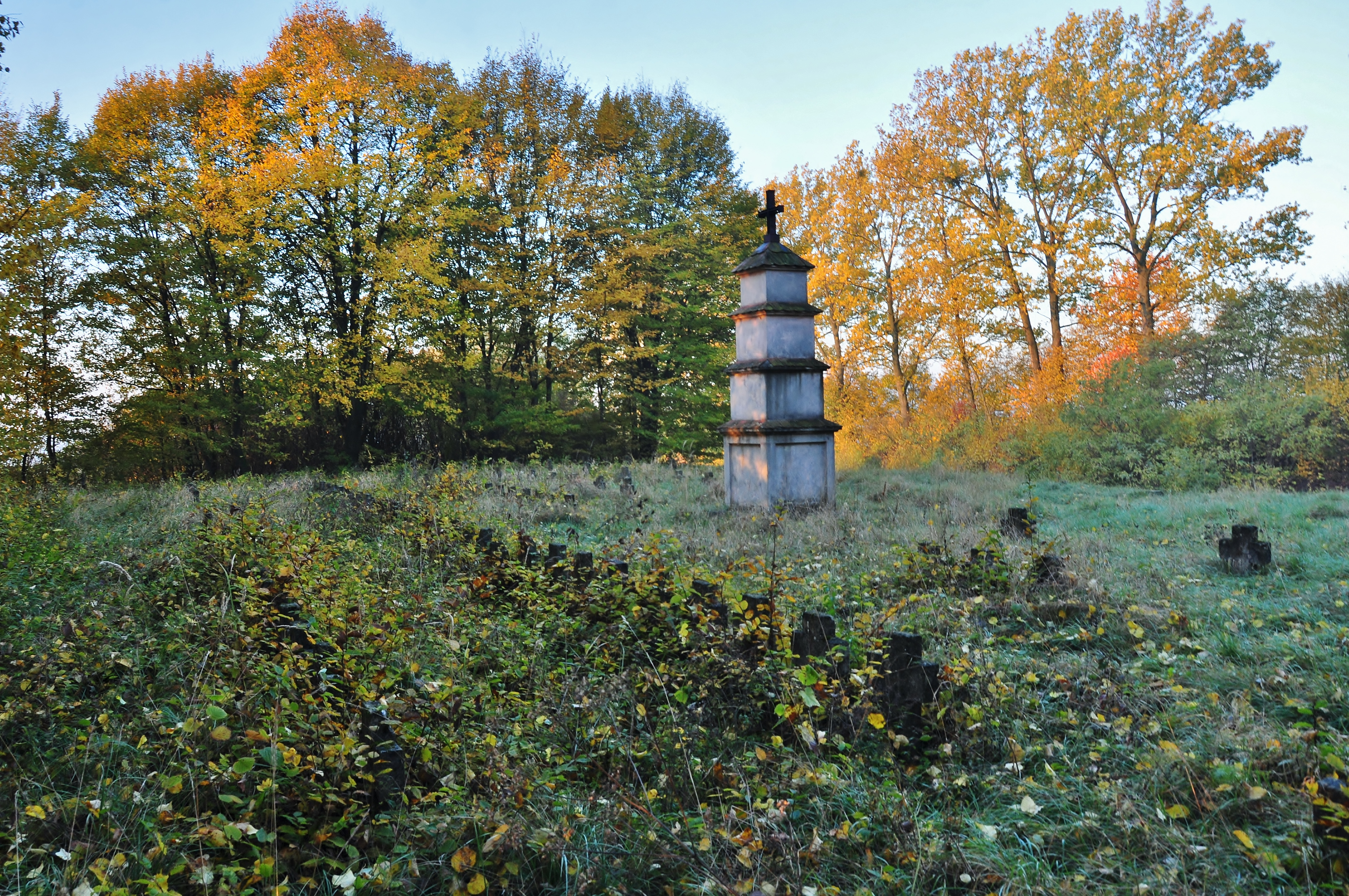
- The Austro-Hungarian Soldiers' Cemetery in Zhovtantsi

- Location of Zhovtantsi in Lviv Oblast Location of Zhovtantsi in Ukraine
- Coordinates: 49°59′33″N 24°14′18″E
- Country: Ukraine
- Oblast: Lviv Oblast
- Raion: Lviv Raion
- Hromada: Zhovtantsi rural hromada
- First mentioned: 1358

Population
  - Total: 5,066
  - Estimate (2023): 3,469

Zhovtantsi (Ukrainian: Жовтанці; Polish: Żółtańce) is a village in Lviv Raion, Lviv Oblast, in western Ukraine. It is the administrative centre of Zhovtantsi rural hromada, one of the hromadas of Ukraine. Its population is 5,066 (as of 2024).

== History ==
Zhovtantsi was first mentioned in 1358, at which time its population was primarily agrarian. In 2014, protests occurred in the village over the poor quality of the motorway from Zhovtantsi to Vykhopni. Protesters threatened to block Highway H17, linking the city of Lviv to Lutsk, if their demands were not met.

President of Ukraine Petro Poroshenko visited the village on 10 December 2018, as part of a trip to Lviv Oblast. While at Zhovtantsi, he paid his respects at a memorial to Ukrainian independence activists.

== Notable people ==
- Mykhailo Dyba, economist and police officer.
- Ruslan Filipsonov, senior sergeant of the Armed Forces of Ukraine.
- Petro Kashuba, chaplain of the Ukrainian Galician Army.
- Yulian Krynytskyi, field marshal of the Common Army.
- Lukian Krynytskyi, Ukrainian lawyer and politician in Austria-Hungary.
- Yurii Polianskyi, geologist, geographer, archaeologist, and Ukrainian Military Organization leader.
