= Yurii Polianskyi =

Ukrainian geographer, geomorphologist, geologist, archaeologist (1892–1975)

- Юрiй Іванович Полянський
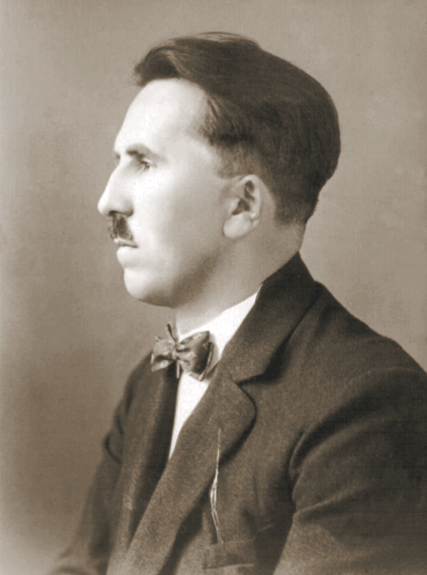
- Born: 6 March 1892; Zhovtantsi, Galicia, Austria-Hungary (now Ukraine)
- Died: 19 July 1975 (aged 83); Buenos Aires, Argentina
- Education: University of Vienna; University of Lviv
- Occupations: Geographer, geomorphologist, geologist, archaeologist

Yurii Polianskyi (Ukrainian: Юрiй Іванович Полянський; 6 March 1892, Zhovtantsi, now Lviv Oblast – 19 July 1975, Buenos Aires, Argentina) was a Ukrainian geographer, geomorphologist, geologist, archaeologist.

In 1928, he received a doctorate in geography. In 1930, he became a professor, and in 1956 an academician of the Argentine Academy of Sciences. From 1927 he has been a full member of the Shevchenko Scientific Society.

== Biography ==
He received his first education at the University of Vienna. In 1918, he graduated from University of Lviv.

During the World War I, he was a lieutenant in the Austrian Army's cannon regiment. In 1917–1921, he was an active participant in the Liberation Movement, in particular, in the proclamation of the Ukrainian People's Republic, served as a sergeant major in the Ukrainian Galician Army, and co-founded the Ukrainian Military Organization.

In 1921-1937 he worked as a teacher at the First Academic Gymnasium, and in 1921-1923 he was a professor at the Secret Ukrainian University. In 1933–1937, he taught at the Greek Catholic Theological Academy in Lviv. In 1928, he was appointed director of the Natural History Museum of the Shevchenko Scientific Society. In 1937-1939 he served as an inspector of secondary schools. From 1939 to 1941 he was the head of the Department of Geography at Lviv University. During the German occupation of Lviv from June to September 1941, he was the head of the Provisional Government, burgomaster.

From 1941 to 1945 he was a member of the Ukrainian Central Committee under the leadership of Volodymyr Kubiyovych. From 1943 he lived in Kraków, Poland, and later moved to Vienna, where he headed the representative office of the Ukrainian Central Committee. From 1945 to 1947, he worked as a professor at the Ukrainian Free University in Munich.

In 1947, he immigrated to Argentina. He worked at the State Geological Institute, and from 1956 he has been a professor at the State University of Buenos Aires.

=== Place of burial ===
He was buried in the cemetery of Monte Grande (Greater Buenos Aires, Argentina) in the first group of burials.

== Works ==
Polianskyi's research interests included the problems of geomorphology, Quaternary geology and archeology of Podillia, the Dniester basin and Western Polissia, as well as geology, geomorphology and neotectonics of Argentina.

From 1923 he conducted archaeological research in the villages of Ternopil Oblast. He discovered more than 70 Paleolithic sites in the Dniester basin.
