= Volodymyr Luchakivskyi =

Ukrainian public figure (1838–1903)

- Володимир Дмитрович Лучаківський
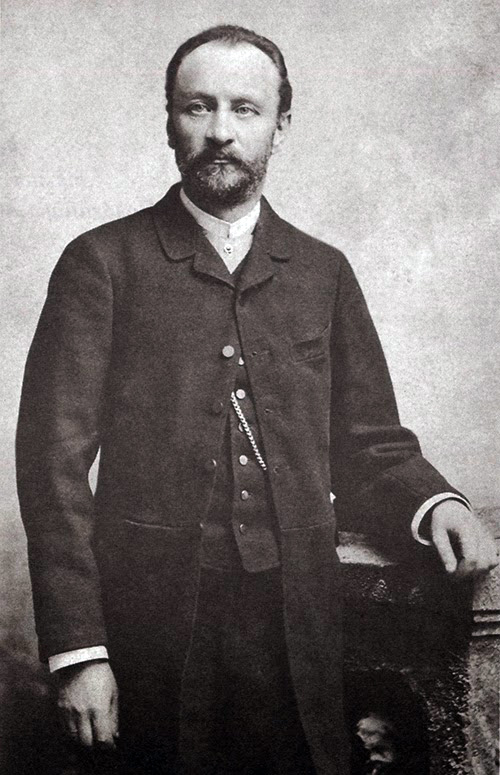
- Born: 19 March 1838; Remeniv, now Lviv Raion, Lviv Oblast, Ukraine
- Died: 11 April 1903 (aged 65); Ternopil
- Education: University of Lviv
- Occupations: Public figure, writer, translator, lawyer

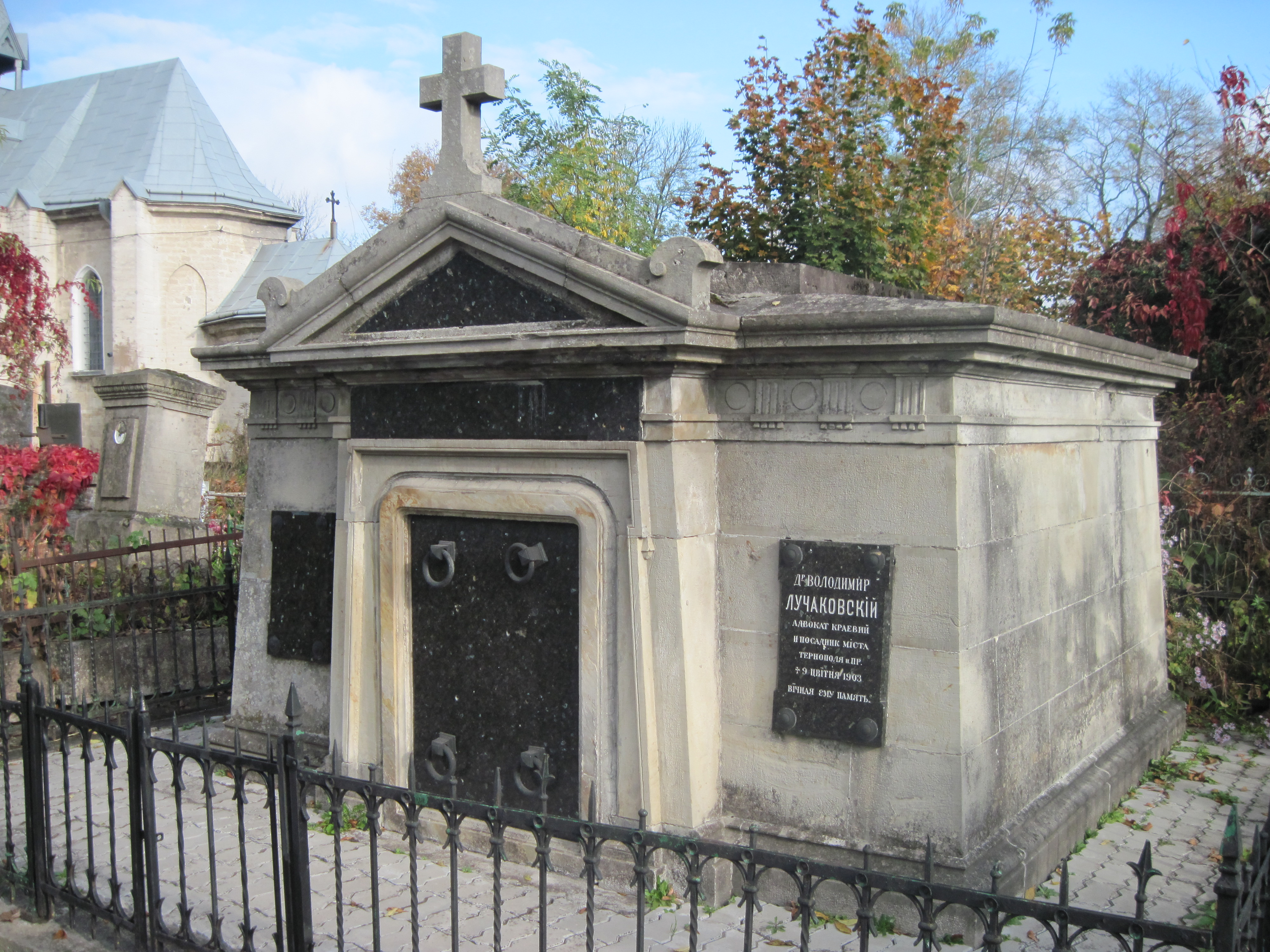
The tomb of Volodymyr Luchakivskyi in the Mykulynetskyi cemetery

Volodymyr Luchakivskyi (Ukrainian: Володимир Дмитрович Лучаківський; 19 March 1838 – 11 April 1903) was a Ukrainian public figure, writer, translator, lawyer, and the first Ukrainian burgomaster of Ternopil. Doctor of Law (1867). Member of the Shevchenko Scientific Society (1902).

== Biography ==
Volodymyr Luchakivskyi was born on 19 March 1838 in Remeniv (Kaminka-Strumylova Powiat, Kingdom of Galicia and Lodomeria, Austrian Empire, now Lviv Raion, Lviv Oblast, Ukraine) into the family of Ukrainian Greek Catholic priest Dmytro Luchakivskyi and his wife Antonina Dolnytska. As a young boy, he moved with his parents to Dovzhanka in Ternopil Raion, where his father was a parish priest.

After graduating from Ternopil (Classical) Gymnasium, he studied at the Faculty of Law of the University of Lviv. At the age of 24, he became the only Ukrainian lawyer in Ternopil.

In 1896, he became the first Ukrainian burgomaster of Ternopil. It was under Luchakivskyi that Ternopil saw the introduction of electric lighting, telephones, and water supply systems.

On 16 September 1900, he participated in the inauguration of the new premises of the Ternopil Higher Real School.

He was a co-organizer of Ukrainian societies in the city: "Mishchanske Bratstvo", "Ruska Besida", "Pryyateli Muzyky", and a branch of the "Ridna Shkola" society.

As burgomaster, he met with Ivan Franko and Solomiya Krushelnytska, involving them in the cultural life of Ternopil. In 1887, he organized an ethnographic exhibition in Ternopil.

Volodymyr Luchakivskyi died on 11 April 1903. He was buried in Ternopil at the Mykulynetskyi Cemetery.

== Creativity ==
Volodymyr Luchakivskyi was actively involved in literary creativity. For the amateur theater "Ruska Besida", he translated about 20 plays from German and Polish, which at one time were the main repertoire of Ukrainian theater in Galicia.

He wrote two original comedies, "Ispyt Na Muzha" and "Nespodivani Muzhyky". He wrote poetry, short stories, and humorous sketches.

Translated the German "Criminal Code" into Ukrainian. Published "Prychynok Do Etnohrafii Halytskoho Podillia" (Ternopil, 1883).

== Honouring ==
A park (in Velyki Hai, Ternopil Raion) and one of the streets in Ternopil (where a memorial plaque has also been installed) are named in his honor.

== Bibliography ==
- Бойцун Л. Тернопіль у плині літ: Історико-краєзнавчі замальовки. — Тернопіль : Джура, 2003. — 392 с. — ISBN 966-8017-50-1.
- Володимир Лучаківський. В'язанка побажань для української молоді: Репринт видання 1885 року. — Тернопіль: Джура, 2013. — 52 с.
- Енциклопедія українознавства : Словникова частина : [в 11 т.] / Наукове товариство імені Шевченка ; гол. ред. проф., д-р Володимир Кубійович. — Париж — Нью-Йорк : Молоде життя, 1955–1995. — ISBN 5-7707-4049-3.
- Новіна М. Д-р Володимир Лучаківський // Шляхами Золотого Поділля: Регіональний збірник Тернопільщини. — Філядельфія; ПА, 1970. — Т. 2. — С. 213–214.
- Остап'юк Б. Давній Тернопіль: Історичні нариси, постаті, картини. — Маямі; Торонто : Друк о.о. Василіян, 1984. — 208 с. — С. 16—17: Про В. Лучаківського.
- Сушкевич В. ... І підемо на вулицю Лучаківського: Ім'я першого бургомістра-українця повернулося на карту-схему Тернополя // Вільне життя. — 2002. — 15 серп.
- Шляхами Золотого Поділля: Регіональний іст.-мемуарний збірник Тернопільщини. — Філядельфія; ПА, 1983. — Т. 1. — 287 с. — С. 49; 213—214: Про В. Лучаківського.
- Шляхами Золотого Поділля: Тернопільщина і Скалатщина: Регіональний іст.-мемуарний збірник — Нью-Йорк; Париж; Сидней; Торонто, 1983. — Т. 3. — 845 с. — С. 66–67; 143; 603; 688: Про В. Лучаківського.
- Ювілейна книга Української гімназії в Тернополі 1898—1998: До сторіччя заснування / За ред. С. Яреми. — Тернопіль; Львів : НТШ; Львівське крайове товариство «Рідна школа», 1998. — 736 с. — С. 29; 40: Про В. Лучаківського.
