= Kameniari =

Poem by Ivan Franko

The Pioneers
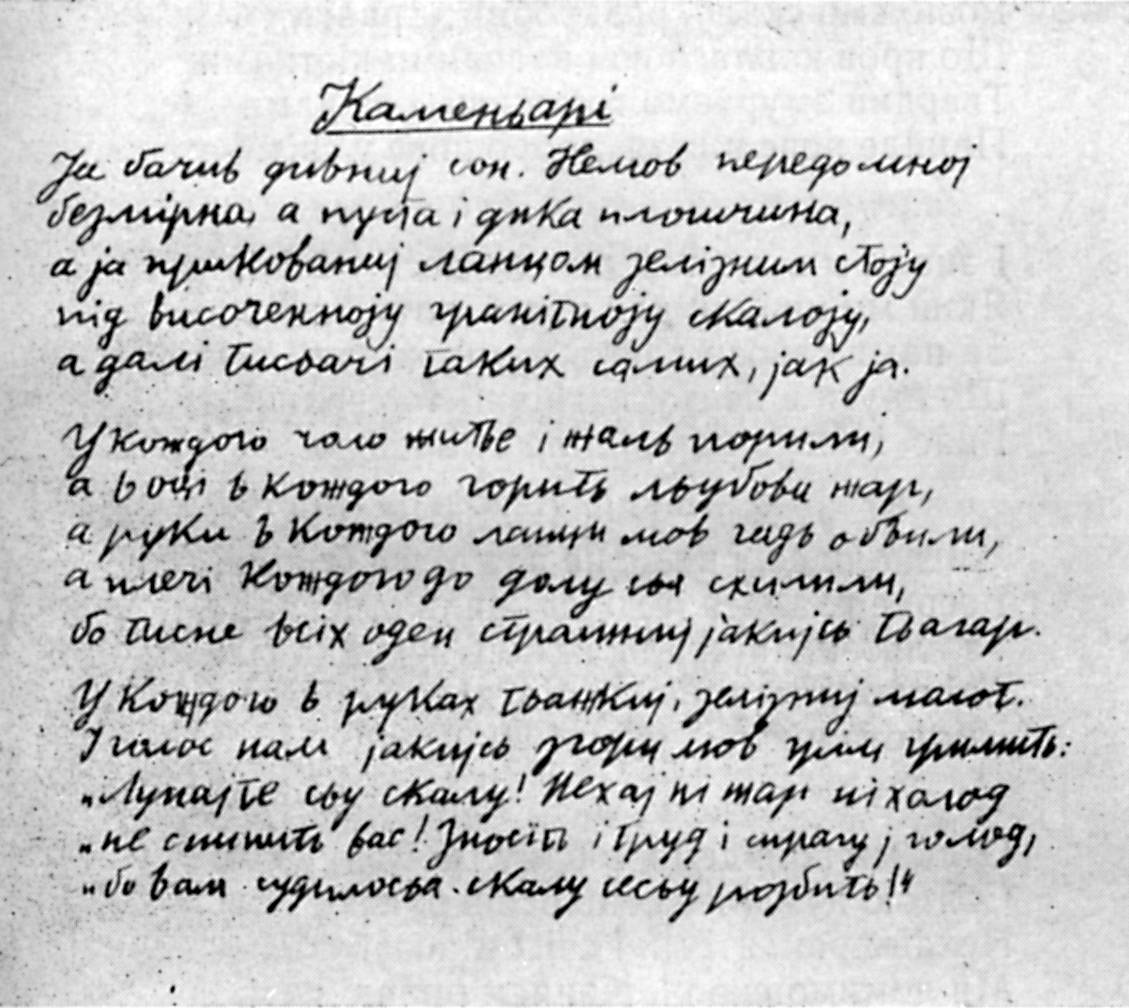
- Kameniari autograph
- Author: Ivan Franko
- Original title: Каменьарі
- Translator: Percival Cundy
- Language: Ukrainian
- Genre: Poem
- Publisher: Dzvin Almanac (in Ukrainian); The Ukrainian Weekly (in English)
- Publication date: 1878
- Publication place: Austria-Hungary; USA
- English publication date: 1946

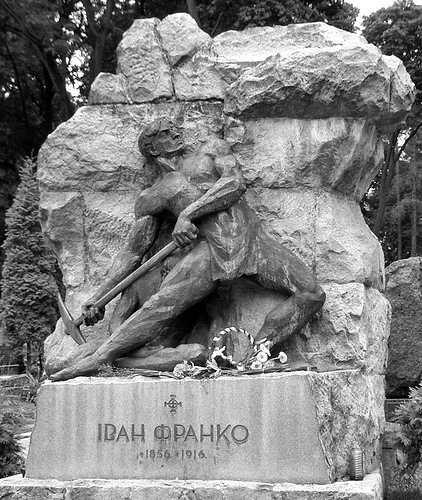
Monument to Ukrainian poet Ivan Franko, depicting a stone breaker (kameniar)

"Kameniari" (Ukrainian: Каменярі, lit. ''The Stonecutters", "The Stone-hewers''), is a poem by Ukrainian poet Ivan Franko (1856–1916). In this poem, slaves bound by chains smash through rock using sledgehammers. Written in 1878 as one of the author's first works, the poem is allegorical, describing the twin ideas of liberation from an oppressive past (Polish, Russian and Austro-Hungarian rule of Ukraine) and of the laying down of a highway for future social progress by pioneers.

The eponymous kameniar (Ukrainian: каменяр) is a quarry stonecutter, or quarryman. The stone breaker became a revolutionary symbol in Ukrainian and Soviet culture as well as a metaphorical name for Ivan Franko himself.

== Text ==
Ukrainian original	English translation (by Vera Rich)
Я бачив дивний сон. Немов передо мною Безмiрна, та пуста, i дика площина I я, прикований ланцем залiзним, стою Пiд височенною гранiтною скалою, А далi тисячi таких самих, як я.	I saw a wondrous dream. It seemed as if before me A wild and empty plain all boundlessly did lie, And I, with a great chain of iron fettered sorely, Stood ’neath a lofty crag of granite, towering o’er me, And there were others, many thousand-fold, as I.
У кожного чоло життя i жаль порили, I в оцi кожного горить любовi жар, I руки в кожного ланцi, мов гадь, обвили, I плечi кожного додолу ся схилили, Бо давить всiх один страшний якийсь тягар.	Life and its griefs had furrowed deep on every visage, But in the eyes of each a fire of love yet glowed, And round the arms of each were chains like serpents twisted, The shoulders of each man were drooping, bowed and listless, For each and all were weighted down by a dead load.
У кожного в руках тяжкий залiзний молот, I голос сильний нам згори, як грiм, гримить: "Лупайте сю скалу! Нехай нi жар, нi холод Не спинить вас! Зносiть i труд, i спрагу, й голод, Бо вам призначено скалу сесю розбить".	A heavy iron hammer each of us was holding, A voice on high, like thunder, thundered mightily; “Smite at the rock! Deterred neither by heat nor coldness! Endure your labours, bear your thirst and hunger boldly, To smash these cliffs to fragments is your destiny!”
I всi ми, як один, пiдняли вгору руки, I тисяч молотiв о камiнь загуло, I в тисячнi боки розприскалися штуки Та вiдривки скали; ми з силою розпуки Раз по раз гримали о кам'яне чоло.	Together one and all, raising our arms on high, we Struck, and a thousand hammers sounded forth their note. And on a thousand sides hurled shards and splinters flying, We clove the crags apart. With forces ever vying, Upon the rock-face time and time again we smote.
Мов водопаду рев, мов битви гук кривавий, Так нашi молоти гримiли раз у раз; I п'ядь за п'ядею ми мiсця здобували; Хоч не одного там калiчили тi скали, Ми далi йшли, нiщо не спинювало нас.	Like roar of waterfall, like sound of bloody battle, So our hammers thundered, time and time again, Span by span a foothold from the rock we grappled; Though not a few upon the crags were maimed and shattered, We still went on, a march that nothing could restrain.
I кожний з нас те знав, що слави нам не буде, Нi пам'ятi в людей за сей кривавий труд, Що аж тодi пiдуть по сiй дорозi люди, Як ми проб'єм її та вирiвняєм всюди, Як нашi костi тут пiд нею зогниють.	And each of us knew well; not unto us the glory, That men would not remember this our blood-soaked toil, When on this road mankind would move in endless story, Where we had hewn a road, and everywhere smoothed o’er it, Where underfoot our bones would crumble in the soil.
Та слави людської зовсiм ми не бажали, Бо не герої ми i не богатирi. Нi, ми невольники, хоч добровiльно взяли На себе пута. Ми рабами волi стали: На шляху поступу ми лиш каменярi.	And yet for human glory we were not aspiring. We were not heroes bold, nor doughty knights of yore. No, we were slaves, but slaves who at their own desiring Put on their chains. For slavery to freedom binds us! On the road’s progress we are stone-hewers, no more!
I всi ми вiрили, що своїми руками Розiб'ємо скалу, роздробимо гранiт, Що кров'ю власною i власними кiстками Твердий змуруємо гостинець i за нами Прийде нове життя, добро нове у свiт.	And all of us believed that by our endeavour Of might and main we’d cleave the granite, smash the scree; By our own lifeblood and by our own bones we’d sever A mighty highway, in our wake would follow ever Along it a new life, new good would come to be.
I знали ми, що там далеко десь у свiтi, Який ми кинули для працi, поту й пут, За нами сльози ллють мами, жiнки i дiти, Що други й недруги, гнiвнiї та сердитi, I нас, i намiр наш, i дiло те кленуть.	And all of us knew well, in the far world beyond us, Which we had left abandoned for toil and sweat and chains, The tears of mothers, wives and children deeply mourned us, That friend and enemy in rage and anger scorned us, Cursed us and our intent, our labour and our aim.
Ми знали се, i в нас не раз душа болiла, I серце рвалося, i груди жаль стискав; Та сльози, анi жаль, нi бiль пекучий тiла, Анi прокляття нас не вiдтягли вiд дiла, I молота нiхто iз рук не випускав.	We knew this, and full often the soul ached within us, The heart was torn, the breast grew tight with grief; but woe And tears and burning ache of body failed to wring us, Nor could curses ever from our labours win us, And no one from his hands let hammer fall and go.
Отак ми всi йдемо, в одну громаду скутi Святою думкою, а молоти в руках. Нехай проклятi ми i свiтом позабутi! Ми ломимо скалу, рiвняєм правдi путi, I щастя всiх прийде по наших аж кiстках.	Thus one and all we march, one concourse forged together, With hammer in our hands, a holy thought we own, Though we be cursed, though men forget our great endeavour, We’ll smash the rocks, for truth we’ll smooth the highway ever, And happiness shall come to all, though on our bones.

== See also ==
- 2428 Kamenyar, an asteroid of an asteroid belt that is classified as a minor planet and was discovered by the Russian astronomer Nikolai Chernykh in 1977 who was working at the Crimean Astrophysical Observatory
