= Vysloboky =

Rural locality in Lviv Oblast, Ukraine

Vysloboky Вислобоки
- Location in Lviv Oblast
- Coordinates: 49°56′27″N 24°10′47″E
- Country: Ukraine
- Oblast: Lviv Oblast
- Raion: Lviv Raion
- Hromada: Zhovtantsi rural hromada
- Time zone: UTC+2 (EET)
  - Summer (DST): UTC+3 (EEST)
- Postal code: 80460

Vysloboky (Ukrainian: Вислобоки) is a village in the Zhovtantsi rural hromada of the Lviv Raion of Lviv Oblast in Ukraine.

== History ==
On 19 July 2020, as a result of the administrative-territorial reform and liquidation of the Kamianka-Buzka Raion, the village became part of the Lviv Raion.

== Religion ==
- Church of the Immaculate Conception of the Mother of God (1762, wooden)

== Notable residents ==
- Vasyl Shchurat (1871–1948), Ukrainian teacher, literary critic, poet and translator

== Sources ==
- "Wisłoboki". Geographical Dictionary of the Kingdom of Poland (in Polish). 13. Warszawa: Kasa im. Józefa Mianowskiego. 1893. p. 602.
