= Marianna Dushar =

Ukrainian anthropologist and food writer

- Маріанна Душар
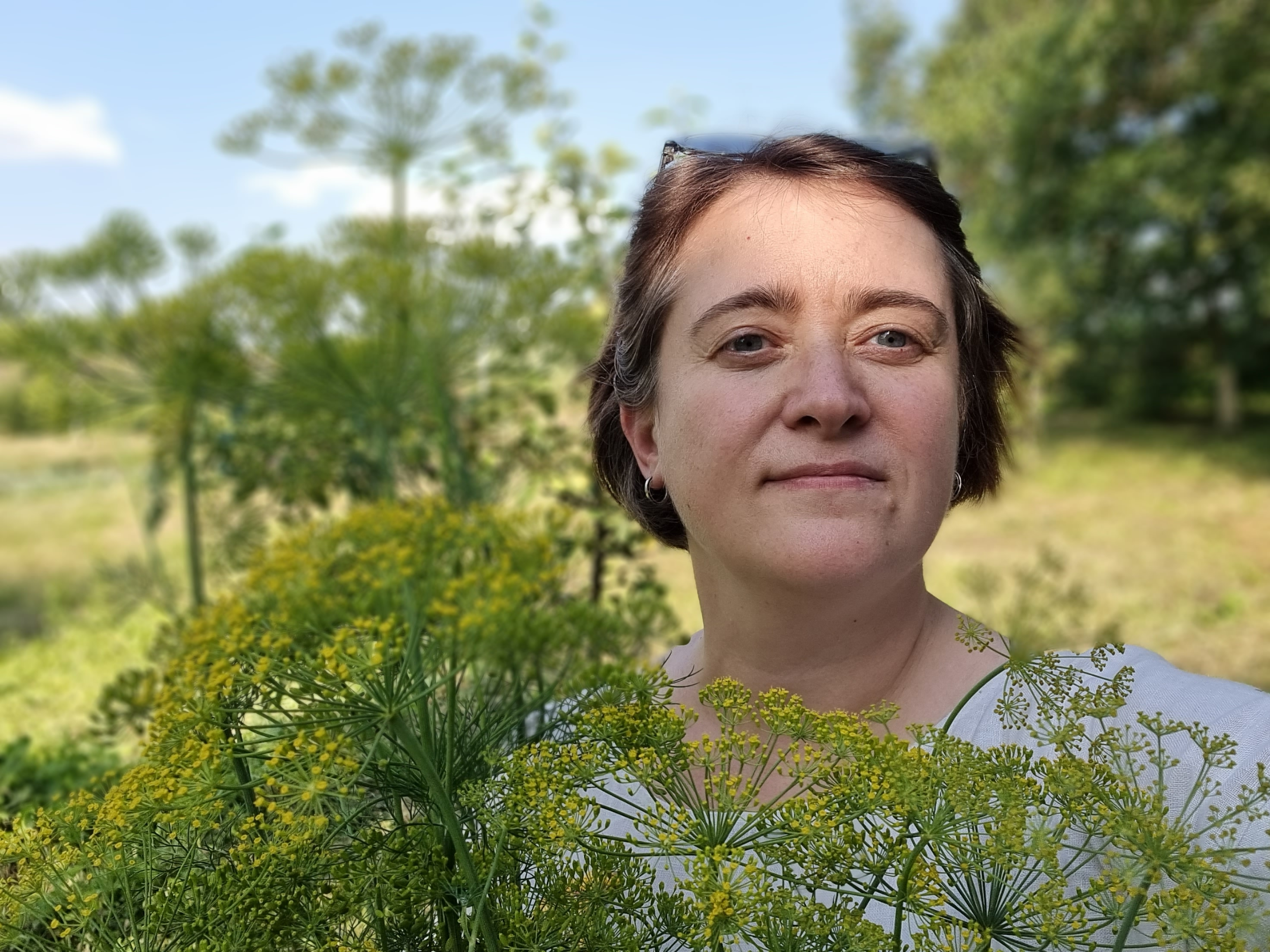
- Marianna Dushar (July 2023)
- Born: Lviv, Ukraine
- Education: University of Lviv
- Occupations: Anthropologist, food writer
- Writing career
- Pen name: Pani Stefa
- Language: Ukrainian
- Subject: Ukrainian culinary history
- Website: panistefa.com seedsandroots.net

Marianna Ihorivna Dushar (Ukrainian: Маріанна Ігорівна Душар) is a Ukrainian anthropologist and food writer, who specialises in the culinary heritage of the Halychyna region in central Europe.

== Biography ==
Dushar is from Lviv. She earned degrees from Lviv University in Biology and Biophysics. Her post-graduate research focussed on Ukrainian cuisine, with a particular focus on the food of Halychyna. She has argued for greater recognition of the potential for gastro-tourism of local food cultures in Ukraine. She has also argued that Galician cuisine has a particular quality due to the successive waves of migration to the region from across Europe. She also works to collect and publish historic recipes from the region, in order to facilitate resurgence in the region's culinary heritage. She also researches the culinary traditions of Ukrainian diaspora communities.

In 2019, Dushar was awarded a Fulbright Scholarship for a research project entitled, 'Reclaiming Ukraine's Gastronomic Traditions: More Than Just Borscht and Varenyky. The project was based in the Department of Social Anthropology in the Ethnology Institute of National Academy of Sciences of Ukraine. She also works on the history of borscht, and supported its inclusion as part of the UNESCO listing of Ukraine's intangible cultural heritage.

Dushar has co-authored several books, widening appreciation of the works of other writers, such as the novelist Sofia Andrukhovych, Daria Tsvek, Olha Franko, amongst others. Her recipe for mushroom and gherkin soup appeared in Summer Kitchens by Olia Hercules. She also writes under the pseudonym Pani Stefa, which she also used as the name for her blog.

In response to the 2022 Russian invasion of Ukraine, Dushar published a recipe for Molotov cocktails on her blog.

== Selected publications ==
- У будні і свята - On High Days and Holidays (Видавництво Старого Лева, 2016)
- Галицькі смаколики: кулінарний записник [Halyt︠s︡ʹki Smakolyky: Kulinarnyĭ Zapysnyk] - Galician Delicacies: a Culinary Notebook (Vydavnyt︠s︡tvo Staroho Leva, 2019)
- 1-ша українська загально-практична кухня - 1st Ukrainian Practical Cuisine (2019)
- Львівська кухня - Lviv Cuisine (Folio Distribution, 2020)
