= Remeniv =

Rural locality in Lviv Oblast, Ukraine

Remeniv Ременів
- Location in Lviv Oblast Remeniv (Ukraine)
- Coordinates: 49°57′13″N 24°12′25″E
- Country: Ukraine
- Oblast: Lviv Oblast
- Raion: Lviv Raion
- Hromada: Zhovtantsi rural hromada
- Time zone: UTC+2 (EET)
  - Summer (DST): UTC+3 (EEST)
- Postal code: 80460

Remeniv (Ukrainian: Ременів) is a village in the Zhovtantsi rural hromada of the Lviv Raion of Lviv Oblast in Ukraine.

== History ==
The first written mention of the village was in 1399.

The tax register for 1515 documents a priest in the village (meaning that there was already a church at that time) and 1 lan (about 25 hectares) of cultivated land, 3 lan (about 75 hectares) of cultivated land leased by Tustanovsky and another 3 lan temporarily vacant, and 3 lan (about 75 hectares) of cultivated land leased by Kukharskyi and a mill.

On 19 July 2020, as a result of the administrative-territorial reform and liquidation of the Kamianka-Buzka Raion, the village became part of the Lviv Raion.

== Religion ==
- Synaxis of the Theotokos church (1908)

== Notable residents ==
- Volodymyr Luchakivskyi (1838–1903), Ukrainian public figure, writer, translator, lawyer, and the first Ukrainian burgomaster of Ternopil
- Roman Sushko (1894–1944), Ukrainian officer and politician who served on the Provid, or the leadership council, of the Organisation of Ukrainian Nationalists (OUN) and later the Melnykite faction. He also cofounded its predecessor, the Ukrainian Military Organisation (UVO)

== Bibliography ==
- "Remenów". Geographical Dictionary of the Kingdom of Poland (in Polish). 9. Warszawa: Kasa im. Józefa Mianowskiego. 1888. p. 612.
- Іван Фур. Ременів, село моєї молодости і праци. — Парма, Огайо, 1991. — 178 с.
