= Petro Franko =

Ukrainian author, teacher, scientist, politician and armed forces leader

Petro Ivanovych Franko
- Петро Іванович Франко
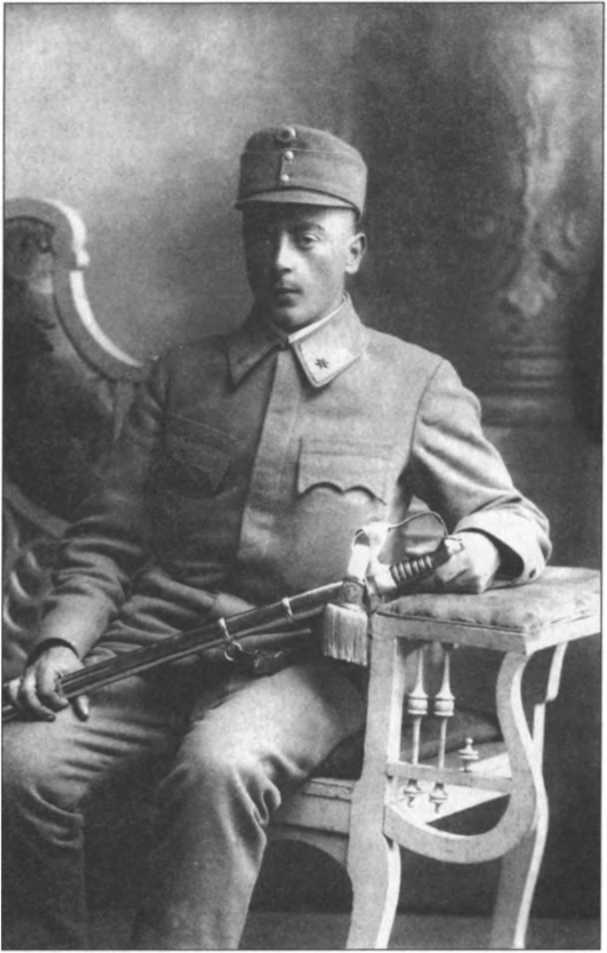
- Petro Franko in a uniform of Ukrainian Sich Riflemen
- Born: 21 June 1890; Nahuievychi, Austria-Hungary
- Died: 6 July 1941 (aged 51); Kyiv, Ukrainian SSR
- Occupations: Scientist, writer, and politician
- Spouse: Olha Franko

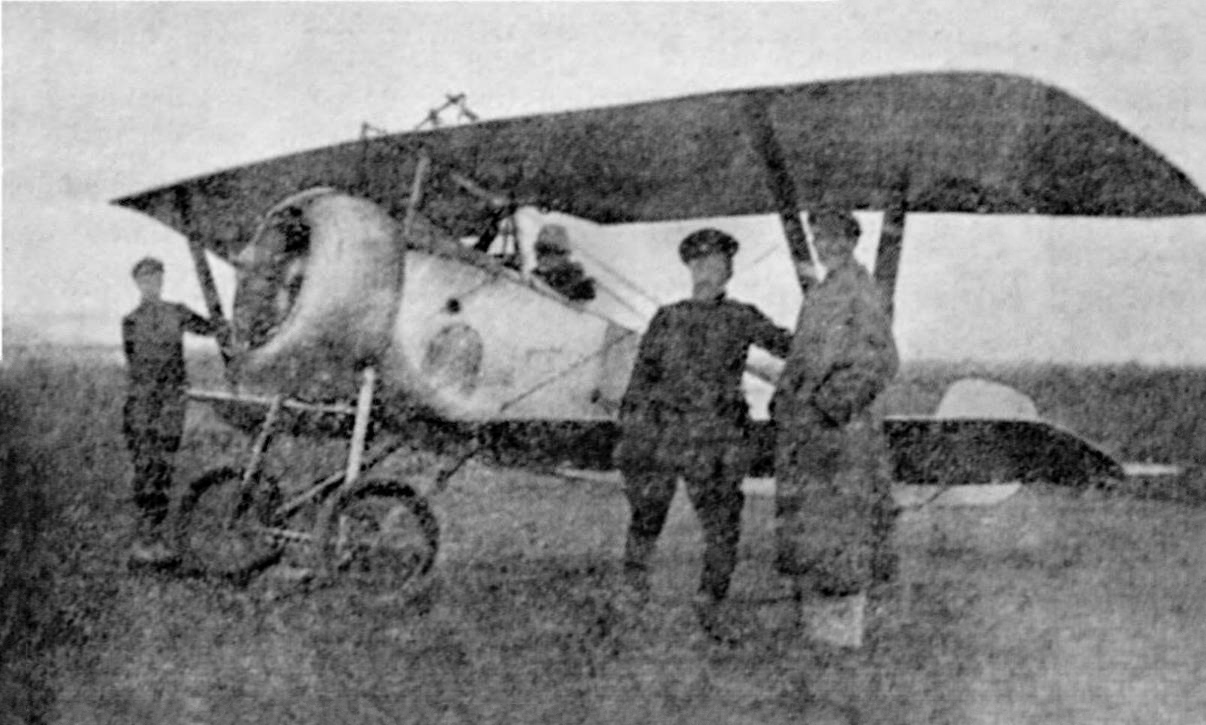
Airplane of the Ukrainian Galician Army

Petro Ivanovych Franko (Ukrainian: Петро Іванович Франко; 21 June 1890 – 6 July 1941) was a Ukrainian educator, pedagogue, writer, ethnographer, scientist, military leader, and politician. Franko was a co-founder of the Plast, a Ukrainian Scouting Organization, and member of the Shevchenko Scientific Society.

== Biography ==
=== Early life and education ===
Franko was born to Ukrainian writer Ivan Franko and his wife Olha (née Khoruzhynska) in Nahuievychi of Drohobych powiat (Kingdom of Galicia and Lodomeria) on 21 June 1890.

He graduated from the Lviv Polytechnic Institute.

He completed training as a pilot in 1916 at the flight school in Railovac, near Sarajevo.

=== Career ===
Until World War I Franko was a teacher in a Ukrainian gymnasium in Lemberg. In 1911-1912 he created scouting groups for boys and girls in his establishment, which became part of the wider Plast movement. The name of the organization was proposed by Franko himself, who was inspired by stories about plastuns, a branch of Kuban Cossacks. In 1913 he published the book Plast games (Пластові ігри та забави). In the same year Franko organized the first congress of Plast educators.

From 1914 Franko served as a poruchik (Lieutenant) in the Ukrainian Sich Riflemen where commanded a company (sotnia). In 1918, he organized an aviation school of the Ukrainian Galician Army Command Center, which was active until 1920.

Franko later worked as a teacher in Kolomyia, then part of Second Polish Republic. Following the crackdown of Polish authorities on Ukrainian scouting, in 1929 he established an underground group of Plast. This led to Franko's expulsion from the school in the following year, after which he moved to Lviv. From 1931 to 1936 he worked as a chemical engineer in the scientific-research institute in Kharkiv (Soviet Union). During that time, Franko became an author of 36 patented inventions. Before World War II, he lectured at the Lwow trade-economic institute, as well as in the nearby city of Jaworow. In 1940, he was elected as a deputy to the Ukrainian Soviet Socialist Republic's Verkhovna Rada.

With the start of Operation Barbarossa (part of World War II) in June 1941, Franko was detained by Soviet authorities and transported out of Lviv.

=== Death ===
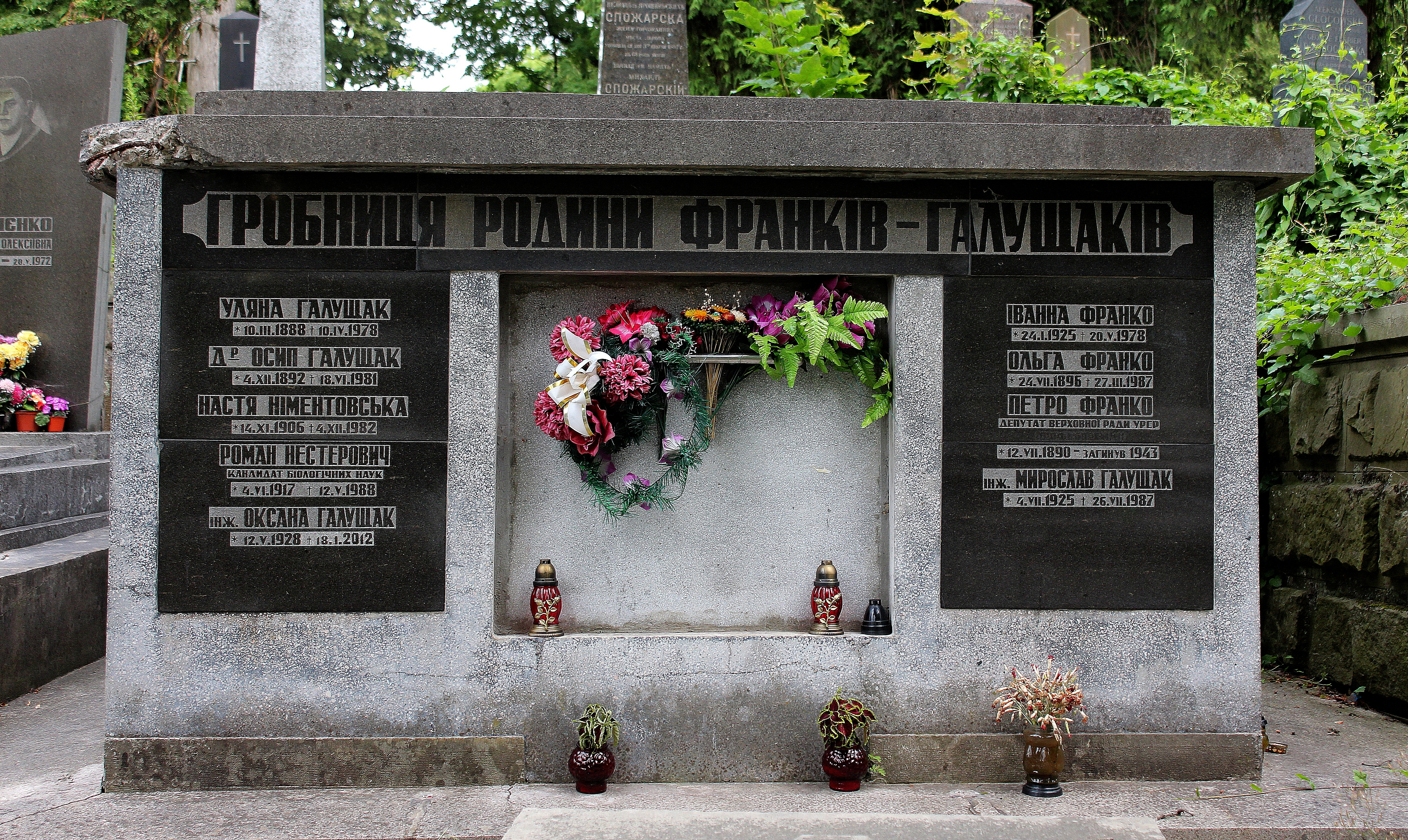
Franko-Halushchak family tomb. Lychakiv Cemetery, field No. 69.

Franko died under unknown circumstances. Some sources claim that was killed on 28 June 1941 during his attempt to escape at the Proshov railway station near Ternopil while being transported by train. Another sources claim that he was murdered by NKVD operatives in the summer months of the same year.

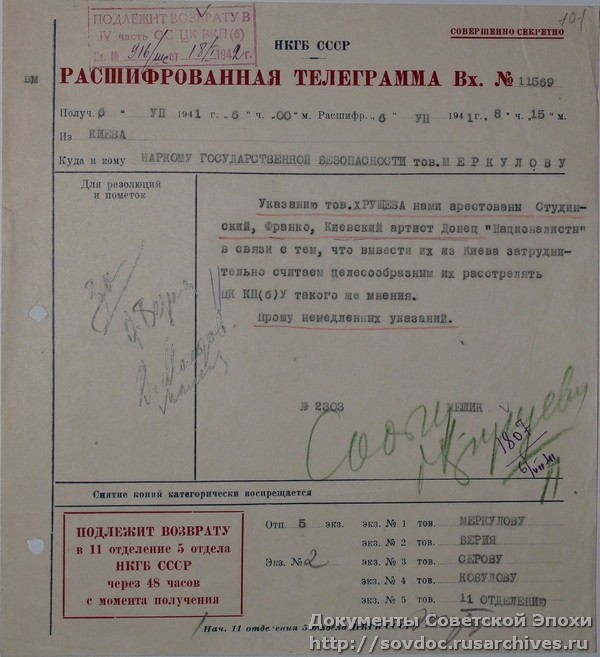
the NKVD encrypted telegram regarding the request for the shooting of Studynsky, Franko and Donets

In 2015 an encrypted NKVD telegram dated with 6 July 1941 was published by archivists:

"To the instructions of Comrade Khrushchev we arrested Studynsky, Franko, Kyiv artist Mykhailo Donets, "Nationalists"; due to the fact that it is difficult to get them out of Kyiv, we consider it advisable to shoot them. The Central Committee of the Communist Party of Ukraine (b) has the same opinion".

== Legacy ==
In 2011, the Lviv regional council posthumously awarded Franko with the "90th anniversary of the proclamation of the Western Ukrainian People's Republic" award.

In the city of Starokostiantyniv, at the entrance to the 7th Aviation Brigade on Myr Street, a portrait of Petro Franko, whose name the military unit bears, was painted on a concrete slab.

On August 24, 2020, on the Independence Day of Ukraine, a mural dedicated to Petro Franko was unveiled in Kyiv's Solomianskyi District, on the facade of a building at 7 Aviakonstruktora Antonova Street.

On the occasion of the 130th anniversary of the birth of Petro Franko and the Day of the Defender of Ukraine, on October 14, 2020, the first monument to Petro Franko was unveiled on the square of the Ivan Franko Literary and Memorial Museum in Nahuyevychi.

On 27 October 2020 a Plast kurin in Valencia, Spain, was named after Petro Franko. In the following year a Plast schooling centre named in his honour was founded in Vynnyky.

The 2024 biographical film Another Franko is based on the life of Franko and features Franko's voice, digitized from video archives.

== Works ==
He was the author of several books, including the historical novellas Makhnivska Popivna (Махнівська попівна), In ancient woods of Brazil (В пралісах Бразилії), memoirs Ivan Franko from up close (Іван Франко зблизька), a movie script of Boryslav Laughs (Борислав сміється) and others.

== Family ==
Franko was married twice, the second time to culinary writer, Olha Franko, who authored one of the first Ukrainian culinary books. He had two daughters, Vira and Ivanna, who liveв with their children in Kyiv.
