= Josef Zastyretz =

Ukrainian historian, priest, writer (1873–1943)

- Йосип Застирець
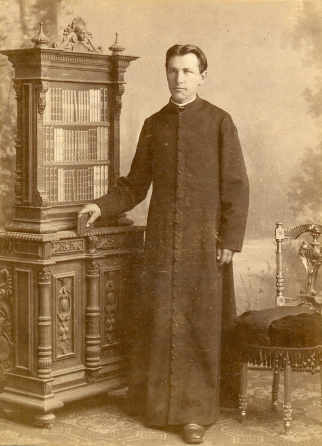
- Born: Yosyp Yakovych Zastyrets; 15 August 1873 khutir of Romantsi, near Koniushkiv, Austria-Hungary (now Ukraine)
- Died: 15 January 1943 (aged 69); Lviv
- Education: Lviv Theological Seminary, Lviv University

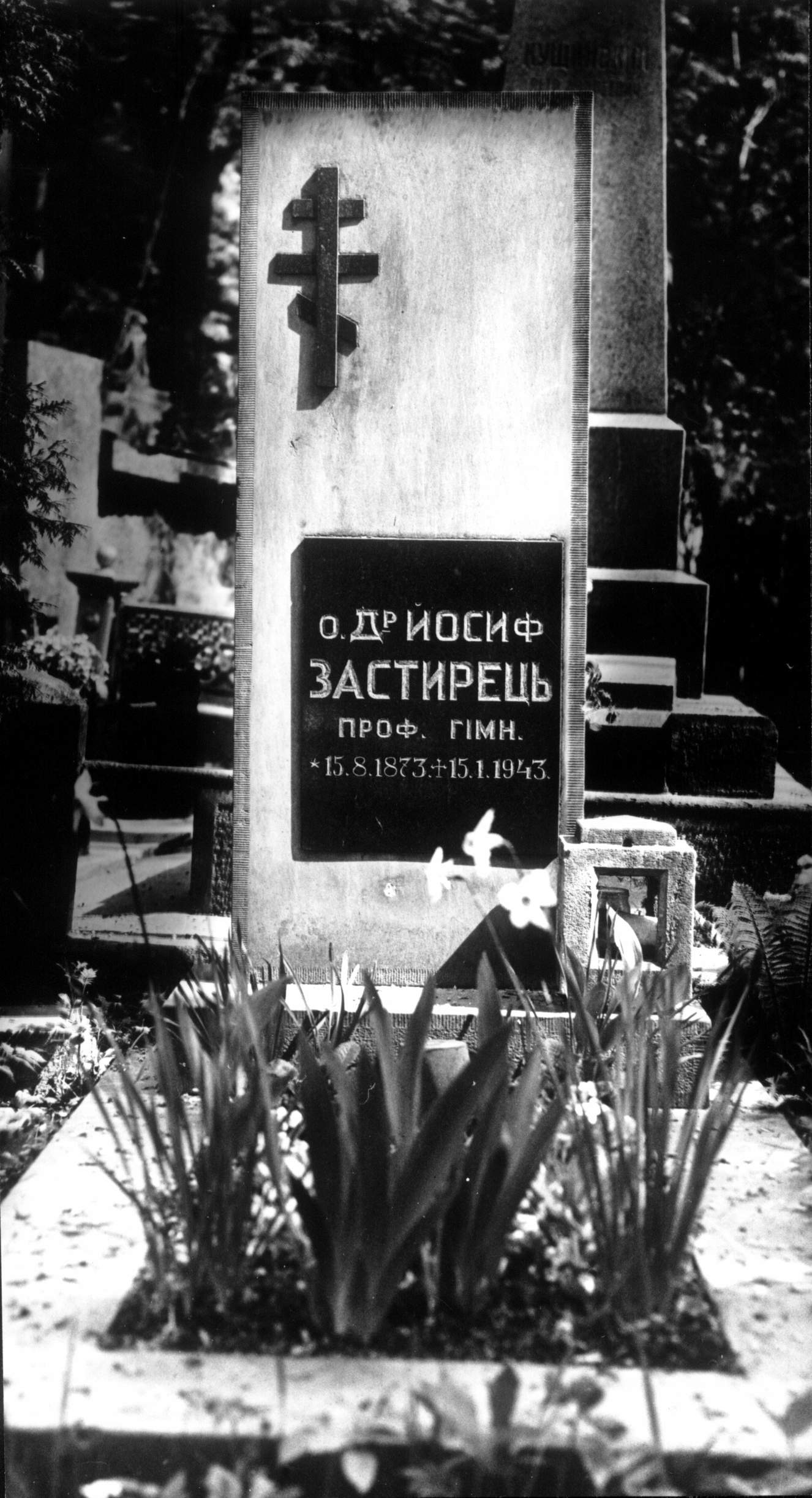
The grave of Josef Zastyretz at the Lychakiv Cemetery

Josef Zastyretz (Ukrainian: Йосип Якович Застирець, romanized: Yosyp Yakovych Zastyrets; 15 August 1873 – 15 January 1943) is a Ukrainian historian, priest, writer. He earned a Doctor of Philosophy degree in 1914.

== Biography ==
Yosyp Zastyrets was born on 15 August 1873 in the khutir of Romantsi, near Koniushkiv, now Brody urban hromada of the Zolochiv Raion of Lviv Oblast in Ukraine.

He studied at the Brody Gymnasium, Lviv Theological Seminary, and Lviv University. In 1898 he was ordained a priest.

In 1900–1914, he worked as a catechist, teacher of history, German, and Ukrainian at Berezhany, Lviv (academic and Polish), and Ternopil gymnasiums. In Lviv, he was the head of the Prosvita reading room and the Ridna Shkola circle.

In Vienna, he initiated the installation of a memorial plaque on the house where Panteleimon Kulish and Ivan Puluj lived and translated the Bible into Ukrainian.

He founded the Princess Yaroslavna Women's Society in Ternopil, which in 1910 republished the collection Rusalka Dnistrova on the occasion of the 100th anniversary of Markiian Shashkevych's birth.

In November 1915, the Viennese professor, Doctor of Philosophy Josef Zastyretz, nominated Ivan Franko for the Nobel Prize.

He died on 15 January 1943 in Lviv, where he was buried at the Lychakiv Cemetery.
