= Vyriv =

Vyriv Вирів
- Village
- Location of Vyriv in Ukraine Vyriv (Ukraine)
- Coordinates: 49°59′16″N 24°21′37″E
- Country: Ukraine
- Oblast: Lviv Oblast
- Raion: Lviv Raion

Area
  - Total: 0.75 km^{2} (0.29 sq mi)
- Elevation: 228 m (748 ft)

Population
  - Total: 279
  - Density: 370/km^{2} (960/sq mi)
- Time zone: UTC+4 (MSK)
- Postal code: 80441
- Area code: +380 3254

Vyriv (Ukrainian: Вирів) is a village in Lviv Raion, Lviv Oblast, Ukraine.

As of the 2001 Ukrainian Census, its population was 360

== Demography ==
According to the 2001 census, the majority of the population (99.72) spoke Ukrainian.
