= Ivan Franko =

Ukrainian poet and writer (1856–1916)

- Іван Якович Франко
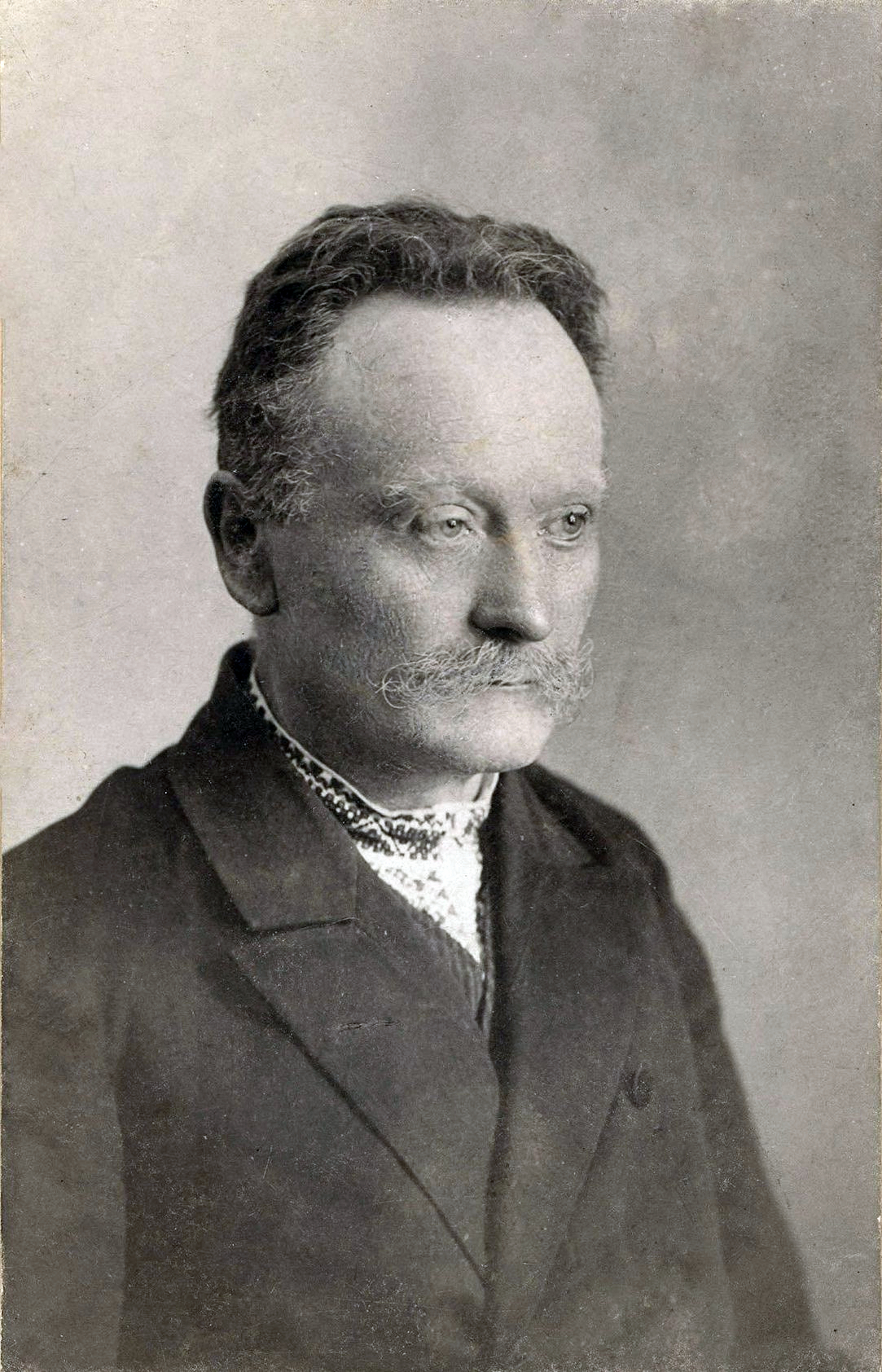
- Franko in 1910
- Born: 27 August 1856; Nahuievychi, Austrian Empire (now Ukraine)
- Died: 28 May 1916 (aged 59); Lemberg, Austria-Hungary (now Lviv, Ukraine)
- Resting place: Lychakiv Cemetery
- Education: Franz-Josephs-Universität Czernowitz; University of Vienna (PhD, 1893)
- Occupations: poet, writer, political activist
- Spouse: Olha Fedorivna Khoruzhynska (m. 1886)
- Children: Andriy Franko; Petro Franko; Taras Franko; Hanna Klyuchko (Franko)
- Writing career
- Language: Ukrainian, Polish, German, Russian
- Period: 1874–1916
- Genres: epic poetry, short story, novels, drama
- Movements: Realism, Romanticism, Decadent movement

Ivan Yakovych Franko PhD (Ukrainian: Іван Якович Франко, pronounced [iˈwɑn ˈjɑkowɪtʃ frɐnˈkɔ]; 27 August 1856 – 28 May 1916) was a Ukrainian poet, writer, social and literary critic, journalist, translator, economist, political activist, ethnographer, and the author of the first detective novels and modern poetry in Ukrainian.

Franko was a political radical, and a founder of the socialist and nationalist movement in Western Ukraine. In addition to his own literary work, he also translated into Ukrainian the works of such renowned figures as William Shakespeare, Lord Byron, Pedro Calderón de la Barca, Dante Alighieri, Victor Hugo, Adam Mickiewicz, Johann Wolfgang von Goethe and Friedrich Schiller. His translations appeared on the stage of the Ruska Besida Theatre. Along with Taras Shevchenko, he has had a tremendous influence on modern literary and political thought in Ukraine.

== Biography ==
=== Early years ===
Franko was born in the Ukrainian village of Nahuievychi, then located in the Austrian kronland of Galicia, today part of Drohobych Raion, Lviv Oblast, Ukraine. As a child, he was baptized as Ivan by Father Yosyp Levytsky, known as a poet and the author of the first Galician-Ruthenian Hramatyka ("Grammar"), who was later exiled to Nahuievychi for a "sharp tongue". At home, however, Ivan was called Myron because of a local superstitious belief that naming a person by a different name will dodge death. Franko's family in Nahuievychi was considered "well-to-do", with their own servants and 24 hectares (59 acres) of owned property.

Franko's family possibly had German origins, being descendants of German colonists. Ivan Franko believed it to be true. That statement is also supported by Timothy Snyder who describes Yakiv Franko as a village blacksmith of German Roman Catholic descent. For certain the Franko family was already living in Galicia when the country was incorporated into Austria in 1772. Ivan Franko's great-grandfather Teodor (Fed) Franko baptized his children in the Greek Catholic church.

Franko's mother Maria came from a family of petty nobility. The Kulczyckis (or Kulchytskys) were an ancient noble family hailing from the village of Kulchytsi in the Sambir Raion. Her mother was Ludwika Kulczycka, a widow with six children from Yasenytsia Silna. Researchers describe Franko's mother's nationality as Polish or Ukrainian. The petty gentry in Eastern Galicia often retained elements of Polish culture and fostered a sense of solidarity with the Polish nobility, but they also Ruthenized and blended in with the surrounding peasantry. For example, Franko's uncle Ivan Kulczycki took part in the Polish uprising of 1863. Franko's distant relative, his aunt Koszycka, with whom he lived while studying in Drohobych, spoke Polish and Ruthenian.

Ivan Franko attended school in the village Yasenytsia Sylna from 1862 until 1864, and from there attended the Basilian monastic school in Drohobych until 1867. His father died before Ivan was able to graduate from the gymnasium (realschule), but his stepfather supported Ivan in continuing his education. Soon, however, Franko found himself completely without parents after his mother died as well and later the young Ivan stayed with totally unrelated people. In 1875, he graduated from the Drohobych Realschule, and continued on to Lviv University, where he studied classical philosophy, Ukrainian language and literature. It was at this university that Franko began his literary career, with various works of poetry and his novel Petriï i Dovbushchuky published by the students' magazine Druh (Friend), whose editorial board he would later join.

=== Socialist activism and imprisonment ===
An 1886 edition of Zoria magazine, to which Franko contributed

A meeting with Mykhailo Drahomanov at Lviv University made a huge impression on Ivan Franko. It later developed into a long political and literary association. Franko's own socialist writings and his association with Drahomanov led to his arrest in 1877, along with Mykhailo Pavlyk and Ostap Terletsky, among others. They were accused of belonging to a secret socialist organization, which did not in fact exist. However, the nine months in prison did not discourage his political writing or activities. In prison, Franko wrote the satire Smorhonska Akademiia (The Smorhon Academy). After release, he studied the works of Karl Marx and Friedrich Engels, contributed articles to the Polish newspaper Praca (Labor) and helped organize workers' groups in Lviv. In 1878 Franko and Pavlyk founded the magazine Hromadskyi Druh ("Public Friend"). Only two issues were published before it was banned by the government; however, the journal was reborn under the names Dzvin (Bell) and Molot (Mallet). Franko published a series of books called Dribna Biblioteka ("Petty Library") from 1878 until his second arrest for arousing the peasants to civil disobedience in 1880. After three months in the Kolomyia prison, the writer returned to Lviv. His impressions of this exile are reflected in his novel Na Dni (At the Bottom). Upon his release, Franko was kept under police surveillance. At odds with the administration, Franko was expelled from Lviv University, an institution that would be renamed Ivan Franko National University of Lviv after the writer's death.

Franko was an active contributor to the journal Svit (The World) in 1881. He wrote more than half of the material, excluding the unsigned editorials. Later that year, Franko moved to his native Nahuievychi, where he wrote the novel Zakhar Berkut, translated Goethe's Faust and Heine's poem Deutschland: ein Wintermärchen into Ukrainian. He also wrote a series of articles on Taras Shevchenko, and reviewed the collection Khutirna Poeziia (Khutir Poetry) by Panteleimon Kulish. Franko worked for the journal Zoria (Star), and became a member of the editing board of the newspaper Dilo (Action) a year later.

=== Marriage and engagement in politics ===
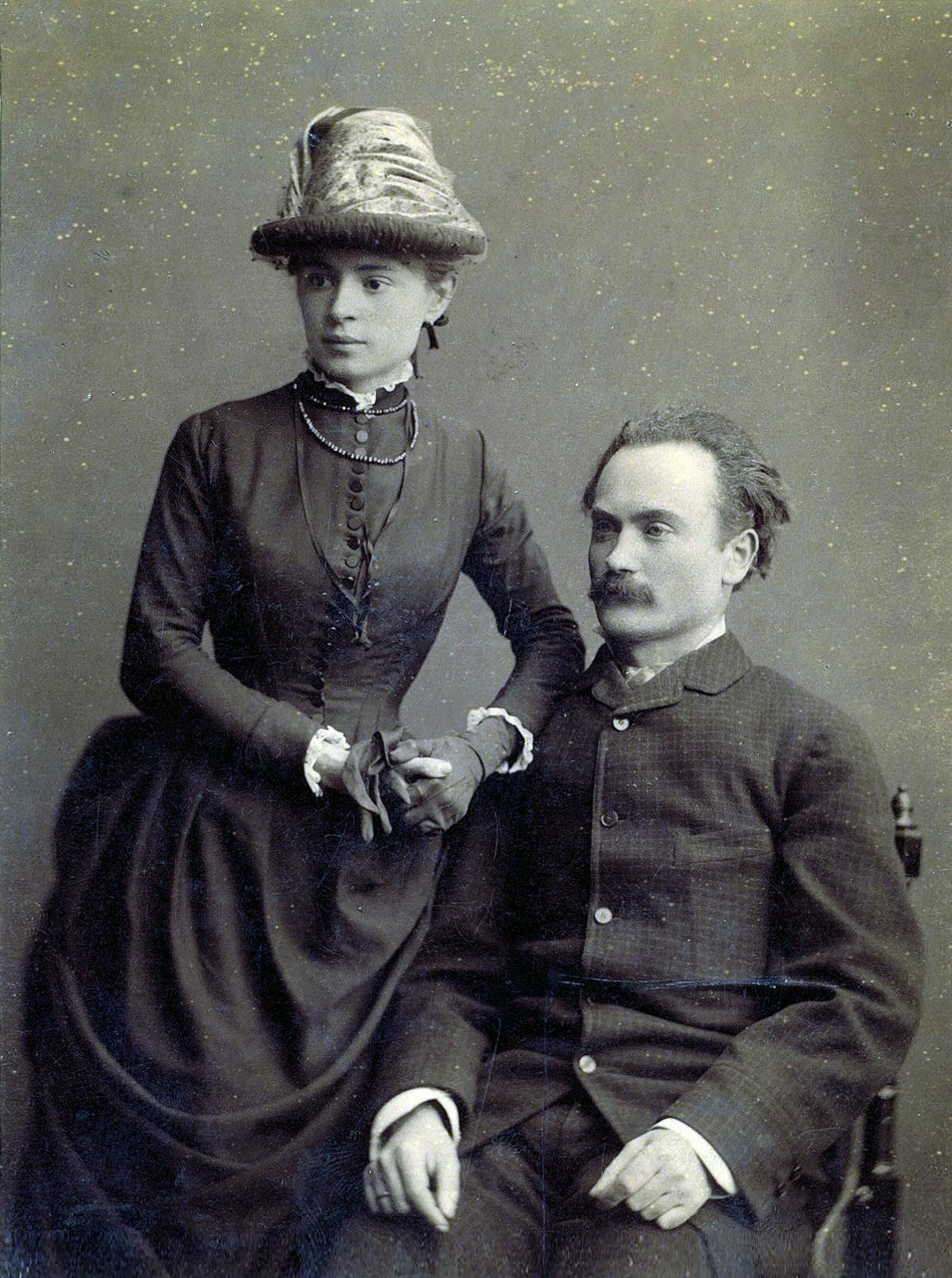
Franko with wife Olha Khoruzhynska, 1886

Franko married Olha Khoruzhynska from Kyiv in May 1886, to whom he dedicated the collection Z vershyn i nyzyn (From Tops and Bottoms), a book of poetry and verse. The couple lived in Vienna for some time, where Ivan Franko met with Theodor Herzl and Tomáš Garrigue Masaryk. His wife was to later suffer from a debilitating mental illness due to the death of the first-born son, Andriy, one of the reasons that Franko would not leave Lviv for treatment in Kyiv in 1916, shortly before his death.

In 1888, Franko was a contributor to the journal Pravda, which, along with his association with compatriots from Dnieper Ukraine, led to a third arrest in 1889. After this two-month prison term, he co-founded the Ruthenian-Ukrainian Radical Party with Mykhailo Drahomanov and Mykhailo Pavlyk. Franko was the Radical party's candidate for seats in the parliament of Austria and the Galicia Diet, but never won an election.

In 1891, Franko attended the Franz-Josephs-Universität Czernowitz (where he prepared a dissertation on Ivan Vyshensky), and then attended the University of Vienna to defend a doctoral dissertation on the spiritual romance Barlaam and Josaphat under the supervision of Vatroslav Jagić, who was considered the foremost expert of Slavic languages at the time. Franko received his doctorate of philosophy from University of Vienna on July 1, 1893. He was appointed lecturer in the history of Ukrainian literature at Lviv University in 1894; however, he was not able to chair the Department of Ukrainian literature there because of opposition from Vicegerent Kazimierz Badeni and Galician conservative circles.

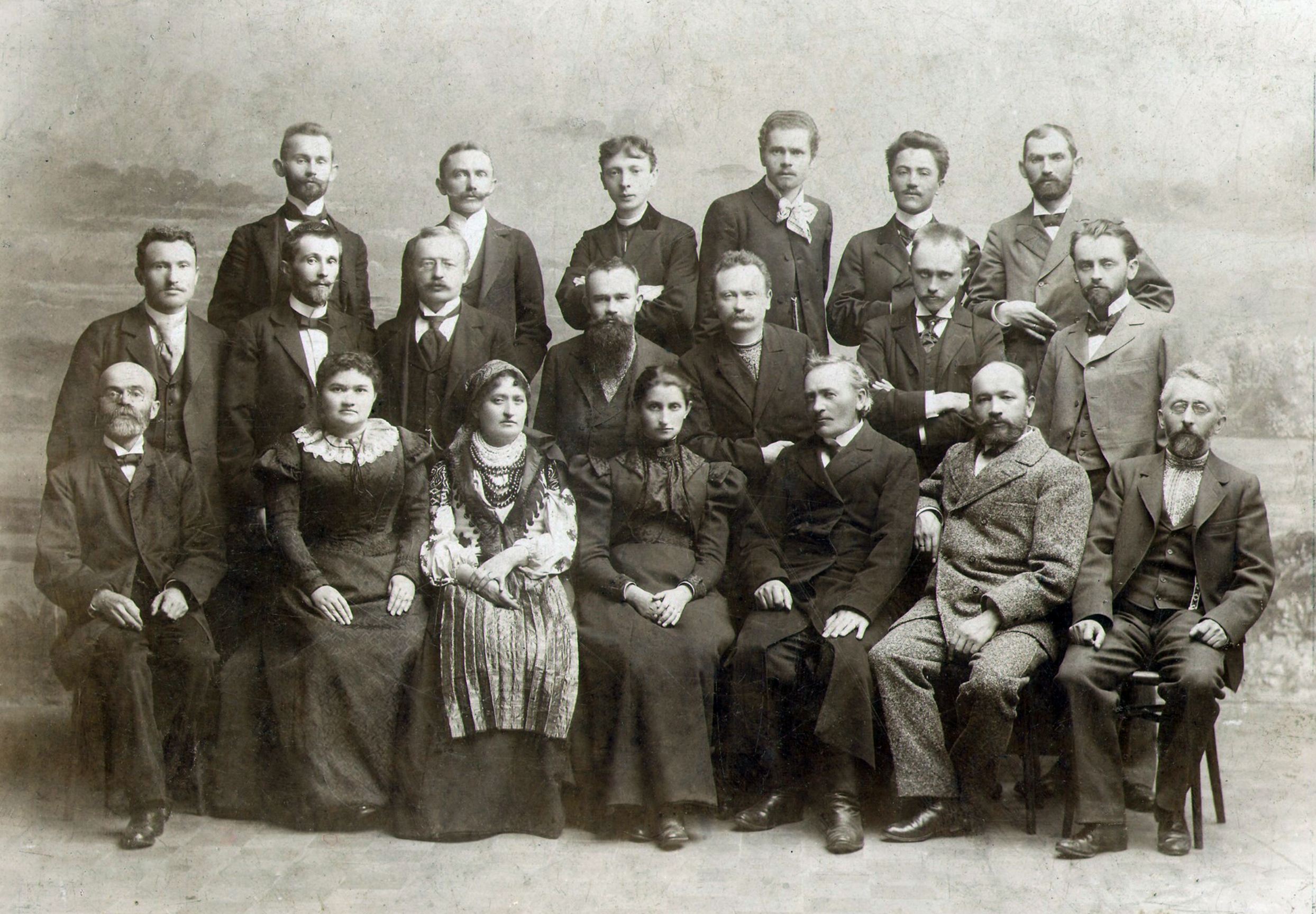
The board and members of the Shevchenko Scientific Society celebrating the 100th anniversary of the publication of Ivan Kotliarevsky's Eneida, Lviv, 31 October 1898: Sitting in the first row: Mykhaylo Pavlyk, Yevheniya Yaroshynska, Natalia Kobrynska, Olha Kobylianska, Sylvester Lepky, Andriy Chaykovsky, Kost Pankivsky. In the second row: Ivan Kopach, Volodymyr Hnatiuk, Osyp Makovej, Mykhailo Hrushevsky, Ivan Franko, Oleksander Kolessa, Bohdan Lepky. Standing in the third row: Ivan Petrushevych, Filaret Kolessa, Yossyp Kyshakevych, Ivan Trush, Denys Lukianovych, Mykola Ivasyuk.

One of Franko's articles, Sotsiializm i sotsiial-demokratyzm (Socialism and Social Democracy), a severe criticism of Ukrainian Social Democracy and the socialism of Marx and Engels, was published in 1898 in the journal Zhytie i Slovo, which he and his wife founded. He continued his anti-Marxist stance in a collection of poetry entitled Mii smarahd (My Emerald) in 1898, where he called Marxism "a religion founded on dogmas of hatred and class struggle". His long-time collaborative association with Mykhailo Drahomanov was strained due to their diverging views on socialism and the national question. Franko would later accuse Drahomanov of tying Ukraine's fate to that of Russia in Suspil'nopolitychni pohliady M. Drahomanova (The Sociopolitical Views of M. Drahomanov), published in 1906. After a split in the Radical Party, in 1899, Franko, together with the Lviv historian Mykhailo Hrushevsky, founded the National Democratic Party, where he worked until 1904 when he retired from political life.

=== Later career ===
In 1902, students and activists in Lviv, embarrassed that Franko was living in poverty, purchased a house for him in the city. He lived there for the remaining 14 years of his life. The house is now the site of the Ivan Franko Museum.

In 1904 Franko took part in an ethnographic expedition in the Boyko areas with Filaret Kolesa, Fedir Vovk, and a Russian ethnographer.

1914 saw publication of his jubilee collection, Pryvit Ivanovi Frankovi (Greeting Ivan Franko), and of his collection Iz lit moyeyi molodosti (From the Years of My Youth).

In the last nine years of his life, Franko seldom physically wrote, as he suffered from rheumatism which eventually paralyzed his right arm. He was assisted as amanuensis by his sons, particularly Andriy.

In 1916, Josef Zastyretz and Harald Hjärne proposed Franko for the 1916 Nobel Prize in Literature, but he died before the nomination materialized.

=== Illness, death and burial ===
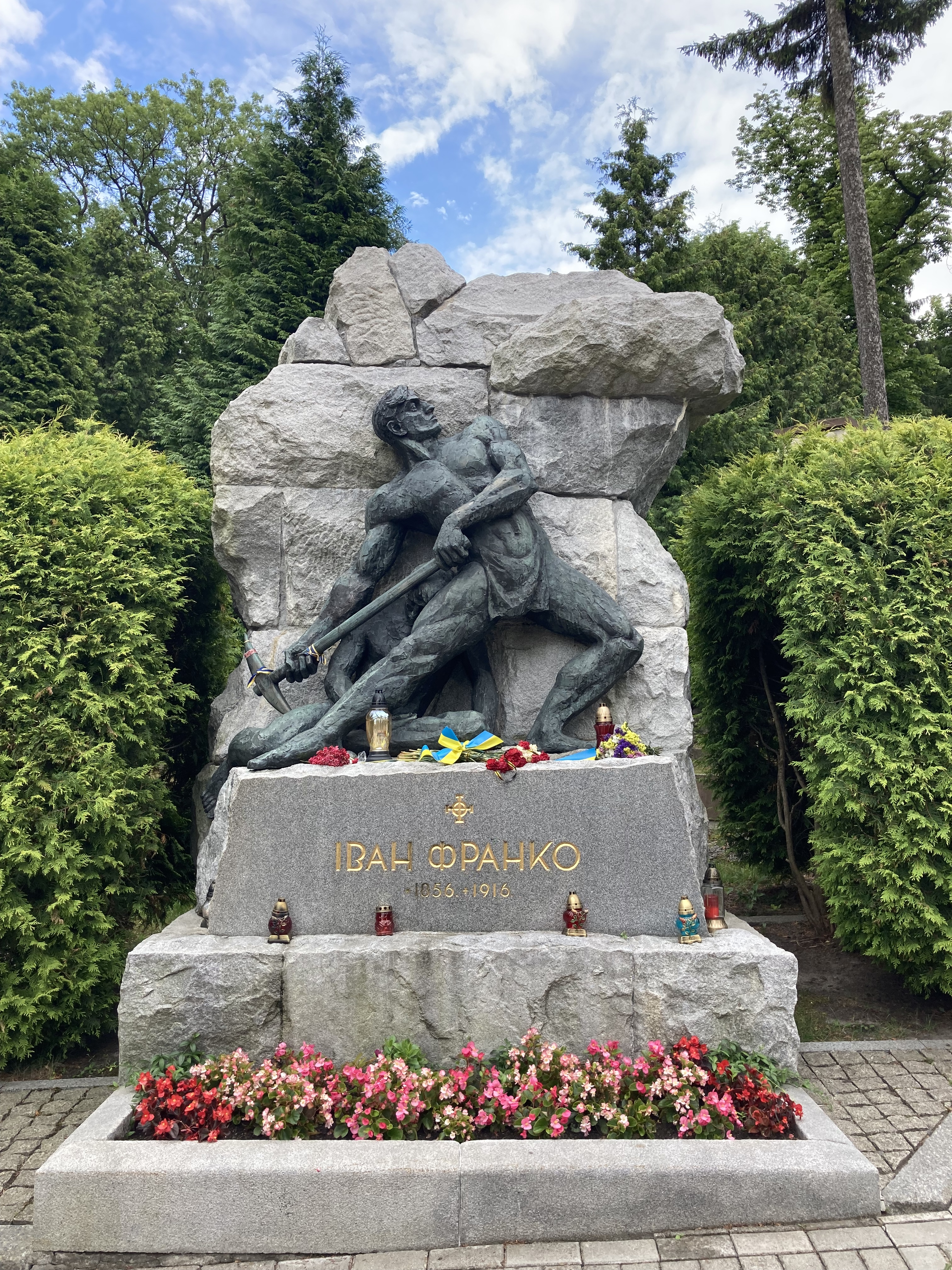
Grave of Ivan Franko in the Lychakiv Cemetery in Lviv, Ukraine depicting a stone breaker, in reference to his famous poem "Kameniari".

During the last eight years of his life Franko suffered from numerous sicknesses including migraines, tinnitus and polyarthritis, which were accompanied with fever, insomnia and hallucinations. After the start of the First World War, the author lost the care of his family, as his children Taras and Petro volunteered to the frontline, and his wife Olha was herself undergoing medical treatment in a psychiatric establishment. Starting from November 1915 Franko lived in a shelter organized for members of the Ukrainian Sich Riflemen. Suffering from new bouts of sickness, Ivan Franko died at the establishment at 4 pm on 28 May 1916.

On his deathbed Franko refused confession from Greek Catholic priests. As a result, the Church initially refused to bury the author, who was reputed to have been an atheist: permission for a public funeral was received only after the gravity of Franko's symptoms, from which he had suffered immediately before his death, and which could be attributed to mental illness, was proven to authorities. On 31 May numerous visitors came to the late author's residence in Lviv to pay him last respect, including his son Petro, composer Vasyl Barvinsky, who directed the solemn choir, and lawyer Kost Levytsky, who made the funeral speech. The funeral procession was accompanied by soldiers of the Legion of Ukrainian Sich Riflemen.

Due to wartime conditions, it was impossible to immediately allocate a burial plot, so Franko's body was initially interred in a vault rented from another family. Only five years after his death, on 28 May 1921, Ivan Franko's remains were reburied on the main alley of Lychakiv Cemetery in Lviv. In 1933 a monument depicting a stone-hewer, the main figure of one of Franko's famous poems, was opened at the site of his grave.

== Family ==
=== Wife ===
Olha Fedorivna Khoruzhynska (m. 1886-1941), a graduate of the Institute of Noble Dames in Kharkiv and later the two-year higher courses in Kyiv, she knew several languages and played piano, died in 1941

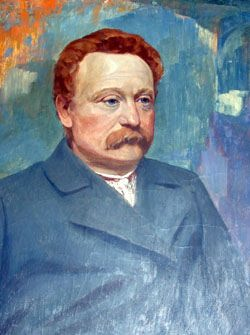
One of many portraits of Ivan Franko by Ukrainian impressionist artist Ivan Trush

=== Children ===
- Andriy Franko (1887 - 1913) - died at 27 from heart failure.
- Petro Franko (1890–1941), an engineer-chemist, a veteran of Ukrainian Sich Riflemen, founder of the Ukrainian Air Force, a Ukrainian politician, a people's deputy in the Verkhovna Rada
  - Petro Franko had two daughters who after marrying changed their names
- Taras Franko (1889 - 1971), a veteran of Ukrainian Sich Riflemen
  - Zenovia Franko (1925-1991), a Ukrainian philologist and an outstanding person of the Ukrainian nationalist movement in the times of the Soviet Union had two sons.
  - Daryna Franko (1926-2015).
  - Roland Franko (1931-2021), a Ukrainian politician, diplomat, and graduate of Kyiv Polytechnic Institute. By his efforts, in 1996, the United Kingdom freely transferred its Antarctic station Faraday to Ukraine, and it was later renamed the Vernadsky Research Base.
- Hanna Klyuchko (Franko) (1892 - 1988), a Ukrainian writer, publicist, memoirist

=== Children in law ===
- Olha Franko, wife of Petro (above)

According to Roland Franko, his grandfather was 1.74 metres (5.7 ft) tall, had red hair, always wore a mustache, and the Ukrainian embroidered shirt (vyshyvanka), even with a dress-coat.

Some of Franko's descendants emigrated to the US and Canada. His grand-nephew, Yuri Shymko, is a Canadian politician and human rights activist living in Toronto, who was elected to Canada's Parliament as well as the Ontario Legislature during the 1980s.

== Literary works ==
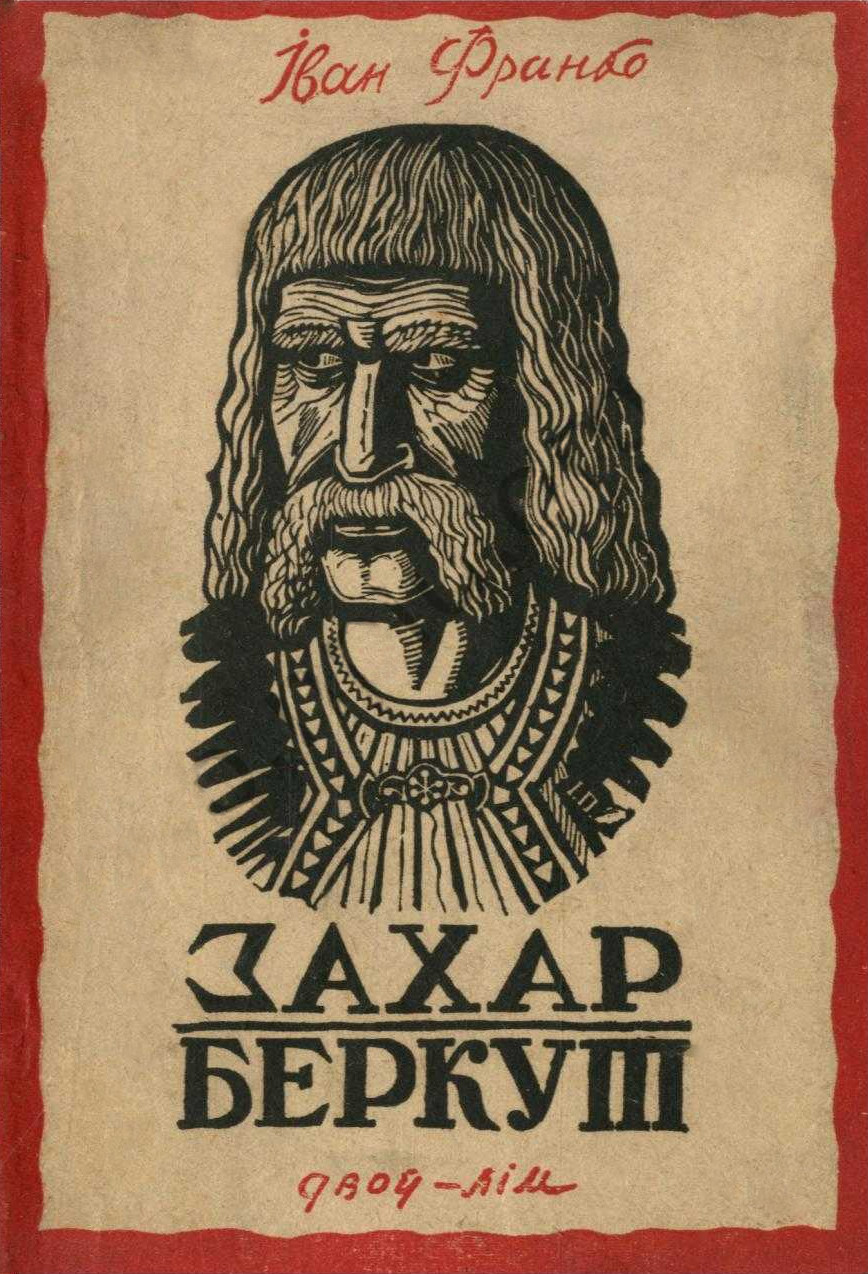
Cover of the 1932 edition of Franko's novella Zakhar Berkut

Lesyshyna Cheliad and Dva Pryiateli (Two Friends) were published in the literary almanac Dnistrianka in 1876. Later that year he wrote his first collection of poetry, Ballads and Tales. His first of the stories in the Boryslav series was published in 1877.

Franko depicted the harsh experience of Ukrainian workers and peasants in his novels Boryslav Laughs (1881–1882) and Boa Constrictor (1878). His works deal with Ukrainian nationalism and history (Zakhar Berkut, 1883), social issues (Basis of Society, 1895 and Withered Leaves, 1896), social and psychological problems (Crossed Paths, 1900), and philosophy (Semper Tiro, 1906).

He drew parallels between the Israelite search for a homeland and the Ukrainian desire for independence in In Death of Cain (1889) and Moses (1905). Stolen Happiness (1893) is considered as his best dramatic masterpiece. In total, Franko wrote more than 1,000 works.

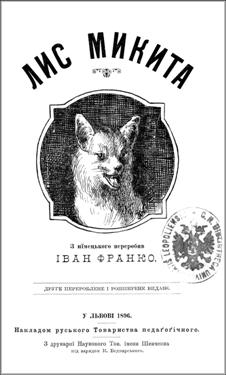
Franko's fairytale Lys Mykyta, later adopted as a cartoon series

He was widely promoted in Ukraine during the Soviet period, particularly for his poem Kameniari ("Stonebreakers" or "Stone-hewers") which contains revolutionary political ideas, hence earning him the name Kameniar ("Stone-hewer").

=== Works translated into English ===
English translations of Ivan Franko's works include:

- "What is Progress";
- "How a Ruthenian Busied Himself in the Other World", "How Yura Shykmanyuk Forded the Cheremosh", "A Thorn in His Foot" and "As in a Dream";
- "Mykytych's Oak Tree, The Gypsies", "It's His Own Fault" and "The Forest Nymph";
- "Hryts and the Young Lord", "The Cutthroats", "The Involuntary Hero" and "The Raging Tempest";
- "Unknown Waters" and "Lel and Polel";
- "Fateful Crossroads";
- "For the Home Hearth" and "Pillars of Society";
- "From the Notes of a Patient", "The High Life" and "The Postal Clerk";
- "Amidst the Just", "Fatherland", "The Jay's Wing" and "William Tell".
- Zakhar Berkut. (This translation was released in audiobook format on 5 July 2023)
- Boryslav in Flames, translated by Yuri Tkacz;
- Down and Out in Drohobych, translated by Yuri Tkacz.

An anthology containing short stories and novellas by Franko entitled Faces of Hardship was published in 2021.

== Philosophy and socio-political views ==
=== Philosophical views ===
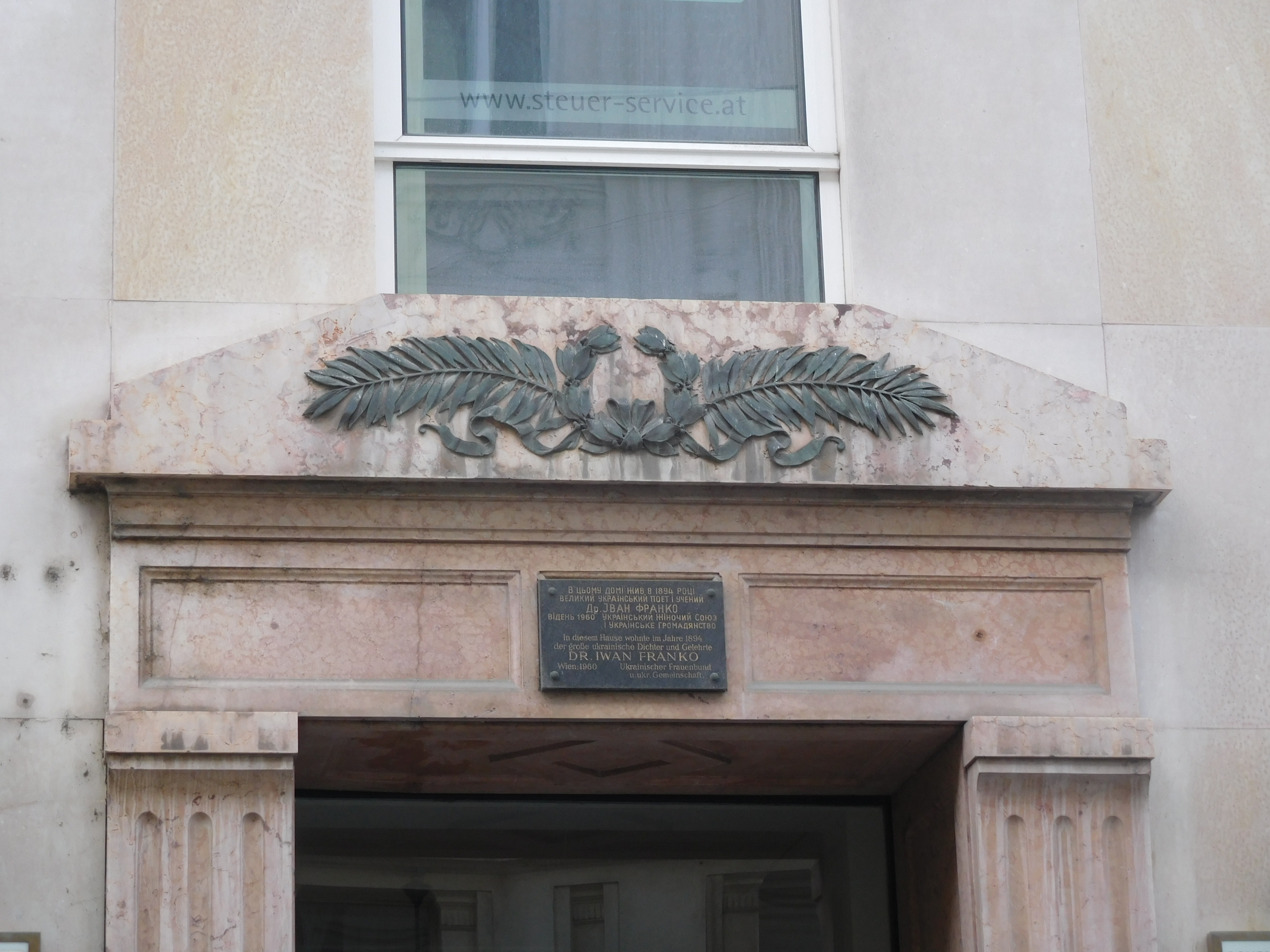
A memorial plaque to Ivan Franko on the house in which he resided during his stay in Vienna

Franko's early works were influenced by rationalist and positivist ideas, which he adopted from his mentor Drahomanov, and were characterised with realist aesthetics, apology of reason and promotion of art as a civic phenomenon that should be available to the masses. However, later in his career Franko's views became closer to the schools of Lebensphilosophie and "idealistic realism", based on the national romantic tradition and belief in creativity as purpose of the human spirit.

The central problem of Franko's literary work is the issue of the individual as opposed to the crowd. This contradiction is projected through the author's own experience as a member of the intelligentsia of a stateless folk, who must be ready to sacrifice his own life for the greater good of his community in order to turn it into an active and self-conscious national force. Franko's ideal is "full, unbound and unlimited [...] life and development of the nation". According to him, this ideal can be realized only by an integral personality, who devotes own feelings, thoughts and will to its achievement and believes in historical progress whose path lies in emancipation of the individual.

Franko was wary of excessive materialism and combined rationalism in faith and realism in art with romantic and idealistic beliefs expressed in his literary works. He dedicated an especially important role to the cultural development of Ukraine, the contemporary state of which he recognized as insufficient, and condemned Ukrainian Marxists for prioritizing global problems over the particular needs of the Ukrainian nation.

=== Views on the state and society ===
A number of Franko's publications were dedicated to the search for an optimal model of state organization. He opposed anarchist views on the state as the root of all evil and saw the majority of his contemporaries as too immoral and uneducated to be able to live in a society with no central authority. An important argument used by Franko to oppose anarchist federalism was the history of the Polish-Lithuanian Commonwealth, where unlimited freedom of local nobles resulted in total subjugation of the popular majority and decline of the state, leading to its eventual partition. At the same time, Franko also criticized the concept of proletarian dictatorship developed by social democrats. According to him, such a form of government would result in state capture by ruling circles and lead to cessation of any social progress. Franko saw an alternative to Marxism in left-libertarianism promoted by his contemporary Henry George. In his latter works he also criticized the federalist views of Drahomanov, which opposed the concept of national autonomy for Ukrainians and replaced it with self-government based on a territorial principle. According to Franko, not separate classes, but only nations, which he saw as the most stable form of human community, could act as subjects of history.

=== Franko and the Jews ===
Ivan Franko's literary heritage has produced varying interpretations of his views on society and politics. This ambiguity intensified after the disappearance of censorship with the fall of the Communist regime in Ukraine, which allowed the publication of the author's previously little-known texts. One of the most controversial topics in relations to the legacy of Franko's personality is his attitude to Jews: during the Soviet era some of his works, including the poem Moses, were banned from publication by the Ukrainian Soviet government due to their sympathetic depiction of the plight of the Jewish people, and his contribution to the improvement of Ukrainian-Jewish relations was also positively evaluated by authors from the Ukrainian diaspora; on the other hand, non-Ukrainian authors have in most cases presented Franko as an anti-semite, blaming him for the negative depiction of Jews in some of his works. On the centenary of Franko's birth American Jewish magazine Forverts accused him of presaging pogroms and compared the author to the haidamaks and other historical personalities known for their persecutions of Jews including Bohdan Khmelnytsky and Nikita Khrushchev. Some of Franko's texts have also been used to justify antisemitism by anti-semitic publications such as Krakivski Visti.

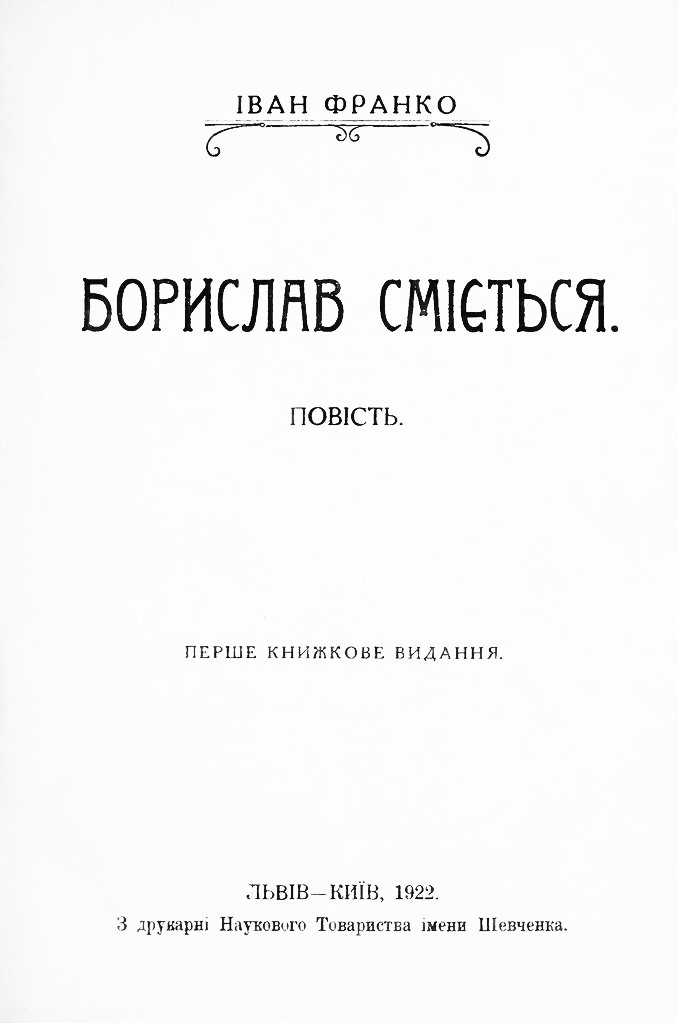
Front page of Franko's novella Boryslav Laughs, which produced accusations of anti-semitism against its author

Franko's own memoirs contain some mentions of his Jewish acquaintances starting from his childhood years. His mother had friendly relations with a local Jewish woman who was a tavern-keeper, and denied the truthfulness of the "blood fable" which was frequently employed against the Jews in Galicia. During his school studies Franko befriended a son of another Jewish tavern-keeper. In Drohobych he became friends with Isaac Tigerman, who was a relative of painter Maurycy Gottlieb. After Tigerman's death his father continued corresponding with Franko and even visited the Sich student society. Observations of the cultural differences between Jews and non-Jews aroused Franko's interest in cultures of the East and moved him to read the Old Testament, from which he made several translations into Ukrainian. As a Socialist activist Franko supported the right of the Jews for their own national branch in the Socialist movement. A number of Jews were also his colleagues in publishing activities. Franko also collected ethnographic material, including proverbs and sayings related to Jews, and his knowledge of Yiddish allowed him to get a better understanding of the life of poor Jewish workers in the area of Boryslav.

However, the majority of Ukrainian political movements in Galicia during Franko's time shared a negative attitude to Jews and considered them to be a threat to the Ukrainian people: Populists such as Stepan Kachala, as well as Russophiles headed by Ivan Naumovych and even Socialists like Mykhailo Pavlyk accused Jews of treachery and demoralization of Ruthenian-Ukrainian peasantry. Compared to them, Franko's promotion of solidarity with the Jews went contrary to the prevailing sentiments, as a result of which he was accused by some of his contemporaries of being a "Jewish hireling" and "half-Jew". During his stay in Vienna in 1893 Franko met with Zionist leader Theodor Herzl, and later wrote the foreword to the Lviv publication of his work Der Judenstaat. While Franko didn't fully agree with Herzl's idea of creating a Jewish state, considering it unrealistic, he recognized the need of solidarity between Jews to protect themselves from antisemitism. At the same time, Franko was highly critical of rich Jewish business owners, and depicted them as main antagonists of his novella Boryslav Laughs, dedicated to the workers' movement in Galicia. He also denied the truthfulness of the works of Nathan Hanover dedicated to the pogroms during the Khmelnytsky Uprising of 1648-1657, claiming that the depiction of those events by the author was exaggerated.

== Legacy ==
=== Commemoration in Ukraine ===
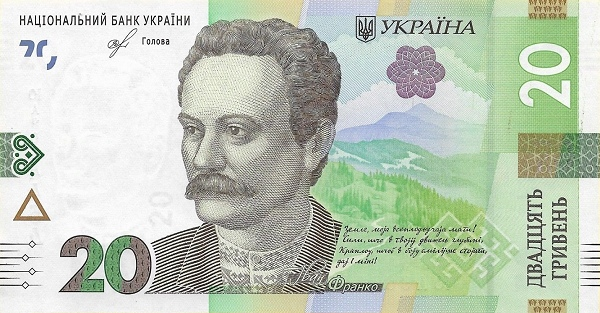
Ivan Franko portrait on obverse ₴20.00 bill circa 2018

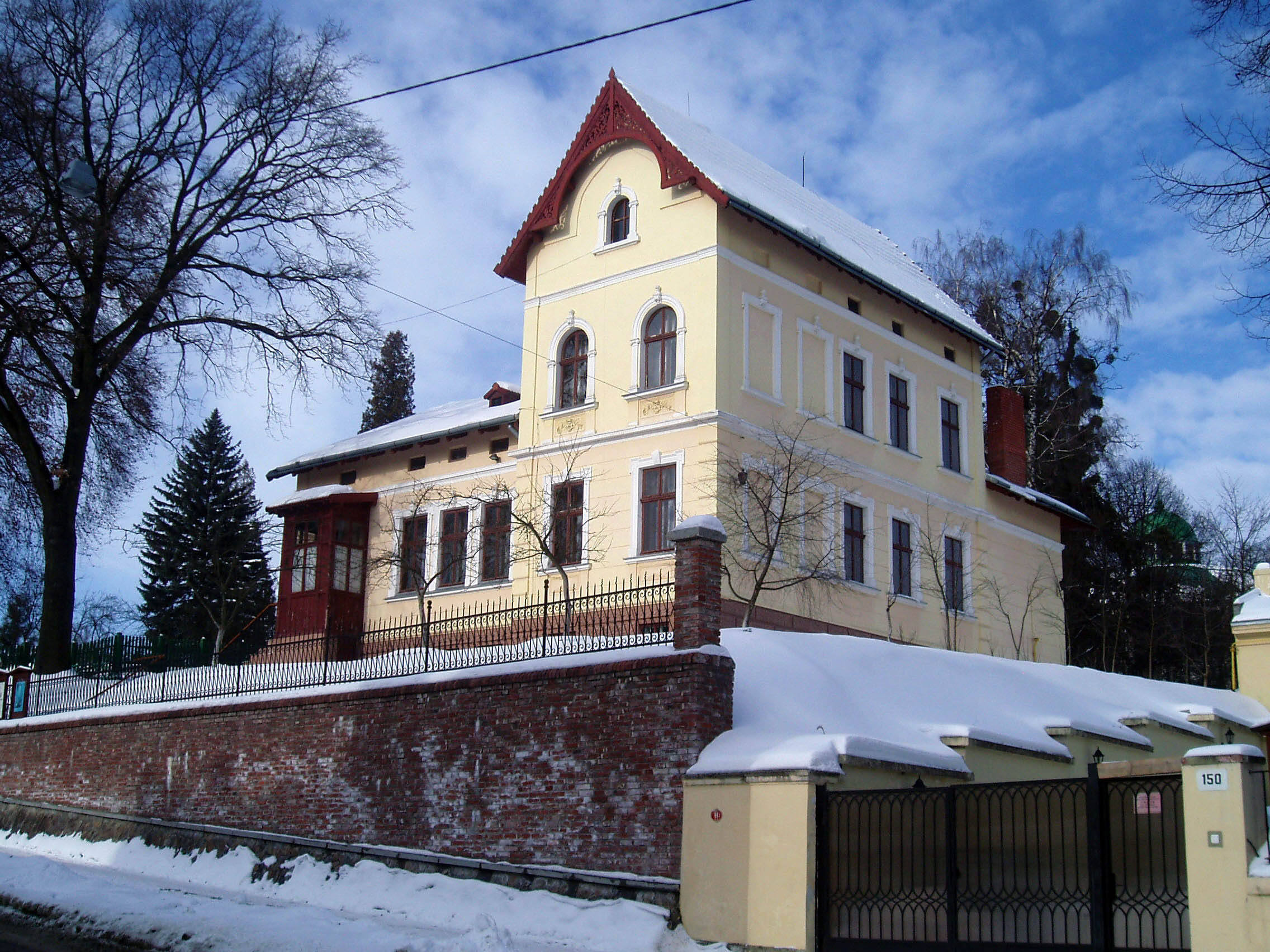
Ivan Franko memorial museum in his former villa in Lviv

In 1962 the city of Stanyslaviv in Western Ukraine (formerly Stanisławów, Poland) was renamed Ivano-Frankivsk in the poet's honor.

As of November 2018, in the Ukrainian-controlled part of Ukraine, there were 552 streets named after Ivan Franko, including one in the national capital Kyiv.

He is also associated with the name Kameniar after his famous poem, "Kameniari" ("The Stone-hewers"), especially during the time of the Soviet regime. Although he was a socialist, his political views mostly did not correspond to Soviet ideology. On 8 April 1978, the astronomer Nikolai Chernykh named an asteroid in honor of Franko by way of this name, 2428 Kamenyar.

=== Commemoration in the Ukrainian diaspora ===
Cyril Genik, the best man at Franko's wedding, emigrated to Canada. Genik was employed by the Canadian government as an immigration agent. With his cousin Ivan Bodrug, and Bodrug's friend Ivan Negrich, the three were known as the Березівська Трійця (the Bereziv Triumvirate) in Winnipeg. Imbued by Franko's nationalism and liberalism, Genik and his Triumvirate had no compunction about bringing Bishop Seraphim to Winnipeg in 1903, a Russian monk, consecrated a bishop on Mount Athos, to free the Ukrainians of all the religious and political groups in Canada who were wrangling to assimilate them. Within two years, Seraphim built the notorious Tin Can Cathedral in Winnipeg's North-End, which claimed nearly 60,000 adherents. Today, a bust of Ivan Franko stands in the courtyard of the Ivan Franko Manor on McGregor St. in Winnipeg.

Boundless Plain
Franko wrote the lyrics for this song composed by Mykola Lysenko in 1898 and performed in 2014, duration is 0:59

Princely Moon
Franko wrote the lyrics for this song composed by Mykola Lysenko, and performed in 2010, duration is 2:13

=== In other countries ===
On the Centennial of Franko's PhD defence in 1993, the then Austrian vice chancellor Erhard Busek had a commemorative bust installed in the university building on Ringstrasse, opposite Übungsraum 1 and 2 at the Department of Germanistik. In 2013, an additional plaque was added, after an academic symposium had clarified Franko's relationship to Judaism, mentioned anti-Semitic stereotypes in Franko's work as well as close Jewish friends.

=== Cultural legacy ===
Ukrainian composer Yudif Grigorevna Rozhavskaya (1923-1982) used Franko’s text for her songs.

In 2001 one of Franko's iconic poems, Moses, was adopted as an opera by Ukrainian composer Myroslav Skoryk.

In 2019 a Ukrainian-American historical action film The Rising Hawk with budget $5 million was released. It is based on the historical fiction book Zakhar Berkut by Ivan Franko.

== See also ==
- Ivan Franko Museum
- Ivan Franko International Prize
- Omelian Hlibovytskyi
- Ivan Kuziv
- Ostap Nyzhankivsky
- Ivan Popel
- Oleksa Volianskyi
- List of Ukrainian-language poets
- List of Ukrainian-language writers
- List of Ukrainian literature translated into English

== Bibliography ==
- Hrytsak, Jaroslav (2018). Ivan Franko and His Community. Translated by Olynyk, Marta. Academic Studies Press. ISBN 978-1-61811-968-1.
