= Halyna Ivashkiv =

Ukrainian art historian (born 1962)

- Галина Михайлівна Івашків
- Born: 5 March 1962 (age 64); Tseperiv, now Lviv Oblast, Ukraine
- Education: University of Lviv
- Occupation: Art historian

Halyna Ivashkiv (Ukrainian: Галина Михайлівна Івашків; born 5 March 1962) is a Ukrainian art historian. Wife of Vasyl Ivashkiv. Doctor of Arts (2022). Full member of the Shevchenko Scientific Society (2025).

== Biography ==
Halyna Ivashkiv was born on 5 March 1962, in Tseperiv, now part of Novyi Yarychiv settlement hromada, Lviv Raion, Lviv Oblast, Ukraine.

In 1986, she graduated from the History Department of the University of Lviv. From 1982 to 1987, she worked as a tour guide and research assistant at the Ternopil Oblast Museum, and from 1987 to 1992, she was a tour guide and senior research assistant at the State Museum of Ukrainian Fine Arts in Kyiv. In 1992, she began working as a junior research assistant at the Museum of Ethnography and Crafts of the Institute of Ethnology of the National Academy of Sciences of Ukraine in Lviv, where she worked as a research assistant from 2005 to 2008 and as a senior research assistant from 2008 to 2022. From 2022, she has been a leading research associate in the Institute's Department of Folk Art and the leading curator of the Museum's Folk Ceramics collection. She is a member of the Academic Council of the Institute of Ethnology of the National Academy of Sciences of Ukraine.

She is the author of over 140 scientific publications.

In the field of scientific interests, research into current issues in Ukrainian decorative and applied arts, primarily the work of individual masters, the decoration of Ukrainian folk ceramics, the artistic features of figurative and ritual ceramics, Ukrainian pysanka, etc.

== Selected works ==
=== Monographs ===
- Dekor ukrayinskoi narodnoi keramiky ХVІ — pershoi polovyny ХХ stolit (Lviv, 2007).

=== Scientific and artistic publications ===
- Vasyl Shostopalets i keramika Sokalia (Lviv, 2007);
- Zbirka keramiky Petra Linynskoho (Lviv, 2010);
- Maliovana keramika Kosova ta Pistynia ХІХ — pochatku ХХ stolit (author of the introductory article, co-editor; Lviv, 2012);
- Maliovani mysky Podillia (co-author of the introductory article, co-editor, co-author; Lviv, 2018).

== Awards ==
- Mayor of Lviv Prize (2011)
- Sviatoslav Hordynskyi Award (2011)
- F. I. Shmit National Academy of Sciences of Ukraine Award (2013)
- Stefan Taranushenko Prize from the National Union of Folk Artists of Ukraine (2018)

== Bibliography ==
- Онищенко В. Дослідницькі набутки Галини Івашків // Образотворче мистецтво. — 2009. — № 3.
- Селівачов М. Зразково ретельне дослідження // Мистецтвознавчий автограф. — 2009–2010. — № 4–5. — С. 313–316.
- Онищенко В. Петро Лінинський: історія кахлі Галичини. Образотворче мистецтво. — 2012. — № 1/2. — С. 124.
- Станкевич М. [Рецензія на вид.: Мальована кераміка Косова та Пістиня ХІХ – початку ХХ століть. Альбом / автор вст. статті Г. Івашків, упорядники — Г. Івашків, Т. Лозинський. Львів: Інститут колекціонерства українських мистецьких пам’яток при НТШ, 2012. 408 с., 785 іл.]. Мистецтвознавство ’12. Львів: СКІМ, ІН НАНУ, 2012. С. 304–305].
- Мотиль Р. Дивосвіт Поділля // Народознавчі зошити. — 2020. — № 1. — С. 245–246.
