= Oleh Osukhovskyi =

Ukrainian politician

- Олег Осуховський
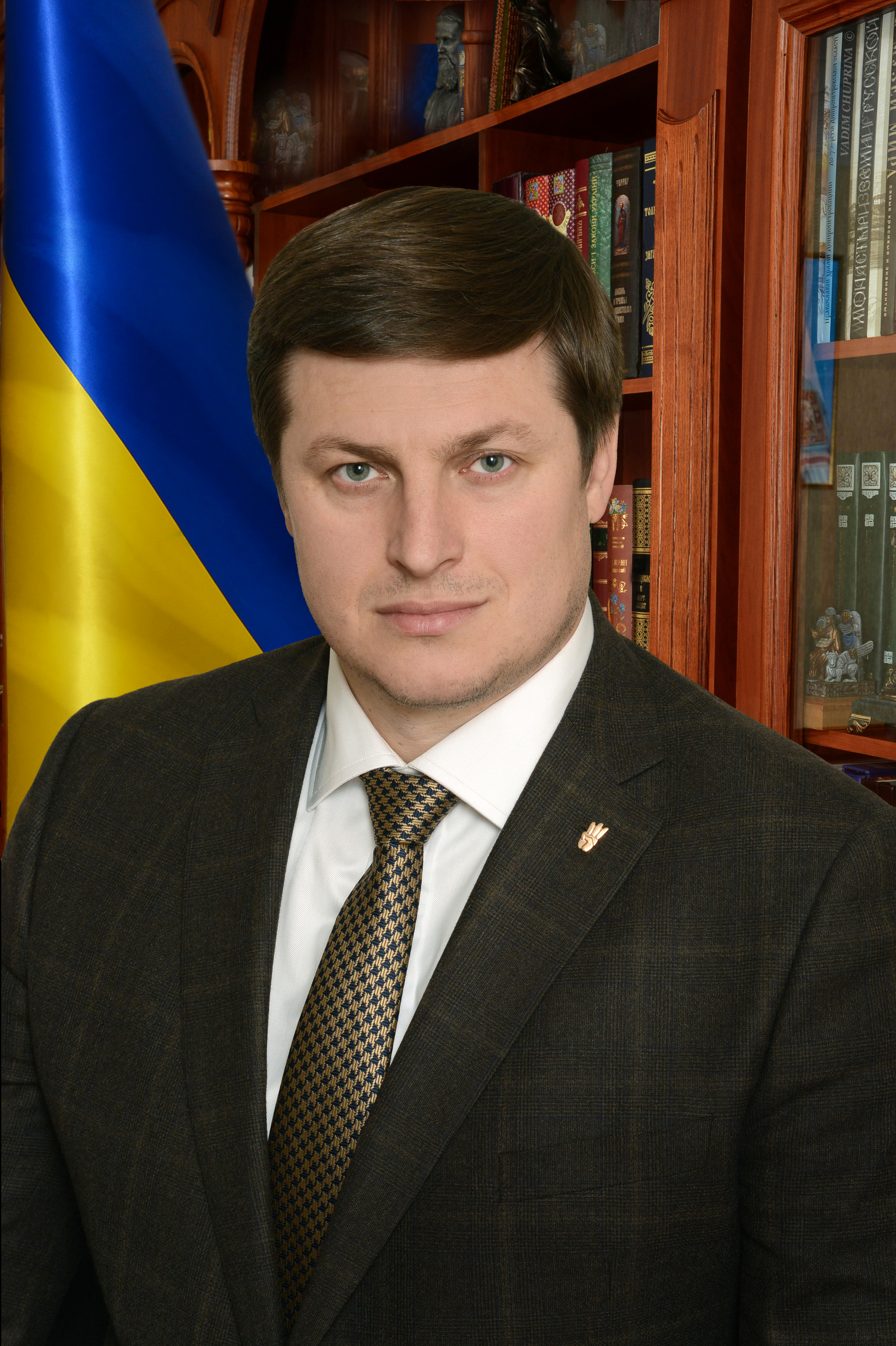

People's Deputy of Ukraine
- In office 12 December 2012 – 29 August 2019
- Preceded by: Constituency re-established
- Succeeded by: Oleksandr Kovalchuk
- Constituency: Rivne Oblast, No. 152

Personal details
- Born: 18 June 1978 (age 48) Velykosilky, Ukrainian SSR, Soviet Union (now Ukraine)
- Party: Svoboda
- Education: Lviv University

Oleh Ivanovych Osukhovskyi (Ukrainian: Олег Іванович Осуховський; born 18 June 1978) is a Ukrainian politician and former professional footballer who served as a People's Deputy of Ukraine from Ukraine's 152nd electoral district, located in Rivne Oblast, from 2012 to 2019. Prior to his election he was a member of the Rivne Oblast Council.

== Early life and career ==
Oleh Ivanovych Osukhovskyi was born 18 June 1978 in the village of Velykosilky, in Ukraine's western Lviv Oblast. He graduated from secondary school in 1995 and from the economic faculty of Lviv University in 2007, specialising in finance and credit. He was head From 2000 to 2002 he played for Gazovik-Skala, a professional football club based in Stryi. He also played minifootball in England from 2004 to 2005 for Kentish Town F.C. and Barnet F.C..

From 2007 to 2008 Osukhovskyi was director of transportation and marketing for Mercury LTD, a Stryi-based company. He has been a chairman of All-Ukrainian Lustration, a non-governmental organisation, since 2008, chairman of non-governmental organisation Ukrainian Community of Kyiv since 2009 and president of minifootball club Kardinal-Rivne since 2010. He was also chair of a group monitoring the State Committee of Entrepreneurs of Ukraine.

== Political career ==
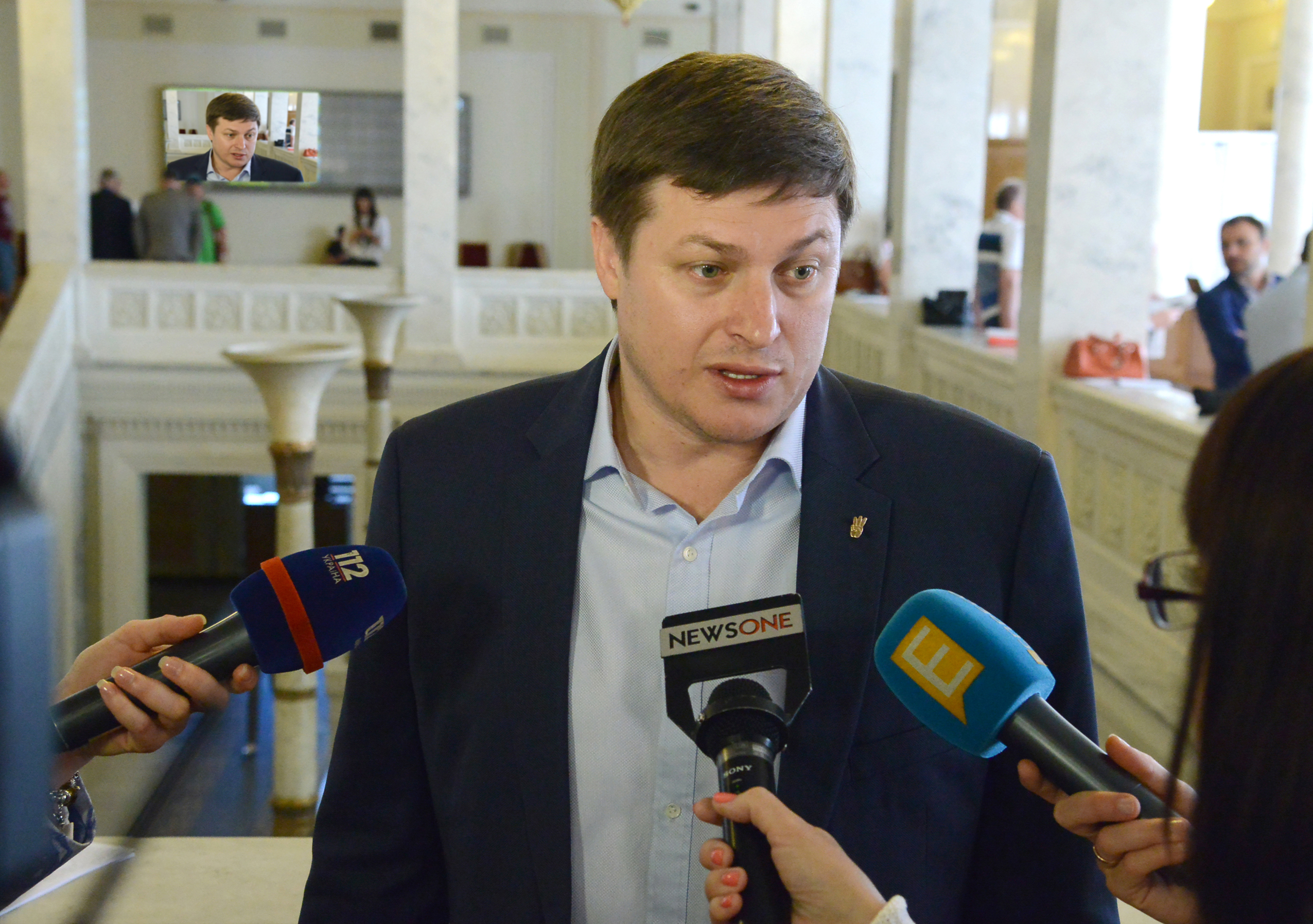
Osukhovskyi in 2016

Osukhovskyi joined the Social-National Party of Ukraine in 1998. Following Oleh Tiahnybok's election as People's Deputy of Ukraine in the 1998 Ukrainian parliamentary election Osukhovskyi worked as an intern for him. He also served on the Kamianka-Buzka Raion Council from 2006 to 2010, and was a deputy of the Rivne Oblast Council from 2010 to 2012. He was elected chairman of the Rivne Oblast division of Svoboda twice, once in 2010 and once in 2015.

Osukhovskyi first ran in the 2007 Ukrainian parliamentary election on the proportional list of the Svoboda party. He ran again in the 2012 Ukrainian parliamentary election, this time for Ukraine's 152nd electoral district in Rivne Oblast. With 12 competitors, he was successfully elected with 39.75% of the vote.

=== People's Deputy of Ukraine ===
Within the 7th Ukrainian Verkhovna Rada (parliament), Osukhovskyi was head of the Subcommittee on International Cooperation in Fighting Organised Crime and Terrorism and Fighting Money Laundering, part of the Verkhovna Rada Organised Crime and Corruption Committee. He was re-elected in the 2014 Ukrainian parliamentary election with a plurality of the vote, winning 24.51% against 16 other candidates. Following the election he was a member of the Verkhovna Rada Committee on Preventing and Fighting Corruption.

Osukhovskyi ran in the 152nd electoral district during the 2019 Ukrainian parliamentary election. This time, he placed second to Oleksandr Kovalchuk from the Servant of the People party, winning 13.93% of the vote compared to Kovalchuk's 31.16%.

Osukhovskyi was Svoboda's candidate for mayor of Rivne in the 2020 Ukrainian local elections, but he was not successfully elected.
