= Novyi Yarychiv =

Rural locality in Lviv Oblast, Ukraine

Novyi Yarychiv Новий Яричів
- Rural settlement
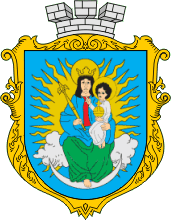
- Flag Coat of arms

- Location in Lviv Oblast Location in Ukraine
- Coordinates: 49°54′10″N 24°18′20″E
- Country: Ukraine
- Oblast: Lviv Oblast
- Raion: Lviv Raion
- Hromada: Novyi Yarychiv settlement hromada

Population (2022)
  - Total: 2,955
- Time zone: UTC+2 (EET)
  - Summer (DST): UTC+3 (EEST)

Novyi Yarychiv (Ukrainian: Новий Яричів) is a rural settlement in Lviv Raion of Lviv Oblast in Ukraine. It is located approximately 10 kilometres (6.2 mi) from the center of the city of Lviv. It hosts the administration of Novyi Yarychiv settlement hromada, one of the hromadas of Ukraine. Population: 2,955 (2022 estimate).

== History ==
Until 18 July 2020, Novyi Yarychiv belonged to Kamianka-Buzka Raion. The raion was abolished in July 2020 as part of the administrative reform of Ukraine, which reduced the number of raions of Lviv Oblast to seven. The area of Kamianka-Buzka Raion was split between Chervonohrad and Lviv Raions, with Novyi Yarychiv being transferred to Lviv Raion.

Until 26 January 2024, Novyi Yarychiv was designated urban-type settlement. On this day, a new law entered into force which abolished this status, and Novyi Yarychiv became a rural settlement.

== Economy ==
=== Transportation ===
The closest railway station is located in Zapytiv, 2 kilometres (1.2 mi) west of Novyi Yarychiv. It is on the railway which connects Lviv with Kovel via Chervonohrad and Volodymyr and with Lutsk.

The settlement is on Highway M06 connecting Lviv and Kyiv.

== Notable people ==
- Shalom Rozenfeld (1800–1851), rabbi
