= Oleksii Hunovskyi =

Ukrainian Greek Catholic priest, composer, public figure

- Олексій Гуньовський
- Born: 1882; Didyliv, Lviv Oblast, Austria-Hungary
- Died: May 1961 (aged 78–79); Borshchiv, Ternopil Oblast
- Education: Lviv Theological Seminarie, Przemyśl Theological Seminarie

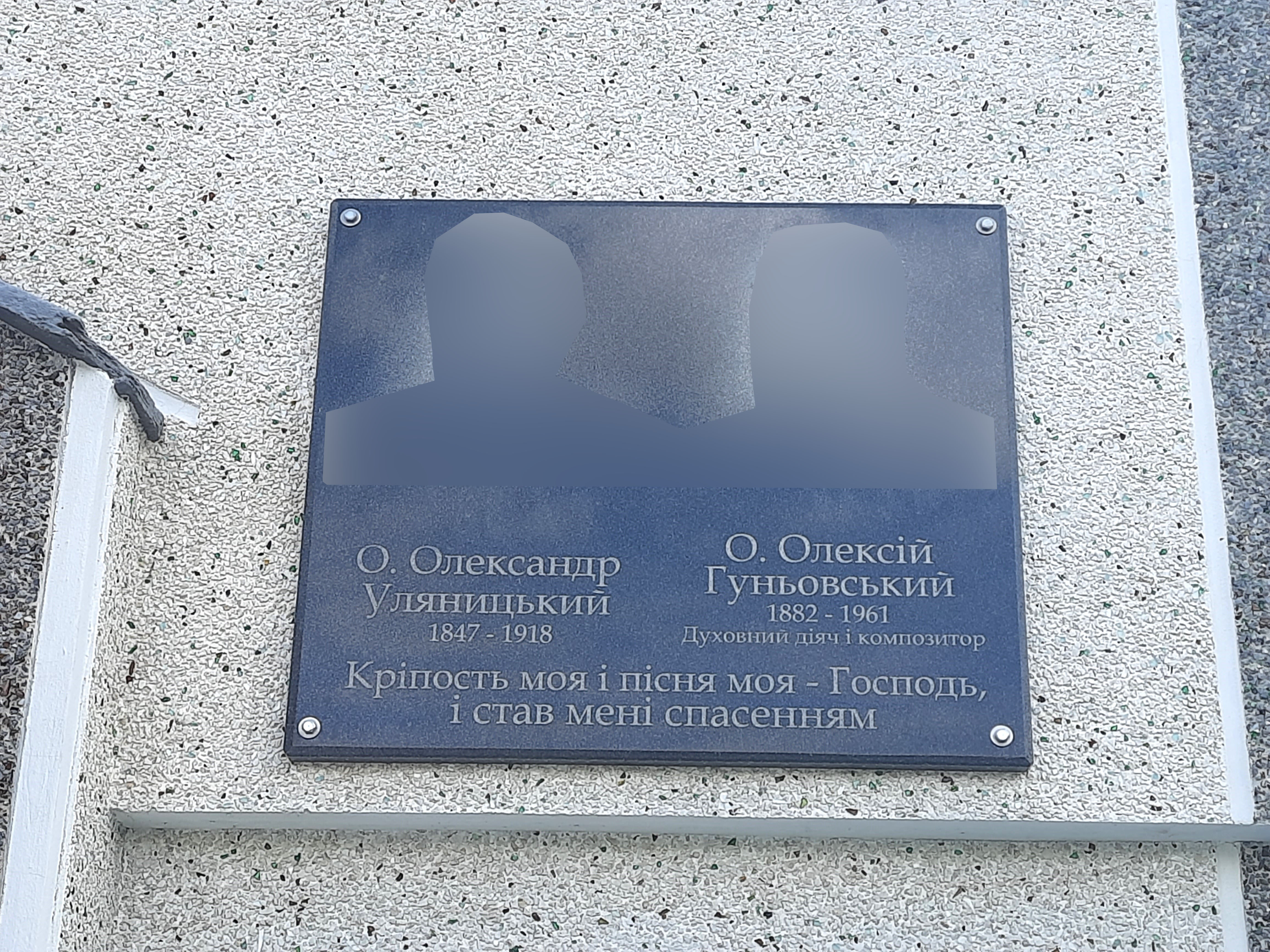
Memorial plaque to priests Oleksandr Ulianytskyi and Oleksii Hunovskyi on the facade of Saint Michael Church in Lanivtsi, where they served as parish priests.

Oleksii Danylovych Hunovskyi (Ukrainian: Олексіій Данилович Гуньовський; 1882, Didyliv, Lviv Oblast, Austria-Hungary – May 1961, Borshchiv, Ternopil Oblast) was a Ukrainian Greek Catholic priest, composer, public figure, educator, and political prisoner. Head of the Chortkiv District National Council of the ZUNR.

== Biography ==
Oleksii Hunovskyi was born in 1882 in Didyliv, now the Novyi Yarychiv Hromada of the Lviv Raion of the Lviv Oblast of Ukraine.

Huniovskyi graduated from the Lviv and Przemyśl Theological Seminaries.

On 2 September 1906, he was ordained a priest by Bishop Hryhoriy Khomyshyn. He served as the fourth (1906–1909), third (1909–1910) cathedral staff member and catechist at the separate school on Knihynyn-Hirka in Stanyslaviv (now Ivano-Frankivsk), and from 1911 in Chortkiv, where he was a staff member of the Church of the Dormition and a catechist at the teacher's seminary and a private gymnasium.

During the period of the ZUNR, he headed the Chortkiv District National Council.

In 1920, he was appointed as a superior in the village of Ozeriany of the Skala Deanery. From 1921 he was at the parish in the village of Lanivtsi, where he founded a cooperative, a drama club, and the mixed choir "Prosvita".

On 24 November 1924, he was granted the right to wear a pelerine, named the mayor of Skalskyi and made a school commissioner.

After the beginning of the oppression of the Greek Catholic Church, he held services in Ivano-Frankivsk Oblast underground. In 1947, he was arrested by the Borshchiv District Department of the Ministry of Internal Affairs (Article 54-10 of the Criminal Code of the Ukrainian SSR). According to the decision of the Ombudsman's Office of the USSR Ministry of State Security, he was exiled to Siberia. He was released in 1956 and returned to western Ukraine. Later he lived in Borshchiv.

He wrote spiritual songs and carols and was acquainted with the Ukrainian writer Bohdan Lepkyi. He played the zither well, for which he wrote down notes.

Hunovskyi died in May 1961 in Borshchiv, Ternopil Oblast. He was buried with his wife in the village of Lanivtsi near Borshchiv (according to other sources – in Borshchiv).

== Family ==
In 1906, he married Olena Radzykevych, the daughter of Oleksandr Radzykevych. Together they raised seven children: Nadiia, Bohdan, Mariia, Dariia, Sofia, Volodymyr-Rostyslav, and Hanna (wife of at. Antonii Kaznovskyi's son Stepan).

== Honoring the memory ==
A plaque in honor of at. Oleksandr Ulianytskyi and at. Oleksii Hunovskyi was installed on the facade of the Greek Catholic Church of Saint Michael church in Lanivtsi.
