= Petro Bakovych =

- Born: August 7, 1893; Didyliv, now Kamianka-Buzka Raion, Lviv region, Ukraine
- Died: June 16, 1978 (aged 84); New York, USA

Petro Bakovych (Ukrainian: Петро Бакович, August 7, 1893, Didyliv, now Kamianka-Buzka Raion, Lviv region, Ukraine – June 16, 1978, New York, USA) was Captain of the Army of the Ukrainian People's Republic and the Ukrainian Galician Army, and regional commander of the Ukrainian Military Organization.

== Biography ==
He was born on August 7, 1893, in Galicia, in the village of Didyliv, Kamianka-Strumyliv County (Kingdom of Galicia and Lodomeria, Austro-Hungarian Empire, Kamianka-Buzka Raion, Lviv region, Ukraine).

In 1913 he graduated from the Academic Gymnasium in Lviv. During the First World War he served in the 30th Infantry Regiment of the Regional Defense of the Austro-Hungarian Army. He served in the Ukrainian Galician Army, commander of the regiment of the 3rd Berzezany Brigade. Later, the commander of the 1st Rifle Brigade of Sirka of the 5th Kherson Rifle Division of the UPR Army.

From 1921 he was a member of the UVO, a combat officer of the Initial Team of the organization during 1921–1922. In 1923 he held the position of regional commander of the UVO.

In 1922 he was hired by the Lviv branch of the M. Shashkevych Prosvita Society. At that time the secretary of the branch was Yevhen Konovalets. He is an active member of the Ukrainian Cooperative, a long-time inspector of the Audit Union of Ukrainian Cooperatives in Lviv and a member of many societies.

After World War II he emigrated to the United States. He died on June 16, 1978, in New York City and is buried in a Ukrainian cemetery in South Bound Brook, New Jersey.
