= Tseperiv, Lviv Oblast =

Rural locality in Lviv Oblast, Ukraine

Tseperiv Цеперів
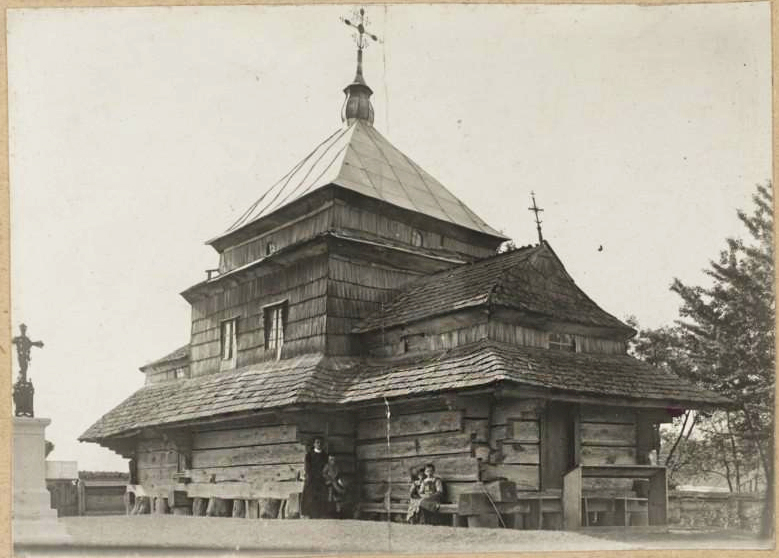
- The old church in Tseperiv. Built in 1749, dismantled in 1938.

- Location in Lviv Oblast Tseperiv (Ukraine)
- Coordinates: 49°56′0″N 24°18′19″E
- Country: Ukraine
- Oblast: Lviv Oblast
- Raion: Lviv Raion
- Hromada: Novyi Yarychiv settlement hromada
- Time zone: UTC+2 (EET)
  - Summer (DST): UTC+3 (EEST)
- Postal code: 80465

Tseperiv (Ukrainian: Цеперів) is a village in the Novyi Yarychiv settlement hromada of the Lviv Raion of Lviv Oblast in Ukraine.

== History ==
Village was first mentioned in 1581, although some sources indicate the existence of the village as early as 1444 and village metrics from 1405.

In the second half of the 17th century, the village, along with the surrounding territories, was owned by the Polish noblewoman Katarzyna Sobieska, sister of King John III Sobieski.

On 19 July 2020, as a result of the administrative-territorial reform and liquidation of the Kamianka-Buzka Raion, the village became part of the Lviv Raion.

== Religion ==
- Church of the Resurrection (1938, architect Yevhen Nahirnyi)

== Notable residents ==
- Halyna Ivashkiv (born 1955), Ukrainian art historian

== Bibliography ==
- "Ceperów". Geographical Dictionary of the Kingdom of Poland (in Polish). 1. Warszawa: Kasa im. Józefa Mianowskiego. 1880. p. 533.
- "Ceperów". Geographical Dictionary of the Kingdom of Poland (in Polish). p. 294.
