= Velykosilky =

Rural locality in Lviv Oblast, Ukraine

Velykosilky Великосілки
- Location in Lviv Oblast Velykosilky (Ukraine)
- Coordinates: 49°59′41″N 24°25′28″E
- Country: Ukraine
- Oblast: Lviv Oblast
- Raion: Lviv Raion
- Hromada: Novyi Yarychiv settlement hromada
- Time zone: UTC+2 (EET)
  - Summer (DST): UTC+3 (EEST)
- Postal code: 80453

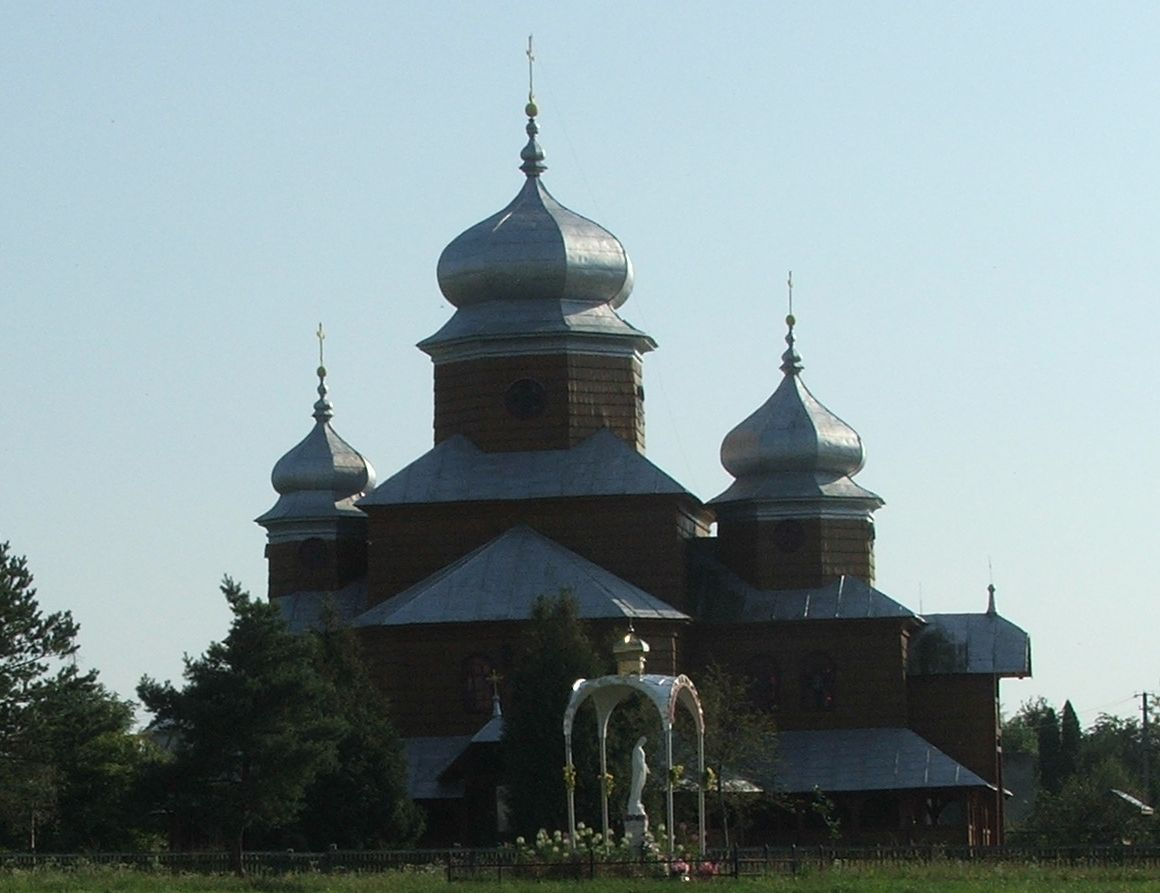

Velykosilky (Ukrainian: Великосілки, Polish: Wełykosiłky) is a village in the Novyi Yarychiv settlement hromada of the Lviv Raion of Lviv Oblast in Ukraine.

== History ==
The village of Velykosilky, formerly known as Zhelekhiv Velykyi (Polish: Żelechów Wielki), was first mentioned on 15 October (23 July, new style) 1393, when Polish King Władysław II Jagiełło granted the right to own the village of Zhelekhiv with the neighboring monastery to Mykhailo of Sułkowice.

On 19 July 2020, as a result of the administrative-territorial reform and liquidation of the Kamianka-Buzka Raion, the village became part of the Lviv Raion.

== Religion ==
- Saint Paraskeva church (1892, wooden)
- Church of the Visitation of Elizabeth by the Blessed Virgin Mary (1781)

== Notable residents ==
- Myroslav Vantukh (born 1939), Ukrainian choreographer, general director and artistic director of the P. Virsky Ukrainian National Folk Dance Ensemble, Hero of Ukraine
- Teodozii Voznyi (1928–1992), Ukrainian linguist, Doctor of Philology, Professor
- Jan Hrynkowski (1891–1971), Polish painter, graphic artist, stage designer
- Zinoviy Demtsiukh (1943-2026), Ukrainian conductor, teacher, associate professor at the Ivan Franko National University of Lviv, Honored Worker of Culture of Ukraine
- Yevhen Kurtiak (1936–1996), Ukrainian writer, journalist
- Fylymon Kurchaba (1911–1995), Ukrainian Greek Catholic hierarch
- Oleh Osukhovskyi (born 1978), Ukrainian public and political figure and statesman. Member of Parliament of Ukraine of the VII and VIII convocations

== Bibliography ==
- "Żelechów 2.) Ż. Wielki". Geographical Dictionary of the Kingdom of Poland (in Polish). 14. Warszawa: Kasa im. Józefa Mianowskiego. 1895. p. 766.
