= Yaroslav Rushchyshyn =

Ukrainian businessman and politician (1967–2025)

- Ярослав Рущишин
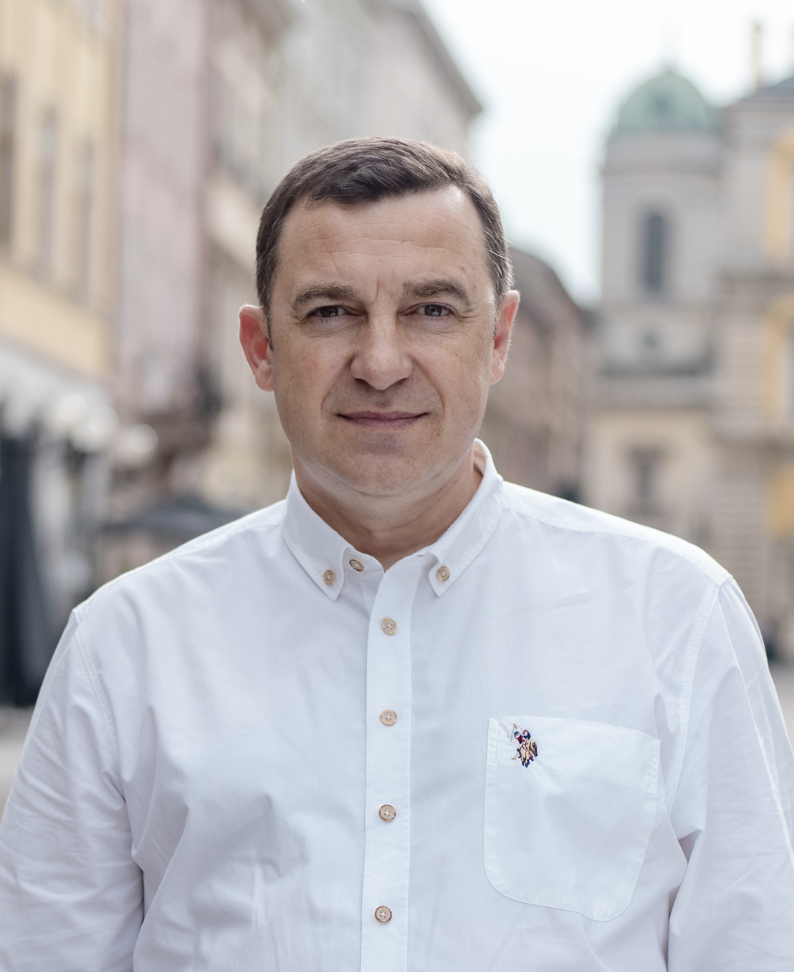
- Rushchyshyn in 2020

People's Deputy of Ukraine
- In office 29 August 2019 – 24 July 2025
- Preceded by: Oksana Yurynets
- Constituency: Lviv Oblast, No. 117

Personal details
- Born: 29 October 1967 Lviv, Ukrainian SSR, USSR (now Ukraine)
- Died: 24 July 2025 (aged 57) Ivano-Frankivsk Oblast, Ukraine
- Party: Holos
- Other political affiliations: Independent
- Education: Lviv University of Trade and Economics; National University of Kyiv-Mohyla Academy; Taras Shevchenko National University of Kyiv; Ukrainian Catholic University

Yaroslav Ivanovych Rushchyshyn (Ukrainian: Ярослав Іванович Рущишин; 29 October 1967 – 24 July 2025) was a Ukrainian businessman and politician who at the time of his death had been serving as a People's Deputy of Ukraine from Ukraine's 117th electoral district since 29 August 2019. Earlier, he had been an active contributor to the local culture of the city of Lviv, and one of the student organisers of the 1990 Revolution on Granite.

== Early life and career ==
Yaroslav Ivanovych Rushchyshyn was born on 29 October 1967 in the city of Lviv, then in the Ukrainian Soviet Socialist Republic within the Soviet Union. He graduated from the Lviv University of Trade and Economics with a major in accounting, from the National University of Kyiv-Mohyla Academy with an MBA, and from Taras Shevchenko National University of Kyiv with a degree in law. He additionally completed two certificate programmes in philosophy at the Ukrainian Catholic University. In addition to his native Ukrainian, he was fluent in English, Polish, and French, and was learning German.

Rushchyshyn was a member of the Lvivshchyna Student Brotherhood from the organisation's founding, and was one of the Brotherhood's leading members during the 1990 Revolution on Granite. Rushchyshyn helped to organise protests by students at the Lviv University of Trade and Economics on 2 October 1990, as well as a student hunger strike, thus beginning the Revolution on Granite.

== Cultural and business activities ==
Prior to and following the Revolution on Granite, Rushchyshyn began undertaking activities to benefit Ukraine's culture, including helping to organise the Vyvykh festivals in 1990 and 1992. Rushchyshyn, as well as fellow student leader Markian Ivashchyshyn worked as a producer for Ukrainian musicians throughout the 1990s, including Dead Rooster, Ruslana, and Okean Elzy. In 1993, together with several other fellow students and local artists, Rushchyshyn helped found the Dzyga Art Center.

Rushchyshyn was also active in the Ukrainian Greek Catholic Church, helping to reorganise Ukrainian Youth for Christ following Ukraine's independence. He was declared an honorary senator at the Ukrainian Catholic University.

Rushchyshyn compared his ideal vision for Lviv to the British cities of Oxford and Cambridge, and called for greater investment into local education and culture. He was owner of Trottola JSC, a network of sewing factories based in Western Ukraine. Along with other entrepreneurs, he protested against the tax authorities in Lviv Oblast, eventually becoming one of the members of the Council of Entrepreneurs in Lviv Oblast.

=== Lvivska Hazeta ===
In 2003, along with Ivashchyshyn, Rushchyshyn became owner of Lviv-based internet news portal Lvivska Hazeta. The portal received attention for articles criticising the tax administration headed by Serhiy Medvedchuk (brother of Viktor Medvedchuk). In response, the tax administration accused Ivashchyshyn and Rushchyshyn of money laundering, claiming that Trottola JSC had not been announced as a sponsor of the "Listen to Ukrainian!" festival, a get out the vote measure in the 2002 Ukrainian parliamentary election. The attempt was further alleged by Ukrainian newspaper Dzerkalo Tyzhnia as part of an effort by the Ukrainian government to crush resistance from veterans of the Revolution on Granite, particularly Ivashchyshyn, who had been a leader of anti-government protests such as Ukraine without Kuchma. However, the attempt to charge the two with a crime was ultimately unsuccessful; Ivashchyshyn and Rushchyshyn were found to be innocent.

== Political career ==
Rushchyshyn was floated as a potential candidate by influential newspaper Ukrainska Pravda in the 2012 Ukrainian parliamentary election as a People's Deputy of Ukraine in Ukraine's 123rd electoral district, with his protests against Medvedchuk being noted. However, he ultimately was not a candidate in the election.

In the 2019 Ukrainian parliamentary election, Rushchyshyn was a candidate for People's Deputy of Ukraine in Ukraine's 117th electoral district, running as a member of Holos. At the time of his election, he was an independent. He was successful, defeating incumbent People's Deputy Oksana Yurynets with 25.12% of the vote to Yurynets' 23.77%. Following his election, he became secretary of the Verkhovna Rada Economic Development Committee.

Rushchyshyn unsuccessfully ran to be chair of the Lviv City Council, supported by Holos, in 2020.

Rushchyshyn was one of six People's Deputies to vote against ratifying the Istanbul Convention.

== Death ==
On 24 July 2025, Rushchyshyn was driving his motorcycle near Babukhiv in Ivano-Frankivsk Oblast in western Ukraine when he lost control of it and got involved in a collision. He died of his injuries soon afterwards at the age of 57.
