= Joseph Pavliv =

Joseph (Yosyp) Pavliv
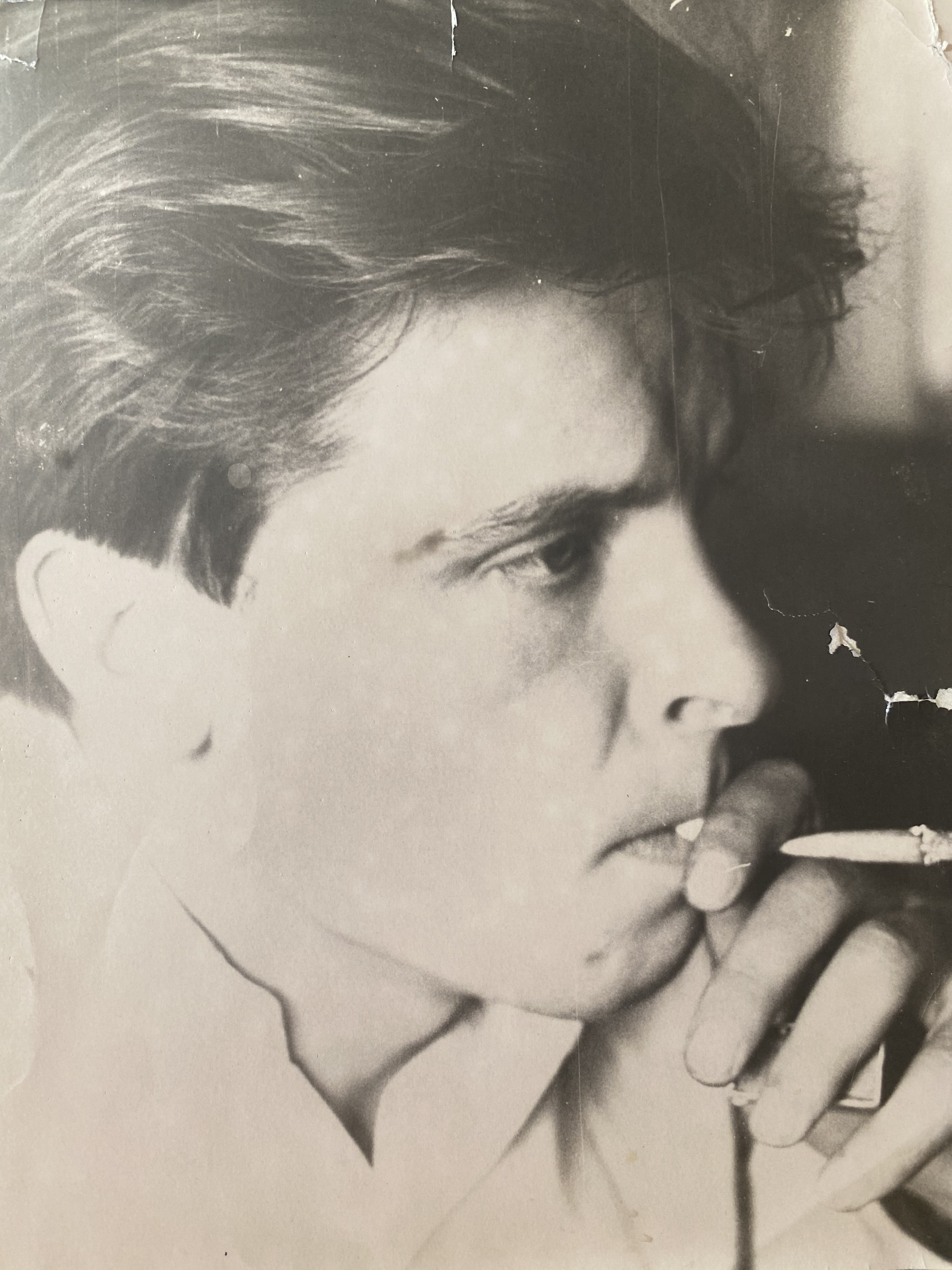
- Born: May 29, 1940; Dobrotvir, Lviv, Ukraine
- Died: November 10, 2008 (aged 68); Kyiv, Ukraine
- Resting place: Baikove Cemetery
- Education: Lviv Polytechnic National University Maxim Gorky Literature Institute
- Occupations: novelist, short-story writer
- Children: Halia Pavliva
- Writing career
- Language: Ukrainian, Russian, Polish, German
- Notable works: Kuzya, Tracking the Sable Cubs, Field Season, Forest Glades, Stories from Yakutia
- Notable awards: Coronation of the Word Publishers’ Choice Award

Signature
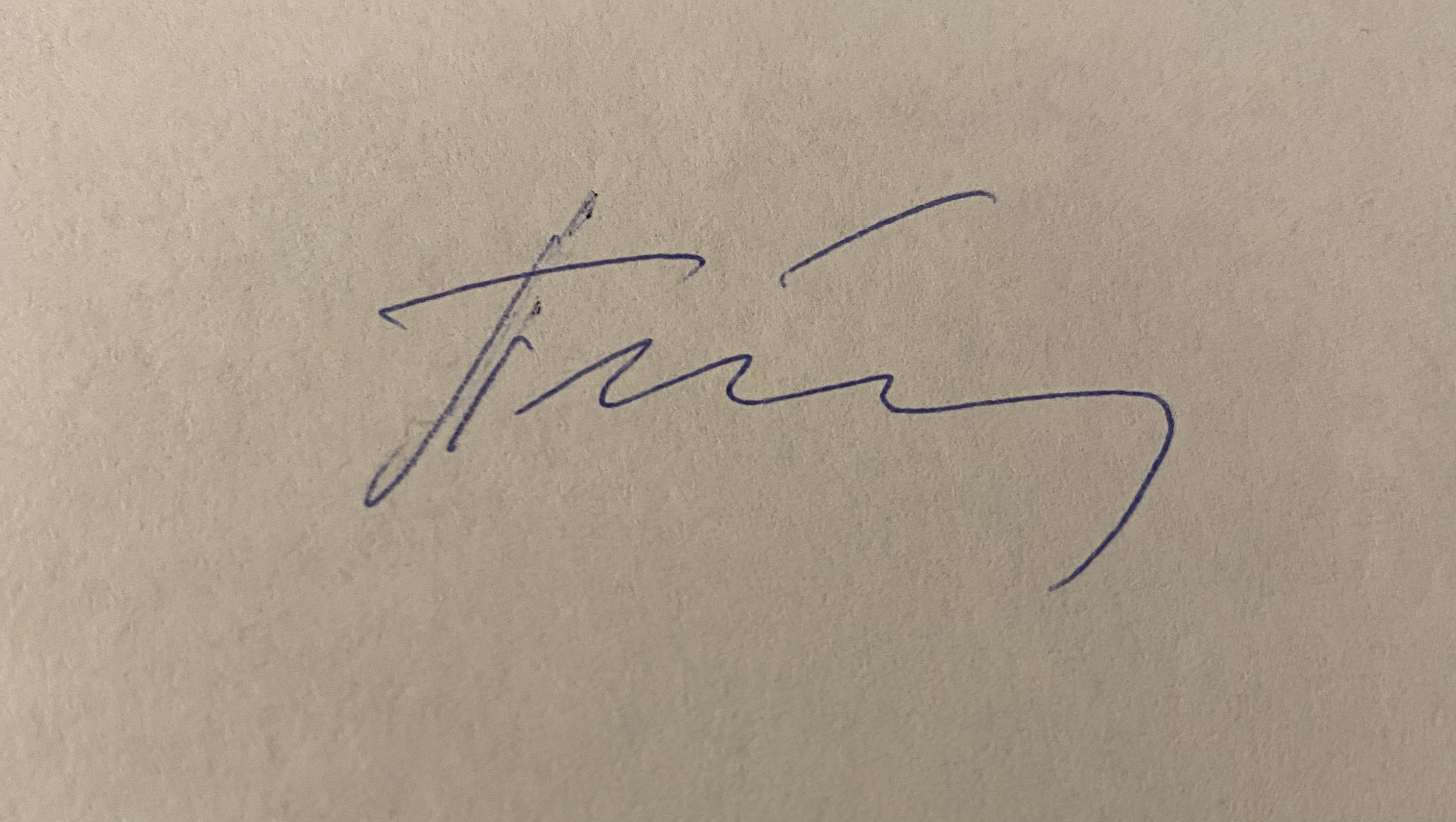

Joseph Pavliv (Ukrainian: Йосип Петрович Павлів Russian: Иосиф Петрович Павлив) (29 May 1940 – 10 November 2008) was a Ukrainian novelist and short-story writer.

== Early life and education ==
Joseph (Yosyp) Pavliv was born 29 May 1940, in the Dobrotvir village (now Kamyanka-Buzka region, near Lviv) to Petro Pavliv and Ustina Pavliv (née Gural). He was the youngest of seven children. In 1962, Pavliv graduated from the Lviv Polytechnic National University.

== Career ==
Following his graduation, Pavliv joined a scientific research expedition to Yakutia, where he worked until the late 1960s, becoming a pioneer of Yakutia’s literature of the 20th century.

One of his best known short novels, Field Season, was written in Oymyakon, the coldest inhabited settlement on Earth, where winter temperatures average −58 °F (−50 °C) (“Полевой Сезон” in Russian, “Борис Черняк та інші” in Ukrainian). In 1977, he graduated from the Maxim Gorky Literature Institute in Moscow, the only university for creative writing in the history of the Soviet Union. From the 1960s to 1980s, Pavliv was published by the major literary magazines of the country, including the «Polyatnaua Zvezda» (Polar Star) and the «Dal'nij Vostok» (Far East). During the 1970s and early 1980s he wrote for the Komsomolska Pravda newspaper. Pavliv’s work was published in Ukrainian literary magazines Dnipro and Ukraina.

He lived in Russia for over 20 years, particularly in Yakutia and the Far East in the Khabarovsk region, which is where he wrote one of his most notable works, Tracking the Sable Cubs. In the short novel, Pavliv writes about how unpredictable, fragile and unintelligible the human soul is, describing the beauty of nature in the North, and the nuances and dilemmas of human impact on it. Pavliv is the only author to ever work on the construction of the Baikal-Amur Mainline (BAM) in Russia as both a writer and an engineer. He joined Ukraine’s first BAM team sent to build the railway section in the Khabarovsk region in 1974 and lived there for more than a decade. His novel, The Adventures of Kuzia and His Human, takes place there. Kuzia was a Shiba Inu, a rare breed in Russia at the time.

After returning to Ukraine in 1985, at the time of Soviet leader Mikhail Gorbachev’s liberal policies of “perestroika” and “glasnost”, Pavliv invested himself in the rebirth of Ukrainian language, literature and folklore. A stoic reporter and wonderful storyteller, he covered communities throughout Chernihiv region for its biggest newspaper, Desnianska Pravda, for almost a decade before moving to Kyiv in the mid-1990s. Following the fall of the Soviet Union in 1991, he chose to stay in Ukraine, giving up the option of Russian citizenship and becoming a member of Ukraine’s Union of Creative Writers as well as the National Union of Journalists. In 2004 he moved to New York, but returned to Ukraine shortly after.

Joseph Pavliv died suddenly on November 10, 2008, near the Schaslyve village, outside of Kyiv. He is buried at the Baikove Cemetery in Kyiv, Ukraine. His works have been translated into English by Andrew Bromfield. Joseph Pavliv is the father of journalist Halia Pavliva.

== Awards and honors ==
In February 2009, The Adventures of Kuzia and His Human won the Publishers’ Choice Award of Coronation of the Word, the main literary contest in Ukraine.

== Selected works ==
- «Слідами соболят» (Tracking the Sable Cubs), Kyiv, publisher “Soviet Writer”, 1989.
- «Сніги цвітуть» (Flourishing Snow, collection of short stories), Molod (Youth) publishing house, Kyiv, 1985.
- повесть «Борис Черняк та інші (Boris Chernyak and others, short novel) Ukraine, Dnipro magazine № 1, 1984.
- рассказ «Хитрый бондарь» (Clever Cooper, short story), Far East magazine, Khabarovsk, Russia, № 1, 1988.
- «Полярная Звезда», № 5 (сентябрь-октябрь) 1972 г., повесть «Блики Севера» (Glare of the North, short novel), Polar Star literary magazine, 1972, № 5.
- Ukraine magazine, March 1986, № 12.
- Coronation of the Word, Ukraine’s national literary contest, 2009.

== Sources ==
- Павлів Йосип Петрович
