= Saint Michael Church, Lanivtsi =

Church in Ternopil Oblast, Ukraine

Coordinates: 48.8469°N 26.0023°E

Saint Michael Church
- Церква святого архистратига Михаїла
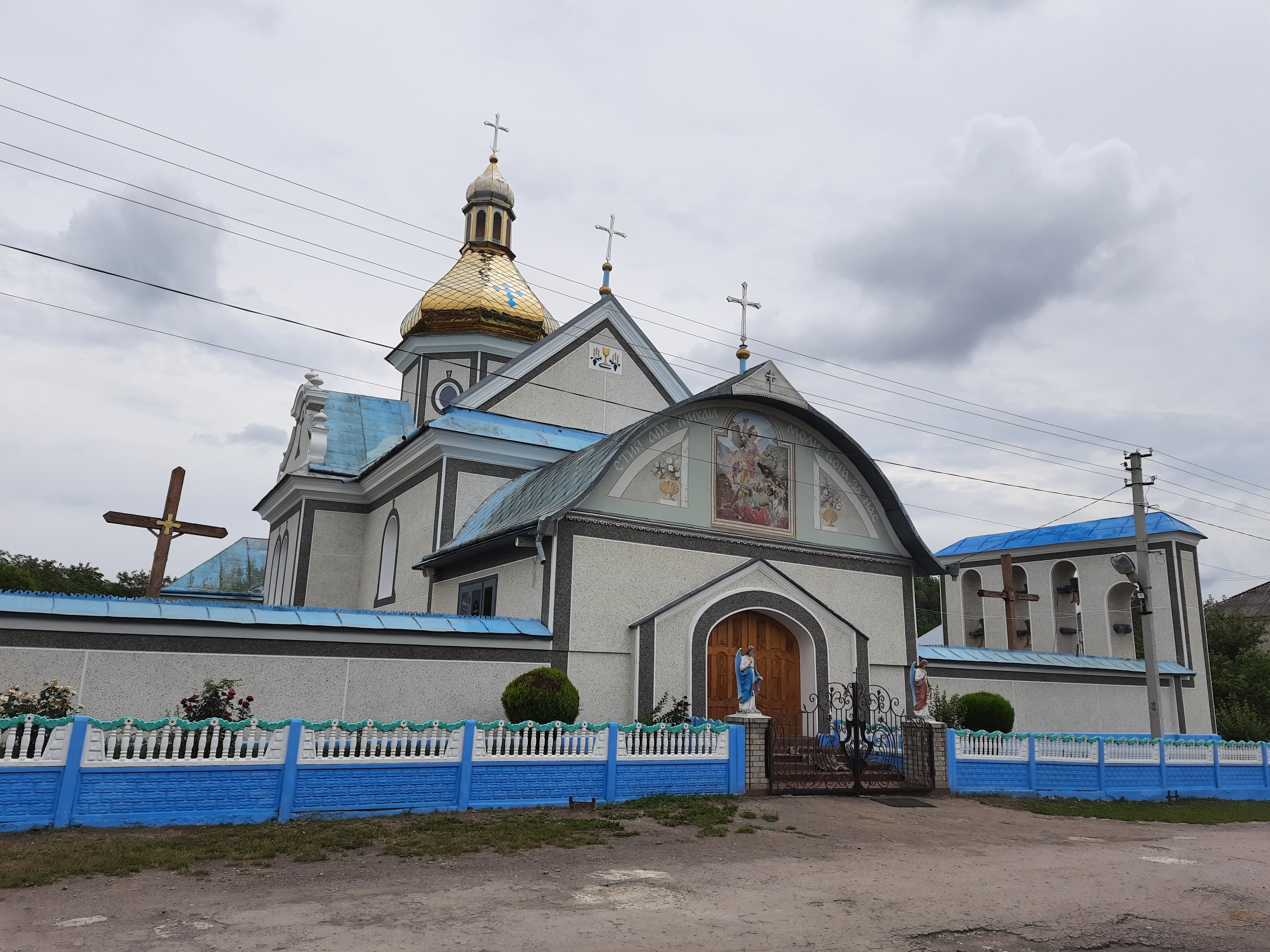
- Church of the UGCC

Religion
- Affiliation: Orthodox Church of Ukraine, Ukrainian Greek Catholic Church

Location
- Location: Lanivtsi, Borshchiv urban hromada, Chortkiv Raion, Ternopil Oblast, Ukraine
- Interactive map of Saint Michael Church

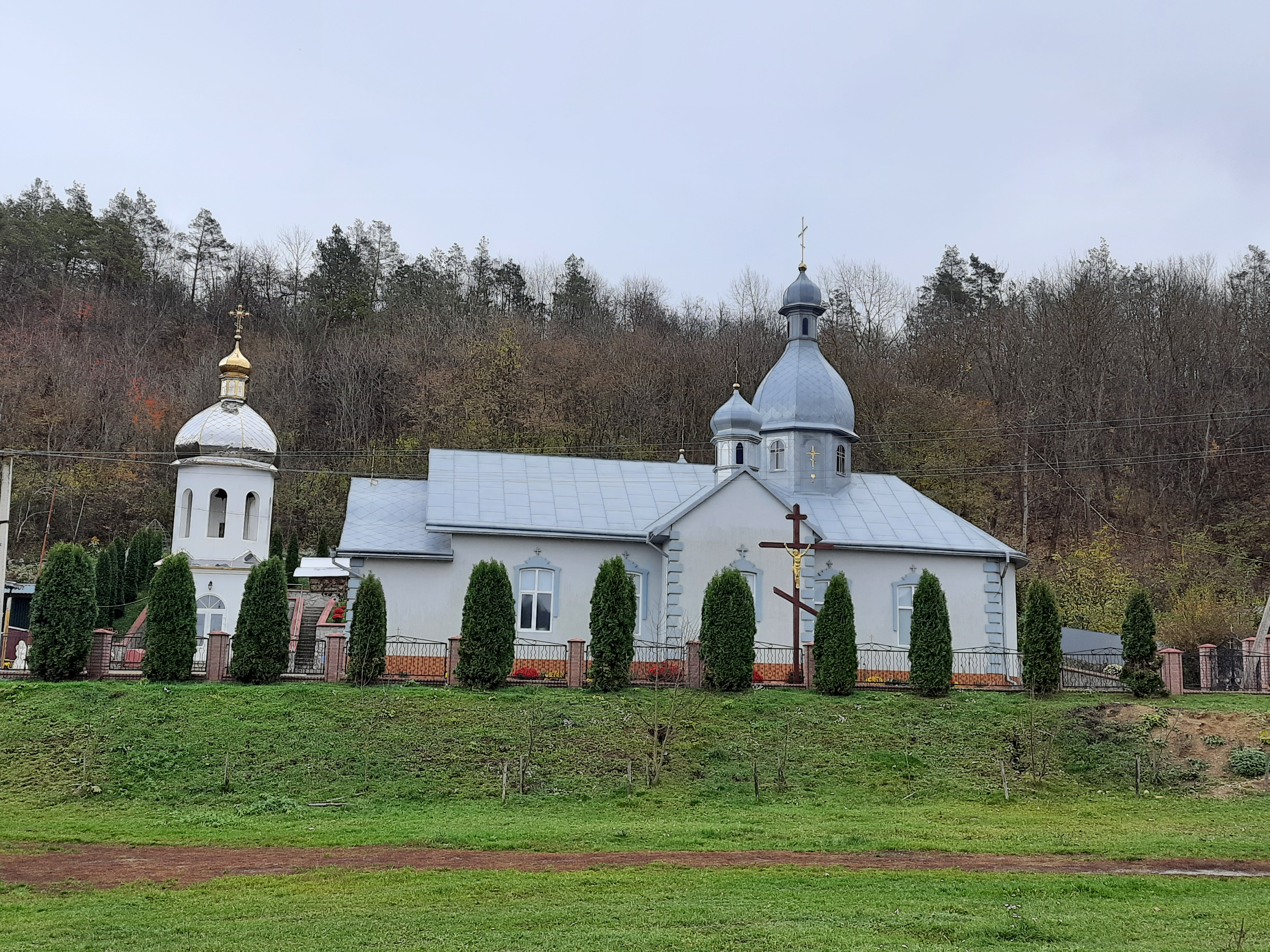
Church of the OCU

Saint Michael Church (Ukrainian: Церква святого архистратига Михаїла) is a parish of the same name of the Greek Catholic (UGCC) and Orthodox (OCU) communities in Lanivtsi, Borshchiv urban hromada, Chortkiv Raion, Ternopil Oblast.

== History ==
The wooden church in Lanivtsi was built in the middle of the eighteenth century. The street where the church was built, and later the village, was named Kozachchyna. In the same period, a monastery of the Order of St. Basil the Great was also built in the village, which existed until the reduction of 1783. Its abbot was Father Kornelii.

In 1785, the construction of a new stone Church of St. Michael began to replace the old wooden one. The construction was completed in 1802, during the service of the priest Father Vasyl (Bazylii) Lukashevych.

In 1898, with the assistance of Father O. Ulanytskyi, a monastery of the Sisters Servants of the Immaculate Virgin Mary was founded in the village. Its founder was Princess Teresa Sapeha, who donated a spacious house with a large plot of land. Eleven sisters settled in the monastery.

The miraculous icon of the Lanivtsi Blessed Virgin Mary was consecrated by Metropolitan Andrey Sheptytsky. The pilgrimage was restored in 2011.

On August 18, 1907, a branch of the Ukrainian Patriotic Union "Sokil" and the "Silskyi Hospodar" society were founded in the village, led by Father O. Ulanytskyi. On February 11, 1921, Father Oleksii Hunovskyi, a well-known composer and active public figure, was appointed as the parish priest. With his assistance, the Prosvita society was restored in 1933, and he became its head.

When the communist offensive against the UGCC began, Father O. Hunovskyi moved to the village of Dora. In 1946, the Greek Catholic parish and the Church of St. Michael were closed by the authorities. Many priests who were natives of the village—Father Vasyl Zharyi, Father Ivan-Markiian Baraniuk, and Father Mykhailo Kysil—were deported to Siberian camps. After their release in the 1950s, these priests continued to serve secretly despite the danger.

In 1990, the parish and the church returned to the UGCC. Father Mykhailo Kysil performed services in his native church, but due to poor health, he was replaced in 1991 by Father Yaroslav Havryshev, who served until 2002.

In October 2002, Father Havryshev attempted to convert the Greek Catholic parish to Orthodoxy. The confrontation lasted until the summer of 2003, when the village council transferred the old clubhouse to the Orthodox community. From the fall of 2002 to the present day, Father Ivan Sabala has been the pastor of the Greek Catholic community. Thanks to his work, interfaith harmony has been restored in the village.

The Greek Catholic parish has the Pope's Worldwide Prayer Network brotherhood and the Association of the Living Rosary community. A memorial plaque in honor of Father Oleksandr Ulianytskyi and Father Oleksii Hunovskyi has been installed on the church's facade.

== Sources ==
- (in Ukrainian) Т. Глова, Б. Мельничук, Н. Мизак, Б. Петраш, Г. Івахів, Ланівці // Ternopil Oblast. History of cities and villages: in 3 v. / Ternopil: "Terno-graph", 2014, V. 1: А—В, S. 525—527. — ISBN 978-966-457-228-3.
- "Łanowce". Geographical Dictionary of the Kingdom of Poland (in Polish). 5. Warszawa: Kasa im. Józefa Mianowskiego. 1884. p. 585.
