= Zapytiv =

Rural locality in Lviv Oblast, Ukraine

Zapytiv Запитів
- Rural settlement
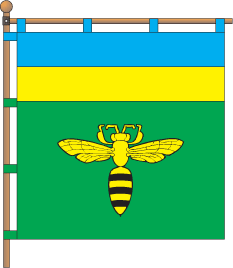
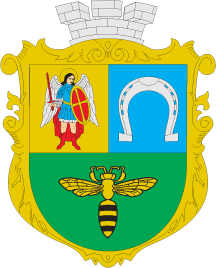
- Flag Coat of arms

- Location in Lviv Oblast Location in Ukraine
- Coordinates: 49°54′58″N 24°12′24″E
- Country: Ukraine
- Oblast: Lviv Oblast
- Raion: Lviv Raion
- Hromada: Zapytiv settlement hromada

Population (2022)
  - Total: 2,979
- Time zone: UTC+2 (EET)
  - Summer (DST): UTC+3 (EEST)

Zapytiv (Ukrainian: Запитів, Polish: Zapytów) is a rural settlement in Lviv Raion of Lviv Oblast in Ukraine. It is essentially a suburb of Lviv and is located northeast of the city, about 5 kilometres (3.1 mi) from its bypass. It belongs to Novyi Yarychiv settlement hromada, one of the hromadas of Ukraine. Population: 2,979 (2022 estimate).

== History ==
Until 18 July 2020, Zapytiv belonged to Kamianka-Buzka Raion. The raion was abolished in July 2020 as part of the administrative reform of Ukraine, which reduced the number of raions of Lviv Oblast to seven. The area of Kamianka-Buzka Raion was split between Chervonohrad and Lviv raions, with Zapytiv being transferred to Lviv Raion.

Until 26 January 2024, Zapytiv was designated urban-type settlement. On this day, a new law entered into force which abolished this status, and Zapytiv became a rural settlement.

== Economy ==
=== Transport ===
Zapytiv railway station, located in the settlement, is on the railway which connects Lviv with Kovel via Chervonohrad and Volodymyr and with Lutsk.

The settlement is on Highway M06 connecting Lviv and Kyiv.
