= Oleksandr Kovalchuk =

Ukrainian politician

- Олександр Ковальчук
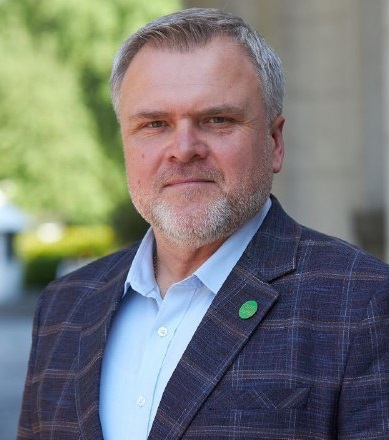

Member of the Verkhovna Rada
- Incumbent
- Assumed office 29 August 2019

Personal details
- Born: Oleksandr Volodymyrovych Kovalchuk; 5 February 1974 (age 52) Novohrad-Volynskyi, Zhytomyr Oblast, Ukrainian SSR, USSR
- Party: Servant of the People
- Education: Lviv University of Trade and Economics; University of Minnesota; Cuyahoga Community College

Oleksandr Volodymyrovych Kovalchuk (Ukrainian: Олександр Володимирович Ковальчук; born 5 February 1974) is a Ukrainian public figure and politician. He serves as People's Deputy of Ukraine of the 9th convocation. He serves as Deputy Chairman of the Verkhovna Rada Committee on Finance, Tax, and Customs Policy. He is a Deputy Member of the Permanent Delegation to the Parliamentary Assembly of the Council of Europe. He is a member of the Political Council of the "Servant of the People" party. Outside of politics, he served as chairman of the board, co-founder of the NGO «Interaction platform "Prostir"».

== Early life ==
Kovalchuk was born on 5 February 1974 in Novohrad-Volynskyi, which was then part of the Ukrainian SSR. From 1981 to 1991 he attended Secondary School No. 5 in Novogrod-Volynskyi. Afterward, from 1991 to 1995, he studied at the Lviv University of Trade and Economics, graduating with a degree in economics and finance. He then worked as the Director of the Yarun Trade and Commercial Association in the Novograd-Volynskyi district from 1995 to 1997. Afterward, for a year, he did international studies in agricultural training at the University of Minnesota through the MAST International Programme. He moved to the United States after this, working from 1999 to 2007 in various IT companies like Target and Adamant Computers, and then became the co-owner of the company Azatek and GTD. Meanwhile, while working, he went to Cuyahoga Community College from 2000 to 2002, majoring in foreign languages and the social sphere.

== Personal life ==
He lives in the city of Rivne.
