= Fylymon Kurchaba =

Fylymon Kurchaba, C.Ss.R.
- Ukrainian Catholic Archeparchy of Lviv (auxiliary)
- Church: Ukrainian Greek Catholic Church
- Appointed: 23 February 1985
- In office: 23 February 1985 – 26 October 1995
- Other posts: Protohegumen of the Province of Redemptorists of Lviv (1950–1990); Rector of the Theological Seminary in Lviv (1990–1991)

Orders
- Ordination: 25 July 1937 (Priest) by Bl. Nicholas Charnetsky
- Consecration: 23 February 1985 (Bishop) by Volodymyr Sterniuk

Personal details
- Born: Fylymon Kurchaba; 21 December 1911 Zhelekhiv Velykyi, Austrian-Hungarian Empire, now Ukraine
- Died: 26 October 1995 (aged 83) Lviv, Ukraine

Fylymon Kurchaba, C.Ss.R. (Ukrainian: Филимон Курчаба; 21 December 1911 – 26 October 1995) was a Ukrainian Greek Catholic hierarch. He was clandestine auxiliary bishop of the Ukrainian Catholic Archeparchy of Lviv from 1985 (from 16 January 1991 as titular bishop of Abrittum) until his death in 1995.

Born in Zhelekhiv Velykyi, Austrian-Hungarian Empire (present-day – Velykosilka, Lviv Raion, Lviv Oblast, Ukraine) on 1911 in the Greek-Catholic peasant family and on 1931 joined the missionary Congregation of the Most Holy Redeemer. He was professed on 15 September 1932, solemn professed on 28 August 1935 and was ordained a priest on 25 July 1937 by Blessed Bishop Nicholas Charnetsky, C.Ss.R. during his studies in Belgium. After ordination he served in the different Redemptorist monasteries in the Western Ukraine.

During 1948–1950 he was arrested, because the Communist regime abolished the Greek-Catholic Church and detained in the Univ Lavra, former monastery, that become a Soviet concentration camp. After release from 1950 until 1990 Fr. Kurchaba was a Protohegumen of the Province of Redemptorists of Lviv (until 1989 it was a vice-province). In 23 February 1985 he was consecrated to the Episcopate as auxiliary bishop of the Ukrainian Catholic Archeparchy of Lviv. The principal and single consecrator was clandestine Archbishop Volodymyr Sterniuk.

In 1990–1991 he served as the rector of the Theological Seminary in Lviv. On 16 January 1991 Pope John Paul II appointed him as a titular bishop of Abrittum.

He died in Lviv on 26 October 1995.

Catholic Church titles
Preceded by Ivan Chornyak	Rector of the Major Theological Seminary in Lviv; 1990–1991	Succeeded by Yulian Voronovskyi
Preceded by Cletus F. O'Donnell	Titular Bishop of Abrittum; 1991–1995	Succeeded by Ján Eugen Kočiš
