= Didyliv =

Didyliv Дідилів
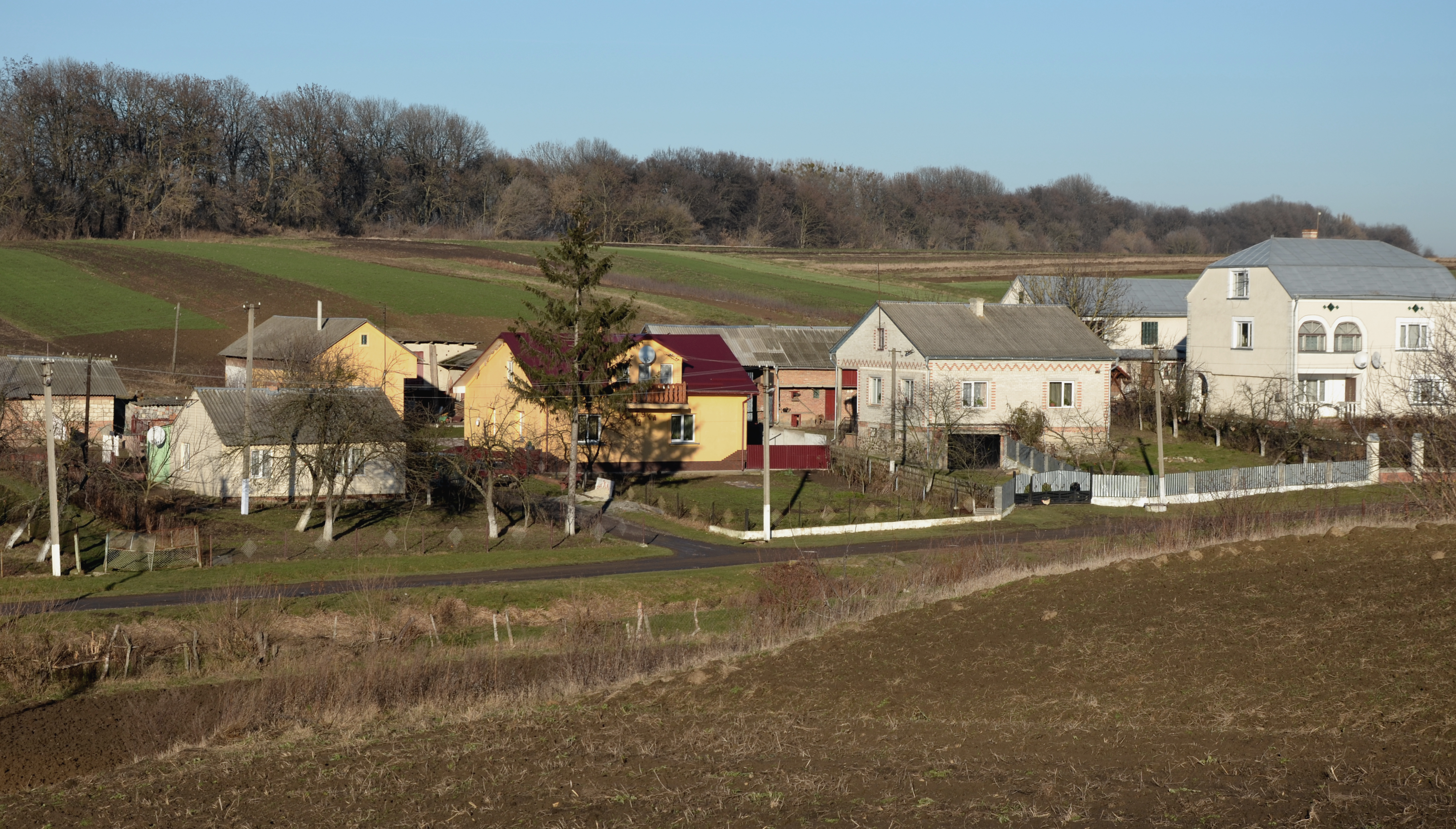

- Location in Lviv Oblast
- Coordinates: 49°56′0″N 24°21′48″E
- Country: Ukraine
- Oblast: Lviv Oblast
- Raion: Lviv Raion
- Hromada: Novyi Yarychiv Hromada
- Postal code: 80462

Didyliv (Ukrainian: Дідилів) is a village in Novyi Yarychiv settlement hromada, Lviv Raion, Lviv Oblast, Ukraine.

== History ==
A document dated 22 January 1398, in which Jan of Tarnów, voivode of Sandomierz and starosta of Rus, states that Wojciech of Sulymów exchanged the village of Didyliv for 2 villages of Paszko of Jaryczów: Dnovo and Drohoshiv.

== Religion ==
- Church of the Resurrection (1933, UGCC)

== People ==
- Petro Bakovych (1893–1978), Captain of the Army of the Ukrainian People's Republic and the Ukrainian Galician Army, and regional commander of the Ukrainian Military Organization
- Oleksii Hunovskyi (1882–1961), Ukrainian Greek Catholic priest, composer, public figure, educator, political prisoner, and head of the Chortkiv District National Council of the ZUNR
