= Dobrotvir settlement hromada =

Hromada in Lviv Oblast, Ukraine

Dobrotvir settlement hromada Добротвірська селищна громада
- Hromada
- Seal
- Interactive map of Dobrotvir settlement hromada
- Country: Ukraine
- Oblast: Lviv Oblast
- Raion: Sheptytskyi Raion
- Admin. center: Dobrotvir

Area
  - Total: 2,064 km^{2} (797 sq mi)

Population (2021)
  - Total: 11,413
  - Density: 5.530/km^{2} (14.32/sq mi)
- CATOTTG code: UA46120050000027080
- Settlements: 20
- Rural settlements: 1
- Villages: 19
- Website: dobrotvirska-gromada.gov.ua

Dobrotvir settlement hromada (Ukrainian: Добротвірська селищна громада) is a hromada in Ukraine, in Sheptytskyi Raion of Lviv Oblast. The administrative center is the rural settlement of Dobrotvir.

== Settlements ==
The hromada consists of 1 rural settlement (Dobrotvir) and 19 villages:

- Hriada
- Dolyny
- Dolyny
- Kozaky
- Koshakovski
- Maziarnia-Karanska
- Maiky
- Matiashi
- Neznaniv
- Perekalky
- Polonychna
- Rohali
- Rokety
- Silets
- Staryi Dobrotvir
- Stryhanka
- Tartak
- Tychok
- Tyshytsia
