= Museum of Ethnography and Crafts, Lviv =

Museum in Lviv, Ukraine

Museum of Ethnography and Crafts
- Музей етнографії та художнього промислу (Ukrainian)
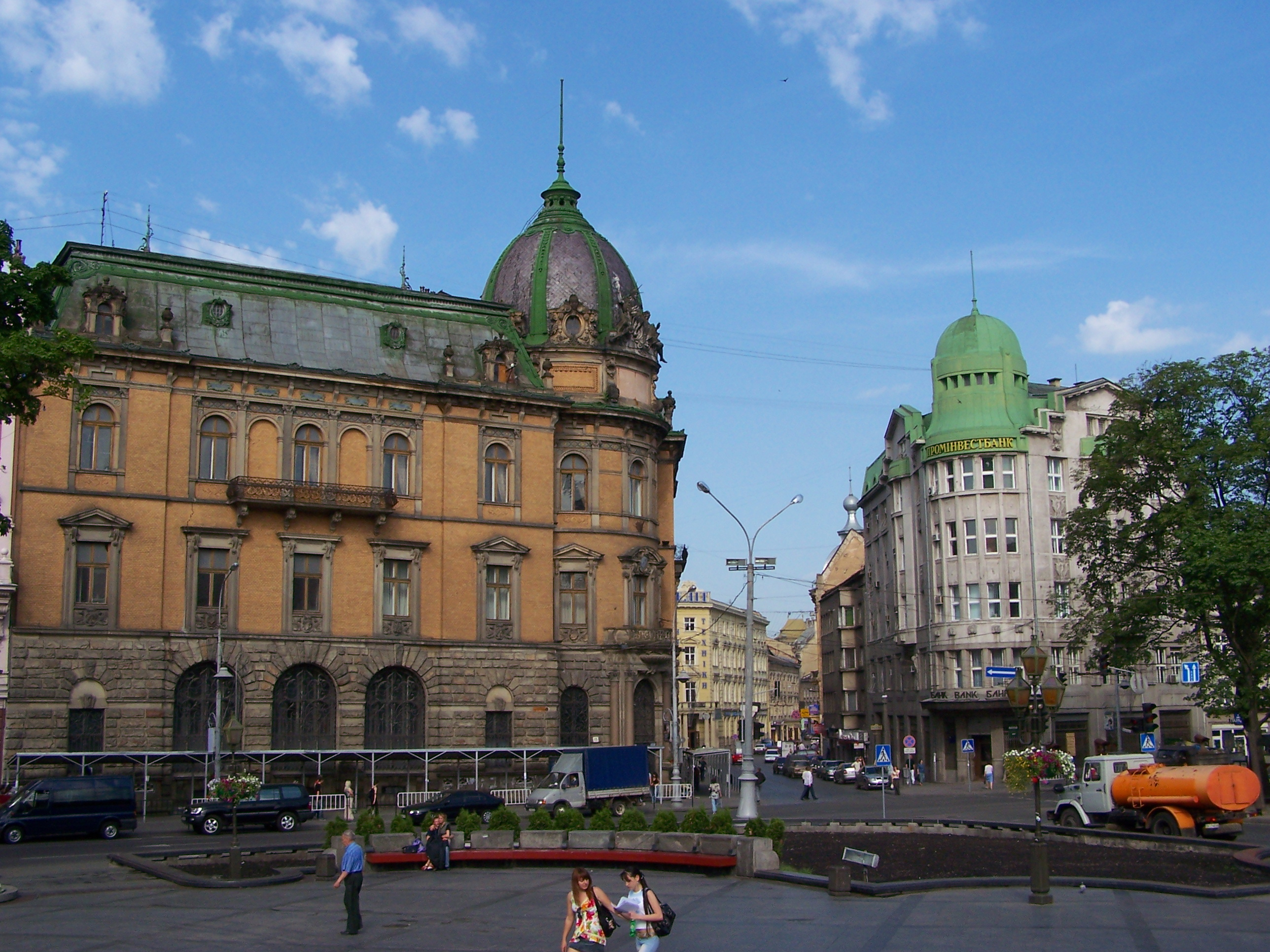
- Museum of Ethnography and Crafts in Lviv

- Location within Lviv Location within Ukraine
- Established: 1951
- Location: 15 Svobody Avenue, Lviv, Ukraine
- Coordinates: 49°50′28″N 24°01′38″E

The Museum of Ethnography and Arts and Crafts of the Institute of Ethnology of the National Academy of Sciences of Ukraine is the only museum of ethnography in Ukraine that is subordinated to the Institute of Ethnology of the National Academy of Sciences of Ukraine.

== History ==
Established in 1951 in Lviv under the name State Museum of Ethnography and Arts and Crafts of the Academy of Sciences of the Ukrainian SSR, it was founded on the basis of the Museum of Ethnography of the Lviv Branch of the Academy of Sciences of the Ukrainian SSR (formerly the Museum of Shevchenko Scientific Society) and the Lviv State Museum of Arts and Crafts (formerly the Municipal Museum of Artistic Crafts). In 1940, these collections were supplemented with holdings from nationalized former public and private museums (National Museum, the Lubomirski Museum, the Dzieduszycki Museum, the women's gymnasium of the Basilian Sisters, and the ethnographic collection of Aleksander Prusiewicz).

== Museum Building ==
The building at 24 Svobody Avenue was purposefully constructed in 1891 for a museum of ethnographic items. The collections of the Lviv Municipal Museum were housed there. In 1939, the museum was renamed the Museum of Arts and Crafts. During the Soviet period, in 1951, the Museum of Arts and Crafts was moved out of the building, which was taken over by the newly created V. I. Lenin Museum in Lviv. At the same time, in 1951, all the collections of the Museum of Arts and Crafts were moved to the building of the former Galician Savings Bank (15 Svobody Avenue), which was once created by the famous Lviv architect of the historicism era, Julian Zachariewicz (1837–1898), the author of Lviv Polytechnic, the synagogue in Chernivtsi, and Count Adam Gołuchowski's castle in the town of Husiatyn.

Since then, the modern Museum of Ethnography and Arts and Crafts has been located in the building of the former Galician Credit Bank.

The building stands out for its romantic interpretation of Neo-Renaissance and Neo-Baroque motifs. The architect and builders actively used the textural features and color of the available materials: polychrome brick from the Upper Rhine, hewn Ternopil stone, majolica reliefs, and forged metal grilles produced by the Jan Daszek factory. The vestibule was designed in a bright and expressive way, tiled with polychrome tiles, decorated with panels of colored stone and stained-glass windows from the "Tiroler Glasmalerei" company from Innsbruck. The interiors and facade of the building are decorated with works from the sculptural workshop of Leonard Marconi. The building is crowned with a dome and a spire; at the base of the dome, there is an allegorical sculptural group symbolizing the economic prosperity of Galicia.

== Gallery ==
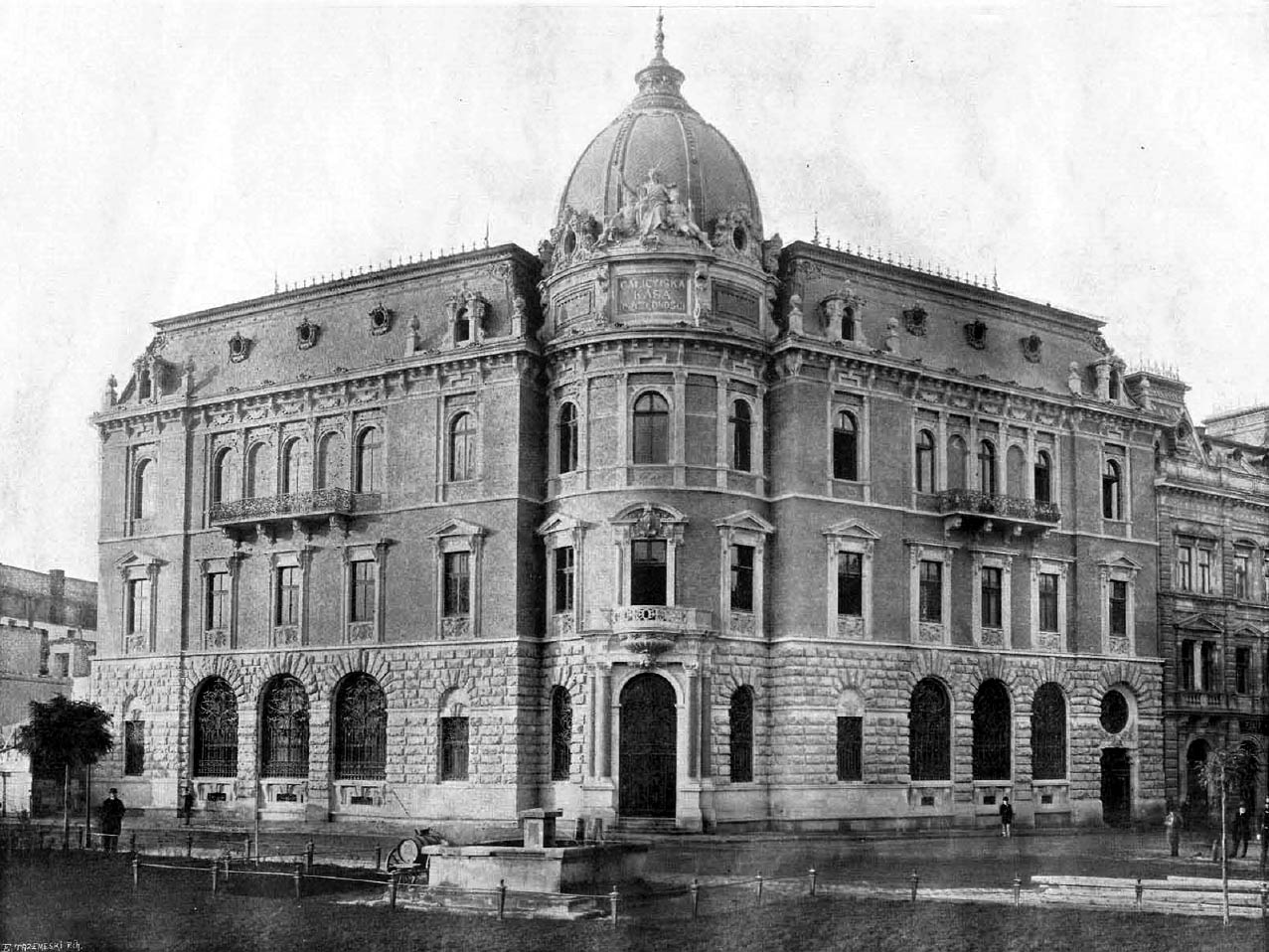
Galician Savings Bank in 1900, archive photo

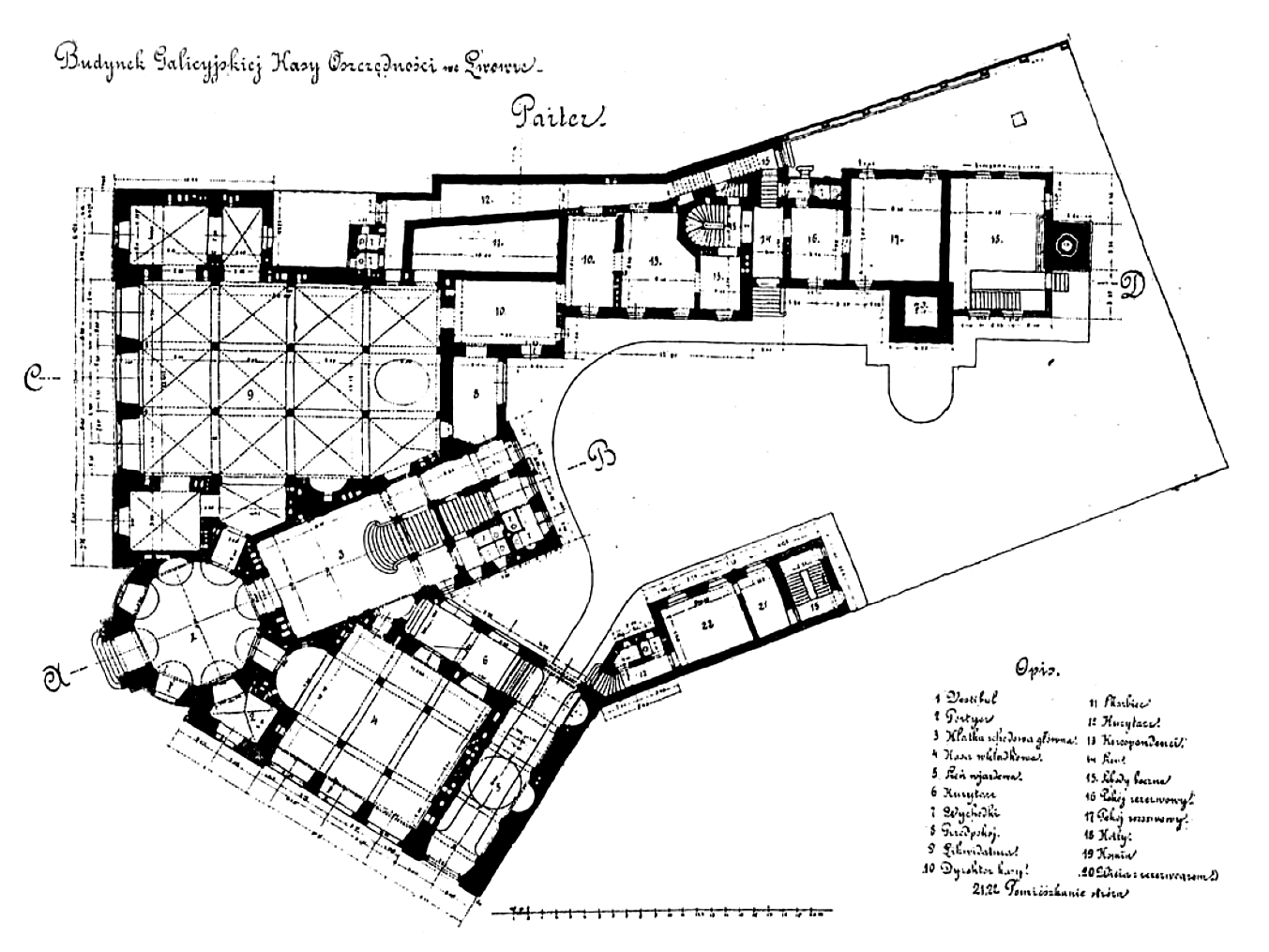
Ground plan of the building

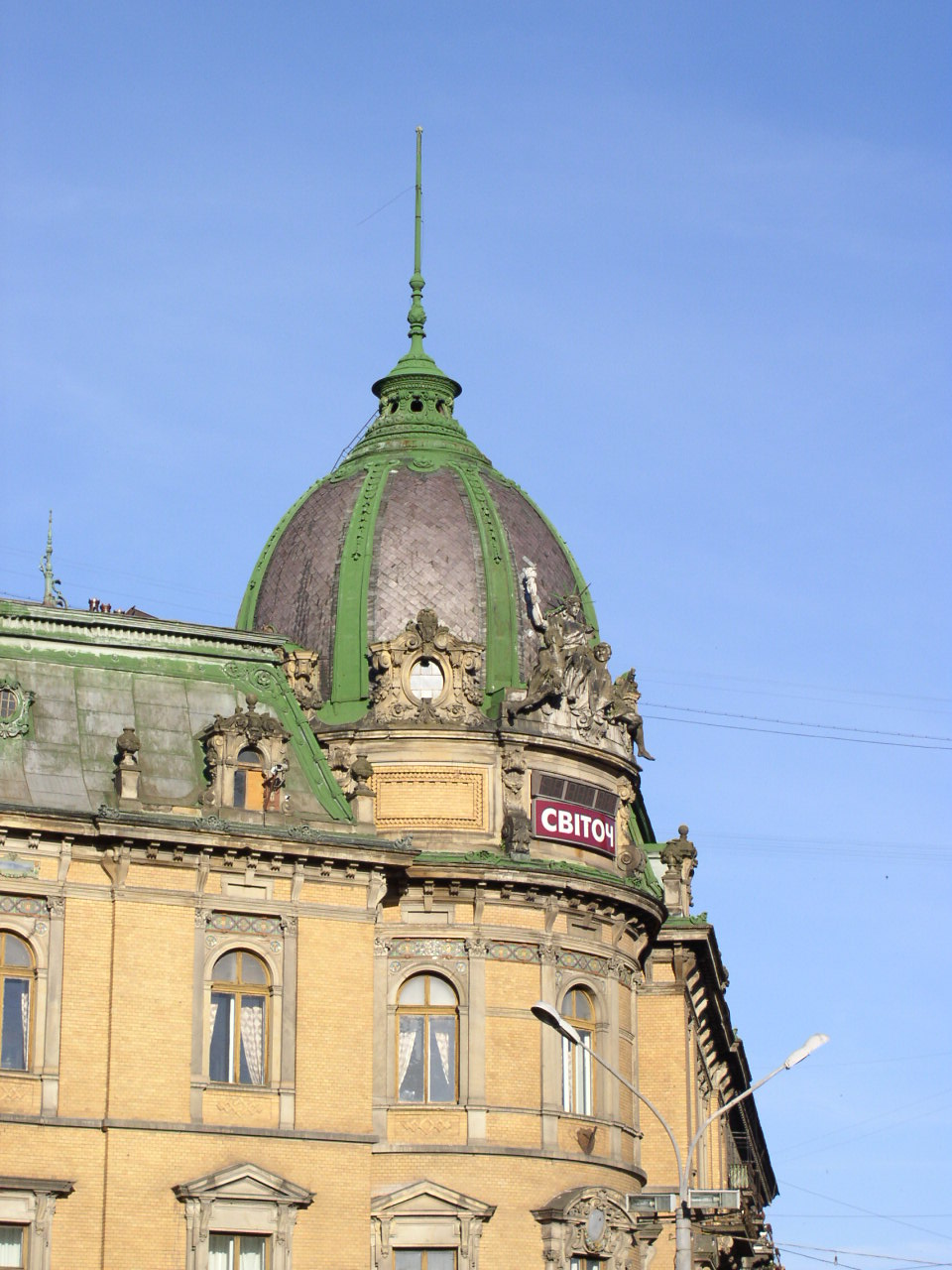
Building dome with a spire and the allegorical sculpture "Oshchadnist"

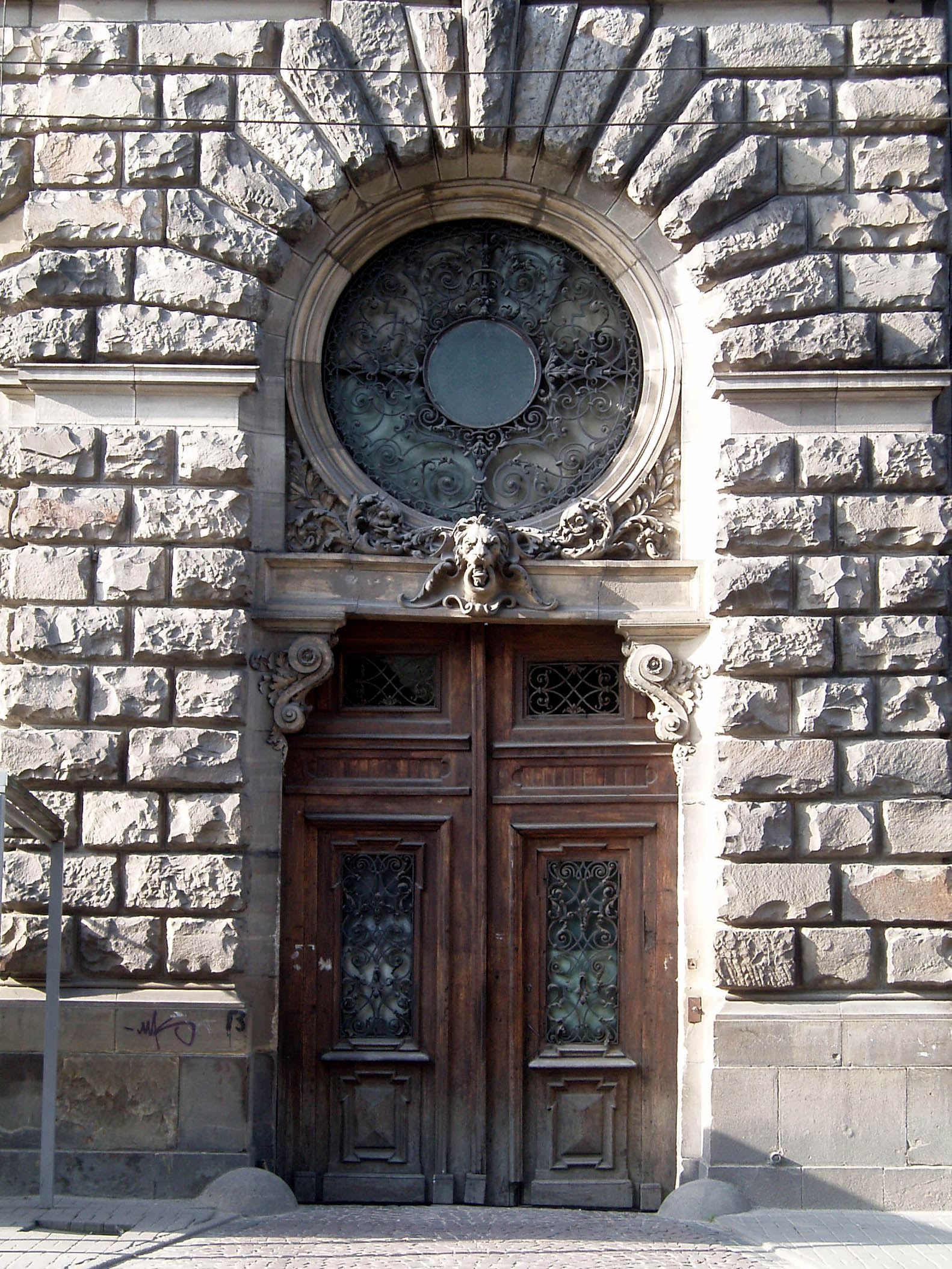
Portal with a window and artistic grille

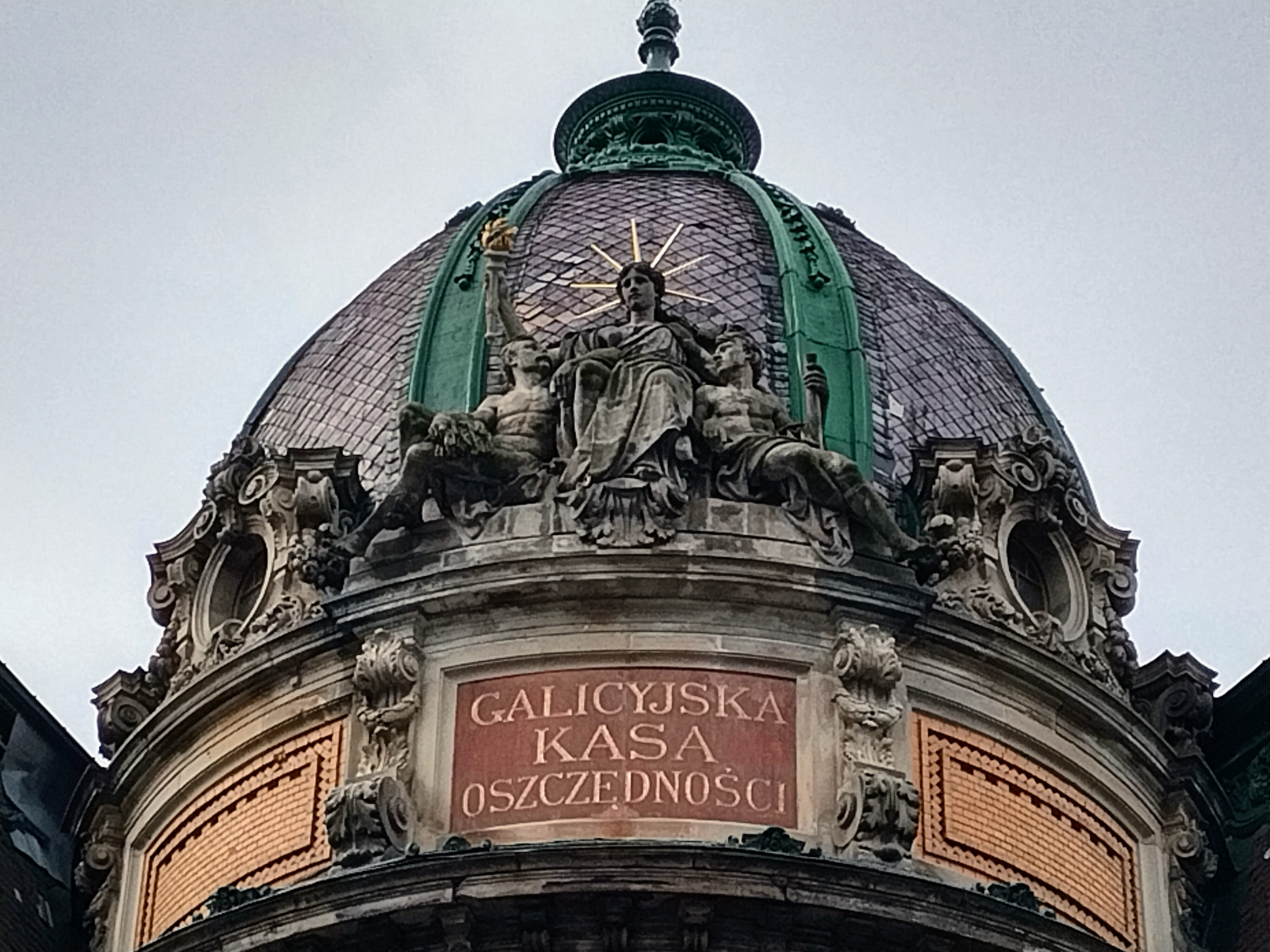
Sculpture "Oshchadnist"

== Exposition ==
The exposition is divided into two departments: ethnographic (over 44,000 exhibits) and arts and crafts (over 28,000 exhibits).

One of the most numerous collections in the museum is the collection of Ukrainian national clothing.

For a long time, the Museum of Ethnography and Arts and Crafts in Lviv was the only museum in Ukraine that preserved Coptic textiles — products of the first Christians of Northern Egypt who preserved the basics of the language of the ancient Egyptians. Only the Khanenko Museum in Kyiv has a meager number of Coptic textiles.

Another unique collection in Ukraine is the large collection of furniture, with items spanning six hundred years (from the 15th to the 20th century).

During the creation of the collections, attention was paid to gathering purely Ukrainian materials — ceramics from local centers, weaving, embroidery, wood carving, and so on. To collect new exhibits, both usual expeditions to villages and events of the region's artistic life are used, for example, cultural and folklore events at the Singing Field in the city of Ternopil.

== Publications ==
The museum published "Materials on Ethnography and Art History" (1955-1963), albums (folk clothing, carving, etc.), and individual works (K. Mateiko "Folk Ceramics of the Western Regions of the Ukrainian SSR of the 19th-20th centuries," V. F. Rozhankivskyi "Ukrainian Artistic Glass", L. Sukha "Artistic Metal Products of Ukrainians of the Eastern Carpathians", A. Budzan "Wood Carving in the Western Regions of Ukraine", Y. Zapasko "Ornamental Design of the Ukrainian Manuscript Book," I. Seniv "The Works of O. L. Kulchytska", etc.), organizes periodic exhibitions, and from 1955, has a permanent exhibition "Life of the Ukrainian People" from the 16th century.

In 1976, the "Mystetstvo" publishing house released an album with 400 color and black-and-white illustrations representing masterpieces of Ukrainian decorative and applied art collected at the Museum of Ethnography and Crafts.

The album "Treasures of the Museum of Ethnography and Arts and Crafts of the Institute of Ethnology of the National Academy of Sciences of Ukraine". Authors Stepan Pavliuk and Roman Chmelyk. — Lviv: Institute of Ethnology of the National Academy of Sciences of Ukraine, 2005. 228 p.

== Bibliography ==
- Muzei etnohrafii ta khudozhnoho promyslu / S. P. Pavliuk // Encyclopedia of Modern Ukraine [Online] / Eds. : I. М. Dziuba, A. I. Zhukovsky, M. H. Zhelezniak [et al.] ; National Academy of Sciences of Ukraine, Shevchenko Scientific Society. – Kyiv : The NASU institute of Encyclopedic Research, 2020.
- Енциклопедія українознавства : Словникова частина : [в 11 т.] / Наукове товариство імені Шевченка ; гол. ред. проф., д-р Володимир Кубійович. — Париж — Нью-Йорк : Молоде життя, 1955—1995. — ISBN 5-7707-4049-3.
- Л. Д. Федорова. Музей етнографії та художнього промислу // Енциклопедія історії України : у 10 т. / редкол.: В. А. Смолій (голова) та ін. ; Інститут історії України НАН України. — К. : Наукова думка, 2010. — Т. 7 : Мл — О. — С. 107. — ISBN 978-966-00-1061-1.
- Е. М. Піскова. Музей наукового товариства імені Шевченка // Енциклопедія історії України : у 10 т. / редкол.: В. А. Смолій (голова) та ін. ; Інститут історії України НАН України. — К. : Наукова думка, 2010. — Т. 7 : Мл — О. — С. 111. — ISBN 978-966-00-1061-1.
