= Dobrotvir =

Rural locality in Lviv Oblast, Ukraine

Dobrotvir Добротвір
- Rural settlement
- Coat of arms

- Location in Lviv Oblast Location in Ukraine
- Coordinates: 50°12′26″N 24°23′06″E
- Country: Ukraine
- Oblast: Lviv Oblast
- Raion: Sheptytskyi Raion
- Hromada: Dobrotvir settlement hromada

Population (2022)
  - Total: 6,339
- Time zone: UTC+2 (EET)
  - Summer (DST): UTC+3 (EEST)

Dobrotvir (Ukrainian: Добротвір, Polish: Dobrotwór) is a rural settlement in Sheptytskyi Raion of Lviv Oblast in Ukraine. The settlement is located on the left bank of the Western Bug, which is dammed here forming Dobrotvir Reservoir. It hosts the administration of Dobrotvir settlement hromada, one of the hromadas of Ukraine. Population: 6,339 (2022 estimate).

== History ==
Until 18 July 2020, Dobrotvir belonged to Kamianka-Buzka Raion. The raion was abolished in July 2020 as part of the administrative reform of Ukraine, which reduced the number of raions of Lviv Oblast to seven. The area of Kamianka-Buzka Raion was split between Chervonohrad and Lviv raions, with Dobrotvir being transferred to Chervonohrad Raion (modern Sheptytskyi Raion).

Until 26 January 2024, Dobrotvir was designated urban-type settlement. On this day, a new law entered into force which abolished this status, and Dobrotvir became a rural settlement.

== Economy ==
=== Transportation ===
Dobrotvir railway station is in the village of Koshakovski, about 2 kilometres (1.2 mi) west of the settlement. It is on the railway which connects Lviv with Kovel via Chervonohrad and Volodymyr.

The settlement has road access to Highway H17 connecting Lviv and Lutsk.
