= Lanivtsi, Chortkiv Raion =

Lanivtsi Ланівці
- Village
- Location in Ukraine Lanivtsi (Ukraine)
- Coordinates: 48°50′40″N 26°00′05″E
- Country: Ukraine
- Oblast: Ternopil Oblast
- District: Chortkiv Raion

Population
  - Total: 1,169
- Time zone: UTC+2 (EET)
  - Summer (DST): UTC+3 (EEST)
- Postal code: 48716

Lanivtsi (Ukrainian: Ланівці, Polish: Łanowce), a village in Ukraine, is located within Chortkiv Raion of Ternopil Oblast. It belongs to Borshchiv urban hromada, one of the hromadas of Ukraine.

== Religion ==
- Saint Michael church (1802, UGCC; 2003, OCU)
