= Institute of Ethnology =

Institute of Ethnology of the National Academy of Sciences of Ukraine
- Інститут народознавства НАН України
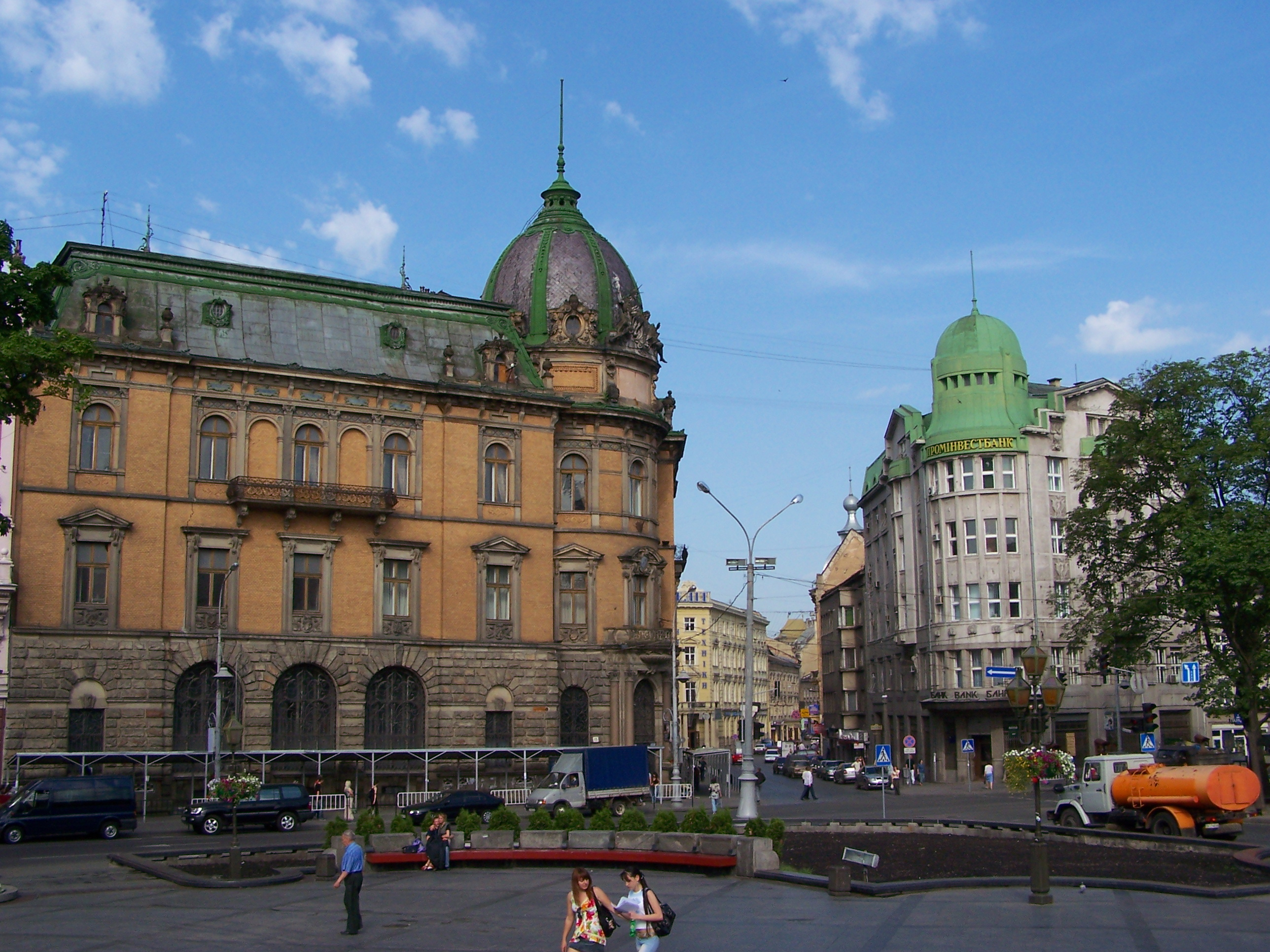
- Formation: 1992
- Type: Research Institute
- Headquarters: 15 Svobody Avenue, Lviv
- Location: Ukraine
- Parent organization: National Academy of Sciences of Ukraine
- Website: ethnology.lviv.ua

The Institute of Ethnology (Ukrainian: Інститут народознавства) is a leading research institution in Ukraine, operating under the auspices of the National Academy of Sciences of Ukraine (NASU). Located in Lviv, it specializes in the study of ethnology, anthropology, and art history.

== History ==
The institute was officially established in 1992 based on the Lviv branch of the Rylsky Institute of Art Studies, Folklore and Ethnology, which had existed since 1964. It is headed by Professor Stepan Pavliuk.

== Structure and activities ==
The Institute manages the Museum of Ethnography and Crafts in Lviv (Ukrainian: Музей етнографії та художнього промислу). The museum's holdings are organized into 17 specialized collections, which contain more than 83,000 individual artifacts.

The main research areas include:

- The ethnogenesis and historical development of the Ukrainian nation.
- Traditional culture and folk art.
- Modern ethno-social processes in Ukraine and abroad.

== Publications ==
From 1995, the Institute has published the academic journal The Ethnology Notebooks (Ukrainian: Narodoznavchi Zoshyty), which is one of the primary peer-reviewed journals for ethnological research in Ukraine.
