= Mayor of Rivne =

The following is a list of mayors of the city of Rivne, Ukraine. It includes positions equivalent to mayor, such as chairperson of the city council executive committee.

== Mayors ==
=== Russian empire ===
- DI Kwasniewski (Д. І. Кваснєвський), 1891–1896
- Yablonovsky (Яблоновський), 1896–1898
- OM Bukhovich (О. М. Бухович), 1898–1911
- EP Lebedievsky (Е. П. Лебедзієвський), 1911–1917
- MP Tsvetaev (М. П. Цвєтаєв), 1917
- SA Trinity (С. А. Троїцький), 1918

=== Ukrainian People's Republic ===
- Fedor Sumnevich (Федір Сумневич), 1917–1918

=== Second Polish Republic ===
- E. Dzikovsky (Є. Дзіковський), 1919
- Jan Balinski (Ян Балінський), 1919
- Sergey V. Matusevich (Сергій В. Матусевич), 1920
- Karol Balinski (Кароль Балінський), 1920–1922, 1925–1927
- Jan Lisakowski (Ян Лісаковський), 1922
- Adam Ostashevsky (Адам Осташевський), 1922–1924
- J. Romishevsky (Й. Ромішевський), 1924–1925
- Vladimir Artsemanovich (Володимир Арцеманович), 1927–1929
- Vladimir Boyarsky (Володимир Боярський), 1929–1932
- Tomasz Tsalun (Томаш Цалун), 1932–1934
- Ludwik Rzeszowski (Людвік Ржешовський), 1934-1935
- Stanislav Volk (Станіслав Волк), 1935–1939

=== Soviet Union ===
- Ivan Biletsky (Іван Білецький), 1939–1941

=== Third Reich ===
- Polycarp Potato (Полікарп Бульба), 1941–1944

=== Soviet Union ===
- Mykola Taratuta (Taratuto) (Микола Таратута (Таратуто)), 1944
- Chernyavsky (Чернявський), 1944
- Nikita Klyakhin (Микита Кляхін), 1944–1945
- Pavel Prokofiev (Павло Прокоф'єв), 1945
- Anatoliy Marchenko (Анатолій Марченко), 1945–1948
- Petro Sivolap (Петро Сиволап), 1948
- Theodosius Dod (Феодосій Додь), 1948–1949
- Tikhin Denisenko (Тихін Денисенко), 1949
- Mykola Baranchuk (Микола Баранчук), 1949–1951
- Vasil Romanenko (Василь Романенко), 1951–1958
- Gregory Shchepilkin (Григорій Щепілкін), 1958-1960
- Lavrentiy Kazmerchuk (Лаврентій Казьмерчук), 1960–1963
- Alexey Martinov (Олексій Мартинов), 1963
- Dmitry Gayovy (Дмитро Гайовий), 1963–1968
- Alexey Koristin (Олексій Користін), 1968–1981
- Victor Chaika (Віктор Чайка), 1981–1988
- Andriy Markov (Андрій Марков), 1988–1990

=== Ukraine ===
- Ivan Fedov (Іван Федів), 1990–1993
- Volodymyr Moroz (politician, born 1947) (Володимир Мороз), 1993–1998
- Viktor Chaika, 1998–2008
- Yuriy Torgun (Юрій Торгун), 2008
- Volodymyr Khomko (Володимир Хомко), 2008–2020
- Oleksandr Tretyak (Олександр Третяк), 2020–2023
- Viktor Shakyrzian (Віктор Шакирзян) (acting), 2023–

== See also ==
- Rivne history
- History of Rivne (in Ukrainian)
