= Lviv University of Trade and Economics =

University in Lviv, Ukraine

Coordinates: 49.83666°N 24.03774°E

- ДЗВО «Львівський торговельно-економічний університет»
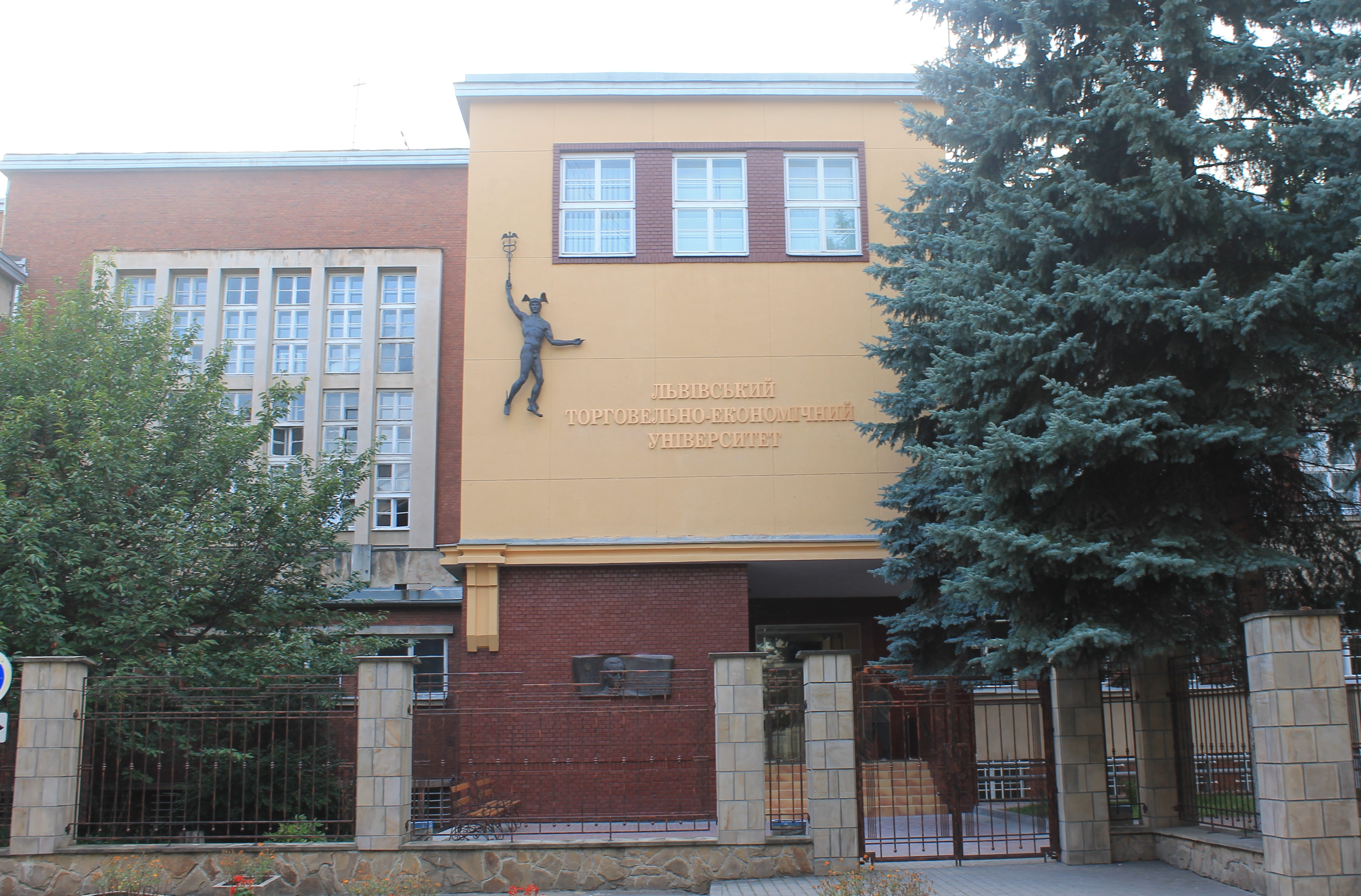
- Type: Public
- Established: 1816
- Affiliations: Ministry of Education and Science of Ukraine
- Rector: Petro O. Kutsyk
- Students: 4728
- Location: Lviv, Ukraine
- Campus: 79005 Tugan-Baranovskogo, 10
- Website: lute-world.com

The Lviv University of Trade and Economics (Ukrainian: Львівський торговельно-економічний університет) is a public university in Lviv, Ukraine.

== History ==
Lviv University of Trade and Economics - the oldest trade and economic university of Ukraine, which originates from a real school that was opened March 7, 1816. Its first director was Czech Alois Alexander Ulye.

Trohklasna real school with a sales office was transformed in 1825 into two-class school general training, which prepared students to study technical and commercial sciences.

By the Emperor's decree on March 19, 1835 the school was given the status of the Royal real-Trading Academy. Resolution of Emperor Ferdinand I of January 24, 1843 allowed to open in the real-Trading Academy Trade and Technical department, and, if necessary, and field crops. Under the new structure, the Academy consisted of biennial real school, two years of technical department and annual trade department. Academy Director was appointed Jakub Reiter - Professor Polytechnic Institute in Vienna.

In September 1844 institution called the Royal Academy of Engineering, was headed by PhD Florian Shindler, a graduate of the Polytechnic Institute in Vienna. Opening Technical Academy held November 4, 1844 Meanwhile, Lviv magistrate and Galician Diet in 1841 introduced the Austrian government's request for the establishment of a separate state trading academy. The same request was renewed in 1844, however, the initiative for various reasons, including political ("Spring of Nations"), while not supported. Shopping items in the academy read Franciszek Tun, Paul Strasser, Jerzy Kurtsbauer, Franciszek Moznik, Alexander Reyzinher, Stefan Kozhma, Franz Steyhler.

In 1851 was appointed director of the Academy of Sci. O.Reyzinhera. On October 7, 1853 Commercial department at the Technical Academy was reorganized into two-year commercial high school - then the only school in Galicia, which trained professionals commercial affairs. Department of Accounting and science of correspondence and trade to 1855 headed by Jerzy Kurtsbauer, and after his death - Stefan Kozhma. Storage and exchange law and the rules of duty and taught monopoly prof. Lviv University Jan Pazhdzyer, geography and history of the trade - Carol Pyehorskyy.

On November 11, 1871 the Technical Academy received the status of a university and moved from teaching in German to teaching in Polish. Then teach trading and exchange law was entrusted Rabanne Tsansteynovi, associate professor of Lviv University. In 1972 the first rector of the Technical Academy was chosen Ph.D., professor. Felix Strzelecki. From 1874 to 1877 Technical Academy in turn led Nepomusen Ian Frank, Carol Mashkovsky and August Freund.

July 16, 1875 Commercial department at the Technical Academy was closed. Lviv City Council and Chamber of Commerce started collecting donations for the organization of an independent educational trade school. In 1888 the fund was established creation of Lviv Trading Academy. This action was timed to the 40th anniversary of the reign of Emperor Franz Joseph. At the time it was collected over 16 thousand crowns. August 1, 1896 the Ministry of Education faiths and gave consent to establish trade schools in Lviv. September 8, 1899 Minister of religion and education ordered as Emperor of Austria-Hungary took her to the notice under which proclaimed the establishment of the High School State Trading in Lviv, which started operations on November 1, 1899 was appointed rector of the school Professor School of Commerce in Chernivtsi Anthony Pavlovsky.

In 1902, the Higher Trade School in Lviv Academy of Commerce received the status and official recognition of the basic educational center in Galicia to prepare highly qualified specialists in the field of trade. Among the teaching staff - outstanding scientists Vladimir Zalozetskyy, Eugeniusz Romer, Hilary Ohonovs'kyi, Maximilian Shoennet, Paul Postel, Paul Tsompa, Jaroslav Hordynsky Stanislav Pavlovsky. In 1917, the director of the Academy A.Palovskoho was appointed curator of the Lviv school district and inspector of trade schools. Academy Rector was elected Maximilian Shoenetta.

From April 1922 Trading Academy was reorganized in High School foreign trade, rector was again appointed Anthony Pavlovsky. In this position, in 1930 he was replaced by Alexander Dolinsky, and in 1931 Casimir Tsyselskyy. In 1932 he was elected rector VSHZT Henryk Korovicha. In 1938, the Graduate School has received the status of foreign trade academy. In 1939, the rector of the Academy of Foreign Trade in Lviv was elected Stanislaus Ruzevycha. However, World War II, which began Sept. 1 Nazi attack on Poland prevented S.Ruzevychu enter the selected position.

In the period between the world wars in the academy worked renowned scholars: Alexander Dolinsky, Alexander Dombrowski, Charls Irwin, H. Korovich, Franciszek Tomanek, August Tsirhoffer, Theophile Seyfert, Julian Chizhevsky, Eugeniusz Romer, Anthony Vereshchynsky, Kazimierz Ignatovich, Stefan Gurnyak, Stanislav Ruzyevich, Mohamed Sadiq Bey Ahabekzade. Among the students of the Academy this period one of the leaders of the national liberation movement in Western Ukraine Petro strong, Roman Ilnytskyy, who along with Yaroslav Stetsko June 30, 1941 was proclaimed in Lviv the restoration of Ukrainian statehood, Eugene Zielinski, coherent Oleg Olzhych.

November 1, 1939 at the Academy of Foreign Trade was established Lviv Institute of Soviet Trade. Prior to the German-Soviet war, it worked outstanding scientists and public figures: Vladimir Kucher, Peter Franco, Vladimir Kalinovych, Gregory Nikita, Vladimir Bilynsky and others. Director of the Institute appointed was Nicholas Yachmenova. The war claimed the lives of many teachers and students. After brutally killing Nazis renowned scientists, former rector of the Academy of Henryk Korovich and Stanislav Ruzevych.

July 27, 1944 Institute resumed its work. Director of the institute was appointed prominent Ukrainian scientist Vladimir Kucera, and November 19, 1944 - Seeds Garkavenko. The institute then enrolled 445 students. August 6, 1947 merged Lviv Institute of Soviet Trade and transferred in 1944 from Kharkiv, Ukrainian Institute of Soviet Cooperative Trade and thereupon created Lvov Trade and Economic Institute. In 1948 he enrolled here nearly two thousand students. Among the teachers - outstanding scientists, public figures: Helen Stephen-Dashkevich (the famous S.), Alexander Tysovskyy, Konstantin Hladylovych, Herynovych Vladimir, Vladimir Ohonovs'kyi, Theodore Silver, John Karpynets.

In 1953 the institute was transferred to the Tsentrospilky USSR. Semyon Sidenko was appointed its rector and led the university for over twenty years.

In the late 1940s - early 1950s were sent to the institute from various universities in Ukraine such teachers as I.Alimov, F.Massaryhin, H.Mar 'Jachin O.Chernyatyn, M.Herasymenko, M.Sokolovskyy, M.Maryshev and others. At present the Institute totaled about 2 thousand students and 125 people faculty. The Institute had 4 faculties and 19 departments. Among experienced teachers who have worked in this period - V.Ohonovskyy, M.Holyevchuk, F.Mayboroda, I.Pauk, L.Berri, F.Zastavnyy.

University worked in stifling political atmosphere, the complete absence of freedom of speech and thought. All 56 subjects were taught in Russian. Much of young professionals who have finished institute, sent to work in the eastern regions of the USSR, as well as in other republics of the Soviet Union. In September 1959, was organized by distance learning.

In the 1965–1966 school year operated 4 faculties (economic, commodity, general and Correspondence). At 16 departments worked January 21 teachers, including 69 people or 32.7% had a degree and rank.

In February 1974, the institute was headed by Casimir Pyrozhak. At this time there were enrolled 4,684 students and employed 353 teachers and scientists. 4 faculties, 19 departments led by experienced teachers and researchers. The institute has trained highly qualified specialists from five majors: economics of trade, accounting, organization of mechanized processing of economic information, merchandising and organization for industrial products, merchandising and organizing food trade. In September 1977 the Institute Students from Poland, Hungary, Czechoslovakia, Bulgaria, GDR, Vietnam and later from many countries in Asia, Africa and Latin America. On November 12, 1980 at the Institute worked 271 teachers, of whom 9 doctors, 120 PhDs.

Since February 1993. Already in Ukraine's independence, the university rector was appointed Jacob Goncharuk. In December 1994, the oldest economic university Ukraine regained the status of the academy. President of the Academy was elected chairman of the Board Ukoopspilka Stanislav Babenko.

January 9, 2007 Conference of the Academy for the first time in postwar history through democratic elections of three candidates elected a new rector. They became the first rector professor John Kopych. September 30 was the inauguration of the newly elected rector, attended by government officials, Ukoopspilka, rectors of many schools, former students of the academy - known socio-political and cooperative leaders, scientists, and businessmen.

John Kopych oath on the Holy Scriptures manuscript appears at the end of the 16th century. Custom Brotherhood. Today the Academy - a basic university IV level of accreditation. Graduates of the Academy are working in enterprises and organizations of consumer cooperatives, public and private sectors. Operates graduate and specialized advice on protection dissertations. At the Academy: Ukrainian Institute of computer information processing systems in consumer cooperatives "Ukoopinformproekt" Research and Production Company "Lvivakademaudyt" Research laboratory of economic evaluation, Business Center "Interekonomika" Business English, French Business Center language publishing. Created educational complex "Academy", which consisted of cooperative schools, colleges, schools, and over 40 secondary schools in Lviv. The teaching staff of the Academy collaborates with educational institutions in Russia, USA, England, Canada, Austria, Hungary, France, Germany and Poland.

190-year anniversary (2007) many thousands of the Academy met in the prime of his life and opportunities confidently looks to the future

== Campuses and buildings ==
Cases

- Case number 1 - the main building, there is the entrance of the Rector, Institute of Economics and Finance and Education and Scientific Information Institute. Address hull number 1 - st. Tugan-Baranovsky, 10
- Case number 2 - here is the Faculty of Management. Address building No. 2 - st. U.Samchuka, 6.
- Case number 3 - here is Tovarovednaya-Commercial School and Faculty of Distance Education. Address building No. 3 - st. U.Samchuka, 9.
- Case number 4 - here is the Department of International Economic Relations and the Institute of Continuing Education. Address hull number 4 - st. Brothers Tershakivtsiv 2a.
- Case number 5 - here is the Faculty of Law. Address hull number 5 - st. Ivan Franko, 68

Dormitories

- Hostel number 1 - hostel Institute of Postgraduate Education. Address - Ave Red Kaliny, 7

Hostel number 2. Address - st. Ternopilska, 8

- Hostel number 3. Address - Ave Red Kaliny, 7.
- Hostel number 4. Address - Ave Red Kaliny, 7a.

Libraries

- Subscription
- Information and bibliography
- Division of Acquisition and processing of literature
- Reading Room No. 1
- Reading Room No. 2
- Hall of periodicals

== Institutes and faculties ==
In the academy functioning - 3 institutes and 5 faculties. Namely:

- Institute of Economics and Finance;
- Institute of Continuing Education;
- Educational and Scientific Information Institute;
- Commodity research and commercial department;
- Faculty of Management;
- Department of International Economic Relations;
- Faculty of Law;
- School of Distance Education.

=== Institute of Economics and Finance ===
is one of the major structural units of Lviv University of Trade and Economics, who is highly skilled in the areas of:

- Accounting and auditing;
- Finance and credit;
- Business Economics.

Specializations Institute accredited to the highest - IV accreditation level. Each year the institute in all directions and produces about 400 graduates to work in various industries. After preparation of university graduates can be trained in graduate school. The institute operates Specialized Scientific Council of the defense of theses in "Economics and business management." The Institute includes research laboratory of economic evaluation and seven departments. At the Department of the Institute are known doctor of economic sciences and professors, experienced docents and candidates of economic sciences. Five Departments is issuing that exercise training in specified areas of training. Postgraduate Institute was created in 1969 as a branch LKA is one of the leading academic departments in Western Ukraine. The Institute conducted training of specialists (obtain a second higher education), Masters and on training courses. Here are functioning business center "Interekonomika" and "Human Resources".

Retraining is carried out on the basis of Licenses of the Ministry of Education of Ukraine, namely the following specialties

- Accounting and Auditing
- Finance
- Law

These specialty certified by the Ministry of Education, Youth and Sports of Ukraine the fourth highest level of accreditation. Educational and Scientific Information Institute established September 6, 2010 at the former Department of Computer Technology Lviv Commercial Academy.

Institute united all computer labs and specialized departments Lviv Commercial Academy. Tovarovednaya - Commercial Department was created over 70 years ago. One of the first Deans of the Faculty (1940-41 biennium) was Petro Franko - known to scientists and public figure - the son of Ivan Franko. Preparation of the faculty is conducted by qualified personnel. Currently, the faculty prepares specialists in:

- Accounting and Commercial Enterprise
- Hotel and restaurant business
- Food Technology and Engineering

Material and technical base of faculty has 24 classrooms and 38 specialized laboratories. Since 1997, the department operates accredited test center products, which is the material base for scientific research and commodity training base for the preparation of commodity experts. Since 2009, the faculty is 2 new laboratories - Laboratory-equipped lab and confectionery that are educational base for training in hotel and restaurant business.

=== Faculty of Management ===
was established by Academy in 1992. Currently, the faculty prepares specialists in:

- Economic Cybernetics
- Management of Organizations

The preparation of both specialties at the academy engaged highly qualified teachers - specialists in their field with the highest academic degrees and titles.

=== Faculty of International Economic Relations ===
was established in 1993 and trains students in two specialities:

- International Economic Relations;
- Marketing.

The faculty consists of four departments. Staff Department constantly improves their skills through training in leading educational institutions (including USA, UK, Austria, Hungary, Poland, and Russia), participation in international scientific conferences.

=== Department of International Relations Academy ===
maintains close contacts with international student organizations (AIESEC - "International Organization of Students-economists", AEGEE - "Forum of European students") and leading universities in Europe, America and the CIS countries and encourage the participation of students studying in international seminars, conferences and programs. Best students - graduates continue their education in graduate school at the Department of International Economic Relations and Marketing and have an opportunity to defend his thesis in a specialized scientific council of Lviv Commercial Academy.

Faculty prepares students for their field of study - law. Classes with students faculty conduct more than seventy teachers, most of whom have advanced degrees and titles, including doctors, professors. At the Faculty operates NGO - "Students League - lawyers." This is a non-profit organization established for mutual assistance and mutual support in the realization of the rights and interests of citizens of Ukraine, comprehensive assistance in promoting legal reform and development of the legal system of Ukraine legal education. For over twelve years UEFA performs such activities as providing free legal assistance to low-income citizens - Clinic "Pro bono" and providing legal assistance to entrepreneurs of small and medium-sized businesses in the first clinic in Ukraine - "Pro bono business".

=== Faculty of Distance Education ===
is among the oldest in Lviv Commercial Academy having existed since 1962. This department trains bachelors all directions correspondence LKA.

== Honoris Causa ==
- Stanislav Babenko (2007)
- Andriychuk Victor (2007)
- Anatoly Romanov (2007)
- Basil Sopko (2008)
- Oleg Kuzmin (2009)
- Shkaraban Stepan (2010)
- Janusz Julian Maersk (2011)
- Karol Karski (2023)

== Awards and reputation ==
Rating of universities in Ukraine, III, IV accreditation levels Top-200 Ukraine in 2012 – 66

Rating of universities in Ukraine "Compass 2012" - Western Region – 5

Rating of higher educational establishments of Ukraine in terms scientometric database Scopus As of 06/04/2012 – 90

== See also ==
List of universities in Ukraine
