= Novyi Yarychiv settlement hromada =

Hromada in Lviv Oblast, Ukraine

Novyi Yarychiv settlement hromada Новояричівська селищна громада
- Hromada
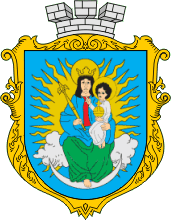
- Seal
- Interactive map of Novyi Yarychiv settlement hromada
- Country: Ukraine
- Oblast: Lviv Oblast
- Raion: Lviv Raion
- Administrative center: Novyi Yarychiv

Area
  - Total: 2,221 km^{2} (858 sq mi)

Population
  - Total: 18,556
  - Density: 8.355/km^{2} (21.64/sq mi)
- CATOTTG code: UA46060290000052876
- Settlements: 18
- Rural settlements: 2
- Villages: 16
- Website: novoyarychiv-gromada.gov.ua

Novyi Yarychiv settlement hromada (Ukrainian: Новояричівська селищна громада) is a hromada in Ukraine, in Lviv Raion of Lviv Oblast. The administrative center is the rural settlement of Novyi Yarychiv.

== Settlements ==
The hromada consists of 2 rural settlement (Zapytiv and Novyi Yarychiv) and 16 villages:

- Baniunyn
- Borshchovychi
- Velyki Pidlisky
- Velykosilky
- Didyliv
- Kukeziv
- Mali Nahirtsi
- Neslukhiv
- Nova Lodyna
- Pykulovychi
- Rudantsi
- Sokoliv
- Staryi Yarychiv
- Ubyni
- Khreniv
- Tseperiv
