= Kamianka-Buzka Raion =

Former subdivision of Lviv Oblast, Ukraine

Kamianka-Buzka Raion Кам'янка-Бузький район
- Raion
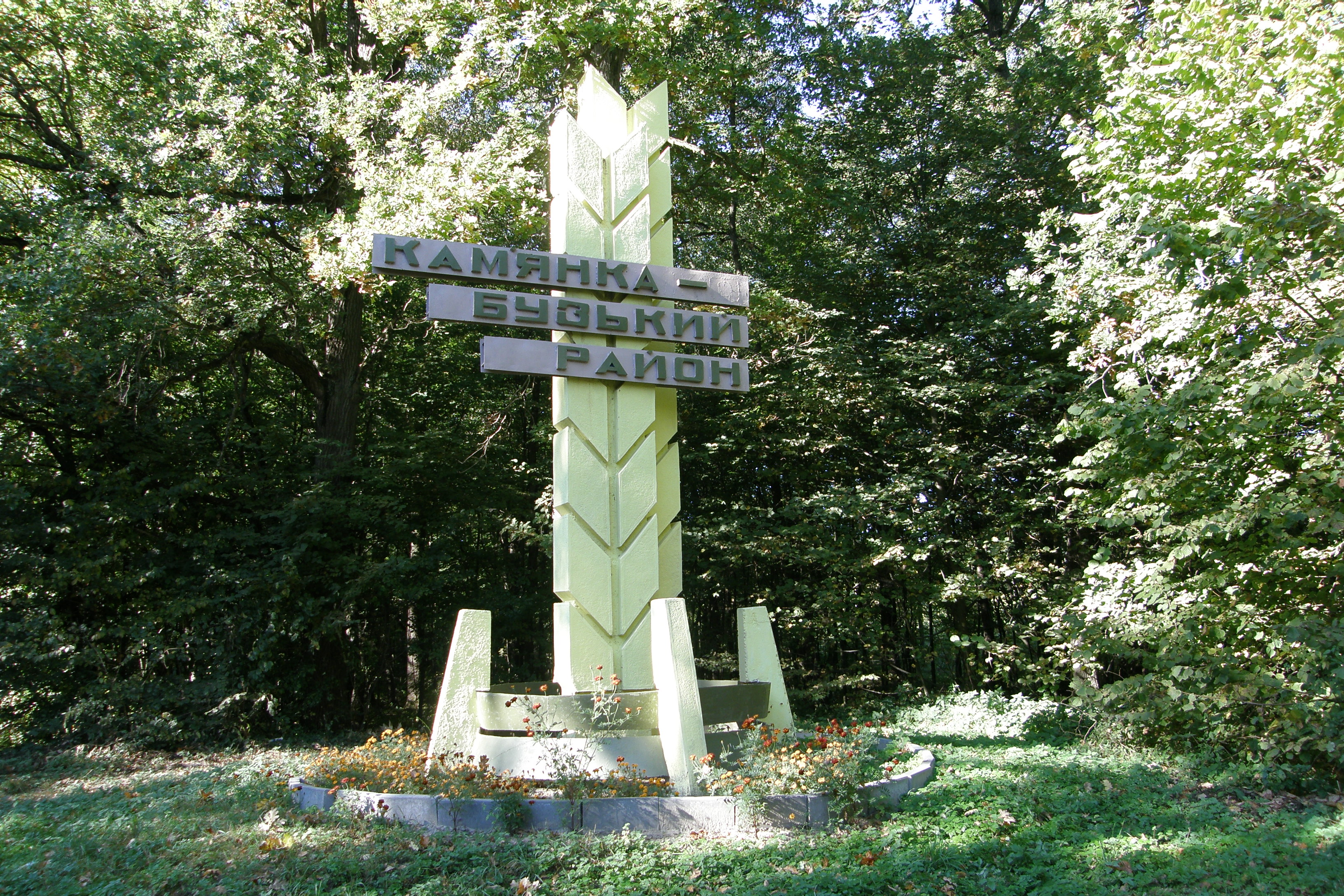

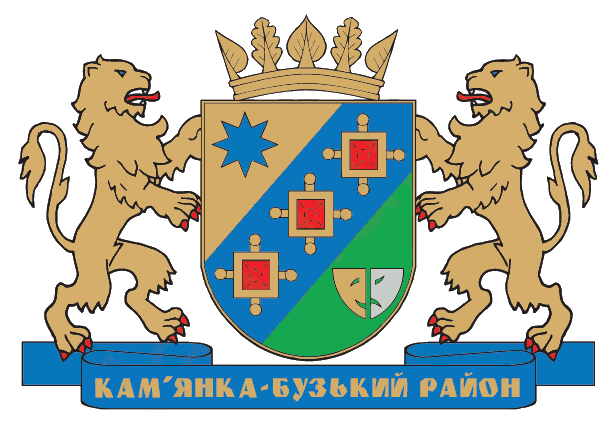
- Flag Coat of arms

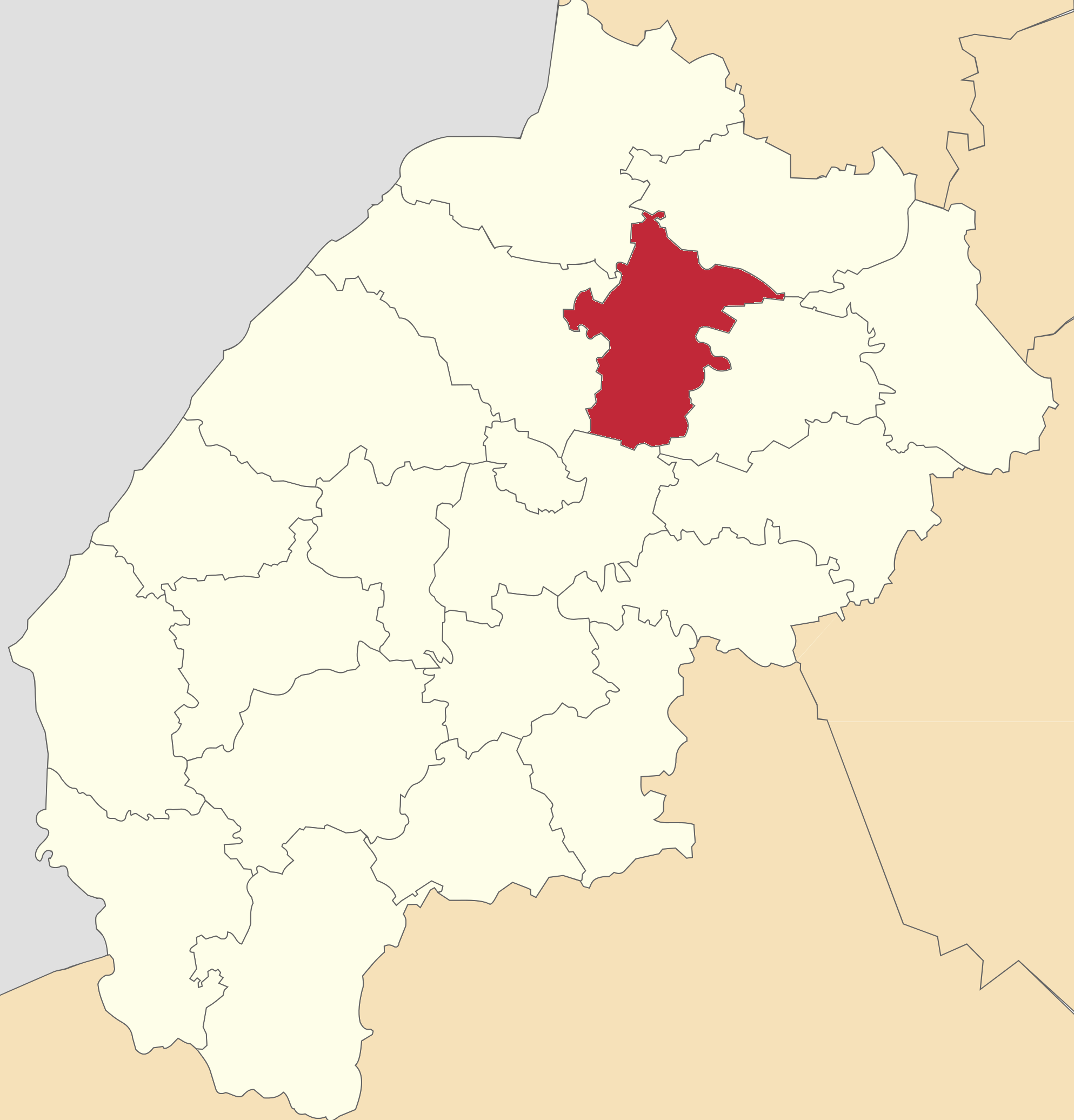
- Coordinates: 50°4′30″N 24°21′19″E
- Country: Ukraine
- Region: Lviv Oblast
- Established: 1940
- Disestablished: 18 July 2020
- Admin. center: Kamianka-Buzka
- Subdivisions: List: — city councils; — settlement councils; — rural councils; Number of localities: — cities; — urban-type settlements; 75 — villages; — rural settlements

Area
  - Total: 867 km^{2} (335 sq mi)

Population (2020)
  - Total: 57,389
  - Density: 66.2/km^{2} (171/sq mi)
- Time zone: UTC+02:00 (EET)
  - Summer (DST): UTC+03:00 (EEST)
- Postal index: 80400—80466
- Area code: 380-3254

Kamianka-Buzka Raion (Ukrainian: Кам'янка-Бузький район) was a raion in Lviv Oblast in western Ukraine. Its administrative center was Kamianka-Buzka. The raion was abolished on 18 July 2020 as part of the administrative reform of Ukraine, which reduced the number of raions of Lviv Oblast to seven. The area of Kamianka-Buzka Raion was split between Lviv and Chervonohrad raions. The last estimate of the raion population was 57,389 (2020 est.).

It was established in 1940.

At the time of disestablishment, the raion consisted of four hromadas:

- Dobrotvir settlement hromada with the administration in the urban-type settlement of Dobrotvir, transferred to Chervonohrad Raion;
- Kamianka-Buzka urban hromada with the administration in Kamianka-Buzka, transferred to Lviv Raion;
- Novyi Yarychiv settlement hromada with the administration in the urban-type settlement of Novyi Yarychiv, transferred to Lviv Raion;
- Zhovtantsi rural hromada with the administration in the selo of Zhovtantsi, transferred to Lviv Raion.

== See also ==
- Administrative divisions of Lviv Oblast
