= Spassky (rural locality) =

Spassky (Russian: Спасский; masculine), Spasskaya (Спасская; feminine), or Spasskoye (Спасское; neuter) is the name of several rural localities in Russia.

== Republic of Bashkortostan ==
As of 2010, two rural localities in the Republic of Bashkortostan bear this name:

- Spasskoye, Iglinsky District, Republic of Bashkortostan, a village in Tavtimanovsky Selsoviet of Iglinsky District
- Spasskoye, Sterlitamaksky District, Republic of Bashkortostan, a village in Podlesnensky Selsoviet of Sterlitamaksky District

== Bryansk Oblast ==
As of 2010, one rural locality in Bryansk Oblast bears this name:

- Spassky, Bryansk Oblast, a settlement in Baklansky Selsoviet of Pochepsky District

== Chelyabinsk Oblast ==
As of 2010, one rural locality in Chelyabinsk Oblast bears this name:

- Spassky, Chelyabinsk Oblast, a settlement in Spassky Selsoviet of Verkhneuralsky District

== Ivanovo Oblast ==
As of 2010, three rural localities in Ivanovo Oblast bear this name:

- Spasskoye, Komsomolsky District, Ivanovo Oblast, a village in Komsomolsky District
- Spasskoye, Privolzhsky District, Ivanovo Oblast, a village in Privolzhsky District
- Spasskoye, Yuzhsky District, Ivanovo Oblast, a village in Yuzhsky District

== Kaluga Oblast ==
As of 2010, one rural locality in Kaluga Oblast bears this name:

- Spasskoye, Kaluga Oblast, a village in Baryatinsky District

== Kirov Oblast ==
As of 2010, five rural localities in Kirov Oblast bear this name:

- Spasskoye, Bogorodsky District, Kirov Oblast, a selo in Spassky Rural Okrug of Bogorodsky District
- Spasskoye, Kotelnichsky District, Kirov Oblast, a selo in Spassky Rural Okrug of Kotelnichsky District
- Spasskoye, Slobodskoy District, Kirov Oblast, a village in Zakarinsky Rural Okrug of Slobodskoy District
- Spasskaya, Kumyonsky District, Kirov Oblast, a village under the administrative jurisdiction of the urban-type settlement of Kumyony, Kumyonsky District
- Spasskaya, Sunsky District, Kirov Oblast, a village in Bolshevistsky Rural Okrug of Sunsky District

== Kostroma Oblast ==
As of 2010, one rural locality in Kostroma Oblast bears this name:

- Spasskoye, Kostroma Oblast, a village in Sudislavskoye Settlement of Sudislavsky District

== Kurgan Oblast ==
As of 2010, one rural locality in Kurgan Oblast bears this name:

- Spasskoye, Kurgan Oblast, a village in Samokhvalovsky Selsoviet of Shatrovsky District

== Kursk Oblast ==
As of 2010, two rural localities in Kursk Oblast bear this name:

- Spasskoye, Kursk Oblast, a village in Spassky Selsoviet of Medvensky District
- Spasskaya, Kursk Oblast, a village in Volokonsky Selsoviet of Bolshesoldatsky District

== Lipetsk Oblast ==
As of 2010, three rural localities in Lipetsk Oblast bear this name:

- Spasskoye, Stanovlyansky District, Lipetsk Oblast, a selo in Lamskoy Selsoviet of Stanovlyansky District
- Spasskoye, Volovsky District, Lipetsk Oblast, a selo in Spassky Selsoviet of Volovsky District
- Spasskaya, Lipetsk Oblast, a village in Tulsky Selsoviet of Terbunsky District

== Mari El Republic ==
As of 2010, one rural locality in the Mari El Republic bears this name:

- Spassky, Mari El Republic, a village in Mikhaylovsky Rural Okrug of Sovetsky District

== Republic of Mordovia ==
As of 2010, two rural localities in the Republic of Mordovia bear this name:

- Spasskoye, Bolsheignatovsky District, Republic of Mordovia, a selo in Spassky Selsoviet of Bolsheignatovsky District
- Spasskoye, Ruzayevsky District, Republic of Mordovia, a selo in Russko-Baymakovsky Selsoviet of Ruzayevsky District

== Moscow Oblast ==
As of 2010, four rural localities in Moscow Oblast bear this name:

- Spasskoye, Klinsky District, Moscow Oblast, a village in Petrovskoye Rural Settlement of Klinsky District
- Spasskoye, Leninsky District, Moscow Oblast, a village under the administrative jurisdiction of the town of Vidnoye, Leninsky District
- Spasskoye, Odintsovsky District, Moscow Oblast, a village in Yershovskoye Rural Settlement of Odintsovsky District
- Spasskoye, Stupinsky District, Moscow Oblast, a selo in Leontyevskoye Rural Settlement of Stupinsky District

== Nizhny Novgorod Oblast ==
As of 2010, four rural localities in Nizhny Novgorod Oblast bear this name:

- Spasskoye, Bor, Nizhny Novgorod Oblast, a selo in Lindovsky Selsoviet of under the administrative jurisdiction of the town of Bor
- Spasskoye, Shatkovsky District, Nizhny Novgorod Oblast, a selo in Kerzhemoksky Selsoviet of Shatkovsky District
- Spasskoye, Spassky District, Nizhny Novgorod Oblast, a selo in Spassky Selsoviet of Spassky District
- Spasskoye, Vetluzhsky District, Nizhny Novgorod Oblast, a selo in Makaryevsky Selsoviet of Vetluzhsky District

== Novgorod Oblast ==
As of 2010, one rural locality in Novgorod Oblast bears this name:

- Spasskoye, Novgorod Oblast, a village in Progresskoye Settlement of Borovichsky District

== Omsk Oblast ==
As of 2010, one rural locality in Omsk Oblast bears this name:

- Spasskoye, Omsk Oblast, a selo in Krasnopolyansky Rural Okrug of Gorkovsky District

== Orenburg Oblast ==
As of 2010, two rural localities in Orenburg Oblast bear this name:

- Spasskoye, Saraktashsky District, Orenburg Oblast, a selo in Spassky Selsoviet of Saraktashsky District
- Spasskoye, Sorochinsky District, Orenburg Oblast, a selo in Voykovsky Selsoviet of Sorochinsky District

== Oryol Oblast ==
As of 2010, six rural localities in Oryol Oblast bear this name:

- Spassky, Oryol Oblast, a settlement in Berezovsky Selsoviet of Dmitrovsky District
- Spasskoye, Korsakovsky District, Oryol Oblast, a selo in Nechayevsky Selsoviet of Korsakovsky District
- Spasskoye, Mtsensky District, Oryol Oblast, a selo in Protasovsky Selsoviet of Mtsensky District
- Spasskoye, Saburovsky Selsoviet, Orlovsky District, Oryol Oblast, a selo in Saburovsky Selsoviet of Orlovsky District
- Spasskoye, Spassky Selsoviet, Orlovsky District, Oryol Oblast, a selo in Spassky Selsoviet of Orlovsky District
- Spasskoye, Sverdlovsky District, Oryol Oblast, a village in Bogodukhovsky Selsoviet of Sverdlovsky District

== Primorsky Krai ==
As of 2010, one rural locality in Primorsky Krai bears this name:

- Spasskoye, Primorsky Krai, a selo in Spassky District

== Pskov Oblast ==
As of 2010, one rural locality in Pskov Oblast bears this name:

- Spasskoye, Pskov Oblast, a village in Pskovsky District

== Ryazan Oblast ==
As of 2010, one rural locality in Ryazan Oblast bears this name:

- Spasskoye, Ryazan Oblast, a selo in Spassky Rural Okrug of Miloslavsky District

== Samara Oblast ==
As of 2010, two rural localities in Samara Oblast bear this name:

- Spasskoye, Privolzhsky District, Samara Oblast, a selo in Privolzhsky District
- Spasskoye, Sergiyevsky District, Samara Oblast, a selo in Sergiyevsky District

== Saratov Oblast ==
As of 2010, one rural locality in Saratov Oblast bears this name:

- Spasskoye, Saratov Oblast, a selo in Volsky District

== Smolensk Oblast ==
As of 2010, one rural locality in Smolensk Oblast bears this name:

- Spasskoye, Smolensk Oblast, a village in Medvedevskoye Rural Settlement of Tyomkinsky District

== Stavropol Krai ==
As of 2010, one rural locality in Stavropol Krai bears this name:

- Spasskoye, Stavropol Krai, a selo in Blagodarnensky District

== Tambov Oblast ==
As of 2010, one rural locality in Tambov Oblast bears this name:

- Spasskoye, Tambov Oblast, a selo in Spassky Selsoviet of Staroyuryevsky District

== Republic of Tatarstan ==
As of 2010, one rural locality in the Republic of Tatarstan bears this name:

- Spasskoye, Republic of Tatarstan, a selo in Bugulminsky District

== Tver Oblast ==
As of 2010, three rural localities in Tver Oblast bear this name:

- Spasskoye, Kalyazinsky District, Tver Oblast, a selo in Kalyazinsky District
- Spasskoye, Kashinsky District, Tver Oblast, a selo in Kashinsky District
- Spasskoye, Staritsky District, Tver Oblast, a village in Staritsky District

== Vladimir Oblast ==
As of 2010, four rural localities in Vladimir Oblast bear this name:

- Spasskoye, Vladimir, Vladimir Oblast, a selo under the administrative jurisdiction of the city of Vladimir
- Spasskoye (selo), Sobinsky District, Vladimir Oblast, a selo in Sobinsky District
- Spasskoye (village), Sobinsky District, Vladimir Oblast, a village in Sobinsky District
- Spasskoye, Yuryev-Polsky District, Vladimir Oblast, a selo in Yuryev-Polsky District

== Vologda Oblast ==
As of 2010, nine rural localities in Vologda Oblast bear this name:

- Spasskoye, Gryazovetsky District, Vologda Oblast, a village in Lezhsky Selsoviet of Gryazovetsky District
- Spasskoye, Kharovsky District, Vologda Oblast, a selo in Kharovsky Selsoviet of Kharovsky District
- Spasskoye, Biryakovsky Selsoviet, Sokolsky District, Vologda Oblast, a village in Biryakovsky Selsoviet of Sokolsky District
- Spasskoye, Prigorodny Selsoviet, Sokolsky District, Vologda Oblast, a village in Prigorodny Selsoviet of Sokolsky District
- Spasskoye, Syamzhensky District, Vologda Oblast, a village in Filinsky Selsoviet of Syamzhensky District
- Spasskoye, Ust-Kubinsky District, Vologda Oblast, a village in Mitensky Selsoviet of Ust-Kubinsky District
- Spasskoye, Ustyuzhensky District, Vologda Oblast, a settlement in Podolsky Selsoviet of Ustyuzhensky District
- Spasskoye, Vologodsky District, Vologda Oblast, a selo in Spassky Selsoviet of Vologodsky District
- Spasskaya, Vologda Oblast, a village in Ilyinsky Selsoviet of Kharovsky District

== Voronezh Oblast ==
As of 2010, two rural localities in Voronezh Oblast bear this name:

- Spasskoye, Semiluksky District, Voronezh Oblast, a village in Zemlyanskoye Rural Settlement of Semiluksky District
- Spasskoye, Verkhnekhavsky District, Voronezh Oblast, a selo in Spasskoye Rural Settlement of Verkhnekhavsky District

== Yaroslavl Oblast ==
As of 2010, four rural localities in Yaroslavl Oblast bear this name:

- Spasskoye, Nekouzsky District, Yaroslavl Oblast, a village in Rodionovsky Rural Okrug of Nekouzsky District
- Spasskoye, Klementyevsky Rural Okrug, Uglichsky District, Yaroslavl Oblast, a village in Klementyevsky Rural Okrug of Uglichsky District
- Spasskoye, Otradnovsky Rural Okrug, Uglichsky District, Yaroslavl Oblast, a selo in Otradnovsky Rural Okrug of Uglichsky District
- Spasskoye, Yaroslavsky District, Yaroslavl Oblast, a selo in Bekrenevsky Rural Okrug of Yaroslavsky District

== See also ==
- Spassk, several inhabited localities in Russia
- Novospassky (inhabited locality), several inhabited localities in Russia
