= Spasskoye =

Spasskoye (Russian: Спасское), rural localities in Russia, may refer to:

Arkhangelsk Oblast

- Spasskoye, Arkhangelsk Oblast, a selo

Bashkortostan

- Spasskoye, Iglinsky District, Republic of Bashkortostan, a village
- Spasskoye, Sterlitamaksky District, Republic of Bashkortostan, a village

Ivanovo Oblast

- Spasskoye, Komsomolsky District, Ivanovo Oblast, a village
- Spasskoye, Privolzhsky District, Ivanovo Oblast, a selo
- Spasskoye, Yuzhsky District, Ivanovo Oblast, a village

Kaluga Oblast

- Spasskoye, Kaluga Oblast, a village

Kirov Oblast

- Spasskoye, Bogorodsky District, Kirov Oblast, a selo
- Spasskoye, Kotelnichsky District, Kirov Oblast, a selo
- Spasskoye, Slobodskoy District, Kirov Oblast, a village

Kostroma Oblast

- Spasskoye, Kostroma Oblast, a village

Kurgan Oblast

- Spasskoye, Kurgan Oblast, a village

Kursk Oblast

- Spasskoye, Kursk Oblast, a village

Lipetsk Oblast

- Spasskoye, Stanovlyansky District, Lipetsk Oblast, a selo
- Spasskoye, Volovsky District, Lipetsk Oblast, a selo

Republic of Mordovia

- Spasskoye, Bolsheignatovsky District, Republic of Mordovia, a selo
- Spasskoye, Ruzayevsky District, Republic of Mordovia, a selo

Moscow Oblast

- Spasskoye, Klinsky District, Moscow Oblast, a village
- Spasskoye, Leninsky District, Moscow Oblast, a village
- Spasskoye, Odintsovsky District, Moscow Oblast, a village
- Spasskoye, Stupinsky District, Moscow Oblast, a selo

Nizhny Novgorod Oblast

- Spasskoye, Borsky District, Nizhny Novgorod Oblast, a selo
- Spasskoye, Shatkovsky District, Nizhny Novgorod Oblast, a selo
- Spasskoye, Spassky District, Nizhny Novgorod Oblast, a selo
- Spasskoye, Vetluzhsky District, Nizhny Novgorod Oblast, a selo

Novgorod Oblast

- Spasskoye, Novgorod Oblast, a village
- Spasskoye, Omsk Oblast, a selo

Orenburg Oblast

- Spasskoye, Saraktashsky District, Orenburg Oblast, a selo
- Spasskoye, Sorochinsky District, Orenburg Oblast, a selo

Oryol Oblast

- Spasskoye, Korsakovsky District, Oryol Oblast, a selo
- Spasskoye, Mtsensky District, Oryol Oblast, a selo
- Spasskoye, Saburovsky Selsoviet, Orlovsky District, Oryol Oblast, a selo
- Spasskoye, Spasskoy Rural Settlement, Orlovsky District, Oryol Oblast, a selo
- Spasskoye, Sverdlovsky District, Oryol Oblast, a village

Primorsky Krai

- Spasskoye, Primorsky Krai, a selo

Pskov Oblast

- Spasskoye, Pskov Oblast, a village

Ryazan Oblast

- Spasskoye, Ryazan Oblast, a selo

Samara Oblast

- Spasskoye, Privolzhsky District, Samara Oblast, a selo
- Spasskoye, Sergiyevsky District, Samara Oblast, a selo

Saratov Oblast

- Spasskoye, Saratov Oblast, a selo

Smolensk Oblast

- Spasskoye, Smolensk Oblast, a village

Stavropol Krai

- Spasskoye, Stavropol Krai, a selo

Tambov Oblast

- Spasskoye, Tambov Oblast, a selo

Tatarstan

- Spasskoye, Tatarstan, a selo

Tula Oblast

- Spasskoye, Bogoroditsky District, Tula Oblast, a village
- Spasskoye, Kurkinsky District, Tula Oblast, a village
- Spasskoye, Novomoskovsky District, Tula Oblast, a selo
- Spasskoye, Odoyevsky District, Tula Oblast, a selo
- Spasskoye, Plavsky District, Tula Oblast, a selo
- Spasskoye, Tyoplo-Ogaryovsky District, Tula Oblast, a selo
- Spasskoye, Lipitsky Rural Settlement, Chernsky District, Tula Oblast, a village
- Spasskoye, Turgenevsky Rural Settlement, Chernsky District, Tula Oblast, a selo
- Spasskoye, Lazarevsky Rural Settlement, Shchyokinsky District, Tula Oblast, a selo
- Spasskoye, Yasnopolyansky Rural Settlement, Shchyokinsky District, Tula Oblast, a selo

Tver Oblast

- Spasskoye, Kalyazinsky District, Tver Oblast, a selo
- Spasskoye, Kashinsky District, Tver Oblast, a village
- Spasskoye, Staritsky District, Tver Oblast, a village

Vladimir Oblast

- Spasskoye (Bereznikovskoye Rural Settlement), Sobinsky District, Vladimir Oblast, a village
- Spasskoye (Rozhdestvenskoye Rural Settlement), Sobinsky District, Vladimir Oblast, a selo
- Spasskoye, Vladimir Urban District, Vladimir Oblast, a selo
- Spasskoye, Yuryev-Polsky District, Vladimir Oblast, a selo

Vologda Oblast

- Spasskoye, Gryazovetsky District, Vologda Oblast, a village
- Spasskoye, Biryakovsky Rural Settlement, Sokolsky District, Vologda Oblast, a village
- Spasskoye, Prigorodny Rural Settlement, Sokolsky District, Vologda Oblast, a village
- Spasskoye, Kharovsky District, Vologda Oblast, a selo
- Spasskoye, Syamzhensky District, Vologda Oblast, a village
- Spasskoye, Ust-Kubinsky District, Vologda Oblast, a village
- Spasskoye, Ustyuzhensky District, Vologda Oblast, a village
- Spasskoye, Semiluksky District, Voronezh Oblast, a village
- Spasskoye, Verkhnekhavsky District, Voronezh Oblast, a selo
- Spasskoye, Vologodsky District, Vologda Oblast, a selo

Yaroslavl Oblast

- Spasskoye, Nekouzsky District, Yaroslavl Oblast, a village
- Spasskoye, Otradnovsky Rural Settlement, Uglichsky District, Yaroslavl Oblast, a selo
- Spasskoye, Slobodsky Rural Settlement, Uglichsky District, Yaroslavl Oblast, a village
- Spasskoye, Yaroslavsky District, Yaroslavl Oblast, a selo
