= Novospassky =

Novospassky (masculine), Novospasskaya (feminine), or Novospasskoye (neuter) may refer to:

- Novospassky Bridge, a bridge over the Moskva River in Moscow, Russia
- Novospassky District, a district of Ulyanovsk Oblast, Russia
- Novospassky Monastery, a fortified monastery in Moscow, Russia
- Novospassky (inhabited locality) (Novospasskaya, Novospasskoye), several inhabited localities in Russia

== See also ==
- Spassky (disambiguation)
