= Spas =

Spas or SPAS may refer to:

- Spa, a therapeutic water treatment

== Geography ==
- Spas, Russia, several rural localities in Russia
- Spas, Kalush Raion, Ivano-Frankivsk Oblast, a village in Kalush Raion in Ivano-Frankivsk Oblast, Ukraine
- Spas, Sambir Raion, Lviv Oblast, a village in Sambir Raion in Lviv Oblast, Ukraine
- Spas, Lviv Raion, Lviv Oblast, a village in Lviv Raion in Lviv Oblast, Ukraine
- Spas, Kukës, a village in the municipality of Kukës, Albania
- Spas, Debar, a village in the municipality of Debar, North Macedonia

== Organizations ==
- Spas (TV channel), a Russian Orthodox TV channel
- The Savior (paramilitary organization) (Spas)
- Serbian Patriotic Alliance (SPAS)

== Other ==
- Spas (soup), popular in Armenia
- Alférez FAP Alfredo Vladimir Sara Bauer Airport (ICAO: SPAS), in Peru
- Shuttle pallet satellite (SPaS)
- Spas T. Raikin, anti-communist activist and historian

== See also ==
- Franchi SPAS-12, a make of shotgun
- Franchi SPAS-15, a make of shotgun
- Spa (disambiguation)
