= Spassky District =

Federal subjects of Russia which have an entity called Spassky District

Spassky District is the name of several administrative and municipal districts in Russia. The name is generally derived from or related to the root spas ('savior')—usually alluding to the Christian faith.

- Spassky District, Nizhny Novgorod Oblast, an administrative and municipal district of Nizhny Novgorod Oblast
- Spassky District, Penza Oblast, an administrative and municipal district of Penza Oblast
- Spassky District, Primorsky Krai, an administrative and municipal district of Primorsky Krai
- Spassky District, Ryazan Oblast, an administrative and municipal district of Ryazan Oblast
- Spassky District, Republic of Tatarstan, an administrative and municipal district of the Republic of Tatarstan

== See also ==
- Spassky (disambiguation)
- Spassk, name of several inhabited localities in Russia
- Spas (disambiguation)
