= Bestuzhevo =

Bestuzhevo (Russian: Бестужево) is the name of several rural localities in Russia:

- Bestuzhevo, Altai Krai, a selo in Ilyinsky Selsoviet of Shipunovsky District of Altai Krai
- Bestuzhevo, Arkhangelsk Oblast, a selo in Bestuzhevsky Selsoviet of Ustyansky District of Arkhangelsk Oblast
- Bestuzhevo, Moscow Oblast, a village in Bolsherogachevskoye Rural Settlement of Dmitrovsky District of Moscow Oblast
- Bestuzhevo, Nizhny Novgorod Oblast, a selo in Shatovsky Selsoviet of Arzamassky District of Nizhny Novgorod Oblast
- Bestuzhevo, Ryazan Oblast, a selo in Yurakovsky Rural Okrug of Korablinsky District of Ryazan Oblast
- Bestuzhevo, Tula Oblast, a village in Butyrskaya Rural Administration of Uzlovsky District of Tula Oblast
- Bestuzhevo, Ulyanovsk Oblast, a settlement in Krasnoselsky Rural Okrug of Novospassky District of Ulyanovsk Oblast
- Bestuzhevo, Vologda Oblast, a village in Gulinsky Selsoviet of Belozersky District of Vologda Oblast
