= Sampson Sievers =

Sampson Sievers, (born Edward Sievers, Russian: Эдуард Сиверс) July 10, 1900 – August 24, 1979 was a Russian Orthodox Christian elder, hieromonk, priest, confessor of Russian patriarch and higher clergy, and mystic of English ancestry, who was imprisoned and sent to Soviet forced labor camps.

== Early years and family ==
Edward Sievers was born July 10, (June 27 by Old Style), 1900 in Saint Petersburg. His mother was Mabel Annie Sievers (born Gare), an educated English woman. His father, Jasper Sievers, is of Holsatian origin and was the head of the military headquarters of general Ruzskiy who commanded the Northern District at Riga. He was also a personal friend and adviser of the last Russian Tsar Nicholas II.

On July 23, 1900, Edward was baptised at the Anglican church of Saint Petersburg by local Anglican priest William A. Macloid. The baptism protocol from the Anglican church says that the family resided at Malaya Italyanskaya (Little Italian) street in Saint Petersburg.

Sievers finished Saint Petersburg Reform (Protestant) Gymnasium (Realschule) in 1916.

== Conversion into Orthodoxy, first arrest, execution and work in Tikhvin ==
At age 12, Edward chose to secretly attend Orthodox church. In 1917, he underwent re-baptism in the Orthodox church and through lots received the name Sergius (after Sergius of Radonezh). In 1918 the boy left for Savvo-Krypetskiy Monastery of John the Theologian.

In 1919 Bolsheviks arrested Sergius assuming that he was from a Tsarist family. Latvian Riflemen came suddenly to the monastery and took him in custody. Close to the Feast of Pokrov (Protection) of Mother of God he was sent for execution but remained alive after being wounded in the right arm. In the night the wounded Sergius was pulled out of the pile of corpses by monks, disguised in a Red Army uniform, and delivered to his mother and then taken for treatment to the military hospital in Tikhvin. In the hospital in Tikhvin the physicians managed to cope with gangrene and save his arm.

In Tikhvin, Sievers got to know the bishop of Tikhvin Alexiy (Simanskiy), the future patriarch, at whom he became hypo-deacon. Remaining in Tikhvin, Sievers became the club manager, read educational lectures in the hospitals, went on missions regarding the provision issues. He secured the connection of patriarch Tikhon with "disgraced" clerics namely with the imprisoned Novgorod metropolitan Arseniy and others. Sievers's position (January 1919) was letter-carrier on the Saint Petersburg section of the Moscow - Vindavo - Rybinsk railway. According to the documents of Central State Archives of Saint Petersburg the last secular position of Sievers was service as manager of Tikhvin garrison club in 1919-1922.

With the help of bishop Alexiy, Sievers entered into Alaxandre-Nevsky Lavra in May 1921. He was tonsured by vladyka Nicholas Yarushevich receiving new name Symeon. January 19, 1925 was consecrated into the rank of hieromonk (priest-monk). At the same time, when accepted into hieromonks, he became the treasurer of the Lavra. Sievers also studied at the Saint Petersburg's (Russian Orthodox) Theological Institute (finished in 1925). In 1928 hieroschemonk Serafim Vyritskiy blessed father Symeon Sievers for elderdom.

== Second arrest and deportation to Svirlag labor camp ==
The Alexandro-Nevsky Lavra was closed in 1932 and all monks were arrested. Symeon was taken to SvirLAG and later to Uzbekistan. The documents of Archives of Russian Federal Security Service offices in Leningrad region relate that from 1932 the monk was in Svirlag (Svirskiy Forced Labour Capm) on the river Svir (Leningrad oblast). Afterwards, Sievers was transferred to imprisonment in the Soviet Republic of Uzbekistan. On May 9, he was to be drowned in the Great Fergana Canal, but Kolkhoz workers pulled him out; on the way to the cemetery, water spilled and he revived.

== Short liberation, third arrest and deportation to the Far East ==
He was released in 1934 and taken into custody again in 1936, kept in prison in Borisoglebsk, after being convicted according to the article 5810 of the Criminal Code Part 1. He faced several years in prison on the Far East.

== Liberation of 1945: as priest to Kolguta in Stavropol region ==
In 1945, an order was issued commanding the liberation of all church clerics. In August 1945, he decided to flee, reaching Kirgizia and from there flew on "kukuruznik" to Tashkent. In 1946 he got over to Stavropol to the metropolitan Anthony who gave him a parish first in Vinodelnoye and after in 1947 as the parish priest in the big Ukrainian cossack village (stanitsa) Kolguta, Stavropol Region. The appearance of an elder in the village concerned the local authorities and he was arrested again. spending a year in the prison in Baku.

== Priestly service in Ruzayevka, Makarovka and Spasskoye (Republic of Mordovia) ==
In 1948, and in bad health, he moved to Borisoglebsk in Voronezh region (south Russia). Penza archbishop Cyril appointed him the parish priest in the temporary temple in the town of Ruzayevka in Mordovia. His next parish was Makarovka lying next to Mordovian capital Saransk. In Makarovka, Symeon acquired a passport, which he had not had for the past 5 years.

His last place of service in Mordovia was the village of Spasskoye. Then he was sent to serve at Poltava Women's Monastery in Poltava, Ukraine, during 1956-1958 as second priest at the Kazan Cathedral of Volgograd, and then to Pskov Pechersk Monastery on the Estonian border from 1958 to 1963. From 1963 to 1979 Symeon lived in Moscow. On September 16, 1966 Symeon received holy Great Schema with the name Sampson after Saint Sampson the Hospitable. He died on August 24, 1979. A memorial service was served at the Church of Saint Nicholas in Kuznetsy and he was buried at Nikolo-Archangelski cemetery in Moscow.
