= Novospassky (inhabited locality) =

Novospassky (Russian: Новоспасский; masculine), Novospasskaya (Новоспасская; feminine), or Novospasskoye (Новоспасское; neuter) is the name of several inhabited localities in Russia.

Urban localities

- Novospasskoye, Ulyanovsk Oblast, a work settlement in Novospassky Settlement Okrug of Novospassky District, Ulyanovsk Oblast

Rural localities

- Novospassky (rural locality), a settlement in Privolzhsky District of Samara Oblast
- Novospasskoye, Lipetsk Oblast, a selo in Mikhaylovsky Selsoviet of Stanovlyansky District of Lipetsk Oblast
- Novospasskoye, Nizhny Novgorod Oblast, a selo in Pochinkovsky Selsoviet of Pochinkovsky District of Nizhny Novgorod Oblast
- Novospasskoye, Alexandrovsky District, Orenburg Oblast, a selo in Zhdanovsky Selsoviet of Alexandrovsky District of Orenburg Oblast
- Novospasskoye, Matveyevsky District, Orenburg Oblast, a selo in Novospassky Selsoviet of Matveyevsky District of Orenburg Oblast
- Novospasskoye, Saratov Oblast, a selo in Pugachyovsky District of Saratov Oblast
- Novospasskoye, Smolensk Oblast, a village in Novospasskoye Rural Settlement of Yelninsky District of Smolensk Oblast
- Novospasskoye, Tambov Oblast, a selo in Novospassky Selsoviet of Pervomaysky District of Tambov Oblast
- Novospasskoye, Kimovsky District, Tula Oblast, a village in Lvovsky Rural Okrug of Kimovsky District of Tula Oblast
- Novospasskoye, Kireyevsky District, Tula Oblast, a village in Kuznetsovsky Rural Okrug of Kireyevsky District of Tula Oblast

== See also ==
- Spassky (rural locality), several rural localities in Russia
