= Spas, Lviv Raion, Lviv Oblast =

Rural locality in Lviv Oblast, Ukraine

Spas Спас
- Village
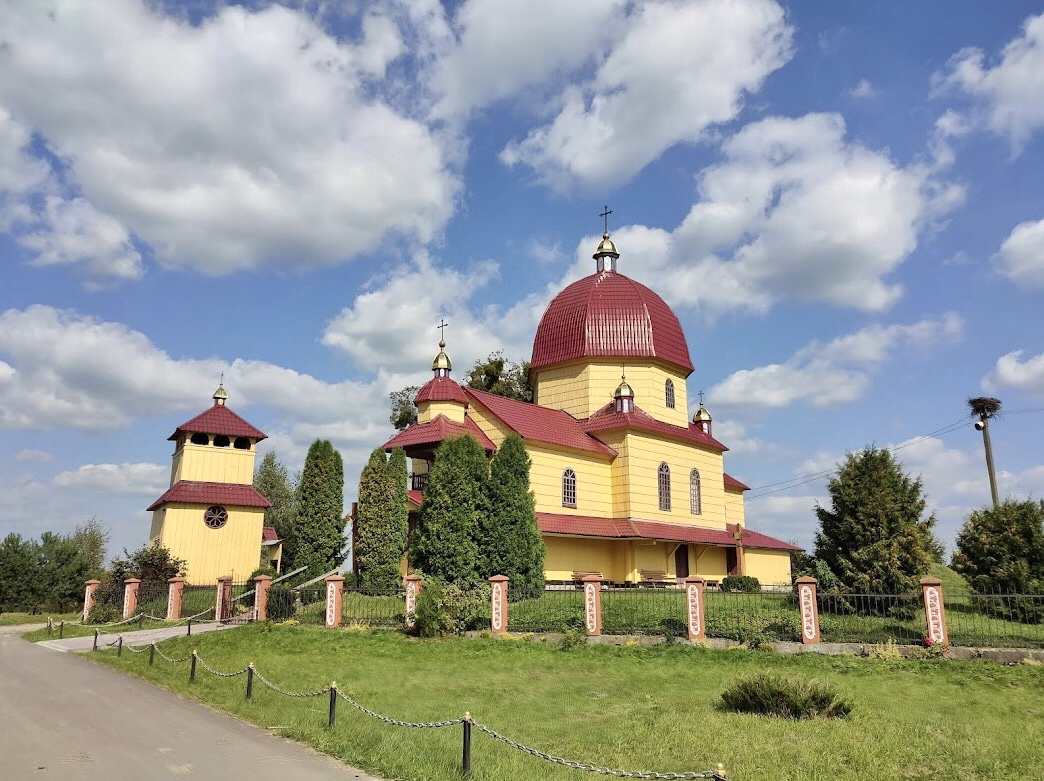
- Church in Spas

- Location within Lviv Oblast Location within Ukraine
- Coordinates: 50°02′49″N 24°28′44″E
- Country: Ukraine
- Oblast: Lviv Oblast
- District: Lviv Raion
- Established: 1493

Area
  - Total: 0,551 km^{2} (213 sq mi)
- Elevation /(average value of): 214 m (702 ft)

Population
  - Total: 207
  - Density: 50,091/km^{2} (129,740/sq mi)
- Time zone: UTC+2 (EET)
  - Summer (DST): UTC+3 (EEST)
- Postal code: 80451
- Area code: +380 3254
- Website: село Спас^{(Ukrainian)}

Spas (Ukrainian: Спас) is a small village (or selo) in the Lviv Raion (or district), of Lviv Oblast (province), which is in the western part of Ukraine. It is also part of the Kamianka-Buzka urban hromada, one of the many hromadas (analogous to a municipality) of Ukraine. The population of the village is just about 207 people, and local government is administered by Streptivska village council.

== Geography ==
Spas is located along the western bank of the Bug River, which flows north/northwest into the Vistula River in Poland. It is approximately 49 kilometres (30 mi) from the regional center of Lviv, and approximately 12 kilometres (7.5 mi) from the district center of Kamianka-Buzka. Spas is also approximately 73 kilometres (45 mi) from the city of Brody.

== History and Attractions ==
The official founding year of the village is considered to be 1493.

During the Second Polish Republic, until 1934, the village was an independent commune in Kamionecki County of the Tarnopol Voivodeship. On August 1, 1934, in connection with the administrative reforms, it was incorporated into the newly created rural collective commune of Żelechów Wielki (and partly into the commune of Kamionka Strumiłowa) in the same county and voivodeship. Po wojnie wieś weszła w struktury administracyjne Związku Radzieckiego. After the World War II, the village entered the administrative structures of the Soviet Union.

Until 18 July 2020, Spas belonged to Kamianka-Buzka Raion. However, the raion was abolished in July 2020 as part of a series of administrative reforms in Ukraine, which reduced the number of raions in Lviv Oblast down to seven. The area of Kamianka-Buzka Raion was also split between the Chervonohrad and Lviv Raions, with Spas being transferred to the Lviv Raion.

The village has an architectural monument of local importance to the Kamianka-Buzka Raion. The Church of the Transfiguration which was built in the early 20th century (2300M) in located in the village. There is also a public park to the village's immediate south.

== Notable people ==
- Stanislav Morozenko (born Stanisław Mrozowicki, also known as Nestor Morozenko, died 1649) - Zaporozhian Cossack colonel and hero of Ukrainian folklore, claimed to descend from Spas.

== Literature ==
- Історія міст і сіл УРСР : Львівська область, Стрептів. – К. : ГРУРЕ, 1968 р. Page 439 (in Ukrainian)
