= Kamianka-Buzka urban hromada =

Hromada in Lviv Oblast, Ukraine

Kamianka-Buzka urban hromada Кам'янка-Бузька міська громада
- Hromada
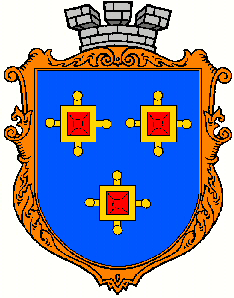
- Seal
- Interactive map of Kamianka-Buzka urban hromada
- Country: Ukraine
- Oblast: Lviv Oblast
- Raion: Lviv Raion
- Admin. center: Kamianka-Buzka

Area
  - Total: 3,444 km^{2} (1,330 sq mi)

Population (2021)
  - Total: 21,384
  - Density: 6.209/km^{2} (16.08/sq mi)
- CATOTTG code: UA46060190000038354
- Settlements: 29
- Cities: 1
- Villages: 28
- Website: kbmr.gov.ua

Kamianka-Buzka urban hromada (Ukrainian: Кам'янка-Бузька міська громада) is a hromada in Ukraine, in Lviv Raion of Lviv Oblast. The administrative center is the city of Kamianka-Buzka.

== Settlements ==
The hromada consists of 1 city (Kamianka-Buzka) and 28 villages:

- Batiatychi
- Vereny
- Vysokofedorivka
- Volia-Zhovtanetska
- Haiok
- Hrushka
- Dalnych
- Derevliany
- Derniv
- Zheldets
- Zabuzhzhia
- Zubiv Mist
- Krasychyn
- Lypnyky
- Maziarka
- Obydiv
- Prybuzhany
- Rozhanka
- Ruda
- Ruda-Siletska
- Sapizhanka
- Sokil
- Spas
- Streptiv
- Tadani
- Tovmach
- Yahidnia
- Yamne
