= Makarovka, Republic of Mordovia =

Rural locality in Saransk Urban Okrug, Mordovia, Russia

Coordinates: 54°09′30″N 45°15′39″E

Makarovka (Russian: Мака́ровка) is a village (selo) in the Republic of Mordovia, Russia, located within the administrative borders of the Republic's capital Saransk. Famous Russian Orthodox elder and wonder worker Sampson Sievers was a parish priest in this village during Soviet time. Here is situated Monastery of John the Evangelist in Makarovka.
