= Monastery of John the Evangelist in Makarovka =

Russian Orthodox monastery in Russia

- Макаровский Иоанно-Богословский монастырь (Russian)
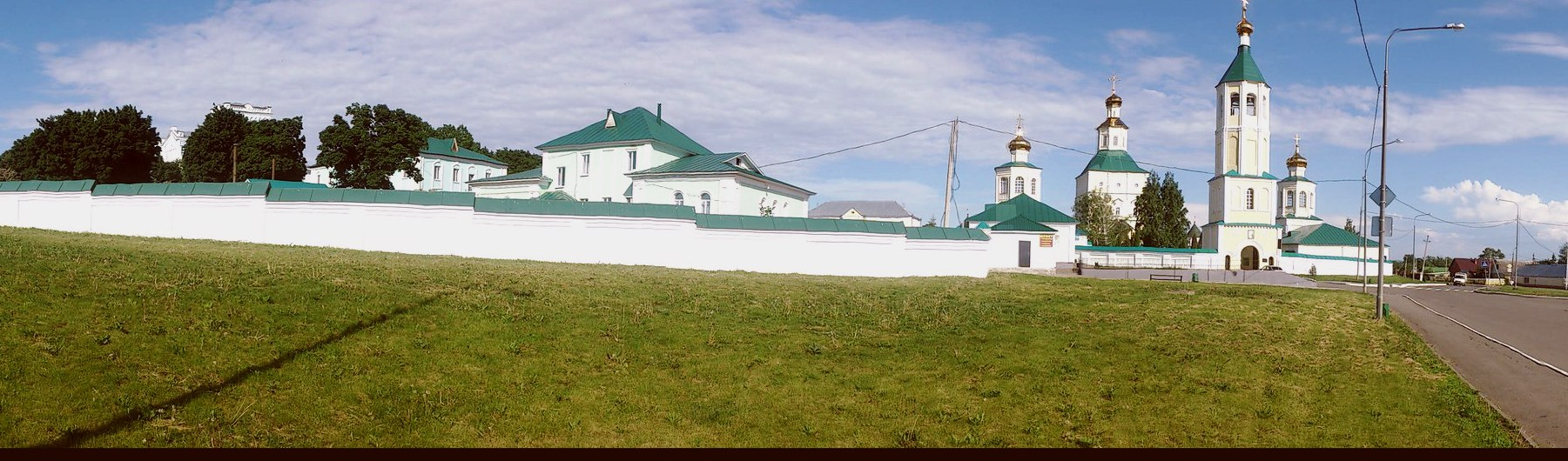
- Monastery of John the Evangelist in Makarovka
- Interactive map of Monastery of John the Evangelist in Makarovka
- 54°09′30″N 45°15′19″E
- Location: Saransk, Makarovka, Republic of Mordovia, Russia

Site notes
- Owner: Russian Orthodox Church
- Website: Official website

The Monastery of John the Evangelist is an active monastery of the Russian Orthodox Church. It is located in the village of Makarovka in the urban district of Saransk, Russia. The monastery is situated on the territory of the Makarov churchyard, which has existed since the early 18th century. It was founded in 1994. The residence of the Metropolitan of Saransk and Mordovia is located there.

== History ==
The monastery is located on land belonging to the boyars Polyansky since the 17th century. Makar Artemyevitch Polanski, who served in Moscow, became master of this land in 1686, moving to Saransk from Moscow. The churchyard was established in Saransk. In 1704, the Cathedral of John the Evangelist was built, later becoming a sanctuary for Polyansky for two years. After the Revolution, the churchyard lost all non-essential elements: the wall, the corner towers, Znamenskaya church and Saint Michael the Archangel church. Only the Cathedral of John the Evangelist and the bell towers remained. Missing features of the churchyard have been restored over time.

The manor-temple ensemble in Makarovka is the most interesting architectural feature of Mordovia.

== Architecture ==
=== Cathedral of John the Evangelist ===
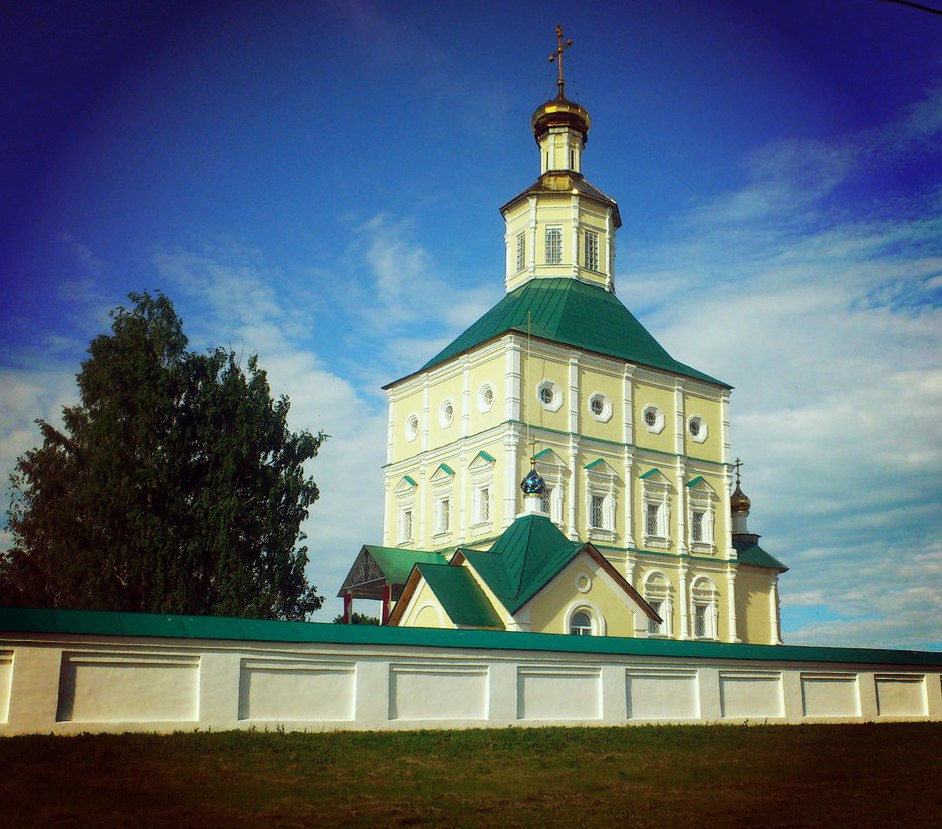
John the Evangelist cathedral

The Cathedral of John the Evangelist was built in 1704. It features an especially revered icon of Saint John the Evangelist, the arks with particles of the holy relics of the Kiev Pechersk reverend fathers and locally venerated saints of Mordovia.

The cathedral is one of the oldest surviving buildings in Mordovia.

=== Bell tower ===
The churchyard in Makarovka is enclosed by a fence. The bell tower, built into the fence, includes the main gates. The bell tower is said to have been built in the 1720s and 1730s. The total height of the bell tower is 36 m (118 ft).

The external decor is fairly simple and, like the cathedral, has some 17th-century elements.

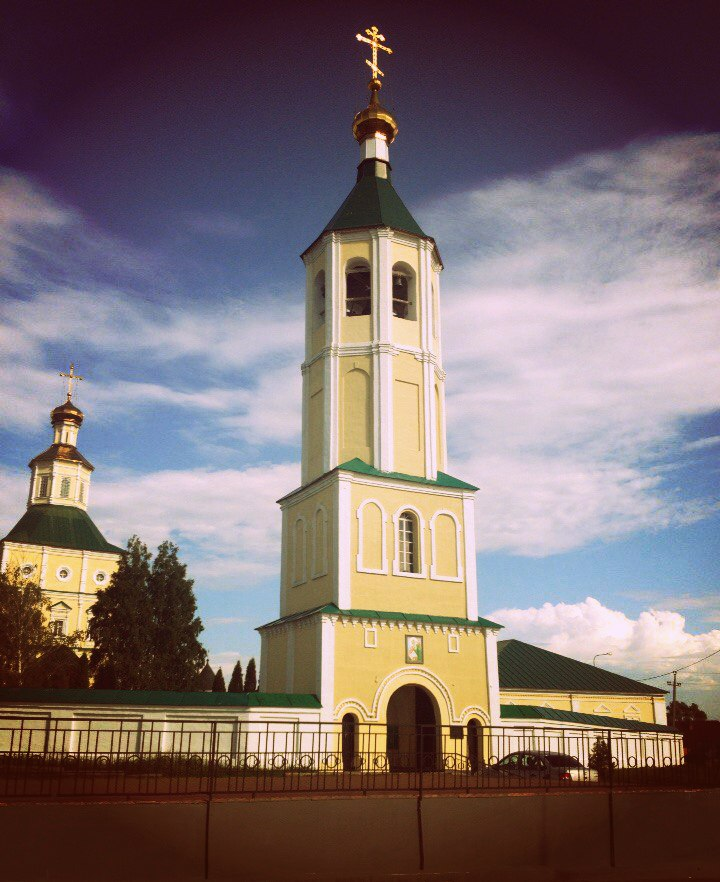
Bell tower

=== Saint Michael the Archangel church ===
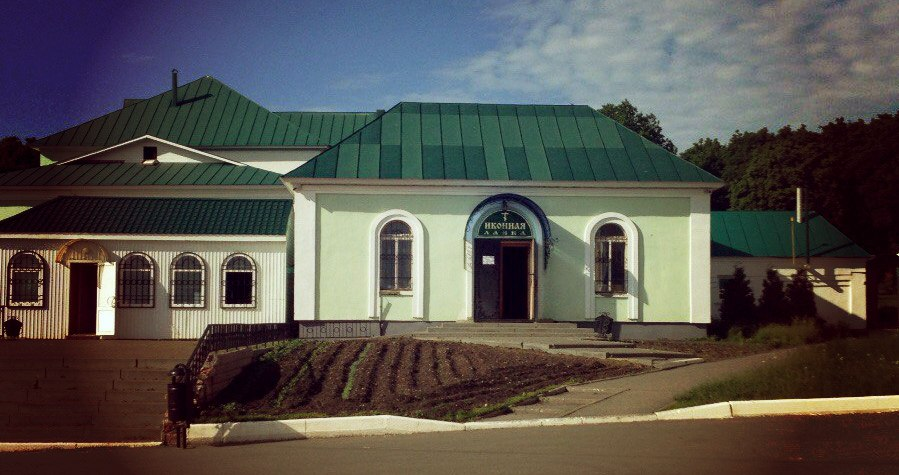
Icon shop

The Winter Church of Michael the Archangel was consecrated in 1702, demolished in 1935 (divine services ceased in 1935, and before destruction, the church was used as a granary). It was restored according to the drawings in the 1970s, housing the museum. It was re-consecrated on November 21, 2002. The men's hospice was attached in 1763 near the church.

=== Znamenskaya church ===
The Znamenskaya church was built in the 1800s. Its structure adjoined the fence. In 1930 the church was demolished, but rebuilt in 1970. Since 1991 worship has been conducted there.

=== Sacred Spring of Saint Nicholas ===
The spring's source flows from the hill near St. Nicholas Church, a wooden hilltop building. The springwater is healing and provides silver cations. The spring water tastes soft and fresh. Monks who laboured in the monastery prayed at the holy spring, sanctifying it with their prayers, and thus the water from it healed people of various diseases.

== Shrines ==
=== Our Lady "The Inexhaustible Chalice" ===
The icon of the Mother of God depicted in the Inexhaustible Chalice has become a Russian shrine. The icon is now in Pokrovsky cathedral at Vysotsky monastery.

=== Reliquaries ===
The relics of the holy fathers of the Kiev Caves are kept in two arks in the monastery.

== Makarovskaya hotel ==
The hotel of the missionary-pilgrim centre was opened near the Cathedral of John the Evangelist. Located in the new building, it is designed to accommodate 100 people. On the ground floor, there is a refectory with a large hall for 120 people and a small hall for 50 people. The hotel works round the clock.
