= Stanislav Morozenko =

Zaporozhian Cossack commander

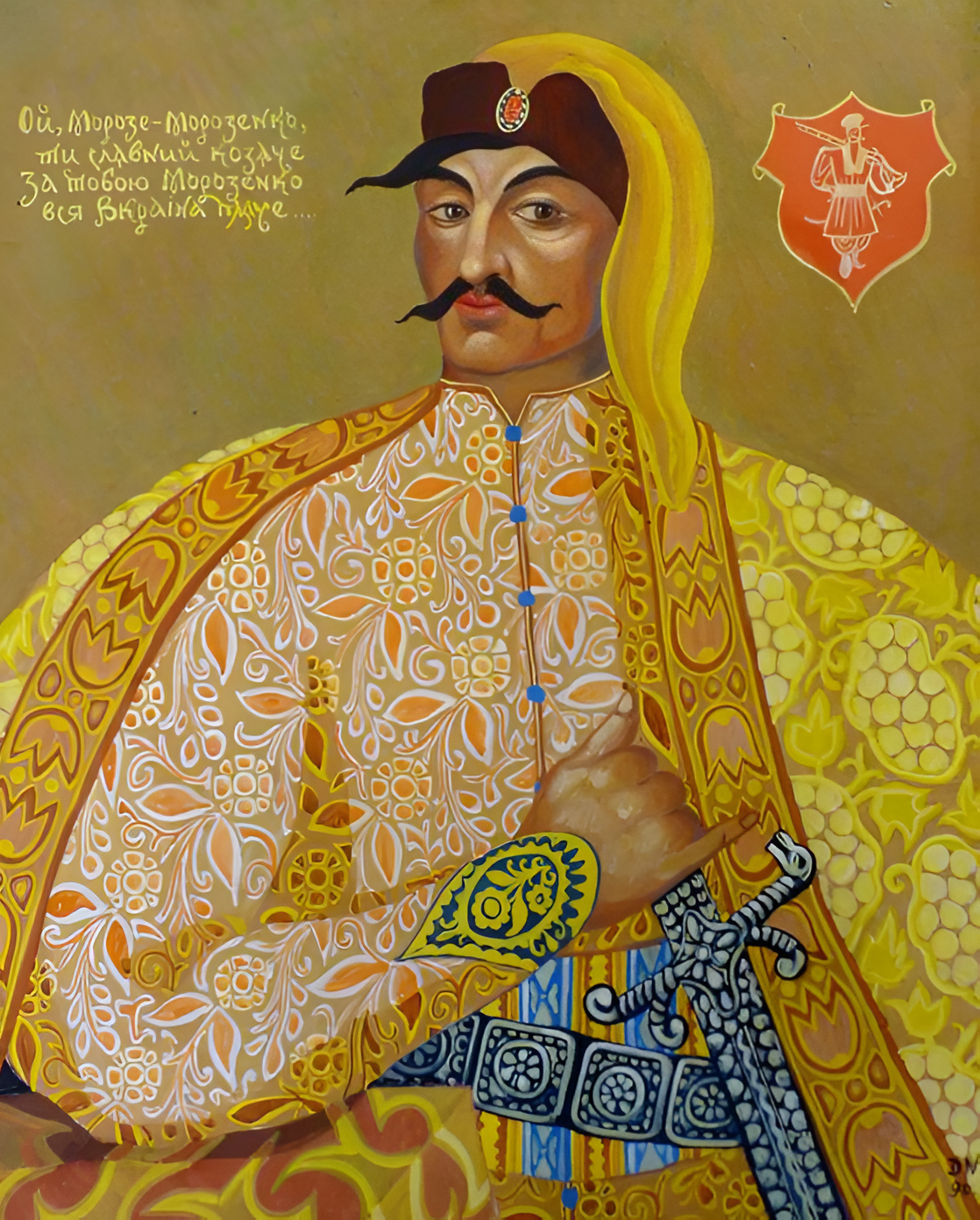
An imaginary portrait of Stanislav Morozenko by 20th-century Ukrainian painter Danylo Narbut

Stanisław Mrozowicki (died on 28 July 1649), known in Ukrainian tradition as Stanislav Morozenko (Ukrainian: Станіслав Морозенко) or Nestor Morozenko (Ukrainian: Нестор Морозенко), was a Zaporozhian Cossack colonel of Polish noble origin, known as one of the leaders of Khmelnytsky Uprising. Morozenko's death in battle made him a notable hero of Ukrainian folklore.

== Biography ==
Stanisław Mrozowicki was born into a noble family of Polish origin from Galician Podolia. Some sources claim the village of Spas in Belz Voivodeship as his likely birthplace. His father served as the deputy starost of Terebovlia. After studying at the universities of Krakow and Padua, Mrozowicki became a page at the court of king Władysław IV, but eventually left for Ukraine, joining the Registered Cossacks. Starting from 1645, he headed the Korsun Regiment.

In 1648 Morozenko joined the Cossack rebellion led by Bohdan Khmelnytsky, and became one of the leading generals of the insurgents. Commanding the rebel troops in Podolia, in August 1648 he attempted to capture Kamianets with the support of peasants and opryshky, but failed. Soon thereafter he took part in the Battle of Pyliavtsi. Afterwards he was reappointed by Khmelnytsky to serve as colonel of Korsun Regiment. During the Siege of Zbarazh in 1649 Morozenko commanded the Cossack cavalry, and fell in battle while fighting the troops of Jeremi Wiśniowiecki near the walls of Zbarazh Fortress.

== In folklore ==
Duma about Morozenko as performed by Ivan Kuchuhura-Kucherenko

Morozenko is known as the main hero of a popular Ukrainian folk song (duma), which has been preserved in several versions. Unlike the real historical circumstances, some versions of the song mention Savur-Mohyla as the site of his death.

== Sources ==
- Yakovenko, Natalia (2006). An Outline History of Medieval and Early Modern Ukraine. Krytyka. ISBN 9667679829.
