= Spas, Russia =

Spas (Russian: Спас) is the name of several rural localities in Russia:

== Kaluga Oblast ==
- Spas, Kaluga, Kaluga Oblast, a selo under the administrative jurisdiction of the City of Kaluga
- Spas, Babyninsky District, Kaluga Oblast, a village in Babyninsky District

== Kostroma Oblast ==
- Spas, Buysky District, Kostroma Oblast, a village in Tsentralnoye Settlement of Buysky District; 58°24′N 41°25′E
- Spas, Kostromskoy District, Kostroma Oblast, a selo in Shungenskoye Settlement of Kostromskoy District 57°54′N 40°16′E
- Spas, Nerekhtsky District, Kostroma Oblast, a selo in Volzhskoye Settlement of Nerekhtsky District 57°28′N 41°2′E
- Spas, Vokhomsky District, Kostroma Oblast, a selo in Vorobyevitskoye Settlement of Vokhomsky District; 59°10′N 46°43′E

== Smolensk Oblast ==
- Spas, Kardymovsky District, Smolensk Oblast, a village in Netrizovskoye Rural Settlement of Kardymovsky District
- Spas, Novoduginsky District, Smolensk Oblast, a village in Dneprovskoye Rural Settlement of Novoduginsky District

== Yaroslavl Oblast ==
- Spas, Danilovsky District, Yaroslavl Oblast, a selo in Vakhtinsky Rural Okrug of Danilovsky District
- Spas, Poshekhonsky District, Yaroslavl Oblast, a selo in Vasilyevsky Rural Okrug of Poshekhonsky District
- Spas, Yaroslavsky District, Yaroslavl Oblast, a village in Glebovsky Rural Okrug of Yaroslavsky District

== See also ==
- Spassk, several inhabited localities in Russia
- Spassky (disambiguation)
