= Spasskaya, Vologda Oblast =

Spasskaya Спасская
- Village
- Location within Vologda Oblast Location within Russia
- Coordinates: 59°57′N 40°22′E
- Country: Russia
- Region: Vologda Oblast
- District: Kharovsky District
- Time zone: UTC+3:00

Spasskaya (Russian: Спасская) is a rural locality (a village) in Ilyinskoye Rural Settlement, Kharovsky District, Vologda Oblast, Russia. The population was 1 as of 2002.

== Geography ==
Spasskaya is located 11 km east of Kharovsk (the district's administrative centre) by road. Ivachinskaya is the nearest rural locality.
