= Spa (disambiguation) =

A spa is a therapeutic water treatment.

Spa or SPA may also refer to:

== Water ==
- Day spa
- Destination spa
- Mineral spa
- Spa town, a town noted for its spa

== Places ==
=== Europe ===
- Circuit de Spa-Francorchamps, or Spa, a motor-racing circuit in Francorchamps, Belgium
- Spain, UNDP country code
- Spa, Belgium, a municipality in Belgium
- Spa, County Down, a village in Northern Ireland
- Spa, County Kerry, a village in Ireland

=== Other places ===
- South Pole–Aitken basin, an impact crater on the far side of the Moon
- Spa Creek, a tributary of the Severn River, Annapolis, Maryland, US

== Art, entertainment and media ==
- SPA (band), a 1990s British band
- Spa (Sirius XM), a satellite radio music channel
- Screen Producers Australia, film industry organization
- Sony Pictures Animation, an American animation studio
- Summer Performing Arts Company, Grand Forks, North Dakota, US

== Businesses and organizations ==
=== Government and politics ===
- Saudi Press Agency
- Service Prosecuting Authority, an agency of the Ministry of Defence in the United Kingdom
- Seychelles Port Authority
- Socialist Party of America
- Socialist Party of Australia
- Socialistische Partij Anders (SP.A), a Flemish Social-Democratic Party
- Supreme People's Assembly, the parliament of North Korea

=== Education ===
- Schools of Planning and Architecture, in India
- Society for Popular Astronomy, UK

=== Business and industry ===
- Spa (mineral water), a brand of Belgian mineral water
- Scottish Publishers Association
- Sociedade Portuguesa de Autores, a Portuguese copyright-management company
- Software Publishers Association, former name of the Software and Information Industry Association
- Sudanese Professionals Association, Sudanese trade union and civic organisation
- S.P.A. (automobile), Società Piemontese Automobili, a car manufacturer (1908–1926)

== Law and economics ==
- Sales and purchase agreement
- Special power of attorney, in law
- Special Protection Area, EU, for birds
- Società per azioni (S.p.A.), a type of public limited company in Italy

== Science and technology ==
=== Computing ===
- Secure Password Authentication
- Sense Plan Act, a robot control methodology
- Simple power analysis, a type of cryptographic attack
- Single-page application, a type of web application or app

=== Biology and medicine ===
- Scintillation proximity assay, for biochemical development and screening
- Spathoglottis, an orchid genus
- Spondyloarthropathy (SpA), any joint disease of the vertebral column

=== Vehicles ===
- Volvo Scalable Product Architecture platform, an automobile platform created by Volvo Cars

== Philosophy ==
- Socrates, Plato and Aristotle, the traditional founders of Western philosophy

== See also ==
- Hot tub
- Resort
