= Novospasskoye, Ulyanovsk Oblast =

Novospasskoye Новоспасское
- Urban-type settlement
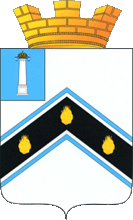
- Flag Coat of arms
- Interactive map of Novospasskoye
- Location of Novospasskoye Novospasskoye (Ulyanovsk Oblast)
- Coordinates: 53.1484°N 47.7540°E
- Country: Russia
- Federal subject: Ulyanovsk Oblast
- Administrative district: Novospassky District
- Founded: 17th century
- Elevation: 80 m (260 ft)

Population (2010 Census)
  - Total: 11,075
  - Estimate (2021): 10,780 (−2.7%)
- Time zone: UTC+4 (UTC+04:00)
- Postal codes: 433870, 433871
- OKTMO ID: 73629151051

Novospasskoye (Russian: Новоспа́сское) is an urban locality (an urban-type settlement) in Novospassky District of Ulyanovsk Oblast, Russia. Population: 11,075 (2010 census); 11,038 (2002 census); 9,915 (1989 Soviet census).
