= Kamianka-Buzka =

City in Lviv Oblast, Ukraine

Kamianka-Buzka Кам'янка-Бузька
- City
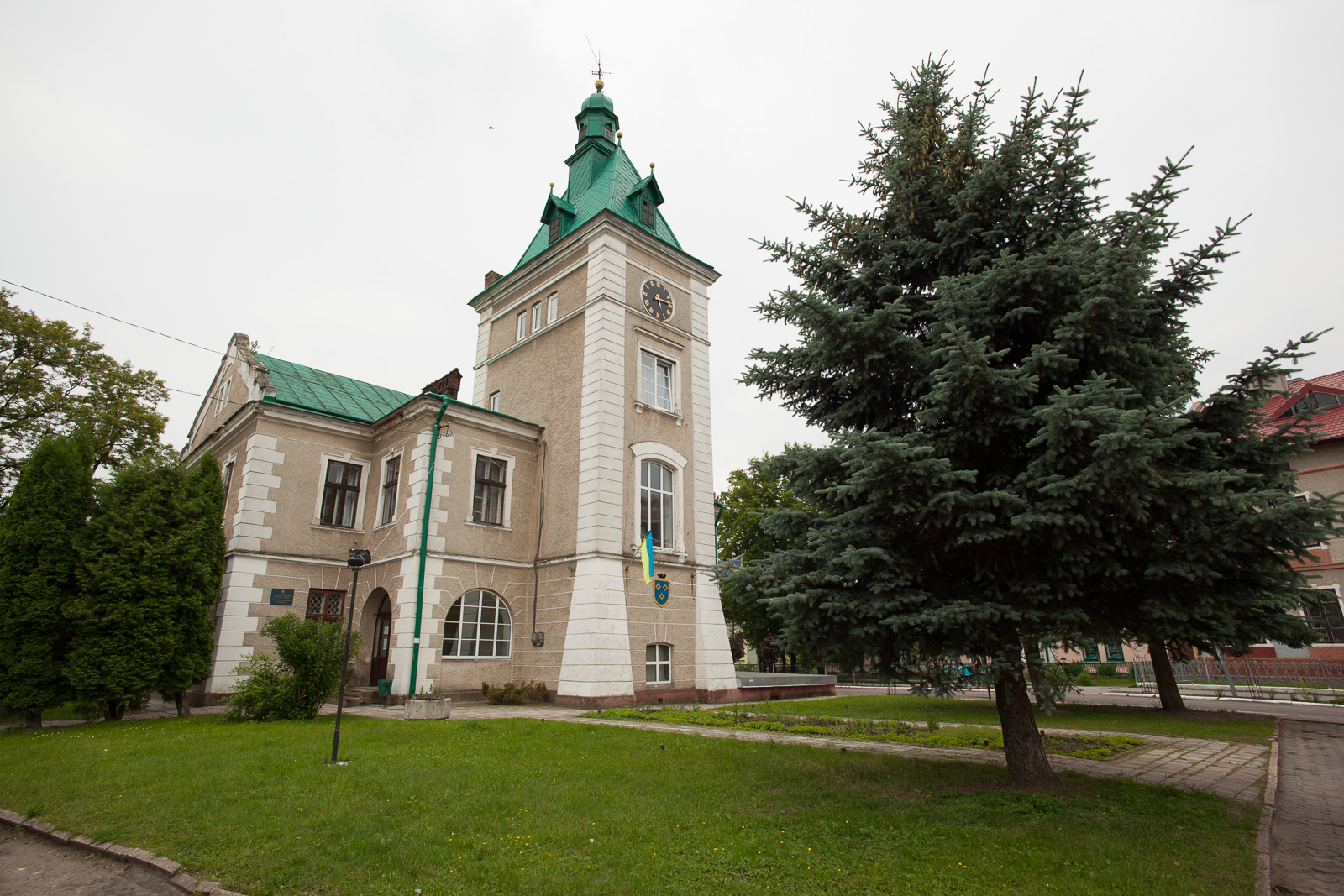
- City Hall

- Flag Coat of arms
- Interactive map of Kamianka-Buzka
- Location of Kamianka-Buzka Kamianka-Buzka (Ukraine)
- Coordinates: 50°06′0″N 24°21′0″E
- Country: Ukraine
- Oblast: Lviv Oblast
- Raion: Lviv Raion
- Hromada: Kamianka-Buzka urban hromada
- City since: 1471

Area
  - Total: 8.63 km^{2} (3.33 sq mi)

Population (2022)
  - Total: 10,397
  - Density: 1,200/km^{2} (3,120/sq mi)
- Postal code: 80400—80404
- Area code: +380 3254
- Website: KamBuz.org.ua

Kamianka-Buzka (Ukrainian: Кам'янка-Бузька, romanized: Kamianka-Buzka, IPA: [ˈkɑmjɐnkɐ ˈbuzʲkɐ]; Polish: Kamionka Strumiłowa) is a city in Lviv Raion, Lviv Oblast, western Ukraine. It hosts the administration of Kamianka-Buzka urban hromada, one of the hromadas of Ukraine. The city was previously known as Kamianka Strumilova, and was a district city in Galicia. From 1918 to 1939 it was part of Poland, and called Kamionka Strumiłowa, was the capital of a county of the Tarnopol Voivodeship. Population: 10,397 (2022 estimate).

== Geography ==
=== Location ===
Kamianka-Buzka is located 40 km (25 mi) northeast of Lviv and 26 km (16 mi) to the north of the nearest Karol Ludwik Railway station in Zadviria; between the latitude of 50.5° and 50.8° North and the longitude of 41.58° and 42.4° East.

There are two villages to the north of the city: Yahidnia and Prybuzhany; Zabuzhzhia and Tadani to the east; Tadani, Sapizhanka and Derniv to the south; Batiatychi to the west.

The whole area is situated in the Vistula river basin, on the Bug River. The latter flows along the south-eastern border; from the east to the west; it turns to the north-west later and, then, it flows across the middle part of the area in the northern direction forming arms to fall into the village of Lapaiivka. The Kamianka river (or Sosnowiec) is one of the tributaries; it falls into the Bug River on the left bank-side. The Kamianka river flows on the small area along the border, then, it crosses the city centre flowing from the south to the north where it falls into the Bug River. There are city and suburban buildings in the Bug River valley. They are in the Kamianka river valley, too. The city takes up the valley space and there are brick houses in the market square but the wooden houses prevail; the suburbs on the left bank of the Kamianka river are called: Belzkyi, Pidzamche and Lvivskyi; there is a Zabuzhanskyi suburb on the right river bank.

The western part of the area rises more above the valley than the part in the east and it reaches the peak of Kamienna Gora at 258m above the sea level. It is the highest peak in the area. The highest peak in the east rises 232m above the sea level. The Farastwo (or Farastow) hill lowers towards the eastern line at 222m above the sea level. The city takes up the space of 6/10 square miles.

=== City area ===
The manorial area has 520 morga of farmland, 77 of meadows and gardens, 11 of pastureland. The minor estate has 2274 morga of farmland, 276 of meadows and gardens, 282 of pastureland. The soil is fertile. It is mainly humus.

== History ==
Historical affiliations

Crown of the Kingdom of Poland 1411–1569
Polish–Lithuanian Commonwealth 1569–1772
Habsburg monarchy 1772–1804
Austrian Empire 1804–1918
West Ukrainian People's Republic 1918-1919
Second Polish Republic 1919–1945
Soviet Union (Ukrainian SSR) 1939–1941
Nazi Germany 1941–1944 (occupation)
Soviet Union (Ukrainian SSR) 1944–1945
Soviet Union (Ukrainian SSR) 1945–1991
Ukraine 1991–present

=== Origin of the name ===
Kamianka was first mentioned in 1441. It used to bear the name of Dymoszyn (refer to Kronika Dzieduszyckich p. 38) and was the property of Jerzy Strumillo. The city was named Kamianka after huge stone blocks, which are probably erratic, located in the local fields and in the neighbouring fields in the west. The Strumilowa cognomen was added to pay homage to Jerzy Strumillo, the city owner. Jerzy Strumillo, who was the city of Lviv chamberlain, granted the village of Kamianka the civic rights. In the year of 1471 he also founded and furnished the Latin Church parish in Kamianka.

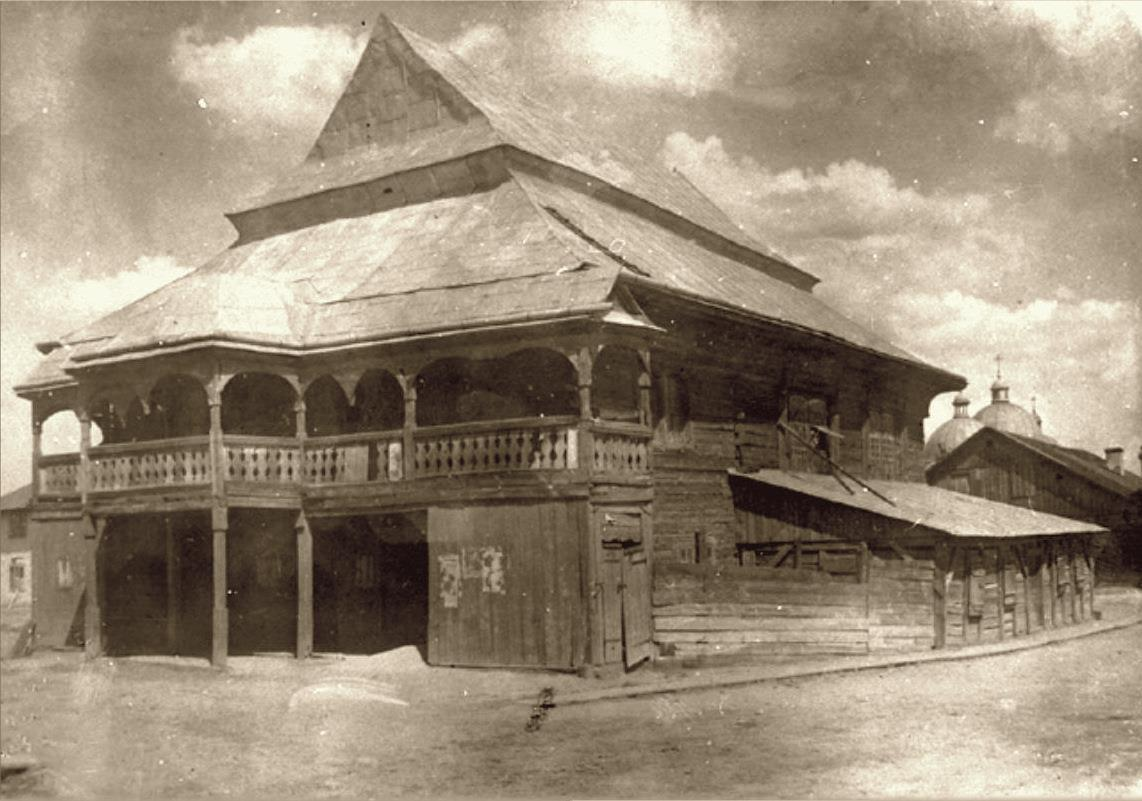
Historical photo of the wooden synagogue once located in the city

=== Polish rule ===
==== Charters ====
The kings who ruled the country chartered the city over the centuries. These are the most important charters:

- the charter of 1509 - Sigismund I, the king, restored the Magdeburg Law,
- the charter of 1539 – on the strength of it, duties were imposed on wine which was taken abroad; the money which the city made was to cover the costs of buildings and the city walls repairs,
- the charter of 1578, laid down by Stefan, the king of Poland, sets the standards of the Drohobycz salt ingredients. It also binds the merchants who take the salt to the Volyn region to stay in the city for three days,
- In the year of 1589, Sigismund III Vasa, the king, sanctioned the agreement between the city inhabitants and the Jews, which permitted Jews to settle down in the city, to purchase properties and to trade. The guilds of furriers and shoemakers were granted rights by the same king, who also accepted the products of weavers, blacksmiths and of the guilds which were already mentioned. Jan Pruchnicki, the archbishop of Lviv, permitted Jews to raise a synagogue in the city. He did it in compliance with the law and the rules by his predecessors,
- the charter of 1642 – it made the starosty permit the city inhabitants to fish with fishing rods, with fishing- and troll-nets in the local ponds. At the same time, this charter forced the inhabitants to net the fish and participate in hunts, which were organized twice a year. There was an exception: they were not forced to do this work when a king or his representatives wanted to hunt on their own.

==== Reports ====
In 1662, when the war with the Swedes ended, the court inspectors reported: "500 buildings used to stand here; there are only 90 of them now. 16 of them belong to Jews. The castle near the city is surrounded by the moat and the fence. The tower which overlooks the city is inhabited by a court writer. The nearby tower is the city gate". The city was not restored after the damage caused by the war because the court inspectors reported these words in 1766: "no inns are suitable for staying there; none of them are run by the Catholics. The inhabitants do not engage themselves in trade ‘magis araturae et piscaturae quam mercaturae dediti’; only grease is sold in the market square. It is used to smear carts and it is produced in the forest, which belongs to the starost. There are 6 small Catholic houses in the city centre, 67 cottages in the suburbs, 39 building plots with gardens. 108 landholders and 52 yeomen live in the suburbs. There are 29 inns run by Jews in the city centre; 57 Jewish houses and cottages. The castle used to stand near the grange in the city neighbourhood on the Kamianka river. The castle was destroyed a long time ago. It lies in ruins."

==== City status ====
Kamianka used to be a royal city. It was also ‘starostwo niegrodowe’. Until the Partitions of Poland (1772), it was part of the Lwow Land, Ruthenian Voivodeship.

===== Starosts =====
The following men were the starosts in Kamianka:

- Piotr Zborowski (in 1513) – he was also the voivode in Kraków,
- Spytek Jordan of Melsztyn (in 1559) – he was also the castellan in Kraków,
- Michał Wiśniowiecki, the prince (in 1608),
- Stanisław Żółkiewski (in 1615),
- Gorajski (in 1648) – he was also the castellan in Chełm,
- Stanisław Radziejowski (in 1665),
- Michał Rzewuski (in 1765) – the Podolia voivode and the starost in Drohowyze and Zydaczow cities,
- Franciszka née Cetner (by the act of September 25, 1759, which was granted to her by August III, the king).

===== Starosty area =====
The starosty area consisted of the following cities: Kamianka Strumilowa with the commission of 9832 Polish zloty, of which 2333 Polish zloty was the tax for the maintenance of the Polish regular army; the grange of Podzamcze Kamioneckie with the commission of 291 Polish zloty; of the villages: Jazienica Labuzanska with the commission of 456 Polish zloty; Obydow with the commission of 376 Polish zloty; Lany with the commission of 664 Polish zloty; Dernow with the commission of 996 zloty; Ruda and Jazienica Rudenska with the commission of 2932 Polish zloty; of the towns: Dobrotwor which had belonged to the Busk starosty – in 1764 it joined the Kamianka starosty due to the act of the Seym; its commission was 6400 Polish zloty; Wiesniowa Strychanka with the commission of 510 Polish zloty. The starosty owned the Wojtostwo which consisted of the village called Lapajowka (on the strength of the act of February 7, 1776 imposed by August III) with the commission of 469 Polish zloty. The starosty, the neighbouring places and the Wojtostwo entered into possession of the count, whose name was Ignacy Cetner, on the strength of the act of April 1, 1787. It was done as a partial equivalent for the Nadworna estate which were taken by the salt mines. The court inspection was carried in the Kamianka starosty and the neighbourhood in 1766. The report was published in the weekly magazine called Dodatek tygodniowy do Gazety Lwowskiej which was printed in 1869 (issues of 14, 15, 16, 17, 18, 20, 22 and 23).

==== Found artifacts ====
People used to come across weapons, clay utensils and other artifacts of archaeological value in Kamianka. For example, an ancient sabre with the blade curved and the iron hilt, a cinenary urn were found there. Now, they are the exhibits in the Ossolinski Museum in Lviv.

=== 19th and 20th centuries ===
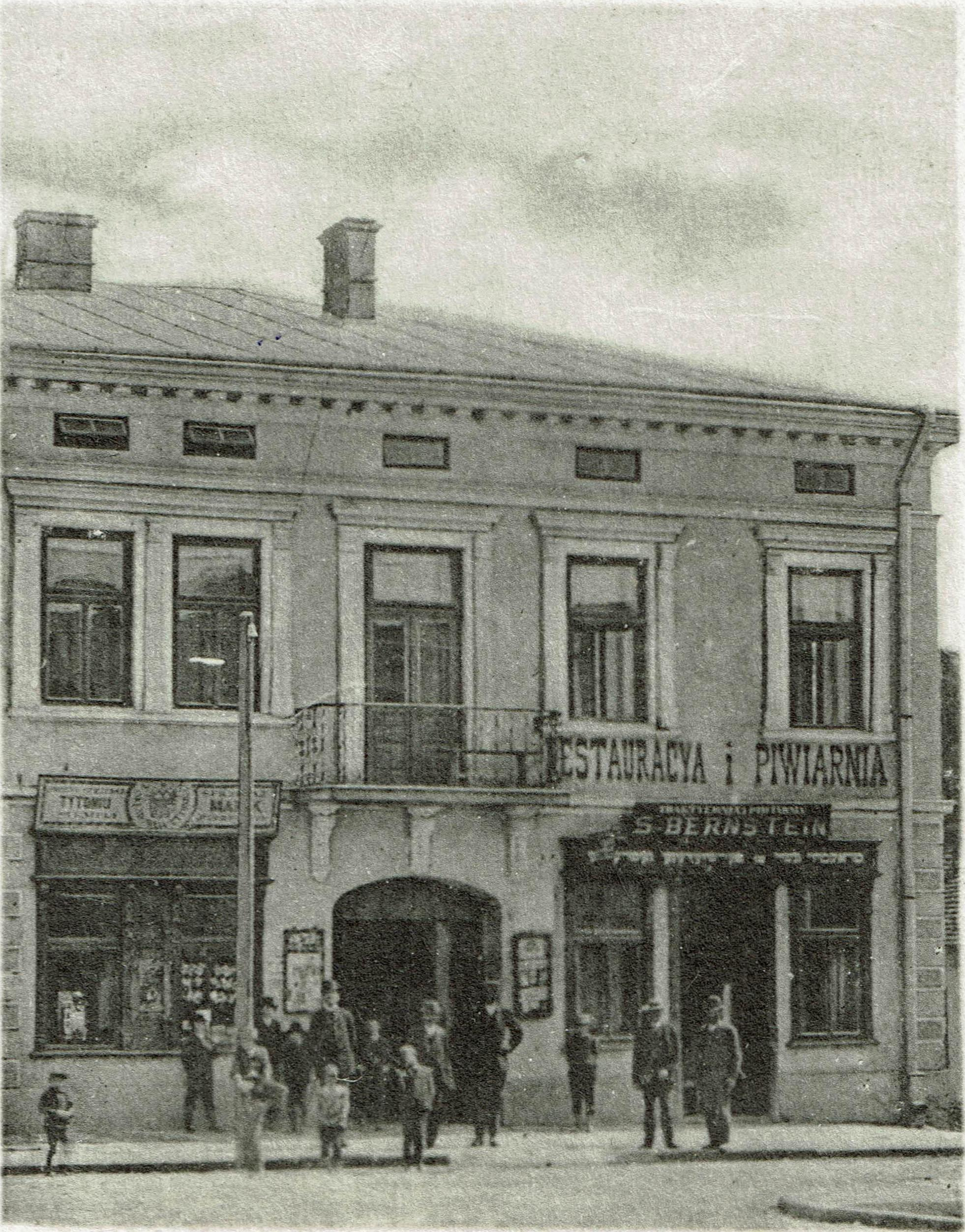
A Yiddish sign on a local restaurant

Under Austrian rule Kamianka served as a district centre. It preserved that status under the Second Polish Republic and in the Soviet Union.

In the late 19th century, farmers formed the majority of the city population. The group of craftsmen was mainly formed by shoemakers, tailors, blacksmiths, weavers, carpenters and potters. The stream-mill and the stream-sawmill contributed significantly to the development of the local industry. There was also an alcohol distillery, a brewery and a standard brick-yard. The local sawmill (with the power of 30 horses) produced pine-, oak- and ash- boards and flooring blocks. It used 2300 cubic meters of wood for 1500 cubic meters of the final product. There used to be a famous tan-yard in the beginning of the 19th century. Later, the tanning industry was not so common. In the 16th century, they used to make swords in this city. In the same century, there used to be a famous weaving-mill here. We can learn from the book of rights granted to the city in 1589 by the king of Poland, Sigismund III Vasa, that the following guilds operated in Kamianka Strumilowa: the guild of furriers, shoemakers, weavers, blacksmiths, tinsel-makers, locksmiths, coopers, fishermen, armourers, paper-mill workers, haberdashers, carpenters and turners. In the late 19th century, some of these guilds did not exist, some deteriorated. Actually, the entire local industry deteriorated. The residents used to make a lot of money from fishery. They fished for eels in the Bug River. The fishermen were granted special privileges by the city government. Those days, there were not any local fish-breeding ponds so the city ceased to make profits on this branch. People used to put rafts into the Bug river. Those days, people did not engage themselves in this activity. They did not engage much in trade either. Local fairs and markets were modest and insignificant. Those days, trade was carried on mainly by Jews. They sold cattle, salt, grain, lumber in the main. They sold also a small amount of fish. Markets were held every Tuesday and Friday. Fairs were held on January 19; on May 8; on September 10. The city assets equalled 162.148 Polish złoty and the liabilities 233 Polish złoty. The city revenue was 7740 Polish zloty in the year of 1881.

In the late 19th century there were municipal and district authorities buildings, a tax-collector's office (the second grade), a district court, a notary office, a committee of appraisal office, a district council building, a post and a telegraph offices in Kamianka. There is a five-grade school for boys with full-time teachers and a chemist's shop. Two physicians and two surgeons lived in the town.

There were also Roman Catholic parish offices which belong to Lviv archdioceses. The Roman Catholic parish belongs to Glinianski deanery. 38 villages belonged to this parish. These villages are: Batiatycze, Berbeki, Budki, Czertynie, Dalnicz, Dernow, Gaik, Henrykowka, Horajec, Jagonin, Jazienica Polska, Jazienica Ruska, Ignacowka, Konstantowka, Krasicze, Krzywulanka, Kupiczwola, Lany Niemieckie, Lany Polskie, Lapajowka, Maziarnia Gogulowa, Maziarnia Kamionecka, Neudorf, Nowystaw, Obydow, Podrudne, Podzamcze, Rozanka, Ruda, Sapiezanka, Sokole, Tlumacz, Turki, Zbaniow, Zbronce, Zdeszow, Zubow Most, Zeldec. The Greek Catholic parish has its branch in Sapiezanka and it belongs to Busk deanery.

=== Independent Ukraine ===
Until 18 July 2020, Kamianka-Buzka was the administrative center of Kamianka-Buzka Raion. The raion was abolished in July 2020 as part of the administrative reform of Ukraine, which reduced the number of raions of Lviv Oblast to seven. The area of Kamianka-Buzka Raion was split between Chervonohrad and Lviv Raions, with Kamianka-Buzka itself being transferred to Lviv Raion.

== Demographics ==
According to the census of 1880 there were 3751 residents in this city and in the suburb of Podzamcze. 1096 people lived in the Belzkie suburb, 756 in the Lwowskie and 684 in the Zabuzanskie suburbs. Then: 5,701 inhabitants; of which 590 (11.6%) were Roman Catholic, 1641 Greek Catholic (32.1%), 56 non-catholic (1.1%), 2820 Jewish (55.2%). During World War II, Jews of the town were murdered in mass execution perpetrated by an Einsatzgruppen.

== Culture ==
A 1411 gospel manuscript 1411 stemming from the city was later transported to Kyiv. The text of the book is recognized to contain elements of Volhynian dialect.

Kamianka-Buzka is considered the birthplace of the Ukrainian theatre, with the first theatrical productions by Jakub Gawat presented on the city market in 1619. In 1914 the town was the first place where Ivan Franko's drama "Stolen Happiness" was shown to public.

The town features prominently in book two of And Quiet Flows the Don by Mikhail Sholokhov.

== Economy ==
=== Industry ===
In modern times Kamianka functions as a centre of food industry and procession of wood. It also serves as a railway junction.

=== Transport ===
Kamianka-Buzka lies on the H17 Lviv-Radekhiv-Lutsk road. There are also 2 railway stations in the city.

== Institutions and monuments ==
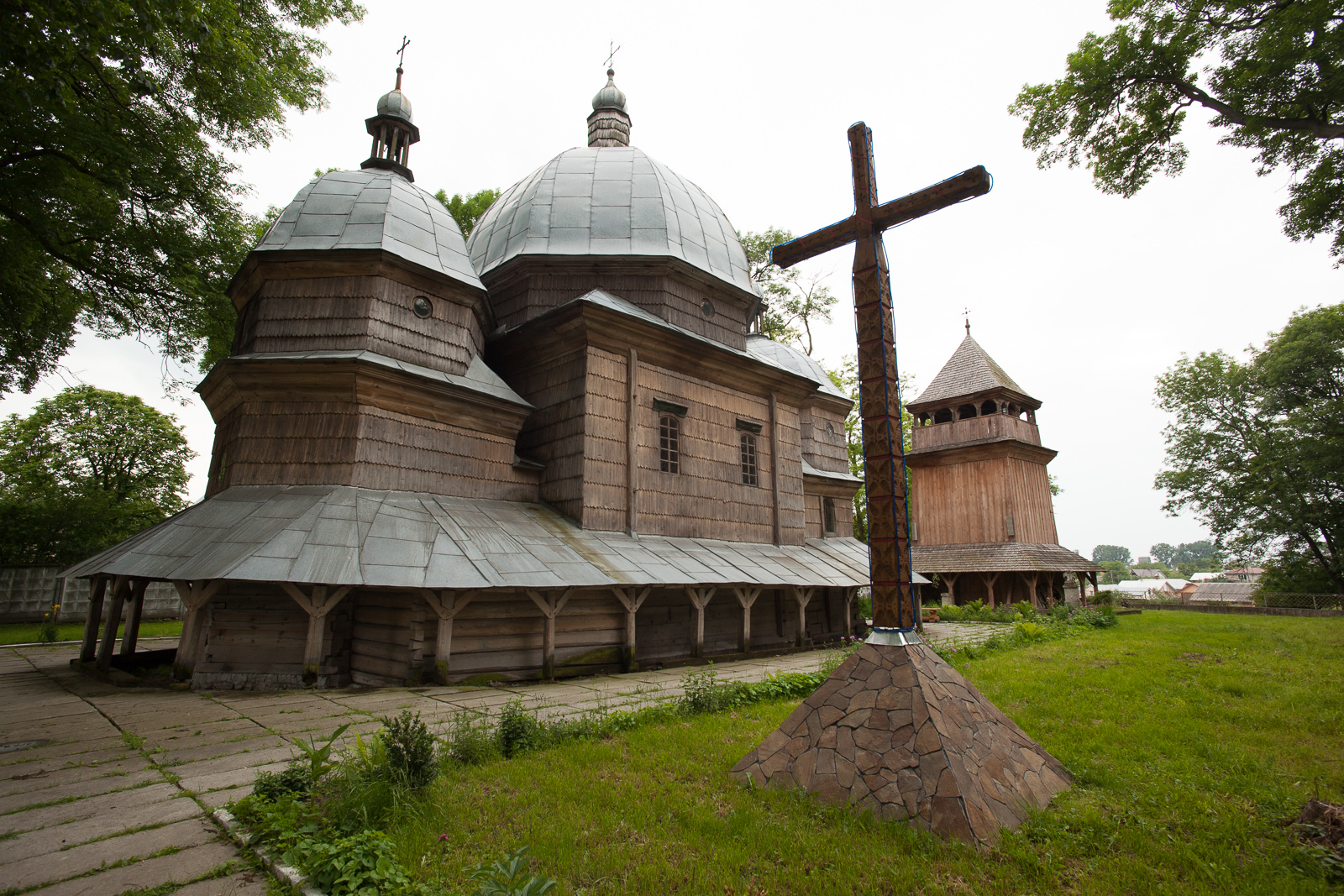
St. Nicholas Church

There is an old brick church of 1471 in Kamianka-Buzka. The church was founded by Jerzy Strumillo, who was the city of Lviv chamberlain. There are two Orthodox churches. The parochial Orthodox church, dedicated to Our Lady Nativity, is located in the city. The latter church, which is a branch, is situated in the suburb and is dedicated to St. Nicholas. The new Orthodox church was consecrated by Sylvester Sembratovych, the bishop. The consecration was celebrated on September 20, 1882. We can learn from the Kamianka starosty inspection book of 1766 that, according to the statement of a parish-priest, there used to be a small church dedicated to the Holy Ghost in the Belzkie suburb near the gate off the Glinisko field. Glinisko is the name of a ploughland which exists to the present day. Some local grounds belonged to this church. It was burnt down during the Tartar raids. A hospital and four cottages stood on the church spot at the times of the inspection mentioned. The same book mentions also an Orthodox church and a small Orthodox monastery of the Basilian nuns in Kamianka. These were dedicated to the Annunciation of Our Lady. The church and the monastery were founded by the city. The nearby garden belonged to the monastery. In Kamianka, there was a gmina loan society with the capital of 1977 Polish zloty.

Today there are 5 kindergartens, three schools and a vocational school in Kamianka-Buzka.

Among places of interest in modern Lamianka-Buzka are the wooden church of St. Nicholas (1667) and traces of old fortifications.

== Notable people ==
- Hryhoriy Tiutiunnyk - Ukrainian writer, lived in the city between 1948 and 1961 and composed one of his novels there.
- Lonhyn Tsehelsky - Ukrainian politician, author of the Unification Act.
- Roman Shukhevych - studied and later taught at a local school.
- Stefan Grabiński - Polish writer, was born there in 1887.
- Shalom Rozenfeld (1800–1851), rabbi.

== Gallery ==
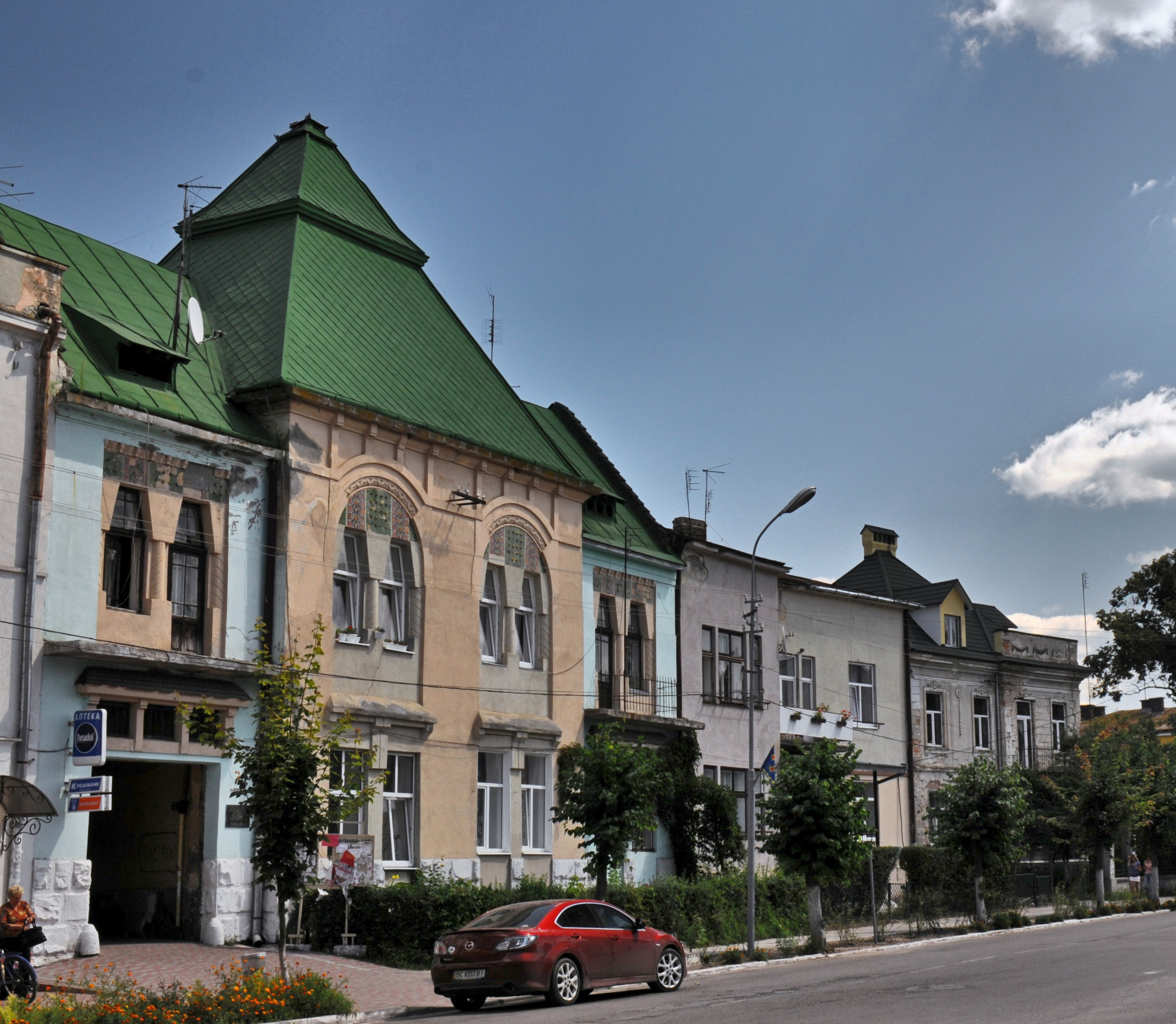
"People's House" in Kamianka-Buz'ka

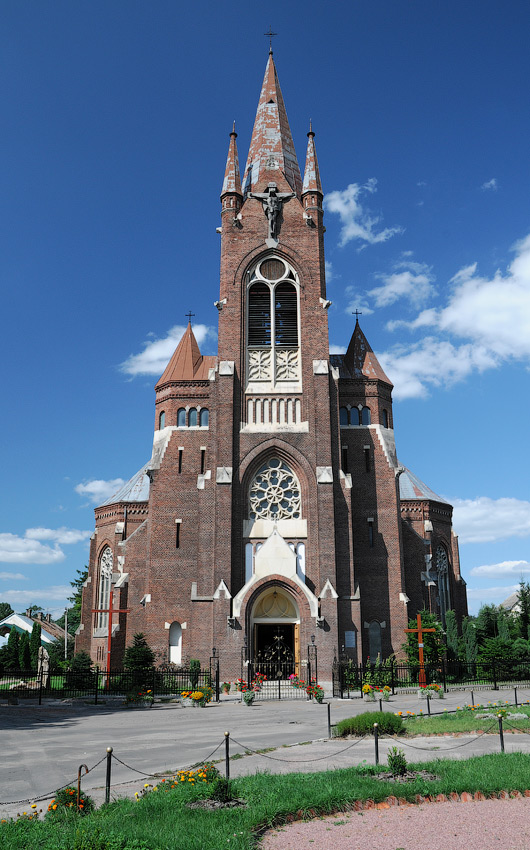
Church of Assumption

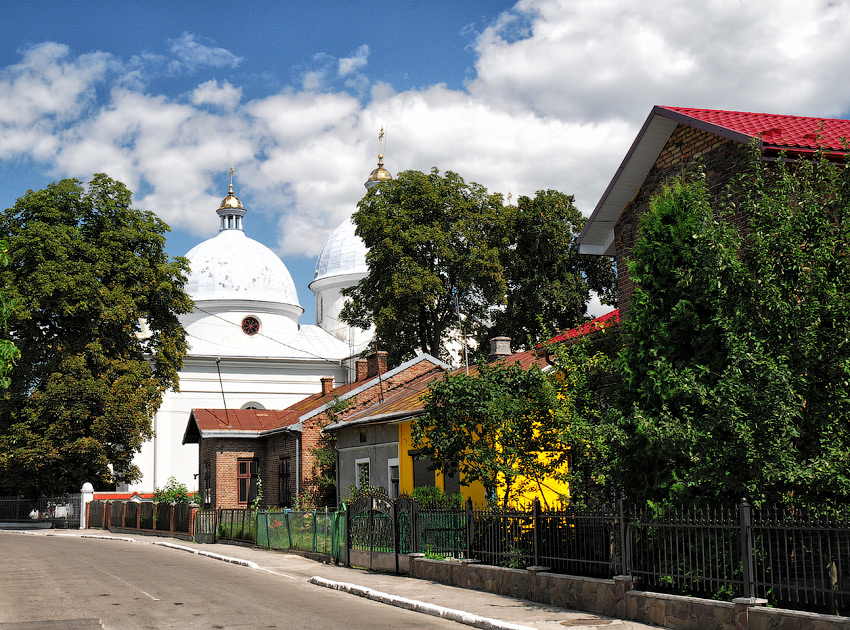
Church of Nativity

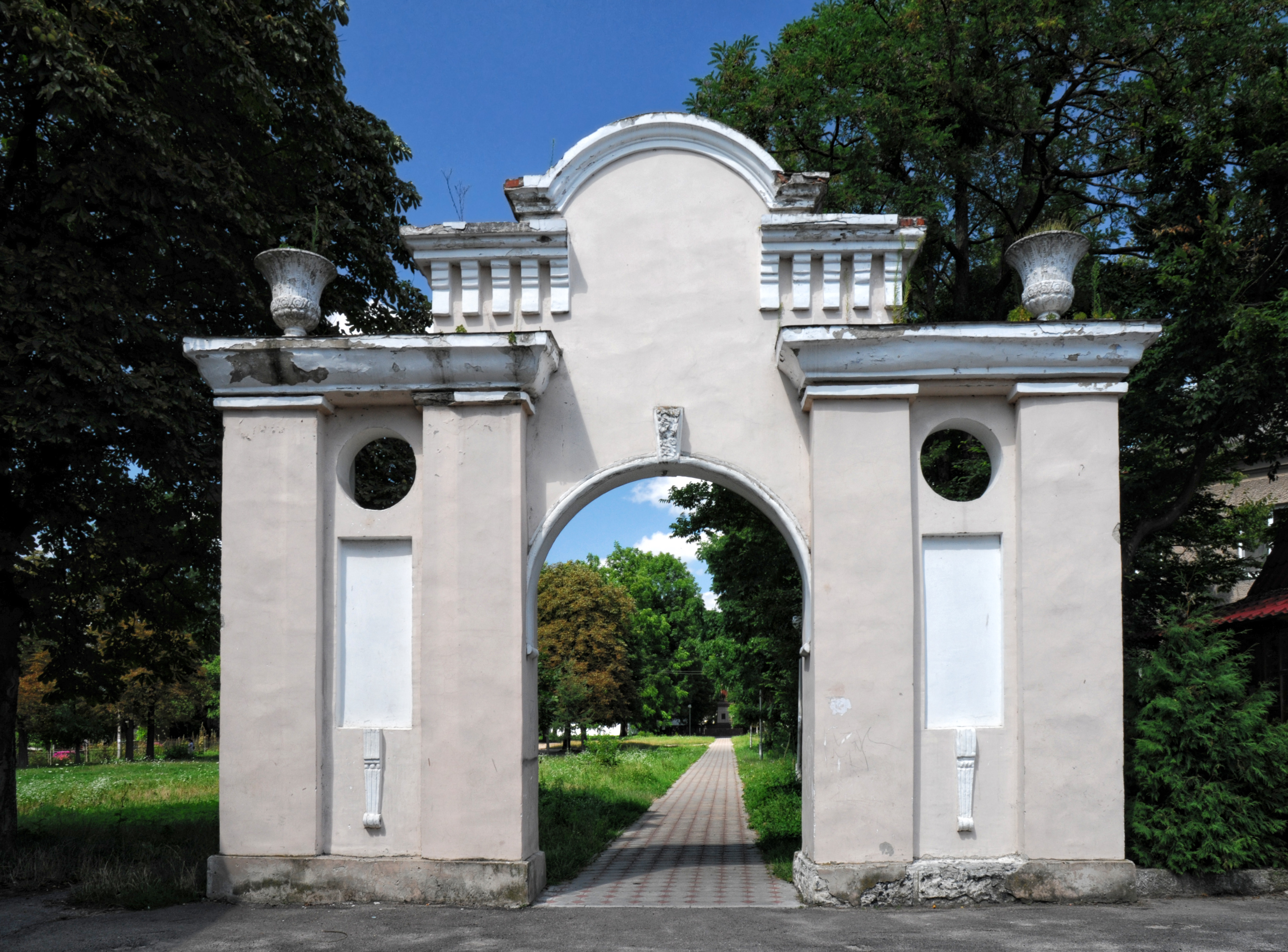
Park gate

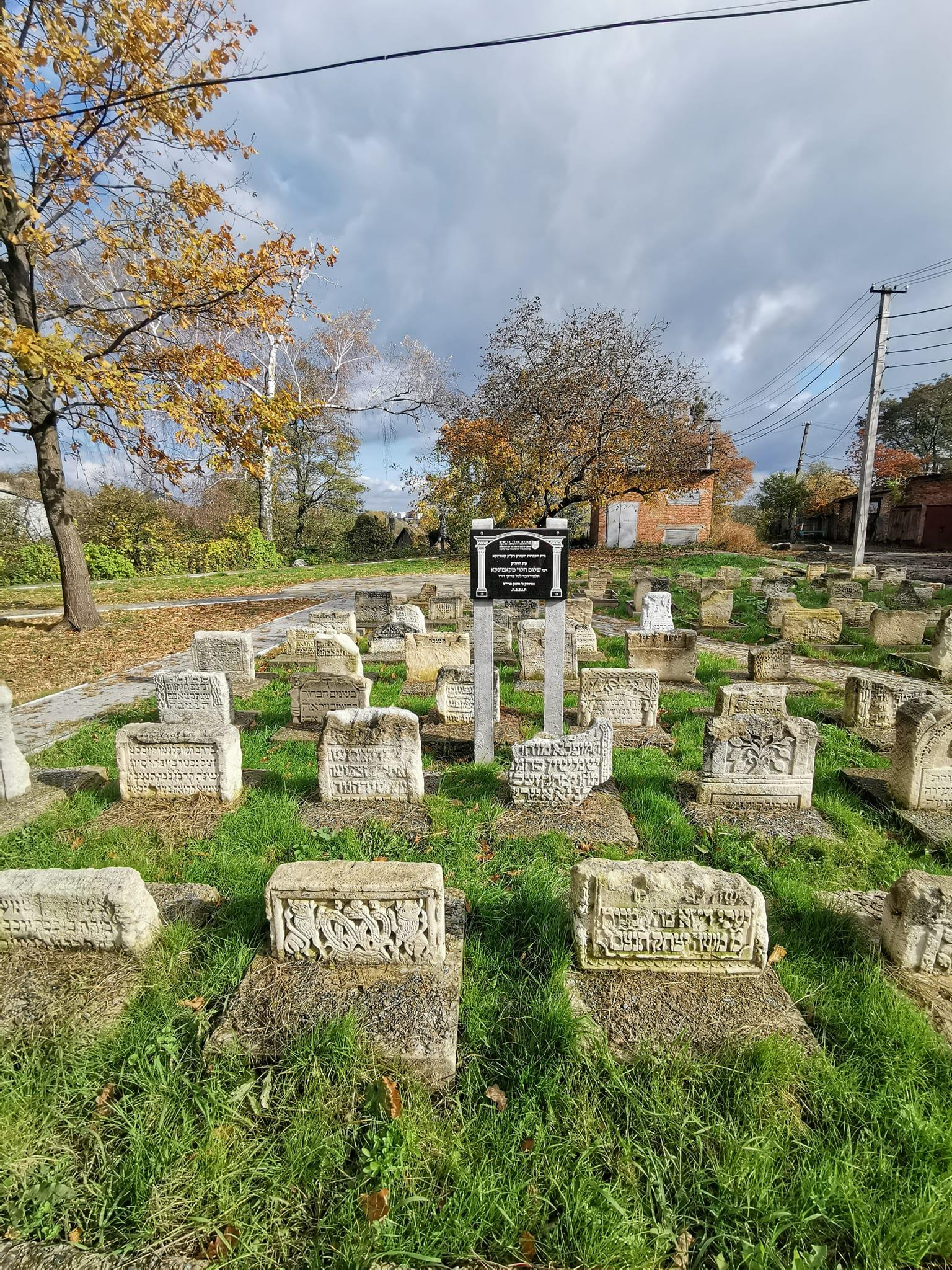
Old Jewish cemetery
