= Spasskoye (Rozhdestvenskoye Rural Settlement), Sobinsky District, Vladimir Oblast =

Spasskoye Спасское
- Selo
- Location within Vladimir Oblast Location within Russia
- Coordinates: 56°15′N 39°45′E
- Country: Russia
- Region: Vladimir Oblast
- District: Sobinsky District
- Time zone: UTC+3:00

Spasskoye (Russian: Спасское) is a rural locality (a selo) in Rozhdestvenskoye Rural Settlement, Sobinsky District, Vladimir Oblast, Russia. The population was 4 as of 2010.

== Geography ==
The village is located 17 km north-west from Rozhdestveno, 47 km north-west from Sobinka.
