= Kuznetsy =

Kuznetsy Кузнецы
- Village
- Location within Perm Krai Location within Russia
- Coordinates: 57°39′N 54°10′E
- Country: Russia
- Region: Perm Krai
- District: Bolshesosnovsky District
- Time zone: UTC+5:00

Kuznetsy (Russian: Кузнецы) is a rural locality (a village) in Petropavlovskoye Rural Settlement, Bolshesosnovsky District, Perm Krai, Russia. The population was 9 as of 2010. There is 1 street.

== Geography ==
Kuznetsy is located 28 km west of Bolshaya Sosnova (the district's administrative centre) by road. Permyaki is the nearest rural locality.
