= Spasskoye (Bereznikovskoye Rural Settlement), Sobinsky District, Vladimir Oblast =

Spasskoye Спасское
- Village
- Location within Vladimir Oblast Location within Russia
- Coordinates: 55°54′N 39°57′E
- Country: Russia
- Region: Vladimir Oblast
- District: Sobinsky District
- Time zone: UTC+3:00

Spasskoye (Russian: Спасское) is a rural locality (a village) in Bereznikovskoye Rural Settlement, Sobinsky District, Vladimir Oblast, Russia. The population was 21 in 2010.

== Geography ==
The village is located on the Klyazma River, 11 km north-west from Berezniki, 13 km south-west from Sobinka.
