= Spas, Debar =

Spas
- Village
- Спас
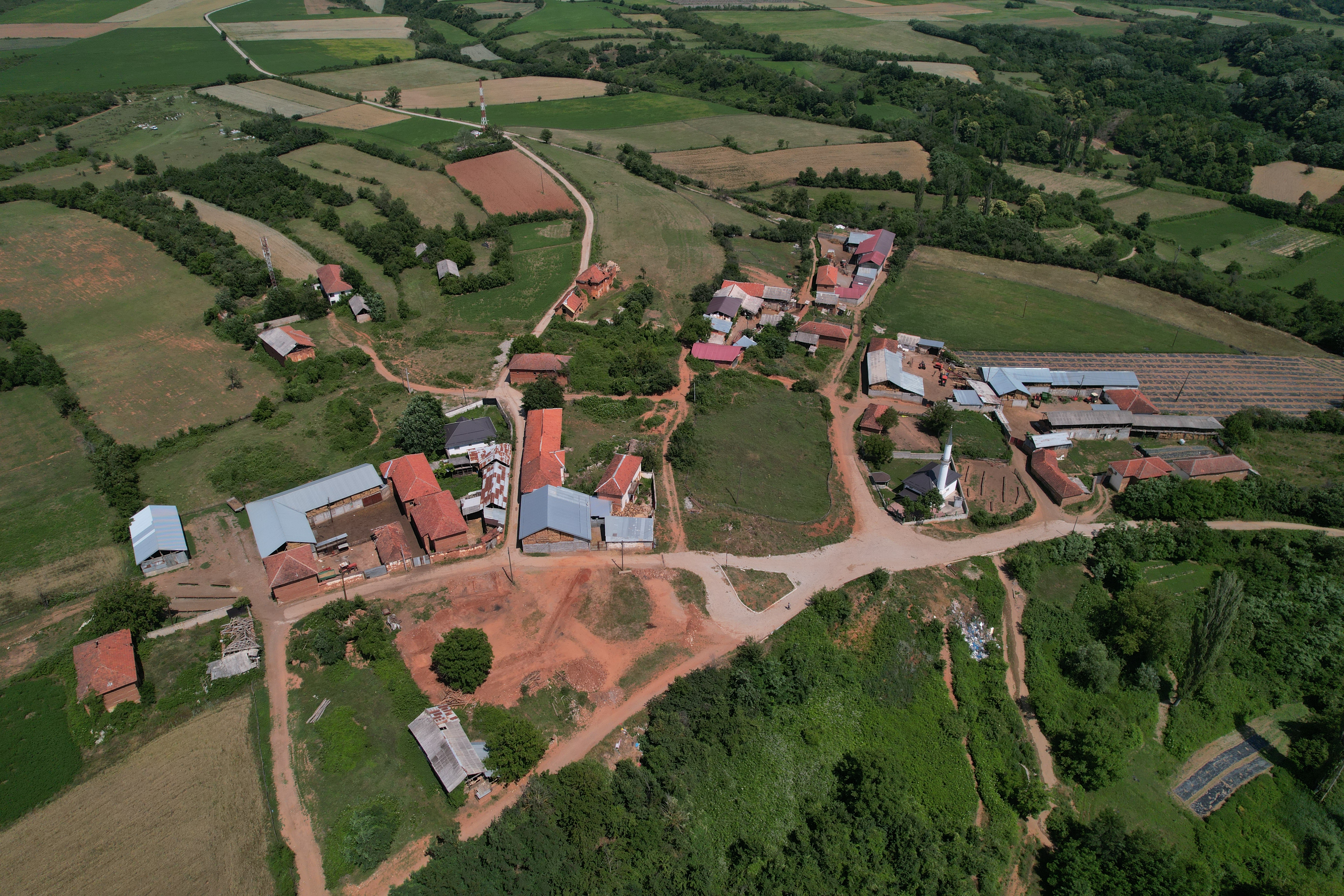
- Airview of the village

- Location within North Macedonia
- Coordinates: 41°33′N 20°29′E
- Country: North Macedonia
- Region: Southwestern
- Municipality: Debar

Population (201)
  - Total: 3
- Time zone: UTC+1 (CET)
  - Summer (DST): UTC+2 (CEST)
- Car plates: DB
- Website: .

Spas (Macedonian: Спас, Albanian: Spas) is a village in the municipality of Debar, North Macedonia.

== Demographics ==
As of the 2021 census, Spas had 3 residents with the following ethnic composition:

- Persons for whom data are taken from administrative sources 3

According to the 2002 census, the village had a total of 32 inhabitants. Ethnic groups in the village include:

- Albanians 32
