= Bestuzhevo, Altai Krai =

Bestuzhevo Бестужево
- Selo
- Location within Altai Krai Location within Russia
- Coordinates: 52°02′N 82°28′E
- Country: Russia
- Region: Altai Krai
- District: Shipunovsky District
- Time zone: UTC+7:00

Bestuzhevo (Russian: Бестужево) is a rural locality (a selo) in Ilyinsky Selsoviet, Shipunovsky District, Altai Krai, Russia. The population was 235 as of 2013. There are 9 streets.

== Geography ==
Bestuzhevo is located 33 km southeast of Shipunovo (the district's administrative centre) by road. Meteli is the nearest rural locality.
