= Spassk =

Spassk (Russian: Спасск) is the name of several inhabited localities in Russia.

== Modern localities ==
Urban localities

- Spassk, Penza Oblast, a town in Spassky District of Penza Oblast
- Spassk, Kemerovo Oblast, an urban-type settlement in Tashtagolsky District of Kemerovo Oblast; 52°45′N 87°46′E

Rural localities

- Spassk, Nizhny Novgorod Oblast, a village in Novoselsky Selsoviet of Vachsky District in Nizhny Novgorod Oblast
- Spassk, Novosibirsk Oblast, a village in Kupinsky District of Novosibirsk Oblast
- Spassk, Nazyvayevsky District, Omsk Oblast, a village in Utinsky Rural Okrug of Nazyvayevsky District in Omsk Oblast
- Spassk, Sedelnikovsky District, Omsk Oblast, a village in Saratovsky Rural Okrug of Sedelnikovsky District in Omsk Oblast
- Spassk, Ryazan Oblast, a village in Kermisinsky Rural Okrug of Shatsky District in Ryazan Oblast

== Alternative names ==
- Spassk, alternative name of Spasskoye, a selo in Spassky Selsoviet of Bolsheignatovsky District in the Republic of Mordovia; 55°7′N 45°40′E

== See also ==
- Spassk-Dalny, a town in Primorsky Krai
- Spassk-Ryazansky, a town in Ryazan Oblast
- Spas, Russia, several rural localities in Russia
- Spassky (disambiguation)

https://vk.com/club16367686
