= Spasskoye, Komsomolsky District, Ivanovo Oblast =

Spasskoye Спасское
- Village
- Location within Ivanovo Oblast Location within Russia
- Coordinates: 57°02′N 40°24′E
- Country: Russia
- Region: Ivanovo Oblast
- District: Komsomolsky District
- Time zone: UTC+3:00

Spasskoye (Russian: Спасское) is a rural locality (a village) in Komsomolsky District, Ivanovo Oblast, Russia. Population: 37 (2010 census);

== Geography ==
This rural locality is located 2 kilometres (1.2 mi) from Komsomolsk (the district's administrative centre), 35 kilometres (22 mi) from Ivanovo (capital of Ivanovo Oblast) and 221 kilometres (137 mi) from Moscow. Komsomolsk is the nearest rural locality.
