= Spassky District, Nizhny Novgorod Oblast =

Spassky District Спасский район (Russian)
- District
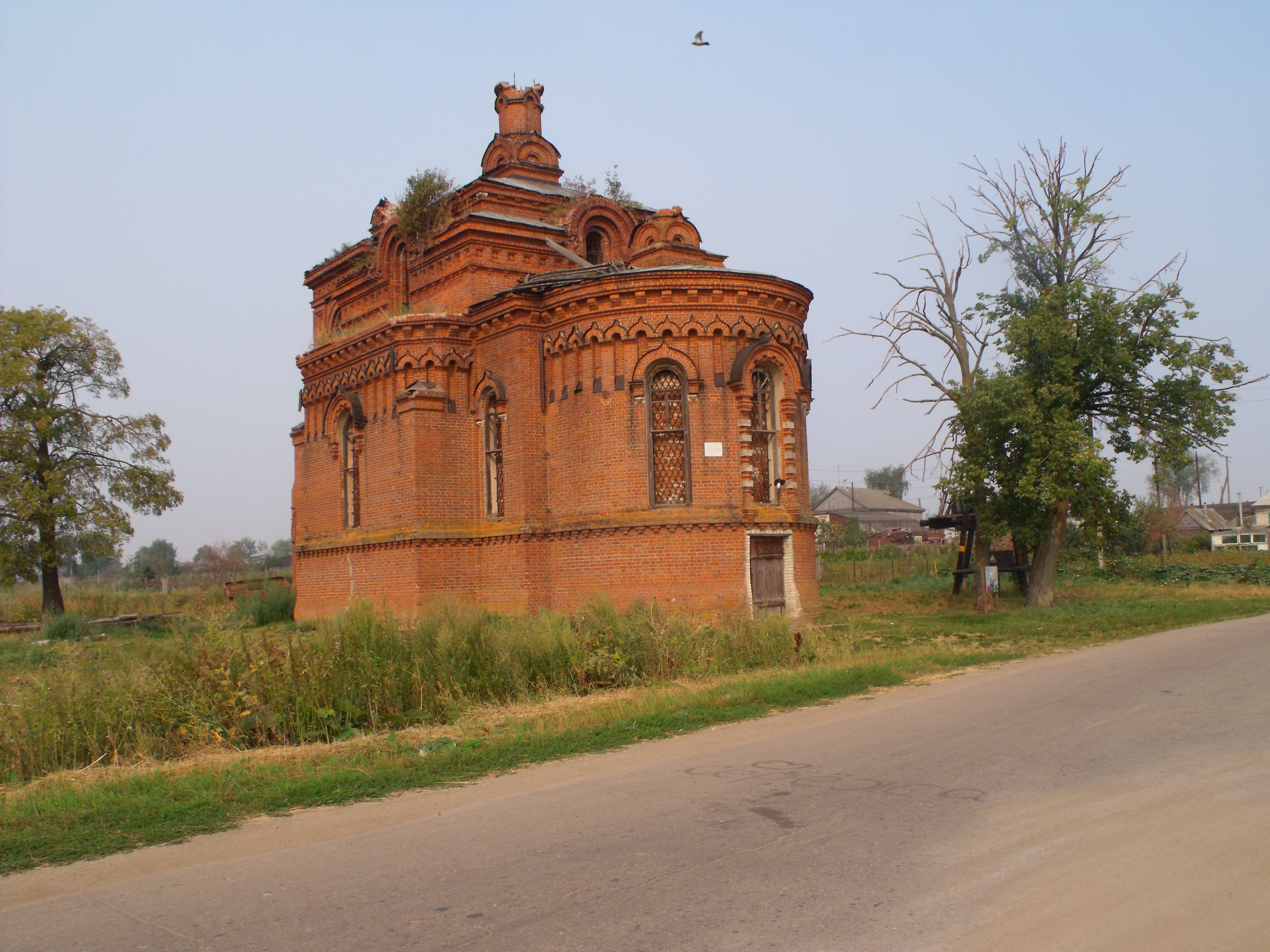
- Church building in Spassky District

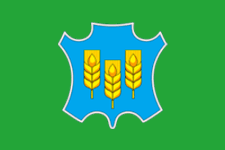
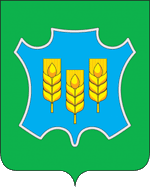
- Flag Coat of arms
- Location of Spassky District in Nizhny Novgorod Oblast
- Coordinates: 56°49′34″N 43°56′31″E
- Country: Russia
- Federal subject: Nizhny Novgorod Oblast
- Established: 1929
- Administrative center: Spasskoye

Area
  - Total: 706.6 km^{2} (272.8 sq mi)

Population (2010 Census)
  - Total: 10,998
  - Density: 15.56/km^{2} (40.31/sq mi)
  - Urban: 0%
  - Rural: 100%

Administrative structure
  - Administrative divisions: 7 Selsoviets
  - Inhabited localities: 44 rural localities

Municipal structure
  - Municipally incorporated as: Spassky Municipal District
  - Municipal divisions: 0 urban settlements, 7 rural settlements
- Time zone: UTC+3 (MSK)
- OKTMO ID: 22651000
- Website: http://spasskoe.omsu-nnov.ru

Spassky District (Russian: Спа́сский райо́н) is an administrative district (raion), one of the forty in Nizhny Novgorod Oblast, Russia. Municipally, it is incorporated as Spassky Municipal District. It is located in the east of the oblast. The area of the district is 706.6 square kilometers (272.8 sq mi). Its administrative center is the rural locality (a selo) of Spasskoye. Population: 10,998 (2010 Census); 13,533 (2002 census); 16,204 (1989 Soviet census). The population of Spasskoye accounts for 35.9% of the district's total population.

== History ==
The district was established in 1929.
