= Spasskoye, Yuryev-Polsky District, Vladimir Oblast =

Spasskoye Спасское
- Selo
- Location within Vladimir Oblast Location within Russia
- Coordinates: 56°37′N 39°29′E
- Country: Russia
- Region: Vladimir Oblast
- District: Yuryev-Polsky District
- Time zone: UTC+3:00

Spasskoye (Russian: Спасское) is a rural locality (a selo) in Simskoye Rural Settlement, Yuryev-Polsky District, Vladimir Oblast, Russia. The population was 300 as of 2010. There are 3 streets.

== Geography ==
Spasskoye is located 34 km northwest of Yuryev-Polsky (the district's administrative centre) by road. Dobrynskoye is the nearest rural locality.
