= Spasskoye, Ustyuzhensky District, Vologda Oblast =

Spasskoye Спасское
- Settlement
- Location within Vologda Oblast Location within Russia
- Coordinates: 58°41′N 36°20′E
- Country: Russia
- Region: Vologda Oblast
- District: Ustyuzhensky District
- Time zone: UTC+3:00

Spasskoye (Russian: Спасское) is a rural locality (a settlement) in Nikiforovskoye Rural Settlement, Ustyuzhensky District, Vologda Oblast, Russia. The population was 248 as of 2002. There are 8 streets.

== Geography ==
Spasskoye is located 27 km (17 mi) south of Ustyuzhna (the district's administrative centre) by road. Leushino is the nearest rural locality.
