= Spasskoye, Sterlitamaksky District, Republic of Bashkortostan =

Spasskoye Спасское
- Village
- Location within Bashkortostan Location within Russia
- Coordinates: 53°49′N 56°02′E
- Country: Russia
- Region: Bashkortostan
- District: Sterlitamaksky District
- Time zone: UTC+5:00

Spasskoye (Russian: Спасское) is a rural locality (a village) in Podlesnensky Selsoviet, Sterlitamaksky District, Bashkortostan, Russia. The population was 16 as of 2010. There is 1 street.

== Geography ==
Spasskoye is located 31 km north of Sterlitamak (the district's administrative centre) by road. Talalayevka is the nearest rural locality.
