= Spasskoye, Gryazovetsky District, Vologda Oblast =

Spasskoye Спасское
- Village
- Location within Vologda Oblast Location within Russia
- Coordinates: 58°55′N 40°45′E
- Country: Russia
- Region: Vologda Oblast
- District: Gryazovetsky District
- Time zone: UTC+3:00

Spasskoye (Russian: Спасское) is a rural locality (a village) in Sidorovskoye Rural Settlement, Gryazovetsky District, Vologda Oblast, Russia. The population was 326 as of 2002.

== Geography ==
Spasskoye is located 37 km east of Gryazovets (the district's administrative centre) by road. Lezha is the nearest rural locality.
