= Spasskoye, Vologodsky District, Vologda Oblast =

Spasskoye Спасское
- Selo
- Location within Vologda Oblast Location within Russia
- Coordinates: 59°08′N 39°50′E
- Country: Russia
- Region: Vologda Oblast
- District: Vologodsky District
- Time zone: UTC+3:00

Spasskoye (Russian: Спасское) is a rural locality (a selo) in Spasskoye Rural Settlement, Vologodsky District, Vologda Oblast, Russia. The population was 17 as of 2002. There are 6 streets.

== Geography ==
Spasskoye is located 13 km southwest of Vologda (the district's administrative centre) by road. Kudrino is the nearest rural locality.
