= Spasskoye, Spassky District, Nizhny Novgorod Oblast =

Rural locality in Nizhny Novgorod Oblast, Russia

Coordinates: 56°49′03″N 43°58′04″E

Spasskoye (Russian: Спа́сское) is a rural locality (a selo) and the administrative center of Spassky District, Nizhny Novgorod Oblast, Russia. Population: 3,947 (2010 census); 4,092 (2002 census); 4,044 (1989 Soviet census).
