= Spasskoye, Iglinsky District, Republic of Bashkortostan =

Spasskoye Спасское
- Village
- Location within Bashkortostan Location within Russia
- Coordinates: 54°56′N 56°40′E
- Country: Russia
- Region: Bashkortostan
- District: Iglinsky District
- Time zone: UTC+5:00

Spasskoye (Russian: Спасское) is a rural locality (a village) in Tavtimanovsky Selsoviet, Iglinsky District, Bashkortostan, Russia. The population was 11 as of 2010.

== Geography ==
Spasskoye is located 24 km northeast of Iglino (the district's administrative centre) by road. Pokrovka is the nearest rural locality.
