= Spassky =

Spassky (masculine) or Spasskaya (feminine) is a common Russian surname, usually of descendants of Russian Orthodox clergymen. The neuter form is Spasskoye. The term may refer to:

People

- Boris Spassky (1937–2025), Soviet chess player and world champion
- Igor Spassky (1926–2024), Russian scientist, engineer, and entrepreneur

Places

- Spassky District, name of several districts in Russia
- Spassky (rural locality) (Spasskaya, Spasskoye), name of several rural localities in Russia

Other

- Spasskaya Tower, a tower of the Moscow Kremlin
