= Novospassky District =

Novospassky District Новоспасский район (Russian)
- District
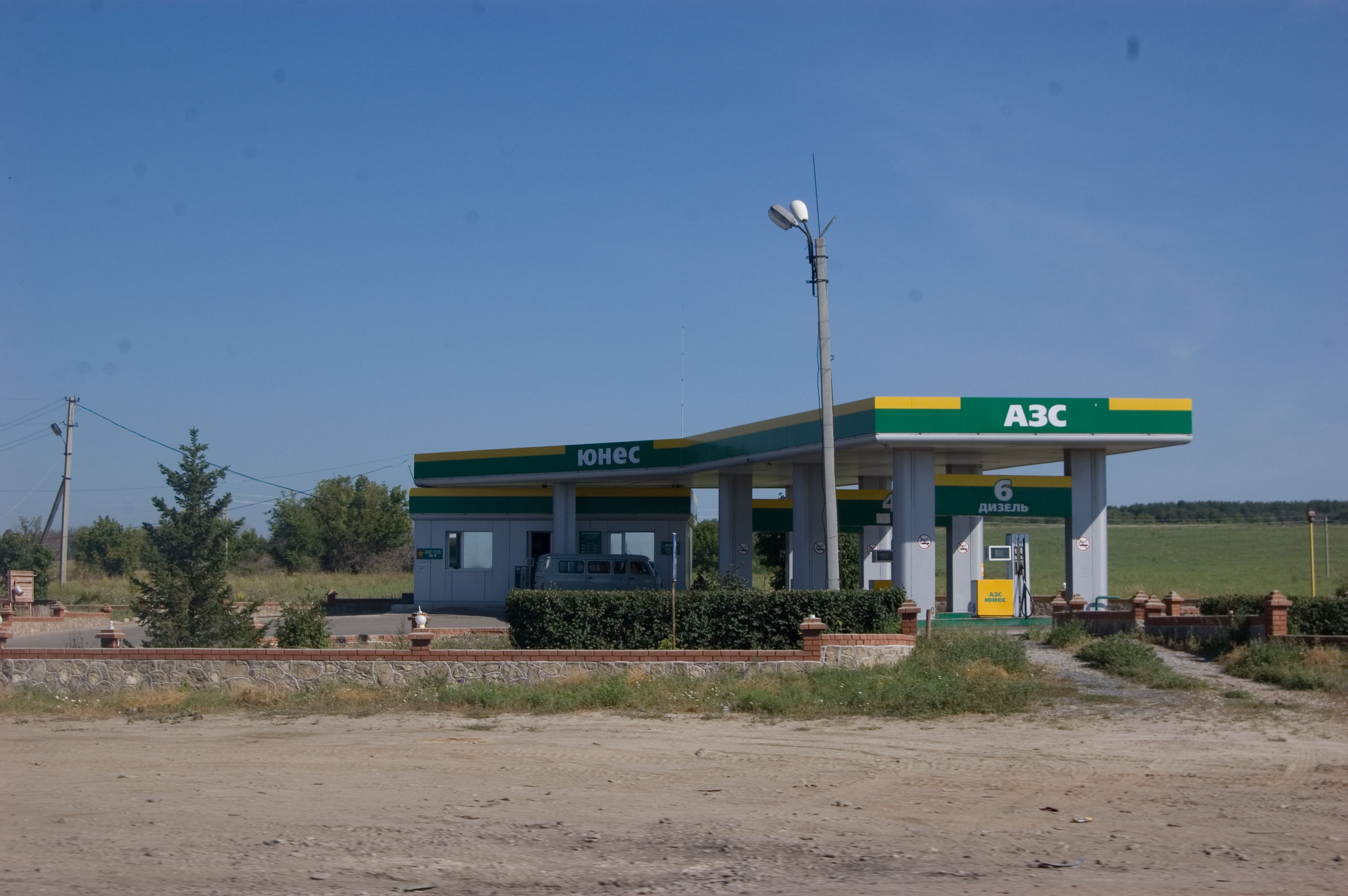
- Service station, Novospassky District

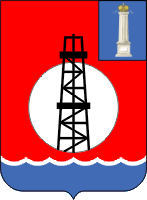
- Flag Coat of arms
- Location of Novospassky District in Ulyanovsk Oblast
- Coordinates: 53°08′45″N 47°45′30″E
- Country: Russia
- Federal subject: Ulyanovsk Oblast
- Administrative center: Novospasskoye

Area
  - Total: 1,301.1 km^{2} (502.4 sq mi)

Population (2010 Census)
  - Total: 22,478
  - Density: 17.276/km^{2} (44.745/sq mi)
  - Urban: 49.3%
  - Rural: 50.7%

Administrative structure
  - Administrative divisions: 1 Settlement okrugs, 5 Rural okrugs
  - Inhabited localities: 1 urban-type settlements, 41 rural localities

Municipal structure
  - Municipally incorporated as: Novospassky Municipal District
  - Municipal divisions: 1 urban settlements, 5 rural settlements
- Time zone: UTC+4 (UTC+04:00)
- OKTMO ID: 73629000
- Website: http://novospasskoe.ulregion.ru/

Novospassky District (Russian: Новоспа́сский райо́н) is an administrative and municipal district (raion), one of the twenty-one in Ulyanovsk Oblast, Russia. It is located in the south of the oblast. The area of the district is 1,301.1 square kilometers (502.4 sq mi). Its administrative center is the urban locality (a work settlement) of Novospasskoye. Population: 22,478 (2010 Census); 23,852 (2002 census); 22,734 (1989 Soviet census). The population of Novospasskoye accounts for 49.3% of the district's total population.
