= List of rural localities in Mordovia =

Map of Russia with Mordovia highlighted

This is a list of rural localities in the Republic of Mordovia. The Republic of Mordovia (Russian: Респу́блика Мордо́вия, romanized: Respublika Mordoviya, IPA: [rʲɪsˈpublʲɪkə mɐrˈdovʲɪjə]; Moksha/Erzya: Мордовия Республикась, Mordovija Respublikaś) is a federal subject of Russia (a republic). Its capital is the city of Saransk. As of the 2010 Census, the population of the republic was 834,755. Ethnic Russians (53.4%) and Mordvins (40.0%) account for the majority of the population.

== Atyashevsky District ==
Rural localities in Atyashevsky District:

- Chebudasy

== Atyuryevsky District ==
Rural localities in Atyuryevsky District:

- Atyuryevo

== Bolshebereznikovsky District ==
Rural localities in Bolshebereznikovsky District:

- Bolshiye Berezniki
- Degilyovka
- Nerley
- Permisi

== Bolsheignatovsky District ==
Rural localities in Bolsheignatovsky District:

- Bolshoye Ignatovo

== Chamzinsky District ==
Rural localities in Chamzinsky District:

- Sorliney

== Dubyonsky District ==
Rural localities in Dubyonsky District:

- Dubyonki
- Povodimovo

== Ichalkovsky District ==
Rural localities in Ichalkovsky District:

- Kemlya

== Kochkurovsky District ==
Rural localities in Kochkurovsky District:

- Kochkurovo
- Maly Umys
- Podlesnaya Tavla

== Kovylkinsky District ==
Rural localities in Kovylkinsky District:

- Budy
- Kirlyay
- Ryskino
- Shadym
- Tokmovo

== Lyambirsky District ==
Rural localities in Lyambirsky District:

- Atemar
- Bolotnikovo
- Lyambir

== Romodanovsky District ==
Rural localities in Romodanovsky District:

- Romodanovo

== Ruzayevsky District ==
Rural localities in Ruzayevsky District:

- Krasny Ugolok

== Saransk ==
Rural localities in Saransk urban okrug:

- Makarovka

== Staroshaygovsky District ==
Rural localities in Staroshaygovsky District:

- Avgury
- Staroye Shaygovo

== Tengushevsky District ==
Rural localities in Tengushevsky District:

- Khlebino
- Tengushevo

== Temnikovsky District ==
Rural localities in Temnikovsky District:

- Babeyevo

== Torbeyevsky District ==
Rural localities in Torbeyevsky District:

- Drakino
- Mazilug
- Vindrey

== See also ==
- Lists of rural localities in Russia
