= Avgury (inhabited locality) =

Avgury (Russian: Авгуры) is the name of several rural localities in Russia.

== Modern localities ==
- Avgury, Mordovia, a village in Novofedorovsky Selsoviet of Staroshaygovsky District in the Republic of Mordovia, Russia

== Alternative names ==
- Avgury, alternative name of Mordovskaya Avgura, a village in Chekashevo-Polyansky Selsoviet of Kovylkinsky District in the Republic of Mordovia; 54°9′N 44°13′E
