= Saransky Uyezd =

Saransky Uyezd (Саранский уезд) was one of the subdivisions of the Penza Governorate of the Russian Empire. It was situated in the eastern part of the governorate. Its administrative centre was Saransk. In terms of present-day administrative borders, the territory of Saransky Uyezd is divided between the Bolshebereznikovsky, Chamzinsky, Ichalkovsky, Kochkurovsky, Lyambirsky, Romodanovsky and Ruzayevsky districts and the city of Saransk of Mordovia and Luninsky District of Penza Oblast.

== Demographics ==
At the time of the Russian Empire Census of 1897, Saransky Uyezd had a population of 143,130. Of these, 74.1% spoke Russian, 17.9% Mordvin, and 7.9% Tatar as their native language.
