= Sergey Akhromeyev =

Soviet marshal (1923–1991)

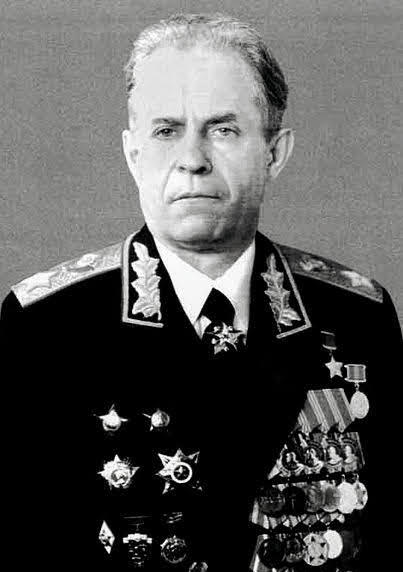
- Akhromeyev c. 1980s
- Born: May 5, 1923; Vindrey village, Torbeyevsky District, Mordovia, Russian SFSR, Soviet Union
- Died: August 24, 1991 (aged 68); Moscow, Russian SFSR, Soviet Union
- Cause of death: Suicide by hanging (official); Murder (theorized)
- Burial place: Troyekurovskoye Cemetery
- Military career
- Allegiance: Soviet Union
- Branch: Soviet Army
- Service years: 1942–1991
- Rank: Marshal of the Soviet Union (1983–1991)
- Commands: Rifle Platoon: 197th Army Reserve Regiment; Motorized Battalion: 14th Self-Propelled Artillery Brigade; Tank Battalion: Eastern Front; 14th Separate Tank Regiment; 14th Heavy Tank-Self-Propelled Regiment; Tank Regiments: Far Eastern Military District; 36th Tank Division; Tank Training Division; 7th Tank Army; Soviet General Staff
- Conflicts: World War II; Soviet–Afghan War
- Awards: Hero of the Soviet Union

Sergey Fyodorovich Akhromeyev (Russian: Серге́й Фёдорович Ахроме́ев; May 5, 1923 – August 24, 1991) was a Soviet military figure, Hero of the Soviet Union (1982) and Marshal of the Soviet Union (1983).

When he was the first deputy chief of staff of the Soviet Army, he formulated a military plan to invade Afghanistan. He later served as Chief of the General Staff of the Soviet Armed Forces from 1984 to 1988 and as chief military adviser to General Secretary of the Communist Party of the Soviet Union Mikhail Gorbachev. A member of the State Committee on the State of Emergency during the 1991 Soviet coup attempt, Akhromeyev died by suicide after the failure of the coup.

== Early life ==
Sergey Akhromeyev was born on 5 May in 1923 in Vindrey, a village in the Tambov Governorate of the Russian SFSR (now Mordovia), in a family of Russian ethnicity. His father fell under dispossession and died in the late 1940s in Central Asia. His mother, after divorcing her husband in 1928, left with her children to Moscow, where she worked at the plant in Krasny Bogatyr.

== Career ==
=== World War II ===
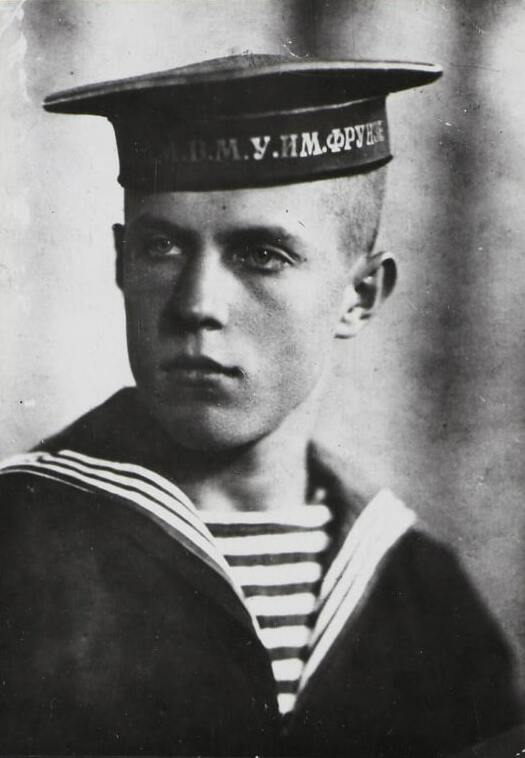
Akhromeyev as a cadet in Naval School

In 1940, he graduated from the 1st Special Naval School in Moscow and in the same year began military service, enrolling in the M. V. Frunze Higher Naval School. He took additional training at the naval base of the Baltic Fleet in Liepāja, in recently Soviet-occupied Latvia. Akhromeyev was a Naval Infantry junior officer on the Eastern Front, serving with distinction during the Siege of Leningrad, and was wounded and suffered frostbite. He continued his studies at the M. V. Frunze Higher Naval School.

Enrolled in August 1942 as a cadet in the courses of lieutenants at the 2nd Astrakhan Infantry School, which he graduated in the same year. From May to August 1942 he was a cadet with the Black Sea Fleet, serving as part of the gunnery unit on the ship. He then served as commander of a rifle platoon of the 197th Army Reserve Regiment of the 28th Army, and since 1943 as an adjutant senior rifle battalion of the same regiment on the 4th Ukrainian Front.

At one point he was ordered to guard and hold a road on which the German Army would be trying to advance. Despite a bloody battle, he was able to accomplish the task. Relating the story during a meal with Secretary of State George Shultz and Ambassador Kenneth Adelman in Reykjavík during the Reagan Administration, Akhromeyev told Shultz that his accomplishment was not only a great sign of his patriotism, as Shultz suggested, but also was because had he abandoned the road, Stalin would have had him shot. He was decorated for his participation in the defense of Leningrad.

From July 1944, he was commander of a motorized battalion of machine gunners of the 14th Self-Propelled Artillery Brigade of the Reserve of the High Command in the Kharkov and Moscow Military Districts. On 1945, he graduated from the Higher Officers' School of Self-Propelled Artillery of the Armored and Mechanized Forces of the Red Army.

Akhromeyev recalled his war experiences:

"A total of 18 months, I have never been in a house, even when the temperature is as low as minus 50 degrees celsius. I have been sleeping outside in two winters, and I have never had a warm day. Always fighting, always starving. Moreover, there are so many dead. 8 out of 10 boys of my age are dead. Of my 32 middle school classmates, only one of my classmates and I survived."

When the war ended in 1945, he was the commander of a tank battalion.

=== Post-war service ===
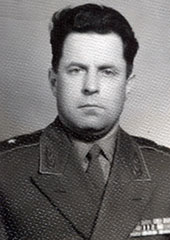
Major General Akhromeyev (1965)

After the war, from June 1945 to September 1945, he was deputy commander of the SU-76 Self-Propelled Artillery Battalion. From September 1945 to February 1947, he commanded a tank battalion of the 14th Separate Tank Regiment of the training center. From February 1947, commander of the ISU-122 battalion of the 14th Heavy Tank-Self-Propelled Regiment of the 31st Guards Mechanised Division in the Baku Military District in Azerbaijan SSR.

In 1952 he graduated from the IV Stalin Military Academy of Armored and Mechanized Forces of the Soviet Army. From July 1952, he was the chief of staff of the 190th Tank-Self-Propelled Regiment in the 39th Army of the Primorsky Military District. In August 1955, he commanded tank regiments in the Far Eastern Military District. From December 1957 to December 1960, he served as deputy commander, chief of staff, and commander of the 36th Tank Division in the Belarusian Military District. From April 1964, he served as commander of a training tank division.

From October 1968 to May 1972, he served as commander of the 7th Tank Army in the Belarusian Military District. From May 1972 to March 1974, Akhromeyev served as Chief of Staff and First Deputy Commander of the Far Eastern Military District. In 1973, he graduated from the Higher Academic Courses at the Voroshilov Military Academy of the General Staff of the USSR Armed Forces.

From March 1974 to February 1979, he was the Chief of the Main Operations Directorate (GOU) of the General Staff of the USSR Armed Forces and Deputy Chief of the General Staff of the USSR Armed Forces. From 1974 to 1986, he was also Secretary of the Council of Defence.

=== Soviet-Afghan War ===
The army headquarters in Kabul often gathered military leaders for various meetings. By the way, Marshal Akhromeyev was then Deputy Chief of the General Staff, every day, without holidays and weekends, he was at these meetings at five in the morning.

— BI Tkach

In 1979, while serving as the First Deputy Chief of the General Staff of the Armed Forces of the USSR, Akhromeyev formulated a comprehensive plan to invade Afghanistan. This plan was successful, and the Hafizullah Amin regime in Afghanistan immediately fell. Akhromeyev believed that after the occupation of Afghanistan, the Soviet Army should advance on victory and occupy the western part of Pakistan in one go so that the Soviet Union could obtain an outlet to the Indian Ocean and to eradicate the logistics base of the Afghan Mujahideen.

The young Soviet generals advocated for the invasion of Afghanistan. Marshals Vasily Chuikov, Kirill Moskalenko and others held this view. During his time as deputy chief of staff, he almost gave up all rest time and devoted himself to work.

=== Chief of the General Staff and retirement ===
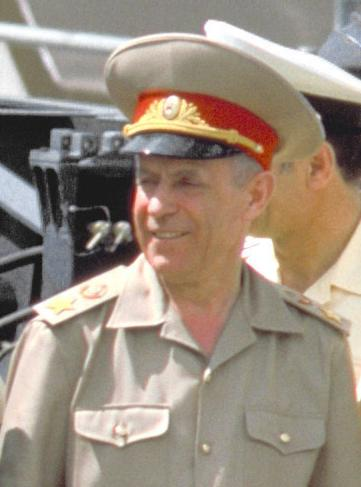
Akhromeyev (1988)

In 1980, he was awarded the Lenin Prize for his research into the use of automated systems in the Armed Forces. Akhromeyev was promoted to Marshal of the Soviet Union in 1983. Between 1984 and 1989, he served as Chief of the General Staff of the Soviet Armed Forces. In that capacity, Akhromeyev was heavily involved in the talks which brought an end to the Cold War. He grew increasingly dissatisfied with Mikhail Gorbachev's approach to reforming the military, in particular, his insistence on dismantling the newest and most accurate ballistic missile in the Soviet Army — the SS-23 Spider — under the tenets of the Intermediate-Range Nuclear Forces Treaty, and resigned from that position.

Following his retirement from the armed forces, he served as the Deputy of the Soviet of the Union of the Supreme Soviet of the USSR from the Moldavian SSR on 1984. From December 1988, he served as an advisor to the General Secretary of the Communist Party of the Soviet Union. During the Chernobyl Disaster of 1986, Akhromeyev was involved in the organization and deployment of troops to the location of the catastrophe. The Soviet Armed Forces personnel carried out radiation monitoring, decontamination of the terrain, sheltering contaminated wastes and participated in the burial of the emergency block. He later presented a report on the conduct of the troops during the disaster.

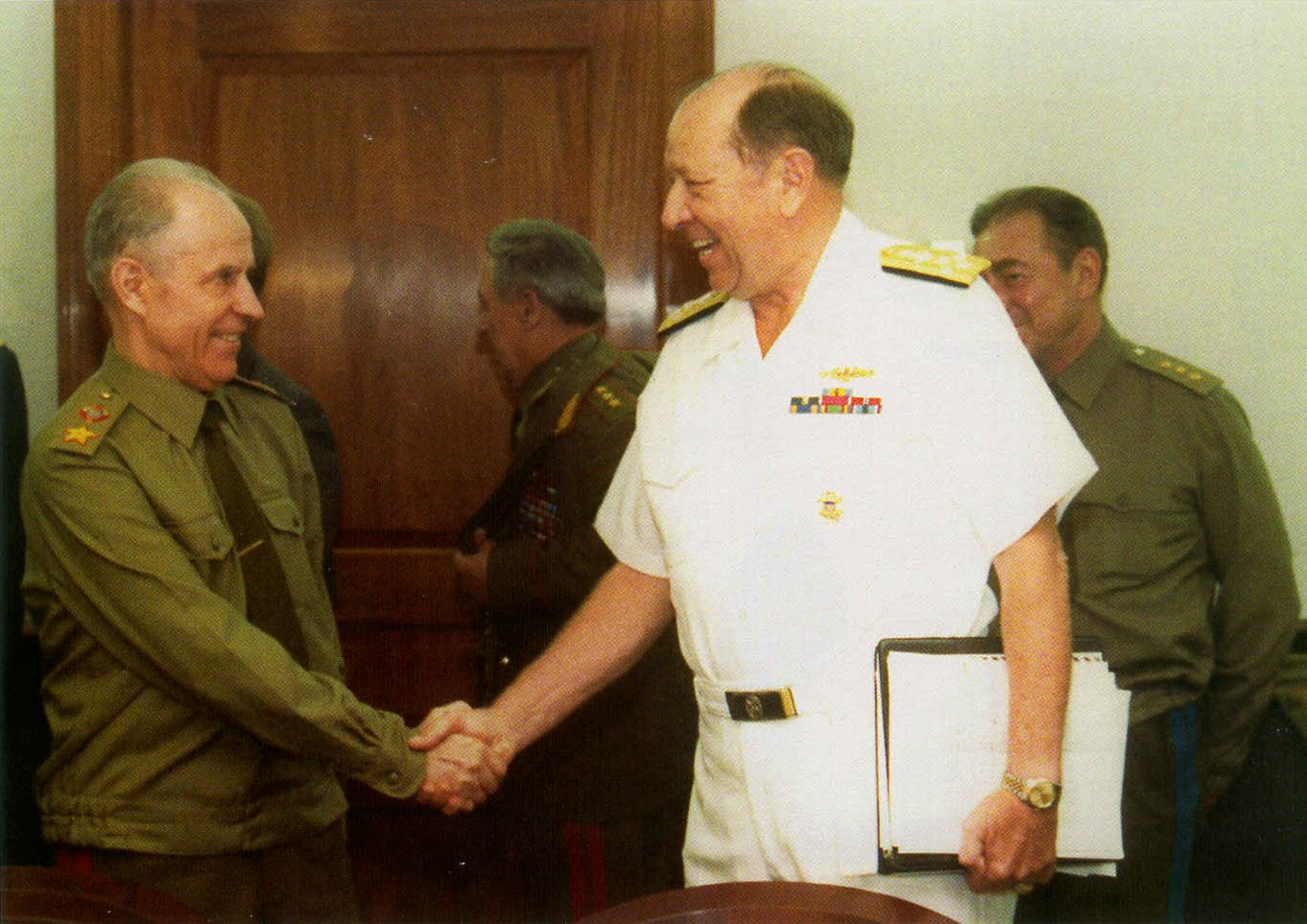
Chairman of Joint Chiefs of Staff Admiral William J. Crowe (right) welcomes Akhromeyev, at the JCS Conference Room in the Pentagon (1988)

From May 1989, he served as an advisor to the chairman of the Supreme Soviet of the USSR, Mikhail Gorbachev. In March 1989, he was elected People's Deputy of the USSR from the Bălți Territorial District No. 697 of Moldavian SSR. Akhromeyev served as the member of the Supreme Soviet of the USSR, the Committee of the USSR Armed Forces on Defense and Security. During the meetings at the Congress of People's Deputies and the Supreme Soviet of the USSR, he repeatedly spoke as well as in the press with articles about the "danger of a quick conquest of the USSR by NATO".

From December 1988, he served as the Inspector General of the Group of Inspectors General of the Ministry of Defense of the Soviet Union. In March 1990, he was made advisor to the President of the USSR on military affairs. He resigned from all positions in 1991. On November 14, in an interview with the conservative Soviet magazine, he stated that in case of internal division within the USSR, there is a possibility that the military will be dispatched to prevent the country's disintegration. He stated:

"I openly state my position. I support the socialist way of life. If someone attempts to split the country or change its social system by force or other unconstitutional acts, the president and the Soviets can decide to use force to ensure the protection of our motherland. Unify and maintain its constitutional social system."

His comments attracted attention. On June 19, 1991, at a press conference commemorating the 50th anniversary of the Great Patriotic War, Akhromeyev observed that the situation of the Soviet Union in 1991 was similar to that of 1941. He believed that the country was heading for its destruction, going so far as to say that "which was defended by Soviet soldiers and civilians at the expense of millions of people, is about to collapse".

According to Russian political writer Roy Medvedev:

"Marshal Akhromeyev was a worthy military leader and was highly respected in the army and in the party. The Marshal was discouraged by the behavior of the President of the USSR, who stopped giving his adviser and assistant any assignments and constantly postponed the decision a number of important military problems that Akhromeyev considered urgent. In the end, Akhromeyev submitted his resignation letter back in June 1991, but Gorbachev was also slow to resolve this issue."

== Involvement in the August Coup and death ==
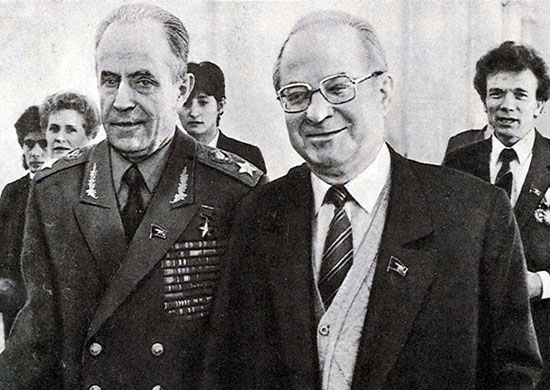
Akhromeyev (left) with Soviet diplomat Georgy Korniyenko (1985)

During the August Coup of 1991, Akhromeyev returned from Sochi, where he was on vacation with his wife Tamara Vasilievna and grandchildren, and met with the Vice President of the Soviet Union Gennady Yanayev, to offer his assistance to the coup leaders. On August 20, he worked in the Kremlin and in the building of the Ministry of Defense. Akhromeyev prepared a plan of measures to be taken in connection with the introduction of the state of emergency. On the night of August 20–21, he spent the night in his office in the Kremlin. From his office, he called his daughters and wife in Sochi.

On August 20, Akhromeyev and Grigory Baklanov gathered a working group and organized the collection of information and analysis of the situation. On August 21, according to Akhromeyev, two reports prepared by this group were considered at a meeting of the Emergency Committee. In addition, Akhromeyev prepared a draft text for Yanayev for his planned report at the Presidium of the USSR Supreme Soviet. However, Yanayev did not like the text prepared by Akhromeyev. On August 22, he sent a personal letter to Gorbachev, where he declared his support of the coup and urged Gorbachev to take action to prevent the dissolution of USSR. On August 23, he attended a meeting of the USSR Supreme Soviet Committee for Defense and State Security. He was, among others, author of the planned assault on the White House. The defeat of the coup heralded the imminent end of his political career.

After its failure, Akhromeyev died by suicide. Shortly after his death, there was speculation that the suicide and suicide note were fake and that he was in fact murdered. Among other things, there was speculation as to why he did not shoot himself with his service weapon. There have also been rumors that he has been murdered to prevent him from revealing the partnership of others in a coup attempt. Army general Valentin Varennikov expressed doubts about the suicides of Akhromeyev and Boris Pugo. In addition to personal messages to his family, he left a note explaining that he could not continue living when the institutions to which he had devoted his life were disintegrating.

Akhromeyev was buried at the Troyekurovskoye Cemetery in Moscow. Shortly after his burial, his grave was vandalized and his corpse stripped of the decorations on the uniform, in which he had been buried. The culprits were never found, and it is uncertain whether it was an act of pure desecration or if the grave-robbers hoped to sell the stolen uniform or its adornments for profit. The decorations were never recovered. As a result, a few days later a second funeral and reburial was conducted for him in the same cemetery. His tombstone is engraved with the coat of arms of the USSR and the words; 'communist', 'patriot' and 'soldier'. Admiral William Crowe, former Chairman of the Joint Chiefs of Staff and later the United States Ambassador to the United Kingdom knew Marshal Akhromeyev and once called him a communist, a patriot, and a friend in that order.

According to Marshal Dmitry Yazov:

"But as for Akhromeyev, everything is literally in the case. And all the notes, and this ribbon on which he hanged himself. And a note about the first time the ribbon broke.. I'm sure that Akhromeyev laid hands on himself. I knew Sergey Fyodorovich well. He could not come to terms with what happened to his country."

== Legacy ==
Akhromeyev's memoirs were released posthumously in 1992. In 2015, Russian authorities unveiled a memorial plaque honoring him on the wall of house number 11, building 4 on Mosfilmovskaya Street in Moscow, where Akhromeyev lived from 1978 to 1991.

== Personal life ==
Akhromeyev was married to Tamara Vasilievna Akhromeyeva. They had two daughters, Tatiana and Natalia.

== Honours and awards ==
Soviet awards

- Hero of the Soviet Union (7 May 1982)
- Four Orders of Lenin (23 February 1971, 21 February 1978, 28 April 1980, 7 May 1982)
- Order of the October Revolution (1 July 1988)
- Order of the Red Star, twice (15 September 1943, 30 December 1956)
- Order of the Patriotic War, 1st class (6 April 1985)
- Order for Service to the Homeland in the Armed Forces of the USSR, 3rd class (30 April 1975)
- Lenin Prize (1980)
- Medal "For Battle Merit" (15 November 1945)
- Medal "For Distinction in Guarding the State Border of the USSR"
- Medal "For the Defence of Stalingrad" (1942)
- Medal "For the Defence of Leningrad" (1942)
- Medal "For the Victory over Germany in the Great Patriotic War 1941–1945" (1945)
- Jubilee Medal "Twenty Years of Victory in the Great Patriotic War 1941-1945" (1965)
- Jubilee Medal "Thirty Years of Victory in the Great Patriotic War 1941–1945" (1975)
- Jubilee Medal "Forty Years of Victory in the Great Patriotic War 1941–1945" (1985)
- Jubilee Medal "In Commemoration of the 100th Anniversary of the Birth of Vladimir Ilyich Lenin" (1969)
- Jubilee Medal "30 Years of the Soviet Army and Navy" (1948)
- Jubilee Medal "40 Years of the Armed Forces of the USSR" (1958)
- Jubilee Medal "50 Years of the Armed Forces of the USSR" (1968)
- Jubilee Medal "60 Years of the Armed Forces of the USSR" (1978)
- Jubilee Medal "70 Years of the Armed Forces of the USSR" (1988)
- Medal "For Strengthening Military Cooperation"
- Medal "For Impeccable Service" 1st class
- Medal "Veteran of the Armed Forces of the USSR"
- Medal "In Commemoration of the 800th Anniversary of Moscow" (1947)

Foreign Awards

Democratic Republic of Afghanistan:

- Order of the Red Banner (1982)
- Order of the Saur Revolution (1984)
- Medal "From a grateful Afghan people" (1988)

People's Republic of Bulgaria:

- Order of Georgi Dimitrov (1988)
- Order "The People's Republic of Bulgaria", 1st class (1985)
- Order "September 9, 1944", 1st class with Swords (1974)
- Medal "For Strengthening brotherhood in arms" (1977)
- Medal "30 Years of Victory over Nazi Germany" (1975)
- Medal "40 Years of Victory over Fascism" (1985)
- Medal "90th anniversary of the birth of Georgi Dimitrov" (1974)
- Medal "100th Anniversary of Birth of Georgi Dimitrov" (1984)
- Medal "100 years of the liberation of Bulgaria from the Ottoman yoke" (1978)

China:

- Medal of Sino-Soviet Friendship (1955)

Czechoslovakia:

- Order of the Red Banner (1982)
- Order of 25 February 1948 (1985)
- Medal "30 Years of the Slovak National Uprising" (1974)
- Medal "40 Years of the Slovak National Uprising" (1984)

Cuba:

- Medal "20 years of the Revolutionary Armed Forces" (1976)
- Medal "30 years of the Revolutionary Armed Forces" (1986)

German Democratic Republic:

- Scharnhorst Order (1983)
- Medal "Brotherhood in Arms", 1st class (1980)
- Medal "30 Years of the People's Army of the GDR" (1986)

Mongolian People's Republic:

- Order of Sukhbaatar (1981)
- Medal "30 Years of Victory over Japan" (1975)
- Medal "40 Years of Victory in Khalkhin-Gol" (1979)
- Medal "60 Years of the Armed Forces of the MPR" (1981)

North Korea:

- Medal "40 Years of Liberation of Korea" (1985)

Polish People's Republic:

- Medal "Brotherhood in Arms" (1988)

Socialist Republic of Romania:

- Medal "For Military Merit" (1985)

Vietnam:

- Military Exploit Order, grade 1 (1985)

Military offices
| Preceded by Nikolai Ogarkov | Chief of the General Staff of the Armed Forces of the Soviet Union; 6 September 1984 – 2 November 1988 | Succeeded by Mikhail Moiseyev |
