= Dubenki =

Dubenki (Russian: Дубенки) or Dubyonki (Дубёнки) is the name of several rural localities in Russia:

- Dubenki, Ivanovo Oblast, a selo in Ivanovo Oblast
- Dubyonki, Republic of Mordovia, a selo in the Republic of Mordovia
- Dubenki, name of several other rural localities
