= Vladimir Romashkin =

Mordvin musician

Vladimir Ivanovich Romashkin Владимир Иванович Ромашкин
- Also known as: Yovlan Olo
- Born: September 6, 1951; Ichalki, Mordovian ASSR, Russian SFSR, Soviet Union (present-day Russia)
- Died: August 29, 2002 (aged 50) Saransk, Mordovia, Russia
- Occupations: Folklorist, researcher, musician, documentary filmmaker

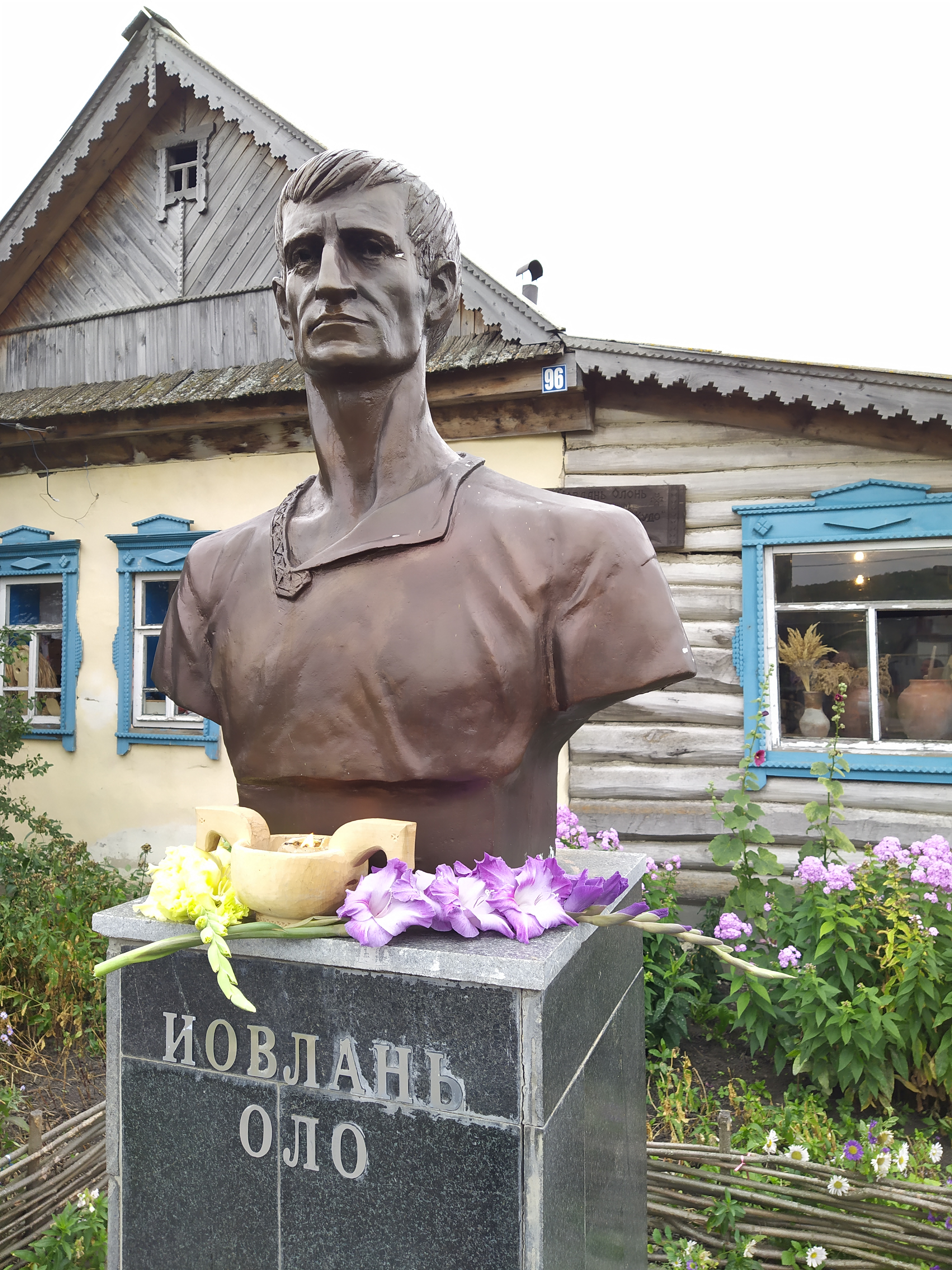
Bust of Romashkin in Podlesnaya Tavla, Mordovia

Vladimir Ivanovich Romashkin (Note: Russian: Владимир Иванович Ромашкин, romanized: Vladimir Ivanovich Romashkin) (also Yovlan Olo, (Note: Erzya: Йовлань Оло, romanized: Ĭovlan’ Olo) 6 September 1951 – 29 August 2002) was an Erzya Mordvin folklorist, researcher, musician, and documentary filmmaker who is considered a significant figure in the cultural revival of the Erzya, Moksha, Shoksha, and Qaratay people. He also created the musical group Toorama.

== Biography ==
Romashkin was born in Ichalki, Dubyonsky District, Mordovian ASSR. In 1975, Romashkin graduated from the conducting and choral department at Saransk Music School. By 1980 he is part of conducting and choral faculty at the Kazan Conservatory, and in 1986 postgraduate study at MNIIYALIE (folklore and art sector). From 1980 to 1989, he was a research in folklore and art at the Mordovia Research Institute of Language, Literature and History. In 1986, he published his monograph "On some Mordovian features-Karataev traditional art of singing", in which he described Qaratay folklore in villages in the Tatar ASSR. Later, he became a screenwriter and filmmaker, with his participation were created documentaries Karatai and Istoki. He also filmed the musical film for Toorama of the same name. From 1990 to his death in 2002, Romashkin was a teacher of musical disciplines at the National School of Culture in Saransk.

Perhaps Romashkins' most famous work was that of the creation of the group Toorama, the repertoire of which included Erzya, Moksha, and Qaratay songs. The repertoire of the group was united by traditions of various ethnic groups living in Mordovia. The group included parts of his family: Romashkin brought his sons, Andrew and Vitaly, to be members of the group.

In his last years, while being in contact with the Russian reenactment movement, Romashkin stood as the head of the youth movement "Od Wii" (New Force). He died in Saransk, Russia.

Toorama, where Romashkins' sons still play a crucial role, continues to give concerts and record albums.

== Honors ==
- Honored Worker of Culture of the Republic of Mordovia.
- Cavalier of the Order of the Cross of St. Mary for his great contribution to the development and dissemination of Finno-Ugric culture in the world (7 March 2001)
- Winner of the Prize of AP Ryabov for his contribution to the preservation and development of the Erzya language (2002)

== Vladimir Romashkin Museum ==
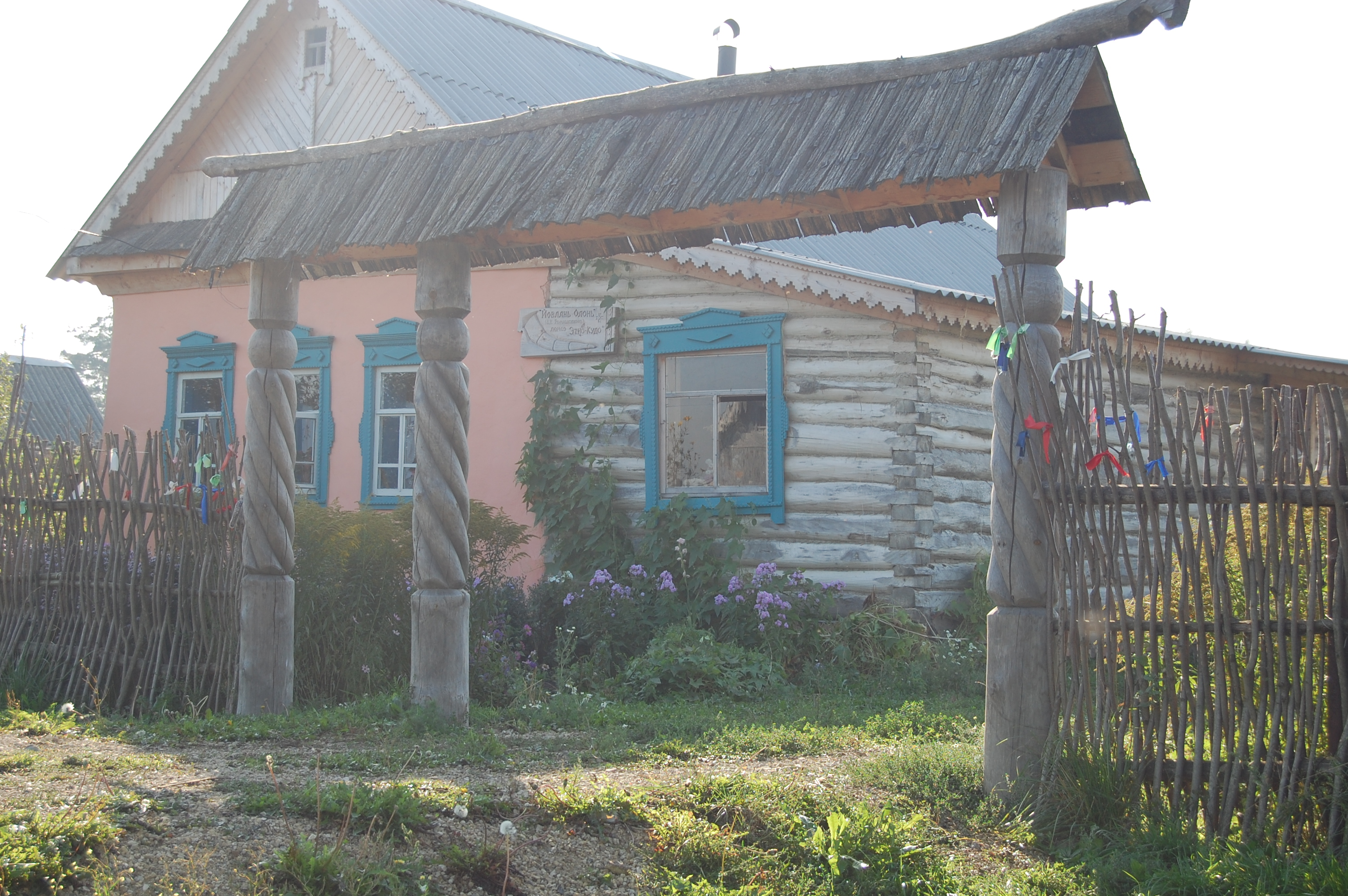
Romashkin «Ethno-kudo» in Podlesnaya Tavla, Mordovia

On 6 September 2006, in Kochkurovsky District in Mordovia, a house museum dedicated to Romashkin opened, called the "Ethno-Kudo". In 1989, while still young, he bought the house in the village of Podlesnaya Tavla, where he fell in love with the village, its people and the natural environment at a glance. As an already known folklorist, he dreamed of an ethno-tourist route in this village, because it is known as the center of Erzya tradition of wood carving. There is a tradition that has now become an annual folklore festival that showcased ancient Erzya and Moksha songs called "Tori terdi" on the birthday of Romashkin.
