= Kirpichnikov =

Kirpichnikov (Russian: Кирпичников) is a surname. Notable people with the surname include:

- Anatoly Kirpichnikov (1929–2020), Russian archaeologist
- Timofey Kirpichnikov (1892–1917/18), Russian soldier
- Vladimir Kirpichnikov (chess player) (born 1948), Latvian chess player
- Vladimir Kirpichnikov (general) (1903–50), Russian general
