= Romashkin =

Romashkin (masculine), Romashkina (feminine) is a Russian-language surname derived from the given name Romashka, a diminutive for Roman.

- Petr Romashkin
- Vladimir Romashkin
- Sergei Romashkin, Russian ice dancer, the first partner of Elena Kustarova
