= Lake Beloye (Nizhny Novgorod Oblast) =

Former lake in Nizhny Novgorod Oblast, Russia

- Location within Russia Location within Nizhny Novgorod Oblast
- Location: Nizhny Novgorod Oblast
- Coordinates: 55°47′35.7″N 42°26′54.8″E
- Type: Freshwater
- Basin countries: Russia

Beloye (Russian: Белое, meaning White) was a small freshwater lake in Nizhny Novgorod Oblast, Russia. It lay approximately 300 meters from the village of Bolotnikovo.

In May 2005, the lake disappeared overnight for unknown reasons. It is speculated that the lake drained into an underground river or cave system due to subsidence. Seventy years before the 2005 disappearance, in 1935, several houses were destroyed under similar circumstances. In 1600, there was a church standing where Beloye Lake was, which sank into the ground over a day.

== See also ==
- Lake Peigneur
