= Simkinsky Sustainable Development Reserve =

Simkinsky Sustainable Development reserve (Russian: Симкинский природный парк устойчивого развития) is a natural reserve located in the Simkinskoye forestry, Bolshebereznikovsky district, in the Republic of Mordovia, Russia, with an area of 1000 hectares. It is a part of the Sura river valley, on which there are coniferous and deciduous forests, meadows and marshes, numerous lake floodplains.

Simkinsky Sustainable Development reserve was created in 2001 on the basis of the Simkinsky landscape reserve on the initiative of Vyacheslav Smirnov, the head of the children's environmental organization "Green World". It is distinguished by a variety of flora (more than 40 species of plants, lichens and fungi included in the Red Book of the Republic of Mordovia and the Red Data Book of the Russian Federation) and the fauna (beaver, muskrat, moose, roe deer, wild boar, European mink, marten, capercaillie, black grouse, common crane, gray heron, Apollo butterflies, Papilio machaon, Scarce swallowtail, Zerynthia polyxena, carpenter bee). On the territory of the park there is a biological station of the Mordovia State University, where students of the biological faculty of the Mordovian University made their field practice every year and environmental summer camps take place.
