= Toorama =

Russian traditional music group from Mordovia

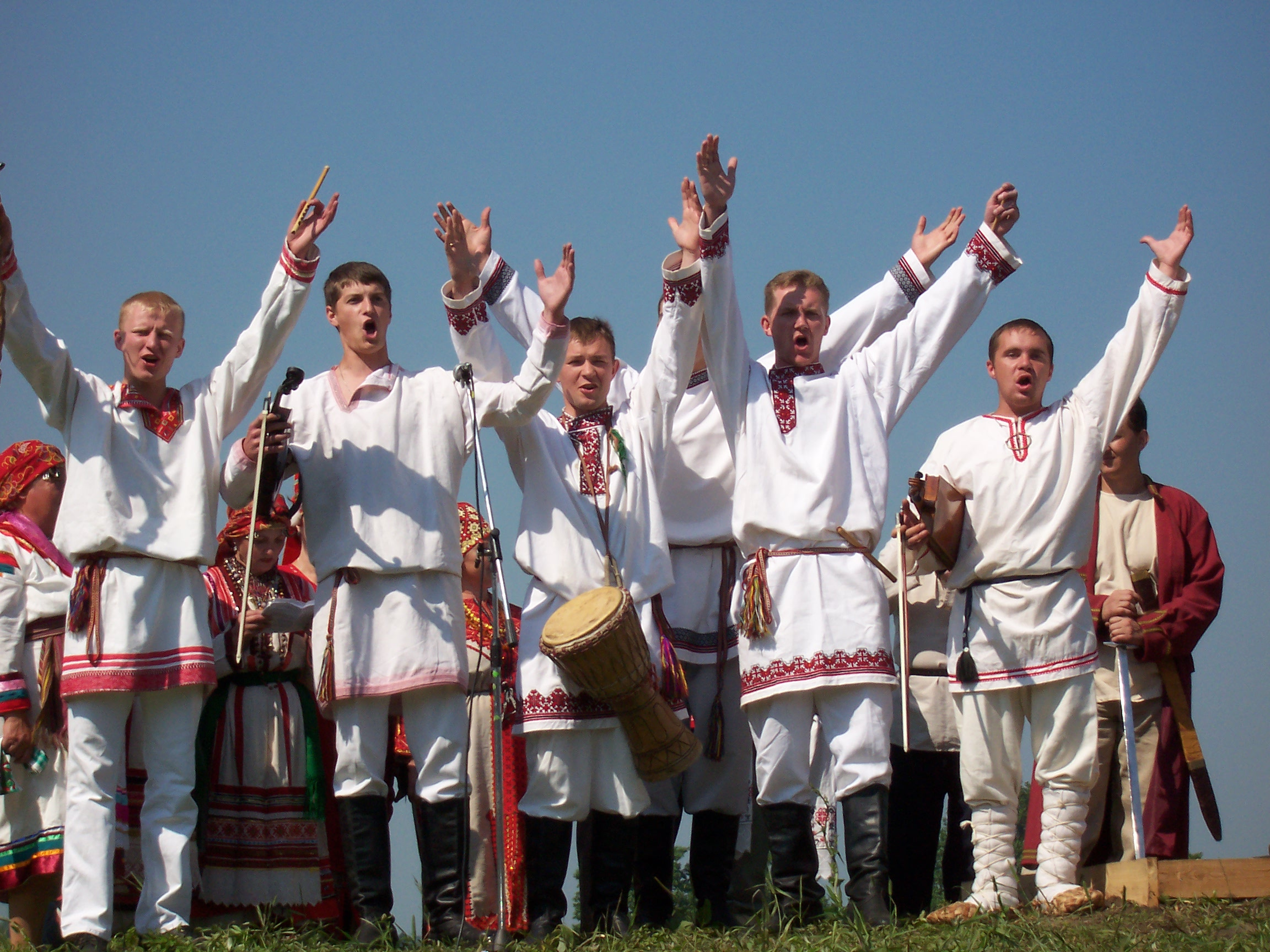
2004 performance in Chukaly, Mordovia

Torama (Russian: То́рама, alternative name in Erzya: Йо́влат) is a music group from Saransk, Mordovia in Russia, performing traditional songs and music of Mordvin ethnic groups, namely Erzya, Moksha, Shoksha, and Qaratay.

== History ==
Created in 1990 by 4 researchers of Mordvin language and traditions across the USSR, Torama was originally a choir of 9 men. Eventually, Vladimir Romashkin, a researcher and documentary film maker, emerged as the group's frontman. The ensemble Finno-Ugric ties eventually brought forward the Latinized spelling of the group's name via "oo" for long "o" instead of single "o" used in its Russian name Torama. In 2002, Vladimir Romashkin died.

== Discography ==
- 1996 Toorama — Mordvin Songs — Songs from Erzya Mordvin. MIPUCD 502, 1996. Traditional Erzya songs (recorded and released in Finland)
- 2000 Toorama — Taga Eriaza Shkai! (in Erzyan language, recorded and issued in Estonia by Eesti erza-moksha söprade selts, Estonian Erzya-Moksha Friendship Association)
- 2001 MeNaiset & Toorama — Mastorava (an Erzya and Finnish language album in collaboration with Finnish female 8-piece choir MeNaiset (collaboration on compositions 8-12, recorded in Leonora Hall at the Kallio-Kuninkala Course Center of the Sibelius Academy in January 1997.); MMCD1; Label: Sterns.
- 2002 Toorama — Godspeed (recording: Kallio_Kuninkala, Javenpaa, Finland, IV/1996; recording & mixing: Jouko Kyhala; mastering: Finnvox/Pauli Saastamoinen; produced by Toorama in Moscow and Saransk, in Russia)
- 2018 Catch Up the Time

== Cultural contribution ==
=== Polyphonic singing ===
Finno-Ugric singing tradition is most often described as bivocal, with 2 vocal lines developed in a choir.

=== Instrumental performance ===
While choir singing is widely represented across villages of Mordvins and in Saransk, the living instrumental ensemble performance was practically extinct to the point when Toorama started its reconstruction work and developed the instruments anew.
