= Ryskino =

Ryskino (Russian: Рыскино) is the name of several rural localities in Russia:

- Ryskino, Republic of Mordovia, a selo in Kazenno-Maydansky Selsoviet of Kovylkinsky District in the Republic of Mordovia; 53°54′N 44°7′E
- Ryskino, Tver Oblast, a village in Knyashchinskoye Rural Settlement of Vyshnevolotsky District in Tver Oblast
