= Kochkurovo =

Kochkurovo (Russian: Кочкурово) is the name of several rural localities in Russia:

- Kochkurovo, Dubyonsky District, Republic of Mordovia, a selo in the Republic of Mordovia
- Kochkurovo, Kochkurovsky District, Republic of Mordovia, a selo in the Republic of Mordovia
- Kochkurovo, Nizhny Novgorod Oblast, a selo in Nizhny Novgorod Oblast
