= Viktor Lensky =

Russian scientist (1913–1996)

- Виктор Степанович Ленский
- Born: 1913-02-23; Staraya Nechaevka, Saransky Uyezd, Penza Governorate, Russian Empire
- Died: 1998-03-07; Moscow, Russia
- Citizenship: Russian Empire, USSR, Russia
- Education: MSU Faculty of Mechanics and Mathematics (1938); Doctor of Philosophy in Physics and Mathematics (1947); Doctor of Sciences in Physics and Mathematics (1960); Professor (1963)
- Occupation: Scientist
- Years active: 1938–1998
- Organization: MSU Faculty of Mechanics and Mathematics
- Known for: His works in Continuum mechanics
- Children: Anatoly Lensky, Erlen Lensky
- Awards: Order of the Patriotic War; Order of the Red Star; Medal "For Courage" (2); Medal "For the Victory over Germany in the Great Patriotic War 1941–1945"; Medal "For the Capture of Königsberg"; Lomonosov Award
- Honours: Distinguished Worker of Science and Technology of the RSFSR; Distinguished Professor of Moscow State University

Viktor Stepanovich Lensky (Russian: Виктор Степанович Ленский; 23 February 1913 – 7 March 1998) was a soviet and Russian scientist who worked in the field of continuum mechanics.

== Biography ==
Viktor Lensky was born on February 10 (23) 1913 in the village of Staraya Nechaevka in the family of a clergyman. In 1930 he graduated from a nine-year school, then worked as a laborer. In 1932 he entered the Physics and Mathematics Faculty of the Rostov State Pedagogical Institute. In 1935 he was transferred to the Department of Elasticity theory of the mechanical and mathematical faculty of Moscow State University named after Mikhail Lomonosov. His field of scientific interests includes dynamics of elastic bodies, plasticity.

- Participant of Eastern Front (World War II) (1942—1945, radio operator and scout). He was awarded the Order of the Patriotic War, Order of the Red Star, two Medals "For Courage", Medal "For the Victory over Germany in the Great Patriotic War 1941–1945" and Medal "For the Capture of Königsberg".
- Doctor of Philosophy in the field of Physics and Mathematics for "On one-dimensional longitudinal elastic fluctuations of support." (1947)
- Doctor of Sciences in the field of Physics and Mathematics for "Research of the plasticity of metals in complex load." (1961)
- Professor of the Department of elasticity theory of Moscow State University (1963). Distinguished Worker of Science and Technology of the RSFSR (1974). Distinguished Professor of Moscow State University (1997).
- Winner of the Lomonosov Award of Moscow State University I degree (1996) for "Theory of elastic processes: experimental-theoretical research".
