= Bolotnikovo =

Bolotnikovo may refer to:

- Bolotnikovo, Republic of Mordovia, a village (selo) in the Republic of Mordovia, Russia
- Bolotnikovo, name of several other rural localities in Russia

== See also ==
- Bolotnik
