= Timofey Kirpichnikov =

Russian soldier (1892–1917/1918)

Timofey Ivanovich Kirpichnikov
- Тимофей Иванович Кирпичников
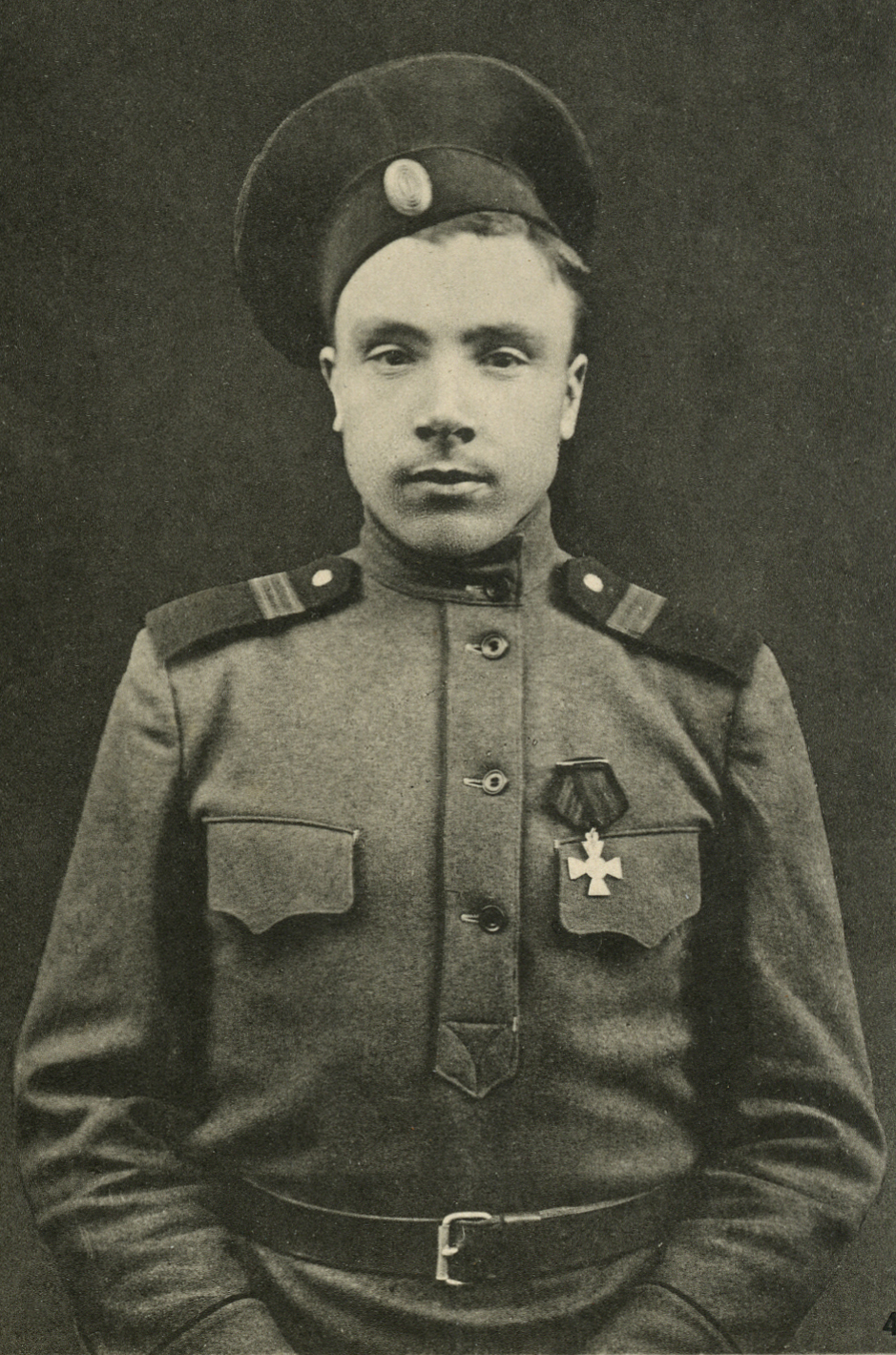
- Born: 1892; Saransky Uyezd, Penza Governorate. Russian Empire
- Died: 1917/1918
- Military career
- Allegiance: Russian Empire; Russian Republic
- Branch: Imperial Russian Army; Russian Army (from 1917)
- Unit: Volhynian Life Guards Regiment
- Conflicts: World War I

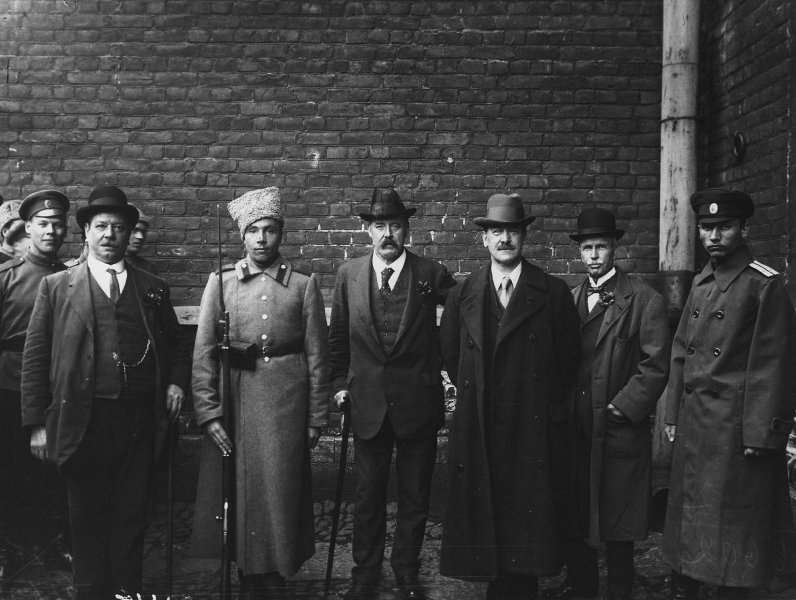
Kirpichnikov (second from left in front row) with Russian soldiers and representatives of English workers' unions.

Timofey Ivanovich Kirpichnikov (Russian: Тимофей Иванович Кирпичников; 1892 – 1917/1918) was an active participant of the February Revolution, where he aligned himself with the short-lived Russian Republic. Rising against the Russian Empire, Kirpichnikov was the initiator of the Petrograd garrison's uprising.

== Life ==
Timofey Kirpichnikov was born in the Old Believers' peasant family in the village of Dmitrovka in the Saransky Uyezd of the Penza Governorate of the Russian Empire.

During World War I, Kirpichnikov fought on the Austrian front, was wounded in the hand and after a hospital stay ended up in Petrograd. As a war veteran, Kirpichnikov was popular among Imperial Russian Army soldiers, but was also noted for his sternness.

After the start of the February Revolution, Kirpichnikov was a member of the Volinsky Regiment tasked with bringing order to Petrograd. He helped lead the mutiny of this regiment against this order and was sometimes referred as the “First Soldier of the Revolution.” During the April Crisis, when Bolsheviks led by Lenin tried to seize power, Kirpichnikov provided the Russian Provisional Government with military support which temporarily halted the crisis.

After the October Revolution, Kirpichnikov planned to join the newly formed Russian White Army fighting against Bolsheviks. Kirpichnikov, however, became unpopular among some Imperial Russian officials due to his anti-imperialist stance. At the meeting with Imperial Russian general Alexander Kutepov in 1917/1918 he was suddenly apprehended and summarily executed by shooting.
