= Permisi =

Rural locality in Bolshebereznikovsky District, Mordovia, Russia

Coordinates: 54°06′N 45°48′E

Permisi (Russian: Перми́си; Erzya: Пермезь, Permeź) is a village (selo) in Bolshebereznikovsky District of the Republic of Mordovia, Russia.
