= Maly Umys =

Rural locality in Kochkurovsky District, Mordovia, Russia

Coordinates: 53°57′N 45°30′E

Maly Umys (Russian: Ма́лый Умы́с) is a village in Kochkurovsky District of the Republic of Mordovia, Russia.
