= Povodimovo =

Rural locality in Dubyonsky District, Mordovia, Russia

Coordinates: 54°28′N 46°19′E

Povodimovo (Russian: Поводимово, Erzya: Поводеле, Povodele) is a rural locality (a selo) in Dubyonsky District of the Republic of Mordovia, Russia with a population of 2,312 (2010 census); 2,452 (2002 census).
