= Nerley =

Village in Mordovia, Russia

Coordinates: 54°05′N 45°42′E

Nerley (Russian: Нерлей) is a village (selo) in Bolshebereznikovsky District of the Republic of Mordovia, Russia.
