= Evgeny Vladimirovich Chetvergov =

Erzya writer, journalist (1995–2015)

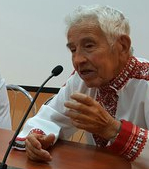
Vidije, 2016

Evgeny Vladimirovich Chetvergov (Russian cyrillic: Евгений Владимирович Четвергов) alias Nujan Vidjaz (Erzya: Нуянь Видяз) (born Ardatovo, Mordovia, March 30, 1934) is an Erzya writer. He has written several books in Russian and Erzya. He is editor-in-chief of the journal Erzyan Mastor.

== Life ==
He studied agricultural science and worked as an agricultural engineer and as a professor at the Mordovian State University. He was one of the founders of the cultural club "Mastorava".

== Works ==
- Сиреневая луна (1989)
- Велень вайгельть (1992)
- Сырнень човалят (1995)
- Иень тюст (2003)
- Янгамо (2006)
- Эрзянь Масторонть седейсэ. Имена их бессмертны (2007)
- Где цветет чистодуш? (2009)
- Эрязденть арсезь (2010)
- Ванине (2011)
- Тесэ ды Тосо (2013)
- Финно-угры в русском языке: топонимо-этимологический словарь финно-язычных, угорских и селькупских слов, вошедших в лексику русского языка (2015)
- Поладкстомо (2016)
