= Atemar =

Village in Lyambirsky district of Mordovia, Russia

Coordinates: 54°11′N 45°24′E

Atemar (Russian: Атема́р; Erzya: Атямарь, Atämaŕ) is a rural locality (a selo) in Lyambirsky District of the Republic of Mordovia, Russia. Population: 4,078 (2010 census); 4,146 (2002 census).
