= Avgury, Mordovia =

Avgury Авгуры
- Village
- Location within Republic of Mordovia Location within Russia
- Coordinates: 54°29′N 44°31′E
- Country: Russia
- Region: Mordovia
- District: Staroshaygovsky District
- Time zone: UTC+3:00

Avgury (Russian: Авгуры) is a rural locality (a selo) in Novofedorovskoye Rural Settlement of Staroshaygovsky District, Mordovia, Russia. The population was 63 as of 2010. There is 1 street.

== Geography ==
Avgury is located 25 km north of Staroye Shaygovo (the district's administrative centre) by road. Vertelim is the nearest rural locality.
