= Krasny Bogatyr =

Krasny Bogatyr Красный Богатырь
- Settlement
- Location within Vladimir Oblast Location within Russia
- Coordinates: 56°00′N 41°07′E
- Country: Russia
- Region: Vladimir Oblast
- District: Sudogodsky District
- Time zone: UTC+3:00

Krasny Bogatyr (Russian: Красный Богатырь) is a rural locality (a settlement) in Andreyevskoye Rural Settlement, Sudogodsky District, Vladimir Oblast, Russia. The population was 966 as of 2010. There are 12 streets.

== Geography ==
Krasny Bogatyr is located 28 km southwest of Sudogda (the district's administrative centre) by road. Bolotsky is the nearest rural locality.
