= Lyambir (rural locality) =

Rural locality in Mordovia, Russia

Coordinates: 54°16′53″N 45°07′20″E

Lyambir (Russian: Ля́мбирь, Erzya: Лямбирь, Lämbiŕ; Tatar: Ләмбрә, Lämbrä) is a rural locality (a selo) and the administrative center of Lyambirsky District of the Republic of Mordovia, Russia. Population: 8,457 (2010 census); 8,467 (2002 census); 8,389 (1989 Soviet census).

Flag of Lyambir

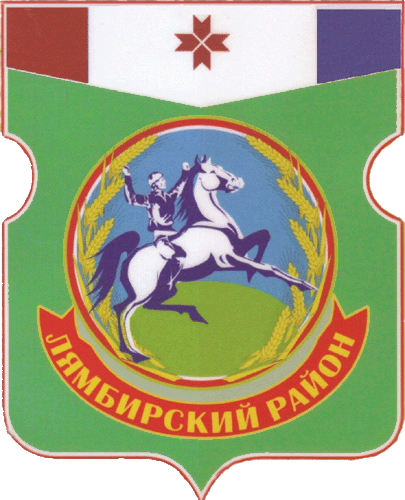
Coat of arms of Lyambir
