= Tokmovo =

Rural locality in Kovylkinsky District, Mordovia, Russia

Coordinates: 54°03′N 44°05′E

Tokmovo (Russian: Токмо́во) is a village (selo) in Kovylkinsky District of the Republic of Mordovia, Russia.
