= Podlesnaya Tavla =

Human settlement in Kochkurovsky District, Republic of Mordovia, Russia

Coordinates: 54°5′50″N 45°28′45″E

Podlesnaya Tavla (Russian: Подле́сная Та́вла, Erzya: Вирь Тавла, Viŕ Tavla) is a rural locality (a selo) in Kochkurovsky District of the Republic of Mordovia, Russia. Population: 606 (2010 census); 704 (2002 census).
