= Flemish name =

Names consist of one or several given names and a surname. The given name, as (usually) in English, is gender-specific.

Since Belgium has three national languages — Dutch, French and German — Belgian names are similar to those in the neighbouring countries: the Netherlands, France and Germany. Thanks to this multiculturalism, Belgium has one of the highest number of surnames in the world (no less than 190,000 at the last count), and certainly the highest per capita ratio, about 1 family name for 53 people. Place names (regions, towns, villages, hamlets) with a particle meaning "from" (de in French, or van in Flemish) are the most numerous. An uncapitalised particle sometimes indicates nobility.

Some differences exist between names in Flanders and in the Netherlands: for example, Flemish names commonly have prefixes as mentioned, except that these usually start with a capital letter, and are often written connected to the main word. Thus, de Bakker and van der Steen are probably Dutch while De Bakker and Vandersteen are Belgian Flemish. (Note: This distinction may have faded in surnames of Americans of Dutch or Belgian Flemish heritage.) The most common Flemish surnames in Belgium are Peeters, Janssens, Maes, Jacobs, Willems, Mertens, Claes, Wouters, Goossens, and De Smet. Flemish surnames tend to resemble first names more often than in the Netherlands, e.g. the following first names relate to above surnames: e.g. Peter, Jan, Jacob, Willem, Maarten, Klaas, and Wouter. The trailing s reportedly once meant "son of", so Willems would be "Willem's son". Furthermore, older or historically different regional spellings remain visible in many names, e.g. usage of c instead of k and ae instead of aa (compare Claes with Klaas).

In Belgium, as in English speaking countries, South Africa, Italy and (considering articles) France, indexing includes the tussenvoegsels, leading to large sections under "D" and "V". In Belgium, primarily in West Flanders, prepositions and articles can be compounded with the surname (such as Vandecasteele) and a few combinations occur (Vande Casteele).

In Flanders, tussenvoegsels of personal names always keep their original orthography: "mevrouw Van der Velde", "Van der Velde, A.", and "Van den Broeke, Jan". In the Netherlands the first letter of the tussenvoegsel is written with lower case in the above four exceptional cases, whereas in Flanders it is written according to the entry for the person in the population register and on his official ID. This implies that in Belgium it is usually written with an upper case with the exception for names of nobility or the royalty; for those they are always in lower case, also in Belgium. See for an alternative discussion of the capitalization and collation issues around separable affixes in Dutch Van (Dutch).

Most common surnames (2021)
1. Peeters
2. Janssens
3. Maes
4. Jacobs
5. Mertens
6. Willems
7. Claes
8. Goossens
9. Wouters
10. De Smet

== See also ==
- Dutch name
- Netherlands name etymology
