= Bolshiye Berezniki =

Rural locality in Mordovia, Russia

Bolshiye Berezniki Больши́е Бере́зники
- Village
- Interactive map of Bolshiye Berezniki
- Country: Russia
- Republic: Mordovia
- District: Bolshebereznikovsky

Population
  - Total: 6,393

Bolshiye Berezniki (Russian: Больши́е Бере́зники, Erzya: Покш Килейбуе веле, Pokš Kilejbuje vele) is a rural locality (a selo) and the administrative center of Bolshebereznikovsky District of the Republic of Mordovia, Russia. Population: 6,393 (2010 census); 6,398 (2002 census); 6,675 (1989 Soviet census).
