= Khlebino =

Rural locality in Tengushevsky District, Mordovia, Russia

Coordinates: 54°38′N 42°50′E

Khlebino (Russian: Хле́бино) is a village (selo) in Tengushevsky District of the Republic of Mordovia.
