= Shadym =

Village in Russia

Coordinates: 53°54′N 44°03′E

Shadym (Russian: Шады́м) is a village (selo) in Kovylkinsky District of the Republic of Mordovia, Russia.
