= Degilyovka =

Village in the Republic of Mordovia, Russia

Coordinates: 54°09′32″N 45°40′53″E

Degilyovka (Russian: Дегилёвка) is a village in Bolshebereznikovsky District of the Republic of Mordovia, Russia.
