= Kemlya =

Rural locality in Mordovia, Russia

Coordinates: 54°41′39″N 45°15′20″E

Kemlya (Russian: Ке́мля, Erzya: Кемля, Kemlä) is a rural locality (a selo) and the administrative center of Ichalkovsky District of the Republic of Mordovia, Russia. Population: 4,826 (2010 census); 4,872 (2002 census); 4,953 (1989 Soviet census).
