= Dubenki, Ivanovo Oblast =

Dubenki Дубенки
- Selo
- Location within Ivanovo Oblast Location within Russia
- Coordinates: 56°28′N 39°58′E
- Country: Russia
- Region: Ivanovo Oblast
- District: Gavrilovo-Posadsky District
- Time zone: UTC+3:00

Dubenki (Russian: Дубенки) is a rural locality (a selo) in Gavrilovo-Posadsky District, Ivanovo Oblast, Russia. Population: 30 (2010 census);

== Geography ==
This rural locality is located 13 km from Gavrilov Posad (the district's administrative centre), 84 km from Ivanovo (capital of Ivanovo Oblast) and 165 km from Moscow. Klyuchi is the nearest rural locality.
