= Kirlyay =

Rural locality in Kovylkinsky District, Mordovia, Russia

Coordinates: 54°16′N 43°51′E

Kirlyay (Russian: Кирляй) is a village in Kovylkinsky District of the Republic of Mordovia, Russia.
