= Mazilug =

Rural locality in Torbeyevsky District, Mordovia, Russia

Coordinates: 54°05′N 43°12′E

Mazilug (Russian: Мазилуг) is a rural locality (a village) in Torbeyevsky District of the Republic of Mordovia, Russia. It is in administrative jurisdiction of the urban-type settlement of Torbeyevo and is located within 3 kilometers (1.9 mi) of it. Population is mostly Mordovian.
