= Sorliney =

Village in Chamzinsky, Mordovia, Russia

Coordinates: 54°26′N 46°03′E

Sorliney (Russian: Сорлиней) is a village (selo) in Chamzinsky District of the Republic of Mordovia, Russia.
