= Bolotnikovo, Republic of Mordovia =

Rural locality in Lyambirsky District, Mordovia, Russia

Coordinates: 54°16′32″N 44°55′28″E

Bolotnikovo (Russian: Боло́тниково) is a village (selo) in Lyambirsky District of the Republic of Mordovia, Russia.
