= Kochkurovo, Kochkurovsky District, Republic of Mordovia =

Rural locality in Mordovia, Russia

Coordinates: 54°02′10″N 45°25′57″E

Kochkurovo (Russian: Кочку́рово, Erzya: Кочкур веле, Kočkur vele) is a rural locality (a selo) and the administrative center of Kochkurovsky District of the Republic of Mordovia, Russia. Population: 3,198 (2010 census); 3,259 (2002 census); 3,476 (1989 Soviet census).
