= Qaratay =

Mordvinian ethnic group of southwest Tatarstan, Russia

Qaratays, also known as Karatais, Karatays (Russian: Каратаи, Karatay; Tatar: Каратайлар, Qarataylar; Moksha: каратайхть, karatajiť), are a Mordvinian ethnic group in Kamsko-Ustyinsky District, Tatarstan around the village of Mordovsky Karatay. They speak a variety of the Tatar language complemented by Moksha words, which is sometimes considered as a Qaratay dialect of the Kazan Tatar language. They number about 100.

Once they lived in three villages, but one of them was submerged by Kuybyshev Reservoir. Another one was re-settled as "unprospective" during the 1950s. The village of Mordovsky Karatay became the last Qaratay village.

Their ancestors lived in the territory of today Tatarstan and were assimilated by Volga Bolgars and Tatars between the 8th and 15th centuries. Living around Tatars, they started speaking a Tatar language. Neighbouring Mordvins in Tetyushsky District, however, still speak a Uralic language.
