= Staroshaygovsky District =

Staroshaygovsky District Старошайговский район (Russian)
- District

Other transcription(s)
  - Moksha: Сире Шяйгавонь район
  - Erzya: Ташто Шайгабуе
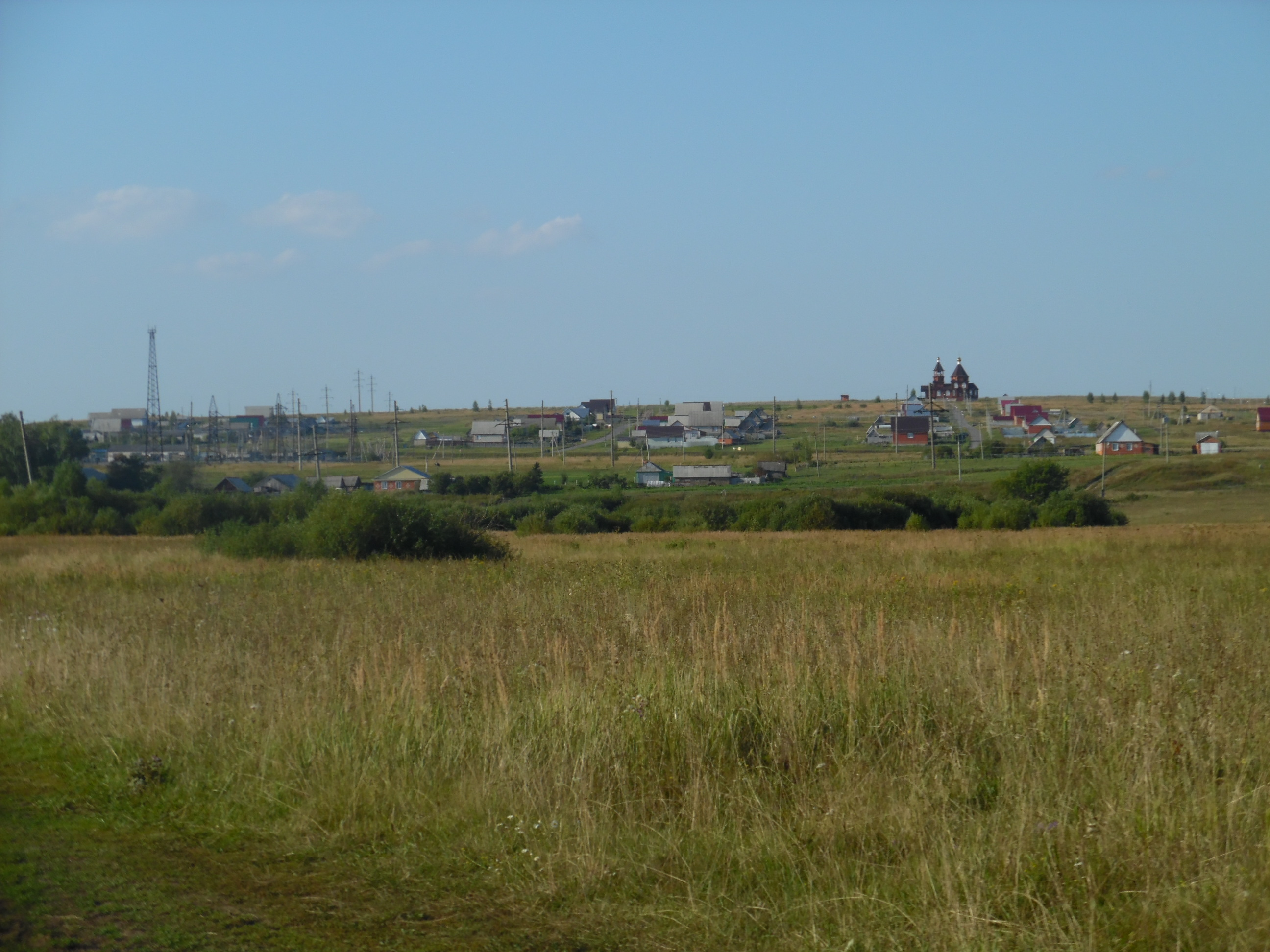
- Landscape in Staroshaygovsky District
- Location of Staroshaygovsky District in the Republic of Mordovia
- Coordinates: 54°18′N 44°28′E
- Country: Russia
- Federal subject: Republic of Mordovia
- Established: 16 July 1928
- Administrative center: Staroye Shaygovo

Area
  - Total: 1,419.4 km^{2} (548.0 sq mi)

Population (2010 Census)
  - Total: 14,071
  - Density: 9.9133/km^{2} (25.675/sq mi)
  - Urban: 0%
  - Rural: 100%

Administrative structure
  - Administrative divisions: 17 Selsoviets
  - Inhabited localities: 57 rural localities

Municipal structure
  - Municipally incorporated as: Staroshaygovsky Municipal District
  - Municipal divisions: 0 urban settlements, 17 rural settlements
- Time zone: UTC+3 (MSK)
- OKTMO ID: 89646000
- Website: http://staroshajgovo.e-mordovia.ru/

Population of Staroshaygovsky District
- 2010 Census: 14,071
- 2002 Census: 15,870
- 1989 Census: 18,422
- 1979 Census: 25,168

Staroshaygovsky District (Russian: Старошайго́вский райо́н; Moksha: Сире Шяйгавонь аймак, Sire Šäjgavoń ajmak; Erzya: Ташто Шайгабуе, Tašto Šajgabuje) is an administrative and municipal district (raion), one of the twenty-two in the Republic of Mordovia, Russia. It is located in the northern and central parts of the republic and borders with Nizhny Novgorod Oblast in the north, Lyambirsky District in the east, Ruzayevsky District in the south, Kadoshkinsky District in the southwest, and with Krasnoslobodsky District in the west. The area of the district is 1,419.4 square kilometers (548.0 sq mi). Its administrative center is the rural locality (a selo) of Staroye Shaygovo. As of the 2010 Census, the total population of the district was 14,071, with the population of Staroye Shaygovo accounting for 36.9% of that number.

== Administrative and municipal status ==
Within the framework of administrative divisions, Staroshaygovsky District is one of the twenty-two in the republic. The district is divided into seventeen selsoviets which comprise fifty-seven rural localities. As a municipal division, the district is incorporated as Staroshaygovsky Municipal District. Its seventeen selsoviets are incorporated into seventeen rural settlements within the municipal district. The selo of Staroye Shaygovo serves as the administrative center of both the administrative and municipal district.
