= Ichalkovsky District =

Ichalkovsky District Ичалковский район (Russian)
- District

Other transcription(s)
  - Erzya: Ицял буе
  - Moksha: Ичалконь аймак
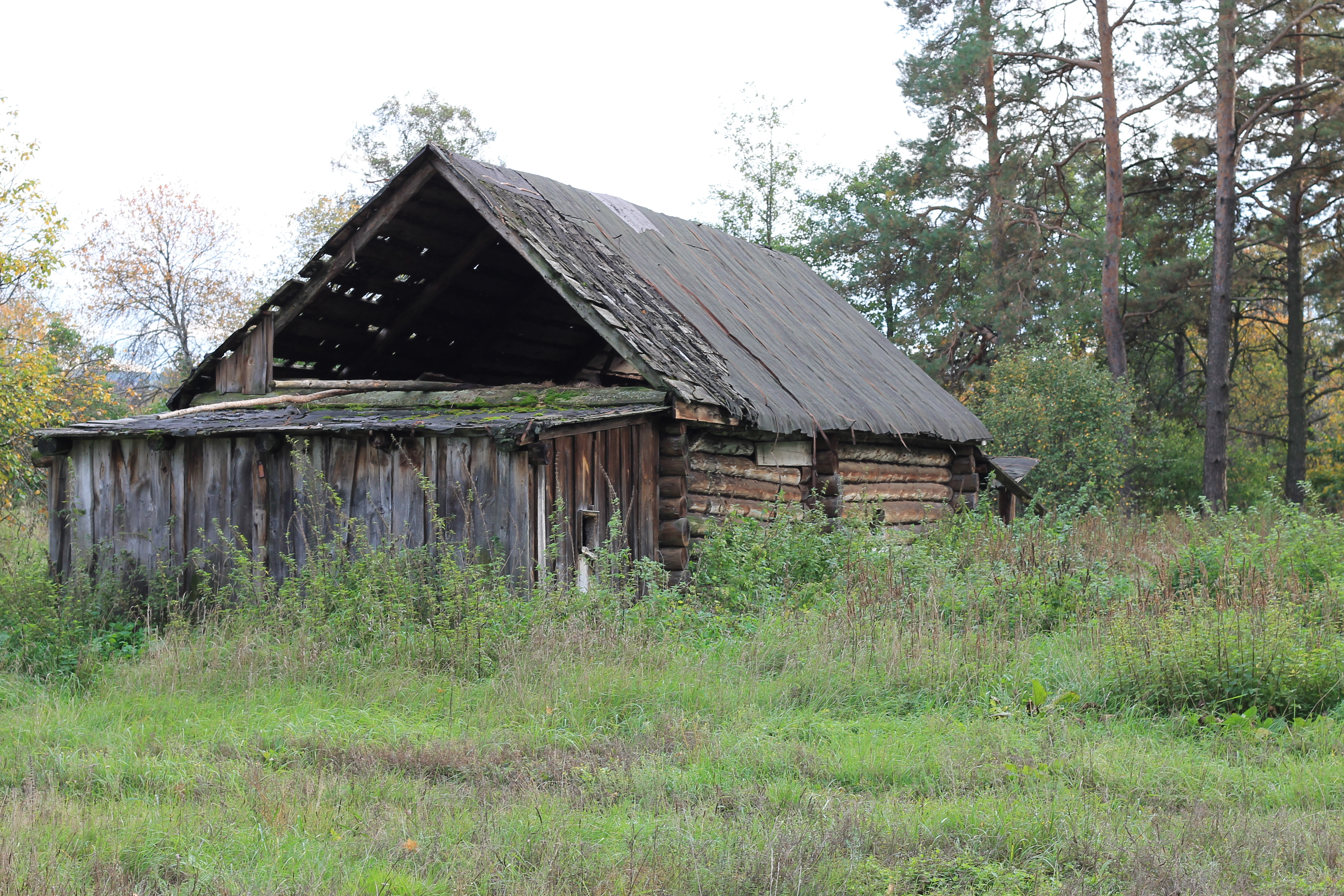
- Forest in Ichalkovsky District
- Location of Ichalkovsky District in the Republic of Mordovia
- Coordinates: 54°42′N 45°14′E
- Country: Russia
- Federal subject: Republic of Mordovia
- Administrative center: Kemlya

Area
  - Total: 1,265 km^{2} (488 sq mi)

Population (2010 Census)
  - Total: 20,582
  - Density: 16.27/km^{2} (42.14/sq mi)
  - Urban: 0%
  - Rural: 100%

Administrative structure
  - Administrative divisions: 14 Selsoviets
  - Inhabited localities: 60 rural localities

Municipal structure
  - Municipally incorporated as: Ichalkovsky Municipal District
  - Municipal divisions: 0 urban settlements, 14 rural settlements
- Time zone: UTC+3 (MSK)
- OKTMO ID: 89626000
- Website: http://www.ichalkirm.ru

Population of Ichalkovsky District
- 2010 Census: 20,582
- 2002 Census: 22,835
- 1989 Census: 26,578
- 1979 Census: 33,997

Ichalkovsky District (Russian: Ича́лковский райо́н; Erzya: Ицял буе, Itsäl buje; Moksha: Ичалконь аймак, Ičalkoń ajmak) is an administrative and municipal district (raion), one of the twenty-two in the Republic of Mordovia, Russia. It is located in the northeast of the republic. The area of the district is 1,265 square kilometers (488 sq mi). Its administrative center is the rural locality (a selo) of Kemlya. As of the 2010 Census, the total population of the district was 20,582, with the population of Kemlya accounting for 23.5 % of that number.

== Administrative and municipal status ==
Within the framework of administrative divisions, Ichalkovsky District is one of the twenty-two in the republic. The district is divided into fourteen selsoviets which comprise sixty rural localities. As a municipal division, the district is incorporated as Ichalkovsky Municipal District. Its fourteen selsoviets are incorporated into fourteen rural settlements within the municipal district. The selo of Kemlya serves as the administrative center of both the administrative and municipal district.
