= Dubyonki, Republic of Mordovia =

Rural locality in Mordovia, Russia

Coordinates: 54°25′52″N 46°18′03″E

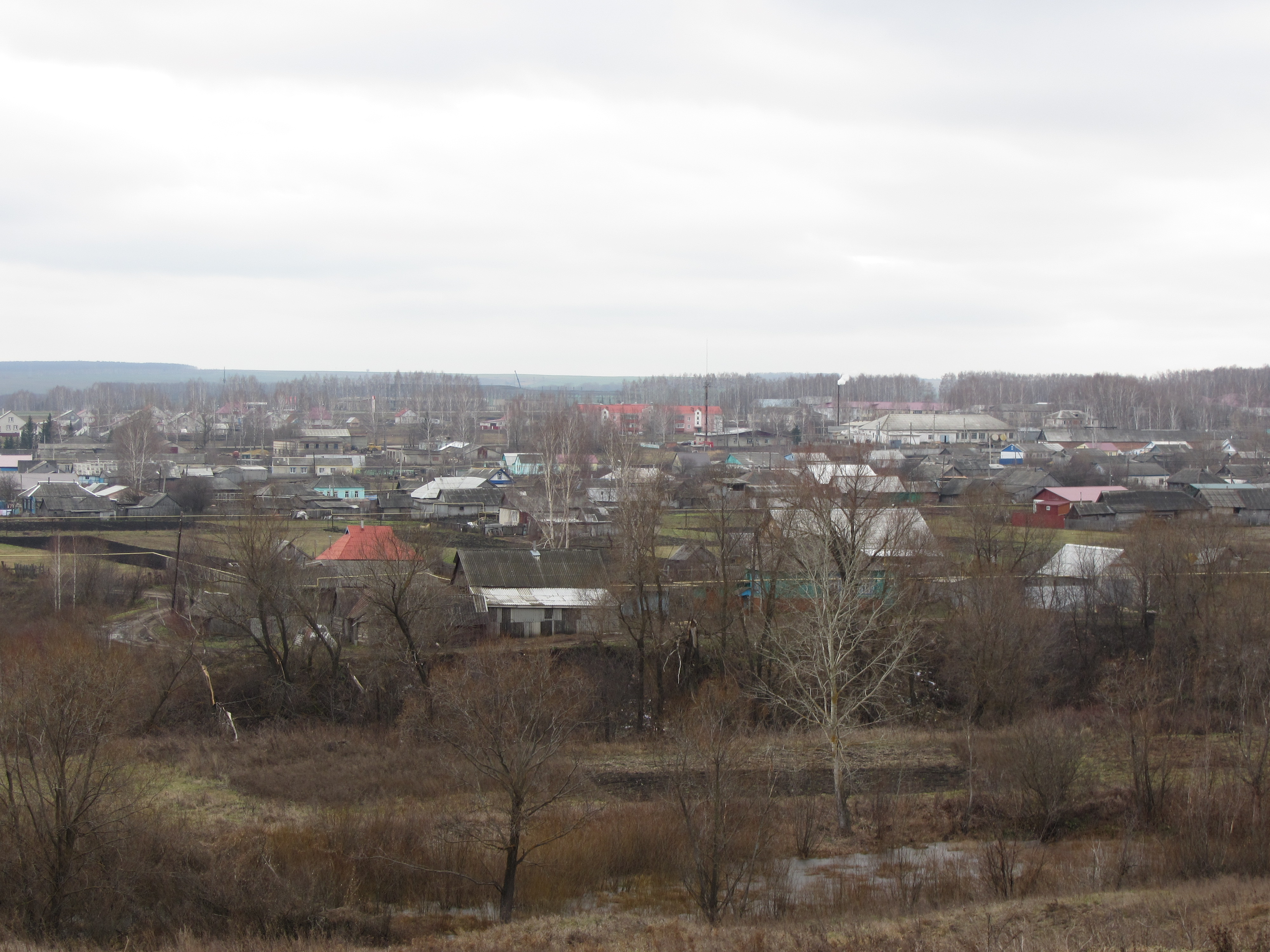
View of Dubyonki

Dubyonki (Russian: Дубёнки; Erzya: Дубинька, Dubińka) is a rural locality (a selo) and the administrative center of Dubyonsky District of the Republic of Mordovia, Russia. Population: 3,325 (2010 census); 3,581 (2002 census); 3,837 (1989 Soviet census).
