= Vindrey =

Village in Mordovia, Russia

Coordinates: 54°15′N 43°00′E

Vindrey (Russian: Виндре́й) is a village (selo) in Torbeyevsky District of the Republic of Mordovia, Russia. In the 1930s, it had a status of urban-type settlement, but was demoted to a rural locality on January 27, 1939.
