= Ryskino, Republic of Mordovia =

Rural locality in Kovylkinsky District, Mordovia, Russia

Coordinates: 53°54′N 44°07′E

Ryskino (Russian: Рыскино) is a rural locality (a selo) in Kazenno-Maydansky Selsoviet of Kovylkinsky District in the Republic of Mordovia, Russia.
