= Staroye Shaygovo =

Rural locality in Mordovia, Russia

Coordinates: 54°18′30″N 44°27′49″E

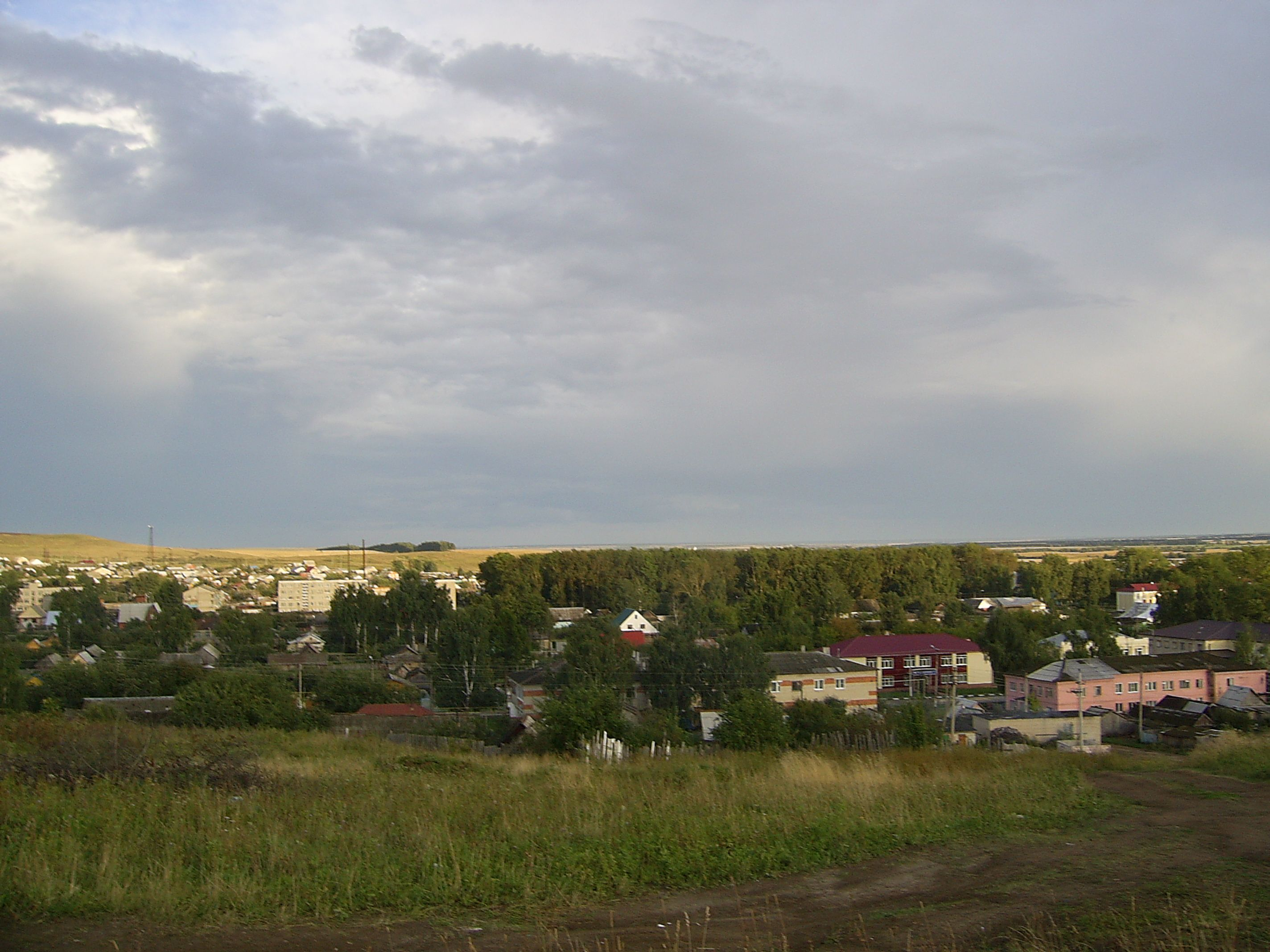

Staroye Shaygovo (Russian: Ста́рое Ша́йгово; Moksha: Сире Шяйгав, Sire Šäjgav; Erzya: Сире Шайгав, Sire Šajgav) is a rural locality (a selo) and the administrative center of Staroshaygovsky District of the Republic of Mordovia, Russia. Population: 5,185 (2010 census); 5,205 (2002 census); 5,258 (1989 Soviet census).
