= Dubyonsky District, Republic of Mordovia =

Dubyonsky District Дубёнский район (Russian)
- District

Other transcription(s)
  - Erzya: Тумобуе
  - Moksha: Дубёнкань аймак
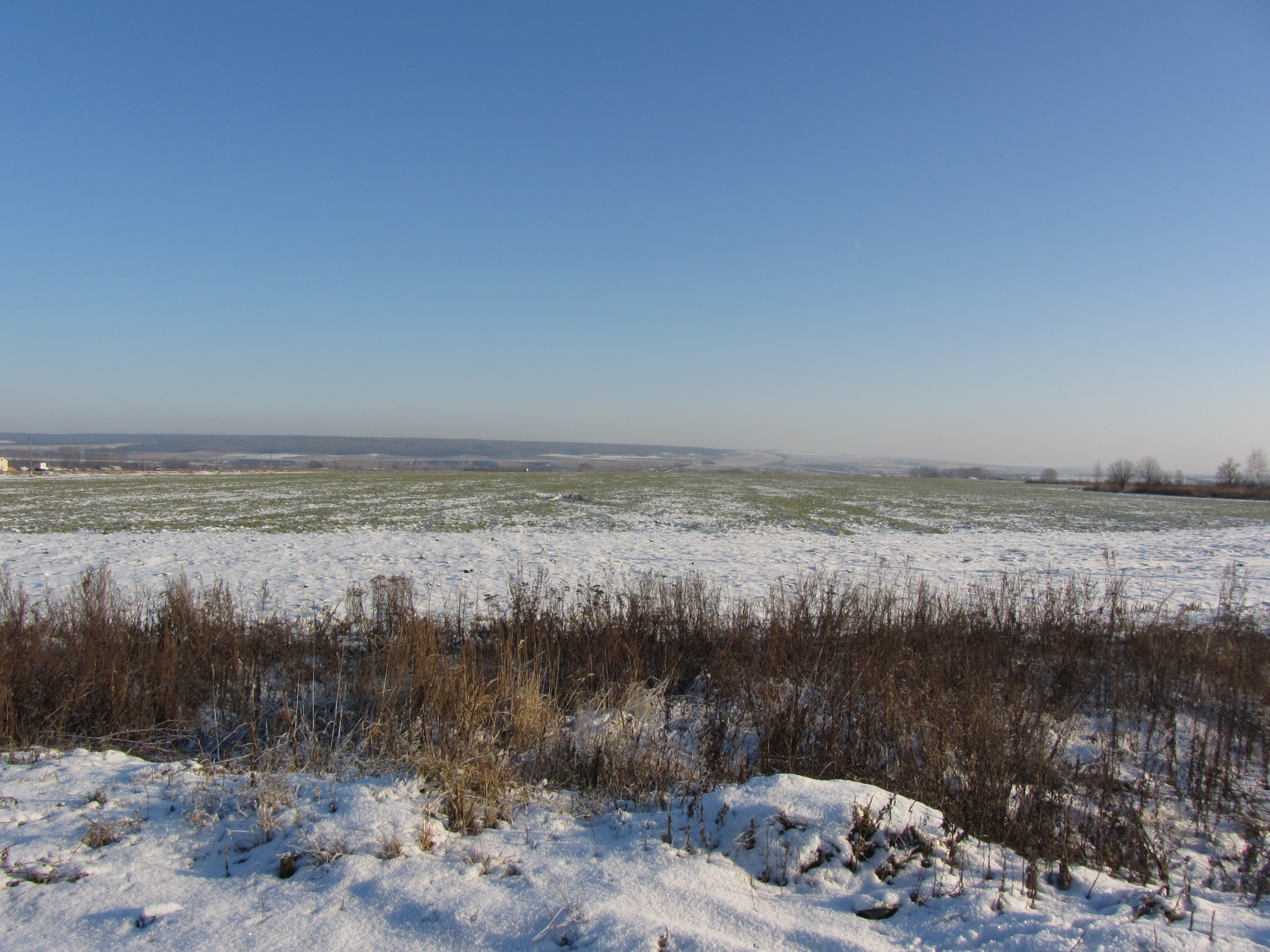
- Winter landscape in Dubyonsky District
- Location of Dubyonsky District in the Republic of Mordovia
- Coordinates: 54°26′N 46°18′E
- Country: Russia
- Federal subject: Republic of Mordovia
- Established: 16 July 1928
- Administrative center: Dubyonki

Area
  - Total: 896.9 km^{2} (346.3 sq mi)

Population (2010 Census)
  - Total: 13,851
  - Density: 15.44/km^{2} (40.00/sq mi)
  - Urban: 0%
  - Rural: 100%

Administrative structure
  - Administrative divisions: 16 Selsoviets
  - Inhabited localities: 29 rural localities

Municipal structure
  - Municipally incorporated as: Dubyonsky Municipal District
  - Municipal divisions: 0 urban settlements, 16 rural settlements
- Time zone: UTC+3 (MSK)
- OKTMO ID: 89616000
- Website: http://dubenki.e-mordovia.ru

Population of Dubyonsky District
- 2010 Census: 13,851
- 2002 Census: 16,366
- 1989 Census: 18,571
- 1979 Census: 20,978

Dubyonsky District (Russian: Дубёнский райо́н; Erzya: Тумобуе, Tumobuje; Moksha: Дубёнкань аймак, Dubönkań ajmak) is an administrative and municipal district (raion), one of the twenty-two in the Republic of Mordovia, Russia. It is located in the east of the republic. The area of the district is 896.9 square kilometers (346.3 sq mi). Its administrative center is the rural locality (a selo) of Dubyonki. As of the 2010 Census, the total population of the district was 13,851, with the population of Dubyonki accounting for 24.0 % of that number.

== Administrative and municipal status ==
Within the framework of administrative divisions, Dubyonsky District is one of the twenty-two in the republic. The district is divided into sixteen selsoviets which comprise twenty-nine rural localities. As a municipal division, the district is incorporated as Dubyonsky Municipal District. Its sixteen selsoviets are incorporated into sixteen rural settlements within the municipal district. The selo of Dubyonki serves as the administrative center of both the administrative and municipal district.

== Notable people ==
- Evgeny Vladimirovich Chetvergov (born 1934), Erzya writer
- Maksim Purkayev (1894 - 1953), Soviet General
