= Bolshebereznikovsky District =

Bolshebereznikovsky District Большеберезниковский район (Russian)
- District

Other transcription(s)
  - Erzya: Покш Килейбуе
  - Moksha: Оцю Келунонь аймак
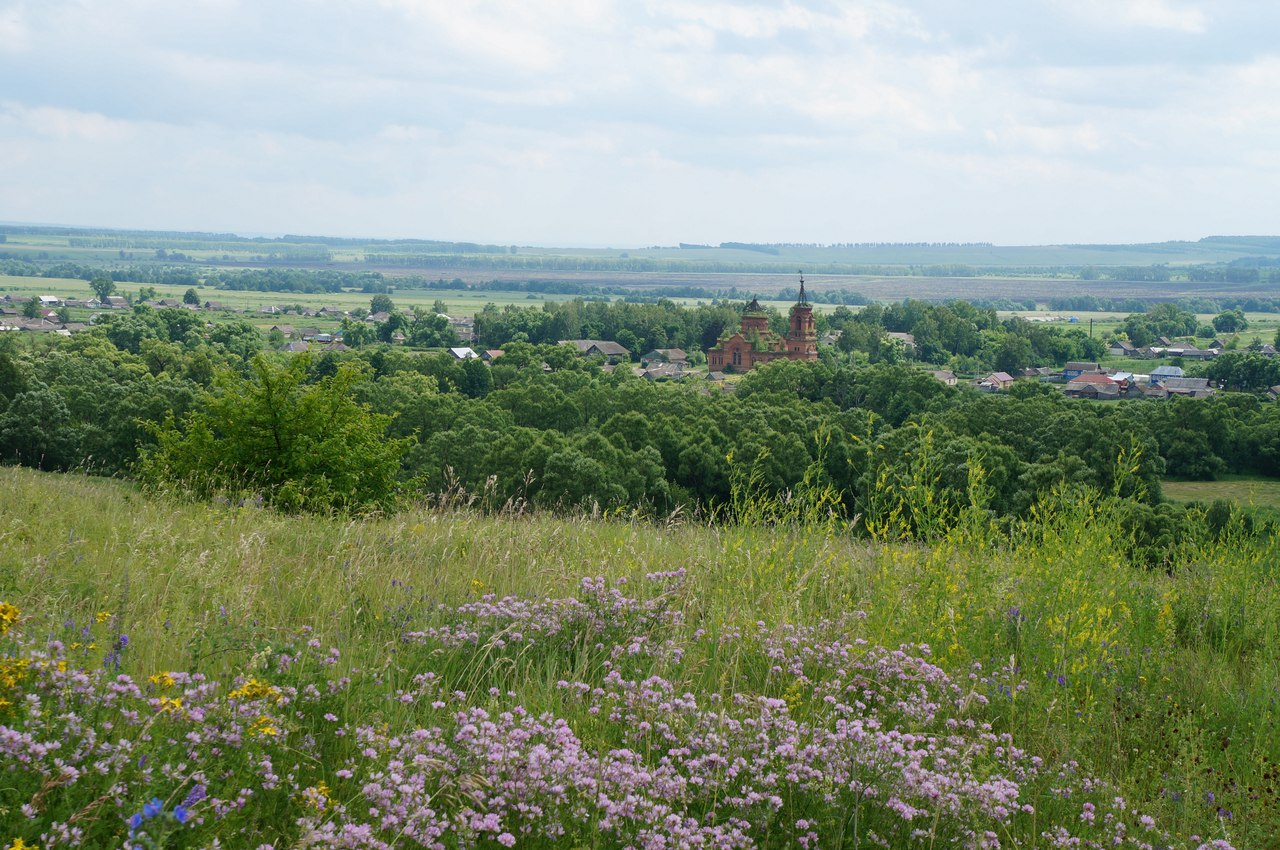
- Village Kosogory in Bolshebereznikovsky District

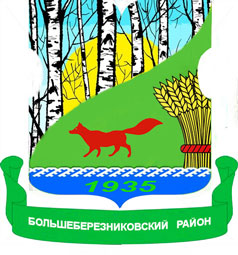
- Coat of arms
- Location of Bolshebereznikovsky District in the Republic of Mordovia
- Coordinates: 54°11′N 45°58′E
- Country: Russia
- Federal subject: Republic of Mordovia
- Established: 1935
- Administrative center: Bolshiye Berezniki

Area
  - Total: 957.7 km^{2} (369.8 sq mi)

Population (2010 Census)
  - Total: 14,072
  - Density: 14.69/km^{2} (38.06/sq mi)
  - Urban: 0%
  - Rural: 100%

Administrative structure
  - Administrative divisions: 15 Selsoviets
  - Inhabited localities: 35 rural localities

Municipal structure
  - Municipally incorporated as: Bolshebereznikovsky Municipal District
  - Municipal divisions: 0 urban settlements, 15 rural settlements
- Time zone: UTC+3 (MSK)
- OKTMO ID: 89610000
- Website: https://bberezniki.gosuslugi.ru/

Population of Bolshebereznikovsky District
- 2010 Census: 14,072
- 2002 Census: 15,584
- 1989 Census: 19,113
- 1979 Census: 24,310

Bolshebereznikovsky District (Russian: Большеберезнико́вский райо́н; Erzya: Покш Килейбуе, Pokš Kilejbuje; Moksha: Оцю Келунонь аймак, Otsü Kelunoń ajmak) is an administrative and municipal district (raion), one of the twenty-two in the Republic of Mordovia, Russia. It is located in the southeast of the republic. The area of the district is 957.7 square kilometers (369.8 sq mi). Its administrative center is the rural locality (a selo) of Bolshiye Berezniki. As of the 2010 Census, the total population of the district was 14,072, with the population of Bolshiye Berezniki accounting for 45.4% of that number.

== Administrative and municipal status ==
Within the framework of administrative divisions, Bolshebereznikovsky District is one of the twenty-two in the republic. The district is divided into fifteen selsoviets which comprise thirty-five rural localities. As a municipal division, the district is incorporated as Bolshebereznikovsky Municipal District. Its fifteen selsoviets are incorporated into fifteen rural settlements within the municipal district. The selo of Bolshiye Berezniki serves as the administrative center of both the administrative and municipal district.

== See also ==
- Degilyovka
