= Lyambirsky District =

Lyambirsky District Лямбирский район (Russian)
- District

Other transcription(s)
  - Erzya: Лямбирьбуе
  - Moksha: Лямбирень аймак
  - Tatar: Ләмберә районы
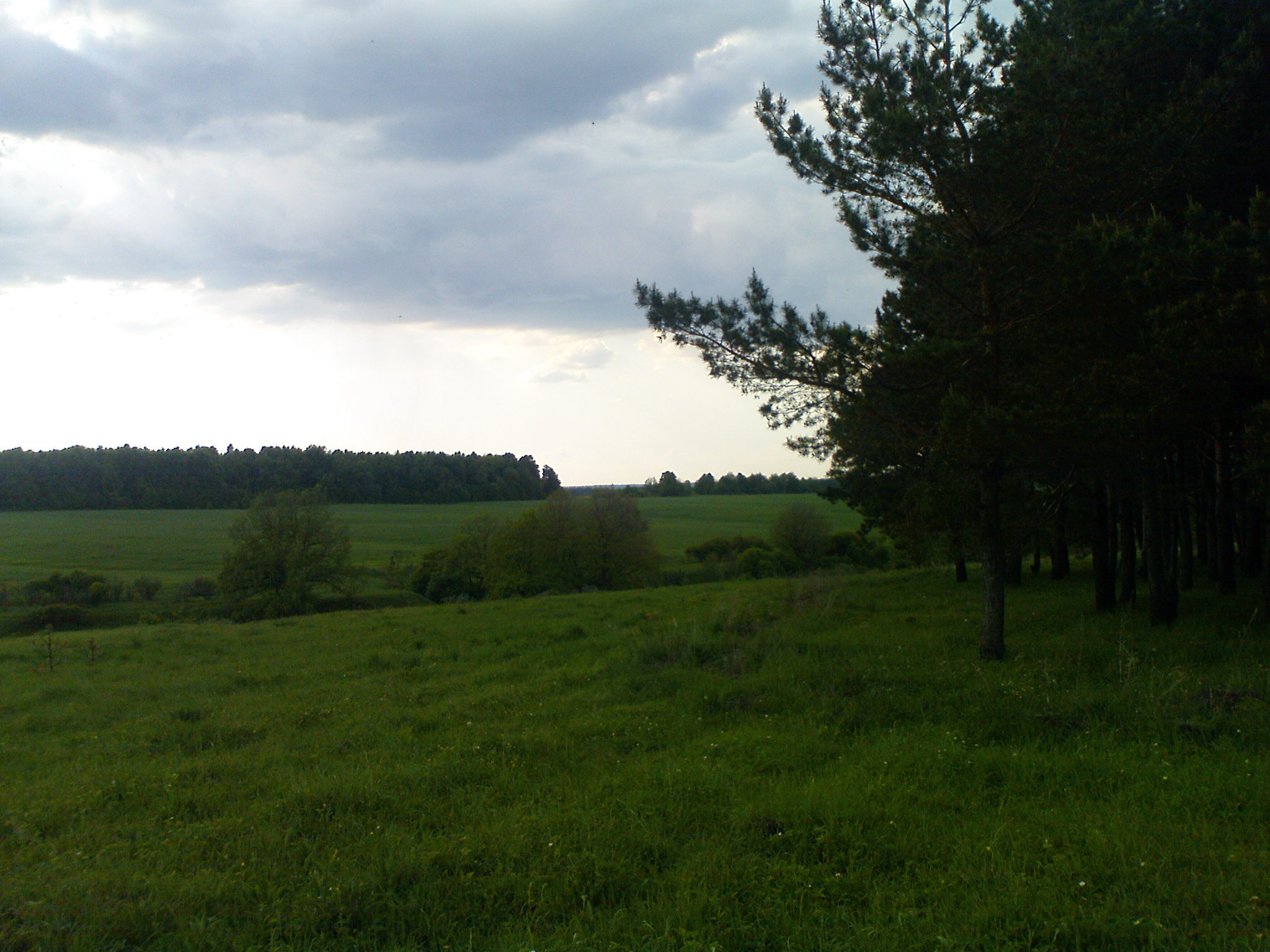
- Landscape in Lyambirsky District

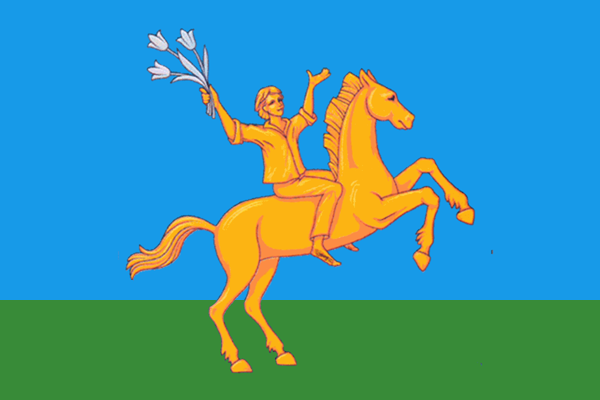
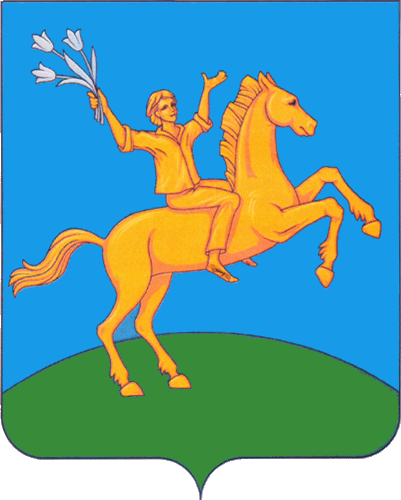
- Flag Coat of arms
- Location of Lyambirsky District in the Republic of Mordovia
- Coordinates: 54°17′N 45°08′E
- Country: Russia
- Federal subject: Republic of Mordovia
- Established: 20 July 1933
- Administrative center: Lyambir

Area
  - Total: 852 km^{2} (329 sq mi)

Population (2010 Census)
  - Total: 34,142
  - Density: 40.1/km^{2} (104/sq mi)
  - Urban: 0%
  - Rural: 100%

Administrative structure
  - Administrative divisions: 16 Selsoviets
  - Inhabited localities: 70 rural localities

Municipal structure
  - Municipally incorporated as: Lyambirsky Municipal District
  - Municipal divisions: 0 urban settlements, 16 rural settlements
- Time zone: UTC+3 (MSK)
- OKTMO ID: 89637000
- Website: https://lyambir-rm.ru/

Population of Lyambirsky District
- 2010 Census: 34,142
- 2002 Census: 33,872
- 1989 Census: 34,661
- 1979 Census: 30,139

Lyambirsky District (Russian: Ля́мбирский райо́н; Erzya: Лямбирьбуе, Lämbiŕbuje; Moksha: Лямбирень аймак, Lämbireń ajmak; Tatar: Ләмберә районы, Lämberä rayonı) is an administrative and municipal district (raion), one of the twenty-two in the Republic of Mordovia, Russia. It is located in the northern and central parts of the republic. The area of the district is 852 square kilometers (329 sq mi). Its administrative center is the rural locality (a selo) of Lyambir. As of the 2010 Census, the total population of the district was 34,142, with the population of Lyambir accounting for 24.8% of that number.

== Administrative and municipal status ==
Within the framework of administrative divisions, Lyambirsky District is one of the twenty-two in the republic. The district is divided into sixteen selsoviets which comprise seventy rural localities. As a municipal division, the district is incorporated as Lyambirsky Municipal District. Its sixteen selsoviets are incorporated into sixteen rural settlements within the municipal district. The selo of Lyambir serves as the administrative center of both the administrative and municipal district.
