= Kochkurovsky District =

Kochkurovsky District Кочкуровский район (Russian)
- District

Other transcription(s)
  - Erzya: Кочкурбуе
  - Moksha: Кочкуровань аймак
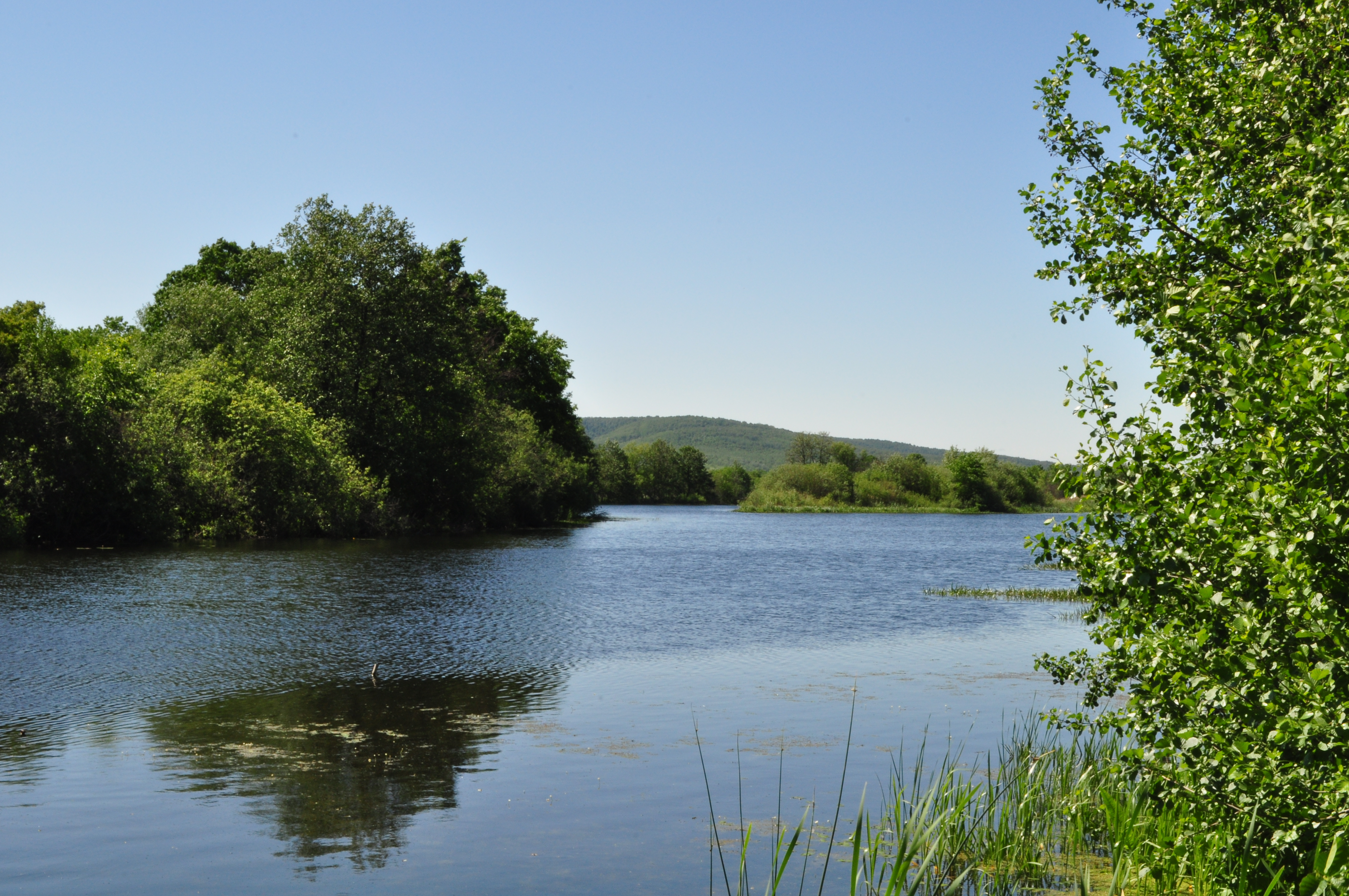
- Lake Chevan Erke, a protected area of Russia in Kochkurovsky District

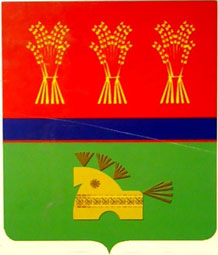
- Coat of arms
- Location of Kochkurovsky District in the Republic of Mordovia
- Coordinates: 54°02′N 45°26′E
- Country: Russia
- Federal subject: Republic of Mordovia
- Established: 16 July 1928
- Administrative center: Kochkurovo

Area
  - Total: 816.46 km^{2} (315.24 sq mi)

Population (2010 Census)
  - Total: 10,794
  - Density: 13.220/km^{2} (34.241/sq mi)
  - Urban: 0%
  - Rural: 100%

Administrative structure
  - Administrative divisions: 11 Selsoviets
  - Inhabited localities: 39 rural localities

Municipal structure
  - Municipally incorporated as: Kochkurovsky Municipal District
  - Municipal divisions: 0 urban settlements, 11 rural settlements
- Time zone: UTC+3 (MSK)
- OKTMO ID: 89631000
- Website: http://kochkurovo.moris.ru

Population of Kochkurovsky District
- 2010 Census: 10,794
- 2002 Census: 11,829
- 1989 Census: 13,863
- 1979 Census: 19,884

Kochkurovsky District (Russian: Кочку́ровский райо́н; Erzya: Кочкурбуе, Kočkurbuje; Moksha: Кочкуровань аймак, Kočkurovań ajmak) is an administrative and municipal district (raion), one of the twenty-two in the Republic of Mordovia, Russia. It is located in the south of the republic. The area of the district is 816.46 square kilometers (315.24 sq mi). Its administrative center is the rural locality (a selo) of Kochkurovo. As of the 2010 Census, the total population of the district was 10,794, with the population of Kochkurovo accounting for 29.6 % of that number.

== Administrative and municipal status ==
Within the framework of administrative divisions, Kochkurovsky District is one of the twenty-two in the republic. The district is divided into eleven selsoviets which comprise thirty-nine rural localities. As a municipal division, the district is incorporated as Kochkurovsky Municipal District. Its eleven selsoviets are incorporated into eleven rural settlements within the municipal district. The selo of Kochkurovo serves as the administrative center of both the administrative and municipal district.

== Notable residents ==
- Olga Kaniskina (born 1985 in Napolnaya Tavla), coach and former race walker
