= Mordovia constituency =

Russian legislative constituency

Mordovia single-member constituency
- Constituency of the Russian State Duma

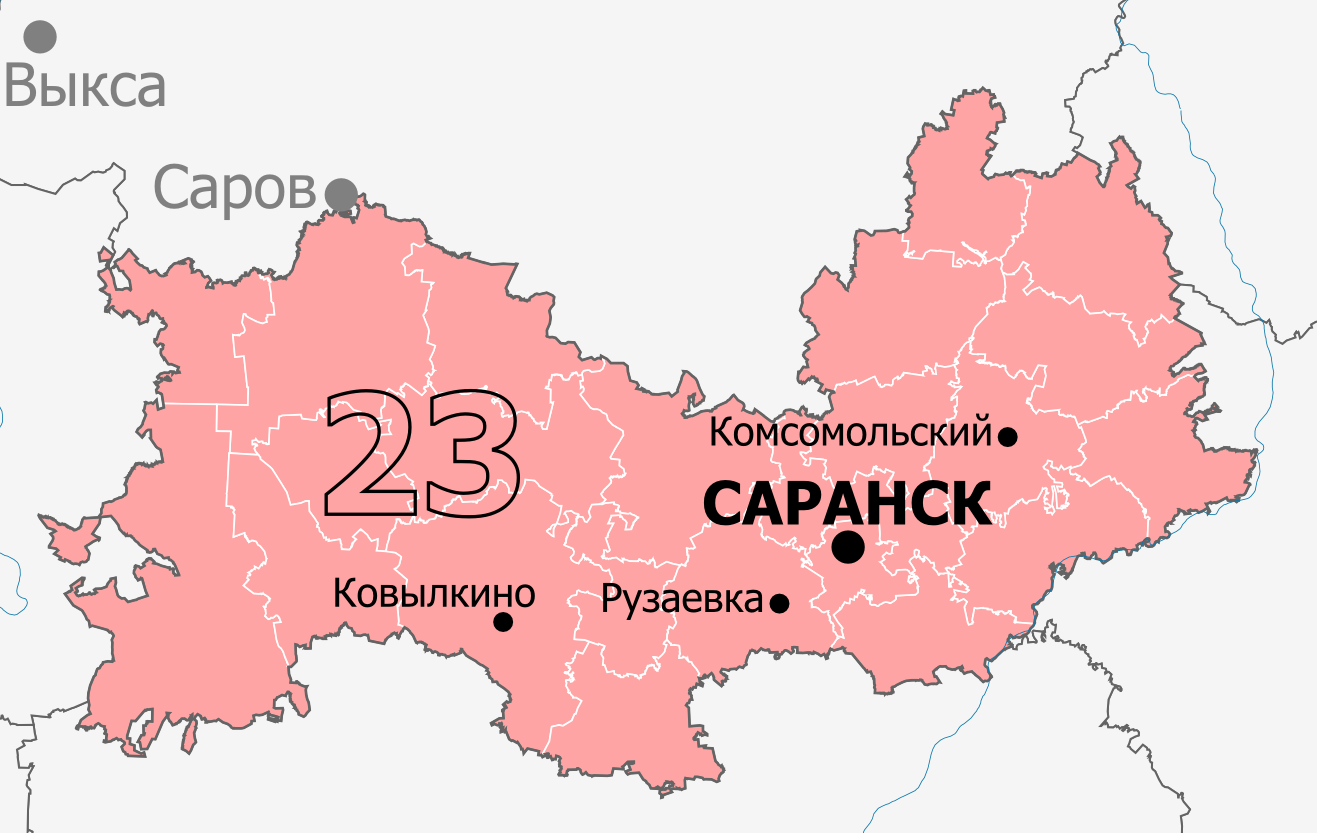
- Deputy: Viktor Kidyayev; United Russia
- Federal subject: Republic of Mordovia
- Districts: Ardatovsky, Atyuryevsky, Atyashevsky, Bolshebereznikovsky, Bolsheignatovsky, Chamzinsky, Dubyonsky, Ichalkovsky, Insarsky, Kadoshkinsky, Kochkurovsky, Kovylkino, Kovylkinsky, Krasnoslobodsky, Lyambirsky, Romodanovsky, Ruzayevka, Ruzayevsky, Saransk, Staroshaygovsky, Temnikovsky, Tengushevsky, Torbeyevsky, Yelnikovsky, Zubovo-Polyansky
- Voters: 552,942 (2026)

The Mordovia constituency (No.28 (Note: No. 20 in 1993–1995 and in 2003–2007, No. 19 in 1995–2003, No.23 in 2016–2026)) is a Russian legislative constituency in Mordovia. The constituency encompasses the entire territory of Mordovia.

The constituency has been represented since 2026 by United Russia deputy Viktor Kidyayev, five-term State Duma member and former municipal head, who won the open seat after defeating one-term United Russia incumbent Yulia Ogloblina in the primary.

== Boundaries ==
1993–2007, 2016–present: Ardatovsky District, Atyuryevsky District, Atyashevsky District, Bolshebereznikovsky District, Bolsheignatovsky District, Chamzinsky District, Dubyonsky District, Ichalkovsky District, Insarsky District, Kadoshkinsky District, Kochkurovsky District, Kovylkino, Kovylkinsky District, Krasnoslobodsky District, Lyambirsky District, Romodanovsky District, Ruzayevka, Ruzayevsky District, Saransk, Staroshaygovsky District, Temnikovsky District, Tengushevsky District, Torbeyevsky District, Yelnikovsky District, Zubovo-Polyansky District
The constituency has been covering the entirety of Mordovia since its initial creation in 1993.

== Members elected ==
| Election | Member | Party |
|---|---|---|
| 1993 | Vladimir Kartashov | Communist Party |
| 1995 | Nikolay Medvedev | Independent |
| 1999 | Viktor Grishin | Fatherland – All Russia |
| 2003 | Viktor Grishin | United Russia |
| 2007 | Proportional representation - no election by constituency | |
| 2011 | Proportional representation - no election by constituency | |
| 2016 | Vitaly Yefimov | United Russia |
| 2021 | Yulia Ogloblina | United Russia |
| 2026 | Viktor Kidyayev | United Russia |

== Election results ==
=== 1993 ===
==== Declared candidates ====
- Anatoly Bolyayev (Independent), Head of Chamzinsky District
- Vladimir Kartashov (CPRF), electric bulb factory serviceman
- Boris Kevbrin (Independent), director of the Moscow University of Cooperation, Saransk branch
- Ivan Kelin (Independent), journalist
- Sergey Serebryakov (YaBL), Council of Ministers of Mordovia staffer
- Nikolay Sharashkin (Independent), journalist

==== Withdrawn candidates ====
- Viktor Skoptsov (APR), Deputy Premier of Mordovia – Minister of Agriculture (1993–present), former First Secretary of the CPSU Mordovian Republican Committee (1990–1991)

==== Results ====
Summary of the 12 December 1993 Russian legislative election in the Mordovia constituency
| Candidate | Party | Votes | % |
|---|---|---|---|
| Vladimir Kartashov | Communist Party | 93,707 | 22.06% |
| Ivan Kelin | Independent | 87,133 | 20.50% |
| Boris Kevbrin | Independent | 66,415 | 15.63% |
| Anatoly Bolyayev | Independent | 39,227 | 9.23% |
| Sergey Serebryakov | Yavlinsky–Boldyrev–Lukin | 35,019 | 8.24% |
| Aleksandr Sharashkin | Independent | 19,826 | 4.67% |
| against all | | 50,624 | 11.92% |
| Total | | 424,799 | 100% |

=== 1995 ===
==== Declared candidates ====
- Anatoly Bolyayev (Independent), Head of Chamzinsky District, 1993 candidate for this seat
- Nikolay Dugushkin (APR), agriculture scientist
- Vasily Guslyannikov (DR-SP), former President of Mordovia (1991–1993)
- Lyudmila Ivanova (Independent), Member of Federation Council (1994–present)
- Vladimir Ivliyev (For the Motherland!), chairman of the People's Patriotic Party of Mordovia
- Vladimir Kartashov (V–N!), incumbent Member of State Duma (1994–present)
- Ivan Kelin (KRO), former journalist, 1993 candidate for this seat
- Stanislav Kholopov (Independent), journalist
- Antonina Krasnova (PPR–ST), union leader
- Aleksey Ladoshkin (PGL), Saransk administration staffer
- Yury Mashkov (Independent)
- Nikolay Medvedev (Independent), Deputy Minister of Russia for the Commonwealth of Independent States (1994–present), former People's Deputy of Russia (1990–1993), 1991 presidential candidate
- Yury Sotov (RPA), transportation executive

==== Results ====
Summary of the 17 December 1995 Russian legislative election in the Mordovia constituency
| Candidate | Party | Votes | % |
|---|---|---|---|
| Nikolay Medvedev | Independent | 146,502 | 31.77% |
| Lyudmila Ivanova | Independent | 108,742 | 23.58% |
| Vladimir Ivliyev | For the Motherland! | 31,210 | 6.77% |
| Vasily Guslyannikov | Democratic Russia and Free Trade Unions | 29,702 | 6.44% |
| Nikolay Dugushkin | Agrarian Party | 21,229 | 4.60% |
| Yury Mashkov | Independent | 15,921 | 3.45% |
| Vladimir Kartashov (incumbent) | Power to the People! | 15,160 | 3.29% |
| Ivan Kelin | Congress of Russian Communities | 14,248 | 3.09% |
| Anatoly Bolyayev | Independent | 9,217 | 2.00% |
| Stanislav Kholopov | Independent | 8,878 | 1.93% |
| Antonina Krasnova | Trade Unions and Industrialists – Union of Labour | 6,182 | 1.34% |
| Aleksey Ladoshkin | Pamfilova–Gurov–Lysenko | 4,661 | 1.01% |
| Yury Sotov | Russian Party of Automobile Owners | 4,205 | 0.91% |
| against all | | 32,547 | 7.06% |
| Total | | 461,146 | 100% |

=== 1999 ===
==== Declared candidates ====
- Nikolay Biryukov (ROS), Head of the Migration Service of Mordovia (1996–present), former Chairman of the Supreme Council of Mordovia (1990–1995), 1991 presidential candidate
- Viktor Grishin (OVR), Deputy Premier of Mordovia – Minister of Economy (1996–present)
- Yevgeny Kosterin (CPRF), Member of State Duma (1994–present)
- Nikolay Makushkin (DN), businessman
- Nikolay Medvedev (Yabloko), incumbent Member of State Duma (1996–present)
- Aleksandr Novikov (Nikolayev–Fyodorov Bloc), retired FSB major general

==== Failed to qualify ====
- Yevgeny Voinov (Independent)
- Oleg Zabrodin (Independent), auto repair shop owner
- Aleksandr Zhirinovsky (LDPR), party official, brother of State Duma member Vladimir Zhirinovsky

==== Did not file ====
- Vladimir Anoshin (Independent)
- Ravil Diveyev (RPP), businessman
- Vasily Guslyannikov (SPS), former President of Mordovia (1991–1993), 1995 DR-ST candidate for this seat
- Vladimir Myshkin (Independent)
- Viktor Samoylov (KTR–zSS), train driver
- Vladimir Shanin (Independent)
- Ivan Yelayev (Independent), lawyer

==== Results ====
Summary of the 19 December 1999 Russian legislative election in the Mordovia constituency
| Candidate | Party | Votes | % |
|---|---|---|---|
| Viktor Grishin | Fatherland – All Russia | 221,643 | 43.66% |
| Yevgeny Kosterin | Communist Party | 105,240 | 20.73% |
| Nikolay Medvedev (incumbent) | Yabloko | 70,720 | 13.93% |
| Aleksandr Novikov | Andrey Nikolayev and Svyatoslav Fyodorov Bloc | 18,576 | 3.66% |
| Nikolay Biryukov | Russian All-People's Union | 17,580 | 3.46% |
| Nikolay Makushkin | Spiritual Heritage | 11,885 | 2.34% |
| against all | | 48,672 | 9.59% |
| Total | | 507,604 | 100% |

=== 2003 ===
==== Declared candidates ====
- Oleg Aleshkin (LDPR), State Duma staffer
- Mikhail Davydkin (Independent), banker
- Viktor Grishin (United Russia), incumbent Member of State Duma (2000–present), Chairman of the Duma Committee on the Federation and Regional Policy (2002–present)
- Sergey Kalashnikov (ORP Rus'), businessman
- Yevgeny Kosterin (CPRF), Member of State Duma (1994–present), 1999 candidate for this seat
- Viktor Nechayev (PVR-RPZh), Deputy Premier of Mordovia (2003–present)
- Aleksandr Polushkin (SPS), Member of State Assembly of the Republic of Mordovia (2000–present)

==== Results ====
Summary of the 7 December 2003 Russian legislative election in the Mordovia constituency
| Candidate | Party | Votes | % |
|---|---|---|---|
| Viktor Grishin (incumbent) | United Russia | 419,484 | 77.51% |
| Yevgeny Kosterin | Communist Party | 43,403 | 8.02% |
| Aleksandr Polushkin | Union of Right Forces | 14,209 | 2.63% |
| Oleg Aleshkin | Liberal Democratic Party | 11,969 | 2.21% |
| Viktor Nechayev | Party of Russia's Rebirth-Russian Party of Life | 5,503 | 1.02% |
| Sergey Kalashnikov | United Russian Party Rus' | 3,843 | 0.71% |
| Mikhail Davydkin | Independent | 3,731 | 0.69% |
| against all | | 30,270 | 5.59% |
| Total | | 542,057 | 100% |

=== 2016 ===
==== Declared candidates ====
- Timur Geraslkin (A Just Russia), Member of Spasskoye Council of Deputies (2014–present), associate professor
- Vladimir Gridin (Yabloko), chairman of the party regional office
- Yulia Ivanova (Party of Growth), Member of State Assembly of the Republic of Mordovia (2011–present), businesswoman
- Larisa Konnova (Patriots of Russia), chairwoman of the party regional office
- Dmitry Kuzyakin (CPRF), former Member of Shchukino District Council of Deputies (2004–2008), medical businessman
- Sergey Sorokin (Rodina), Deputy Chairman of the State Assembly of the Republic of Mordovia (2011–present), Member of the State Assembly (1995–present)
- Yevgeny Tyurin (LDPR), aide to State Duma member Sergey Marinin, perennial candidate
- Vitaly Yefimov (United Russia), Member of State Duma (2011–present)
- Armen Yeranosyan (CPCR), perennial candidate

==== Failed to qualify ====
- Ivan Yelayev (Independent), law firm director, 1999 candidate for this seat

==== Declined ====
- Natalia Andryushechkina (United Russia), Member of State Assembly of the Republic of Mordovia (2011–present), student union leader (lost the primary)
- Pyotr Avtayev (United Russia), former Deputy Premier of Mordovia (1993–2001), gas executive (lost the primary)
- Sergey Chindyaskin (United Russia), Member of State Duma (2011–present) (lost the primary, ran on the party list)
- Sergey Kulkov (United Russia), Member of State Assembly of the Republic of Mordovia (2011–present), retired Russian Army colonel (lost the primary)
- Denis Nizhegorodov (United Russia), 2004 Olympic Silver medalist walker (lost the primary)
- Nadezhda Shkolkina (United Russia), Member of State Duma (2011–present) (lost the primary, ran on the party list)
- Aleksandr Vorobyov (United Russia), Member of State Assembly of the Republic of Mordovia (1995–present), PhosAgro executive (lost the primary, ran on the party list)

==== Results ====
Summary of the 18 September 2016 Russian legislative election in the Mordovia constituency
| Candidate | Party | Votes | % |
|---|---|---|---|
| Vitaly Yefimov | United Russia | 426,544 | 81.84% |
| Yevgeny Tyurin | Liberal Democratic Party | 26,365 | 5.06% |
| Dmitry Kuzyakin | Communist Party | 24,560 | 4.71% |
| Timur Geraskin | A Just Russia | 18,433 | 3.54% |
| Armen Yeranosyan | Communists of Russia | 5,070 | 0.97% |
| Sergey Sorokin | Rodina | 4,874 | 0.94% |
| Yulia Ivanova | Party of Growth | 4,346 | 0.83% |
| Larisa Konnova | Patriots of Russia | 3,474 | 0.67% |
| Vladimir Gridin | Yabloko | 3,320 | 0.64% |
| Total | | 521,181 | 100% |

=== 2021 ===
==== Declared candidates ====
- Sergey Belov (RPPSS), electrician
- Timur Geraskin (SR–ZP), Member of Saransk Council of Deputies (2016–present), lecturer, 2016 candidate for this seat, 2017 head candidate
- Dmitry Kuzyakin (CPRF), Member of State Duma (2021–present), 2016 candidate for this seat, 2017 and 2021 head candidate
- Yulia Ogloblina (United Russia), community activist
- Aleksandr Toporkov (CPCR), perennial candidate
- Yevgeny Tyurin (LDPR), Member of State Assembly of the Republic of Mordovia (2016–present), 2016 candidate for this seat, 2017 and 2021 head candidate
- Maksim Zinin (New People), undergraduate student

==== Declined ====
- Vitaly Yefimov (United Russia), incumbent Member of State Duma (2011–present) (ran on the party list)

==== Results ====
Summary of the 17-19 September 2021 Russian legislative election in the Mordovia constituency
| Candidate | Party | Votes | % |
|---|---|---|---|
| Yulia Ogloblina | United Russia | 220,015 | 57.44% |
| Dmitry Kuzyakin | Communist Party | 51,526 | 13.45% |
| Yevgeny Tyurin | Liberal Democratic Party | 33,235 | 8.68% |
| Timur Geraskin | A Just Russia — For Truth | 24,137 | 6.30% |
| Sergey Belov | Party of Pensioners | 15,699 | 4.10% |
| Maksim Zinin | New People | 15,312 | 4.00% |
| Aleksandr Toporkov | Communists of Russia | 13,049 | 3.41% |
| Total | | 383,058 | 100% |

=== 2026 ===
==== Declared candidates ====
- Timur Geraskin (A Just Russia), Member of State Assembly of the Republic of Mordovia (2021–present), 2016 and 2021 candidate for this seat, 2017 and 2026 head candidate
- Viktor Kidyayev (United Russia), Member of State Duma (2009–present)
- Dmitry Kuzyakin (CPRF), Member of State Assembly of the Republic of Mordovia (2021–present), former Member of State Duma (2021), 2016 and 2021 candidate for this seat, 2017 and 2021 head candidate
- Dmitry Masserov (The Greens), Mordovian State University department of ecology and natural resources head, 2026 head candidate
- Vladislav Tulayev (New People), businessman, 2026 head candidate
- Yevgeny Tyurin (LDPR), Deputy Chairman of the State Assembly of the Republic of Mordovia (2021–present), Member of the State Assembly (2016–present), 2016 and 2021 candidate for this seat, 2017, 2021 and 2026 head candidate

==== Declined ====
- Yulia Ogloblina (United Russia), incumbent Member of State Duma (2021–present) (lost the primary)
- Georgy Vesnushkin (United Russia), Member of State Assembly of the Republic of Mordovia (2021–present), oncology physician (lost the primary)

==== Results ====
Summary of the 18-20 September 2026 Russian legislative election in the Mordovia constituency
| Candidate | Party | Votes | % |
|---|---|---|---|
| Viktor Kidyayev | United Russia | 281,032 | 68.20% |
| Dmitry Kuzyakin | Communist Party | 38,292 | 9.29% |
| Yevgeny Tyurin | Liberal Democratic Party | 35,620 | 8.64% |
| Vladislav Tulayev | New People | 22,283 | 5.41% |
| Timur Geraskin | A Just Russia | 20,993 | 5.09% |
| Dmitry Masserov | The Greens | 8,904 | 2.16% |
| Total | | 412,100 | 100% |
