= 2026 Mordovian head election =

Regional legislative election in Russia

- 18–20 September 2026
- Turnout: 74.60% ▲9.80 pp
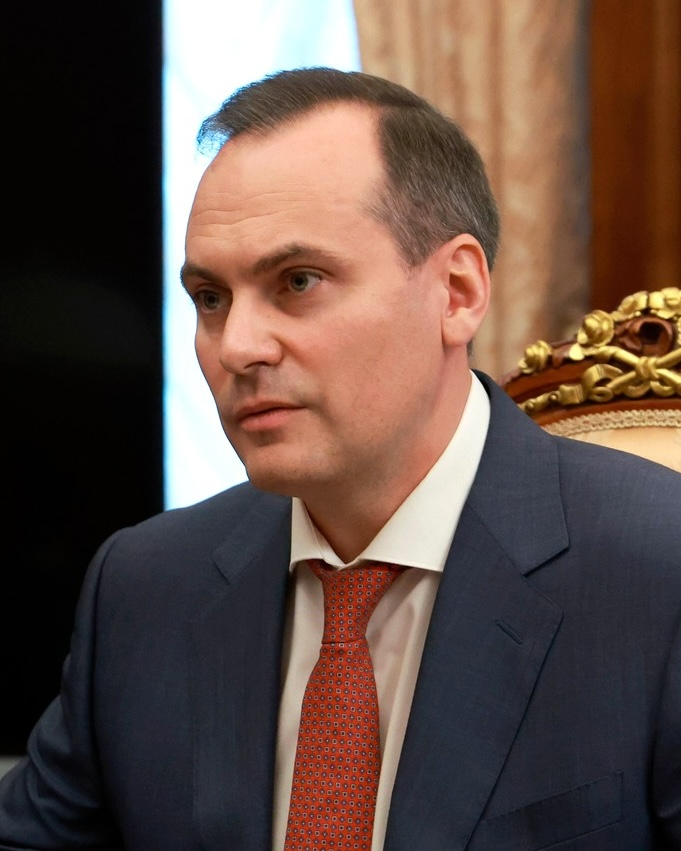
		CPRF	LDPR
Candidate	Artyom Zdunov	Aleksandr Aleksandrov	Yevgeny Tyurin
Party	United Russia	CPRF	LDPR
Popular vote	322,654	32,198	30,740
Percentage	77.99%	7.78%	7.43%
Head before election
Artyom Zdunov
United Russia
Head-elect
Artyom Zdunov
United Russia
Senator before election
Sergey Kislyak
Independent
Senator after election
Andrey Kelin
Independent

The 2026 Republic of Mordovia head election took place on 18–20 September 2026, on common election day, to elect the Head of the Republic of Mordovia, coinciding with the 2026 Mordovian legislative election and the 2026 Russian legislative election. Incumbent Head Artyom Zdunov won re-election for a second term in office.

== Background ==
In November 2020 Vladimir Volkov, who served as Head of the Republic of Mordovia since 2012, announced resignation in the middle of his second term. Reasons cited for Volkov's early resignations were his apathetic style of governance, rising state debt, health issues and public fatigue as Volkov has been a fixture in regional politics, previously serving as Prime Minister of Mordovia in 1995–2012. President of Russia Vladimir Putin appointed Prime Minister of Dagestan Artyom Zdunov, an ethnic Erzya, acting Head of the Republic of Mordovia following Volkov's resignation. Zdunov faced little opposition in a region long considered an "electoral sultanate" for United Russia and easily won an election for a full term in 2021 with 78.21% of the vote, while the party simultaneously won 42 seats (out of 48) in the State Assembly of the Republic of Mordovia.

Zdunov's term in office was rather uneventful if somewhat successful with him being mostly credited for improving the republic's chronically indebted budget, fighting corruption in the regional government and solving demographic problems. Major shifts occurred in the regional elite as Zdunov largely replaced associates close to former head Nikolay Merkushkin, who effectively controlled politics and economy of Mordovia since 1995, with officials from Tatarstan and Dagestan, where Zdunov had built his administrative career.

On May 4, 2026, Zdunov met with President Putin and asked his endorsement for the upcoming head election, which Putin agreed to.

== Candidates ==
In Mordovia candidates for Head of the Republic of Mordovia can be nominated only by registered political parties. Candidate for Head of the Republic of Mordovia should be a Russian citizen and at least 30 years old. Candidates for Head of the Republic of Mordovia should not have a foreign citizenship or residence permit. Each candidate in order to be registered is required to collect at least 7% of signatures of municipal deputies and heads of municipalities. Also head candidates present 3 candidacies to the Federation Council and election winner later appoints one of the presented candidates.

=== Declared ===
Candidate name, political party	Occupation	Status	Ref.
Aleksandr Aleksandrov; Communist Party	Member of Saransk Council of Deputies (2021–present); Aide to State Duma member Irina Filatova	Registered	
Timur Geraskin; A Just Russia	Member of State Assembly of the Republic of Mordovia (2021–present); 2017 head candidate	Registered	
Dmitry Masserov; The Greens	Mordovian State University department of ecology and natural resources head	Registered	
Yevgeny Tyurin; Liberal Democratic Party	Deputy Chairman of the State Assembly of the Republic of Mordovia (2021–present); Member of the State Assembly (2016–present); 2017 and 2021 head candidate	Registered	
Artyom Zdunov; United Russia	Incumbent Head of the Republic of Mordovia (2020–present)	Registered	
Vladislav Tulayev; New People	Construction businessman	Withdrew after registration	

=== Candidates for Federation Council ===
Incumbent Senator Sergey Kislyak (Independent) was not renominated.

Head candidate, political party	Candidates for Federation Council	Status
Artyom Zdunov; United Russia	* Sergey Ageyev, Member of State Assembly of the Republic of Mordovia (2021–present), glass manufacturing executive * Anatoly Gulin, former Chief Federal Inspector for Mordovia (2023–2026) * Andrey Kelin, former Ambassador of Russia to the United Kingdom (2019–2026)	Registered

== Finances ==
All sums are in rubles.

Financial Report	Source	Aleksandrov	Geraskin	Masserov	Tulayev	Tyurin	Zdunov
First		50,000	311,100	50,000	47,000	49,300	20,000,000
Final		TBD	TBD	TBD	57,000	49,300	40,000,000

== Results ==
Summary of the 18–20 September 2026 Mordovian head election results
Candidate	Party	Votes	%
Artyom Zdunov (incumbent)	United Russia	322,654	77.99
Aleksandr Aleksandrov	Communist Party	32,198	7.78
Yevgeny Tyurin	Liberal Democratic Party	30,740	7.43
Timur Geraskin	A Just Russia	15,932	3.85
Dmitry Masserov	The Greens	8,614	2.08
Valid votes		410,138	99.13
Blank ballots		3,600	0.87
Total		413,740	100.00
Turnout		413,740	74.60
Registered voters		554,633	100.00

Head Zdunov appointed former Ambassador of Russia to the United Kingdom Andrey Kelin (Independent) to the Federation Council, replacing incumbent Senator Sergey Kislyak (Independent).

== See also ==
- 2026 Russian regional elections
