= 2026 Mordovian legislative election =

Regional legislative election in Russia

- 18–20 September 2026

All 48 seats in the State Assembly 25 seats needed for a majority
- Turnout: 73.96% ▲9.34 pp
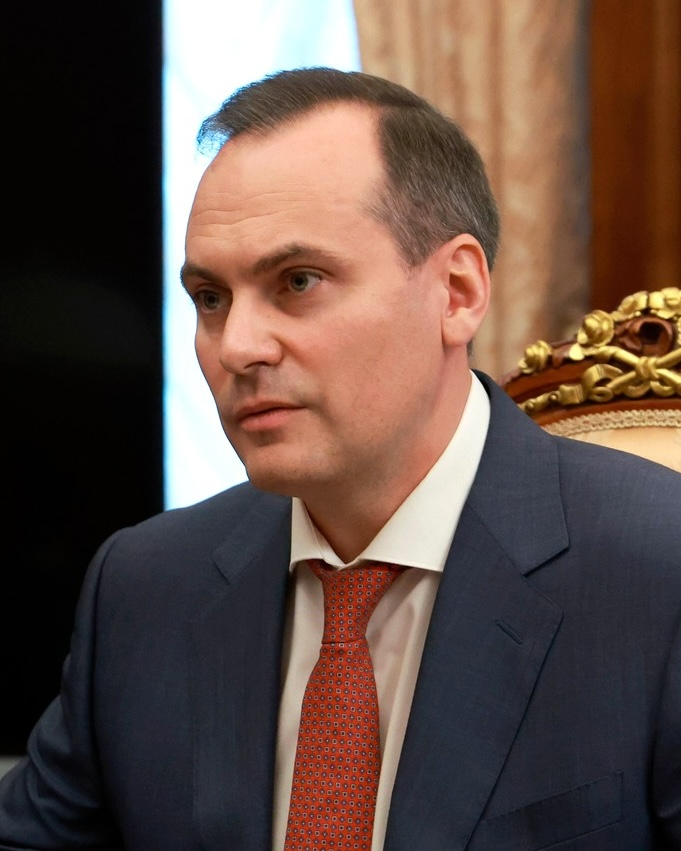

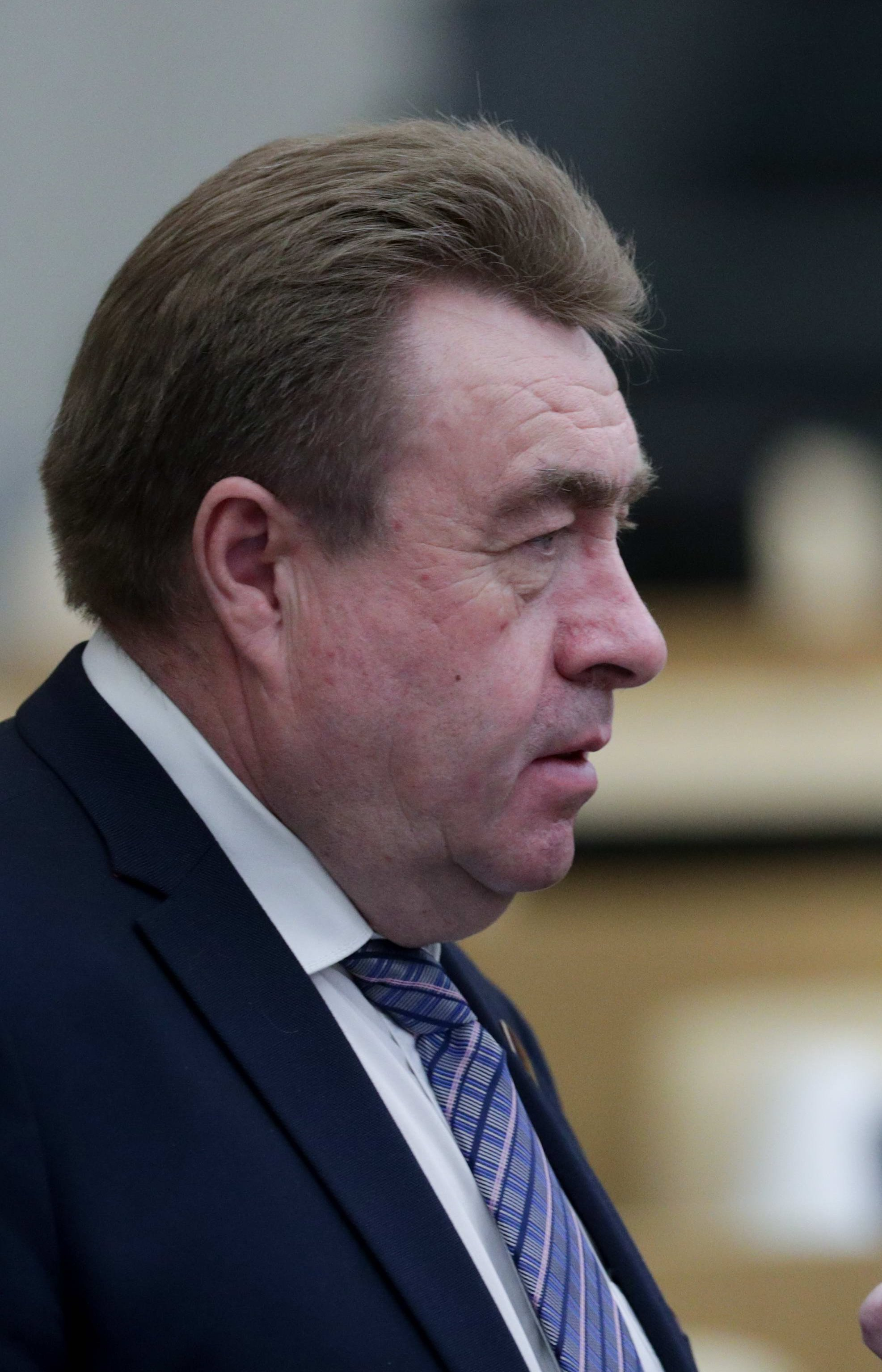

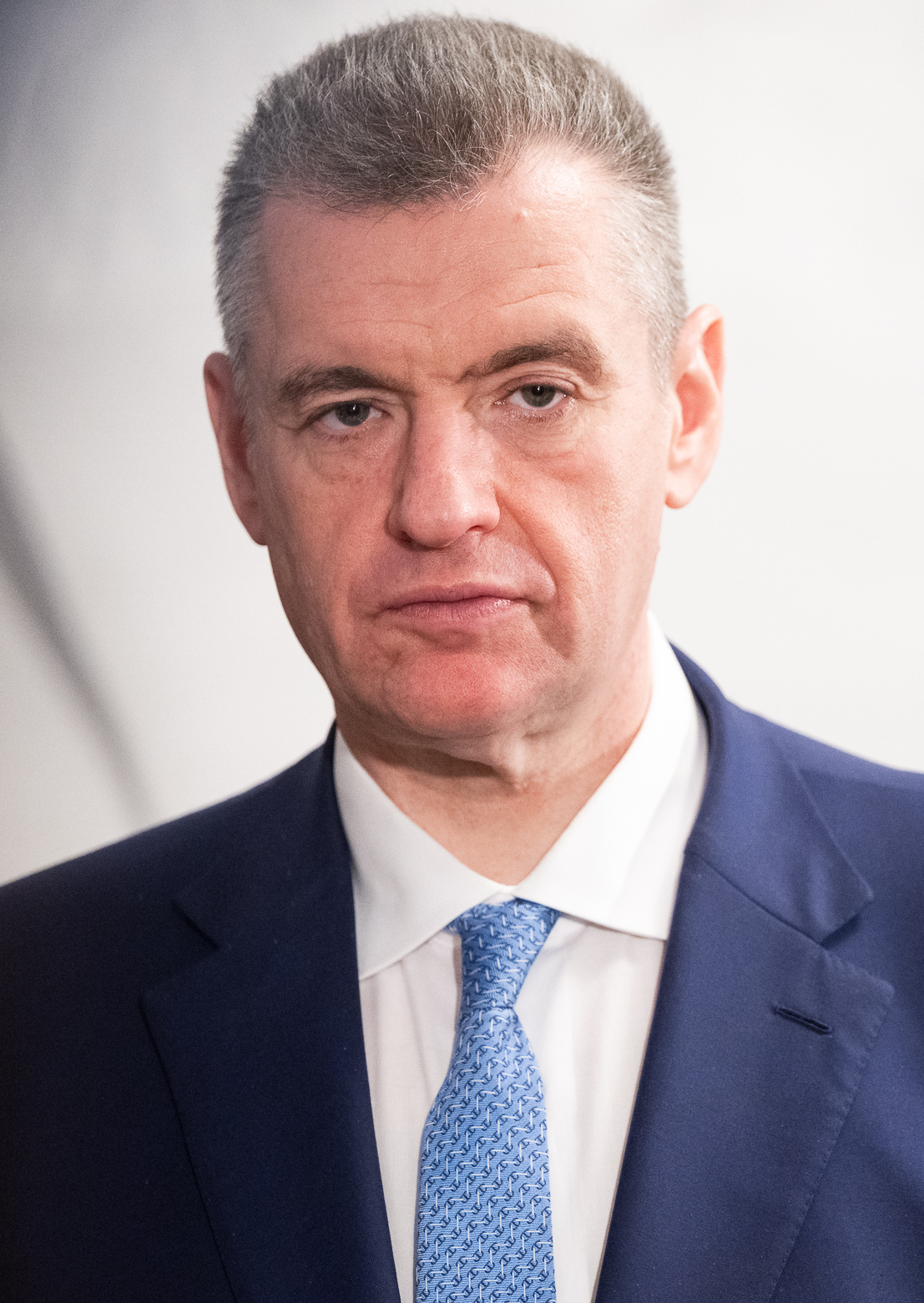
	Majority party	Minority party	Third party
Candidate	Artyom Zdunov	Dmitry Kuzyakin	Leonid Slutsky
Party	United Russia	CPRF	LDPR
Last election	67.21%, 42 seats	14.19%, 3 seats	9.85%, 2 seats
Seats won	44	2	2
Seat change	▲2	▼1	Steady
Popular vote	297,967	38,908	34,963
Percentage	72.63%	9.48%	8.52%
Swing	▲5.42 pp	▼4.71 pp	▼1.33 pp
	Fourth party	Fifth party
	NL	SR
Candidate	Darya Kislitsyna	Timur Geraskin
Party	New People	A Just Russia
Last election	Did not participate	6.77%, 1 seat
Seats won	0	0
Seat change	Did not participate	▼1
Popular vote	18,204	15,979
Percentage	4.44%	3.89%
Swing	Did not participate	▼2.88 pp
Chairman before election
Vladimir Chibirkin
United Russia
Elected Chairman
Vladimir Chibirkin
United Russia
Senator before election
Peter Tultaev
United Russia
Senator after election
Olga Makedonskaya
United Russia

The 2026 State Assembly of the Republic of Mordovia election took place on 18–20 September 2026, on common election day, coinciding with the 2026 Mordovian head election and the 2026 Russian legislative election. All 48 seats in the State Assembly were up for re-election.

United Russia slightly increased its overwhelming majority in the State Assembly, winning 72.6% of the vote and all 24 single-mandate constituencies. Communist Party of the Russian Federation lost one seat, while A Just Russia failed to cross the 5% threshold and lost representation in the State Assembly.

== Electoral system ==
Under current election laws, the State Assembly is elected for a term of five years, with parallel voting. 24 seats are elected by party-list proportional representation with a 5% electoral threshold, with the other half elected in 24 single-member constituencies by first-past-the-post voting. Seats in the proportional part are allocated using the Imperiali quota, modified to ensure that every party list, which passes the threshold, receives at least one mandate.

== Candidates ==
=== Party lists ===
To register regional lists of candidates, parties need to collect 0.5% of signatures of all registered voters in Mordovia.

The following parties were relieved from the necessity to collect signatures:

- United Russia
- Communist Party of the Russian Federation
- Liberal Democratic Party of Russia
- A Just Russia
- New People

№	Party	Republic-wide list	Candidates	Territorial groups	Status
1	Communist Party	Dmitry Kuzyakin • Pavel Feofanov • Sergey Pivkin	79	24	Registered
2	United Russia	Artyom Zdunov • Sergey Abedkin • Lyudmila Adushkina	119	24	Registered
3	Liberal Democratic Party	Leonid Slutsky • Yevgeny Tyurin	104	24	Registered
4	New People	Darya Kislitsyna • Vladislav Tulayev • Yekaterina Koltamenkova	59	14	Registered
5	A Just Russia	Timur Geraskin • Aleksandr Kochin • Artyom Poverinov	104	23	Registered

New People took part in the Mordovian legislative election for the first time.

=== Single-mandate constituencies ===
24 single-mandate constituencies were formed in Mordovia. To register candidates in single-mandate constituencies need to collect 3% of signatures of registered voters in the constituency.

Number of candidates in single-mandate constituencies
Party	Candidates	
Party	Nominated	Registered
United Russia	24	24
Communist Party	25	22
Liberal Democratic Party	24	22
A Just Russia	22	21
New People	12	11
Independent	1	0
Total	108	100

== Results ==
=== Results by party lists ===
Summary of the 18–20 September 2026 State Assembly of the Republic of Mordovia election results
Party	Party list					Constituency		Total	
Party	Votes	%	±pp	Seats	+/–	Seats	+/–	Seats	+/–
United Russia	297,967	72.63	▲5.42	20	▲2	24	Steady	44	▲2
Communist Party	38,908	9.48	▼4.71	2	▼1	0	Steady	2	▼1
Liberal Democratic Party	34,963	8.52	▼1.33	2	Steady	0	Steady	2	Steady
New People	18,204	4.44	New	0	New	0	New	0	New
A Just Russia	15,979	3.89	▼2.88	0	▼1	0	Steady	0	▼1
Invalid ballots	4,231	1.03	▼0.94	—	—	—	—	—	—
Total	410,255	100.00	—	24	Steady	24	Steady	48	Steady
Turnout	410,255	73.96	▲9.34	—	—	—	—	—	—
Registered voters	554,729	100.00	—	—	—	—	—	—	—

Vladimir Chibirkin (United Russia) was re-elected as Chairman of the State Council, while Federal Medical-Biological Agency Centre for Blood director Olga Makedonskaya (United Russia) was appointed to the Federation Council, replacing incumbent Senator Peter Tultaev (United Russia).

=== Results in single-member constituencies ===
==== District 1 ====
Summary of the 18–20 September 2026 State Assembly of the Republic of Mordovia election in Ardatovsko-Bolsheignatovsky constituency No.1
Candidate	Party	Votes	%
Vladimir Kabayev (incumbent)	United Russia	15,337	87.46%
Zinaida Gorokhova	Communist Party	865	4.93%
Aleksey Svyatkin	Liberal Democratic Party	712	4.06%
Vitaly Burov	New People	276	1.57%
Mikhail Pershin	A Just Russia	250	1.43%
Total		17,537	100%

==== District 2 ====
Summary of the 18–20 September 2026 State Assembly of the Republic of Mordovia election in Atyuryevsko-Torbeyevsky constituency No.2
Candidate	Party	Votes	%
Mikhail Grechishnikov (incumbent)	United Russia	13,965	84.08%
Nikolay Sharonov	Communist Party	1,147	6.91%
Vadim Korolev	Liberal Democratic Party	954	5.74%
Vladimir Shanin	A Just Russia	509	3.06%
Total		16,609	100%

==== District 3 ====
Summary of the 18–20 September 2026 State Assembly of the Republic of Mordovia election in Atyashevsko-Dubensky constituency No.3
Candidate	Party	Votes	%
Mikhail Podmarev (incumbent)	United Russia	15,140	79.18%
Aleksandr Syreskin	A Just Russia	1,338	7.00%
Valentina Plotnikova	Communist Party	1,193	6.24%
Aleksandr Sukhankin	New People	711	3.72%
Sergey Puzhayev	Liberal Democratic Party	612	3.20%
Total		19,121	100%

==== District 4 ====
Summary of the 18–20 September 2026 State Assembly of the Republic of Mordovia election in Bolshebereznikovsko-Kochkurovsky constituency No.4
Candidate	Party	Votes	%
Andrey Fatkin	United Russia	14,183	74.61%
Igor Yushkov	Liberal Democratic Party	2,011	10.58%
Levon Kirakosyan	Communist Party	1,806	9.50%
Yury Semenyuk	A Just Russia	920	4.84%
Total		19,009	100%

==== District 5 ====
Summary of the 18–20 September 2026 State Assembly of the Republic of Mordovia election in Veselovsky constituency No.5
Candidate	Party	Votes	%
Nikolay Chalov	United Russia	8,522	59.39%
Sergey Loganov	Communist Party	2,294	15.99%
Olga Gostyayeva	New People	1,881	13.11%
Sergey Runkov	A Just Russia	1,532	10.68%
Total		14,350	100%

==== District 6 ====
Summary of the 18–20 September 2026 State Assembly of the Republic of Mordovia election in Yelnikovsko-Temnikovsko-Tengushevsky constituency No.6
Candidate	Party	Votes	%
Kuzma Samolkin	United Russia	17,420	88.19%
Sergey Savonin	Liberal Democratic Party	2,278	11.53%
Total		19,753	100%

==== District 7 ====
Summary of the 18–20 September 2026 State Assembly of the Republic of Mordovia election in Zheleznodorozhny constituency No.7
Candidate	Party	Votes	%
Sergey Ageyev (incumbent)	United Russia	12,347	71.46%
Aleksandr Golikov	Communist Party	2,079	12.03%
Andrey Yermakov	Liberal Democratic Party	1,100	6.37%
Natalya Zhuravleva	A Just Russia	848	4.91%
Ivan Mashkin	New People	713	4.13%
Total		17,279	100%

==== District 8 ====
Summary of the 18–20 September 2026 State Assembly of the Republic of Mordovia election in Zavodskoy constituency No.8
Candidate	Party	Votes	%
Aleksey Fedkov	United Russia	10,427	64.78%
Vasily Polynov	Communist Party	2,818	17.51%
Irina Koroleva	Liberal Democratic Party	1,104	6.86%
Aleksandr Razumeyko	New People	759	4.72%
Anatoly Boltenkov	A Just Russia	755	4.69%
Total		16,097	100%

==== District 9 ====
Summary of the 18–20 September 2026 State Assembly of the Republic of Mordovia election in Zarechny constituency No.9
Candidate	Party	Votes	%
Peter Tultaev	United Russia	7,968	60.98%
Anatoly Vakhterov	Liberal Democratic Party	2,074	15.87%
Yury Kuznetsov	Communist Party	1,651	12.63%
Anna Kondrashova	A Just Russia	1,172	8.97%
Total		13,067	100%

==== District 10 ====
Summary of the 18–20 September 2026 State Assembly of the Republic of Mordovia election in Zubovo-Polyansky constituency No.10
Candidate	Party	Votes	%
Valery Alyokhin	United Russia	18,904	82.53%
Yevgeny Arkhipov	Communist Party	1,646	7.19%
Diana Katkova	Liberal Democratic Party	1,447	6.32%
Artyom Poverinov	A Just Russia	863	3.77%
Total		22,905	100%

==== District 11 ====
Summary of the 18–20 September 2026 State Assembly of the Republic of Mordovia election in Insarsko-Kadoshkinsko-Staroshaygovsky constituency No.11
Candidate	Party	Votes	%
Vasily Bataykin	United Russia	15,608	86.06%
Valentina Morozkina	Communist Party	1,363	7.52%
Nikolay Khramov	Liberal Democratic Party	1,065	5.87%
Total		18,136	100%

==== District 12 ====
Summary of the 18–20 September 2026 State Assembly of the Republic of Mordovia election in Ichalkovsko-Romodanovsky constituency No.12
Candidate	Party	Votes	%
Aleksandr Atlasov (incumbent)	United Russia	20,316	89.32%
Viktor Kuvshinov	Communist Party	809	3.56%
Yelena Markina	Liberal Democratic Party	633	2.78%
Rinat Myaksinyayev	New People	510	2.24%
Oleg Shigayev	A Just Russia	340	1.49%
Total		22,745	100%

==== District 13 ====
Summary of the 18–20 September 2026 State Assembly of the Republic of Mordovia election in Kovalenkovsky constituency No.13
Candidate	Party	Votes	%
Sergey Ladyayev	United Russia	7,743	54.20%
Aleksandr Kaprinsky	Communist Party	3,753	26.27%
Aleksey Voronin	A Just Russia	2,474	17.32%
Total		14,285	100%

==== District 14 ====
Summary of the 18–20 September 2026 State Assembly of the Republic of Mordovia election in Kovylkinsky constituency No.14
Candidate	Party	Votes	%
Valery Makeyev	United Russia	13,940	81.47%
Andrey Volgutov	Liberal Democratic Party	1,867	10.91%
Aleksandr Shepaksov	A Just Russia	1,058	6.18%
Total		17,110	100%

==== District 15 ====
Summary of the 18–20 September 2026 State Assembly of the Republic of Mordovia election in Krasnoslobodsky constituency No.15
Candidate	Party	Votes	%
Anatoly Gulin	United Russia	11,996	75.05%
Sergey Pivkin	Communist Party	2,336	14.62%
Tatyana Vidyashina	Liberal Democratic Party	854	5.34%
Vladimir Zotkin	A Just Russia	577	3.61%
Total		15,983	100%

==== District 16 ====
Summary of the 18–20 September 2026 State Assembly of the Republic of Mordovia election in Lyambirsky constituency No.16
Candidate	Party	Votes	%
Natalya Makarova	United Russia	15,730	78.18%
Mars Abuzyarov	Liberal Democratic Party	1,614	8.02%
Viktor Zhamkov	Communist Party	1,591	7.91%
Dmitry Kozyrev	A Just Russia	1,184	5.88%
Total		20,121	100%

==== District 17 ====
Summary of the 18–20 September 2026 State Assembly of the Republic of Mordovia election in Moskovsky constituency No.17
Candidate	Party	Votes	%
Sergey Vdovin (incumbent)	United Russia	8,837	59.32%
Sergey Yekaterinin	Liberal Democratic Party	2,196	14.74%
Vadim Piksaykin	Communist Party	2,115	14.20%
Nikita Vedyaykin	A Just Russia	1,438	9.65%
Total		14,898	100%

==== District 18 ====
Summary of the 18–20 September 2026 State Assembly of the Republic of Mordovia election in Pushkinsky constituency No.18
Candidate	Party	Votes	%
Yury Konnov	United Russia	7,966	57.96%
Vitaly Napalkov	Liberal Democratic Party	1,811	13.18%
Vladimir Kovalenko	Communist Party	1,694	12.32%
Gennady Tulayev	New People	1,171	8.52%
Timur Geraskin	A Just Russia	979	7.12%
Total		13,745	100%

==== District 19 ====
Summary of the 18–20 September 2026 State Assembly of the Republic of Mordovia election in Central constituency No.19
Candidate	Party	Votes	%
Natalya Dolmatova (incumbent)	United Russia	9,745	61.24%
Alina Khripunova	Communist Party	1,898	11.93%
Yury Kazakov	Liberal Democratic Party	1,579	9.92%
Sergey Tambovtsev	New People	1,282	8.06%
Sergey Kunev	A Just Russia	1,131	7.11%
Total		15,912	100%

==== District 20 ====
Summary of the 18–20 September 2026 State Assembly of the Republic of Mordovia election in Chamzinsky constituency No.20
Candidate	Party	Votes	%
Sergey Marachkov	United Russia	14,398	83.25%
Natalia Arzamaskina	Liberal Democratic Party	1,060	6.13%
Aleksandr Bochkarev	Communist Party	1,017	5.88%
Vladimir Shigayev	A Just Russia	738	4.27%
Total		17,295	100%

==== District 21 ====
Summary of the 18–20 September 2026 State Assembly of the Republic of Mordovia election in Energetichesky constituency No.21
Candidate	Party	Votes	%
Sergey Chvanov (incumbent)	United Russia	5,413	38.49%
Aleksey Zakhryapin	Liberal Democratic Party	3,546	25.22%
Roman Ledakov	Communist Party	2,268	16.13%
Antonina Shegurova	New People	2,240	15.93%
Total		14,062	100%

==== District 22 ====
Summary of the 18–20 September 2026 State Assembly of the Republic of Mordovia election in Yubileyny constituency No.22
Candidate	Party	Votes	%
Svetlana Limanskaya	United Russia	7,929	53.15%
Yelena Zhigunova	Liberal Democratic Party	2,220	14.88%
Dmitry Bersenin	Communist Party	1,929	12.93%
Anastasia Pichunova	New People	1,530	10.26%
Aleksandr Kochin	A Just Russia	906	6.07%
Total		14,917	100%

==== District 23 ====
Summary of the 18–20 September 2026 State Assembly of the Republic of Mordovia election in South-Western constituency No.23
Candidate	Party	Votes	%
Georgy Vesnushkin (incumbent)	United Russia	9,633	59.64%
Vladimir Lychagin	Liberal Democratic Party	1,918	11.87%
Mikhail Malygin	Communist Party	1,875	11.61%
Dmitry Khalipa	New People	1,262	7.81%
Mikhail Batin	A Just Russia	1,179	7.30%
Total		16,152	100%

==== District 24 ====
Summary of the 18–20 September 2026 State Assembly of the Republic of Mordovia election in Yalginsky constituency No.24
Candidate	Party	Votes	%
Dmitry Amelkin	United Russia	8,374	52.20%
Denis Aladyshev	Communist Party	2,861	17.83%
Larisa Fetkhullova	Liberal Democratic Party	2,687	16.75%
Aleksey Shigayev	A Just Russia	1,780	11.10%
Total		16,043	100%

=== Members ===
Incumbent deputies are highlighted with bold, elected members who declined to take a seat are marked with ~~strikethrough~~.

Constituency
No.	Member	Party
1	Vladimir Kabayev	United Russia
2	Mikhail Grechishnikov	United Russia
3	Mikhail Podmarev	United Russia
4	Andrey Fatkin	United Russia
5	Nikolay Chalov	United Russia
6	Kuzma Samolkin	United Russia
7	Sergey Ageyev	United Russia
8	Aleksey Fedkov	United Russia
9	Peter Tultaev	United Russia
10	Valery Alyokhin	United Russia
11	Vasily Bataykin	United Russia
12	Aleksandr Atlasov	United Russia
13	Sergey Ladyayev	United Russia
14	Valery Makeyev	United Russia
15	Anatoly Gulin	United Russia
16	Natalya Makarova	United Russia
17	Sergey Vdovin	United Russia
18	Yury Konnov	United Russia
19	Natalya Dolmatova	United Russia
20	Sergey Marachkov	United Russia
21	Sergey Chvanov	United Russia
22	Svetlana Limanskaya	United Russia
23	Georgy Vesnushkin	United Russia
24	Dmitry Amelkin	United Russia

Party lists
Member	Party
~~Artyom Zdunov~~	United Russia
Sergey Abedkin	United Russia
Lyudmila Adushkina	United Russia
Vladimir Golubev	United Russia
Tatyana Volkova	United Russia
Olga Makedonskaya	United Russia
Yevgeny Ledyaykin	United Russia
Igor Yeremkin	United Russia
Galina Babina	United Russia
Aleksey Lapshin	United Russia
Tatyana Artyushina	United Russia
Dmitry Makarov	United Russia
Viktor Rubtsov	United Russia
Vladimir Chibirkin	United Russia
Vladislav Portnov	United Russia
Aleksandr Petryakov	United Russia
Ruslan Mukhayev	United Russia
Anatoly Krasheninnikov	United Russia
Nikolay Mamayev	United Russia
Larisa Balykova	United Russia
Aleksey Alagulov	United Russia
Dmitry Kuzyakin	Communist Party
Pavel Feofanov	Communist Party
~~Leonid Slutsky~~	Liberal Democratic Party
Yevgeny Tyurin	Liberal Democratic Party
Aleksey Zakhryapin	Liberal Democratic Party

== See also ==
- 2026 Russian regional elections
