= Insar =

Insar may refer to:

- Insar (inhabited locality), several inhabited localities in Russia
- Insar Urban Settlement, a municipal formation into which the town of district significance of Insar in Insarsky District of the Republic of Mordovia, Russia is incorporated
- Insar (river), a river in the Republic of Mordovia, Russia
- Interferometric synthetic aperture radar (InSAR), a radar technique used in geodesy
- International Society for Autism Research (INSAR), sponsored by the Autism Research Institute
- Ahmed Insar, a candidate in the Nottingham City Council election, 2011 (England)
- Ansar, Lebanon
