= Viktor Kidyayev =

Russian politician

Viktor Kidyayev MP
- Виктор Кидяев
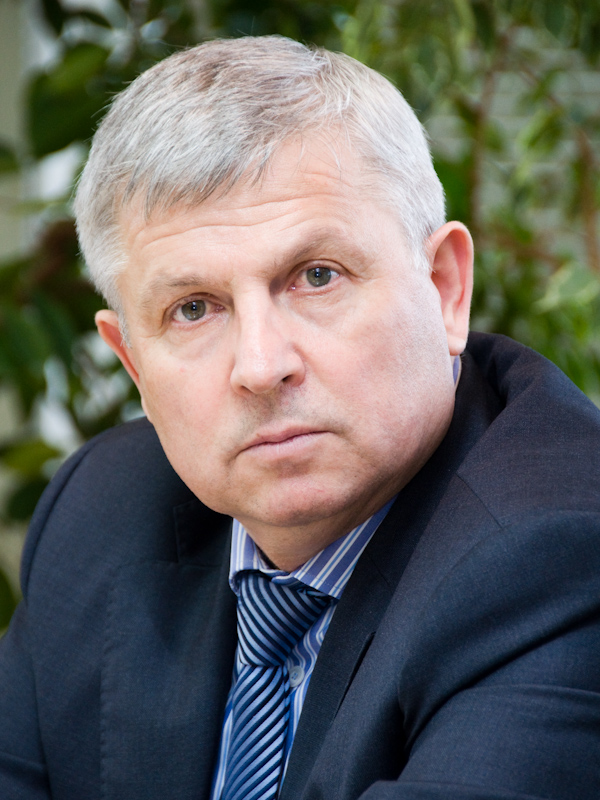

Member of the State Duma
- Incumbent
- Assumed office 29 May 2009
- Preceded by: Multi-member district
- Constituency: Mordovia (No.28) (2026-present); Party List (2009-2026)

Chairman of the State Duma Committee on the Federal Structure and Local Government
- In office December 2011 – September 2016
- Preceded by: Vyacheslav Timchenko
- Succeeded by: Alexei Didenko

Personal details
- Born: 9 July 1956 (age 70) Zhukovka, Mordovian ASSR, Russian SFSR, USSR
- Party: United Russia
- Education: Mordovian State University

Viktor Borisovich Kidyayev (Russian: Виктор Борисович Кидяев; born 9 July 1956, Zhukovka, Mordovian Autonomous Soviet Socialist Republic) is a Russian politician. A member of United Russia, he has served as a member of the State Duma since 2009.

In 1986, he headed the knitting factory in Zubova Polyana. From 1987 to 1996, he was the chairman of the district consumer union. Kidyaev was elected member of the district council of deputies and deputy of the State Assembly of the Republic of Mordovia. In 1996, he was elected head of the Zubovo-Polyansky District and remained in that position for more than 12 years. Since 2007, he has been a member of the United Russia party. In 2009, he received the mandate of deputy Oleg Korgunov in the 5th State Duma. In 2011, 2016, and 2021 he was re-elected as deputy of the 6th, 7th, and 8th State Dumas respectively.

In 2015, Viktor Kidayev was suspended from supervising the United Russia election campaign in the Kaluga Oblast following reports of intimidation of members of the region's election commission.

In 2011–2016, he served as a deputy of the State Duma of the 6th convocation, elected on the United Russia party list.

== Sanctions ==
He was sanctioned by the UK government in 2022 in relation to the Russo-Ukrainian War.

He is one of the members of the State Duma the United States Treasury sanctioned on 24 March 2022 in response to the 2022 Russian invasion of Ukraine.

== Awards ==
- Order of Friendship
- Order of Glory
