= 2021 Mordovia head election =

- 17–19 September 2021
- Turnout: 64.80%
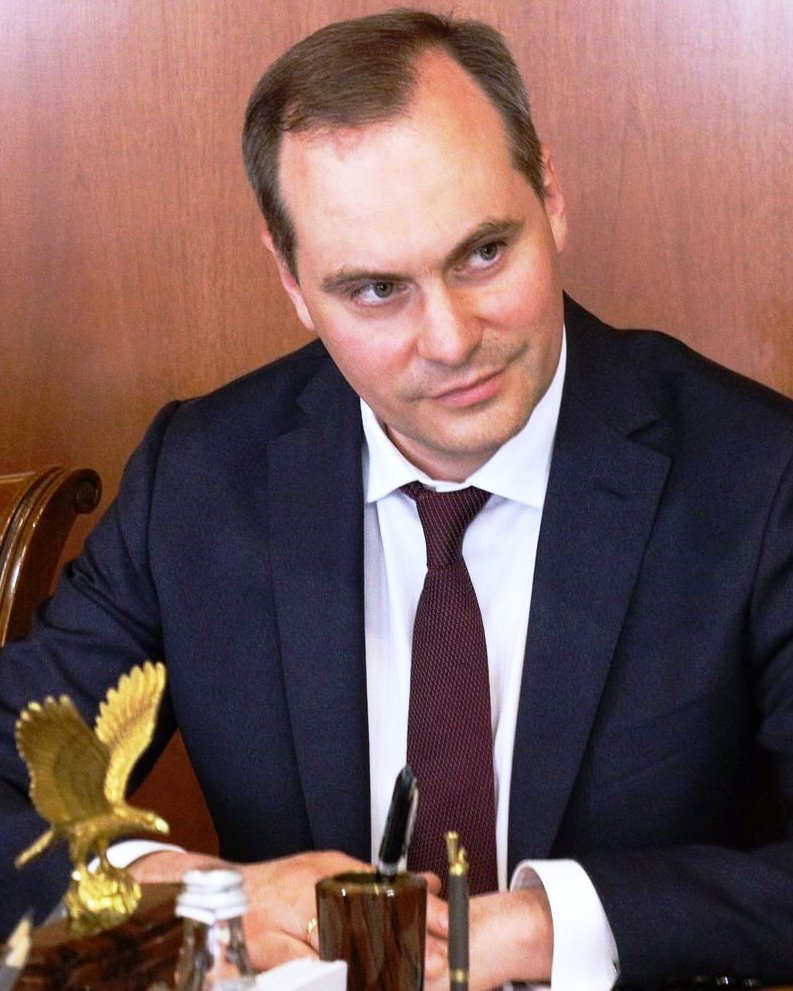

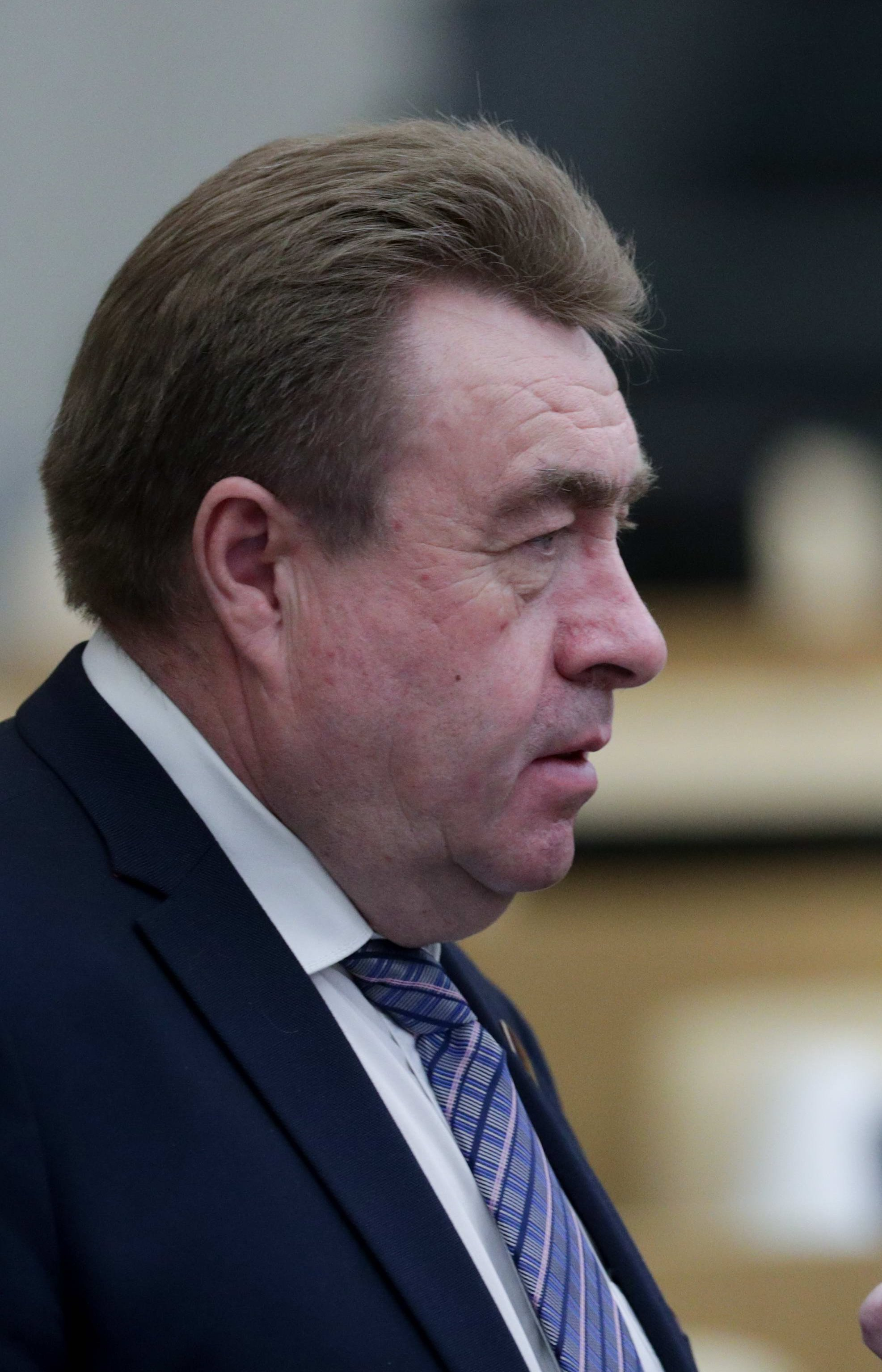
			LDPR
Candidate	Artyom Zdunov	Dmitry Kuzyakin	Yevgeny Tyurin
Party	United Russia	CPRF	LDPR
Popular vote	298,571	43,801	23,688
Percentage	78.26%	11.48%	6.21%
Head before election
Artyom Zdunov
United Russia
Elected Head
Artyom Zdunov
United Russia

The 2021 Republic of Mordovia head election took place on 17–19 September 2021, on common election day, coinciding with election to the State Duma. Acting Head Artyom Zdunov was elected for his first full term.

== Background ==
Vladimir Volkov was the Head of the Republic of Mordovia since 2012, but he is a fixture in Mordovian politics after serving as Prime Minister of Mordovia in 1995–2012 under Nikolay Merkushkin. Volkov won his latest and only election in 2017 with 89.19% of the vote. On 18 November 2020 Vladimir Volkov asked Russian President Vladimir Putin about his retirement, and Putin appointed Artyom Zdunov as acting Head of Mordovia. Zdunov, an ethnic Mordvin, previously served as Prime Minister of Dagestan in 2018–2020 and Minister of Economy of Tatarstan in 2014–2018. Under Merkushkin and Volkov Mordovia was considered an "electoral sultanate" - a Russian region with high administrative control over voting process which results in consistent support for ruling United Russia, so the September head election is characterised as uncompetitive and predictable.

== Candidates ==
Only political parties can nominate candidates for head election in Mordovia, self-nomination is not possible. However, candidate is not obliged to be a member of the nominating party. Candidate for Head of the Republic of Mordovia should be a Russian citizen and at least 30 years old. Candidates for Head should not have a foreign citizenship or residence permit. Each candidate in order to be registered is required to collect at least 7% of signatures of members and heads of municipalities (184–193 signatures). Also gubernatorial candidates present 3 candidacies to the Federation Council and election winner later appoints one of the presented candidates.

=== Registered candidates ===
- Artyom Zdunov (United Russia), acting Head of the Republic of Mordovia, former Prime Minister of Dagestan (2018–2020)
- Dmitry Kuzyakin (CPRF), Member of the State Duma, 2017 head candidate
- Aleksandr Lemkin (RPPSS), pensioner
- Yevgeny Tyurin (LDPR), Member of State Assembly of Mordovia, 2017 head candidate

=== Failed to qualify ===
- Valery Bykov (SR-ZP), former Chief of regional Administration of Federal Migration Service (2010–2013)

=== Candidates for the Federation Council ===
- Artyom Zdunov (United Russia):
  - Sergey Kislyak, incumbent Senator of the Federation Council
  - Igor Freydin, deputy general director for strategic development of LLP "Turboenergoremont"
  - Mikhail Sezganov, chief federal inspector for Mordovia
- Dmitry Kuzyakin (CPRF):
  - Viktor Venchakov, chairman of regional Association of Law Enforcement Officers
  - Aleksey Savkin, director of LLP "SALANG"
  - Stanislav Marin, dermatovenerology doctor
- Aleksandr Lemkin (RPPSS):
  - Ruslan Mukhaev, chairman of public organization of small and medium enterprise "Opora Rossii" regional office
  - Aleksey Polozov, chairman of Saransk Proletarsky District Veterans' Organisation
  - Yevgeny Yachinov, chairman of Saransk Mechanical Plant labour union
- Yevgeny Tyurin (LDPR):
  - Aleksey Zakhryapin, member of Saransk Council of Deputies
  - Pavel Fominov, individual entrepreneur
  - Anatoly Vakhterov, lawyer

== Finances ==
All sums are in rubles.

Financial Report	Source	Zdunov	Kuzyakin	Lemkin	Tyurin
First		20,000	220,500	20,000	200,000
Final		13,520,000	443,400	25,000	1,000,000

== Results ==
Candidate	Party	Votes	%
Artyom Zdunov	United Russia	298,571	79.38
Dmitry Kuzyakin	Communist Party	43,801	11.64
Yevgeny Tyurin	Liberal Democratic Party	23,688	6.30
Aleksandr Lemkin	Party of Pensioners	10,081	2.68
Total		376,141	100.00
Valid votes		376,141	98.59
Invalid/blank votes		5,371	1.41
Total votes		381,512	100.00
Registered voters/turnout		588,731	64.80
Source: CEC

Incumbent Senator Sergey Kislyak (Independent) was re-appointed to the Federation Council.
