= Krasnoslobodsk =

Krasnoslobodsk (Russian: Краснослободск) is the name of several urban localities in Russia:

- Krasnoslobodsk, Republic of Mordovia, a town in the Republic of Mordovia
- Krasnoslobodsk, Volgograd Oblast, a town in Volgograd Oblast

== See also ==
- Krasnoslobodsky (disambiguation)
