= Ogloblin =

Ogloblin (Russian: Оглоблин; masculine) or Ogloblina (Russian: Оглоблина; feminine) is a Russian last name shared by the following people:

- Dmitry Ogloblin (born 1956), a former Soviet speedskater
- Dmitriy Ogloblin (entomologist) (1893—1942), a Russian entomologist
- Yulia Ogloblina (born 1989), Russian politician
