= Krasnoslobodsky =

Krasnoslobodsky (masculine), Krasnoslobodskaya (feminine), or Krasnoslobodskoye (neuter) may refer to:

- Krasnoslobodsky District, a district of the Republic of Mordovia, Russia
- Krasnoslobodskoye Urban Settlement, a municipal formation which the town of district significance of Krasnoslobodsk in Krasnoslobodsky District of the Republic of Mordovia is incorporated as
- Krasnoslobodsky (rural locality), a rural locality (a settlement) in Tambov Oblast Russia
- Krasnoslobodskoye (rural locality), a rural locality (a selo) in Sverdlovsk Oblast, Russia
