= Peter Tultaev =

Russian politician (born 1961)

- Пётр Тултаев
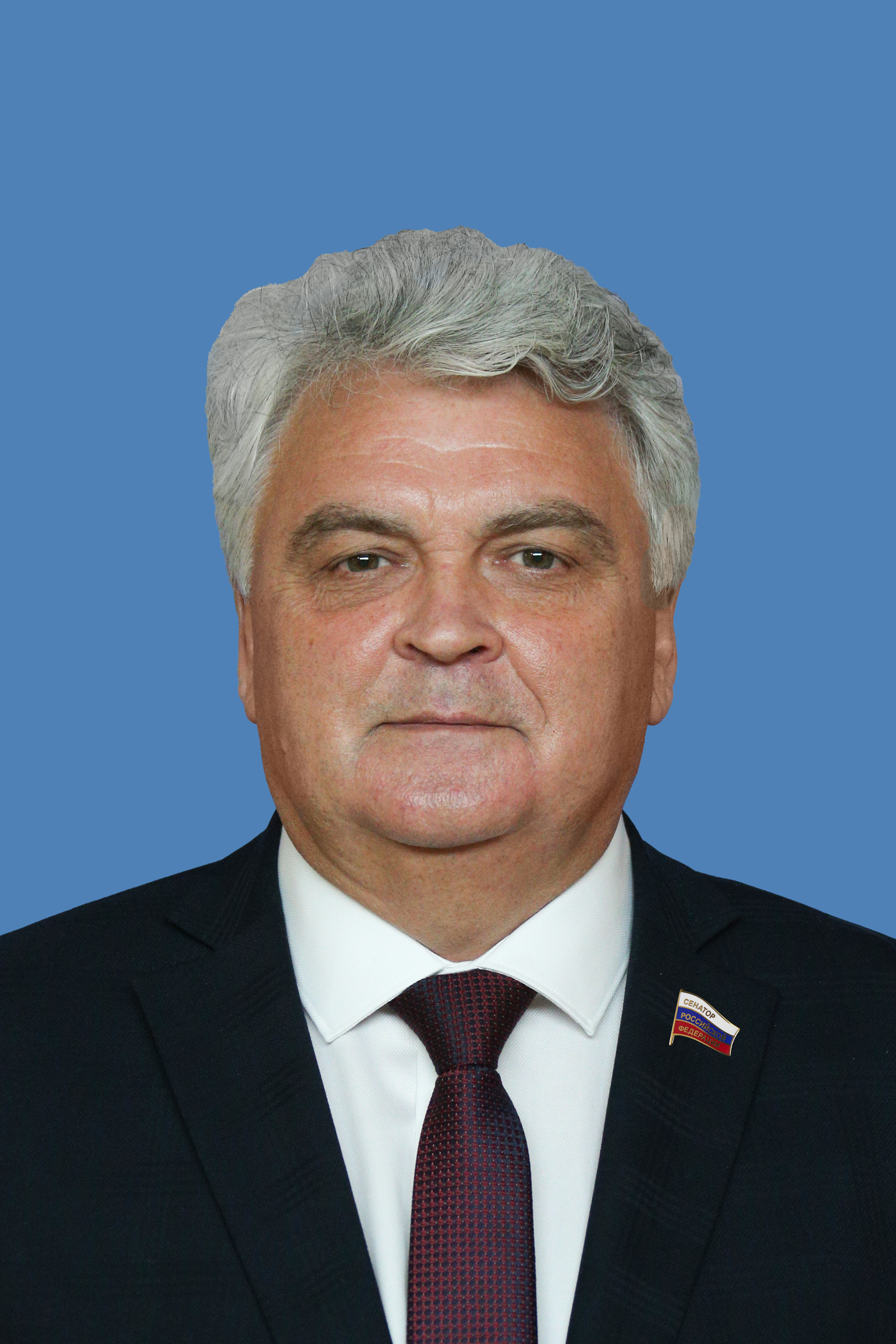

Senator from Mordovia
- Incumbent
- Assumed office 4 October 2021
- Preceded by: Vladimir Lityushkin

Personal details
- Born: Peter Tultaev; 1 January 1961 (age 65) Krasnoslobodsky District, Mordovian Autonomous Soviet Socialist Republic, Soviet Union
- Party: United Russia
- Education: Mordovian State University

Peter Nikolayevich Tultaev (Russian: Пётр Николаевич Тултаев; born 1 January 1961) is a Russian politician serving as a senator from Mordovia since 4 October 2021.

== Biography ==
Peter Tultaev was born on 1 January 1961 in Krasnoslobodsky District, Mordovian Autonomous Soviet Socialist Republic. In 1983, he graduated from the Mordovian State University, and in 1997 he received a degree from the Higher Komsomol School under the Central Committee of the All-Union Leninist Young Communist League. From 1983 to 1993, Tultaev worked as a journalist and an editor of the local newspaper "Saransk courier". In 1993, he was appointed Head of the Department of Culture of the Administration of the Proletarsky District of Saransk. From July 2001 to March 2010, he was the Minister of Culture of Mordovia. In 2012 he was appointed the mayor of Saransk. He left his post in 2021 to become a senator from Mordovia.

Peter Tultaev is under personal sanctions introduced by the European Union, the United Kingdom, the USA, Canada, Switzerland, Australia, Ukraine, New Zealand, for ratifying the decisions of the "Treaty of Friendship, Cooperation and Mutual Assistance between the Russian Federation and the Donetsk People's Republic and between the Russian Federation and the Luhansk People's Republic" and providing political and economic support for Russia's annexation of Ukrainian territories.
