= Insar (inhabited locality) =

Insar (Russian: Инсар) is the name of several inhabited localities in the Republic of Mordovia, Russia.

Urban localities

- Insar, Insarsky District, Republic of Mordovia, a town in Insarsky District

Rural localities

- Insar, Kadoshkinsky District, Republic of Mordovia, a settlement in Pushkinsky Selsoviet of Kadoshkinsky District
