= Vladimir Volkov (politician) =

- Владимир Волков
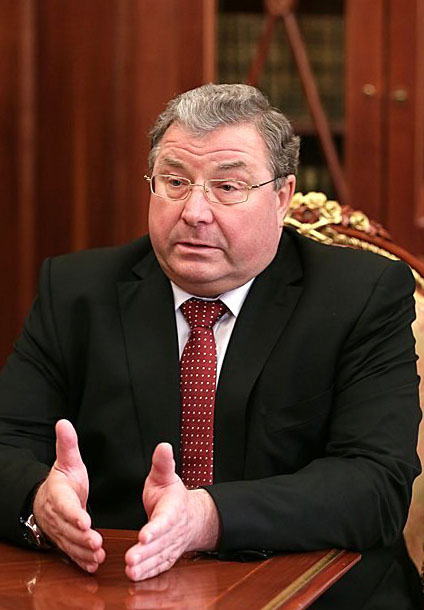
- Volkov in 2013

2nd Head of the Republic of Mordovia
- In office 14 May 2012 – 18 November 2020
- Preceded by: Nikolay Merkushkin
- Succeeded by: Artyom Zdunov

Personal details
- Born: Vladimir Dmitriyevich Volkov; 7 September 1954 (age 72) Novoye Arakcheyevo, Krasnoslobodsky District, Mordovian ASSR, Russian SFSR, Soviet Union
- Party: United Russia

Vladimir Dmitriyevich Volkov (Russian: Влади́мир Дми́триевич Во́лков; born on 7 September 1954), is a Russian politician. He served as the acting Head of the Republic of Mordovia from 14 May 2012 until his resignation on 18 November 2020.

== Biography ==
Vladimir Volkov was born on 7 September 1954 in the village of Novoye Arakcheyevo in Krasnoslobodsky District of the Mordovian ASSR. In 1976 he graduated from the Mordovian State University. In 1976 he graduated from Mordovian State University, majoring in electric engineering, and then worked as an instructor of the regional headquarters of student construction teams Mordovia regional committee of Komsomol.

All of the further career of Vladimir Volkov, until 1991, is connected with the Komsomol and party work. From 1977 to 1979 he worked as a secretary of the Komsomol Committee of the Mordovian State University, and in 1979, he was appointed commander of the regional student detachment of the Mordovian regional committee of Komsomol.

In 1983, he was transferred to work in the Saransk Hills Komsomol, where he worked until 1986 as the first secretary of the Saransk city committee of the Komsomol.

From 1986 to 1988, he was the head of the industrial and transportation department of the Saransk city committee of the CPSU. In 1988, he graduated from Mordovia State University, with a degree in civil engineering, receiving a second higher education.

From 1988 to 1990 he worked as the first secretary of the Proletarian District Committee of the CPSU of the city of Saransk.

In the period from 1990 to 1995, he was the Chairman of the Standing Committee of the Supreme Council of the Republic of Mordovia on capital construction, industry and building materials.

From the beginning of 1995 he worked as the deputy chairman of the State Assembly of the Republic of Mordovia, serving Nikolay Merkushkin.

On 10 May 2012, after Nikolay Merkuskhkin left the post and transferred to work in the Samara Oblast, he was appointed acting head of the Republic of Mordovia by a presidential decree of Vladimir Putin.

In his first interview as acting head of the region, Vladimir Volkov announced his desire to continue the course for further development of the republic.

The course for further development of the republic will be continued. Today in Mordovia the mechanism of work is debugged, a management system has been built up, which clearly functions. When a successful leader leaves all this created, this is a great loss, but we have to continue this work. I am well aware of the problems that need to be addressed, so we will work on them. As for the main tasks, they were already outlined in the economy, social sphere, and those issues related to the strengthening of the image of Mordovia in the world and in Russia.

— Interview of Vladimir Volkov

On 12 May 2012, Russian President Vladimir Putin nominated Volkov for the post of the Head of the Republic of Mordovia for consideration in the State Assembly of the Republic of Mordovia.

On 14 May 2012, the State Assembly of the Republic of Mordovia approved Vladimir Volkov as Head of the Republic of Mordovia.

On 12 April 2017, Volkov filed an application for early resignation, but on the same day he was appointed by the decree of Putin, as the acting head of the Republic of Mordovia for the second term, until the person elected by the Head of the Republic of Mordovia took office.
