= Vasily Guslyannikov =

Russian Politician

- Василий Гуслянников

President of Mordovia
- In office 26 December 1991 – 7 April 1993
- Preceded by: Position established
- Succeeded by: Position abolished; Nikolay Merkushkin as Head of the Republic (1995)

Personal details
- Born: 21 April 1949 (age 75); Peski, Povorinsky District, Voronezh Oblast, RSFSR, Soviet Union

Vasily Dmitriyevich Guslyannikov (Russian: Василий Дмитриевич Гуслянников; born 21 April 1949) is a Russian retired politician, who served as first and only President of Mordovia in 1991–1993.

== Biography ==
Vasily Guslyannikov was born in 1949 in Voronezh Oblast. Since 1961, he has lived in Mordovia. In 1971, he graduated from the Mordovian State University. Since 1973, he was an engineer at the semiconductor plant "Elektrovypryamitel", Saransk. In 1990, he was elected a People's Deputy of the Mordovian ASSR. He led the Democratic Russia electoral bloc, which had a majority in the Saransk City Council.

In October 1990, the first secretary of the CPSU regional committee Anatoly Berezin, resigned, who had led the republic for 19 years. His retirement ensured rapid disorganization of the one-party government in Mordovia. In October 1991. the Supreme Soviet of Mordovia established the presidency and called the election for 14 December 1991, but the former nomenklatura failed to gather together and nominate a single candidate. As a result of vote splitting in the first round, Supreme Soviet chairman Nikolay Biryukov came first with only 18.9% of the vote, and Guslyannikov received 16.6%. He won in runoff with 56% of the vote.

A former engineer with little to no political experience, Guslyannikov faced opposition both from nomenklatura and the democrats and was unable to form a sustainable administration. In April 1993, taking advantage of growing discontent in the public, the Supreme Soviet voted to abolish the presidential office and appointed Valery Shvetsov as prime minister. As a result, two parallel governments existed for some time, but gradually most of Guslyannikov's ministers went to work with Shvetsov. In June 1993, the Constitutional Court of Russia recognized abolition of Mordovian presidency as legal.

Since 1996, Vasily Guslyannikov chairs the Mordovian Human Rights Center. He is married and has two daughters.

== Sources ==
- Kynev, Alexander (2020). Губернаторы в России: между выборами и назначениями [Governors in Russia: Between Elections and Appointments] (in Russian). ISBN 978-5-903135-68-4.
