= Vitaly Efimov (politician) =

Russian politician (born 1940)

Vitaly Efimov MP
- Виталий Ефимов
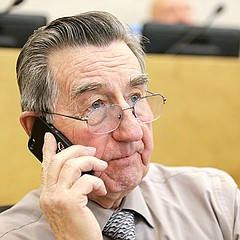
- Efimov in 2018

Member of the State Duma (Party List Seat)
- Incumbent
- Assumed office 12 October 2021
- In office 21 December 2011 – 5 October 2016

Member of the State Duma for Mordovia
- In office 5 October 2016 – 12 October 2021
- Preceded by: constituency re-established
- Succeeded by: Yulia Ogloblina
- Constituency: Mordovia-at-large (No. 23)

Minister of Transport
- In office 25 December 1991 – 10 January 1996
- Succeeded by: Nikolay Tsakh

Personal details
- Born: 4 April 1940 (age 86) Sovkhoz Red Dawn, Moscow Oblast, RSFSR, USSR
- Party: United Russia
- Education: Gorky Agricultural Institute

Vitaly Borisovich Efimov (Russian: Виталий Борисович Ефимов; born 4 April 1940) is a Russian political figure and a deputy of the 6th, 7th, and 8th State Dumas.

From 1967 to 1991, Efimov was a member of the Communist Party of the Soviet Union. From 1976 to 1983, he worked as the Chief Engineer of the Volga-Vyatka Territorial Transport Administration of the Ministry of Road Transport of the RSFSR. In 1983-1986, he headed the Gorky Territorial Association of Transport "Gorkiyavtotrans" of the Ministry of Transport of the USSR.

In 1986, he defended his Candidate of Sciences thesis, and in 1993, his Doctor of Sciences thesis. He is an Academician of the Russian Academy of Transport.

From 1986 to 1990, he worked as Deputy Minister of Transport of the RSFSR. On 8 September 1990, he was appointed the Minister of Transport. He left the post in 1996 to become trade representative of the Russian Federation in Hungary. He left the post as he reached retirement age. In 2002, he headed the Committee on Transport of the Chamber of Commerce and Industry of the Russian Federation. In 2011, he was elected deputy of the 6th State Duma from the Mordovia constituency. In 2014, he joined the All-Russia People's Front. In 2016 and 2021, he was re-elected for the 7th, and 8th State Dumas.

== Academic Activity ==
In 1986, he defended his Candidate of Sciences dissertation, and in 1993, his Doctor of Sciences dissertation. He is a full member of the Academy of Transport of the Russian Federation.

== Selected Works ==
Main source: Electronic catalogues of the National Library of Russia

- Efimov V. B. The System of Management Organization of Russia’s Transport and Road Complex under the Formation of Market Relations: Abstract of the dissertation for the degree of Doctor of Economic Sciences. — Moscow, 1993. — 58 p.
- Efimov V. B. Improvement of the Structure of the Production and Technical Base of Automobile Transport in the Region through Specialization and Production Cooperation: Abstract of the dissertation for the degree of Candidate of Technical Sciences. — Moscow, 1986. — 19 p.

== Awards ==
- Order of Honour (8 March 2015) — for a major contribution to the development of Russian parliamentarianism and active legislative activity.
- Honoured Transport Worker of the Russian Federation (27 November 2009) — for a major personal contribution to the development of the transport sector and many years of conscientious work.
- Commendation of the President of the Russian Federation (14 August 1995) — for active participation in the preparation and celebration of the 50th anniversary of Victory in the Great Patriotic War of 1941–1945.

== Sanctions ==
He was sanctioned by the UK government in 2022 in relation to the Russo-Ukrainian War.
