= Viktor Grishin (economist) =

Russian economist and politician

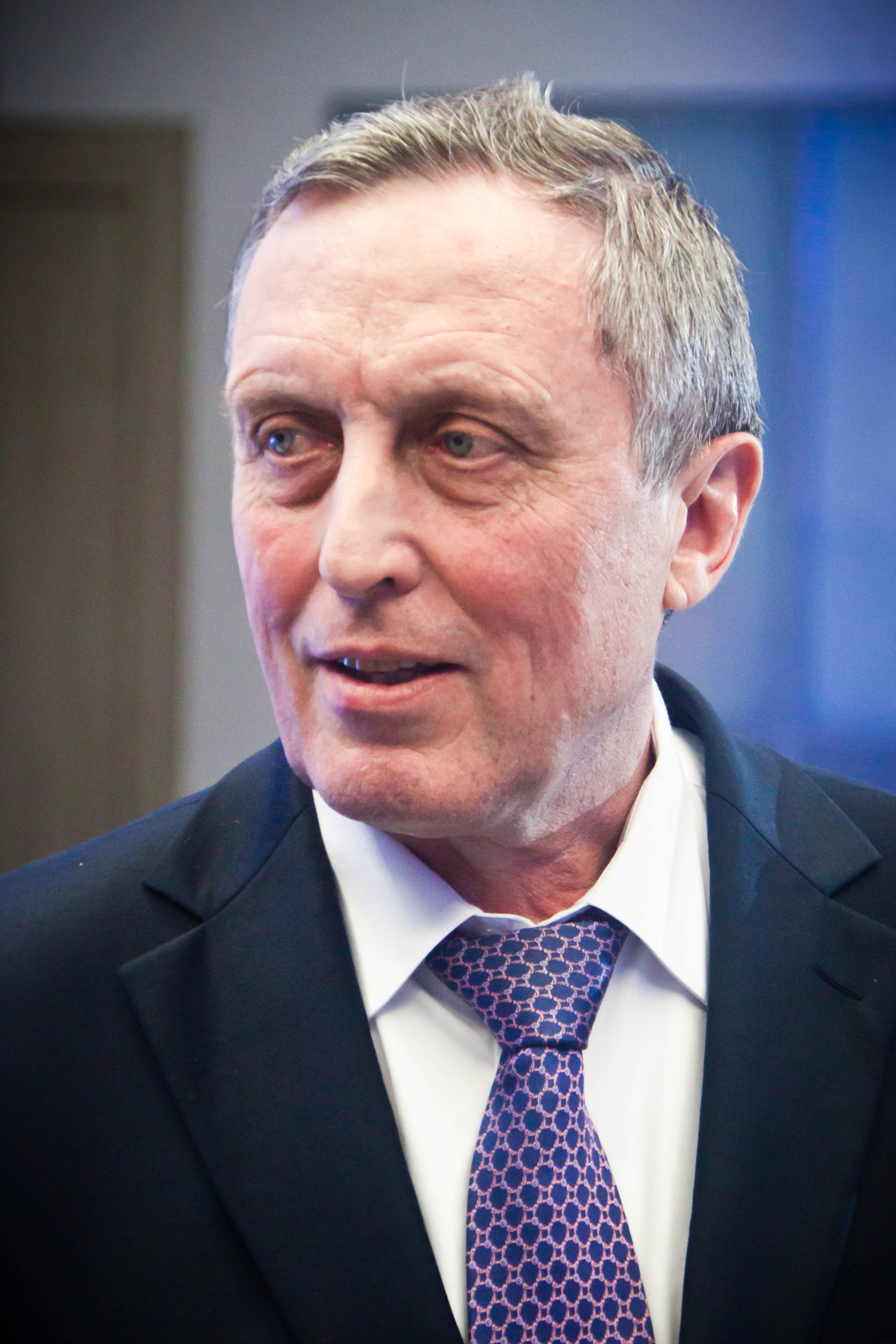

Rector of the Plekhanov Russian University of Economics
- In office 2008–2020

member of Russia's State Duma
- In office 1999–2008

Personal details
- Born: 17 February 1951 (age 75) Bolshebereznikovsky District, Soviet Union
- Education: Tomsk Institute of Radioelectronics and Electronic Engineering
- Occupation: economist

Viktor Ivanovich Grishin (in Russian: Виктор Иванович Гришин; born 17 February 1951, Bolshebereznikovsky District, Soviet Union) is a Russian economist and politician, full Ph.D. in Economics, and professor.

== Early life ==
In 1973, he graduated from the Tomsk Institute of Radioelectronics and Electronic Engineering. From 1973 to 1984 he worked as engineer at various industrial establishments in Tomsk and Saransk. From 1981 to 1984 he attended graduate school at the Research Institute of USSR Ministry of Construction.

== Career ==
From 1985 to 1988 he served as Deputy Chairman of the State Planning Committee of the Mordovian ASSR.

From 1989 to 1992 he served as Deputy Chairman of the State Committee of the Mordovian ASSR for Economics.

From 1992 - Deputy Minister, then Minister of Economics, from May 1996 he became Deputy Prime Minister - Minister of Economy of the Republic of Mordovia.

From 1999 to 2008 has been a member of Russia's State Duma of the third, fourth and fifth convocations. He served as Chairman of the State Duma Committee on Federation Affairs and Regional Policy, member of the Energy Committee, Deputy Head of the United Russia fraction in the State Duma.

From 2008 to 2020 he served as Rector of Plekhanov Russian University of Economics.

In January 2006 he became full Ph.D. in Economics.

== Honors and awards ==
- Order of Honour (2003).
- Order "For Merit to the Fatherland", 4th class (2015).

== Family ==
Married with a son and a daughter, 7 grandchildren.
