= Nikolay Merkushkin =

Russian politician (born 1951)

- Николай Меркушкин; Кола Меркушкин
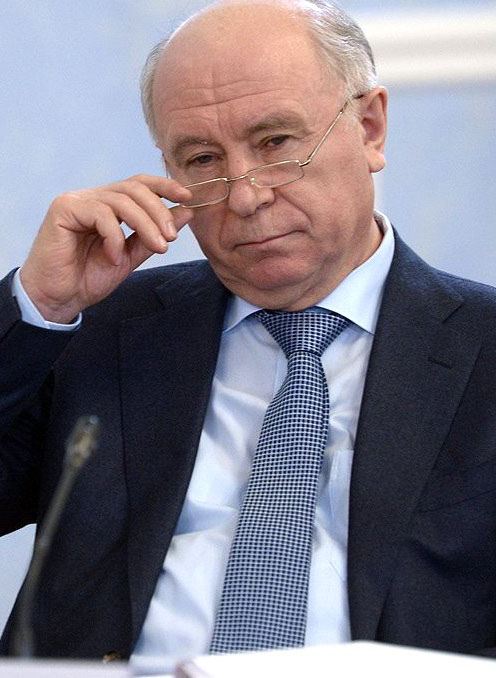
- Merkushkin in 2014

3rd Governor of Samara Oblast
- In office 10 May 2012 – 25 September 2017
- Preceded by: Vladimir Artyakov
- Succeeded by: Dmitry Azarov

1st Head of the Republic of Mordovia
- In office 22 September 1995 – 10 May 2012
- Preceded by: Vasily Guslyannikov (president, 1991–93)
- Succeeded by: Vladimir Volkov

Personal details
- Born: 5 February 1951 (age 75) Novye Verkhissy, Insarsky District, Mordovian ASSR, RSFSR, Soviet Union
- Party: United Russia
- Spouse: Taisiya Merkushina
- Children: 2
- Education: Mordovian State University
- Profession: Politician

Nikolay Ivanovich Merkushkin (Russian: Николай Иванович Меркушкин; Moksha: Кола Меркушкин; born 5 February 1951) is a Russian politician who served as Governor of Samara Oblast from 2012 to 2017 and as Head of the Republic of Mordovia from 1995 to 2012. From 24 January to 22 September 1995, he served as Chairman of the State Assembly of Mordovia.

== Career ==
Merkushkin was an electrical engineer before entering politics. He was reelected president of Mordovia in 1998 and 2003 with 80% of the vote. He has maintained popularity by having a relatively stable economy in the republic and paying salaries and pensions on time. He has prevented opponents from running against him by disqualifying candidates which seem to have more than 3% invalid signatures. Merkushkin is married to Taisiya Merkushkina, an ethnic Erzyan and has two sons.

On 10 May 2012 Merkushkin resigned to become Acting Governor of Samara Oblast. He was replaced by his PM Vladimir Volkov.

On 25 September 2017 he was removed from the position of Governor of the Samara Region.

== Honours and awards ==
- Order "For Merit to the Fatherland", 3rd class
- Order "For Merit to the Fatherland", 4th class
- Order of Alexander Nevsky
- Order of the Red Banner of Labour
- Order of Friendship of Peoples
- Medal "For Labour Valour"
- Medal "For Transforming the Non-Black Earth of the RSFSR"
