= Head of the Republic of Mordovia =

Highest-ranking official in Mordovia, Russia

- Мордовия Республикть Оцюняц (Moksha); Мордовия Республикань Прявт (Erzya); Глава Республики Мордовия (Russian)
- Coat of arms of Mordovia

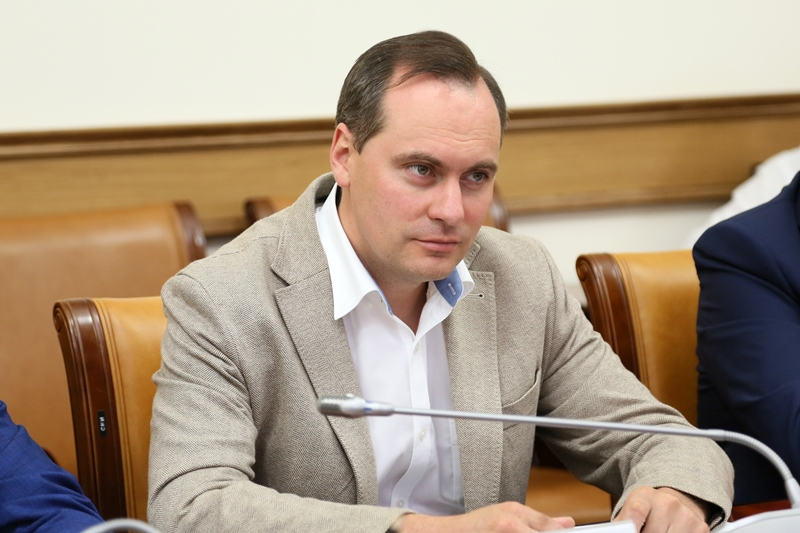
- Incumbent; Artyom Zdunov since 29 September 2021
- Executive branch of the Republic of Mordovia
- Style: His Excellency; The Honorable
- Type: Governor; Head of state; Head of government
- Residence: Saransk
- Nominator: Political parties
- Appointer: Direct elections
- Term length: 5 years; one consecutive re-election possible
- Constituting instrument: Constitution of Mordovia, Section 4
- Formation: 22 September 1995
- First holder: Nikolay Merkushkin
- Website: Official website

The Head of the Republic of Mordovia (Note: Russian: Глава Республики Мордовия, romanized: Glava Respubliki Mordoviya; Moksha: Мордовия Республикть Оцюняц, romanized: Mordoviya Respublikt′ Otsyunyats; Erzya: Мордовия Республикань Прявт, romanized: Mordoviya Respublikan′ Pryavt) (formerly known as the President of the Republic of Mordovia) is the highest office within the Government of the Republic of Mordovia in Russia. The Head is elected by citizens of Russia residing in the republic. Term of service is five years.

== History ==
The post of the Head of Mordovia was introduced in 1995. Before that (1991–93) the President of Mordovia was the highest official of the Republic. In December 1991, Vasily Guslyannikov was elected as the first and last President of Mordovia. In 1993, the Supreme Soviet of Mordovia removed him and abolished this position following Guslyannikov's accusation of abuse and corruption brought by the MPs headed by the speaker and ex-candidate for the presidency Nikolay Biryukov. The Council of Ministers, headed by Valery Shvetsov, was created as the governing body of Mordovia.

In November 1995, elections to the State Assembly of Mordovia and local self-government took place. In January 1995 Nikolay Merkushkin, former leader of Mordovian Komsomol branch, became the Chairman of the State Assembly. On 22 September 1995 the Constitutional Assembly elected him as the Head of the Republic.

== List ==
=== Preceding offices (1990–95) ===
Parliamentary republic

Portrait	Head of state	Term of office	Portrait	Head of government	Term of office	Ref.
	Anatoly Berezin (1931–1998) (Note: Chairman of the Supreme Soviet.)	10 April 1990 – 17 October 1990 (resigned)		Vasily Uchaykin (1934–2024) (Note: Chairman of the Council of Ministers.)	10 April 1990 (Note: Originally appointed by a Communist-dominated Supreme Soviet in 1978, re-appointed by a democratically elected chamber in 1990.) – 23 March 1991 (resigned)	
	Nikolay Biryukov (born 1944)	17 October 1990 – 26 December 1991 (Note: Lost head of state status, continued as parliamentary speaker.)		Anatoly Paulov (1942–2020)	23 March 1991 – 26 December 1991	

Presidential republic

Portrait	Name (lifespan)	Term of office	Political party	Elected	Vice president	Ref.
	Vasily Guslyannikov (born 1949) (Note: President of the Mordovian Soviet Socialist Republic.)	26 December 1991 – 7 April 1993 (position abolished)	Democratic Russia	1991	Vladimir Narezhny	

Parliamentary republic

Portrait	Head of state	Term of office	Political party	Portrait	Head of government	Term of office	Political party	Ref.
	Nikolay Biryukov (born 1944)	7 April 1993 – 24 January 1995 (lost re-election)	Communist		Valery Shvetsov (1939–1995)	9 April 1993 – 22 September 1995	Communist	
	Nikolay Merkushkin (born 1951) (Note: Chairman of the State Assembly.)	24 January 1995 – 22 September 1995	Agrarian		Valery Shvetsov (1939–1995)	9 April 1993 – 22 September 1995	Communist	

=== Heads of the Republic of Mordovia (1995–present) ===
No.	Portrait	Name (lifespan)	Term of office			Political party	Elected	Ref.
No.	Portrait	Name (lifespan)	Took office	Left office	Time in office	Political party	Elected	Ref.
1		Nikolay Merkushkin (born 1951)	22 September 1995	10 May 2012	16 years, 262 days	Agrarian	1995 (Note: Elected by the Constitutional Assembly of Mordovia.); 1998; 2003; 2005 (Note: Appointed by the President of the Russian Federation with the consent of the State Assembly.); 2010	
1		Nikolay Merkushkin (born 1951)	22 September 1995	10 May 2012	16 years, 262 days	Fatherland	1995; 1998; 2003; 2005; 2010	
1		Nikolay Merkushkin (born 1951)	22 September 1995	10 May 2012	16 years, 262 days	United Russia	1995; 1998; 2003; 2005; 2010	
–		Vladimir Volkov (born 1954)	10 May 2012	14 May 2012	8 years, 192 days	United Russia	– (Note: Acting head of the republic.)	
2		Vladimir Volkov (born 1954)	14 May 2012	12 April 2017	8 years, 192 days	United Russia	2012	
–		Vladimir Volkov (born 1954)	12 April 2017	19 September 2017	8 years, 192 days	United Russia	–	
(2)		Vladimir Volkov (born 1954)	19 September 2017	18 November 2020	8 years, 192 days	United Russia	2017	
–		Artyom Zdunov (born 1978)	18 November 2020	29 September 2021	5 years, 308 days	United Russia	–	
3		Artyom Zdunov (born 1978)	29 September 2021	Incumbent	5 years, 308 days	United Russia	2021; 2026	
