= Yulia Ogloblina =

Russian politician (born 1989)

- Юлия Оглоблина
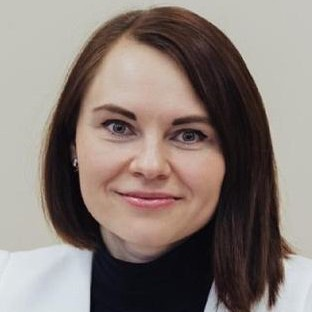
- official portrait, circa 2021

Member of the State Duma for Mordovia
- Incumbent
- Assumed office 12 October 2021
- Preceded by: Vitaly Efimov
- Constituency: Mordovia-at-large (No. 23)

Personal details
- Born: 1 November 1989 (age 36) Torbeyevo, Torbeyevsky District, Mordovian ASSR, RSFSR, USSR
- Party: United Russia
- Education: State University of Land Use Planning

Yulia Vasilievna Ogloblina (Russian: Юлия Васильевна Оглоблина; née Chekashkina (Чекашкина); born 1 November 1989, Torbeyevo) is a Russian political figure and a deputy of the 8th State Duma.

In 2009, Oglobina joined The All-Russian Youth Public Organization “Russian Union of Rural Youth”. She held the positions of regional office specialist and executive director. From 2012 to 2021, Oglobina was the Chairman of the Russian Union of Rural Youth. From 2017 to 2021, she was a member of the Civic Chamber of the Russian Federation. She was also a member of the central headquarters of the All-Russia People's Front. In 2020, she was a member of the working group to prepare proposals for the 2020 amendments to the Constitution of Russia. Since September 2021, she has served as the deputy of the 8th State Duma.

== Sanctions ==
She was sanctioned by the UK government in 2022 in relation to the Russo-Ukrainian War.
