= Krasnoslobodsk, Republic of Mordovia =

Town in the Republic of Mordovia, Russia

Krasnoslobodsk Краснослободск
- Town

Other transcription(s)
  - Moksha: Ош
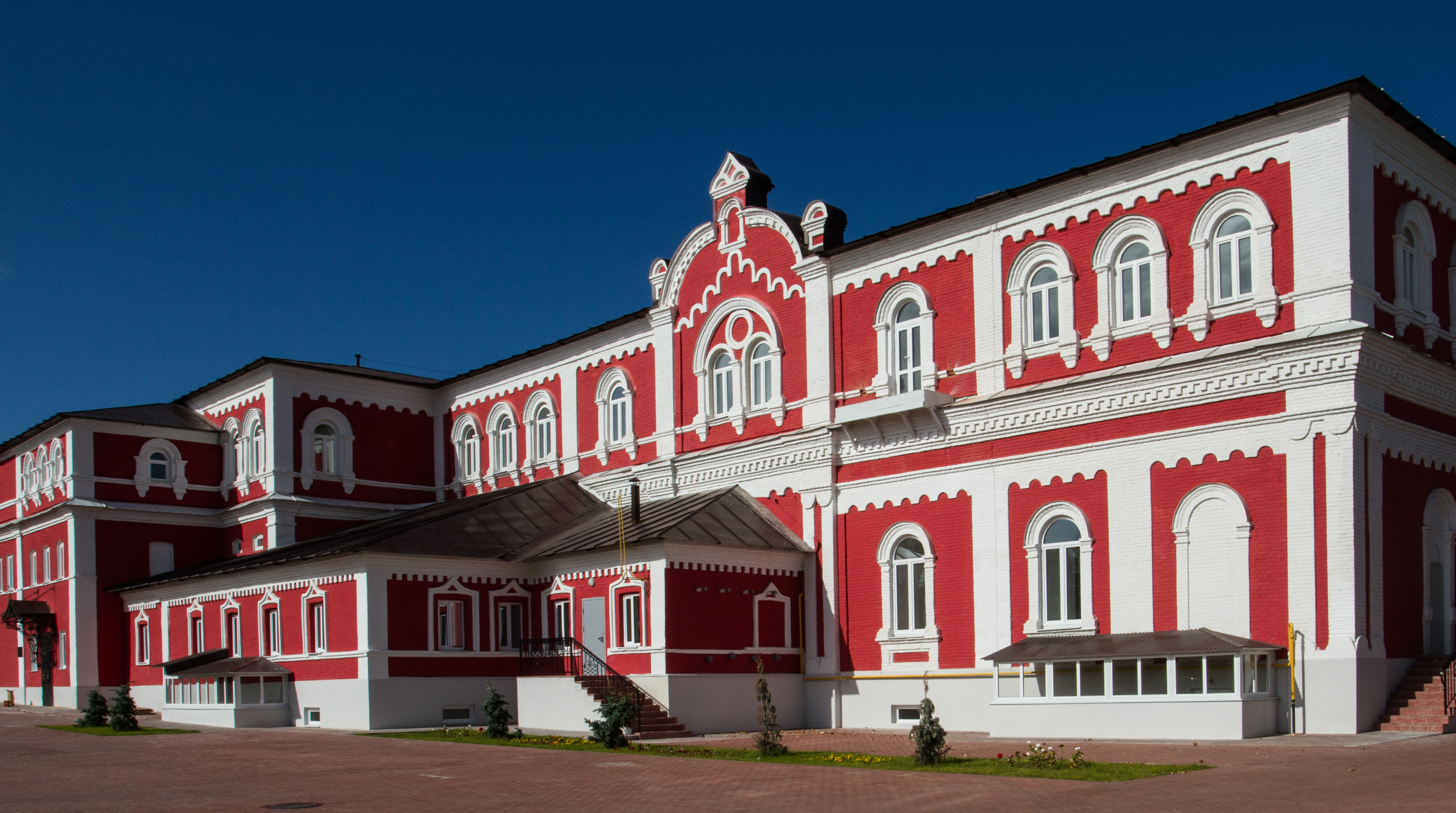

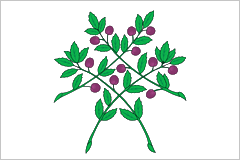
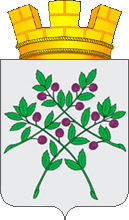
- Flag Coat of arms
- Interactive map of Krasnoslobodsk
- Location of Krasnoslobodsk Krasnoslobodsk (Republic of Mordovia)
- Coordinates: 54°26′N 43°48′E
- Country: Russia
- Federal subject: Mordovia
- Administrative district: Krasnoslobodsky District
- Town of district significanceSelsoviet: Krasnoslobodsk
- Known since: 1571
- Town status since: 1780
- Elevation: 160 m (520 ft)

Population (2010 Census)
  - Total: 10,151
  - Estimate (2021): 8,910 (−12.2%)

Administrative status
  - Capital of: Krasnoslobodsky District, town of district significance of Krasnoslobodsk

Municipal status
  - Municipal district: Krasnoslobodsky Municipal District
  - Urban settlement: Krasnoslobodskoye Urban Settlement
  - Capital of: Krasnoslobodsky Municipal District, Krasnoslobodskoye Urban Settlement
- Time zone: UTC+3 (MSK)
- Postal codes: 431260, 431261, 431289
- OKTMO ID: 89634101001

Krasnoslobodsk population
- 2010 Census: 10,151
- 2002 Census: 10,843
- 1989 Census: 11,261
- 1979 Census: 10,099

Krasnoslobodsk (Russian: Краснослобо́дск; Moksha: Ош, Oš; Erzya: Якстерекуро ош, Jaksterekuro oš) is a town and the administrative center of Krasnoslobodsky District of the Republic of Mordovia, Russia, located on the left bank of the Moksha River (a tributary of the Oka), 107 kilometers (66 mi) west of Saransk, the capital of the republic. As of the 2010 Census, its population was 10,151.

== History ==
It has been known since 1571; town status was granted to it in 1780.

== Administrative and municipal status ==
Within the framework of administrative divisions, Krasnoslobodsk serves as the administrative center of Krasnoslobodsky District. As an administrative division, it is incorporated within Krasnoslobodsky District as the town of district significance of Krasnoslobodsk. As a municipal division, the town of district significance of Krasnoslobodsk is incorporated within Krasnoslobodsky Municipal District as Krasnoslobodskoye Urban Settlement.
