= Dmitry Kuzyakin =

Russian politician

- Дмитрий Кузякин
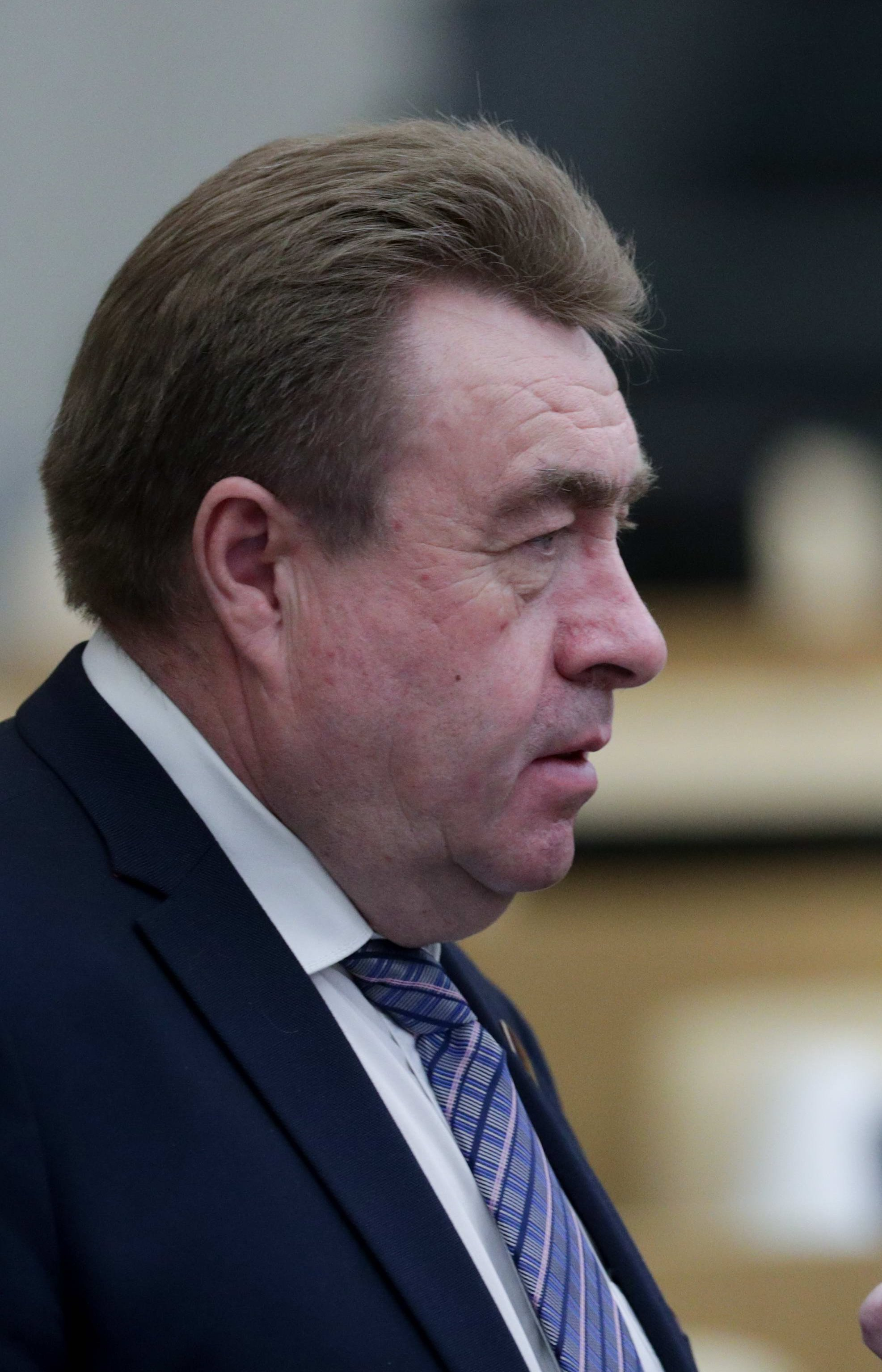

Member of the State Duma
- In office 21 January 2021 – September 2021

Personal details
- Born: Dmitry Viktorovich Kuzyakin; 21 December 1961 (age 64) Vladmir, Soviet Union
- Party: Communist Party of the Russian Federation

Dmitry Viktorovich Kuzyakin (Russian: Дмитрий Викторович Кузякин; born on 21 December 1961) is a Russian politician who is a member of the State Duma of the 7th convocation.

From January 2013 to August 2015, he was a lecturer in the Department of Economics at Moscow State Industrial University. After September 2015, he became an associate professor in the Department of Economics and Customs Affairs of the Institute of World Economy and Information.

On 20 January 2021, Kuzyakin became a member of parliament, a deputy of the State Duma of the 7th convocation, receiving the mandate of Valentin Shurchanov, who died from COVID-19.

Kuzyakin had been the candidate for the 2021 Mordovia head election.
