= Insarsky District =

Insarsky District Инсарский район (Russian)
- District

Other transcription(s)
  - Moksha: Инзаронь аймак
  - Moksha: Инесаро буе
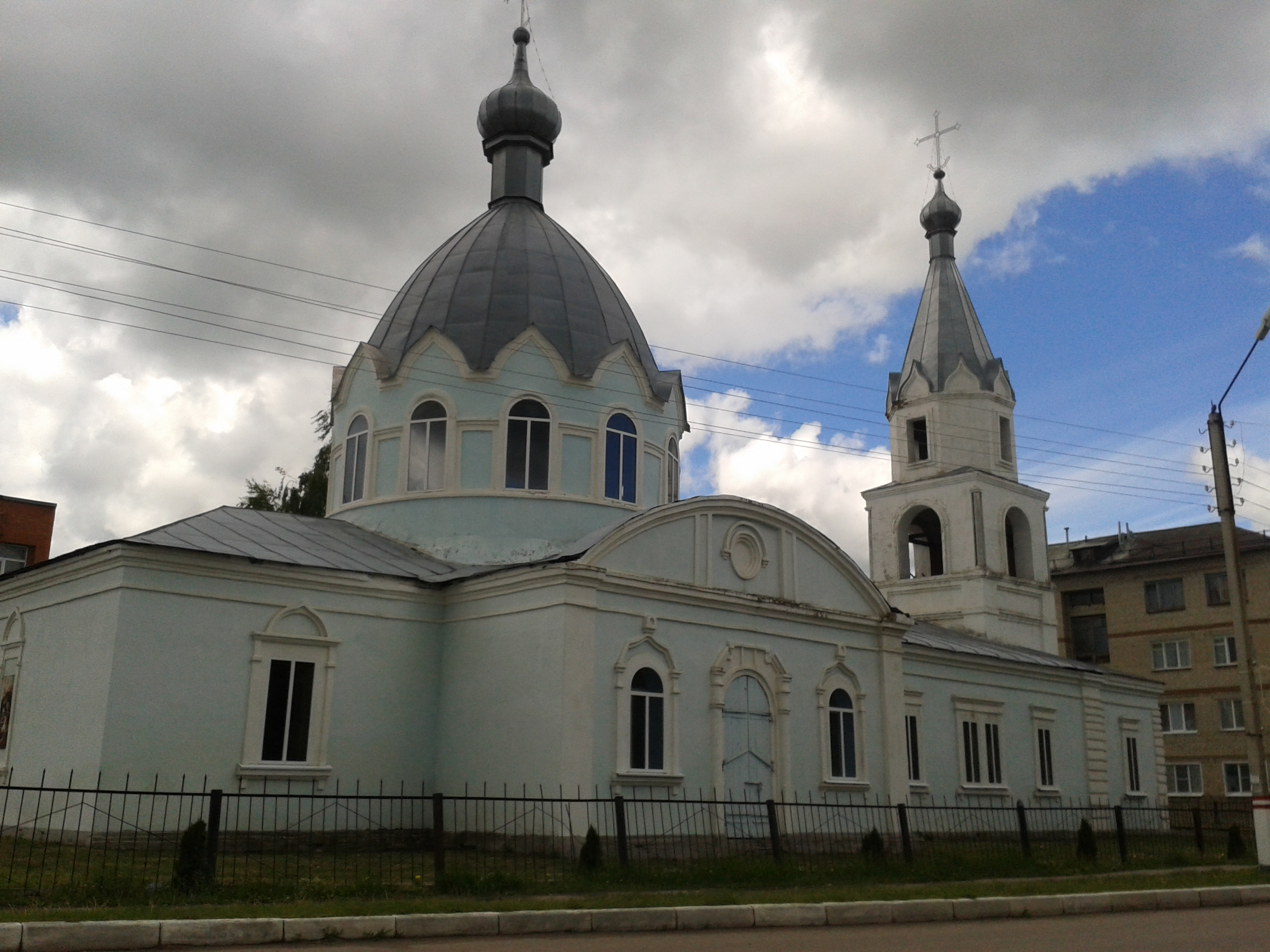
- Christ Church

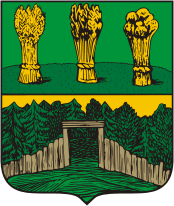
- Coat of arms
- Location of Insarsky District in the Republic of Mordovia
- Coordinates: 53°52′N 44°22′E
- Country: Russia
- Federal subject: Republic of Mordovia
- Established: 16 July 1928
- Administrative center: Insar

Area
  - Total: 968.6 km^{2} (374.0 sq mi)

Population (2010 Census)
  - Total: 14,098
  - Density: 14.56/km^{2} (37.70/sq mi)
  - Urban: 61.6%
  - Rural: 38.4%

Administrative structure
  - Administrative divisions: 1 Towns of district significance, 15 Selsoviets
  - Inhabited localities: 1 cities/towns, 33 rural localities

Municipal structure
  - Municipally incorporated as: Insarsky Municipal District
  - Municipal divisions: 1 urban settlements, 15 rural settlements
- Time zone: UTC+3 (MSK)
- OKTMO ID: 89624000
- Website: http://insar.e-mordovia.ru/

Population of Insarsky District
- 2010 Census: 14,098
- 2002 Census: 15,909
- 1989 Census: 29,638
- 1979 Census: 35,572

Insarsky District (Russian: Инса́рский райо́н; Moksha: Инзаронь аймак, Inzaroń ajmak; Erzya: Инесаро буе, Inesaro buje) is an administrative and municipal district (raion), one of the twenty-two in the Republic of Mordovia, Russia. It is located in the south of the republic. The area of the district is 968.6 square kilometers (374.0 sq mi). Its administrative center is the town of Insar. As of the 2010 Census, the total population of the district was 14,098, with the population of Insar accounting for 61.6% of that number.

== Administrative and municipal status ==
Within the framework of administrative divisions, Insarsky District is one of the twenty-two in the republic. It is divided into one town of district significance (Insar) and fifteen selsoviets, all of which comprise thirty-three rural localities. As a municipal division, the district is incorporated as Insarsky Municipal District. The town of district significance of Insar is incorporated into an urban settlement, and the fifteen selsoviets are incorporated into fifteen rural settlements within the municipal district. The town of Insar serves as the administrative center of both the administrative and municipal district.

== Notable residents ==
- Nikolay Merkushkin (born 1951 in Novye Verkhissy), former Governor of Samara Oblast, former head of the Republic of Mordovia
