= Insar, Insarsky District, Republic of Mordovia =

Town in the Republic of Mordovia, Russia

Insar Инсар
- Town

Other transcription(s)
  - Moksha: Инзара
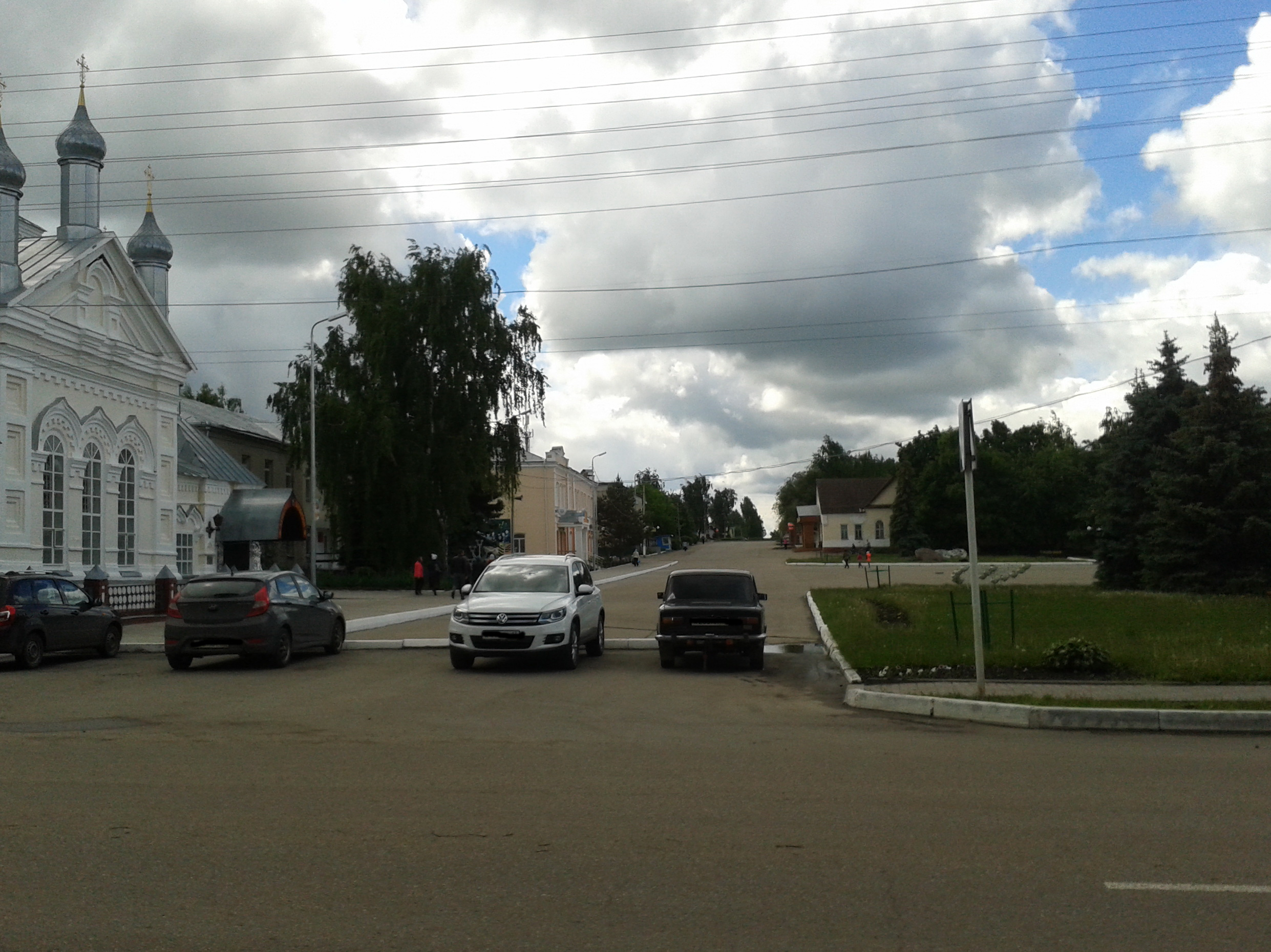

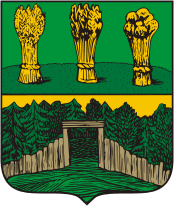
- Coat of arms
- Interactive map of Insar
- Location of Insar Insar (Republic of Mordovia)
- Coordinates: 53°52′N 44°23′E
- Country: Russia
- Federal subject: Mordovia
- Administrative district: Insarsky District
- Town of district significanceSelsoviet: Insar
- Founded: 1648
- Town status since: 1958

Population (2010 Census)
  - Total: 8,687
  - Estimate (2021): 7,920 (−8.8%)

Administrative status
  - Capital of: Insarsky District, town of district significance of Insar

Municipal status
  - Municipal district: Insarsky Municipal District
  - Urban settlement: Insar Urban Settlement
  - Capital of: Insarsky Municipal District, Insar Urban Settlement
- Time zone: UTC+3 (MSK)
- Postal code: 431430
- OKTMO ID: 89624101001

Insar population
- 2010 Census: 8,687
- 2002 Census: 8,951
- 1989 Census: 9,275
- 1979 Census: 9,034

Insar (Russian: Инса́р; Moksha: Инзара, Inzara; Erzya: Инсар ош, Insar oš) is a town and the administrative center of Insarsky District of the Republic of Mordovia, Russia, located at the confluence of the Issa and Insarka Rivers, 77 kilometers (48 mi) southwest of Saransk, the capital of the republic. As of the 2010 Census, its population was 8,687.

== History ==
It was founded in 1648 as a fortress and a posad. Town status was granted to it in 1780; it was demoted to a rural locality in 1926. Town status was re-granted again in 1958.

== Administrative and municipal status ==
Within the framework of administrative divisions, Insar serves as the administrative center of Insarsky District. As an administrative division, it is, together with one rural locality (the settlement of Zarya), incorporated within Insarsky District as the town of district significance of Insar. As a municipal division, the town of district significance of Insar is incorporated within Insarsky Municipal District as Insar Urban Settlement.
