= Krasnoslobodsky District =

Krasnoslobodsky District Краснослободский район (Russian)
- District

Other transcription(s)
  - Moksha: Ошень аймак
  - Erzya: Якстерекуро буе
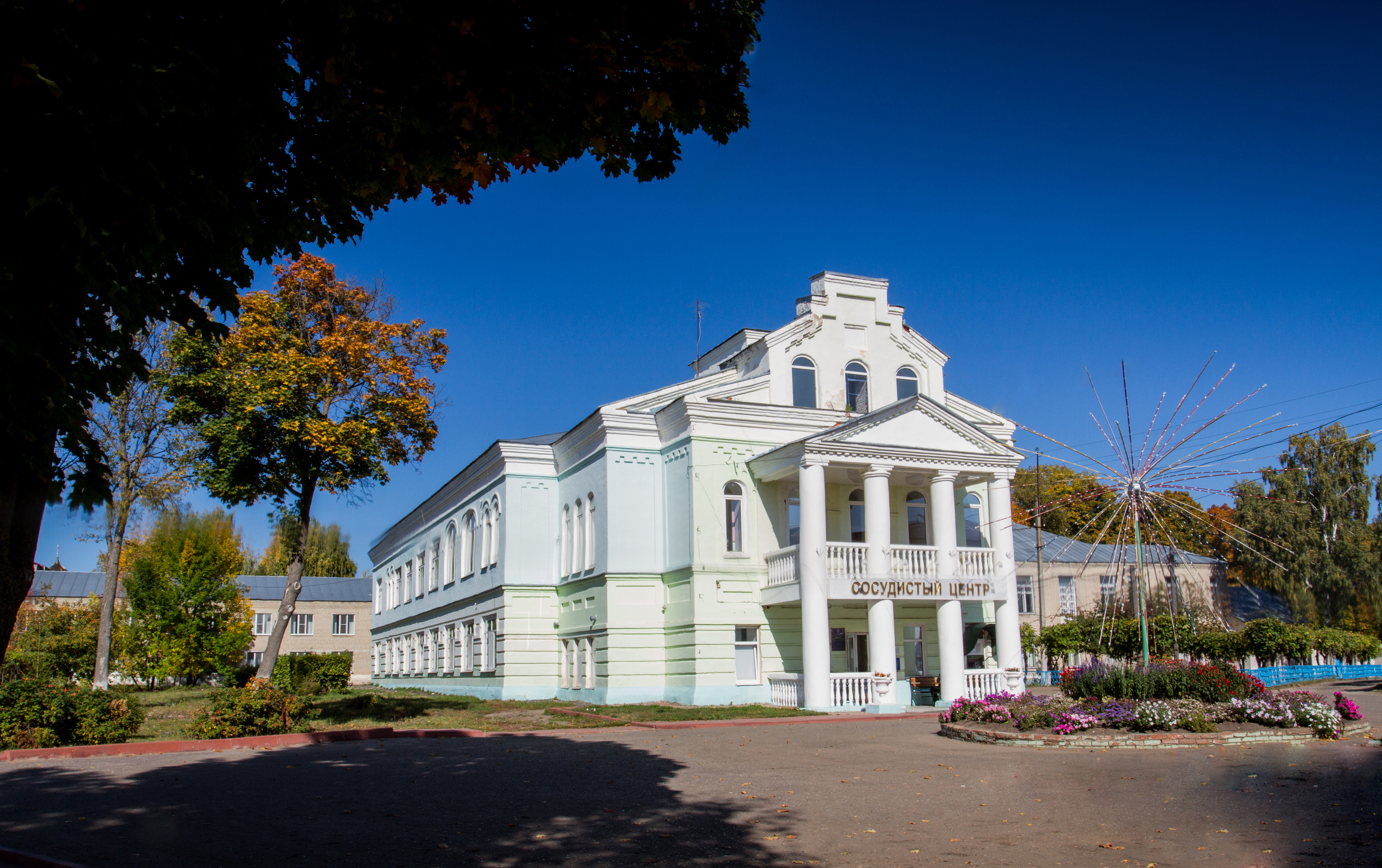
- Housing with home church of Alexander Nevsky, Krasnoslobodsk, Krasnoslobodsky District

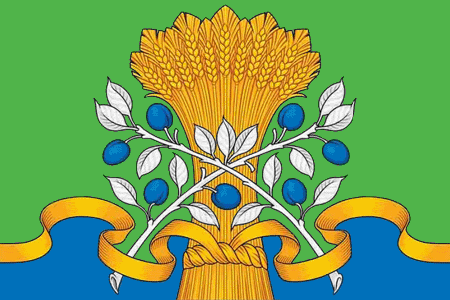
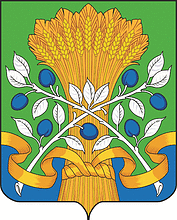
- Flag Coat of arms
- Location of Krasnoslobodsky District in the Republic of Mordovia
- Coordinates: 54°26′N 43°47′E
- Country: Russia
- Federal subject: Republic of Mordovia
- Established: 16 July 1928
- Administrative center: Krasnoslobodsk

Area
  - Total: 1,379.4 km^{2} (532.6 sq mi)

Population (2010 Census)
  - Total: 26,406
  - Density: 19.143/km^{2} (49.580/sq mi)
  - Urban: 38.4%
  - Rural: 61.6%

Administrative structure
  - Administrative divisions: 1 Towns of district significance, 16 Selsoviets
  - Inhabited localities: 1 cities/towns, 70 rural localities

Municipal structure
  - Municipally incorporated as: Krasnoslobodsky Municipal District
  - Municipal divisions: 0 urban settlements, 16 rural settlements
- Time zone: UTC+3 (MSK)
- OKTMO ID: 89634000
- Website: http://krasnoslobodsk.e-mordovia.ru/

Population of Krasnoslobodsky District
- 2010 Census: 26,406
- 2002 Census: 28,703
- 1989 Census: 33,669
- 1979 Census: 39,860

Krasnoslobodsky District (Russian: Краснослобо́дский райо́н; Moksha: Ошень аймак, Ošeń ajmak; Erzya: Якстерекуро буе, Jaksterekuro buje) is an administrative and municipal district (raion), one of the twenty-two in the Republic of Mordovia, Russia. It is located in the center of the republic. The area of the district is 1,379.4 square kilometers (532.6 sq mi). Its administrative center is the town of Krasnoslobodsk. As of the 2010 Census, the total population of the district was 26,406, with the population of Krasnoslobodsk accounting for 38.4% of that number.

== Administrative and municipal status ==
Within the framework of administrative divisions, Krasnoslobodsky District is one of the twenty-two in the republic. It is divided into one town of district significance (Krasnoslobodsk) and sixteen selsoviets, all of which comprise seventy rural localities. As a municipal division, the district is incorporated as Krasnoslobodsky Municipal District. The town of district significance of Krasnoslobodsk is incorporated into an urban settlement, and the sixteen selsoviets are incorporated into sixteen rural settlements within the municipal district. The town of Krasnoslobodsk serves as the administrative center of both the administrative and municipal district.

== Notable residents ==
- Alexander Palm (1822–1885), poet, novelist and playwright born in Krasnoslobodsk
- Vladimir Volkov (born 1954), politician born in Novoye Arakcheyevo
