= Artyom Zdunov =

Russian politician

- Артём Здунов
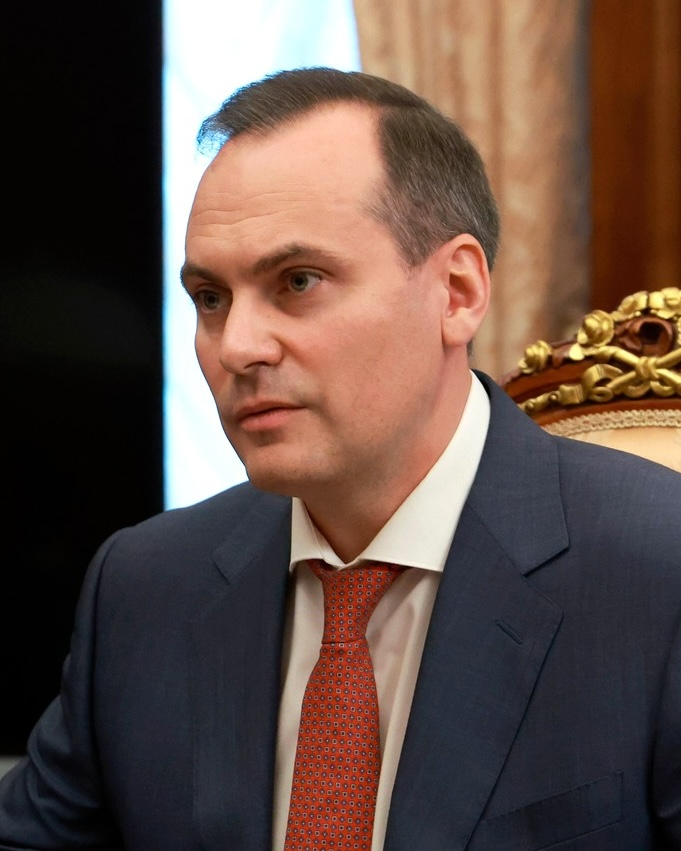
- Zdunov in 2024

3rd Head of the Republic of Mordovia
- Incumbent
- Assumed office 18 November 2020; Acting: until 29 September 2021
- Preceded by: Vladimir Volkov

Chairman of the Government of the Republic of Dagestan
- In office 7 October 2018 – 18 November 2020
- Preceded by: Anatoly Karibov (acting)
- Succeeded by: Abdulpatakh Amirkhanov

Minister of Economy of the Republic of Tatarstan
- In office 14 October 2014 – 7 October 2018
- Preceded by: Midkhat Shagiakhmetov
- Succeeded by: Firad Abdulganiev

Personal details
- Born: Artyom Alekseyevich Zdunov; 18 May 1978 (age 48) Kazan, Tatar ASSR, Russian SFSR, Soviet Union
- Party: United Russia
- Children: 2

Artyom Alekseyevich Zdunov (Russian: Артём Алексеевич Здунов; born 18 May 1978) is a Russian politician, who is currently the 3rd Head of the Republic of Mordovia since 29 September 2021.

== Biography ==
Artyom Zdunov was born in Kazan on 18 May 1978. He is Erzyan by ethnicity.

From 1996 to 1998, he was deputy chairman of the trade union committee of students of Kazan Institute of Finance and Economics (KFEI).

In 2000, he graduated from the KFEI, and in the same place in 2004 in graduate school. He has PhD in Economics since 2005.

From June 2000 to March 2001, he was an insurance specialist, an internal auditor of the Open Joint Stock Insurance Company Industrial Insurance Company.

From April 2004 to July 2006 he taught at the Department of Macroeconomics and Economic Theory of the KFEI.

From July 2006 to May 2010, he held the position of deputy director for Science of the State Institution "Center for Advanced Economic Research of the Academy of Sciences of the Republic of Tatarstan".

Since May 2010, Zdunov was Deputy Minister of Economy of the Republic of Tatarstan.

From 14 October 2014 to 6 February 2018, Zdunov was the Minister of Economy of the Republic of Tatarstan.

On 6 February 2018, the interim head of Dagestan, Vladimir Vasilyev, submitted the candidacy of Zdunov for the post of chairman of the republic's government to parliament. On 7 February 2018, the parliament of Dagestan approved his candidacy.

On 18 November 2020, Zdunov was appointed acting Head of the Republic of Mordovia. He was elected to hold the office formally in September 2021.

== Sanctions ==
On 24 February 2023, the one-year anniversary of the Russian invasion of Ukraine, the US State Department sanctioned Zdunov for overseeing "the conscription of citizens to fight in Ukraine" in his capacity as an official of the Russian government.

On 22 September 2023, Zdunov was sanctioned by Canada, along with other Russian officials, for their involvement "in supporting Russia's forcible mass deportation of Ukrainian children, Russian disinformation campaigns, and its nuclear sector". He is also sanctioned by Australia for similar reasons.

== Personal life ==
Zdunov is married to a Tatar woman and has a son and a daughter.

== Income and property ==
The amount of declared income for 2019 amounted to 7 million 835 thousand rubles. His wife has 578 thousand rubles.
