= State Assembly of the Republic of Mordovia =

Regional parliament of Mordovia, Russia

State Assembly of the Republic of Mordovia Государственное Собрание Республики Мордовия
- 7th legislature

Type
- Type: Unicameral

Leadership
- Chairman: Vladimir Chibirkin, United Russia since 15 December 2011

Structure
- Seats: 48
- Political groups: United Russia (42) CPRF (3); LDPR (2) SRZP (1)

Elections
- Voting system: Mixed
- Last election: 19 September 2021
- Next election: 2026

Meeting place
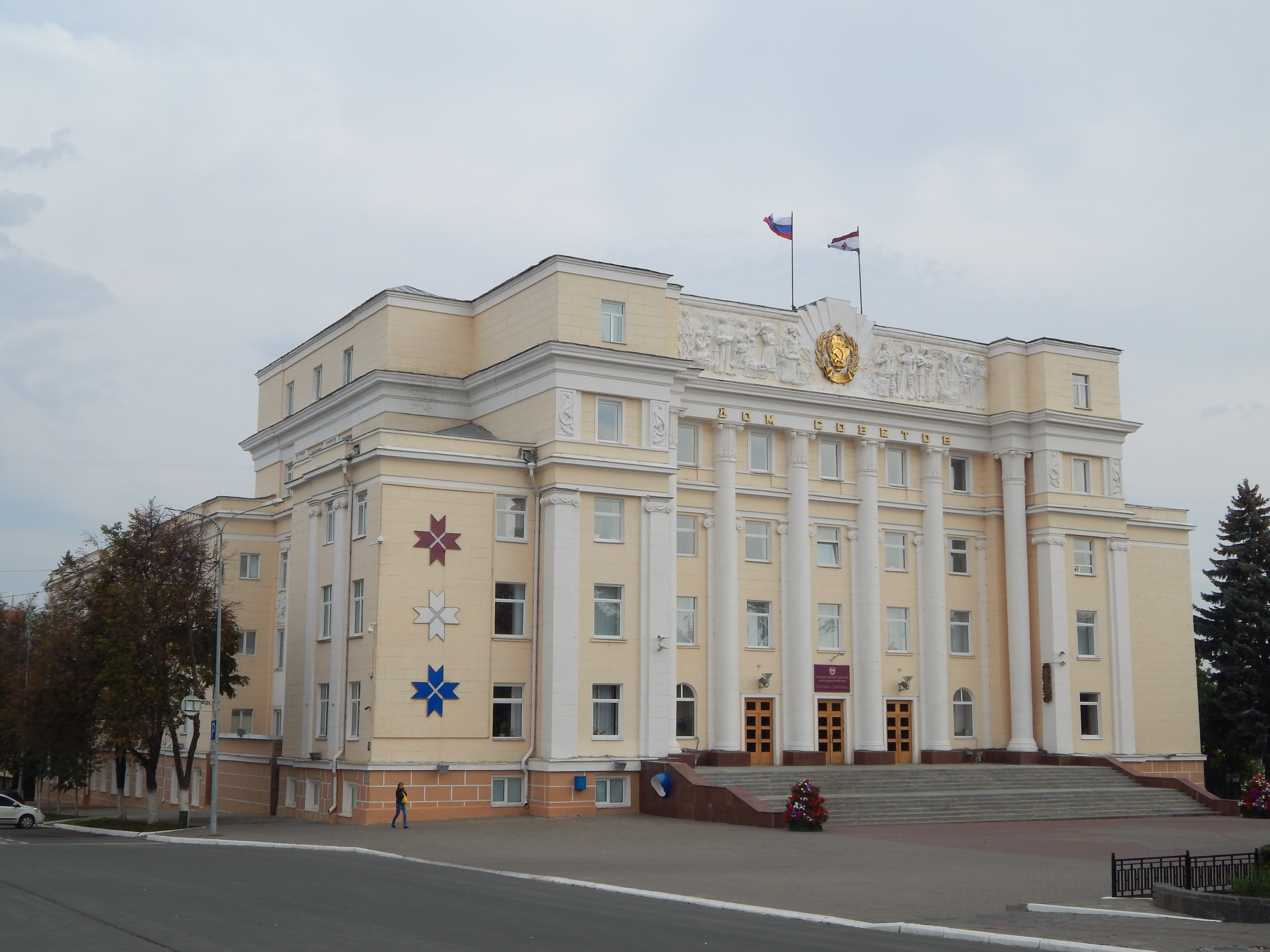
- 26 Sovetskaya Street, Saransk

Website
- gsrm.ru

The State Assembly of the Republic of Mordovia (Note: Russian: Государственное Собрание Республики Мордовия, romanized: Gosudarstvennoye Sobraniye Respubliki Mordoviya; Moksha: Государственнай Собраниясь Мордовия Республикань; Erzya: Государственной Собраниясь Мордовия Республикань) is the regional parliament of Mordovia, a federal subject of Russia. A total of 48 deputies are elected for five-year terms.

Its members elect the head of the Republic of Mordovia for a period of five years.

== Elections ==
=== 2016 ===
Party	%	Seats
United Russia	83.70	45
Communist Party of the Russian Federation	6.21	1
Liberal Democratic Party of Russia	5.85	1
Self-nominated	—	1
Registered voters/turnout	82.61	

=== 2021 ===
Party	%	Seats
United Russia	67.21	42
Communist Party of the Russian Federation	14.19	3
Liberal Democratic Party of Russia	9.85	2
A Just Russia — For Truth	6.77	1
Registered voters/turnout	64.62	

== List of chairmen ==
=== Supreme Council ===
Name	Entered office	Left office
Nikolay Biryukov	December 1990	January 24, 1995

=== State Assembly ===
Name	Entered office	Left office
Nikolay Merkushkin	January 24, 1995	September 22, 1995
Valery Kechkin	October 5, 1995	February 18, 2010
Valentin Konakov (acting)	2010	2011
Vladimir Chibirkin	2011	Present
