= Mordovian State University =

School in Saransk, Russia

National Research Mordovia State University
- Национальный исследовательский Мордовский государственный университет имени Н. П. Огарёва
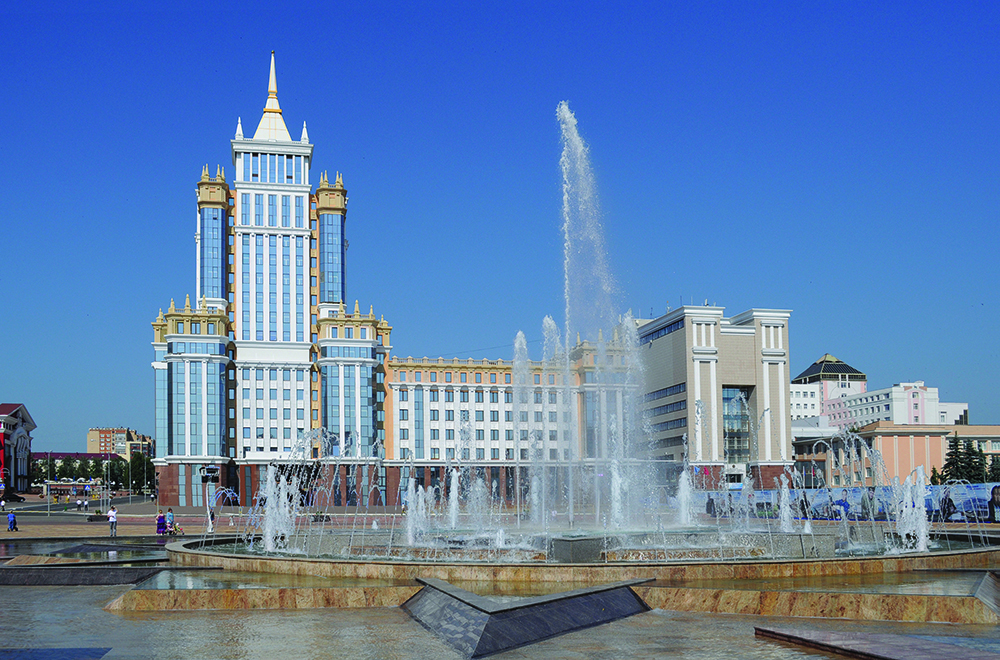
- Established: 1931
- Location: 68 Bolshevitskaya Street, Saransk, Mordovia, 430005, Russia; 54°11′14″N 45°10′53″E
- Colors
- Website: mrsu.ru/en/

University rankings

Regional – Overall
- QS Emerging Europe and Central Asia: 221-230 (2022)

N.P. Ogarev Mordovia State University (Russian: Национальный исследовательский Мордовский государственный университет имени Н. П. Огарёва) is a public university located in the city of Saransk in the Republic of Mordovia, Russia. The university offers bachelor's and master's degrees in various academic fields.

== History ==
The Agronomy Pedagogical Institute, also known as the Mordovia State Pedagogical Institute, was founded on 1 October 1931. In October 1957, it was reorganized as Mordovia State University also known as Ogarev Mordovia State University. It achieved national research university status on 20 May 2010.

== Teaching formats ==
The courses are available in the form of full-time education, evening (part-time) curriculum, and correspondence education (6 years). The medical faculty offers 6 and 7-year programs of study.

== Student body ==
The total student body numbers approximately 28,000 students, including international students from countries like India, Pakistan, Bangladesh, Kuwait, Oman, Iran, Iraq, Saudi, UAE and few African countries.

== Units ==
Academic disciplines are offered through following academic structural units:

=== Academic department ===
- Biology,
- Medicine,
- Philology,
- Foreign Languages (English, German, French),
- Geography,
- Law / Jurisprudence,
- Economics,
- National (Mordvin) Culture,
- Civil Engineering and Building Constructions,
- Lighting Technology,
- Electronics,
- Academic Skills College,
- Math and IT.

=== Colleges (institutes) ===
- Physics and Chemistry Institute
- History and Sociology Institute
- Mechanics and Power Engineering Institute
- Agrarian Institute
- Machine Building Institute (Ruzayevka campus)
- Institute for Supplementary Training and Qualification Improvement with

A range of related faculties are grouped within the Inter-branch Regional Centre for Supplementary Training.

In addition, University divisions in other towns of Mordovia provide for educating facilities in Economics and Law Studies.
