= Administrative divisions of Mordovia =

Mordovia Russia
- Capital: Saransk

Administrative structure (as of 2014)
- Districts: 22
- Cities/towns: 7
- Urban-type settlements: 13
- Selsovets: 344

Municipal structure (as of 2002)
- Rural settlements: 1,313 (inhabited); 29 (uninhabited)

Mordovia is a republic of Russia. It is divided into 22 districts called raions. The city of Saransk is administrated separately from the districts as an urban okrug.

== Administrative and municipal divisions ==
Map

Division		Structure		OKATO	OKTMO	Urban-type settlement/ district-level town*	Rural (selsovet)
Division		Administrative	Municipal	OKATO	OKTMO	Urban-type settlement/ district-level town*	Rural (selsovet)
Saransk (Саранск)		city	urban okrug	89 401	89 701		
↳	Leninsky (Ленинский)	(under Saransk)	—N/a	89 401	—N/a		
↳	Oktyabrsky (Октябрьский)	(under Saransk)	—N/a	89 401	—N/a	Lukhovka (Луховка); Nikolayevka (Николаевка); Yalga (Ялга)	4
↳	Proletarsky	(under Saransk)	—N/a	89 401	—N/a		
Kovylkino (Ковылкино)		city	(under Kovylkinsky)	89 410	89 629		
Ruzayevka (Рузаевка)		city	(under Ruzayevsky)	89 420	89 643		
Ardatovsky (Ардатовский)		district		89 203	89 603	Ardatov (Ардатов) town*; Turgenevo (Тургенево)	21
Atyuryevsky (Атюрьевский)		district		89 205	89 605		11
Atyashevsky (Атяшевский)		district		89 207	89 607	Atyashevo (Атяшево)	18
Bolshebereznikovsky (Большеберезниковский)		district		89 210	89 610		15
Bolsheignatovsky (Большеигнатовский)		district		89 213	89 613		12
Dubyonsky (Дубёнский)		district		89 216	89 616		16
Yelnikovsky (Ельниковский)		district		89 218	89 618		13
Zubovo-Polyansky (Зубово-Полянский)		district		89 221	89 621	Potma (Потьма); Umyot (Умёт); Yavas (Явас); Zubova Polyana (Зубова Поляна)	26
Insarsky (Инсарский)		district		89 224	89 624	Insar (Инсар) town*	15
Ichalkovsky (Ичалковский)		district		89 226	89 626		14
Kadoshkinsky (Кадошкинский)		district		89 228	89 628	Kadoshkino (Кадошкино)	6
Kovylkinsky (Ковылкинский)		district		89 229	89 629		21
Kochkurovsky (Кочкуровский)		district		89 231	89 631		11
Krasnoslobodsky (Краснослободский)		district		89 234	89 634	Krasnoslobodsk (Краснослободск) town*	16
Lyambirsky (Лямбирский)		district		89 237	89 637		16
Romodanovsky (Ромодановский)		district		89 240	89 640		17
Ruzayevsky (Рузаевский)		district		89 243	89 643		20
Staroshaygovsky (Старошайговский)		district		89 246	89 646		17
Temnikovsky (Темниковский)		district		89 249	89 649	Temnikov (Темников) town*	18
Tengushevsky (Теньгушевский)		district		89 251	89 651		10
Torbeyevsky (Торбеевский)		district		89 254	89 654	Torbeyevo (Торбеево)	15
Chamzinsky (Чамзинский)		district		89 257	89 657	Chamzinka (Чамзинка); Komsomolsky (Комсомольский)	12
