= Atyashevo =

Atyashevo (Russian: Атяшево) is the name of several inhabited localities in Russia.

Urban localities

- Atyashevo, Atyashevsky District, Republic of Mordovia, a work settlement in Atyashevsky District of the Republic of Mordovia; 54°36′N 46°5′E

Rural localities

- Atyashevo, Republic of Bashkortostan, a selo in Balyklinsky Selsoviet of Fyodorovsky District in the Republic of Bashkortostan; 53°3′N 55°16′E
- Atyashevo, Atyashevsky Selsoviet, Atyashevsky District, Republic of Mordovia, a selo in Atyashevsky Selsoviet of Atyashevsky District in the Republic of Mordovia; 54°36′N 46°8′E
- Atyashevo, Bolsheignatovsky District, Republic of Mordovia, a selo in Spassky Selsoviet of Bolsheignatovsky District in the Republic of Mordovia; 55°10′N 45°40′E
