= Pushkino, Russia =

Pushkino (Russian: Пушкино) is the name of several inhabited localities in Russia.

== Altai Krai ==
As of 2010, one rural locality in Altai Krai bears this name:

- Pushkino, Altai Krai, a settlement in Rubtsovsky Selsoviet of Rubtsovsky District

== Amur Oblast ==
As of 2010, one rural locality in Amur Oblast bears this name:

- Pushkino, Amur Oblast, a selo in Limannovsky Rural Settlement of Seryshevsky District

== Astrakhan Oblast ==
As of 2010, one rural locality in Astrakhan Oblast bears this name:

- Pushkino, Astrakhan Oblast, a settlement in Krivobuzansky Selsoviet of Krasnoyarsky District

== Republic of Bashkortostan ==
As of 2012, two rural localities in the Republic of Bashkortostan bear this name:

- Pushkino, Blagoveshchensky District, a village in Bedeyevo-Polyansky Selsoviet of Blagoveshchensky District
- Pushkino, Nurimanovsky District, a village in Krasnoklyuchevsky Selsoviet of Nurimanovsky District

== Bryansk Oblast ==
As of 2010, two rural localities in Bryansk Oblast bear this name:

- Pushkino, Kletnyansky District, a village in Novotroitsky Selsoviet of Kletnyansky District
- Pushkino, Sevsky District, a selo in Pushkinsky Selsoviet of Sevsky District

== Kaliningrad Oblast ==
As of 2010, three rural localities in Kaliningrad Oblast bear this name:

- Pushkino, Bagrationovsky District, a settlement in Dolgorukovsky Rural Okrug of Bagrationovsky District
- Pushkino, Nemansky District, a settlement in Zhilinsky Rural Okrug of Nemansky District
- Pushkino, Nesterovsky District, a settlement in Prigorodny Rural Okrug of Nesterovsky District

== Kaluga Oblast ==
As of 2010, four rural localities in Kaluga Oblast bear this name:

- Pushkino, Iznoskovsky District, Kaluga Oblast, a village in Iznoskovsky District
- Pushkino, Medynsky District, Kaluga Oblast, a village in Medynsky District
- Pushkino, Peremyshlsky District, Kaluga Oblast, a village in Peremyshlsky District
- Pushkino, Yukhnovsky District, Kaluga Oblast, a village in Yukhnovsky District

== Kemerovo Oblast ==
As of 2010, three rural localities in Kemerovo Oblast bear this name:

- Pushkino, Mezhdurechensky District, Kemerovo Oblast, a settlement in Sosnovskaya Rural Territory of Mezhdurechensky District
- Pushkino, Novokuznetsky District, Kemerovo Oblast, a settlement in Burlakovskaya Rural Territory of Novokuznetsky District
- Pushkino, Prokopyevsky District, Kemerovo Oblast, a village in Pushkinskaya Rural Territory of Prokopyevsky District

== Khabarovsk Krai ==
As of 2010, one rural locality in Khabarovsk Krai bears this name:

- Pushkino, Khabarovsk Krai, a selo in Bikinsky District

== Kirov Oblast ==
As of 2010, one rural locality in Kirov Oblast bears this name:

- Pushkino, Kirov Oblast, a village in Nikolsky Rural Okrug of Yaransky District

== Kostroma Oblast ==
As of 2010, one rural locality in Kostroma Oblast bears this name:

- Pushkino, Kostroma Oblast, a village in Minskoye Settlement of Kostromskoy District

== Krasnoyarsk Krai ==
As of 2010, one rural locality in Krasnoyarsk Krai bears this name:

- Pushkino, Krasnoyarsk Krai, a village in Turovsky Selsoviet of Abansky District

== Kurgan Oblast ==
As of 2010, one rural locality in Kurgan Oblast bears this name:

- Pushkino, Kurgan Oblast, a selo in Pushkinsky Selsoviet of Kurtamyshsky District

== Leningrad Oblast ==
As of 2010, one rural locality in Leningrad Oblast bears this name:

- Pushkino, Leningrad Oblast, a village in Osminskoye Settlement Municipal Formation of Luzhsky District

== Lipetsk Oblast ==
As of 2010, one rural locality in Lipetsk Oblast bears this name:

- Pushkino, Lipetsk Oblast, a selo in Pushkinsky Selsoviet of Dobrinsky District

== Republic of Mordovia ==
As of 2010, four rural localities in the Republic of Mordovia bear this name:

- Pushkino, Saransk, Republic of Mordovia, a settlement under the administrative jurisdiction of the work settlement of Nikolayevka, under the administrative jurisdiction of the city of republic significance of Saransk
- Pushkino, Kadoshkinsky District, Republic of Mordovia, a selo in Pushkinsky Selsoviet of Kadoshkinsky District
- Pushkino, Romodanovsky District, Republic of Mordovia, a selo in Pushkinsky Selsoviet of Romodanovsky District
- Pushkino, Ruzayevsky District, Republic of Mordovia, a selo in Trusklyaysky Selsoviet of Ruzayevsky District

== Moscow Oblast ==
As of 2010, seven inhabited localities in Moscow Oblast bear this name:

- Pushkino, Pushkinsky District, Moscow Oblast, a city in Pushkinsky District
- Pushkino, Domodedovo, Moscow Oblast, a rural locality (a village) under the administrative jurisdiction of the Domodedovo Town Under Oblast Jurisdiction
- Pushkino, Leninsky District, Moscow Oblast, a rural locality (a village) in Filimonkovskoye Rural Settlement of Leninsky District
- Pushkino, Mozhaysky District, Moscow Oblast, a rural locality (a village) in Sputnik Rural Settlement of Mozhaysky District, Moscow Oblast
- Pushkino, Noginsky District, Moscow Oblast, a rural locality (a village) in Stepanovskoye Rural Settlement of Noginsky District
- Pushkino, Ramensky District, Moscow Oblast, a rural locality (a village) in Konstantinovskoye Rural Settlement of Ramensky District
- Pushkino, Voskresensky District, Moscow Oblast, a rural locality (a village) in Ashitkovskoye Rural Settlement of Voskresensky District

== Nizhny Novgorod Oblast ==
As of 2010, one rural locality in Nizhny Novgorod Oblast bears this name:

- Pushkino, Nizhny Novgorod Oblast, a settlement in Petrovsky Selsoviet of Pervomaysky District

== Omsk Oblast ==
As of 2010, two rural localities in Omsk Oblast bear this name:

- Pushkino, Krutinsky District, Omsk Oblast, a village in Oglukhinsky Rural Okrug of Krutinsky District
- Pushkino, Omsky District, Omsk Oblast, a selo in Pushkinsky Rural Okrug of Omsky District

== Oryol Oblast ==
As of 2010, one rural locality in Oryol Oblast bears this name:

- Pushkino, Oryol Oblast, a village in Uspensky Selsoviet of Krasnozorensky District

== Primorsky Krai ==
As of 2010, one rural locality in Primorsky Krai bears this name:

- Pushkino, Primorsky Krai, a selo under the administrative jurisdiction of Ussuriysk City Under Krai Jurisdiction

== Ryazan Oblast ==
As of 2010, one rural locality in Ryazan Oblast bears this name:

- Pushkino, Ryazan Oblast, a selo in Konoplinsky Rural Okrug of Ukholovsky District

== Saratov Oblast ==
As of 2010, one urban locality in Saratov Oblast bears this name:

- Pushkino, Saratov Oblast, a work settlement in Sovetsky District

== Smolensk Oblast ==
As of 2010, two rural localities in Smolensk Oblast bear this name:

- Pushkino, Safonovsky District, Smolensk Oblast, a village in Pushkinskoye Rural Settlement of Safonovsky District
- Pushkino, Vyazemsky District, Smolensk Oblast, a village in Isakovskoye Rural Settlement of Vyazemsky District

== Tula Oblast ==
As of 2010, two rural localities in Tula Oblast bear this name:

- Pushkino, Aleksinsky District, Tula Oblast, a selo in Michurinsky Rural Okrug of Aleksinsky District
- Pushkino, Shchyokinsky District, Tula Oblast, a village in Lipovskaya Rural Administration of Shchyokinsky District

== Tver Oblast ==
As of 2010, two rural localities in Tver Oblast bear this name:

- Pushkino, Kalininsky District, Tver Oblast, a selo in Kalininsky District
- Pushkino, Kashinsky District, Tver Oblast, a village in Kashinsky District

== Vologda Oblast ==
As of 2010, three rural localities in Vologda Oblast bear this name:

- Pushkino, Glushkovsky Selsoviet, Belozersky District, Vologda Oblast, a village in Glushkovsky Selsoviet of Belozersky District
- Pushkino, Gorodishchensky Selsoviet, Belozersky District, Vologda Oblast, a village in Gorodishchensky Selsoviet of Belozersky District
- Pushkino, Cherepovetsky District, Vologda Oblast, a village in Ilyinsky Selsoviet of Cherepovetsky District

== Yaroslavl Oblast ==
As of 2010, one rural locality in Yaroslavl Oblast bears this name:

- Pushkino, Yaroslavl Oblast, a village in Latskovsky Rural Okrug of Nekouzsky District
