= Anayevo =

Anayevo Анаю
- Village

Moksha transcription(s)
  - Cyrillic: Анаю
  - Romanization: Anaju
  - IPA: [ɑ'nɑju]
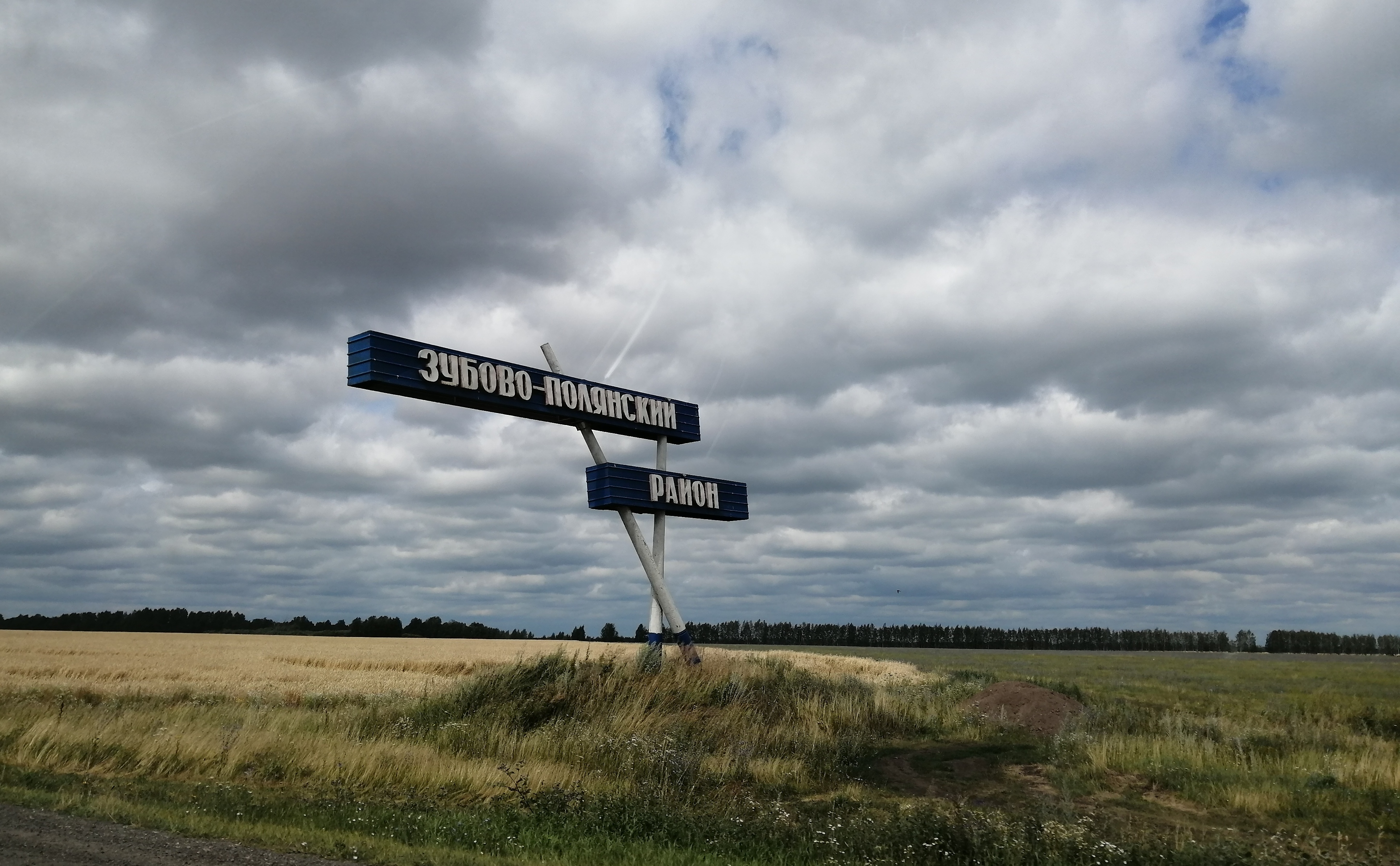
- Etymology: Moksha: Анай, romanized: Anai (name)
- Location within Republic of Mordovia Location within Russia
- Coordinates: 54°23′N 42°55′E
- Country: Russia
- Region: Mordovia
- District: Zubovo-Polyansky District
- Anayu: c 16th century
- Founder: Anai

Government
  - Type: Rural Locality Office
  - Body: Head of Rural Locality Office
- Elevation: 103 m (338 ft)

Population (2010)
  - Total: 367
- Moksha speakers
- Demonym(s): Moksha: Анаюфне, romanized: Anayufnä
- Time zone: UTC+3:00
- Postal code: 431134
- Website: zpolyana.e-mordovia.ru/vill/view/305

Anayevo (Russian: Анаево; Moksha: Анаю, romanized: Anaju) is a rural locality (a selo), administrative centre of Anayevskoye Rural Locality of Zubovo-Polyansky District, Mordovia, Russia.

== Etymology ==
The name derived from pre-Christian Moksha name Anai.

== History ==
Mentioned in 1614 among 9 villages of Steldema belyak together with "Pashatova, Shapkino, Podlyasova, Selische, Paramzina, Zheravkina, Kargashina, 1/2 Avdalova".

== Geography ==
Anayevo is located 29 km of Zubova Polyana (the district's administrative centre) by road and 12 km of Vad railawaystation.

== Sources ==
- Kevbrin, B. F.; Rogachev, V. I.; Shuli︠a︡ev, A. D. (2012). Motivy rodimoĭ zemli : dukhovnai︠a︡ kulʹtura zhiteleĭ Zubovo-Poli︠a︡nskogo raĭona Respubliki Mordovii︠a︡ : khrestomatii︠a︡ narodnoĭ kulʹtury. Saransk: Krasnyĭ Okti︠a︡brʹ. ISBN 978-5-7493-1648-3. OCLC 844176424.
