= Umet (inhabited locality) =

Umet (Russian: Умет) or Umyot (Умёт) is the name of several inhabited localities in Russia.

Urban localities

- Umyot, Republic of Mordovia, a work settlement in Zubovo-Polyansky District of the Republic of Mordovia
- Umyot, Tambov Oblast, a work settlement under the administrative jurisdiction of Umyotsky Settlement Council in Umyotsky District of Tambov Oblast

Rural localities

- Umet, Penza Oblast, a village in Rakhmanovsky Selsoviet of Vadinsky District of Penza Oblast
- Umet, Saratov Oblast, a selo in Atkarsky District of Saratov Oblast
- Umet, Volgograd Oblast, a selo in Umetovsky Selsoviet of Kamyshinsky District of Volgograd Oblast
