= Atyashevsky =

Atyashevsky (masculine), Atyashevskaya (feminine), or Atyashevskoye (neuter) may refer to:

- Atyashevsky District, a district of the Republic of Mordovia, Russia
- Atyashevskoye Urban Settlement, a municipal formation into which Atyashevo Work Settlement in Atyashevsky District of the Republic of Mordovia, Russia is incorporated
