= Potma =

Potma (Russian: Потьма) is the name of several inhabited localities in Russia.

Urban localities

- Potma, Zubovo-Polyansky District, Republic of Mordovia, a work settlement in Zubovo-Polyansky District of the Republic of Mordovia; 54°7′N 42°55′E

Rural localities

- Potma, Atyuryevsky District, Republic of Mordovia, a village in Mordovsko-Kozlovsky Selsoviet of Atyuryevsky District in the Republic of Mordovia; 54°28′N 43°17′E
- Potma, Kovylkinsky District, Republic of Mordovia, a settlement in Troitsky Selsoviet of Kovylkinsky District in the Republic of Mordovia; 54°4′N 43°43′E
- Potma, Penza Oblast, a selo in Shirokoissky Selsoviet of Mokshansky District in Penza Oblast
- Potma, Arkadaksky District, Saratov Oblast, a village in Arkadaksky District of Saratov Oblast
- Potma, Rtishchevsky District, Saratov Oblast, a railway crossing loop in Rtishchevsky District of Saratov Oblast
- Potma, Rtishchevsky District, Saratov Oblast, a selo in Rtishchevsky District of Saratov Oblast
- Potma, Ulyanovsk Oblast, a selo in Valdivatsky Rural Okrug of Karsunsky District in Ulyanovsk Oblast
