= Zubovo-Polyansky =

Zubovo-Polyansky (masculine), Zubovo-Polyanskaya (feminine), or Zubovo-Polyanskoye (neuter) may refer to:

- Zubovo-Polyansky District, a district of the Republic of Mordovia, Russia
- Zubovo-Polyanskoye Urban Settlement, a municipal formation into which Zubova Polyana Work Settlement in Zubovo-Polyansky District of the Republic of Mordovia, Russia is incorporated
