= Kadoshkinsky =

Kadoshkinsky (masculine), Kadoshkinskaya (feminine), or Kadoshkinskoye (neuter) may refer to:

- Kadoshkinsky District, a district of the Republic of Mordovia, Russia
- Kadoshkinskoye Urban Settlement, a municipal formation into which Kadoshkino Work Settlement in Kadoshkinsky District of the Republic of Mordovia, Russia is incorporated
