= Umyotsky =

Umyotsky (masculine), Umyotskaya (feminine), or Umyotskoye (neuter) may refer to:

- Umyotsky District, a district of Tambov Oblast, Russia
- Umyotsky Urban Settlement, a municipal formation into which Umyotsky Settlement Council in Umyotsky District of Tambov Oblast, Russia is incorporated
- Umyotskoye Urban Settlement, a municipal formation into which Umyot Work Settlement in Zubovo-Polyansky District of the Republic of Mordovia, Russia is incorporated
