= Podlyasovo =

Podlyasovo Польдяз
- Village

Moksha transcription(s)
  - Cyrillic: Польдяз
  - Romanization: Poĺdäz
  - IPA: ['polʲdʲæs]
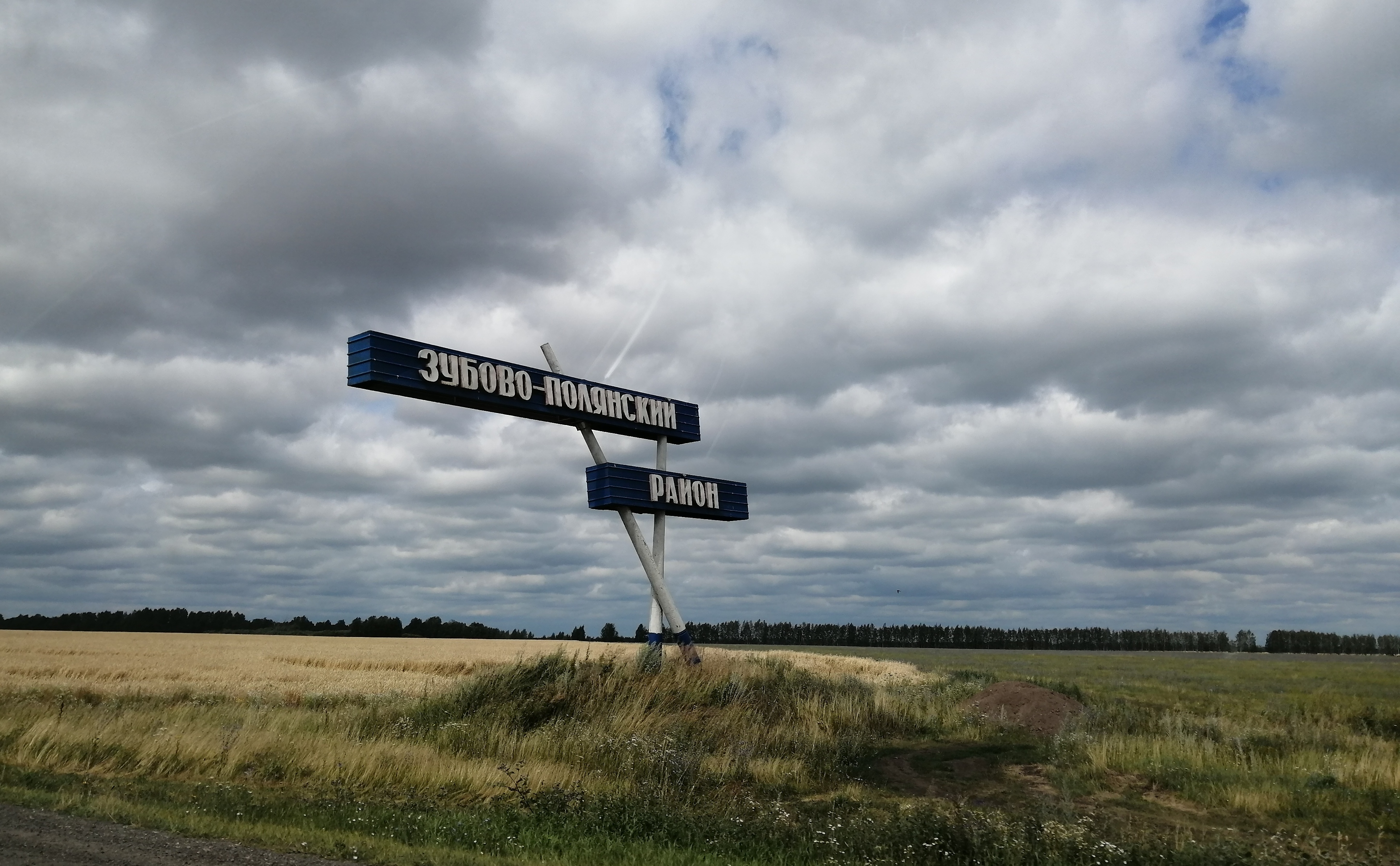
- Etymology: Moksha: Польдяз, romanized: Poldyas, lit. 'Poldya's place'
- Location within Republic of Mordovia Location within Russia
- Coordinates: 54°18′N 42°40′E
- Country: Russia
- Region: Mordovia
- District: Zubovo-Polyansky District
- Founded: c 15th century
- Founder: Poldia

Government
  - Type: Rural locality Office

Population (2012)
  - Total: 93
- Moksha speakers
- Time zone: UTC+3:00

Podlyasovo (Russian: Подлясово; Moksha: Польдяз, romanized: Poĺdäz, older name Moksha: Польдязонь кужа, romanized: Poĺdäzoń kuža, lit. 'Poldya's glade') is a rural locality (a village), in Anayevskaya rural Locality of Zubovo-Polyansky District, Mordovia, Russia.

== Etymology ==
Pre-Christian Moksha male name Poldya or Polda was the name of the founder.

== History ==
Mentioned in 1614 among 9 villages of Steldema belyak together with "Anayeva, Shapkino, Poshatova, Selische, Paramzina, Zheravkina, Kargashina, 1/2 Avdalova".

== Geography ==
Podlyasovo is located on Vad river, in 18 km from M5 highway in 45 km from Zubova Polyana (the district's administrative centre), and 35 km of by road and 22 km of Vad (station).

== Sources ==
- Inzhevatov, Ivan; Nikonov, Vladimir (1987). Топонимический словарь Мордовской АССР [Toponymic Dictionary Of Mordvin Autonomous Republic] (in Russian). Mordovian Book Publishing.
