= Yelniki =

Yelniki (Russian: Ельники) is the name of several rural localities in Russia:-

- Yelniki, Kaliningrad Oblast, a settlement in Kaliningrad Oblast
- Yelniki, Republic of Mordovia, a selo in the Republic of Mordovia
- Yelniki, name of several other rural localities
