= Umet =

Umet or Umyot may refer to:

- Umet (inhabited locality) (Umyot), several inhabited localities in Russia
- Metropolitan University (Puerto Rico), a university system in Puerto Rico now merged into Ana G. Méndez University
- Turkish Space Systems, Integration and Test Center (Uydu Montaj Entegrasyon ve Test), a spacecraft production and testing facility in Turkey
