= Potminsky =

Potminsky (masculine), Potminskaya (feminine), or Potminskoye (neuter) may refer to:

- Potminskoye Urban Settlement, a municipal formation into which Potma Work Settlement in Zubovo-Polyansky District of the Republic of Mordovia, Russia is incorporated
- Potminsky (rural locality), a rural locality (a settlement) in Mokshansky District of Penza Oblast, Russia
