= Bolshiye Mordovskiye Poshaty =

Bolshiye Mordovskiye Poshaty Пошаду веле
- Village

Moksha transcription(s)
  - Cyrillic: Пошаду веле
  - Romanization: Pošadu vele
  - IPA: [po'ʃɑdu 'velʲæ]
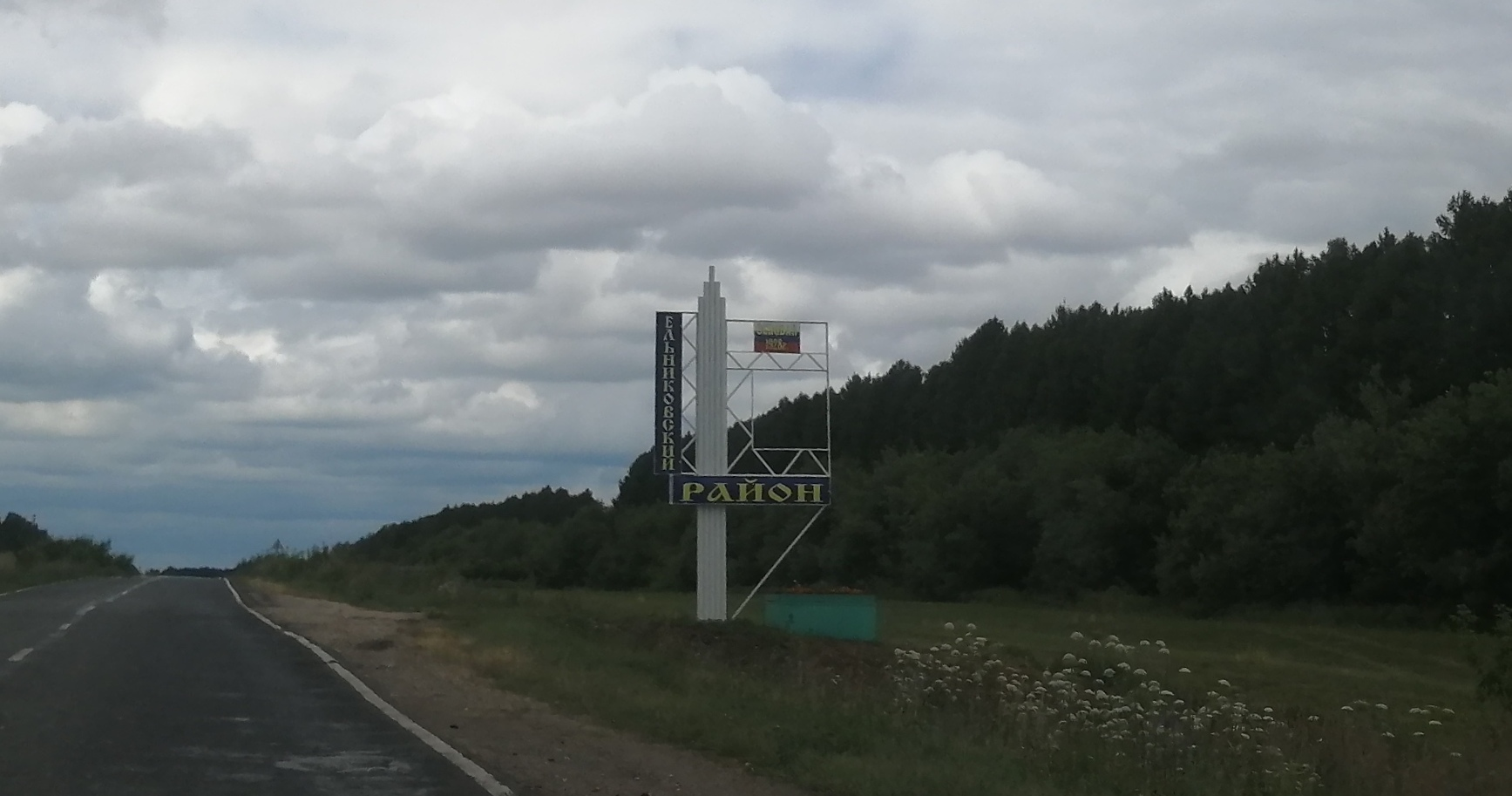
- Etymology: Moksha: Пошаду веле, romanized: Poshadu velä, lit. 'Poshat's village'
- Location within Republic of Mordovia Location within Russia
- Coordinates: 54°39′N 43°42′E
- Country: Russia
- Region: Mordovia
- District: Yelnikovsky District
- Founded: c 15th century
- Founder: Pashat

Government
  - Type: Rural locality Office

Population (2010)
  - Total: 316
- Moksha speakers
- Demonym(s): Moksha: Пошадуфне, romanized: Poshadufnä
- Time zone: UTC+3:00
- Postal code: 431375
- Website: elniki.e-mordovia.ru

Bolshiye Mordovskiye Poshaty (Russian: Больши́е Мордо́вские Пошаты; Moksha: Пошаду веле, romanized: Pošadu vele, Moksha: Сире Мокшень Пошат, romanized: Sire Mokšeń Pošat) is a rural locality (a hamlet), administrative centre of Bolshemordovsko-poshatskoye rural Locality of Yelnikovsky District, Mordovia, Russia.

== Etymology ==
Pre-Christian Moksha name Pashat and velä "village" is for Pashat's village.

== History ==
Mentioned in 1614 among 9 villages of Steldema belyak together with "Anayeva, Shapkina, Podlyasova, Selische, Paramzina, Zheravkina, Kargashina, 1/2 Avdalova".

== Geography ==
Bolshiye Mordovskiye Poshaty is located in 20 km of Yelniki (the district's administrative centre) by road and 85 km of Lashma station.

== Sources ==
- Inzhevatov, Ivan; Nikonov, Vladimir (1987). Топонимический словарь Мордовской АССР [Toponymic Dictionary Of Mordvin Autonomous Republic] (in Russian). Mordovian Book Publishing.
