= Zubu (disambiguation) =

Zubu (Chinese: 朮不姑 or 阻卜 or 阻䪁, also referred to as Dada or Tatars) was the common name of Khamag Mongol, Khereid, Naiman and Tatar tribes from the 10th to 12th centuries.

Zubu may also refer to:

- Zubova Polyana, Republic of Mordovia, Russia
- Zubu, obsolete spelling of Cebu City and province, Philippines
- Zubu, stray cat from Doraemon: Nobita in the Wan-Nyan Spacetime Odyssey
