= Yavas =

Yavas Явас
- Work settlement

Other transcription(s)
  - Moksha: Яваз
- Interactive map of Yavas
- Location of Yavas Yavas (Republic of Mordovia)
- Coordinates: 54°25′N 42°51′E
- Country: Russia
- Federal subject: Mordovia
- Administrative district: Zubovo-Polyansky District
- Work SettlementSelsoviet: Yavas Work Settlement
- Founded: 1931

Population (2010 Census)
  - Total: 7,941
  - Estimate (2025): 5,745 (−27.7%)

Administrative status
  - Capital of: Yavas Work Settlement

Municipal status
  - Municipal district: Zubovo-Polyansky Municipal District
  - Urban settlement: Yavasskoye Urban Settlement
  - Capital of: Yavasskoye Urban Settlement
- Time zone: UTC+3 (MSK)
- Postal code: 431160
- OKTMO ID: 89621180051

Yavas population
- 2010 Census: 7,941
- 2002 Census: 7,964
- 1989 Census: 8,345
- 1979 Census: 4,705

Yavas (Russian: Ява́с; Moksha: Яваз, Javaz) is an urban locality (a work settlement) in the Zubovo-Polyansky District of the Republic of Mordovia, Russia. As of the 2010 Census, its population was 7,941. It is the location of women's corrective colony No. 2, Mordovia and corrective colony No. 11, Mordovia for men.

== History ==
It was founded in 1931 as the headquarters of the fast-paced camp system for prisoners, dubbed Temlag (named after the town of Temnikov) of the Gulag system, later transferred to Dubravlag. The settlement retains its value as one of the centers of the Russian penitentiary system.

The status of urban-type settlement was assigned to the settlement by the decree of the Presidium of the Supreme Council of the Autonomous Republic of Mordovia on April 9, 1959.

Located on Yavas River, 42 kilometres (26 mi) north from the district center Zubova Polyana and 36 kilometres (22 mi) from the railway station Potma. Founded in 1930 on the railway line Potma – Barashevo, it served as an area for harvesting industrial wood and firewood for Moscow. At the beginning of the 1930s, the village became the center of the CTI network opened here ("Dubravlag"). A factory for wood processing was built in 1941–1945. By the mid-1950s, a school, hotel, bath, residential buildings and a stadium were built, and the House of Culture was renovated.

== Administrative and municipal status ==
Within the framework of administrative divisions, the work settlement of Yavas, together with three rural localities, is incorporated within Zubovo-Polyansky District as Yavas Work Settlement (an administrative division of the district). As a municipal division, Yavas Work Settlement is incorporated within Zubovo-Polyansky Municipal District as Yavasskoye Urban Settlement.

== Notable people ==
- Vladimir Dezhurov, cosmonaut, was born here
