= Vladimir Dezhurov =

Russian cosmonaut (born 1962)

- Владимир Дежуров
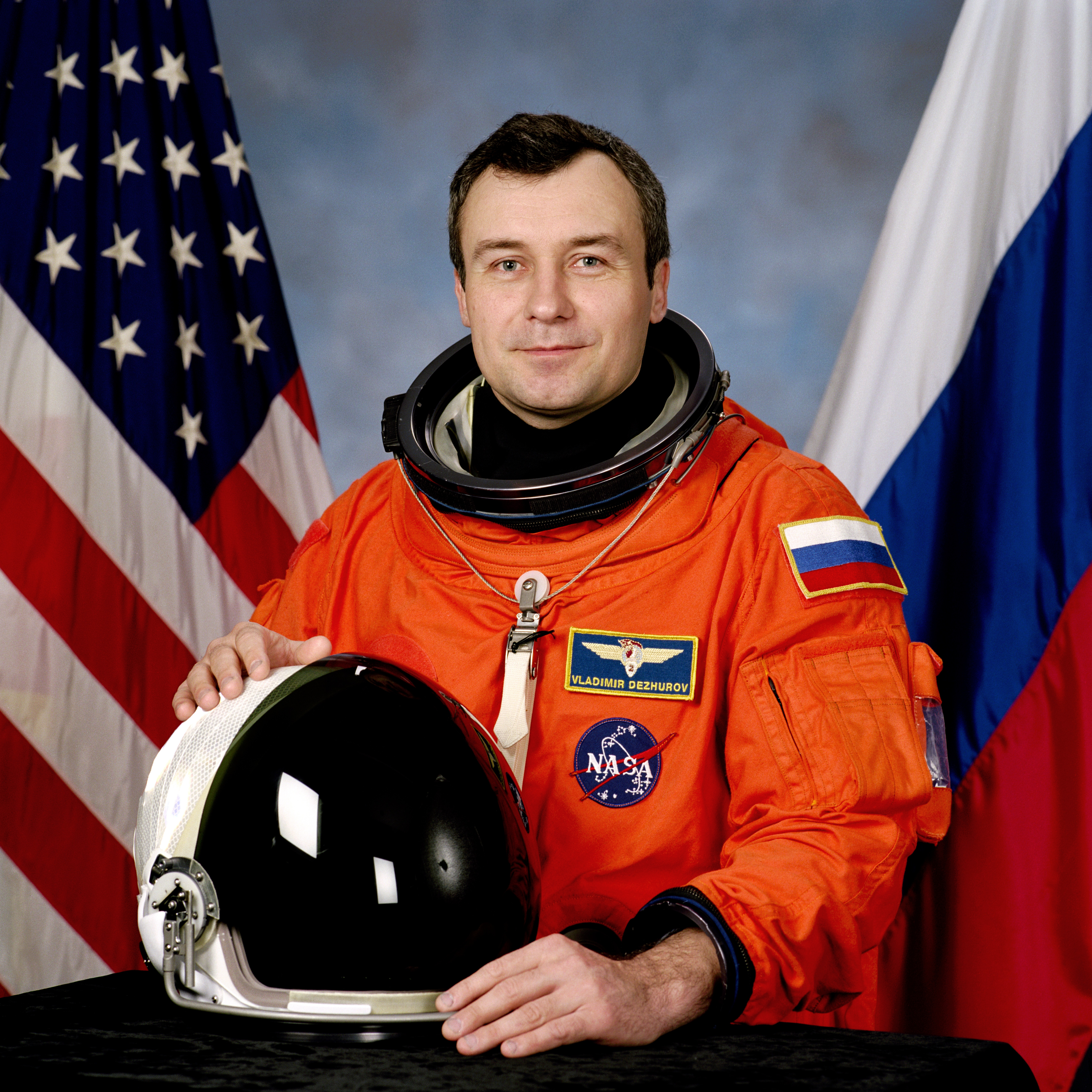
- Born: July 30, 1962 (age 64); Yavas, Mordovia, Soviet Union
- Occupation: Mechanical Engineer
- Awards: Hero of the Russian Federation
- Space career

Roscosmos cosmonaut
- Status: Retired
- Rank: Lieutenant Colonel, Russian Air Force
- Time in space: 244d 05h 28m
- Selection: 1987 Cosmonaut Group
- Total EVAs: 9
- Total EVA time: 37 hours, 02 minutes
- Missions: Soyuz TM-21/STS-71 (Mir EO-18), STS-105/STS-108 (Expedition 3)
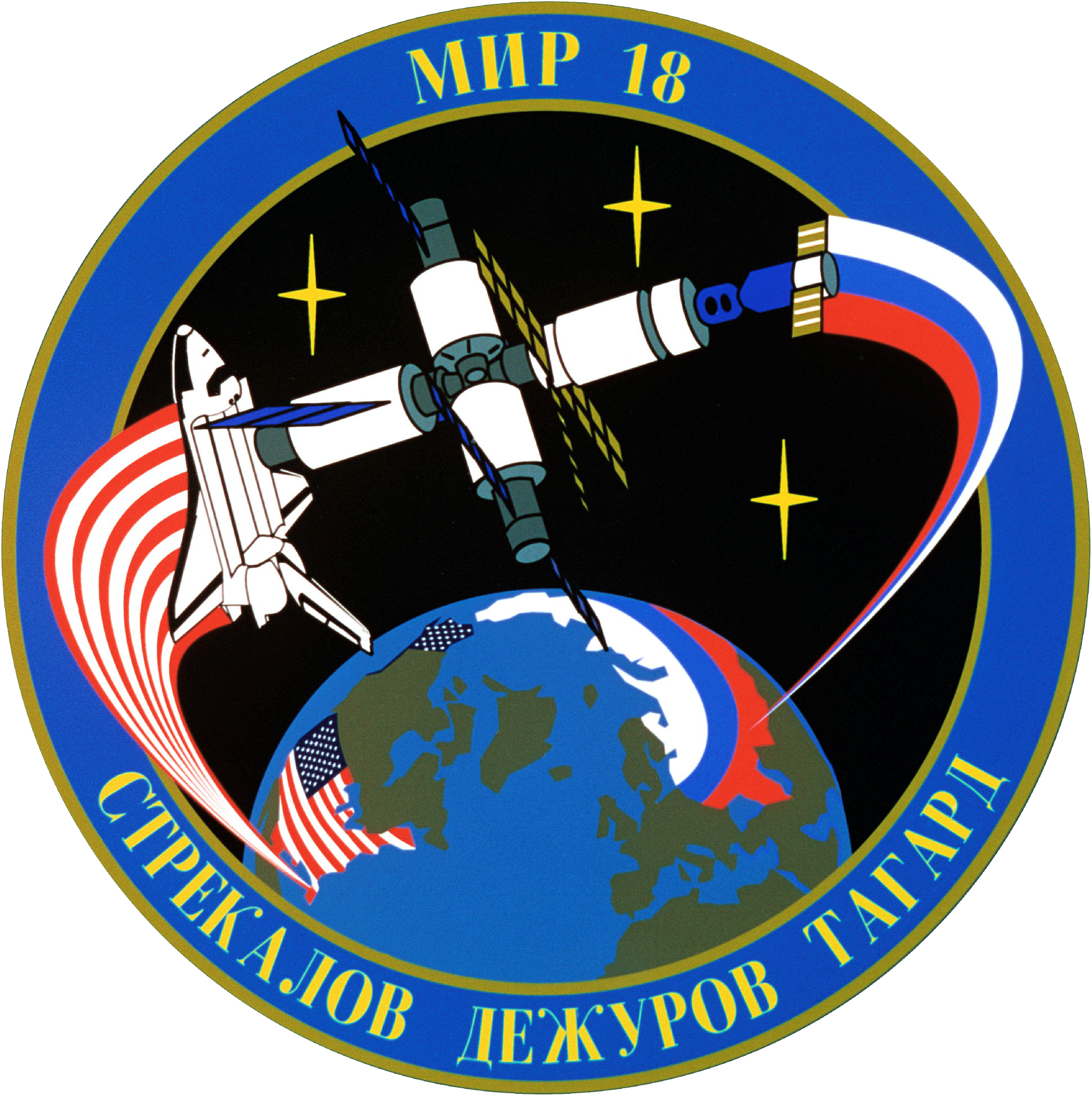
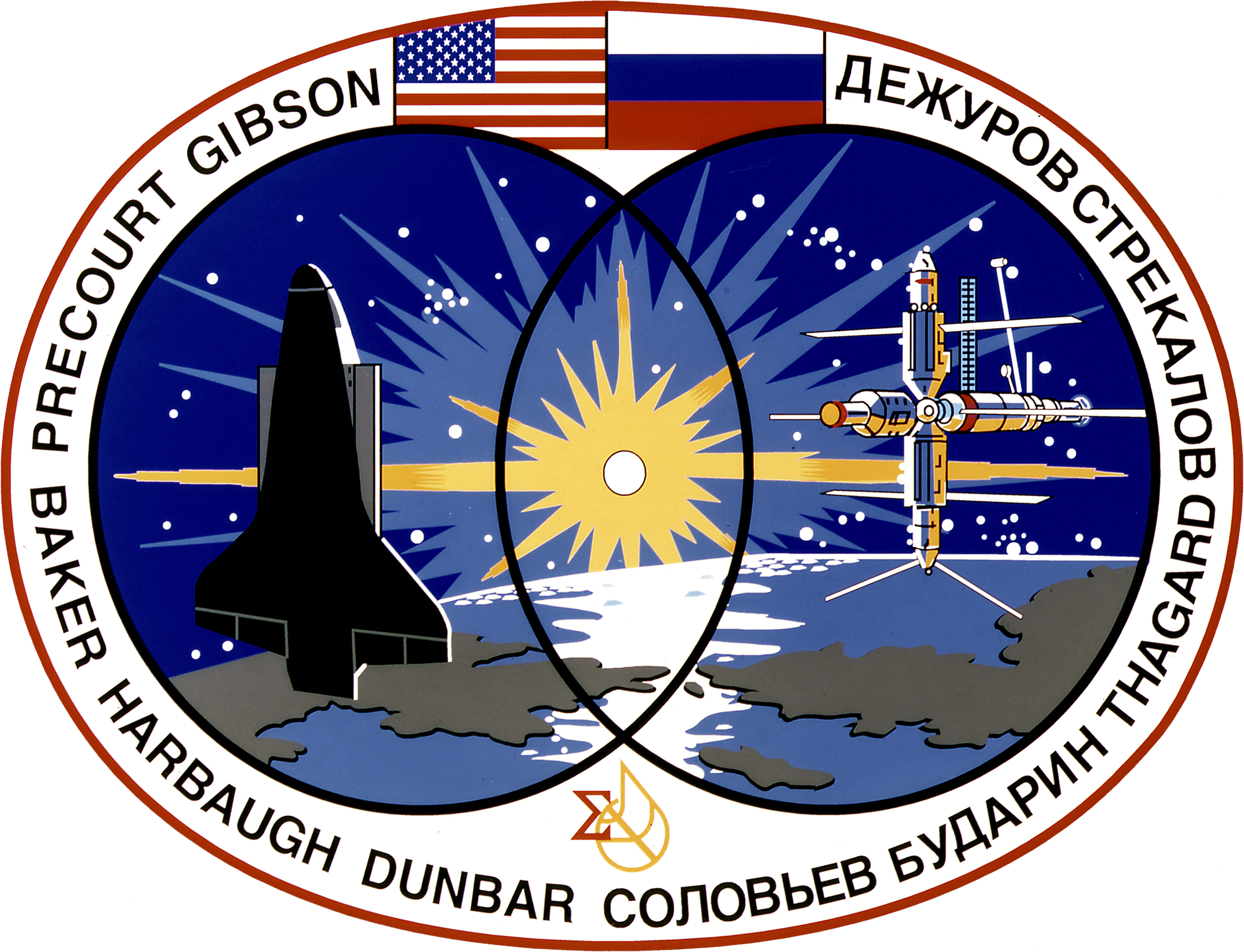
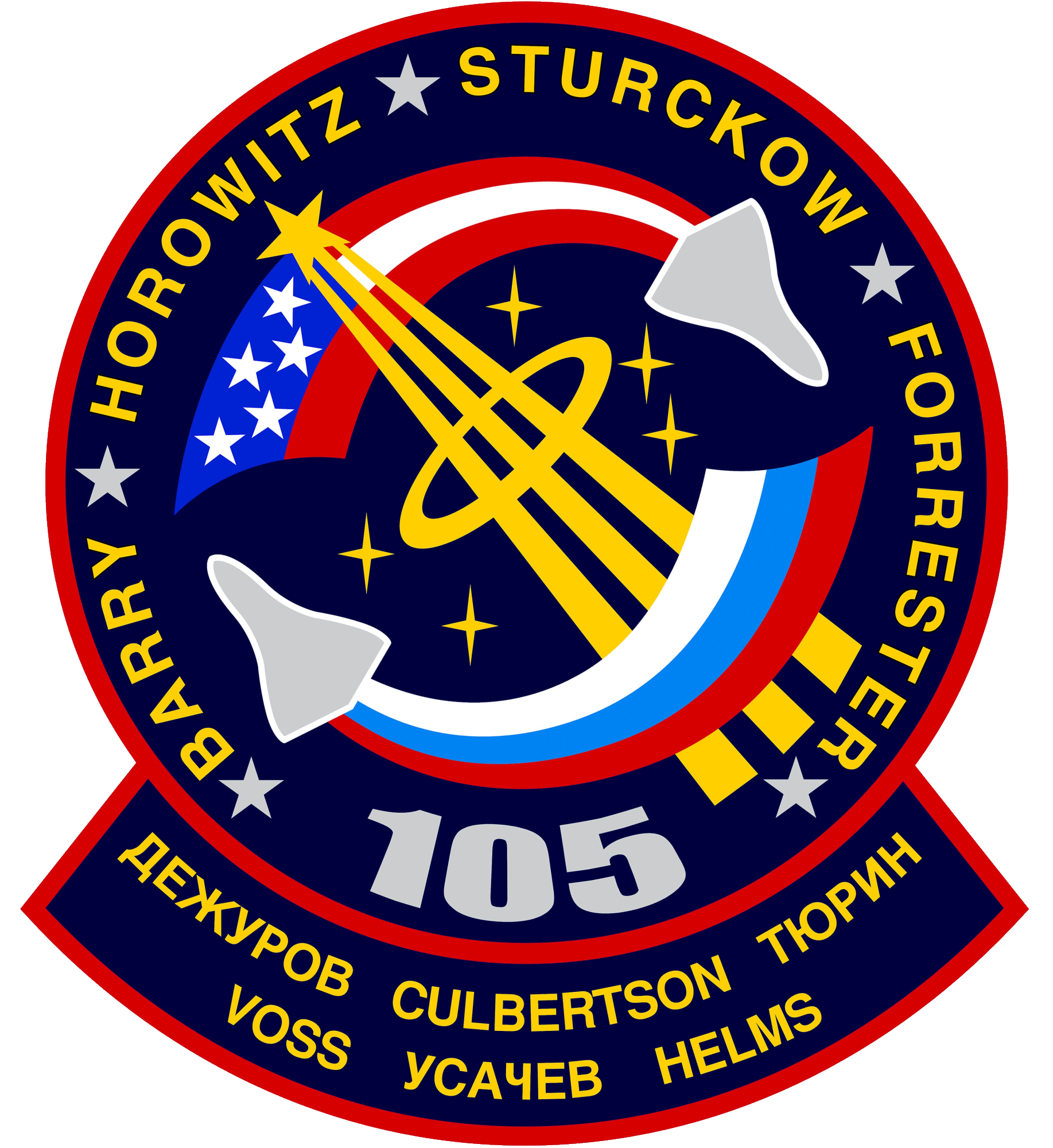
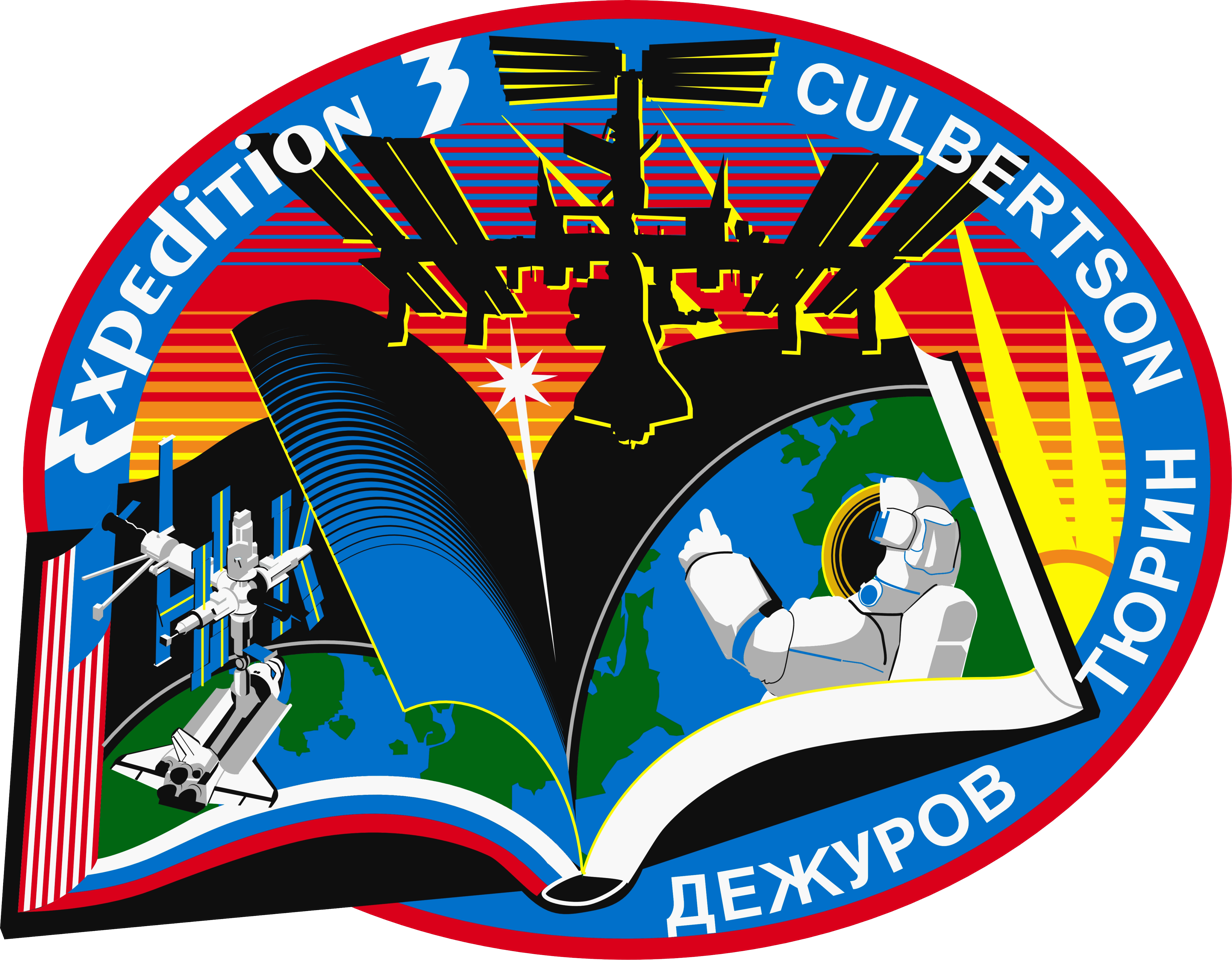
- Mission insignia

Vladimir Nikolayevich Dezhurov (Russian: Влади́мир Никола́евич Дежу́ров; born July 30, 1962) is a Russian former cosmonaut who resides in Star City, Moscow. He is a veteran of two spaceflights, to the Mir and International Space Stations. During his career, Dezhurov also conducted nine spacewalks before his retirement on July 12, 2004.

== Personal ==
Dezhurov was born on July 30, 1962, in the settlement of Yavas, Zubovo-Polyansky District, Mordovia, Russia. He is married to Elena Valentinovna Dezhurova (née Suprina). They have two daughters, Anna, born in 1983, and Svetlana, born in 1987. His father, Nikolai Serafimovich Dezhurov and mother, Anna Vasilevna Dezhurova reside in Yavas settlement, Zubovo-Polyansk district, Mordovia, Russia.

== Education ==
Dezhurov attended and graduated from the S.I. Gritsevits Kharkov Higher Military Aviation School in 1983 with a pilot engineer's diploma.

== Experience ==
After graduating, Dezhurov served as a pilot and senior pilot in the Russian Air Force.

== Awards ==
Dezhurov was awarded the Hero of the Russian Federation medal and the Pilot/Cosmonaut title by Decree of the President of the Russian Federation. He has been also awarded three Air Force medals during his career.

== Cosmonaut career ==
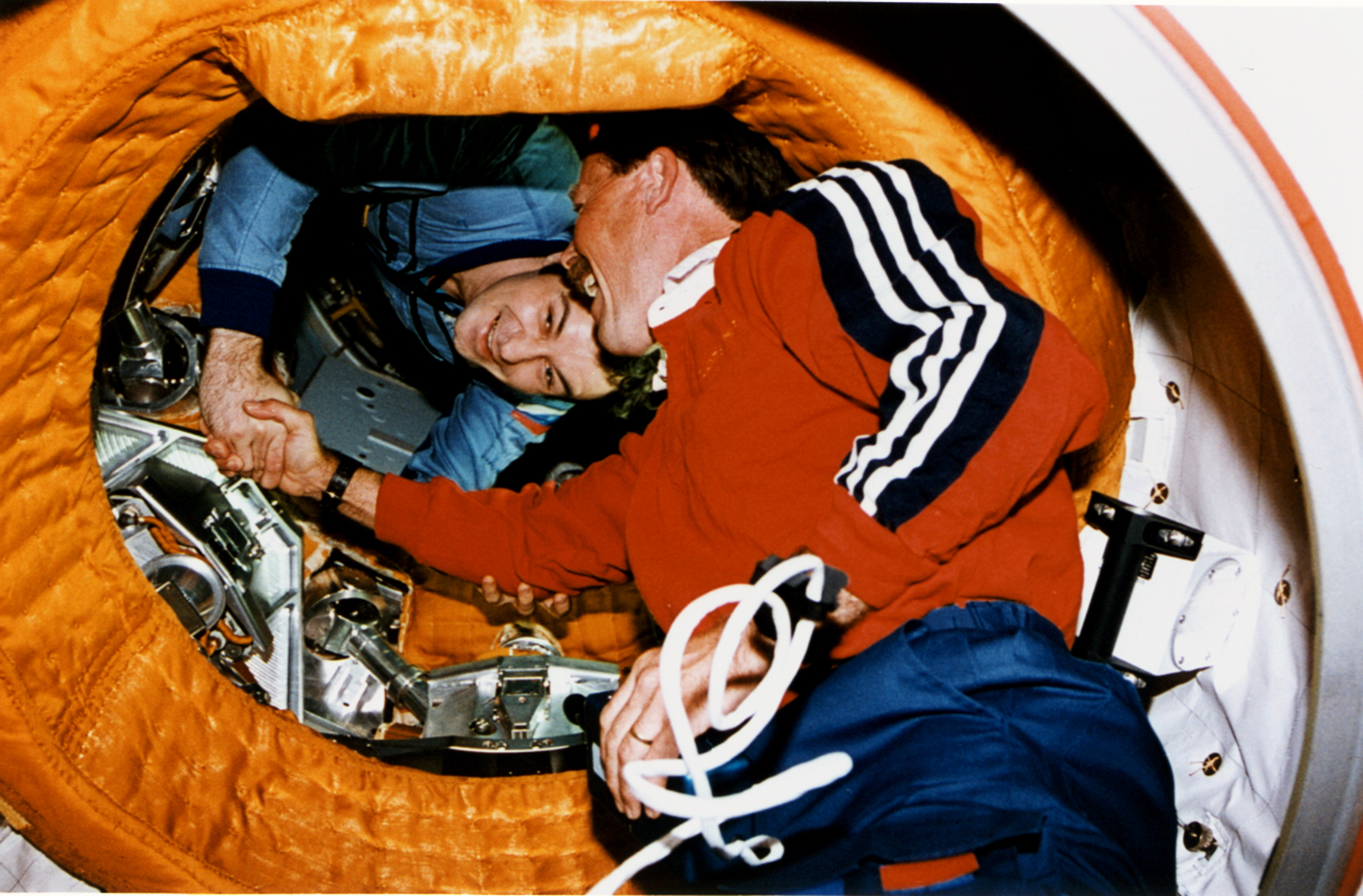
Astronaut Robert Gibson, STS-71 mission commander, shakes the hand of cosmonaut Vladimir Dezhurov.

In 1987, he was assigned to the Cosmonaut Training Center. From December 1987 to June 1989, he underwent a course of general space training. Since September 1989, he has continued training as a member of a group of test cosmonauts. Since 1991, he has been a correspondence student at the Yuri A. Gagarin Air Force Academy.

=== Mir EO-18 ===
In March 1994, Dezhurov began flight training as commander of the prime crew of the Mir-18 mission. The crew was launched from the Baikonur Cosmodrome in Kazakhstan on March 14, 1995, aboard the Soyuz TM-21 spacecraft. Following a two-day solo flight, the Soyuz spacecraft docked with the Mir on March 16. Dezhurov served as the Mir E-18 commander. There were several technical problems during this mission. The crew also performed life science experiments. Following a 115-day flight, the mission concluded with landing at the Kennedy Space Center in Florida, aboard Space Shuttle Atlantis on July 7, 1995.

=== Expedition 3 ===
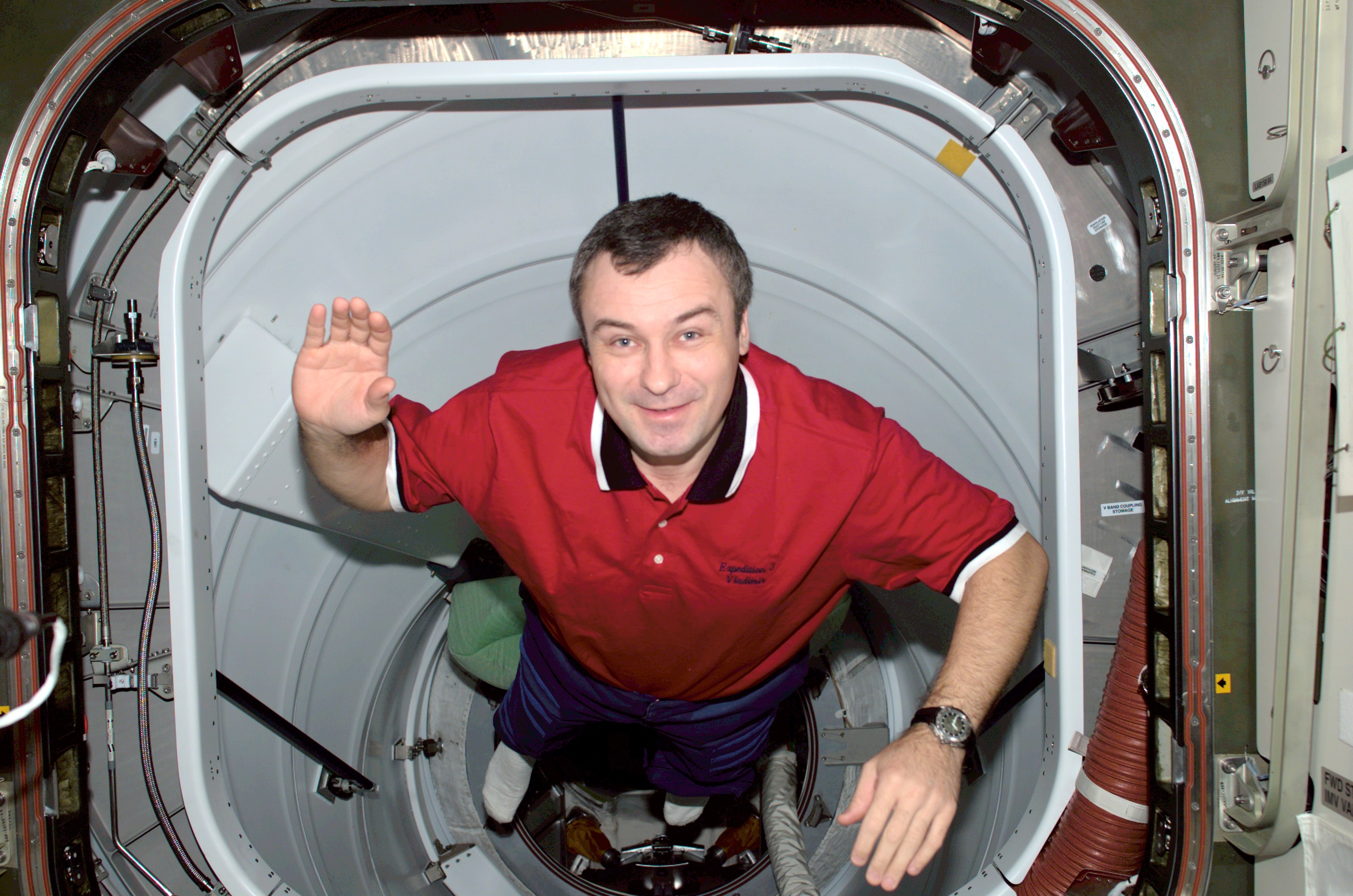
Vladimir Dezhurov, Expedition 3 flight engineer, floats through the Pressurized Mating Adapter 2 (PMA-2) on the ISS.

Dezhurov lived and worked aboard the International Space Station where he served as a member of the Expedition 3 crew. Space Shuttle Discovery carrying Dezhurov and six other crewmembers on STS-105 mission blasted off to space from the Kennedy Space Center (KSC) on August 10, 2001. The shuttle docked with the ISS on 12 August at 18:41 UTC. Dezhurov spent approximately 4 months aboard the station as a flight engineer. During the long-duration mission the Expedition 3 crew enjoyed a unique view of the 2001 Leonid meteor storm. At the end of the stay Expedition 3 crewmembers, Dezhurov, NASA astronaut Frank Culbertson and cosmonaut Mikhail Tyurin returned to Earth on board Space Shuttle Endeavour. Endeavour's STS-108 mission delivered the Expedition 4 crew to the ISS and landed at KSC on December 17, 2001.

=== Spacewalks ===
During his cosmonaut career, Dezhurov has performed nine spacewalks. During Mir EO-18 long-duration mission Dezhurov together with cosmonaut Gennady Strekalov conducted five spacewalks. As of June 2010, his nine spacewalks totalling 37 hours and 2 minutes has placed him in the 25th position in the list of astronauts who have the most extra-vehicular activity (EVA) time.

On 12 May 1995, Dezhurov conducted his first career spacewalk. The spacewalk started 04:20:44 UTC and ended at 10:35:16 UTC. He and Strekalov prepared for the arrival of the Spektr module and prepared to move Kristall's solar panel. They also practiced work at the Kristall module. The spacewalk lasted 6 hours and 14 minutes.

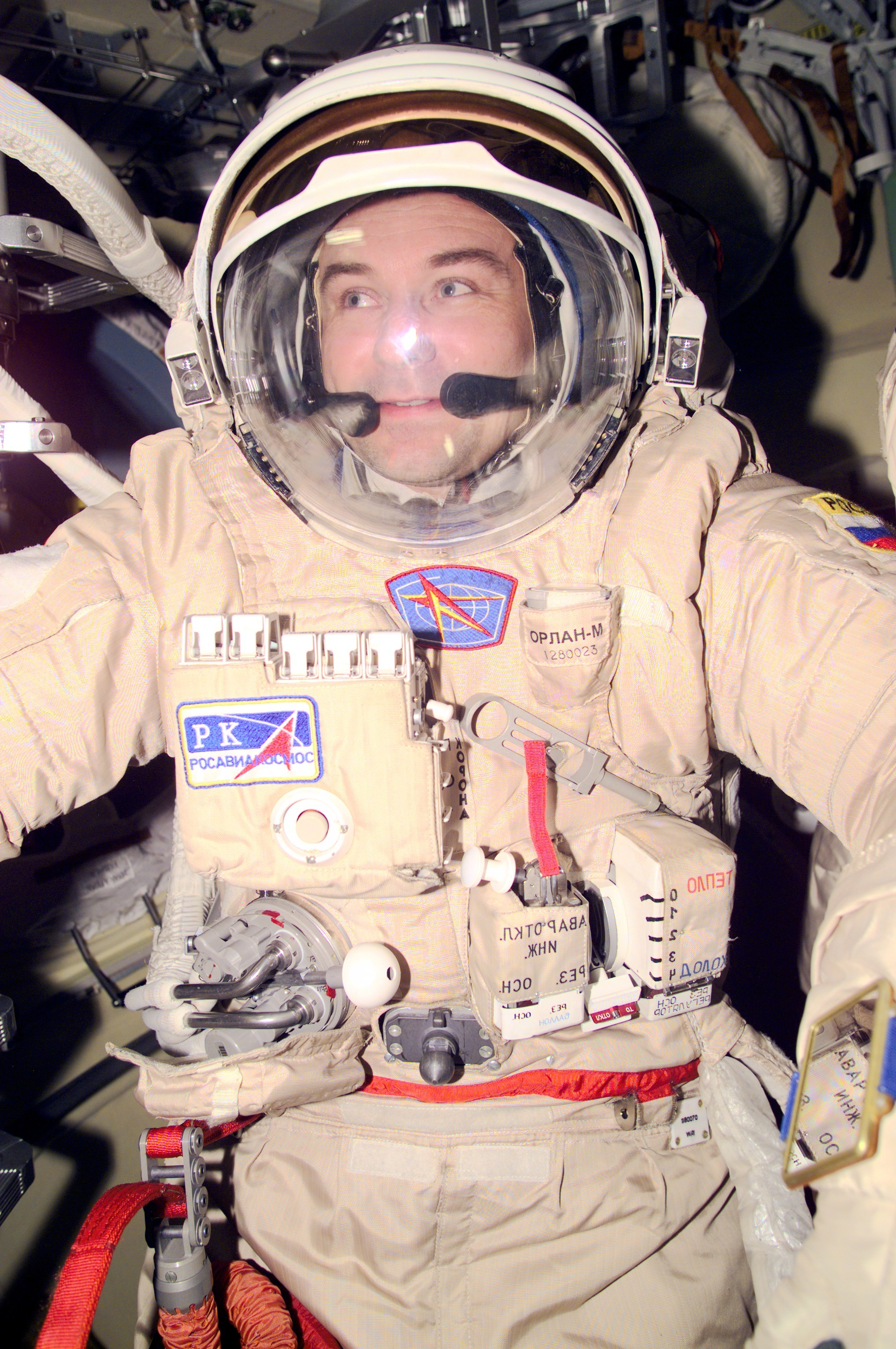
Dezhurov wears the Russian Orlan space suit as he prepared for an upcoming spacewalk from the Pirs airlock on the ISS.

Dezhurov performed his second career spacewalk on May 17. They moved the solar array to the Kvant-1 module. The spacewalk lasted six hours and 52 minutes.

On May 22, Dezhurov and Strekalov installed the solar array on Kvant-1 and stowed Kristall's another solar array. The excursion out of the Mir Space Station marked Dezhurov's third career spacewalk. The spacewalk started at 00:10:20 UTC and was completed at 05:25:11 UTC. The spacewalk lasted 5 hours and 14 minutes.

On 28 May and June 1, 1995, Dezhurov and Strekolov conducted two spacewalks to prepare Mir to move Kristall and Spektr modules. Dezhurov's fourth and fifth career spacewalks lasted 21 and 23 minutes respectively.

Dezhurov conducted another four spacewalks during the Expedition 3 mission to the ISS. On October 8, 2001, Dezhurov and Tyurin ventured outside the ISS to mark the 100th spacewalk to be carried out by Russian cosmonauts. The main objective of the spacewalk was to outfit the Pirs Docking Compartment and make connections between that newly arrived compartment and the Zvezda module. The spacewalkers installed a cable that allows space walk radio communications between the two station sections. They also installed handrails on the new compartment and an exterior ladder that will be used to help spacewalkers leave Pirs' hatch. Dezhurov and Tyurin also installed a Strela cargo crane onto the station. The spacewalk lasted 4 hours and 58 minutes ending at 19:21 UTC.

On October 15, 2001, Dezhurov performed his seventh career spacewalk. The two spacewalkers returned to space outside the ISS from the Pirs airlock. Dezhurov and Tyurin installed Russian commercial experiments on the exterior of Pirs. Among the experiments is a set of investigations of how various materials react to the space environment over a long time. Called MPAC-SEEDS, the investigation is housed in three briefcase-sized containers. The spacewalk lasted 5 hours and 52 minutes.

On November 12, 2001, Dezhurov conducted his eighth career spacewalk. Dezhurov and NASA astronaut Culbertson connected cables on the exterior of the Pirs Docking Compartment for the Kurs automated docking system. They completed checks of the Strela cargo crane, using one space walker at the end of the crane's boom to simulate a cargo. They also inspected and photographed a small panel of one solar array on the Zvezda Service Module that has one portion of a panel not fully unfolded. The spacewalk was conducted in Russian Orlan spacesuits. It lasted 5 hours and 4 minutes.

On December 3, 2001, Dezhurov conducted his ninth career spacewalk. Dressed in Orlan spacesuits, Tyurin and Dezhurov floated out of the Pirs airlock at 13:20 UTC. Dezhurov and Tyurin used a cutting tool to remove an errant rubber seal that had prevented a Progress resupply ship from firmly docking with the ISS. The two spacewalkers also took pictures of the debris, which was a rubberized seal from the previous cargo ship, and of the docking interface. The spacewalk lasted 2 hours and 46 minutes.

== See also ==
- List of Heroes of the Russian Federation
