= Bolshoye Ignatovo =

Rural locality in Mordovia, Russia

Coordinates: 55°00′59″N 45°34′24″E

Bolshoye Ignatovo Erzya: Игнадвеле Russian: Большое Игнатово
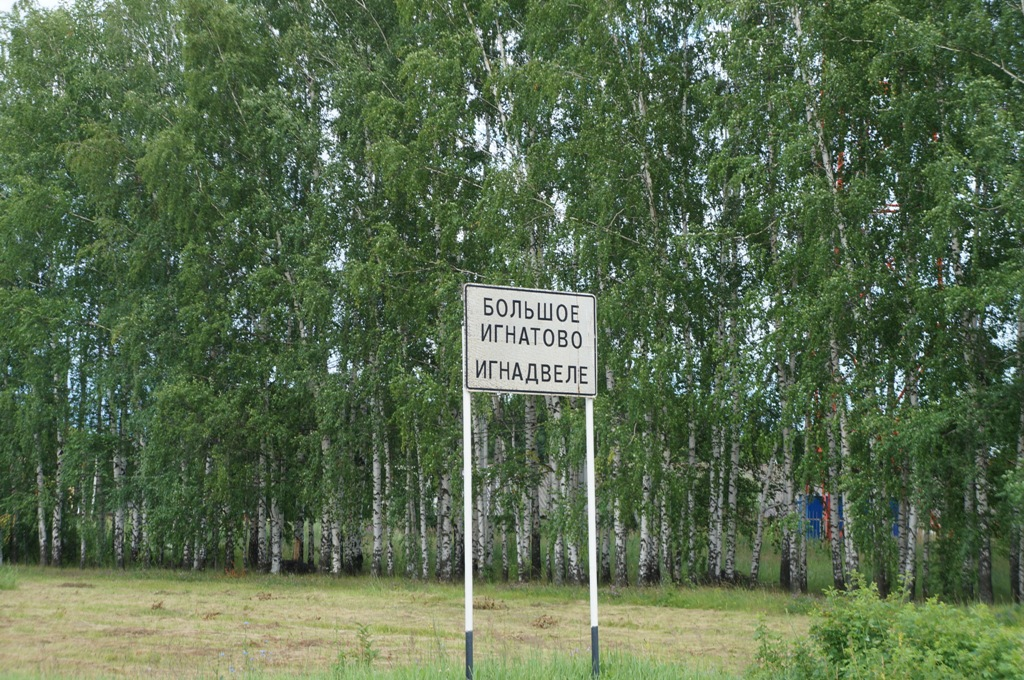
- Interactive map of Bolshoye Ignatovo
- Country: Russia
- Republic: Mordovia
- District: Bolsheignatovsky District

Bolshoye Ignatovo (Russian: Большо́е Игна́тово, Erzya: Игнадвеле, Ignadvele) is a rural locality (a selo) and the administrative center of Bolsheignatovsky District of the Republic of Mordovia, Russia. Population: 2,842 (2010 census); 2,799 (2002 census); 2,451 (1989 Soviet census).
