= Atyuryevo =

Atyuryevo Атюрьево
- Selo
- Interactive map of Atyuryevo
- Location of Atyuryevo Atyuryevo (Republic of Mordovia)
- Coordinates: 54°19′03″N 43°20′02″E
- Country: Russia
- Federal subject: Mordovia
- Administrative district: Atyuryevsky District
- SettlementSelsoviet: Atyuryevskoye Settlement

Population (2010 Census)
  - Total: 4,429
  - Estimate (2021): 3,920 (−11.5%)

Administrative status
  - Capital of: Atyuryevsky District, Atyuryevskoye Settlement

Municipal status
  - Municipal district: Atyuryevsky Municipal District
  - Rural settlement: Atyuryevskoye Rural Settlement
  - Capital of: Atyuryevsky Municipal District, Atyuryevskoye Rural Settlement
- Time zone: UTC+3 (MSK)
- Postal code: 431050
- OKTMO ID: 89605410101

Atyuryevo (Russian: Атю́рьево, Moksha: Атерь, Ateŕ) is a rural locality (a selo) and the administrative center of Atyuryevsky District of the Republic of Mordovia, Russia. Population: 4,429 (2010 census); 4,736 (2002 census); 4,990 (1989 Soviet census).
