= Yelnikovsky District =

Yelnikovsky District Ельниковский район (Russian)
- District

Other transcription(s)
  - Moksha: Ельниконь район
  - Erzya: Кузбуе
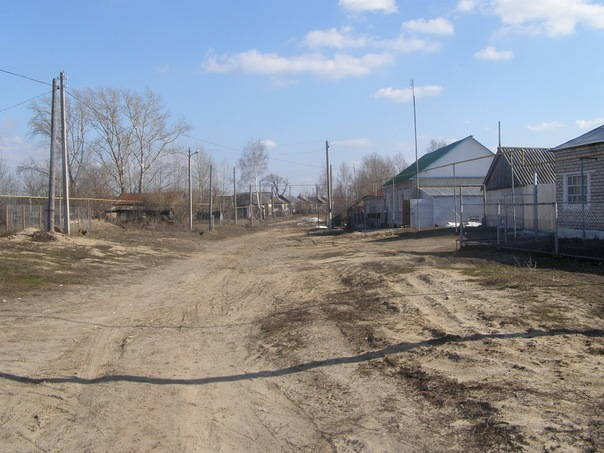
- Village in Yelnikovsky District
- Location of Yelnikovsky District in the Republic of Mordovia
- Coordinates: 54°37′N 43°52′E
- Country: Russia
- Federal subject: Republic of Mordovia
- Established: 16 July 1928
- Administrative center: Yelniki

Area
  - Total: 1,056 km^{2} (408 sq mi)

Population (2010 Census)
  - Total: 11,995
  - Density: 11.36/km^{2} (29.42/sq mi)
  - Urban: 0%
  - Rural: 100%

Administrative structure
  - Administrative divisions: 13 Selsoviets
  - Inhabited localities: 67 rural localities

Municipal structure
  - Municipally incorporated as: Yelnikovsky Municipal District
  - Municipal divisions: 0 urban settlements, 13 rural settlements
- Time zone: UTC+3 (MSK)
- OKTMO ID: 89618000
- Website: http://elniki.e-mordovia.ru

Population of Yelnikovsky District
- 2010 Census: 11,995
- 2002 Census: 13,359
- 1989 Census: 15,842
- 1979 Census: 18,033

Yelnikovsky District (Russian: Е́льниковский райо́н; Moksha: Ельниконь аймак, Jeĺnikoń ajmak; Erzya: Кузбуе, Kuzbuje) is an administrative and municipal district (raion), one of the twenty-two in the Republic of Mordovia, Russia. It is located in the north of the republic. The area of the district is 1,056 square kilometers (408 sq mi). Its administrative center is the rural locality (a selo) of Yelniki. As of the 2010 Census, the total population of the district was 11,995, with the population of Yelniki accounting for 49.2% of that number.

== Administrative and municipal status ==
Within the framework of administrative divisions, Yelnikovsky District is one of the twenty-two in the republic. The district is divided into thirteen selsoviets which comprise sixty-seven rural localities. As a municipal division, the district is incorporated as Yelnikovsky Municipal District. Its sixteen selsoviets are incorporated into sixteen rural settlements within the municipal district. The selo of Yelniki serves as the administrative center of both the administrative and municipal district.
