= Pushkino, Altai Krai =

Pushkino Пушкино
- Settlement
- Location within Altai Krai Location within Russia
- Coordinates: 51°31′N 81°07′E
- Country: Russia
- Region: Altai Krai
- District: Rubtsovsky District
- Time zone: UTC+7:00

Pushkino (Russian: Пушкино) is a rural locality (a settlement) in Rubtsovsky Selsoviet, Rubtsovsky District, Altai Krai, Russia. The population was 343 as of 2013. There are 3 streets.

== Geography ==
Pushkino is located 10 km west of Rubtsovsk (the district's administrative centre) by road. Sad-gorod is the nearest rural locality.
