= Atyashevo, Republic of Bashkortostan =

Atyashevo Атяшево
- Selo
- Location within Bashkortostan Location within Russia
- Coordinates: 53°02′N 55°15′E
- Country: Russia
- Region: Bashkortostan
- District: Fyodorovsky District
- Time zone: UTC+5:00

Atyashevo (Russian: Атяшево; Bashkir: Әтәс, Ätäs) is a rural locality (a selo) in Balyklinsky Selsoviet, Fyodorovsky District, Bashkortostan, Russia. The population was 290 as of 2010. There are 8 streets.

== Geography ==
Atyashevo is located 23 km southeast of Fyodorovka (the district's administrative centre) by road. Veselovka and Balykly are the nearest rural localities.
