= Umet, Volgograd Oblast =

Umet Умёт
- Selo
- Location within Volgograd Oblast Location within Russia
- Coordinates: 50°17′N 45°20′E
- Country: Russia
- Region: Volgograd Oblast
- District: Kamyshinsky District
- Time zone: UTC+4:00

Umet (Russian: Умёт) is a rural locality (a selo) and the administrative center of Umyotovskoye Rural Settlement, Kamyshinsky District, Volgograd Oblast, Russia. The population was 1,248 as of 2010. There are 18 streets.

== Geography ==
Umet is located in forest steppe, on the Volga Upland, on the Ilovlya River, 29 km north of Kamyshin (the district's administrative centre) by road. Veselovo is the nearest rural locality.
