= Lukhovka =

Lukhovka Луховка
- Work settlement
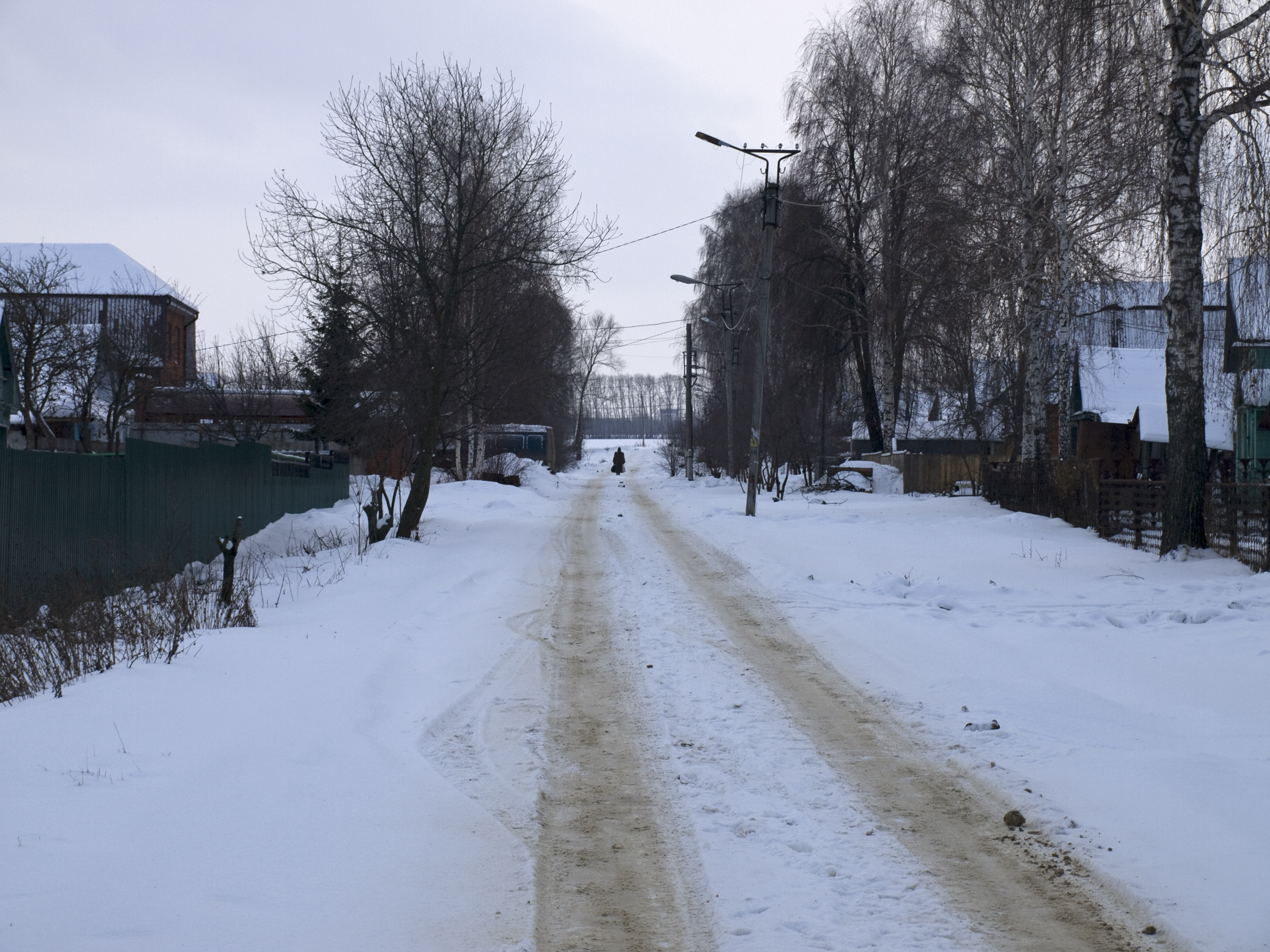
- Kolkhoznaya Street in Lukhovka
- Interactive map of Lukhovka
- Location of Lukhovka Lukhovka (Republic of Mordovia)
- Coordinates: 54°09′N 45°15′E
- Country: Russia
- Federal subject: Mordovia
- Administrative district: Oktyabrsky City District
- Work SettlementSelsoviet: Lukhovka Work Settlement
- Urban-type settlement status since: 1969

Population (2010 Census)
  - Total: 8,639
  - Estimate (2021): 9,036 (+4.6%)

Administrative status
  - Subordinated to: city of republic significance of Saransk
  - Capital of: Lukhovka Work Settlement

Municipal status
  - Urban okrug: Saransk Urban Okrug
- Time zone: UTC+3 (MSK)
- Postal code: 430910
- OKTMO ID: 89701000056

Lukhovka population
- 2010 Census: 8,639
- 2002 Census: 9,099
- 1989 Census: 10,017
- 1979 Census: 7,543

Lukhovka (Russian: Лу́ховка) is an urban locality (a work settlement) under the administrative jurisdiction of Oktyabrsky City District of the city of republic significance of Saransk in the Republic of Mordovia, Russia. As of the 2010 Census, its population was 8,639.

== History ==
Urban-type settlement status was granted to it in 1969.

== Administrative and municipal status ==
Within the framework of administrative divisions, the work settlement of Lukhovka, together with two rural localities, is incorporated as Lukhovka Work Settlement, which is subordinated to Oktyabrsky City District of the city of republic significance of Saransk. Within the framework of municipal divisions, Lukhovka is a part of Saransk Urban Okrug.
