= Yalga, Republic of Mordovia =

Yalga Ялга
- Work settlement
- Interactive map of Yalga
- Location of Yalga Yalga (Republic of Mordovia)
- Coordinates: 54°08′N 45°08′E
- Country: Russia
- Federal subject: Mordovia
- Administrative district: Oktyabrsky City District
- Work SettlementSelsoviet: Yalga Work Settlement
- Urban-type settlement status since: 1984

Population (2010 Census)
  - Total: 5,672
  - Estimate (2021): 6,442 (+13.6%)

Administrative status
  - Subordinated to: city of republic significance of Saransk
  - Capital of: Yalga Work Settlement

Municipal status
  - Urban okrug: Saransk Urban Okrug
- Time zone: UTC+3 (MSK)
- Postal code: 430904
- OKTMO ID: 89701000066

Yalga population
- 2010 Census: 5,672
- 2002 Census: 5,088
- 1989 Census: 3,766

Yalga (Russian: Ялга́) is an urban locality (a work settlement) under the administrative jurisdiction of Oktyabrsky City District of the city of republic significance of Saransk in the Republic of Mordovia, Russia. As of the 2010 Census, its population was 5,672.

== History ==
Urban-type settlement status was granted to it in 1984.

== Administrative and municipal status ==
Within the framework of administrative divisions, the work settlement of Yalga is incorporated as Yalga Work Settlement, which is subordinated to Oktyabrsky City District of the city of republic significance of Saransk. Within the framework of municipal divisions, Yalga is a part of Saransk Urban Okrug.
