= Atyuryevsky District =

Atyuryevsky District Атюрьевский район (Russian)
- District

Other transcription(s)
  - Moksha: Атерень аймак
  - Erzya: Атюрьбуе
- Location of Atyuryevsky District in the Republic of Mordovia
- Coordinates: 54°19′N 43°21′E
- Country: Russia
- Federal subject: Republic of Mordovia
- Established: 10 May 1937
- Administrative center: Atyuryevo

Area
  - Total: 826.1 km^{2} (319.0 sq mi)

Population (2010 Census)
  - Total: 10,952
  - Density: 13.26/km^{2} (34.34/sq mi)
  - Urban: 0%
  - Rural: 100%

Administrative structure
  - Administrative divisions: 11 Selsoviets
  - Inhabited localities: 50 rural localities

Municipal structure
  - Municipally incorporated as: Atyuryevsky Municipal District
  - Municipal divisions: 0 urban settlements, 11 rural settlements
- Time zone: UTC+3 (MSK)
- OKTMO ID: 89605000
- Website: https://aturevo-rm.ru/

Population of Atyuryevsky District
- 2010 Census: 10,952
- 2002 Census: 12,151
- 1989 Census: 15,112
- 1979 Census: 18,857

Atyuryevsky District (Russian: Атю́рьевский райо́н; Moksha: Атерень аймак, Atereń ajmak; Erzya: Атюрьбуе, Atüŕbuje) is an administrative and municipal district (raion), one of the twenty-two in the Republic of Mordovia, Russia. It is located in the west of the republic. The area of the district is 826.1 square kilometers (319.0 sq mi). Its administrative center is the rural locality (a selo) of Atyuryevo. As of the 2010 Census, the total population of the district was 10,952, with the population of Atyuryevo accounting for 40.4% of that number.

== Administrative and municipal status ==
Within the framework of administrative divisions, Atyuryevsky District is one of the twenty-two in the republic. The district is divided into eleven selsoviets which comprise fifty rural localities. As a municipal division, the district is incorporated as Atyuryevsky Municipal District. Its eleven selsoviets are incorporated into eleven rural settlements within the municipal district. The selo of Atyuryevo serves as the administrative center of both the administrative and municipal district.

== Notable residents ==
- Vladimir Kanaykin (born 1985), race walker
- Olena Shumkina (born 1988), Ukrainian race walker
