= Bolsheignatovsky District =

Bolsheignatovsky District Большеигнатовский район (Russian)
- District

Other transcription(s)
  - Erzya: Покш Игнадбуе
  - Moksha: Оцю Игнатовань аймак
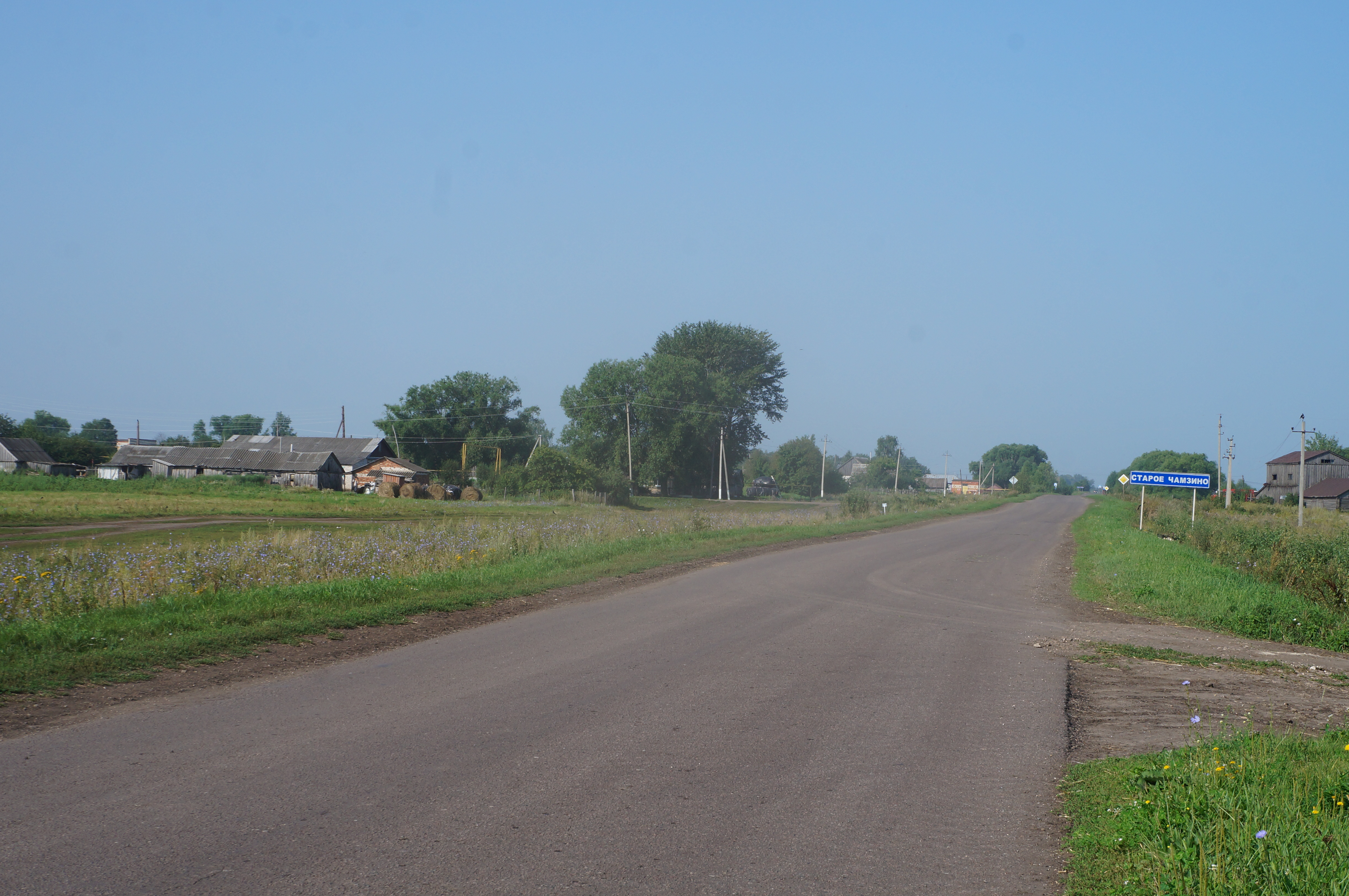
- Village Staroye Chamzino, Bolsheignatovsky District
- Location of Bolsheignatovsky District in the Republic of Mordovia
- Coordinates: 55°01′N 45°35′E
- Country: Russia
- Federal subject: Republic of Mordovia
- Established: 10 January 1930
- Administrative center: Bolshoye Ignatovo

Area
  - Total: 834.2 km^{2} (322.1 sq mi)

Population (2010 Census)
  - Total: 8,313
  - Density: 9.965/km^{2} (25.81/sq mi)
  - Urban: 0%
  - Rural: 100%

Administrative structure
  - Administrative divisions: 12 Selsoviets
  - Inhabited localities: 37 rural localities

Municipal structure
  - Municipally incorporated as: Bolsheignatovsky Municipal District
  - Municipal divisions: 0 urban settlements, 12 rural settlements
- Time zone: UTC+3 (MSK)
- OKTMO ID: 89613000
- Website: http://bignatovo.e-mordovia.ru

Population of Bolsheignatovsky District
- 2010 Census: 8,313
- 2002 Census: 9,483
- 1989 Census: 10,615
- 1979 Census: 11,959

Bolsheignatovsky District (Russian: Большеигна́товский райо́н; Erzya: Покш Игнадбуе, Pokš Ignadbuje; Moksha: Оцю Игнатовань аймак, Otsü Ignatovań ajmak) is an administrative and municipal district (raion), one of the twenty-two in the Republic of Mordovia, Russia. It is located in the northeast of the republic. The area of the district is 834.2 square kilometers (322.1 sq mi). Its administrative center is the rural locality (a selo) of Bolshoye Ignatovo. As of the 2010 Census, the total population of the district was 8,313, with the population of Bolshoye Ignatovo accounting for 34.2% of that number.

== Administrative and municipal status ==
Within the framework of administrative divisions, Bolsheignatovsky District is one of the twenty-two in the republic. The district is divided into twelve selsoviets which comprise thirty-seven rural localities. As a municipal division, the district is incorporated as Bolsheignatovsky Municipal District. Its twelve selsoviets are incorporated into twelve rural settlements within the municipal district. The selo of Bolshoye Ignatovo serves as the administrative center of both the administrative and municipal district.
