= Nikolayevka, Saransk, Republic of Mordovia =

Nikolayevka Николаевка
- Work settlement
- Interactive map of Nikolayevka
- Location of Nikolayevka Nikolayevka (Republic of Mordovia)
- Coordinates: 54°09′N 45°08′E
- Country: Russia
- Federal subject: Mordovia
- Administrative district: Oktyabrsky City District
- Work SettlementSelsoviet: Nikolayevka Work Settlement
- Founded: 1860s
- Urban-type settlement status since: 1969

Population (2010 Census)
  - Total: 5,058
  - Estimate (2021): 3,725 (−26.4%)

Administrative status
  - Subordinated to: city of republic significance of Saransk
  - Capital of: Nikolayevka Work Settlement

Municipal status
  - Urban okrug: Saransk Urban Okrug
- Time zone: UTC+3 (MSK)
- Postal code: 430903
- OKTMO ID: 89701000061

Nikolayevka population
- 2010 Census: 5,058
- 2002 Census: 5,199
- 1989 Census: 5,662
- 1979 Census: 5,449

Nikolayevka (Russian: Никола́евка; Russian pronunciation: [nʲɪkɵlʲaevkə]) is an urban locality (a work settlement) under the administrative jurisdiction of Oktyabrsky City District of the city of republic significance of Saransk in the Republic of Mordovia, Russia. As of the 2010 Census, its population was 5,058.

== History ==
It was founded in the 1860s; urban-type settlement status was granted to it in 1969.

== Administrative and municipal status ==
Within the framework of administrative divisions, the work settlement of Nikolayevka, together with two rural localities, is incorporated as Nikolayevka Work Settlement, which is subordinated to Oktyabrsky City District of the city of republic significance of Saransk. Within the framework of municipal divisions, Nikolayevka is a part of Saransk Urban Okrug.
