= Umyot, Tambov Oblast =

Umyot Умёт
- Urban-type settlement
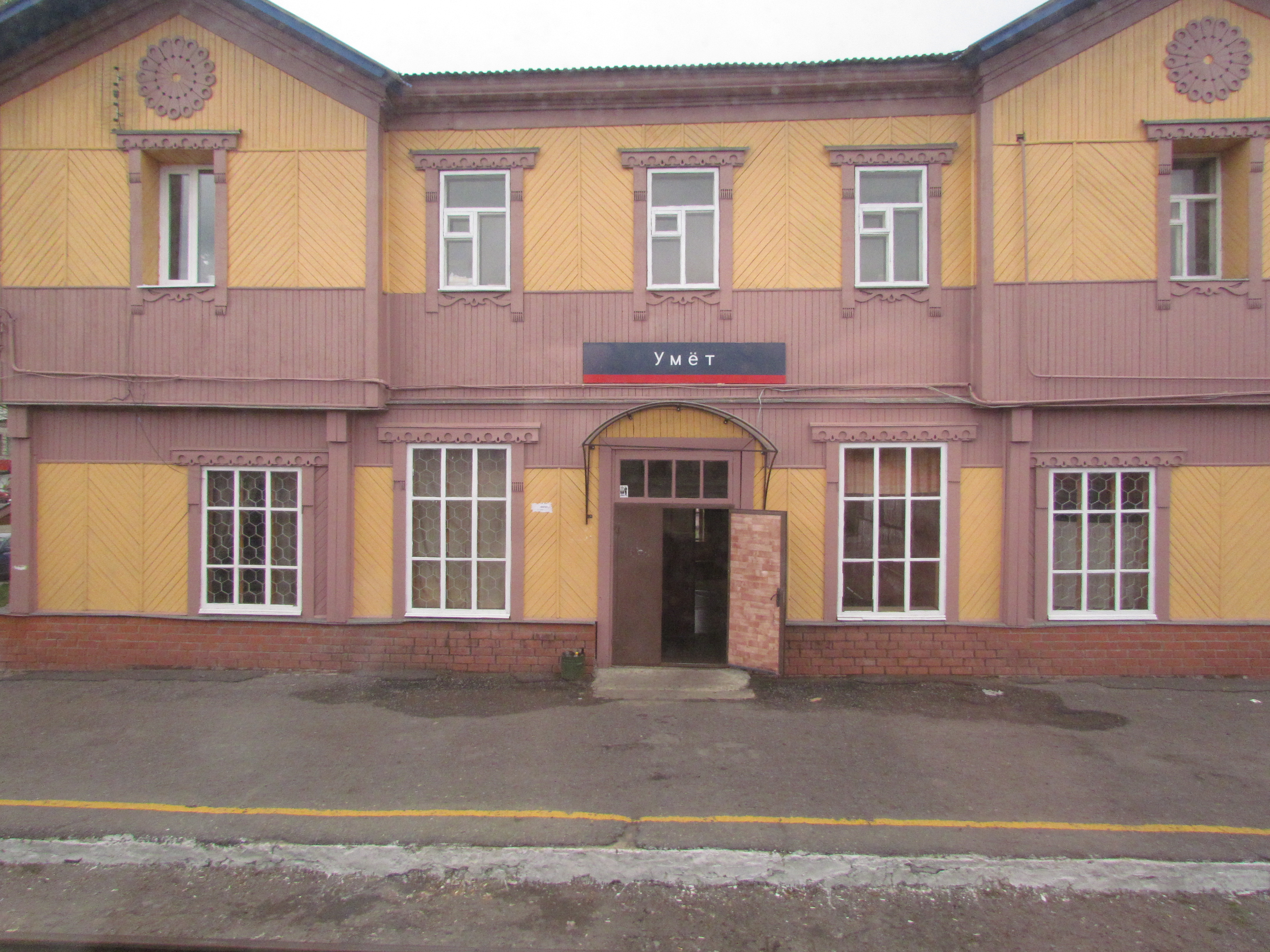
- Umyot railway station
- Interactive map of Umyot
- Location of Umyot Umyot (Tambov Oblast)
- Coordinates: 52°34′N 42°59′E
- Country: Russia
- Federal subject: Tambov Oblast
- Administrative district: Umyotsky District
- Elevation: 174 m (571 ft)

Population (2010 Census)
  - Total: 4,740
  - Estimate (2021): 4,243 (−10.5%)
- Time zone: UTC+3 (MSK)
- Postal code: 393130
- OKTMO ID: 68646151051

Umyot (Russian: Умёт) is an urban locality (a work settlement) and the administrative center of Umyotsky District of Tambov Oblast, Russia, located in the upper streams of the Vyazhlya River (Don's basin), 112 kilometers (70 mi) east of Tambov. Population: 4,740 (2010 census); 5,000 (2002 census); 5,276 (1989 Soviet census).

It was first mentioned in 1710. Urban-type settlement status was granted to it in 1968.
