= Kadoshkino =

Kadoshkino Кадошкино
- Work settlement

Other transcription(s)
  - Moksha: Кадаж
- Interactive map of Kadoshkino
- Location of Kadoshkino Kadoshkino (Republic of Mordovia)
- Coordinates: 54°01′N 44°26′E
- Country: Russia
- Federal subject: Mordovia
- Administrative district: Kadoshkinsky District
- Work SettlementSelsoviet: Kadoshkino Work Settlement
- Founded: 1893
- Urban-type settlement status since: 1968

Population (2010 Census)
  - Total: 4,704
  - Estimate (2025): 3,758 (−20.1%)

Administrative status
  - Capital of: Kadoshkinsky District, Kadoshkino Work Settlement

Municipal status
  - Municipal district: Kadoshkinsky Municipal District
  - Urban settlement: Kadoshkinskoye Urban Settlement
  - Capital of: Kadoshkinsky Municipal District, Kadoshkinskoye Urban Settlement
- Time zone: UTC+3 (MSK)
- Postal code: 431900
- OKTMO ID: 89628151051

Kadoshkino population
- 2010 Census: 4,704
- 2002 Census: 4,874
- 1989 Census: 5,141
- 1979 Census: 4,909

Kadoshkino (Russian: Кадо́шкино; Moksha: Кадаж, Kadaž) is an urban locality (a work settlement) and the administrative center of Kadoshkinsky District of the Republic of Mordovia, Russia. As of the 2010 Census, its population was 4,704.

== History ==
Urban-type settlement status was granted to it in 1968.

== Administrative and municipal status ==
Within the framework of administrative divisions, Kadoshkino serves as the administrative center of Kadoshkinsky District. As an administrative division, the work settlement of Kadoshkino, together with five rural localities, is incorporated within Kadoshkinsky District as Kadoshkino Work Settlement. As a municipal division, Kadoshkino Work Settlement is incorporated within Kadoshkinsky Municipal District as Kadoshkinskoye Urban Settlement.
