= Kadoshkinsky District =

Kadoshkinsky District Кадошкинский район (Russian)
- District

Other transcription(s)
  - Moksha: Кадажень аймак
  - Erzya: Кадоньбуе
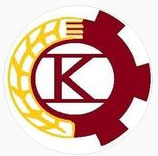
- Coat of arms
- Location of Kadoshkinsky District in the Republic of Mordovia
- Coordinates: 54°02′N 44°24′E
- Country: Russia
- Federal subject: Republic of Mordovia
- Established: May 27, 1991
- Administrative center: Kadoshkino

Area
  - Total: 618.6 km^{2} (238.8 sq mi)

Population (2010 Census)
  - Total: 7,970
  - Density: 12.9/km^{2} (33.4/sq mi)
  - Urban: 59.0%
  - Rural: 41.0%

Administrative structure
  - Administrative divisions: 1 Work settlements, 6 Selsoviets
  - Inhabited localities: 1 urban-type settlements, 20 rural localities

Municipal structure
  - Municipally incorporated as: Kadoshkinsky Municipal District
  - Municipal divisions: 1 urban settlements, 6 rural settlements
- Time zone: UTC+3 (MSK)
- OKTMO ID: 89628000
- Website: http://kadoshkino.e-mordovia.ru

Population of Kadoshkinsky District
- 2010 Census: 7,970
- 2002 Census: 9,484

Kadoshkinsky District (Russian: Кадо́шкинский райо́н; Moksha: Кадажень аймак, Kadažeń ajmak; Erzya: Кадоньбуе, Kadońbuje) is an administrative and municipal district (raion), one of the twenty-two in the Republic of Mordovia, Russia. It is located in the center of the republic. The area of the district is 618.6 square kilometers (238.8 sq mi). Its administrative center is the urban locality (a work settlement) of Kadoshkino. As of the 2010 Census, the total population of the district was 7,970, with the population of Kadoshkino accounting for 59.0% of that number.

== History ==
The Kadoshkinsky District was officially established on May 27, 1991, marking its revival after a period of administrative reorganization. Historically, the district's formation dates back to 1935, when it was first established. However, it was abolished in 1963 during Soviet administrative restructuring. The district's re-establishment in 1991 reflected efforts to restore local governance and regional identity.

== Administrative and municipal status ==
Within the framework of administrative divisions, Kadoshkinsky District is one of the twenty-two in the republic. It is divided into one work settlement (an administrative division with the administrative center in the work settlement (inhabited locality) of Kadoshkino), and six selsoviets, all of which comprise twenty rural localities. As a municipal division, the district is incorporated as Kadoshkinsky Municipal District. Kadoshkino Work Settlement is incorporated into an urban settlement, and the six selsoviets are incorporated into six rural settlements within the municipal district. The work settlement of Kadoshkino serves as the administrative center of both the administrative and municipal district.

== Notable residents ==
- Ivan Boldin (1892 in Vysokaya – 1965), senior Red Army general
- Pavel Bulanov (1895–1938), NKVD officer
