= Yelniki, Republic of Mordovia =

Elniki Ельники
- Village
- Interactive map of Elniki
- Coordinates: 54°37′5″N 43°51′54″E
- Country: Russia

Yelniki (Russian: Е́льники; Moksha: Ельник, Jeĺnik) is a village located in the Republic of Mordovia, Russia. It serves as the administrative center of Yelnikovsky District.

== Geography ==
Yelniki is located close to the river Malaya Varma, 32 km from the city of Krasnoslobodsk, 132 km from the city of Saransk and 84 km from the railroad junction.

== History ==
In the notes of F. Obreskov (1591–1592) it is written that Yelniki was founded at the end of the 16th century. The name of the village has its origin in the word yelniki which means 'spruce forest'. A spruce forest was previously located close to the village. Currently there is no forest, just grasslands.

== Population ==
- 1959: 3253
- 1970: 3609
- 1979: 4020
- 1989: 5457
- 2002: 5678
- 2010: 5905

== Transport ==
This village is a road junction of local significance. The roads to Krasnoslobodsk, Temnikov and Pervomaisk are located here.
