= Atyashevsky District =

Atyashevsky District Атяшевский район (Russian)
- District

Other transcription(s)
  - Erzya: Отяжбуе
  - Moksha: Атяшевань аймак
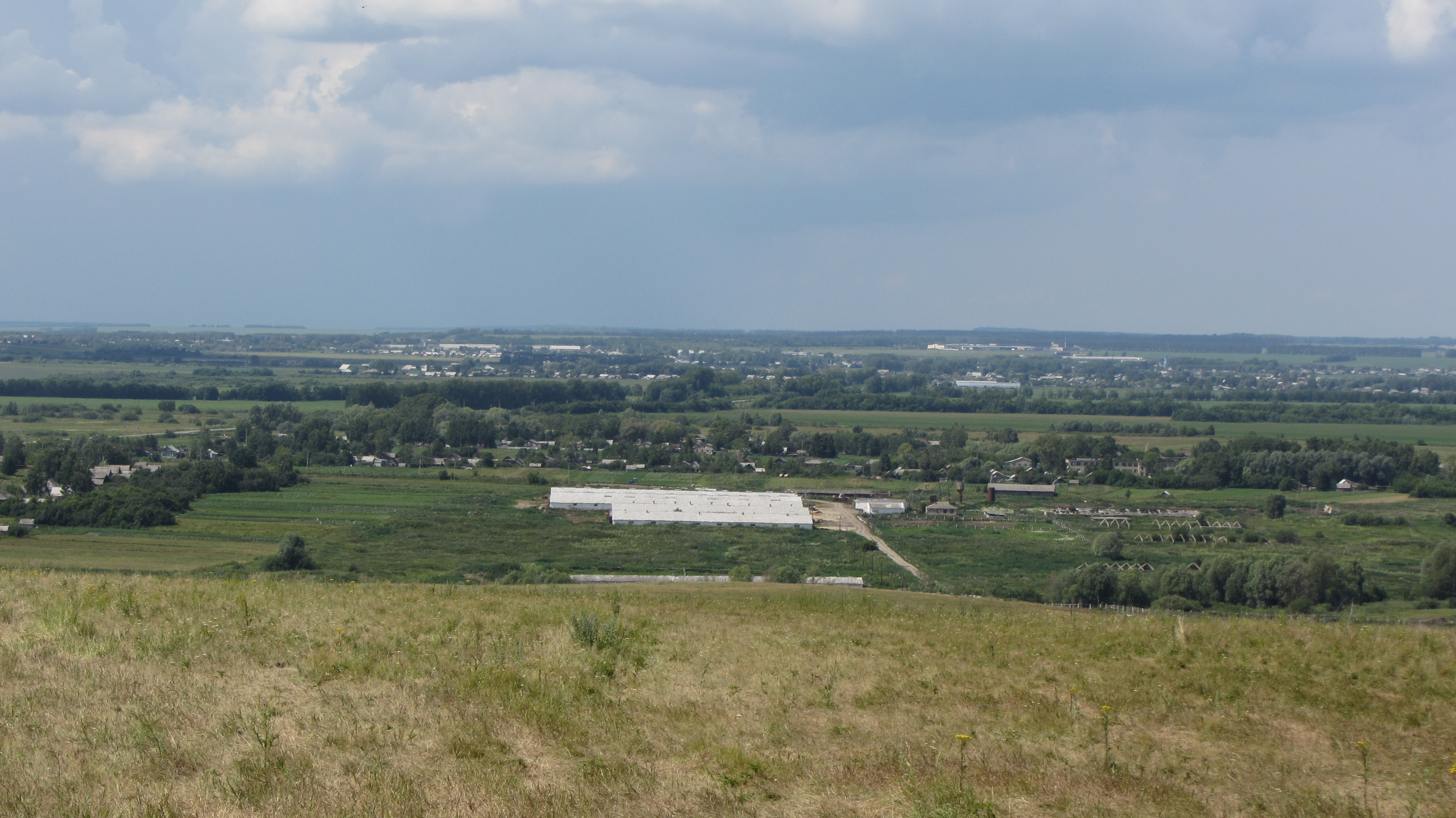
- Landscape of Atyashevsky District
- Location of Atyashevsky District in the Republic of Mordovia
- Coordinates: 54°35′N 46°06′E
- Country: Russia
- Federal subject: Republic of Mordovia
- Established: 16 July 1928
- Administrative center: Atyashevo

Area
  - Total: 1,095.8 km^{2} (423.1 sq mi)

Population (2010 Census)
  - Total: 20,161
  - Density: 18.398/km^{2} (47.652/sq mi)
  - Urban: 31.0%
  - Rural: 69.0%

Administrative structure
  - Administrative divisions: 1 Work settlements, 18 Selsoviets
  - Inhabited localities: 1 urban-type settlements, 57 rural localities

Municipal structure
  - Municipally incorporated as: Atyashevsky Municipal District
  - Municipal divisions: 1 urban settlements, 18 rural settlements
- Time zone: UTC+3 (MSK)
- OKTMO ID: 89607000
- Website: http://www.atyashevorm.ru

Population of Atyashevsky District
- 2010 Census: 20,161
- 2002 Census: 22,889
- 1989 Census: 27,220
- 1979 Census: 32,741

Atyashevsky District (Russian: Атя́шевский райо́н; Erzya: Отяжбуе, Otäžbuje; Moksha: Атяшевань аймак, Atäševań ajmak) is an administrative and municipal district (raion), one of the twenty-two in the Republic of Mordovia, Russia. It is located in the east of the republic. The area of the district is 1,095.8 square kilometers (423.1 sq mi). Its administrative center is the urban locality (a work settlement) of Atyashevo. As of the 2010 Census, the total population of the district was 20,161, with the population of Atyashevo accounting for 31.0% of that number.

== Administrative and municipal status ==
Within the framework of administrative divisions, Atyashevsky District is one of the twenty-two in the republic. It is divided into one work settlement (an administrative division with the administrative center in the work settlement (inhabited locality) of Atyashevo), and eighteen selsoviets, all of which comprise fifty-seven rural localities. As a municipal division, the district is incorporated as Atyashevsky Municipal District. Atyashevo Work Settlement is incorporated into an urban settlement, and the eighteen selsoviets are incorporated into eighteen rural settlements within the municipal district. The work settlement of Atyashevo serves as the administrative center of both the administrative and municipal district.
