= Umyot, Republic of Mordovia =

Umyot Умёт
- Work settlement
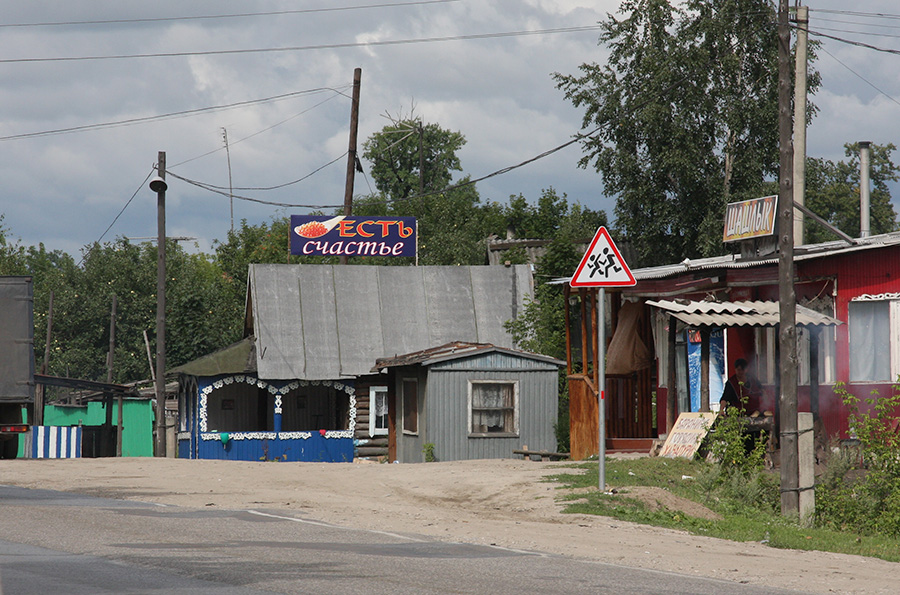
- Interactive map of Umyot
- Location of Umyot Umyot (Republic of Mordovia)
- Coordinates: 54°07′N 42°42′E
- Country: Russia
- Federal subject: Mordovia
- Administrative district: Zubovo-Polyansky District
- Work SettlementSelsoviet: Umyot Work Settlement

Population (2010 Census)
  - Total: 2,822
  - Estimate (2025): 2,338 (−17.2%)

Administrative status
  - Capital of: Umyot Work Settlement

Municipal status
  - Municipal district: Zubovo-Polyansky Municipal District
  - Urban settlement: Umyotskoye Urban Settlement
  - Capital of: Umyotskoye Urban Settlement
- Time zone: UTC+3 (MSK)
- Postal code: 431105
- Dialing code: +7 83458
- OKTMO ID: 89621168051

Umyot population
- 2010 Census: 2,822
- 2002 Census: 3,005
- 1989 Census: 3,383
- 1979 Census: 3,569

Umyot (Russian: Умёт) is an urban locality (a work settlement) in Zubovo-Polyansky District of the Republic of Mordovia, Russia. As of the 2010 Census, its population was 2,822.

== Administrative and municipal status ==
Within the framework of administrative divisions, the work settlement of Umyot, together with two rural localities, is incorporated within Zubovo-Polyansky District as Umyot Work Settlement (an administrative division of the district). As a municipal division, Umyot Work Settlement is incorporated within Zubovo-Polyansky Municipal District as Umyotskoye Urban Settlement.
