= Potma, Zubovo-Polyansky District, Republic of Mordovia =

Potma Потьма
- Work settlement
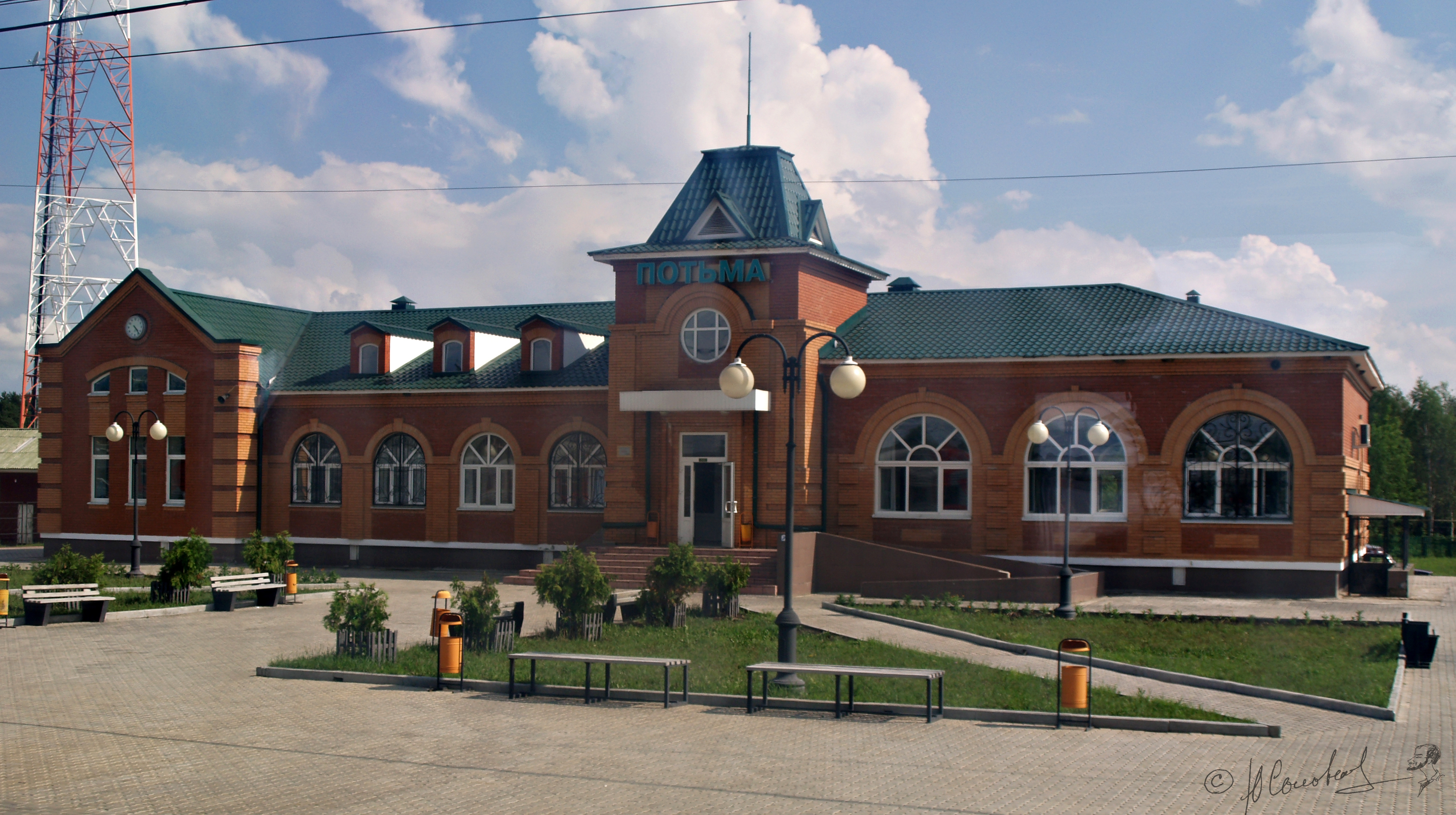
- Potma station
- Interactive map of Potma
- Location of Potma Potma (Republic of Mordovia)
- Coordinates: 54°07′N 42°55′E
- Country: Russia
- Federal subject: Mordovia
- Administrative district: Zubovo-Polyansky District
- Work SettlementSelsoviet: Potma Work Settlement
- Founded: 1913
- Urban-type settlement status since: 1968

Population (2010 Census)
  - Total: 4,171
  - Estimate (2025): 3,585 (−14%)

Administrative status
  - Capital of: Potma Work Settlement

Municipal status
  - Municipal district: Zubovo-Polyansky Municipal District
  - Urban settlement: Potminskoye Urban Settlement
  - Capital of: Potminskoye Urban Settlement
- Time zone: UTC+3 (MSK)
- Postal code: 431100
- Dialing code: +7 83458
- OKTMO ID: 89621163051

Potma population
- 2010 Census: 4,171
- 2002 Census: 4,396
- 1989 Census: 3,636
- 1979 Census: 3,931

Potma (Russian: По́тьма; Moksha: Потма) is an urban locality (a work settlement) in Zubovo-Polyansky District of the Republic of Mordovia, Russia. As of the 2010 Census, its population was 4,171.

== Administrative and municipal status ==
Within the framework of administrative divisions, the work settlement of Potma, together with one rural locality (the settlement of Pruzhanskoye lesnichestvo), is incorporated within Zubovo-Polyansky District as Potma Work Settlement (an administrative division of the district). As a municipal division, Potma Work Settlement is incorporated within Zubovo-Polyansky Municipal District as Potminskoye Urban Settlement.
