= Atyashevo, Atyashevsky District, Republic of Mordovia =

Atyashevo Атяшево
- Work settlement

Other transcription(s)
  - Erzya: Отяжеле
- Interactive map of Atyashevo
- Location of Atyashevo Atyashevo (Republic of Mordovia)
- Coordinates: 54°36′N 46°05′E
- Country: Russia
- Federal subject: Mordovia
- Administrative district: Atyashevsky District
- Work SettlementSelsoviet: Atyashevo Work Settlement
- Founded: 1894
- Urban-type settlement status since: 1963
- Elevation: 215 m (705 ft)

Population (2010 Census)
  - Total: 6,246
  - Estimate (2025): 5,866 (−6.1%)

Administrative status
  - Capital of: Atyashevsky District, Atyashevo Work Settlement

Municipal status
  - Municipal district: Atyashevsky Municipal District
  - Urban settlement: Atyashevskoye Urban Settlement
  - Capital of: Atyashevsky Municipal District, Atyashevskoye Urban Settlement
- Time zone: UTC+3 (MSK)
- Postal codes: 431800, 431849
- OKTMO ID: 89607151051

Atyashevo population
- 2010 Census: 6,246
- 2002 Census: 6,073
- 1989 Census: 6,298
- 1979 Census: 4,393

Atyashevo (Russian: Атя́шево; Erzya: Отяжеле, Otäžele) is an urban locality (a work settlement) and the administrative center of Atyashevsky District of the Republic of Mordovia, Russia. As of the 2010 Census, its population was 6,246.

== History ==
It was founded in 1894; urban-type settlement status was granted to it in 1963.

== Administrative and municipal status ==
Within the framework of administrative divisions, Atyashevo serves as the administrative center of Atyashevsky District. As an administrative division, the work settlement of Atyashevo is incorporated within Atyashevsky District as Atyashevo Work Settlement. As a municipal division, Atyashevo Work Settlement is incorporated within Atyashevsky Municipal District as Atyashevskoye Urban Settlement.
