= Zubovo-Polyansky District =

Zubovo-Polyansky District Зубово-Полянский район (Russian)
- District

Other transcription(s)
  - Moksha: Зубунь район
  - Erzya: Пейкужо буе
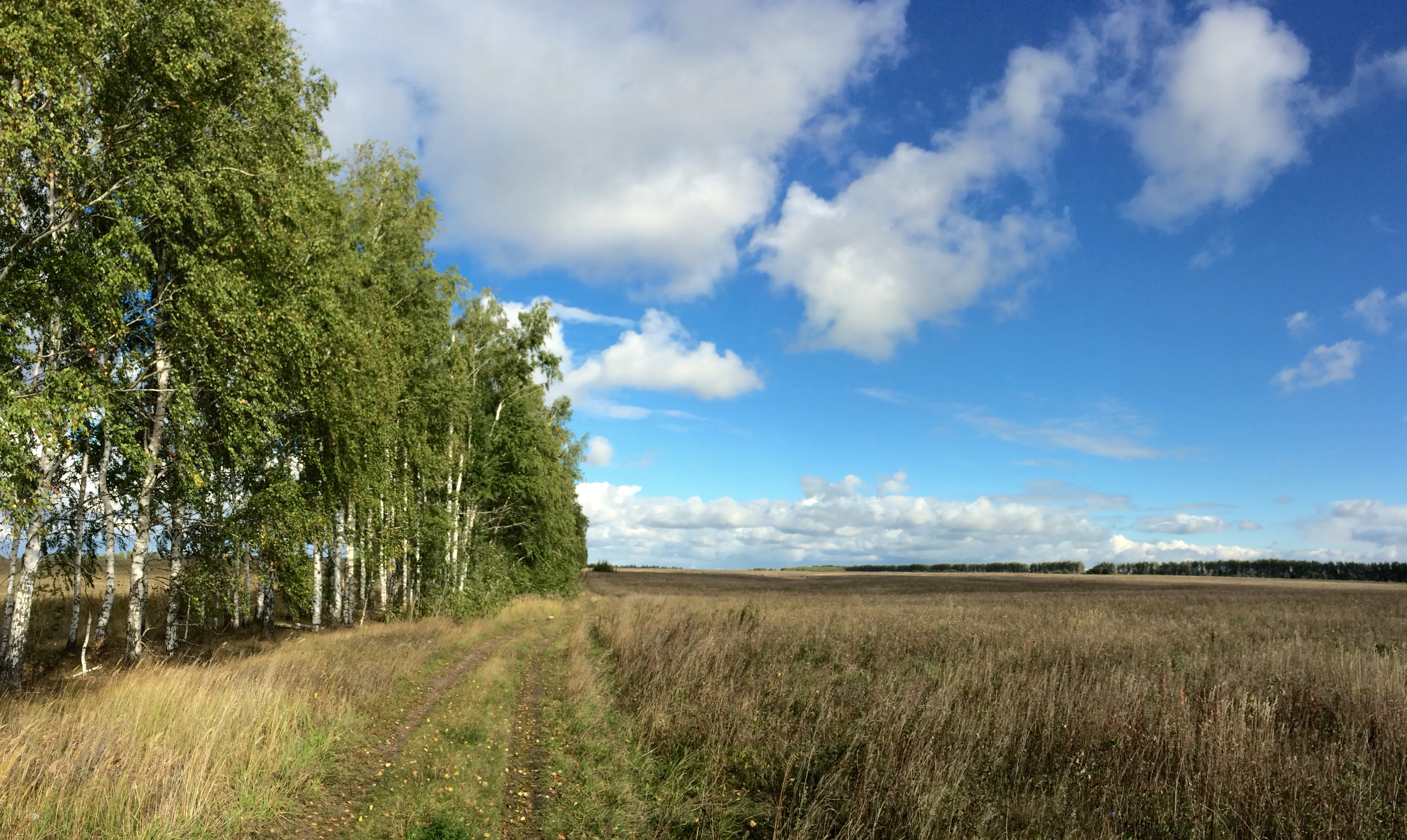
- Field near village Zarubkino, Zubovo-Polyansky District

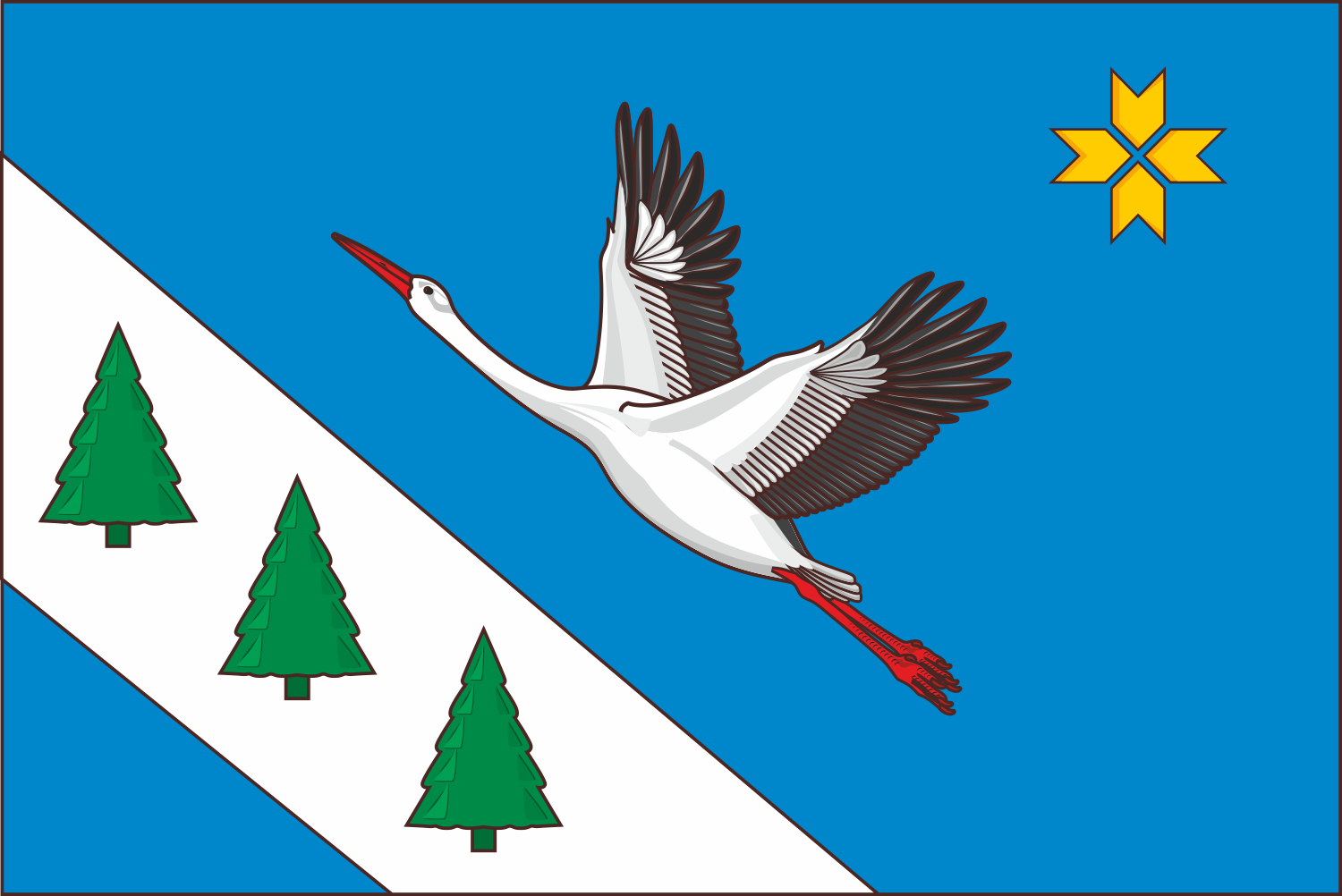
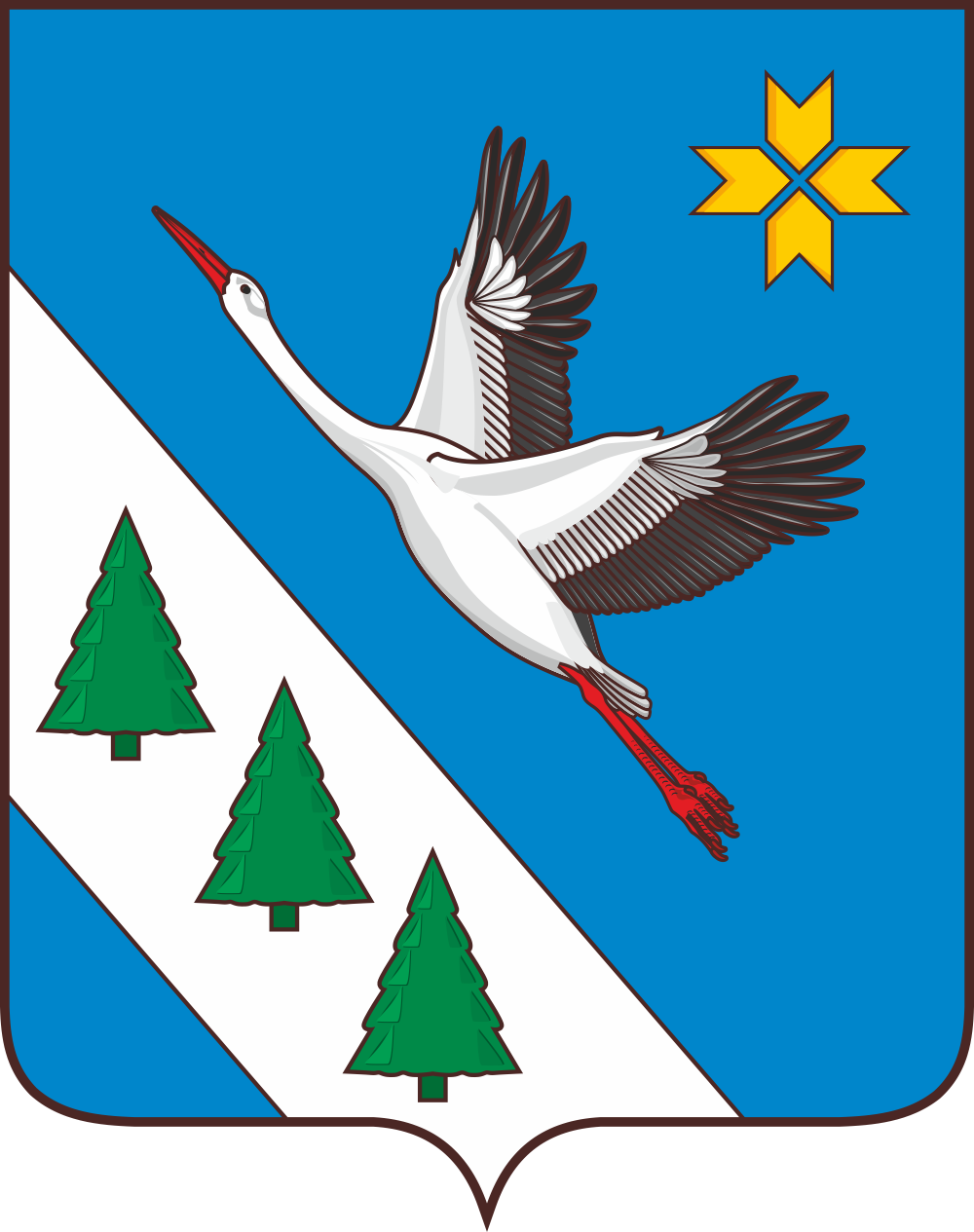
- Flag Coat of arms
- Location of Zubovo-Polyansky District in the Republic of Mordovia
- Coordinates: 54°05′N 42°49′E
- Country: Russia
- Federal subject: Republic of Mordovia
- Established: 16 July 1928
- Administrative center: Zubova Polyana

Area
  - Total: 2,710 km^{2} (1,050 sq mi)

Population (2010 Census)
  - Total: 59,256
  - Density: 21.9/km^{2} (56.6/sq mi)
  - Urban: 42.6%
  - Rural: 57.4%

Administrative structure
  - Administrative divisions: 4 Work settlements, 26 Selsoviets
  - Inhabited localities: 4 urban-type settlements, 90 rural localities

Municipal structure
  - Municipally incorporated as: Zubovo-Polyansky Municipal District
  - Municipal divisions: 4 urban settlements, 26 rural settlements
- Time zone: UTC+3 (MSK)
- OKTMO ID: 89621000
- Website: https://zpolyana-rm.ru/

Population of Zubovo-Polyansky District
- 2010 Census: 59,256
- 2002 Census: 65,735
- 1989 Census: 69,353
- 1979 Census: 66,363

Zubovo-Polyansky District (Russian: Зу́бово-Поля́нский райо́н; Moksha: Зубунь аймак, Zubuń ajmak; Erzya: Пейкужо буе, Pejkužo buje) is an administrative and municipal district (raion), one of the twenty-two in the Republic of Mordovia, Russia. It is located in the west of the republic. The area of the district is 2,710 square kilometers (1,050 sq mi). Its administrative center is the urban locality (a work settlement) of Zubova Polyana. As of the 2010 Census, the total population of the district was 59,256, with the population of Zubova Polyana accounting for 17.5% of that number.

== Administrative and municipal status ==
Within the framework of administrative divisions, Zubovo-Polyansky District is one of the twenty-two in the republic. It is divided into four work settlements (administrative divisions with the administrative centers in the work settlements (inhabited localities) of Potma, Umyot, Yavas, and Zubova Polyana) and twenty-six selsoviets, all of which comprise ninety rural localities. As a municipal division, the district is incorporated as Zubovo-Polyansky Municipal District. The four work settlements are incorporated into four urban settlements, and the twenty-six selsoviets are incorporated into twenty-six rural settlements within the municipal district. The work settlement of Zubova Polyana serves as the administrative center of both the administrative and municipal district.

== Notable residents ==
- Vladimir Dezhurov (born 1962 in Yavas), cosmonaut
- Viktor Kidyayev (born 1956 in Zhukovka), politician
