= Zubova Polyana =

Zubova Polyana Зубова Поляна
- Work settlement

Other transcription(s)
  - Moksha: Зубу
- Interactive map of Zubova Polyana
- Location of Zubova Polyana Zubova Polyana (Republic of Mordovia)
- Coordinates: 54°05′00″N 42°49′00″E
- Country: Russia
- Federal subject: Mordovia
- Administrative district: Zubovo-Polyansky District
- Work SettlementSelsoviet: Zubova Polyana Work Settlement

Population (2010 Census)
  - Total: 10,338
  - Estimate (2021): 10,996 (+6.4%)

Administrative status
  - Capital of: Zubovo-Polyansky District, Zubova Polyana Work Settlement

Municipal status
  - Municipal district: Zubovo-Polyansky Municipal District
  - Urban settlement: Zubovo-Polyanskoye Urban Settlement
  - Capital of: Zubovo-Polyansky Municipal District, Zubovo-Polyanskoye Urban Settlement
- Time zone: UTC+3 (MSK)
- Postal codes: 431110, 431111, 431169
- Dialing code: +7 83458
- OKTMO ID: 89621151051

Zubova Polyana population
- 2010 Census: 10,338
- 2002 Census: 10,355
- 1989 Census: 10,715
- 1979 Census: 9,672

Zubova Polyana (Russian: Зу́бова Поля́на; Moksha: Зубу, Zubu) is an urban locality (a work settlement) and the administrative center of Zubovo-Polyansky District of the Republic of Mordovia, Russia. As of the 2010 Census, its population was 10,338.

== Administrative and municipal status ==
Within the framework of administrative divisions, Zubova Polyana serves as the administrative center of Zubovo-Polyansky District. As an administrative division, the work settlement of Zubova Polyana, together with four rural localities, is incorporated within Zubovo-Polyansky District as Zubova Polyana Work Settlement. As a municipal division, Zubova Polyana Work Settlement is incorporated within Zubovo-Polyansky Municipal District as Zubovo-Polyanskoye Urban Settlement.
