= Andrei Yurkin =

Russian serial killer and rapist

- Born: Andrei Nikolaevich Yurkin; 26 May 1970 (age 56); Staroe Kachaevo, Mordovian ASSR, RSFSR
- Other name: "The Mordovian Maniac"
- Conviction: Murder x5
- Penalty: Death; commuted to 15 years

Details
- Victims: 5
- Span of crimes: 1994–1995
- Country: Russia
- State: Mordovia
- Date apprehended: 2 March 1995

Andrei Nikolaevich Yurkin (Russian: Андрей Николаевич Юркин; born 26 May 1970), known as The Mordovian Maniac (Russian: Мордовский маньяк), is a Russian serial killer and rapist who, together with two accomplices, raped and killed five women in Saransk and its suburbs from 1994 to 1995.

After being initially sentenced to death for his crimes, Yurkin's sentence was commuted to 15 years imprisonment by the Supreme Court due to the moratorium on capital punishment. He served out the remainder of his sentence and was released in 2009.

== Early life ==
Andrei Nikolaevich Yurkin was born on 26 May 1970, in the village of Staroe Kachaevo, in the Mordovian ASSR. Little is known of his early life, but according to friends and relatives, the Yurkins were known as good, law-abiding citizens with no known issues. In his youth, Yurkin began to show interest in bodybuilding, and after graduating high school, he left his native village and moved to Saransk.

In 1992, he started work as a policeman in the regional branch of the Ministry of Internal Affairs, where he attained the rank of sergeant. He later married and had a son, and together with his family, Yurkin lived in a dormitory on Transportnaya Street. He would spend most of his free time at a local gym, where he would become acquainted with various criminals. At the time, Yurkin was known for his impressive muscular physique, and was described in a positive light by both friends and acquaintances.

== Murders ==
Yurkin, together with 34-year-old Andrei Kostin and 16-year-old Valery Lavrushkin, started committing his first crimes in August 1994, when the trio began robbing and assaulting women. They committed their first murder on November 1 of that year, when they came across 24-year-old Natalya Yakushnina, who was returning home from her friend's house on Studentskaya Street late that evening. Unlike the previous victims, Yakushnina recognized the men from the local gym and threatened to turn them over to the police. In response, Yurkin strangled her and then dragged the body to a nearby garage, where he covered it with snow, branches and garbage. After their capture, Kostin and Lavrushkin claimed that the murder was entirely Yurkin's doing, and after experiencing great pleasure from the killing, he would start carrying a clothesline on him in future attacks.

On 24 December, Yurkin and Lavrushkin picked up 19-year-old Svetlana Marochkina on the pretense of giving her a ride to Ruzayevka. On the way, they unexpectedly turned towards Zykovo and stopped at an abandoned building, where Kostin was waiting for them. There, Yurkin and Kostin took turns raping her, but after they were finished, Marochkina managed to escape and ran behind the building. However, Yurkin caught up with her, took off her scarf, strangled her, and then dragged the corpse to a nearby wall, where he covered it up with snow.

On 25 January 1995, Yurkin met 21-year-old Elena Popazova, a student from Ulyanovsk who was studying at the Pedagogical Institute in Saransk. He invited her to take a walk with him and possibly have a drink, which Popazova accepted. Under this pretense, Yurkin lured her another building of the institute, where he raped and strangled her. After the murder, he stole her fur coat, boots, watch and hat, before throwing the body into a pit and covering it with snow. Her body was found on 7 March.

On 23 February, the trio travelled to the village of Dobrovolny, where they kidnapped 34-year-old Natalia Radaikina while she was returning home from a store. They then drove to an abandoned building, where they collectively raped and strangled her, before rummaging through her handbag and stealing all valuable items from it. Radaikina's body was found two days later. On 25 February, Yurkin murdered 21-year-old Galina Budnikova, whose body was found near a dormitory on Ulyanov Street two days later.

== Arrest ==
While investigating the murders, authorities noticed that all of them were committed in locations frequented by Yurkin and his friends, due to which they were placed under surveillance. On 2 March, Yurkin was arrested, and in the subsequent interrogations, he confessed to the murders and implicated Kostin and Lavrushkin as his helpers. While searching through the latter's home, police found earrings belonging to Radaikina, as well as other items later identified as having been stolen from other victims.

== Trial ==
The trial began on 6 December 1995, with the three defendants being charged with 26 crimes of varying severity involving 13 victims in total (five fatal and eight non-fatal). At trial, Yurkin pleaded not guilty and insisted that he was a simple witness, accusing Kostin and Lavrushkin of being the actual killers. His version of events was not considered, and he was subsequently convicted on all counts. On 22 July 1996, the Supreme Court of Mordovia sentenced Yurkin to death. After the announcement of the verdict, he burst into tears and rested his face on the shoulder of a guard who entered his cage. Lavrushkin and Kostin were also found guilty on all counts, but as the courts considered them as simple accomplices, they were given 10 and 6 years imprisonment, respectively.

Soon afterwards, in an attempt to have his sentence commuted, Yurkin wrote a 44-page appeal to the appellate court in Moscow. In the statement, he insisted that he was innocent and said that he had an alibi for some of the murders, while additionally claiming that the evidence against him was circumstantial and that he had not received a fair trial, as the police and the prosecutor's office had tortured him into confessing. To further reinforce his argument that the death penalty was a cruel punishment, Yurkin cited the case of Andrei Chikatilo, pointing out that several men had been wrongfully imprisoned and one even executed for crimes committed by him. He also heavily used the words "God" and "Lord" in his text, in an attempt to make it more expressive.

For context, this is a fragment from Yurkin's appeal: "Dear judges, you certainly remember when absolutely innocent people were shot in the Chikatilo case. And how many innocent people were convicted! I understand that you are looking for a criminal in every person. I am not asking you to reduce my sentence, I am asking you to justify me: I have never been a murderer. As a sign of proof, if yo wish, I will kill myself, but after that acquit me! Honorable court, believe in the cry of my soul and acquit me! I literally ate myself from my sins, and I repent! I regret very much that I did not turn in Lavrushkin and Kostin at once. I would have lived and raised my son now, whom I was waiting for and loved. The last proof that I was innocent was that God kept me safe and gave me strength to go through all the torture. And what torture was like, God forbid that for anyone. I prayed to God to live until the trial and then be acquitted. Dear court, please allow me to show my tooth, which was ground with a file during torture in the militia. I will wait for your answer here on death row..." During this period, President Boris Yeltsin imposed a moratorium on capital punishment, which led the Supreme Court to reduce Yurkin's sentence to the maximum 15 years imprisonment on 10 March 1999. Subsequently, the press service for the Supreme Court released a statement in which they outlined their reasoning for the decision.

On 22 May 1999, Yurkin was transported to a prison in Chistopol, Tatarstan, where he spent the first few years of his imprisonment. In 2003, journalists attempted to scheduled an interview with him, but while the prison management allowed it, Yurkin refused, claiming he did not want to talk to the press. In mid-2005, he was transferred to a high-security penal colony in the Ryazan Oblast. During his imprisonment, Yurkin continued practicing bodybuilding and maintained his physique. According to some reports, the colony administration considered him a troublesome inmate.

== Release ==
In April 2009, Yurkin was released and returned to Staroe Kachaevo, where his father and sister still lived. As a felon, he was registered with the local police department's migration service, which was headed by his classmate Ivan Bochkarev. Since his release, Yurkin has led a very secluded life and has avoided publicity, but reportedly has not shown any aggressive behaviour towards others.

After having his passport renewed, Yurkin left Mordovia and moved to the Moscow Oblast, where he found a place to live and started work as a private taxi driver. In subsequent years, he moved to Saint Petersburg, where he makes his living as a trucker, but since 2015, it has been reported that he has returned to Mordovia.: According to the representatives of the Bolsheignatovsky District Administration, Yurkin annually visits his sister and other relatives in Staroe Kachaevo and stays for several weeks, but ever since his release, he has not committed any crimes and is considered rehabilitated.

== See also ==
- List of serial rapists
- List of Russian serial killers
