= Dmitry Balakin =

Russian spree killer

Dmitry Nikolayevich Balakin (Russian: Дми́трий Никола́евич Бала́кин; born February 24, 1985, in Ruzayevka, Mordovian ASSR, RSFSR), known as the "Saransk Maniac", is a Russian serial killer. He was found guilty of the murder of three people, rape and robbery, and was sentenced to life imprisonment.

== Biography ==
Balakin was born in the Ruzayevsky District as the family's second child, having two brothers. In his youth, he was aggressive, and in the senior classes always demanded money from weaker classmates and lower grade students, and then from passers-by. From 2000 to 2002, he was held four times as criminally responsible, but being a minor, he was only dismissed only with warnings and conditional terms.

In 2003, in the hope of getting rid of problems with law enforcement agencies, the family moved to Nizhny Novgorod. However, Dmitry's behavior did not change and just a few days after the move, he robbed two women's valuables, and was soon detained by police officers. The court sentenced him to two years in a prison colony. However, in the second half of 2004, Balakin was released early for exemplary behavior.

For some time Dmitry lived with his mother and brothers in the Nizhny Novgorod Oblast, but in March 2005 he returned to Saransk. He first got a job as a night watchman at a construction site, then as an auto mechanic. He soon met 30-year-old Elena Arkhipova, whom had a son, and they began to live together. Balakin was regarded positively by his neighbors.

=== Murders ===
On September 1, 2005, Balakin met with 20-year-old student Kristina Fedyakina, who was returning home late at night, and volunteered to accompany her to her house, to which she agreed. Just a few meters away from the house, Balakin forced the girl into the bush, where he raped her. The shocked girl then walked calmly to the house after the sexual act. Balakin, by his own words, felt an unprecedented physical and emotional upsurge. He caught up with the victim, dragged her back into the bushes where he raped her again, and then strangled her with the harness of her bag. Then he stole a purse, a mobile phone, as well as all jewelry and valuables from her bag, and disappeared.

In the evening of September 8, 2005, Balakin met with student Ekaterina Tarasova near a store, and offered to accompany her home, to which she agreed. In the first secluded place, he raped and then strangled her with jacket sleeves, then took her wallet, earrings, gold cross and a ring from her hand, fleeing afterwards.

Two weeks later, on September 22, 2005, Balakin got acquainted with one more student - Yulia Lanchina, with whom he spent several hours visiting the café and the club, raping and then strangling her with her own sneakers' laces a few meters from her house. He then took her earrings and two rings and left the crime scene, later giving them to his wife Elena.

On September 24, 2005, Balakin stole a car from the autoshop he worked at, in order to "ride", but failed to manage it and hit a pole at high speed. He suffered a lot of fractures and had to spend the next 6 months in hospital, which temporarily stopped the attacks.

At the end of March 2006, Balakin left the hospital with a disability - he began to limp heavily with his left leg. Despite this, in April 2006 he went on "hunting" again. This time, Elena Sosnina, the victim of choice, resisted Balakin, who attempted to rape her, but she managed to escape. The limping Balakin, unable to catch up with her, took her wallet and mobile phone from the bag she dropped and disappeared. Sosnina appealed to the police, and also managed to find the criminal's phone, inserting the SIM card into her phone and making a call. Calculating from where the call occurred from, police arrived at Arkhipova's apartment. Initially, Arkhipova tried to lie to the investigators, claiming that she bought the phone from an unknown man for 3,000 rubles, but soon admitted that her 21-year-old cohabitant, Dmitry Balakin, had brought the phone. However, she did not know his location.

=== Arrest ===
Balakin was declared in the federal wanted list on suspicion of committing a series of murders. Ambushes were arranged at his mother's apartment and his cohabitant's, however, Balakin sensed something was off and stopped going there. Despite knowing that he was sought after, a few weeks after the attack on Elena Sosnina, Balakin attacked Elena Toropova walking with her child. Having raped her, he decided not to kill her in front of the child, and only took her purse. After some time in the elevator of an apartment, Balakin attacked Maria Perminova, but her husband struck the maniac in the groin, forcing him to run away from the scene.

On July 20, 2006, police officers who were left on duty at the mother's apartment in Saransk detained a girl who tried to break in. It turned out that she was the daughter of Balakin's younger brother, sent by Dmitry to check out the apartment. She told that he was hiding in an apartment rented by his brother, and a few hours later the killer was finally captured.

=== Interrogations, trial and verdict ===
During the investigation of the murders, the investigators:

- Developed 11 versions.
- 51 searches were carried out.
- Conducted more than 200 examinations.
- Interrogated more than 900 witnesses.
- Checked for involvement 272 suspects.

Initially, Balakin denied any involvement in any of the attacks and murders. However, Elena Sosnina, Elena Toropova and Maria Perminova identified him as the criminal who attacked them. A DNA examination was also conducted, which showed that the sperm from Fedyakina's murder completely matched Balakin's. After this, he began to give confessions. On September 25, 2006, the court found Dmitry Balakin guilty of murdering three people, as well as multiple rapes and robberies, and sentenced him to life imprisonment in a special regime colony. The Supreme Court of Russia left the verdict unchanged. He served his sentence in the correctional colony "Mordovian Zone" in a village in the Zubovo-Polyansky District. A little later he was transferred to the Torbeevsky Central.

=== In the media ===
- Criminal Chronicles: "Unbrindled instinct".
