= 9 km =

9 km (Russian: 9 км) is the name of several rural localities in Russia:

- 9 km, Republic of Mordovia, a settlement of the crossing in Plodopitomnichesky Selsoviet of Ruzayevsky District of the Republic of Mordovia; 54°00′50″N 45°00′12″E
- 9 km, Orenburg Oblast, a crossing loop in Barabanovsky Selsoviet of Novosergiyevsky District of Orenburg Oblast; 52°11′11″N 53°29′39″E

== See also ==
- 9-y km Mamayevskoy zheleznodorozhnoy vetki, a rural locality (a settlement) in Kletnyansky District of Bryansk Oblast
- Putevaya Usadba 9 km zheleznoy dorogi Luostari–Nikel, a rural locality (an inhabited locality) in Pechengsky District of Murmansk Oblast
- Tupik 9 km, a rural locality (a settlement) in Zubovo-Polyansky District of the Republic of Mordovia
- Devyaty kilometre, name of Solnechny, a rural locality (a settlement) in Usolsky District of Perm Krai, before 2013
