= Saransk Airport =

Airport in Mordovia, Russia

Saransk International Airport Сарансконь Арась арось Аэропорт
- New Terminal constructed in 2018

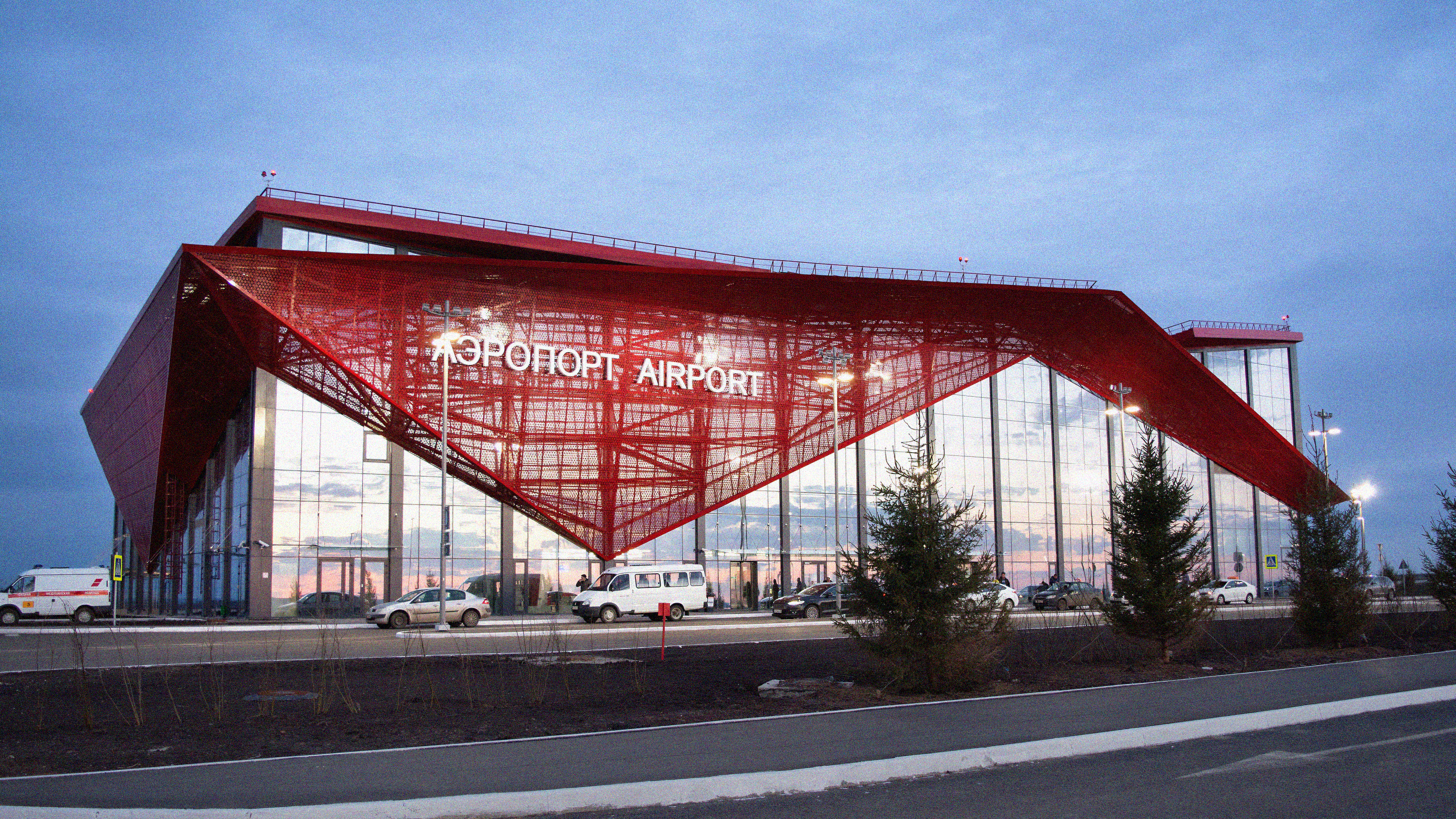
- IATA: SKX; ICAO: UWPS

Summary
- Airport type: Public
- Owner: Administration of Civil Airports
- Location: Saransk
- Elevation AMSL: 676 ft / 206 m
- Coordinates: 54°7′30″N 45°12′54″E
- Website: aviamordovia.ru
- Interactive map of Saransk International Airport

Runways
Direction	Length		Surface
Direction	ft	m	Surface
02/20	9,190	2,802	Asphalt

Saransk International Airport (Erzya: Сарансконь Арась арось Аэропорт, Moksha: Сарансконь Арась орш Аэропорт, Russian: Международный Аэропорт Саранск) (IATA: SKX, ICAO: UWPS) is an international airport in Mordovia, Russia located 7 km southeast of Saransk. It serves small airliners, but has undergone a major renovation in 2017 in time for the 2018 FIFA World Cup.

== History ==
Since the second half of the 1940s, the Lyambir military airfield was used as an airport. In 1955, a civil airport was built in the city limits, in the area of what is nowadays Gagarin Street.

And in 1960, a new airport was opened in its current place, near the village of Lukhovka, 5 km south-east of Saransk city center. In 1964, a new terminal was built. In 1981, a concrete runway was commissioned, which allowed the airport to accept modern turbojet Tu-134 and Yak-42 aircraft. In 1988, the airport reached its peak: the number of take-offs reached 14 thousand flights a year. Following the dissolution of the Soviet Union the number of flights decreased. The airport was not subject to privatization and is fully owned by the unitary enterprise Administration of Civil Airports (Russian: АГАА).

In 2014, the concept of modernization was defined: the runway extension, the demolition of the existing terminal and its replacement by a new one. In 2015, the airport was given the status of an international airport as part of the preparations for hosting the 2018 FIFA World Cup, which also includes reconstruction of the airport in order to accommodate traffic expected for the World Cup matches that will take place in Saransk. Reconstruction started on 1 January 2017. The runway was extended from 2,801 to 3,221 meters and reinforced with asphalt concrete. The airport is now able to receive such aircraft as the Boeing 737 and Airbus A320. Also new taxiways, air traffic control facilities had been built and the apron had been expanded. A new permanent domestic passenger terminal with an area of 7,000 square meters had been built with capacity of 300 passengers per hour. It was designed by FGUP GPI and NII GA Aeroproject (Moscow). In addition, a temporary international terminal was built, which increased the capacity to 600 passengers per hour, for the time of the 2018 World Cup, and was dismantled after it.

The airport was opened after renovation on 1 February 2018 with the participation of Ministry Russian Minister Transport, Maksim Sokolov.

== Airlines and destinations ==
Airlines	Destinations
Azimuth	Mineralnye Vody, Saint Petersburg, Sochi
Red Wings Airlines	Saint Petersburg, Yekaterinburg; Seasonal charter: Antalya, Sharm El-Sheikh
Rossiya Airlines	Moscow–Sheremetyevo
UVT Aero	Kazan

== Transportation ==
The airport is located 7 km south-east of the city center.

As of November 2018 there is public transportation service to/from the airport by bus and taxi.

== Statistics ==
Traffic figures at Saransk Airport
Year	Passengers
2014	28,800
2015	30,400
2016	31,100
2017	(closed for renovations)
2018	130
2019	90,552

== See also ==
- List of airports in Russia
