= Mordovia Arena =

Russian stadium

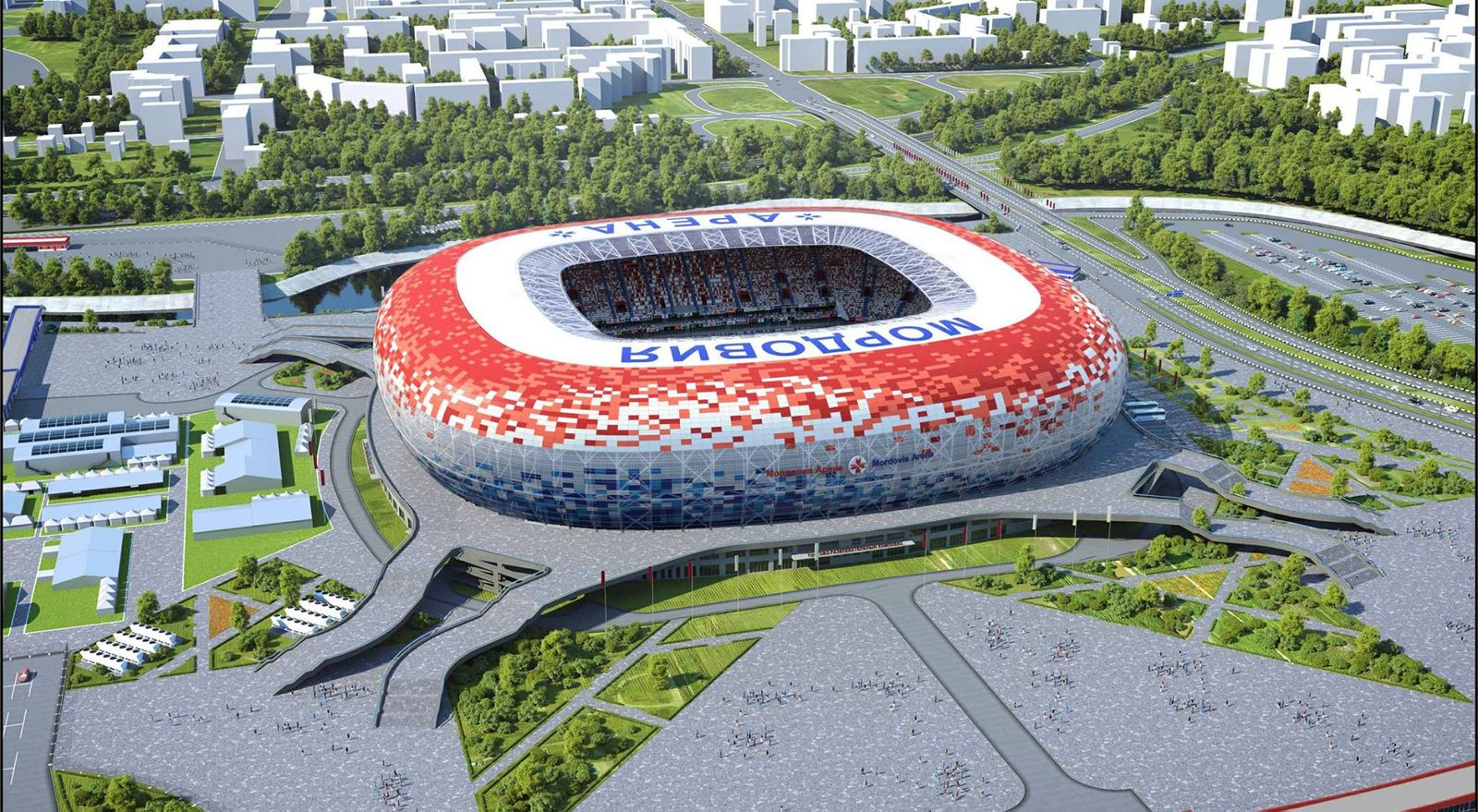
- UEFA
- Interactive map of Mordovia Arena
- Full name: Mordovia Arena
- Location: Volgogradskaya Ulitsa 1, Saransk, Mordovia, Russia
- Coordinates: 54°10′58″N 45°12′05″E
- Operator: FC Mordovia Saransk
- Capacity: 44,442
- Surface: Grass
- Field size: 105 by 68 m (344 by 223 ft)

Construction
- Groundbreaking: 2010
- Built: 2010–2018
- Opened: 21 April 2018
- Cost: $300 million
- Architect: SaranskGrazhdanProekt

Tenants
- Russia national football team (selected matches); FC Mordovia Saransk (2018–2020); FC Tambov (2019–2021); FC Saransk (2021–2022)

Mordovia Arena (Russian: «Мордовия Арена») is a football stadium in Saransk, Mordovia, Russia built for the 2018 FIFA World Cup. It hosted FC Mordovia Saransk, prior to their dissolution in 2020 from the Russian Professional Football League, replacing Start Stadium. It has a capacity of 44,442 spectators. The total area of the facility is 122,700 sq m.

The Arena is located in the central part of the city and is within a walking distance of the city's key infrastructure. The stadium design is based on the image of the sun, the main symbol of ancient myths and legends of the Mordvin people. After the FIFA World Cup, the stadium is expected to serve as Saransk and Mordovia's largest sports and leisure center.

== History ==
The decision to construct a new stadium in Saransk, a city 200 miles south-east of Moscow with a population of 330,000, had been made before Russia's bid to host the FIFA World Cup was approved. The Arena was planned to be built between 2010 and 2012 and to be completed for two events: Spartakiad and celebration of the Millennium of the Unity Between the Mordovian People and the Peoples of the Russian State. But as FIFA's regulations stipulate a minimum capacity of 45,000 people the original plans were changed and the opening postponed when Saransk was listed as World Cup host city. Sport-Engineering is the stadium's developer. On 2 November 2017, the field in the stadium received its first mowing. The stadium hosted its first match on 21 April 2018, a football match between Mordovia and FC Zenit-Izhevsk.

At the end of 2017, the new stadium in Saransk took its final appearance intended by the design. The finished steel skeleton of the arena was covered with finishing panels, serving as the key design feature of the construction. The surrounding ground was improved, the indoor premises were finished and elevators were installed. The construction of the stadium made it possible to solve a number of large-scale urban planning problems for the provincial city: a new park has been laid out, the embankment of the Insar River has been developed, and the residential area has been linked to the city center. The area was improved with a space for recreation, public festivities and leisure activities.

== Location ==
The stadium is located in the central part of Saransk, on the eastern bank of the Insar River. The stadium can be accessed by car and public transportation, special shuttle buses from the airport, railway station and hotels and from pick up parking points. The key hotels, fan area, and sightseeing attractions are also located within a minimum distance from the arena. It is bordered in the north in Volgogradskaya street and in the east in Yubileniy micro district (Russian: Микрорайон Юбилейный) which was constructed in the second decade of the 21st century, along with the construction of the stadium. The stadium is located in the central part of Saransk, on the eastern bank of the Insar River. The area where the stadium stands was in the past part of the village Posop which was incorporated to the city in 1958. The territory around the stadium was occupied by low-density traditional wooden housing. A birch grove and a gas station were demolished at the end of August 2010. A gas station, an auto repair center as well as 14 residential wooden houses were demolished with almost all of whose residents have received compensation for land and new apartments, in order to make place for the stadium.

== Design ==
In the bid to host the 2018 World Cup that was submitted to FIFA, Saransk's new stadium was shown with a temporary design by German architect (which is blamed to be copied from the Soccer City Stadium in South Africa, which hosted the opening and closing ceremonies, and final match of the 2010 FIFA World Cup) Tim Hupe. For the final look of the stadium a local company "Saransk Grazhdan Proekt" was chosen. The simple bowl-shaped venue is to have acid orange seats and capacity for 44,442 people, but only in tournament mode. After the 2018 World Cup, the upper stands are to be dismantled, decreasing capacity to 30,000. Between the stands left and the roof a promenade with retail and leisure spaces is to be created. The oval stadium will have a two-story basement and five floors. The stadium's turf is being imported from Canada and there will be 37 km of undersoil heating as well as overground heaters.

=== Engineering ===
The stadium has a high two-story stylobate covered with a bowl that is protected by the shell forming a canopy over the spectator seats. The main, western façade of the stadium faces the city's central part and the embankment of the Insar River. The stadium shell is composed of brightly colored perforated and solid metal panels.

The stands are divided into 4 sectors and subsectors and include a VIP box and a presidential box. Each sector has separate entrances, emergency exits, food outlets, first-aid stations and toilets, including facilities for people with disabilities. The stands have seats for spectators with limited mobility using wheelchairs and for their accompanying persons, as well as seats for people with hearing impairment, with information boards and video displays in their immediate line of sight.

The stadium has a specially designated sector for guest team fans with separate entrances, food outlets, first-aid stations, and toilets. The design envisages a separate family sector with playrooms nearby. The stadium has a media box, press conference room, mixed zone for players' communication with media, TV and radio broadcasting studios. In the future, the stadium is expected to serve as Saransk and Mordovia's largest sports and leisure center.

== Construction ==
Construction of the final fifth floor began in December 2015.

The walls and roof are made from a single shell of perforated metal panels in solar colours. These are supposed to represent warmth and hospitality. The galvanised roof base is made from profiled sheets that will have insulation and membrane coating laid over the top.

Construction on the stadium was completed in April 2018.

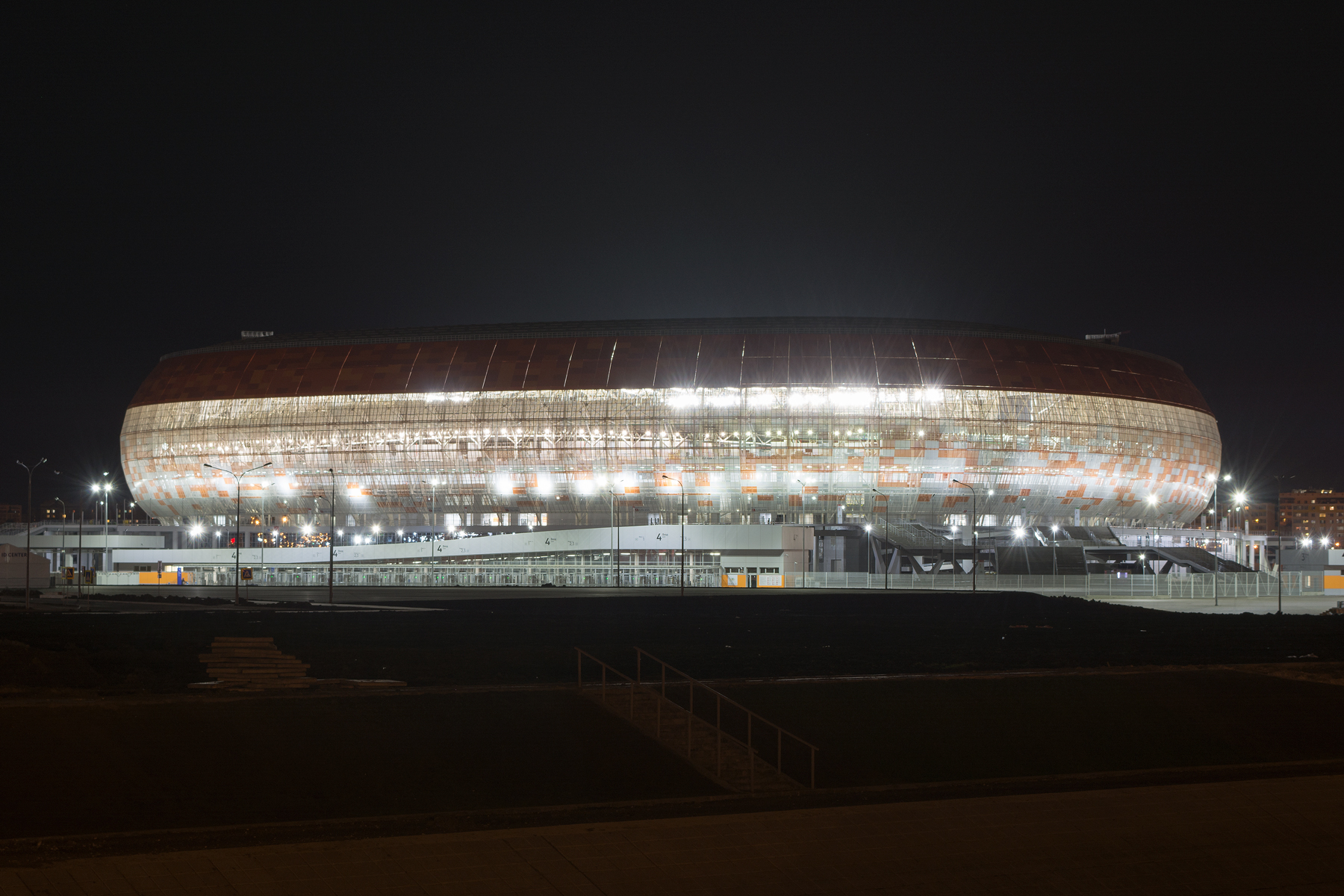
Stadium in the nighttime

== 2018 FIFA World Cup ==
The stadium hosted four group stage matches of the 2018 FIFA World Cup. A test match was scheduled for 21 April 2018.

What is impressive is that Japan caused a giant killing known as the "Saransk Miracle". This is the common name in Japan for the match in which Japan, ranked 61st in the FIFA rankings, defeated Colombia, ranked 16th in the FIFA rankings, 2–1.

Date	Time	Team #1	Result	Team #2	Round	Attendance
16 June 2018	19:00	Peru	0–1	Denmark	Group C	40,502
19 June 2018	15:00	Colombia	1–2	Japan	Group H	40,842
25 June 2018	21:00	Iran	1–1	Portugal	Group B	41,685
28 June 2018	21:00	Panama	1–2	Tunisia	Group G	37,168
