= Lyambir =

Lyambir may refer to:

- Lyambir (air base), an air base in Russia
- Lyambir (rural locality), a rural locality (a selo) in the Republic of Mordovia, Russia
