= Opera and Ballet Theatre of Saransk =

Performance venue in Saransk, Russian Republic of Mordovia

Coordinates: 54°11′10″N 45°10′48″E

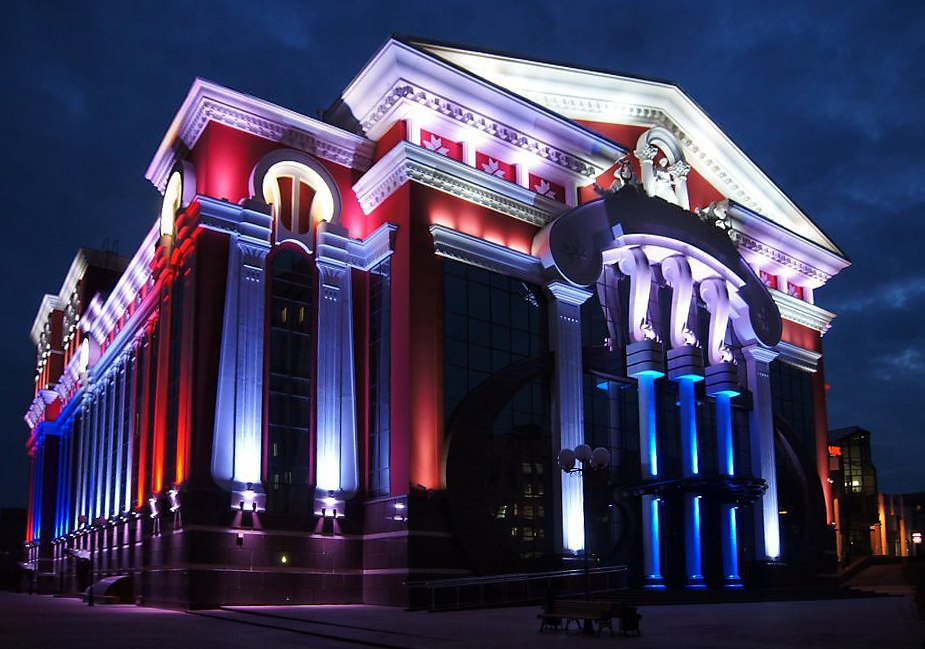
Night shot of the theatre

Opera and Ballet Theatre of Saransk was inaugurated on 1 September 1935 in Saransk, capital of the Russian Republic of Mordovia with Carl Millöcker's operetta Der Bettelstudent. The theatre includes 714 spectator places, 138 crystal lamps, make-up rooms, rehearsal ballet classes, a small hall for creative meetings and chamber concerts, the whole factory with fake and property-rooms shops. The new theatre has a mini-printing house and modern sound recording studio. The light and sound equipment – from the best producers of the US, Germany, England and Japan, a rotating scene, variable volume of the auditorium.

In 1994, the theatre was named after the Honored Artist of the RSFSR and People's Artist of the Mordovian ASSR, operatic bass Illarion Maksimovich Yaushev (1902–1961).
