= Kiryukov Music College =

Saransk Musical College L. P. Kiryukova
- Саранское Музыкальное училище им. Л. П. Кирюкова
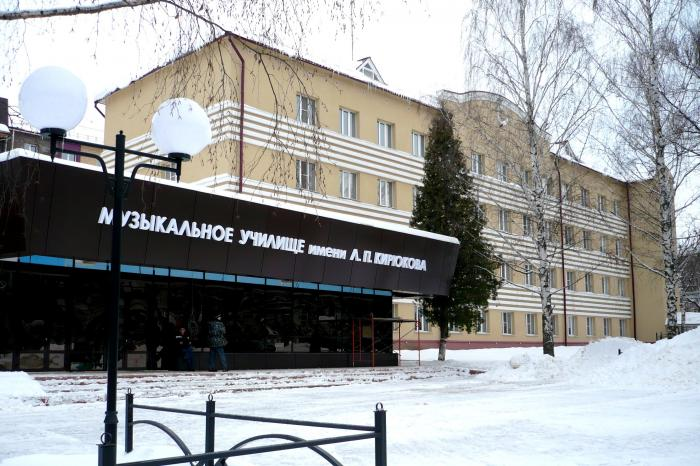
- Kiryukov Music College
- Saransk, Mordovia; Russia

Kiryukov Music College (Russian: Саранское музыкальное училище им. Л. П. Кирюкова, lit. 'Saransk Musical College L. P. Kiryukova') is a state government-financed institution of vocational education of Mordovia. The college was founded by the Ministry of Culture and Tourism of Mordovia and named after the Mordovian composer Leonty Petrovich Kiryukov.

Kiryukov Music College is a legal entity. It has a corporate seal, a state seal of the Republic of Mordovia, a state seal of Russia and other requisites in accord with the Russian law. Kiryukov Music College was founded on June 6, 1931.

In 2016 the teaching was carried out by 95 full-time teachers and accompanists as well as 6 part-time teachers. The college teachers organize music festivals, contests and competitions. Many of them participate in concerts and performing activities as soloists, members of orchestras and ensembles, music band leaders on a regular basis.

== History ==
Kiryukov Music College is one of the oldest education institutions of Mordovia. It was opened in 1932 and based on the music and drama studio of Mordovia. Originally the college was called Mordovia Music and Drama College. It included two departments: music (singing) and drama. Shortly after that the conducting and choral departments became parts of the college. The college students presented themselves to the public by staging three operas: "Eugene Onegin" by P.I. Tchaikovsky, "Mermaid" by A.S. Dargomyzhsky, "Faust" by Sh. Gounod under the leadership of the college director P.A. Organov, an honorary teacher of Mordovia. During the first two years the teaching staff was not numerous (6 teachers) as well as the number of first graduates (20 students). The first teachers of the school were: P. A. Organov, a singer and choral conductor, an honorary teacher of Mordovia; Z.A. Zaichikov, a singer and honorary teacher of Mordovia; L. P. Kiryukov, a composer and choral conductor, an honorary worker of arts of Russia and Mordovia, people's artist of Mordovia; M. N. Simansky, a pianist; V.I. Egunov, a performer on Russian folk instruments; Z. S. Vazhdaeva, a writer.

In 1937 the status of the college changed. There was an expansion of its structure. During the pre-war years the Music and Drama College included 5 departments (vocal, choral, orchestral, dramatic, teacher) and had about 200 students.

With the onset of World War II and until 1944, the college was closed because many of the students and teachers joined the Soviet Army and were off at the front. The last change in the status of the college was in 1966 when it was named after L. P. Kiryukov.

Today Kiryukov Music College has 7 departments. In June 2011 O. E. Simkina was appointed the college director.

== Concert hall ==
Seating capacity of the Hall: 300 seats
