= Dmitri Samarkin =

Russian footballer (born 1980)

Personal information
- Full name: Dmitri Vasilyevich Samarkin
- Date of birth: 14 May 1980 (age 46)
- Place of birth: Saransk, Russian SFSR
- Height: 1.84 m (6 ft 0 in)
- Position: Defender

Youth career
- FC Svetotekhnika Saransk

Senior career*
Years	Team	Apps	(Gls)
2000	FC Avtodor Saransk		
2001	FC Sareks Saransk		
2002–2004	FC Zhilishchnik Saransk		
2005–2008	FC Mordovia Saransk	84	(1)
2009	FC Metallurg-Kuzbass Novokuznetsk	11	(0)
2010	FC Vympel Romodanovo		
2010	FC Dynamo Kostroma	9	(0)
2011–2013	FC SvetoServis Kadoshkino		
2015	FC Santekhnik Saransk		
- * Club domestic league appearances and goals

Dmitri Vasilyevich Samarkin (Russian: Дмитрий Васильевич Самаркин; born 14 May 1980) is a former Russian professional football player.

== Club career ==
He played in the Russian Football National League for FC Mordovia Saransk in 2007.
