= Krasny Ugolok =

Settlement in Ruzayevsky District, Mordovia, Russia

Coordinates: 54°00′44″N 44°57′05″E

Krasny Ugolok (Russian: Кра́сный Уголо́к) is a settlement in Ruzayevsky District of the Republic of Mordovia, Russia.
