= Bezdna (Chuvashia) =

Bezdna, Pasna
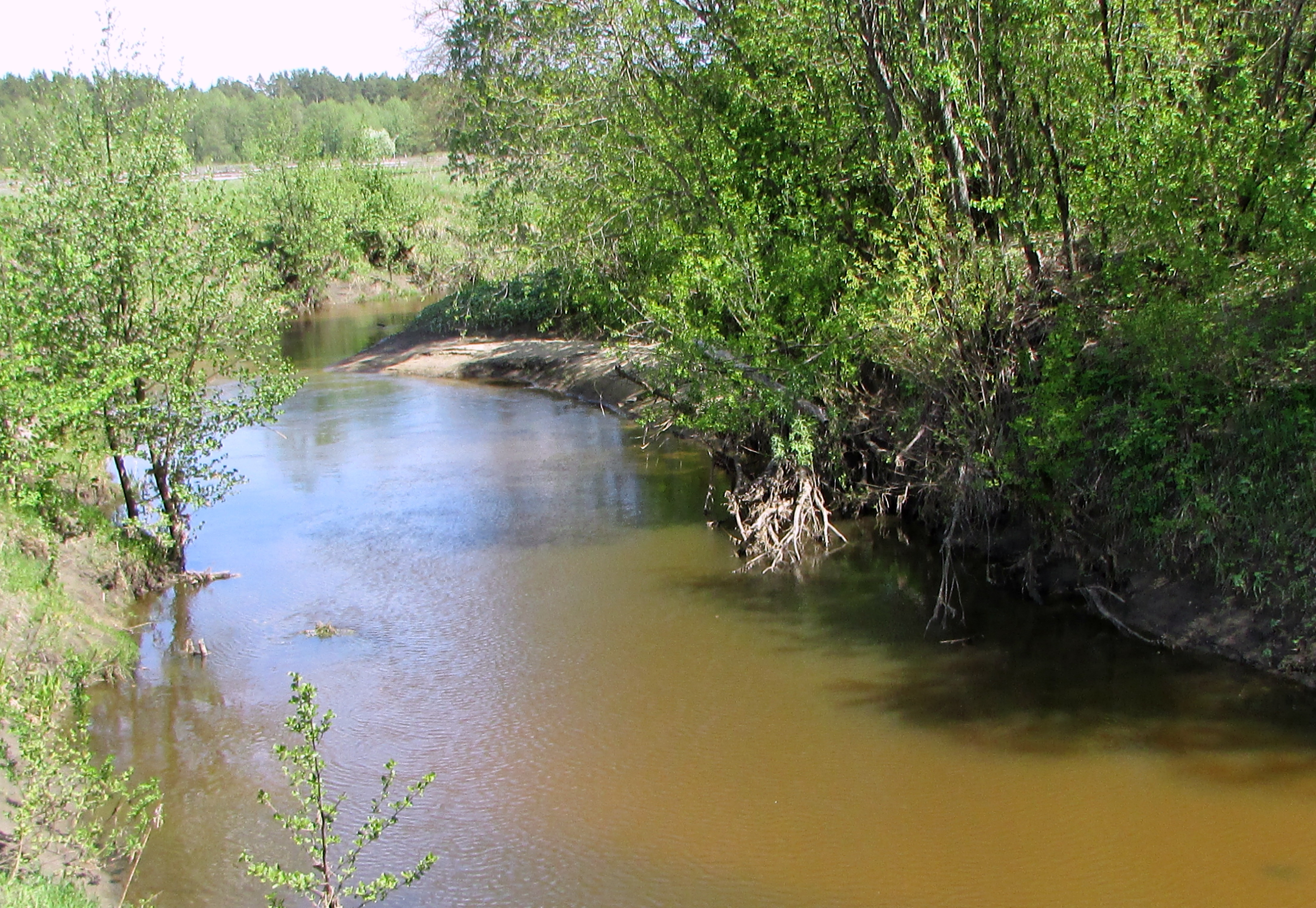

Location
- Country: Chuvashia, Russia

Physical characteristics
- Source
  - location: Shemurshinsky District
- Mouth: Sura
  - location: Alatyr, Alatyrsky District
  - coordinates: 54°49′43″N 46°37′19″E
- Length: 106 km (66 mi)
- Basin size: 1,320 km^{2} (510 sq mi)

Basin features
- Progression: Sura→ Volga→ Caspian Sea

The Bezdna (Russian: Бездна) or Pasna (Chuvash: Пасна) is a river in Chuvashia, Russian Federation, a right-bank tributary of the Sura. It is 106 kilometres (66 mi) long, and has a drainage basin of 1,320 square kilometres (510 sq mi).

Major tributaries are Abamza, Orbezdna, Black Bezdna. The maximal mineralization 500–700 mg/L. Average sediment in mouth per year is 71 mm. Drainage is regulated. In the upper stream use to dry.
