= Insar (river) =

River in the Mordovian republic of Russia

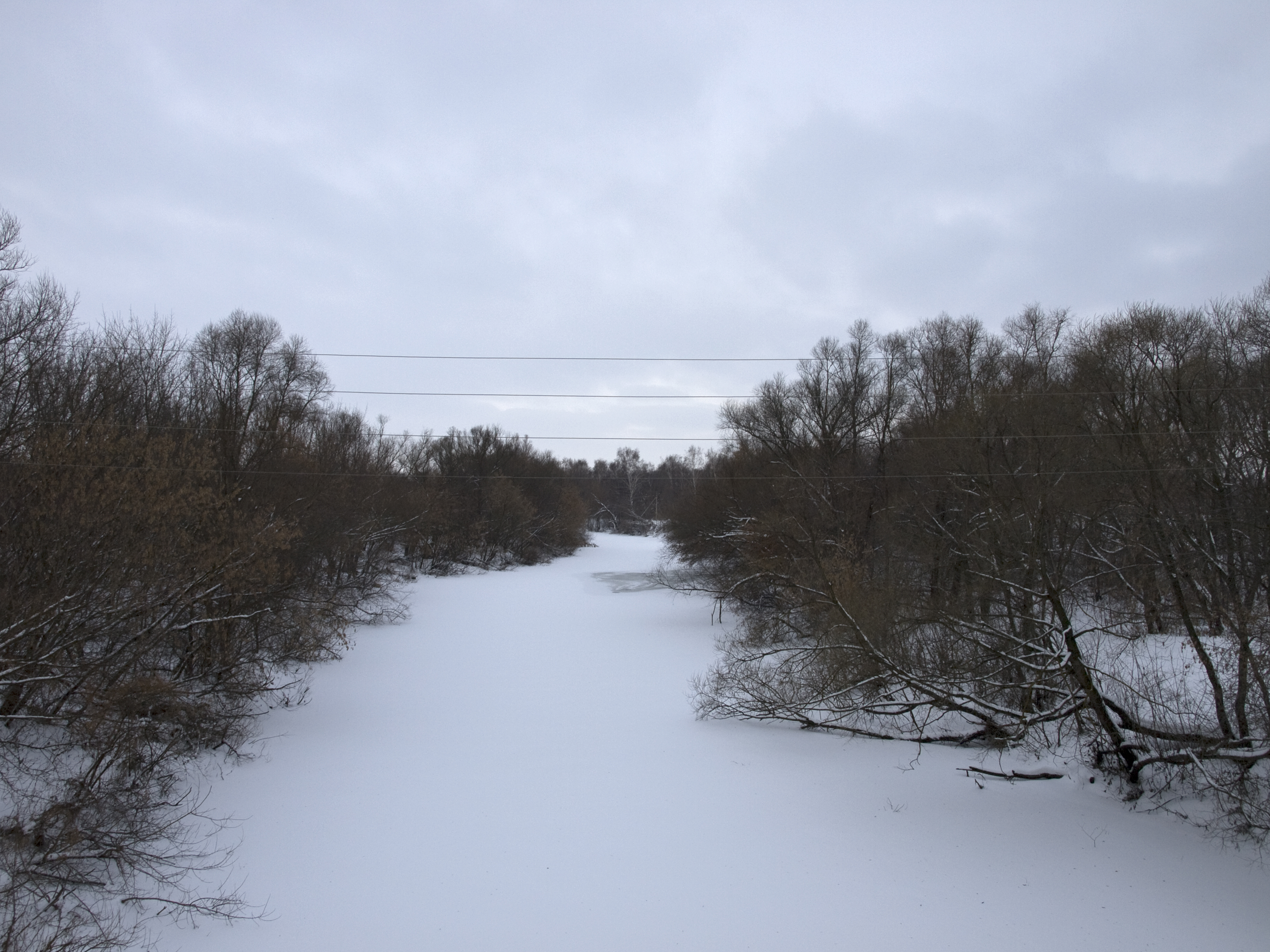
- Insar in the city of Saransk, frozen in winter.
- Native name: Инсар (Russian)

Location
- Country: Russia

Physical characteristics
- Mouth: Alatyr
  - coordinates: 54°42′53″N 45°18′07″E
- Length: 168 km (104 mi)
- Basin size: 3,860 km^{2} (1,490 sq mi)

Basin features
- Progression: Alatyr→ Sura→ Volga→ Caspian Sea

Insar (Russian: Инса́р, Erzya: Инесаро) is a river in the Mordovian republic of Russia. It is a right tributary of the Alatyr. It is 168 km long, with a drainage basin of 3860 km^{2}. The river gets most of its water from melting snow, and hence its discharge is at its highest during the spring thaw. Average discharge at Saransk is 7.71 m^{3}/s. The river freezes over in November, and is icebound until April.

Towns by the Insar are Ruzayevka and Saransk.
