= Mikhail Fedak =

Russian footballer

Personal information
- Full name: Mikhail Bogdanovich Fedak
- Date of birth: 6 April 2001 (age 25)
- Place of birth: Saransk, Russia
- Height: 1.77 m (5 ft 10 in)
- Position: Midfielder

Senior career*
Years	Team	Apps	(Gls)
2018–2020	FC Mordovia Saransk	11	(0)
2021–2023	FC Nosta Novotroitsk	52	(6)
2023	FC Kuban-Holding Pavlovskaya	15	(0)
- * Club domestic league appearances and goals as of 25 November 2023

Mikhail Bogdanovich Fedak (Russian: Михаил Богданович Федак; born 6 April 2001) is a Russian football player.

== Club career ==
He made his debut in the Russian Football National League for FC Mordovia Saransk on 7 July 2019 in a game against FC Neftekhimik Nizhnekamsk.
