= Ruzayevsky District =

Ruzayevsky District Рузаевский район (Russian)
- District

Other transcription(s)
  - Moksha: Орозаень аймак
  - Erzya: Рузайбуе
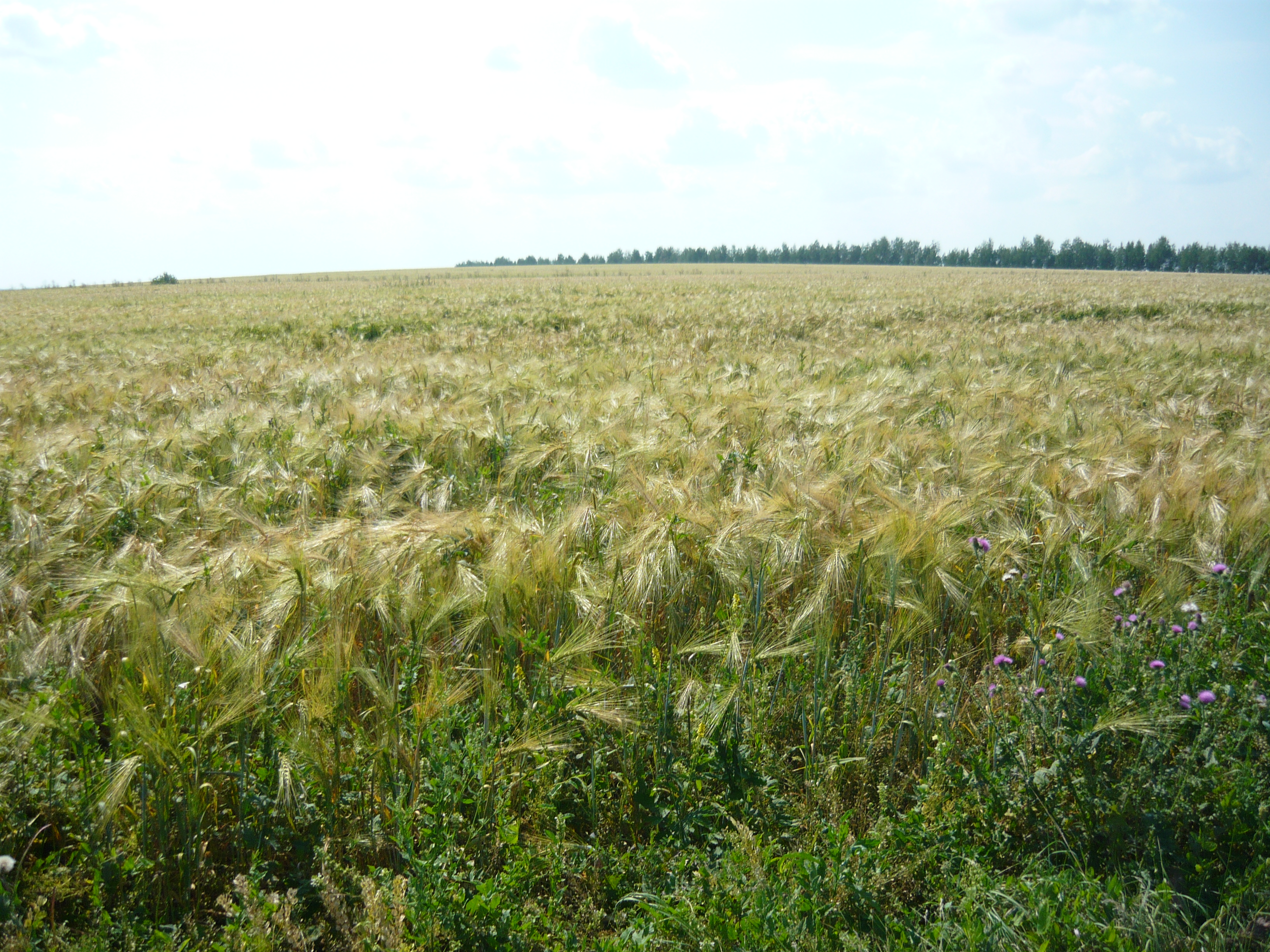
- Landscape in Ruzayevsky District

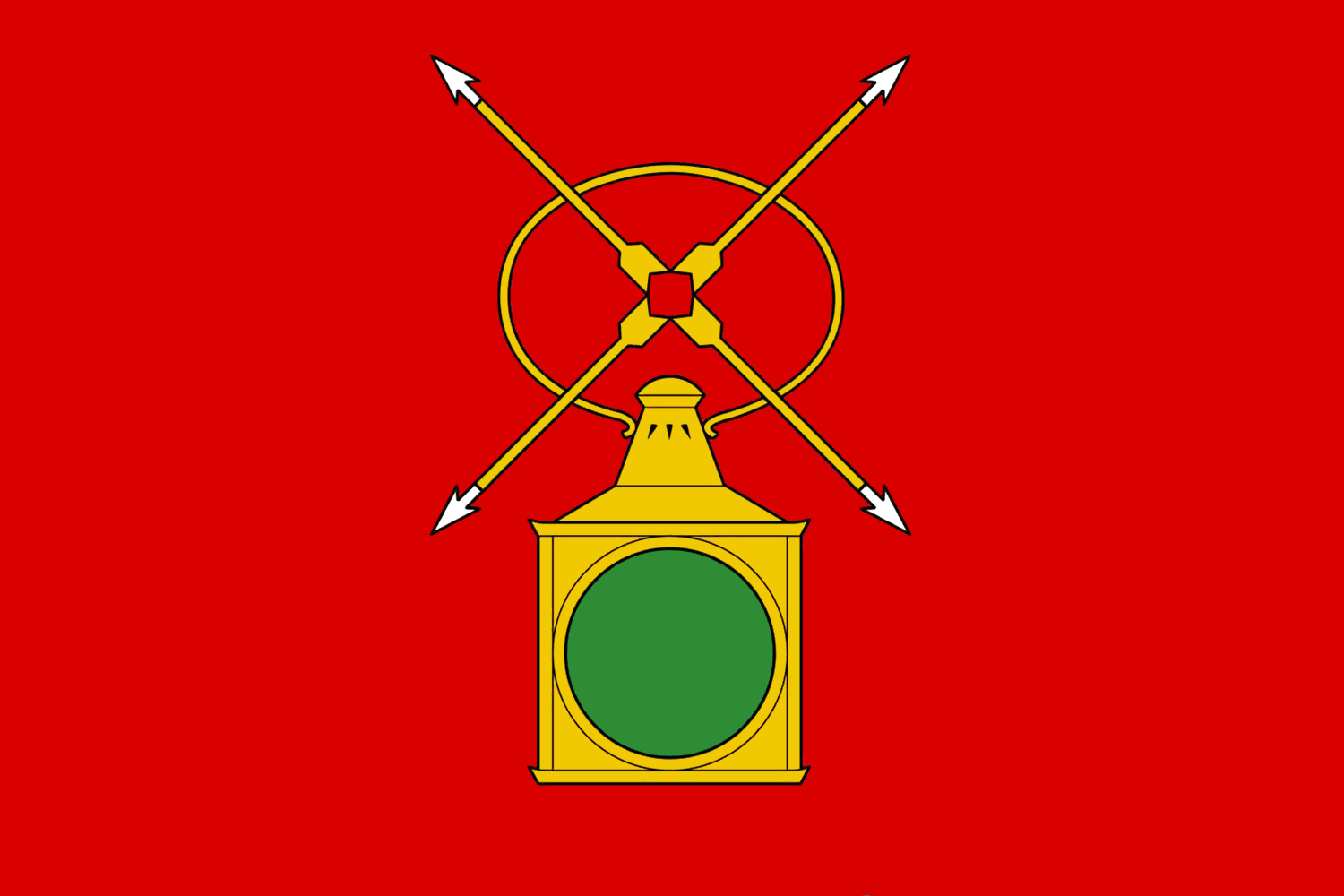
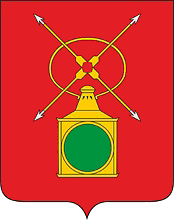
- Flag Coat of arms
- Location of Ruzayevsky District in the Republic of Mordovia
- Coordinates: 54°04′N 44°57′E
- Country: Russia
- Federal subject: Republic of Mordovia
- Established: 16 July 1928
- Administrative center: Ruzayevka

Area
  - Total: 1,089.5 km^{2} (420.7 sq mi)

Population (2010 Census)
  - Total: 18,859
  - Density: 17.310/km^{2} (44.832/sq mi)
  - Urban: 0%
  - Rural: 100%

Administrative structure
  - Administrative divisions: 20 Selsoviets
  - Inhabited localities: 63 rural localities

Municipal structure
  - Municipally incorporated as: Ruzayevsky Municipal District
  - Municipal divisions: 1 urban settlements, 20 rural settlements
- Time zone: UTC+3 (MSK)
- OKTMO ID: 89643000
- Website: http://ruzaevka-rm.ru

Population of Ruzayevsky District
- 2010 Census: 18,859
- 2002 Census: 19,091
- 1989 Census: 21,591
- 1979 Census: 25,754

Ruzayevsky District (Russian: Руза́евский райо́н; Moksha: Орозаень аймак, Orozajeń ajmak; Erzya: Рузайбуе, Ruzajbuje) is an administrative and municipal district (raion), one of the twenty-two in the Republic of Mordovia, Russia. It is located in the southern and central parts of the republic and borders with Staroshaygovsky and Lyambirsky Districts in the north, the territory of the city of republic significance of Saransk and Kochkurovsky District in the east, Penza Oblast in the south, and with Kadoshkinsky and Insarsky Districts in the west. The area of the district is 1,089.5 square kilometers (420.7 sq mi). Its administrative center is the town of Ruzayevka (which is not administratively a part of the district). As of the 2010 Census, the total population of the district was 18,859.

== Administrative and municipal status ==
Within the framework of administrative divisions, Ruzayevsky District is one of the twenty-two in the republic. The district is divided into twenty selsoviets which comprise sixty-three rural localities. The town of Ruzayevka serves as its administrative center, despite being incorporated separately as a town of republic significance—an administrative unit with the status equal to that of the districts.

As a municipal division, the district is incorporated as Ruzayevsky Municipal District, with the town of republic significance of Ruzayevka being incorporated within it as Ruzayevka Urban Settlement. Its twenty selsoviets are incorporated as twenty rural settlements within the municipal district. The town of Ruzayevka serves as the administrative center of the municipal district as well.

== Notable people ==
- Dmitry Balakin, spree killer

== See also ==
- Krasny Ugolok
