= Barysh (river) =

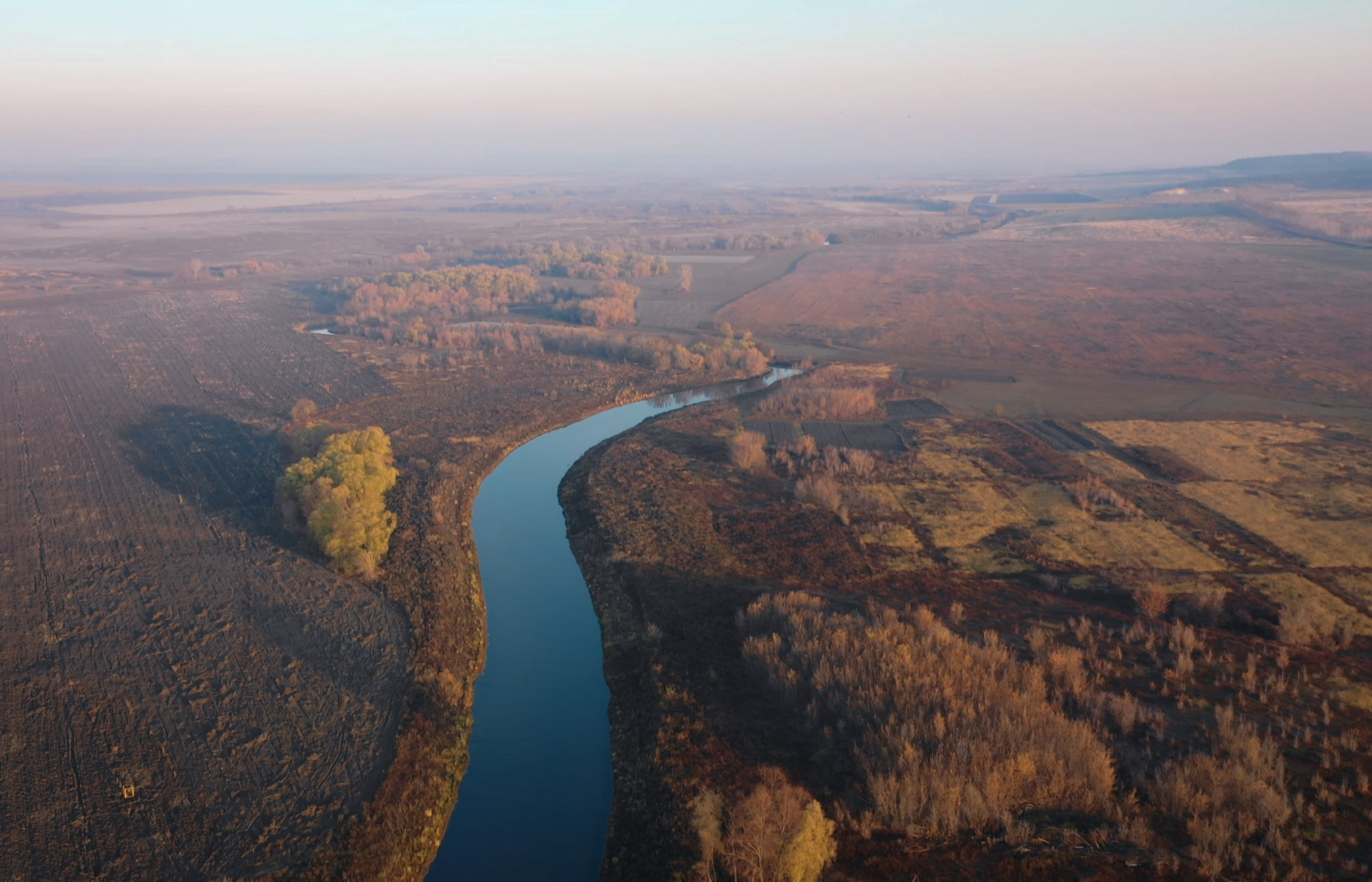
- Native name: Барыш (Russian)

Location
- Country: Russia

Physical characteristics
- Mouth: Sura
  - coordinates: 54°35′39″N 46°48′12″E
- Length: 247 km (153 mi)
- Basin size: 5,800 km^{2} (2,200 sq mi)

Basin features
- Progression: Sura→ Volga→ Caspian Sea

The Barysh (Russian: Бары́ш) is a river in Ulyanovsk Oblast, Russia. It is a right tributary of the Sura (in Volga's drainage basin). It is 247 kilometres (153 mi) long, and has a drainage basin of 5,800 square kilometres (2,200 sq mi). The river flows over the northern parts of the Volga Upland. It is frozen over from November to April. The town of Barysh is situated by the river.
