= Alatyr (river) =

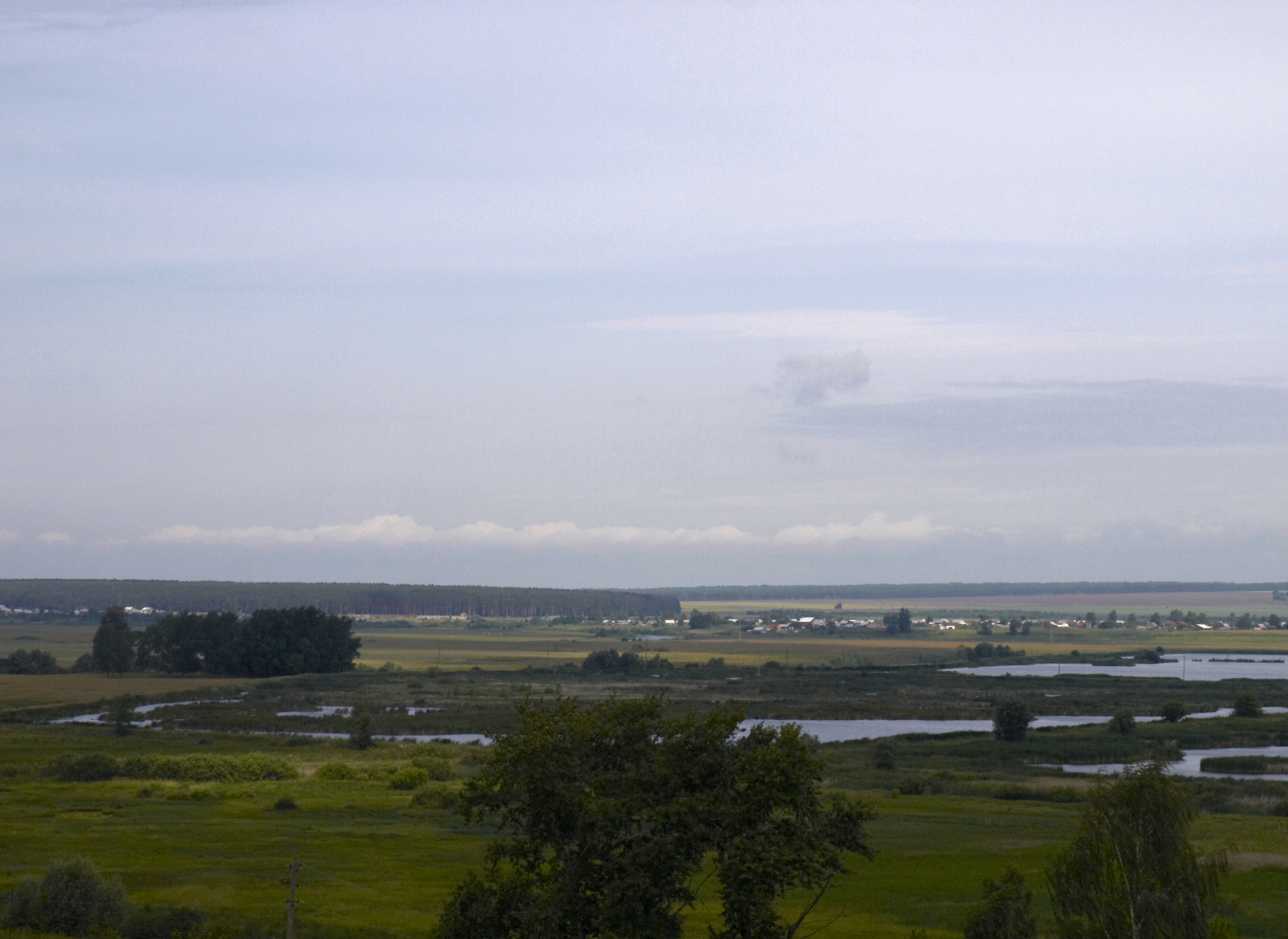
- Alatyr River, view from the railway bridge at Alatyr train station

- Location of mouth
- Native name: Алатырь (Russian)

Location
- Country: Russia

Physical characteristics
- Source
  - coordinates: 54.792°N 45.114°E
- Mouth: Sura
  - coordinates: 54.8694°N 46.5985°E
- Length: 296 km (184 mi)
- Basin size: 11,200 km^{2} (4,300 sq mi)

Basin features
- Progression: Sura→ Volga→ Caspian Sea
- Tributaries
  - right: Insar

The Alatyr (Russian: Алатырь, IPA: [ɐˈɫatɨrʲ]) is a river in Mordovia, Russia, and it is the left tributary of the river Sura. It is 296 kilometres (184 mi) long, and has a drainage basin of 11,200 square kilometres (4,300 sq mi). The Alatyr freezes up in November and stays icebound until April. The towns of Ardatov and Alatyr (Erzya: Ратор, Rator), are located on the Alatyr River.
