= Sura (river) =

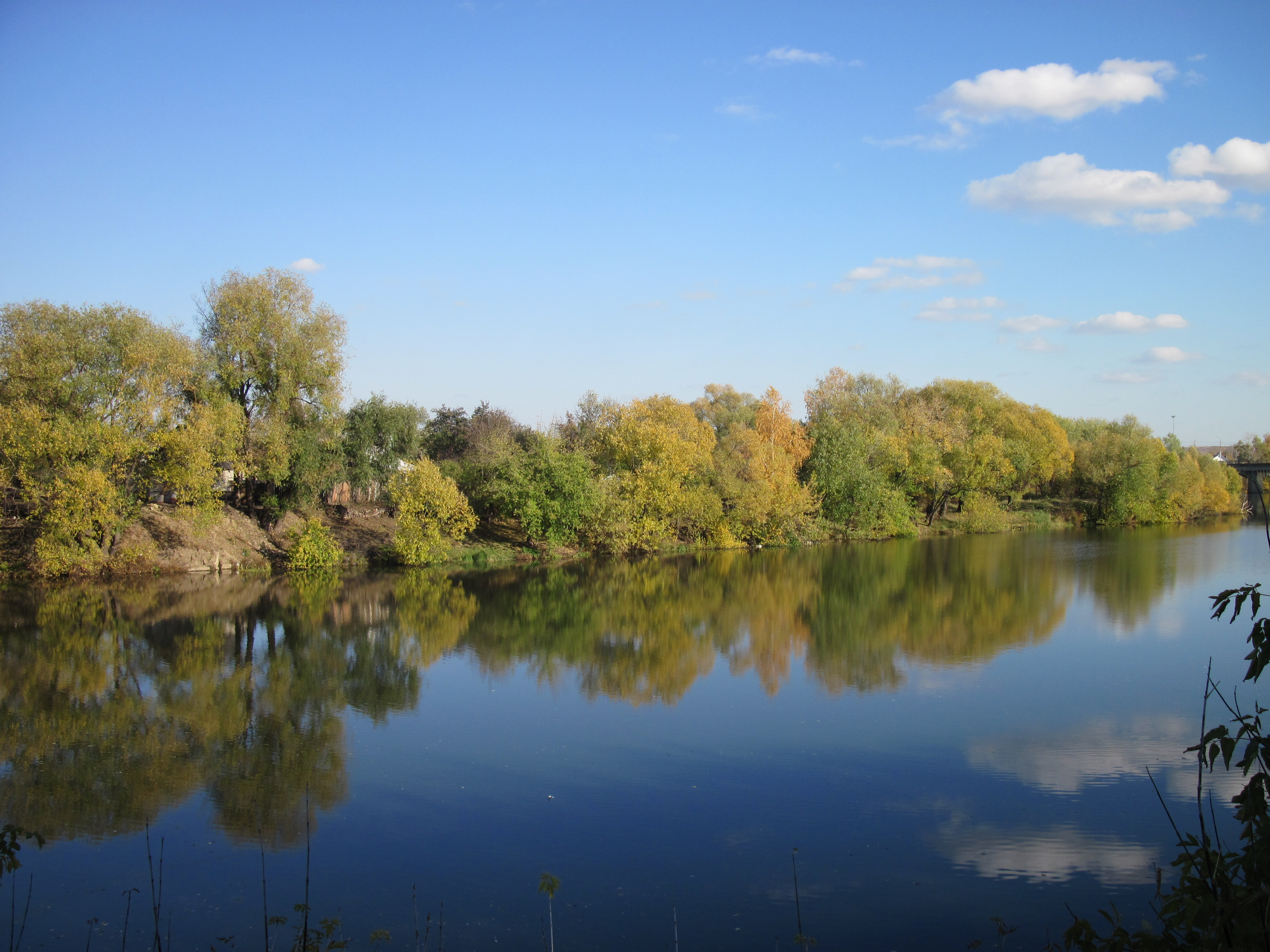
- The Sura in Penza

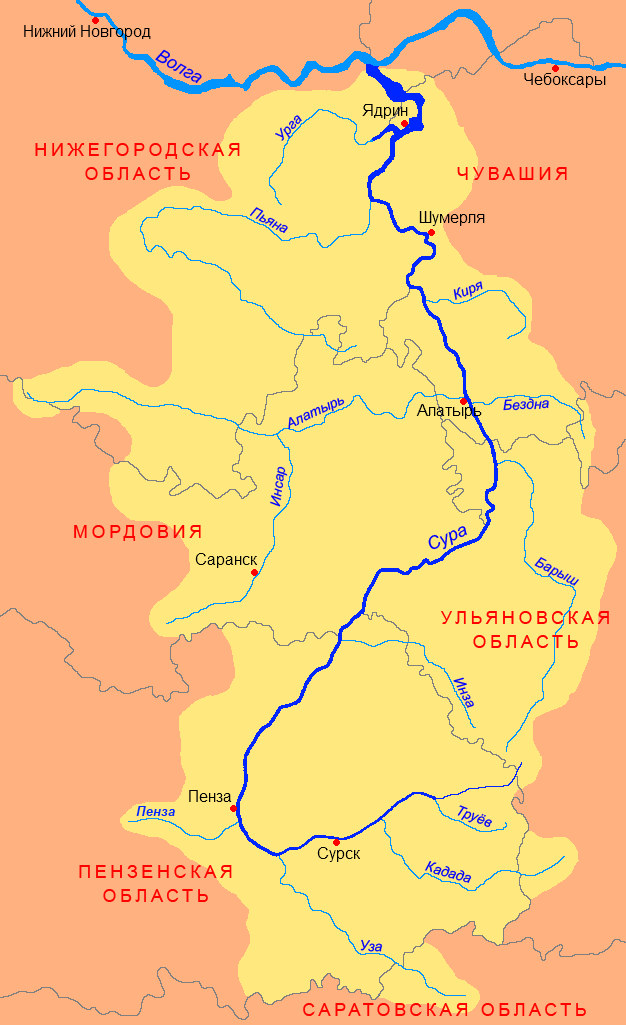
- Map of the Sura River watershed

Location
- Country: Russia

Physical characteristics
- Source
  - elevation: 301 m (988 ft)
- Mouth
  - location: Cheboksary Reservoir
  - coordinates: 56°07′21″N 45°58′16″E
  - elevation: 60 m (200 ft)
- Length: 841 km (523 mi)
- Basin size: 67,500 km^{2} (26,100 sq mi)
- Discharge
  - average: 260 m^{3}/s (9,200 cu ft/s)

Basin features
- Progression: Cheboksary Reservoir→ Volga→ Caspian Sea
- Tributaries
  - left: Kadada, Uza, Alatyr, Pyana
  - right: Inza, Barysh, Bezdna

The Sura (Russian: Сура́, Chuvash: Сăр, Săr) is a river in Russia, a north-flowing right tributary of the Volga. Its mouth on the Volga is about halfway between Nizhny Novgorod and Kazan. It flows through Penza Oblast, Mordovia, Ulyanovsk Oblast, Chuvashia and Nizhny Novgorod Oblast. It is 841 kilometres (523 mi) long, and has a drainage basin of 67,500 square kilometres (26,100 sq mi). It is navigable for 394 km from the mouth.

The city of Penza, and smaller towns Alatyr, Shumerlya, Yadrin lie along the Sura. At the confluence with the Volga lies the settlement of Vasilsursk.

The principal tributaries of the Sura are the Penza, the Pyana, and the Alatyr.

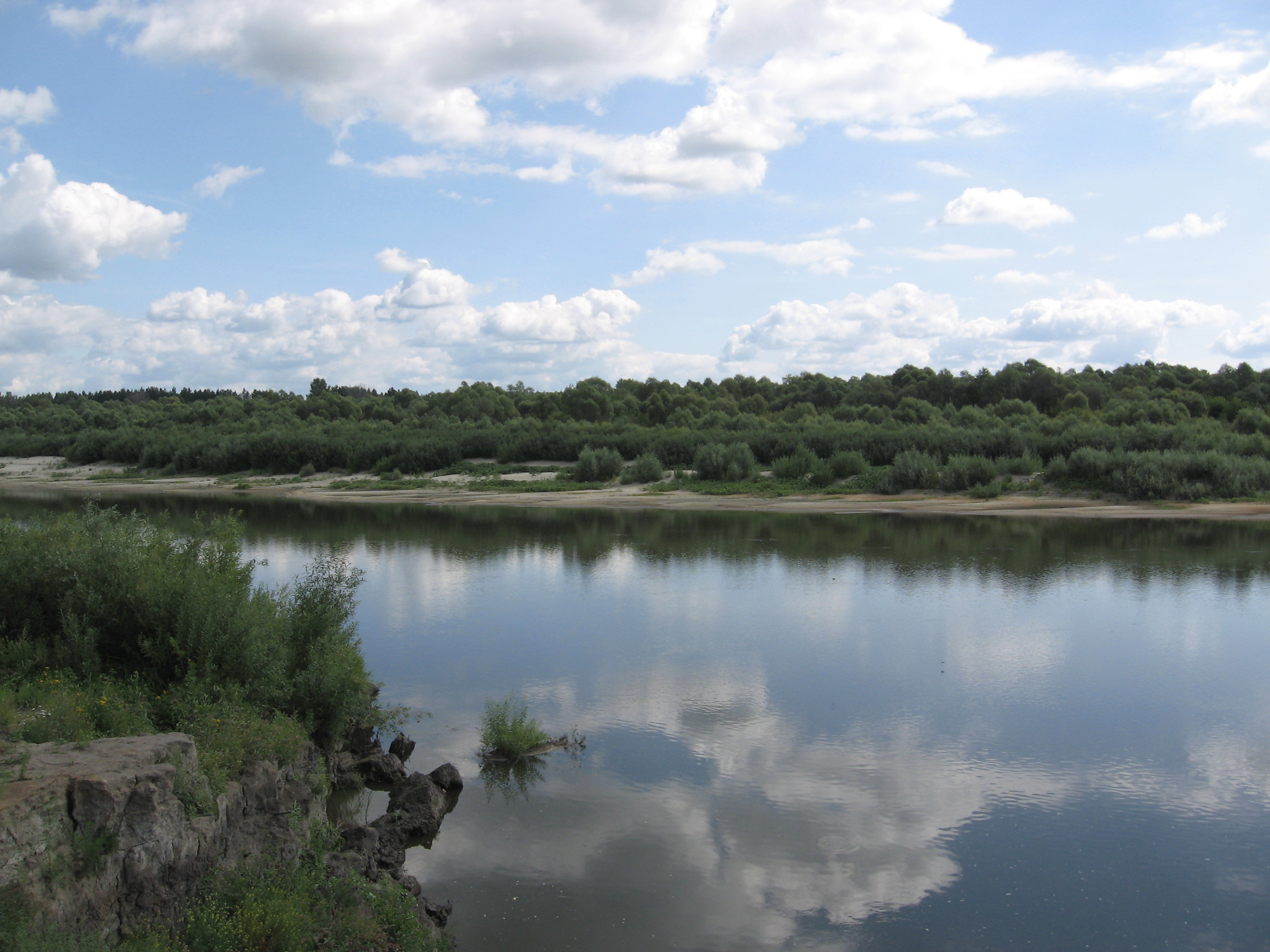
The Sura River near Alatyr.
