= Ruzayevka =

Town in the Republic of Mordovia, Russia

Ruzayevka Рузаевка Оразай ош (Erzya)
- Town

Other transcription(s)
  - Moksha: Орозай
  - Erzya: Оразай ош
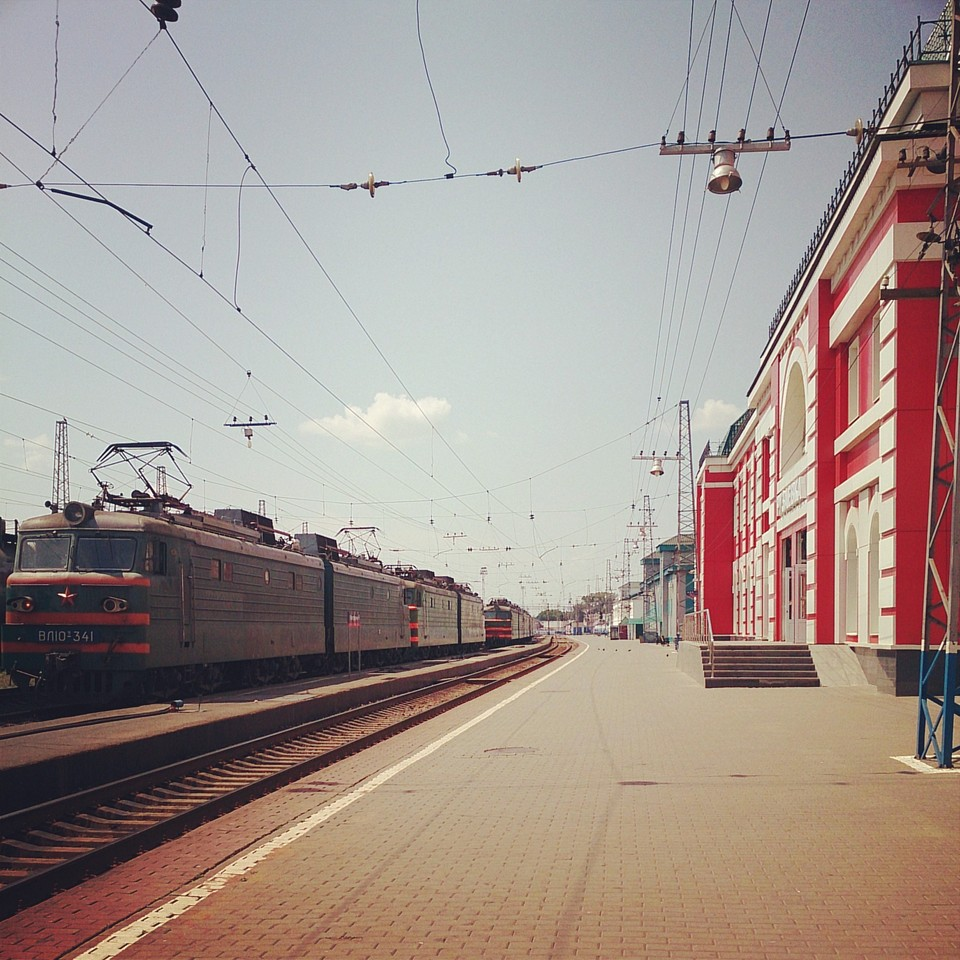
- Ruzayevka railway station, July 2013

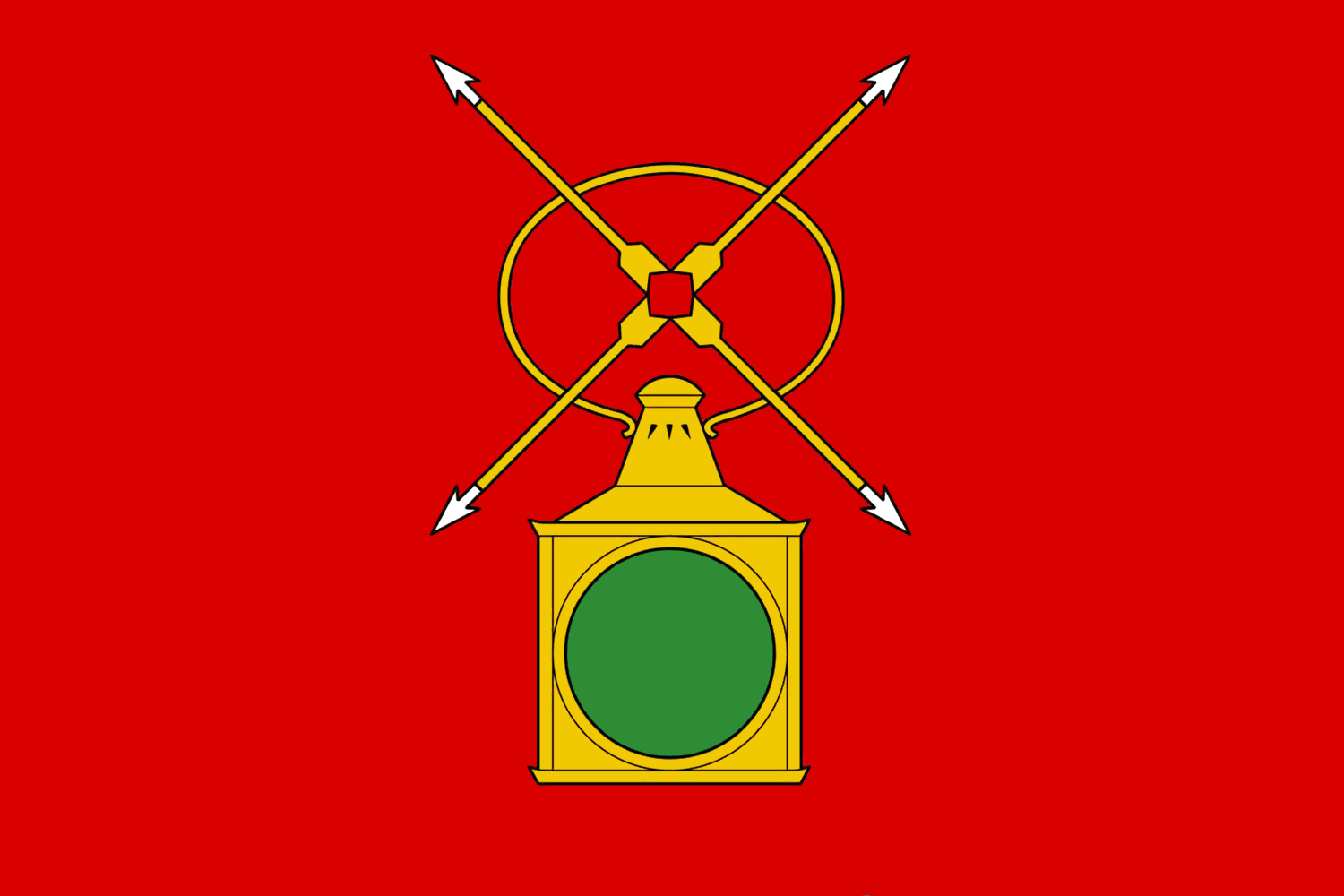
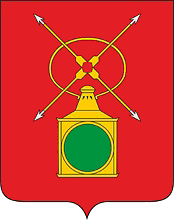
- Flag Coat of arms
- Interactive map of Ruzayevka
- Location of Ruzayevka Ruzayevka (Republic of Mordovia)
- Coordinates: 54°04′N 44°56′E
- Country: Russia
- Federal subject: Mordovia
- Founded: 1631
- Town status since: 1937
- Elevation: 220 m (720 ft)

Population (2010 Census)
  - Total: 47,523
  - Estimate (2025): 41,660 (−12.3%)

Administrative status
  - Subordinated to: town of republic significance of Ruzayevka
  - Capital of: Ruzaevsky District, town of republic significance of Ruzayevka

Municipal status
  - Municipal district: Ruzaevsky Municipal District
  - Urban settlement: Ruzayevka Urban Settlement
  - Capital of: Ruzaevsky Municipal District, Ruzayevka Urban Settlement
- Time zone: UTC+3 (MSK)
- Postal code: 431440
- Dialing code: +7 83451
- OKTMO ID: 89643101001

Ruzayevka (Russian: Руза́евка; Moksha: Орозай, Orozaj; Erzya: Оразай ош, Orazaj oš) is a town in the Republic of Mordovia, Russia, located on the Insar River, 25 kilometers (16 mi) southwest of Saransk. Population: 47,523 (2010 census); 49,790 (2002 census); 51,034 (1989 Soviet census).

== History ==
The town was founded on the land given to murza Uraza Tankacheev in 1631 by Russian tsar Michael Fedorovich and is believed to be named after him. The Tatar princes and murzas were owners of Ruzayevka up to 1715. In 1725, the land and peasants were given to the Lieutenant Tikhon Lukin, who owned it for more than 30 years, and then went bankrupt and in 1757 sold it to the court Councilor Yeremey Struysky. For more than a hundred years (1757–1861) Ruzayevka belonged to landowners from the Struysky noble family.

During the 1905 Russian revolution, it became one of the centers of the revolutionary movement, supporting the uprising of Moscow workers. On 23 December [O.S. 10 December] 1905, a committee headed by the engineer of the locomotive depot Afanasiy Petrovich Baykuzov took power in the town and cut off the Moscow–Kazan railway line, proclaiming the "Ruzayevka Republic".

The railway station of Ruzayevka is mentioned in the poetry of the Latvian author Aleksandrs Čaks (Mūžības skartie "Touched by eternity"). The poetry is about Latvian military riflemen in return from the Russian Civil War in 1920.

== Administrative and municipal status ==
Within the framework of administrative divisions, Ruzayevka serves as the administrative center of Ruzaevsky District, even though it is not a part of it. As an administrative division, it is incorporated separately as the town of republic significance of Ruzayevka—an administrative unit with the status equal to that of the districts. As a municipal division, the town of republic significance of Ruzayevka is incorporated within Ruzayevsky Municipal District as Ruzayevka Urban Settlement.

== Economy ==
Ruzayevka is the second biggest industrial center of the republic after Saransk. Primary branches of the industry are mechanical engineering (Ruzkhimmash), vacuum tube mechanical engineering, instrumentation, food processing, and railway transportation.

=== Transportation ===
The town is a large railway hub of the Kuybyshev Railway.

== Infrastructure ==
There are several museums in Ruzayevka:

- Regional museum
- Railway museum
- A branch of the Mordovian art museum

In 1952, a railway club (a cultural center adjacent to the station) was built in the Stalin's Empire style. The club was named after Alexey Ukhtomskiy, a revolutionary who took part in the 1905 uprising.

== Notable people ==
- Alexandra Nikolaevna Kulikova, Moksha singer-songwriter
- Lyubov Denisova, actress
- Vladimir Ivanovich Sidorin, puppet theater director
- Anatoliy Batenkov, trumpeter and conductor.

== Education ==
There are nine secondary schools, five children's schools of arts, an orphanage, five vocational schools, and Ruzaevsky Institute of Mechanical Engineering of Mordovian State University in Ruzayevka.

== Health care ==
There are several hospitals in Ruzayevka, including Ruzaevsky Central Regional Hospital and Ruzayevka's Railway Central Hospital.
