= Lyambir (air base) =

Lyambir Air Base
- IATA: none; ICAO: XWPS

Summary
- Airport type: DOSAAF
- Operator: unknown
- Elevation AMSL: 653 ft / 199 m
- Coordinates: 53°17′10″N 45°10′01″E
- Interactive map of Lyambir Air Base

Runways
Direction	Length		Surface
Direction	ft	m	Surface
		300

Lyambir (Russian: Лямбирь) is an training airfield, located 12 kilometers (7.5 mi) north of Saransk. It is a not big airfield with parallel taxiway and tarmac space. During the Soviet period it was a DOSAAF training airfield. Google Earth the airfield is empty, except for a few old, small single-engine propeller aircraft.
