= Saransk =

City in Mordovia, Russia

Saransk Саранск
- City

Other transcription(s)
  - Moksha: Саранск ошсь
  - Erzya: Саран
- St. Theodore Ushakov Cathedral House of Trade Unions Mordovia Arena Mordovian State Russian Drama Theatre Kommunisticheskaya Street

- Flag Coat of arms
- Interactive map of Saransk
- Location of Saransk Saransk (European Russia) Saransk (Europe)
- Coordinates: 54°11′N 45°11′E
- Country: Russia
- Federal subject: Mordovia
- Founded: 1641
- City status since: 1780

Government
  - Body: Council of Deputies
  - Mayor: Pyotr Tultayev

Area
  - Total: 383 km^{2} (148 sq mi)
- Elevation: 160 m (520 ft)

Population (2010 Census)
  - Total: 297,415
  - Estimate (2025): 309,349 (+4%)
  - Rank: 64th in 2010
  - Density: 777/km^{2} (2,010/sq mi)

Administrative status
  - Subordinated to: city of republic significance of Saransk
  - Capital of: Republic of Mordovia
  - Capital of: city of republic significance of Saransk

Municipal status
  - Urban okrug: Saransk Urban Okrug
  - Capital of: Saransk Urban Okrug
- Time zone: UTC+3 (MSK)
- Postal codes: 430000–430013, 430015–430019, 430021, 430023–430025, 430027, 430028, 430030–430034, 430700, 430899, 430950, 995300
- Dialing code: +7 8342
- OKTMO ID: 89701000001
- City Day: June 12
- Website: www.adm-saransk.ru

Saransk (UK: /səˈrænsk/, US: /sɑːˈrɑːnsk/) (Note: Russian: Саранск, IPA: [sɐˈransk]; Moksha: Саранск ошсь, romanized: Saransk oš; Erzya: Саран ош, romanized: Saran oš) is the capital city of Mordovia, Russia, as well as its financial and economic centre. It is located in the Volga basin at the confluence of the Saranka and Insar Rivers, about 630 kilometers (390 mi) east of Moscow. Saransk was one of the host cities of the official tournament of the 2018 FIFA World Cup.

== History ==
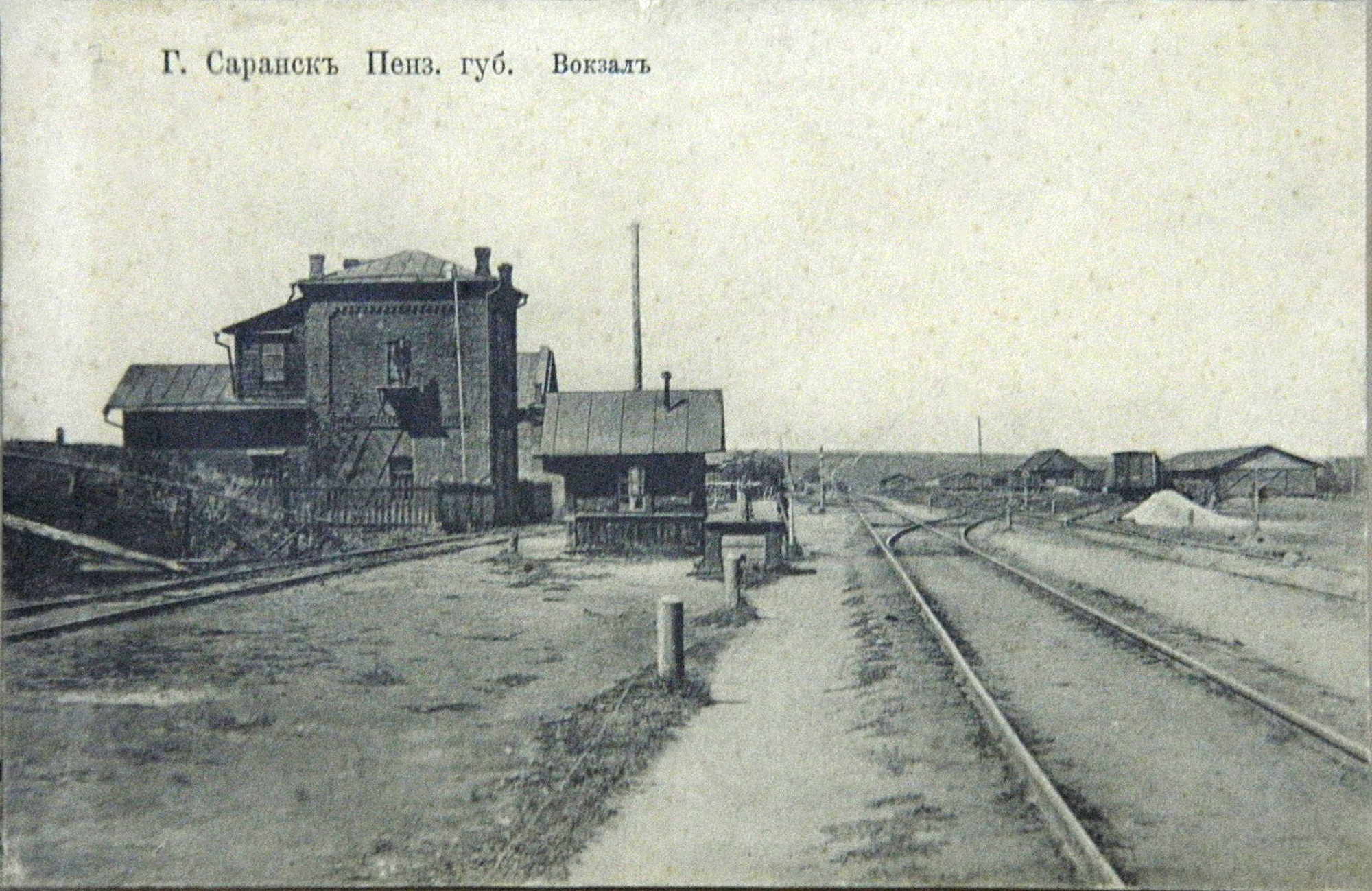
The first station, built in 1893

The Russian fortress Atemar, founded in 1641, took its name from a nearby Mordvin village; at the time the fortress stood on the southeastern frontier of the Tsardom of Russia. The current name, "Saransk", refers to the city's situation on the Saranka river. Soon after its founding, the city became an important trade centre for nearby Erzya villagers. After 1708 Saransk was assigned to Azov Province, and later to the Kazan Governorate. In 1780 the settlement was granted town status and was again transferred, this time to the Penza Governorate, which was previously called the Penza Namestnichestvo, but was renamed to Penza Governorate by Paul I in 1796. On 11 October 1797, the Penza Governorate was divided into several governorates, one of which was the Simbirsk Governorate, which was composed of the Saransk and Insar uezds. By the ukaz of Alexander I, the Penza Governorate was re-established and now was divided into 10 uezds.

In 1928 Saransk was the administrative centre of the newly established Mordvin National Okrug, which became the Mordovian Autonomous Oblast in 1930. In 1941 Saransk was near the front line in the Battle of Moscow, but was never reached by the Wehrmacht. Soviet planners reconstructed the old city centre in the 1960s and 1970s, adding wide streets and planning the construction of massive residential areas.

In 2016 a monument was erected to those shot in the prisons of Saransk during the Great Terror.

== Administrative and municipal status ==
Saransk is the capital of the Mordovian republic. Within the framework of administrative divisions, it is, together with three work settlements (Lukhovka, Nikolayevka, and Yalga) and thirteen rural localities, incorporated as the city of republic significance of Saransk—an administrative unit with the status equal to that of the districts. As a municipal division, the city of republic significance of Saransk is incorporated as Saransk Urban Okrug.

== Geography ==
The city is located in the Volga basin at the confluence of the Saranka and Insar Rivers, about 630 kilometers (390 mi) east of Moscow.

=== Urban layout ===
The central district of Saransk, the place of the key sightseeing attractions, is a square limited by the streets Staroposadskaya, Botevgradskaya, Polezhaeva/Vasenko, Serova, and Alexandra Nevskogo. Volgogradskaya Street connects the city center with the eastern part of the city, starting from the intersection of Kommunisticheskaya and Serova Streets and crossing the Insar River. Mordovia Arena is located immediately across the river. The route Veselovskogo Street – Kovalenko Street – Yugo-Zapadnoye Highway runs north to south through the western districts of the city (from Lyambirskoye Highway to Osipenko Street). Lenina Avenue connects the city center with the northern part of Saransk, first changing into Alexandrovskoye, and then to Lyambirskoye Highway. Intersecting them, Severny Bypass runs around Saransk in the north, starting at the intersection of P-180 and P-158 highways. It then changes into Vostochny Bypass that connects Saransk to the airport. Osipenko Street runs from the center to the southern boundary of Saransk. The route connecting the city to the airport follows Alexandra Nevskogo Street – Sevastopolskaya Street – Krasnaya Street through the exit after the junction with Vostochny Bypass. Street parking in Saransk is free of charge. Parking on sidewalks, public transport stops, and at special traffic signs is prohibited.

=== Climate ===
Saransk has a relatively chilly version of the humid continental climate (Köppen: Dfb) with warm but not hot summers and cold winters, that averages well below freezing for five months of the year. Transition periods are extremely short and only April and October are between 0 °C (32 °F) and 10 °C (50 °F) in mean temperatures.

Climate data for Saransk
Month	Jan	Feb	Mar	Apr	May	Jun	Jul	Aug	Sep	Oct	Nov	Dec	Year
Record high °C (°F)	4.8 (40.6)	14.0 (57.2)	16.3 (61.3)	28.9 (84.0)	34.0 (93.2)	36.1 (97.0)	38.0 (100.4)	39.4 (102.9)	32.3 (90.1)	23.0 (73.4)	13.9 (57.0)	7.1 (44.8)	39.4 (102.9)
Mean daily maximum °C (°F)	−6.7 (19.9)	−4.9 (23.2)	0.4 (32.7)	11.7 (53.1)	21.4 (70.5)	23.6 (74.5)	25.9 (78.6)	24.7 (76.5)	17.8 (64.0)	9.3 (48.7)	1.0 (33.8)	−3.5 (25.7)	10.0 (50.0)
Daily mean °C (°F)	−9.6 (14.7)	−8.2 (17.2)	−3.4 (25.9)	6.1 (43.0)	15.0 (59.0)	17.7 (63.9)	19.9 (67.8)	18.4 (65.1)	12.4 (54.3)	5.4 (41.7)	−1.7 (28.9)	−5.9 (21.4)	5.5 (41.9)
Mean daily minimum °C (°F)	−12.4 (9.7)	−11.2 (11.8)	−6.8 (19.8)	1.4 (34.5)	9.1 (48.4)	12.0 (53.6)	14.2 (57.6)	13.0 (55.4)	7.9 (46.2)	2.4 (36.3)	−4.0 (24.8)	−8.3 (17.1)	1.5 (34.7)
Record low °C (°F)	−44.0 (−47.2)	−39.7 (−39.5)	−31.5 (−24.7)	−17.6 (0.3)	−6.0 (21.2)	−2.4 (27.7)	4.9 (40.8)	0.0 (32.0)	−5.0 (23.0)	−14.6 (5.7)	−29.5 (−21.1)	−36.0 (−32.8)	−44.0 (−47.2)
Average precipitation mm (inches)	34 (1.3)	29 (1.1)	27 (1.1)	36 (1.4)	34 (1.3)	47 (1.9)	52 (2.0)	57 (2.2)	42 (1.7)	42 (1.7)	30 (1.2)	40 (1.6)	471 (18.5)
Average precipitation days (≥ 0.1 mm)	15.0	12.2	13.0	11.3	12.8	16.5	15.7	13.5	11.9	12.7	12.7	14.9	162.2

== Industry ==
Industrial activity in Saransk includes the production of electrical cables, chemical production, textile manufacturing, food processing, machine building, and metallurgy. The city has two thermal power stations. The city has the confectionery plant Lamzur.

The most notable industrial enterprises include the Lisma Electrical Factory which employs nearly 12,000 people; the Biokhimik pharmaceutical facility; Rezinotekhnika, a rubber products manufacturer; cable manufacturer Saranskkabel; and Elektrovypryamitel, which manufactures electronic components and, on a small scale, television sets.

== Demographics ==
Historical population
Year	Pop.	±%
1897	15,000	—
1926	15,000	+0.0%
1939	41,146	+174.3%
1959	91,034	+121.2%
1970	190,575	+109.3%
1979	263,337	+38.2%
1989	312,128	+18.5%
2002	304,866	−2.3%
2010	297,415	−2.4%
2021	314,871	+5.9%
Source: Census data

Saransk is by far the largest city in Mordovia and accounts for 34.3% of the total population of the republic (as of the 2002 Census). Ethnic Russians form the majority of the population (about 85%), and Russian, rather than any of the two co-official Mordvinic languages, is the common language of communication in the city. As with many provincial capitals in Russia, the population of Saransk decreased after the dissolution of the Soviet Union, primarily as a result of economic migration to larger cities, made especially attractive by the downsizing, or outright collapse, of many smaller, regional, industrial enterprises. The population started to grow again in 2009. Population: 297,415 (2010 census); 304,866 (2002 census); 312,128 (1989 Soviet census).

== Culture and religion ==
The Saransk Regional Museum is dedicated primarily to the history of the city, while the Mordovian Museum of Visual Arts has a collection of works by the Russian masters Stepan Erzia and Fedot Sychkov.

The city is home to the Mordovian State University (founded in 1957) as well as several technical colleges.

Saransk has three Orthodox churches and also a small Lutheran church (Finnish Lutheran Church), which was opened in 2005. There are also three mosques. The main cathedral in Saransk is the Cathedral of St. Theodore Ushakov, the construction of which was completed in 2006.

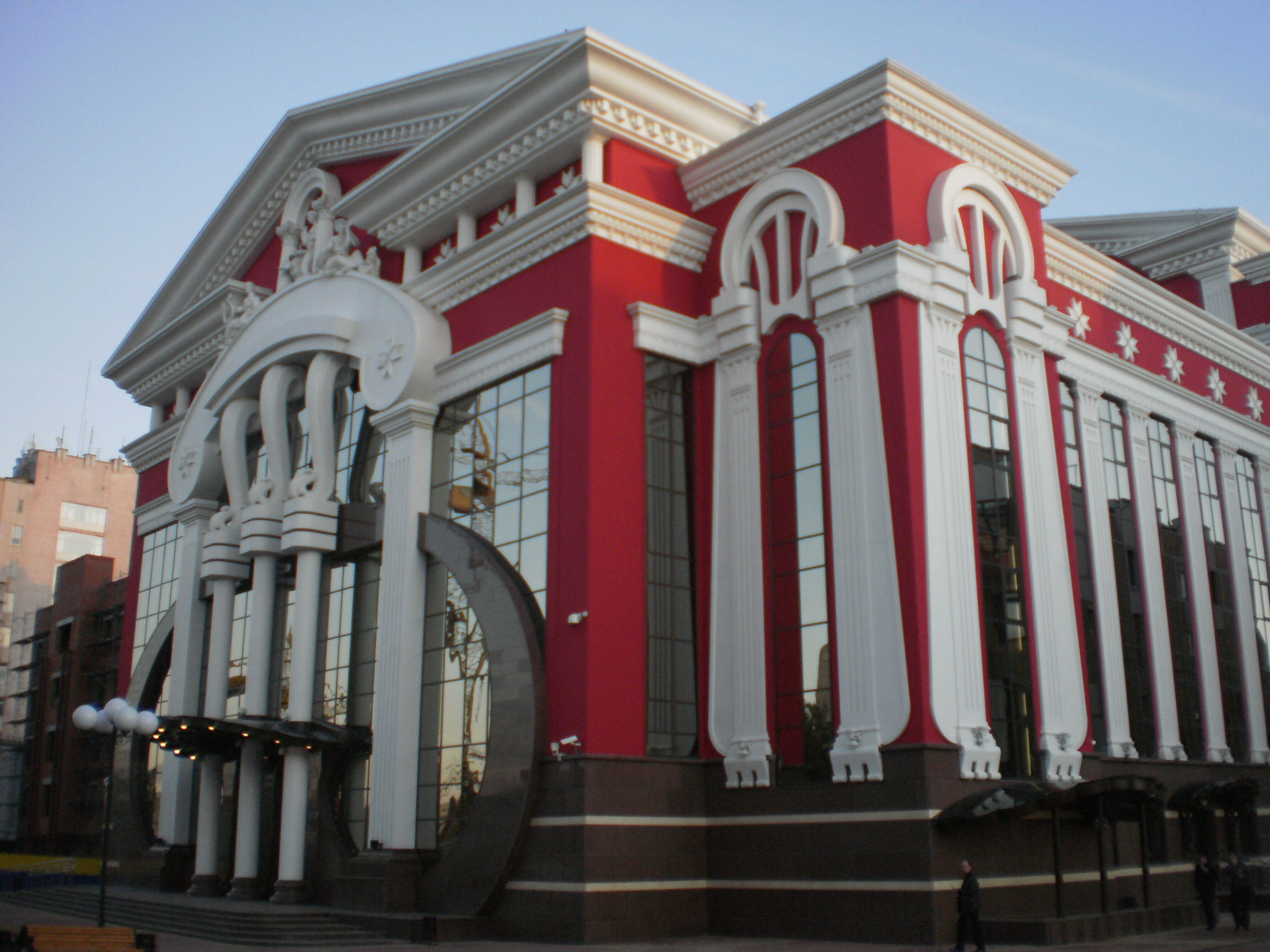
Musical theatre named after I. M. Yaushev

Mordovia Yaushev State Music Theater in Saransk, the capital of Mordovia. It was founded in 1932 by Moscow Academy of Maly Theatre . Initially the theatre performed Russian classics, translated into the Mordovian languages, but later they began to adapt the drama works of national authors for the stage.

Saransk has several theatres, including:

- The State Russian Drama Theatre, opened on 25 August 1932 and initially called the Mordovian National Theatre
- The Opera and Ballet Theater, opened on 9 September 2011
- The State Puppet Theater of the Republic of Mordovia
- The Mordovia National Drama Theatre, opened in 1932 by the Moscow Academy of Maly Theatre

== Sport ==
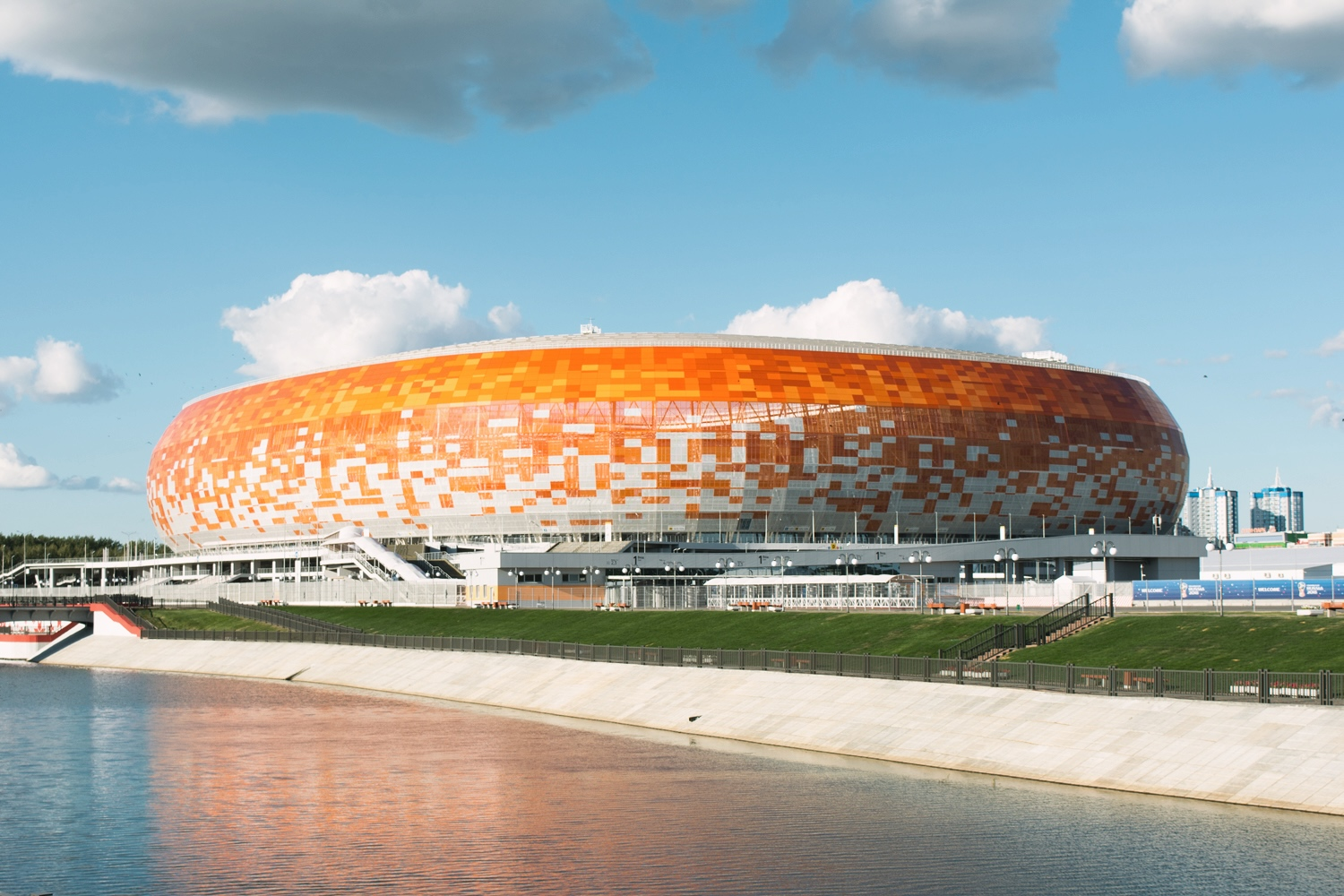
The Mordovia Arena hosted 2018 FIFA World Cup games

Saransk is a major sports center of the Volga region. The city has several large sports facilities, such as the Republican Palace of Sports, Ice Palace, Mordovia Sports Complex, Leonid Arkaev Gymnastics Center, various sports and fitness clubs and gyms. The city territory accommodates two large stadiums: Start and Mordovia Arena.

Mordovia has extensive experience as a host to federal and international sporting events. In 2012, Saransk hosted the IAAF World Race Walking Cup, while the city's FC Mordovia Saransk played three seasons in the Russian Premier League against the country's leading football clubs.

In 2016, Mordovia was named the most athletic region in the country. The number of locals engaged in regular sports activities is growing and is as of today at 36%. There are over 2100 sports facilities in Saransk. Those include:

- Mordovia Arena stadium. A stadium that hosted the group matches of the 2018 FIFA World Cup
- Athletics Sports School for Olympic Reserve
- Mordovia Sports Complex
- Ice Palace of the Republic of Mordovia
- Palace of Sports
- Ogarev Arena
- Olimp Sports Complex
- Formula S Sports and Entertainment Complex
- Mordovia Tennis Center
- Skiing and Biathlon Complex of the Republic of Mordovia
- Start Stadium
- Palace of Water Sports
- Saransk Stadium

From 16 to 28 June 2018, Saransk hosted the 2018 FIFA World Cup. Mordovia Arena hosted four group stage matches.

== Cityscape and architecture ==
The city has a large number of buildings remaining from the 17th and 18th centuries; however, many parts of the town are dominated by Soviet era apartment blocks, dating mainly from the 1960s, similar to other provincial towns which expanded rapidly due to fast industrialization. These buildings are nearing the end of their service life and are in need of serious repair and, in many cases, replacement. Industrial enterprises are mainly located to the north of the town center. The eastern part of Saransk, located east of the Insar River, is Posop. An interesting detail is the Soviet era military base, belonging to the Russian Ministry of Internal Affairs, which is located along the railway lines and serves of a time when Saransk was, effectively, a closed city. Another city landmark is the Saransk TV Tower – a 180-meter-tall guyed tubular steel mast built in 1961.

The city has been going through modernization process since 2018. Historic buildings have been restored. Roads have been paved along with many other improvements and upgrades.

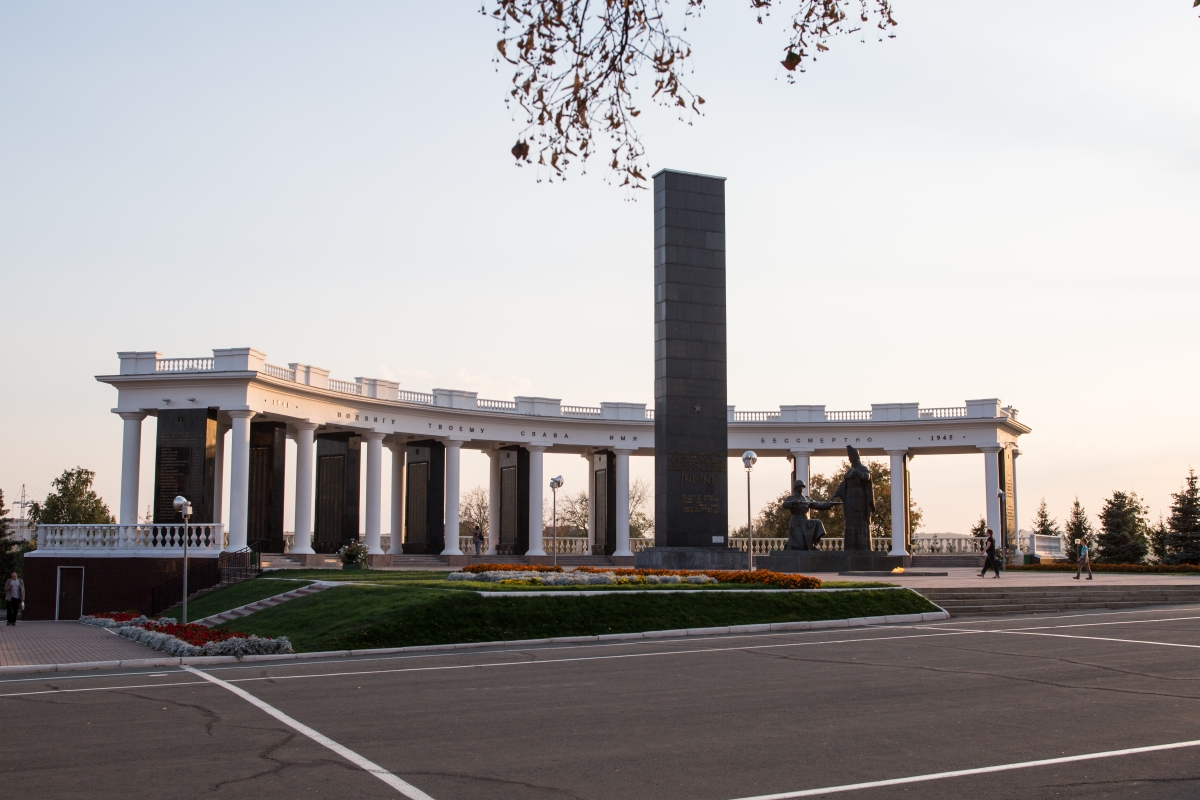
Monument of Eternal Glory in memory of fallen soldiers

As in any other city, Saransk has many monuments. These are some of them:

- Monument to Sts. Cyril and Methodius
- Monument to Patriarch Nikon
- Monument to Pugachev
- The Monument of Eternal glory
- Monument to Pushkin
- Monument to Polezhaev
- Monument to Heroes-stratonauts
- Monument of The Plane
- Family Monument

The Family Monument is one of the most noteworthy monuments in Saransk. It lies in the center of the city, near the Cathedral of St. Feodor Ushakov, at the crossroads of Sovietskaya and the Democraticheskaya streets. It was opened in 2008, which was declared the Year of Family in Russia. The author of the monument is sculptor Nikolai Filatov. This monument is a symbol of absolute family values, the true foundation of society. The sculpture depicts a life-size large family; the husband with a little child on his shoulders, his pregnant wife, the mother of the children and two more children, holding on to their parents.

== Transportation ==
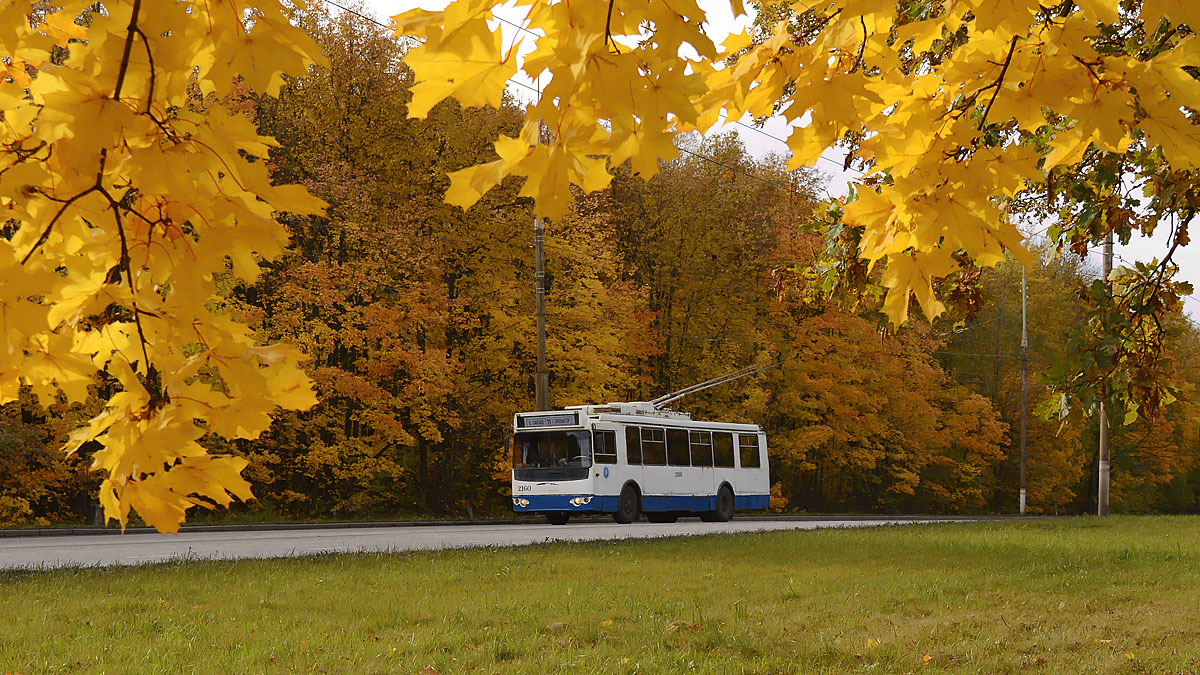
Trolleybus on Pobedy Street in Saransk

The municipal transit system of Saransk consists primarily of a network of bus and trolleybus lines.

Saransk I railway station is a station on the Kuybyshev Railway. The city has additional stations serving regional railways to Ruzayevka and Krasny Uzel. Formerly, Saransk was also served by two daily Penza–Nizhny Novgorod passenger trains, carrying passengers from nearby villages mainly to either Ruzayevka junction station and Penza or to Arzamas and Nizhny Novgorod.

There is a daily direct train service with Moscow.

The city is served by the small Saransk Airport (IATA: SKX, ICAO: UWPS) southeast of downtown. It is served primarily by small regional carriers; the most common aircraft is the An-24. There are scheduled flights to and from Moscow's Domodedovo airport on weekdays. Saransk is also home to the Lyambir airforce base.

=== Airport ===
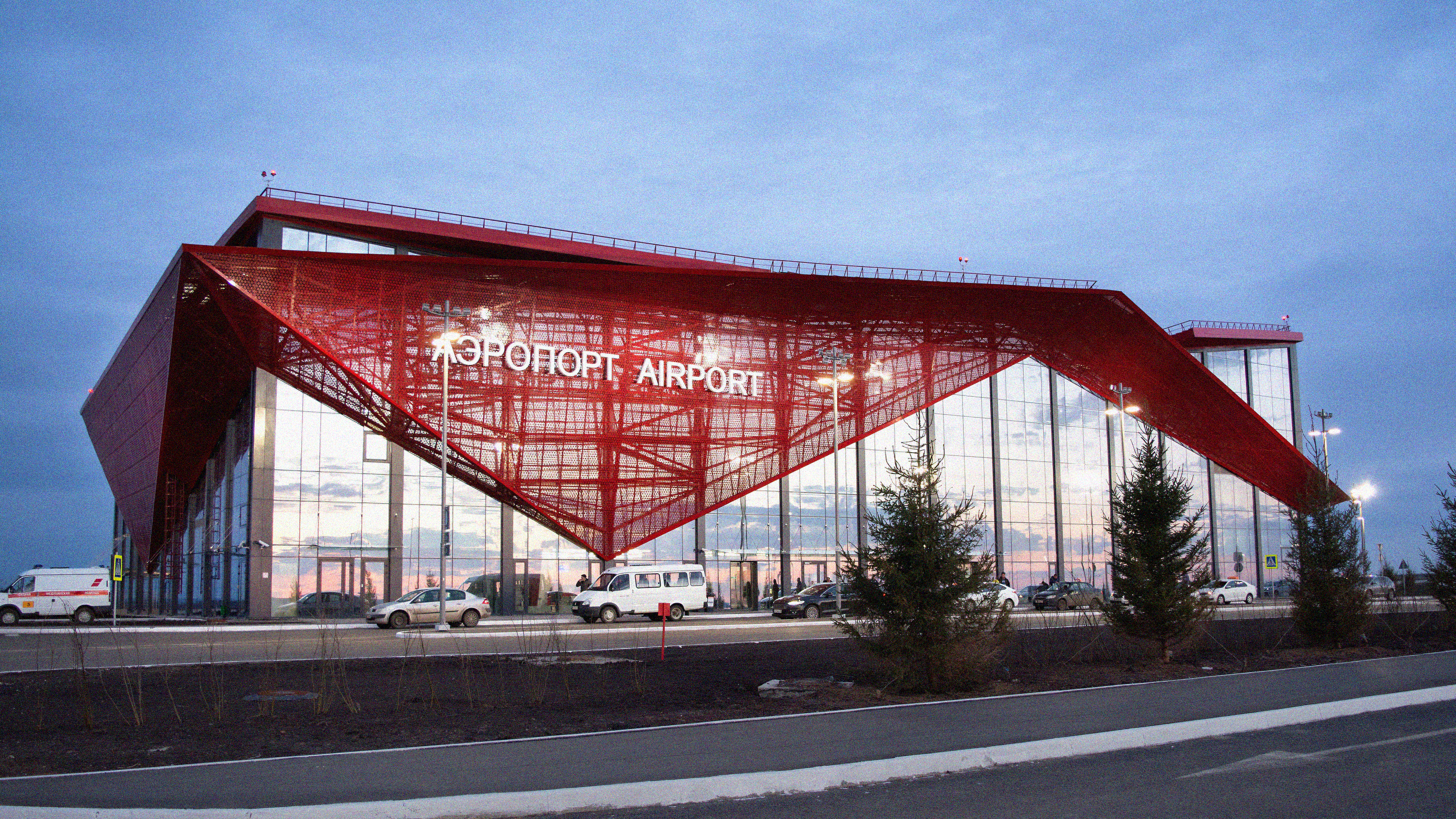
Saransk Airport

Saransk is serviced by one international federal airport, the Saransk Airport (IATA: SKX, ICAO: UWPS). In January 2017, the airport was closed for renovation until the end of the year, as Saransk was chosen to serve as a host city to matches of the 2018 FIFA World Cup. After the renovation, the Airport's runway has been reinforced with asphalt concrete. The airport was expanded with a new permanent terminal with a passenger capacity of 300 people per hour for domestic flights (600 people per hour during the 2018 FIFA World Cup) and a temporary terminal for international flights with a passenger capacity of 360 people per hour. The airport has been cleared to service Boeing 737 CL\NG and Airbus A-319\320\321. In 2018, the airport received its first scheduled flight after the renovation. The international terminal of the Saransk Airport can be reached by car, public transport, or taxi.

==== Bus service ====
The airport is linked to the city center by bus No.29. Time of departure from the airport: 07.50; 09.30; 11.20; 12.50; 17.45; 19.45; 23.10. During the game days of the FIFA World Cup, public transportation services for fans will be free of charge. Official shuttles will be running the route from the airport to the Fan Fest venue (Ice Palace).

==== Private vehicles ====
The new terminal has two parking lots. Subject to space availability, a free parking area can be used.

=== City transport ===
The city of Saransk is serviced by trolleybuses, buses and taxi buses. Trolleybus transportation has existed in the city since 1966 and provides a reliable link to all districts of Saransk. In preparation of the city to the FIFA World Cup, Saransk has upgraded its park of municipal buses and trolleybuses. Taxi buses are operated by private transportation service providers using Russia-made PAZ and GAZ and foreign-made buses. Waiting intervals for some bus routes is 2–3 minutes (during rush hours).

=== Automobile transport ===
In preparation for the FIFA World Cup, Saransk has been linked to the airport by a new road; the construction of a new road junction providing access to the airport is currently in progress. The length of the new road to the airport is 3.5 km. The road was partially reconstructed and partially built anew. The total length of the road around Saransk is 17.5 km. The road has two lanes and includes three road junctions, five bridges and four overpasses. The road was built to reduce the traffic in the city center and link the federal highway to regional roads.

== Education ==
Kiryukov Music College is located in Saransk.

== International relations ==
Saransk is twinned with:

- Botevgrad, Bulgaria
- Gorzów Wielkopolski, Poland
- Sieradz, Poland
- Kalinkavichy, Belarus

== Notable people ==
- Aleksei Artyomov (born 1983), retired football player
- Mikhail Bakhtin (1895–1975), philosopher, lived and taught in Saransk between 1949 and 1969. A monument to Bakhtin was unveiled in 2015 in the city.
- Gérard Depardieu (born 1948), actor, registered as a resident of Saransk since February 2013
- Mikhail Fedak (born 2001), football player
- Dmitri Samarkin (born 1980), former footballer
- Artem Surkov (born 1993), wrestler
- Mike Varshavski (born 1989), Russian-American doctor and YouTube personality
