= Administrative divisions of Penza Oblast =

Administrative districts of Russian federal subject

Penza Oblast Russia
- Administrative center: Penza

Administrative structure (as of 2013)
- Districts: 27
- Cities/towns: 11
- Urban-type settlements: 16
- Selsovets: 271

Municipal structure (as of 2002)
- Rural settlements: 1,490 (inhabited); 46 (uninhabited)

Penza Oblast is a federal subject of Russia.

== Administrative and municipal divisions ==
Map

Division		Structure		OKATO	OKTMO	Urban-type settlement/ district-level town*	Rural (selsovet)
Division		Administrative	Municipal	OKATO	OKTMO	Urban-type settlement/ district-level town*	Rural (selsovet)
Zarechny (Заречный)		city (ZATO)	urban okrug	56 534	56 734		
Penza (Пенза)		city	urban okrug	56 401	56 701		
↳	Leninsky (Ленинский)	(under Penza)	—N/a	56 401	—N/a		
↳	Oktyabrsky (Октябрьский)	(under Penza)	—N/a	56 401	—N/a		
↳	Pervomaysky (Первомайский)	(under Penza)	—N/a	56 401	—N/a		
↳	Zheleznodorozhny (Железнодорожный)	(under Penza)	—N/a	56 401	—N/a		
Kuznetsk (Кузнецк)		city	urban okrug	56 405	56 705		
Bashmakovsky (Башмаковский)		district		56 203	56 603	Bashmakovo (Башмаково)	13
Spassky (Спасский)		district		56 206	56 606	Spassk (Спасск) town*	9
Bekovsky (Бековский)		district		56 209	56 609	Bekovo (Беково)	8
Belinsky (Белинский)		district		56 212	56 612	Belinsky (Белинский) town*	10
Bessonovsky (Бессоновский)		district		56 213	56 613		10
Vadinsky (Вадинский)		district		56 215	56 615		7
Gorodishchensky (Городищенский)		district		56 218	56 618	Gorodishche (Городище) town*; Sursk (Сурск) town*; Chaadayevka (Чаадаевка)	12
Zemetchinsky (Земетчинский)		district		56 223	56 623	Zemetchino (Земетчино)	10
Issinsky (Иссинский)		district		56 226	56 626	Issa (Исса)	5
Kamensky (Каменский)		district		56 229	56 629	Kamenka (Каменка) town*	11
Kameshkirsky (Камешкирский)		district		56 231	56 631		6
Kolyshleysky (Колышлейский)		district		56 233	56 633	Kolyshley (Колышлей)	8
Kuznetsky (Кузнецкий)		district		56 240	56 640	Verkhozim (Верхозим); Yevlashevo (Евлашево)	11
Lopatinsky (Лопатинский)		district		56 242	56 642		11
Luninsky (Лунинский)		district		56 243	56 643	Lunino (Лунино)	9
Maloserdobinsky (Малосердобинский)		district		56 244	56 644		6
Mokshansky (Мокшанский)		district		56 245	56 645	Mokshan (Мокшан)	12
Narovchatsky (Наровчатский)		district		56 247	56 647		13
Neverkinsky (Неверкинский)		district		56 249	56 649		15
Nizhnelomovsky (Нижнеломовский)		district		56 251	56 651	Nizhny Lomov (Нижний Ломов) town*	10
Nikolsky (Никольский)		district		56 253	56 653	Nikolsk (Никольск) town*; Sura (Сура)	10
Pachelmsky (Пачелмский)		district		56 254	56 654	Pachelma (Пачелма)	7
Penzensky (Пензенский)		district		56 255	56 655	Zolotaryovka (Золотарёвка)	17
Serdobsky (Сердобский)		district		56 256	56 656	Serdobsk (Сердобск) town*	11
Sosnovoborsky (Сосновоборский)		district		56 257	56 647	Sosnovoborsk (Сосновоборск)	13
Tamalinsky (Тамалинский)		district		56 258	56 658	Tamala (Тамала)	5
Shemysheysky (Шемышейский)		district		56 259	56 659	Shemysheyka (Шемышейка)	12
