= Yagodny =

Yagodny (Russian: Я́годный; masculine), Yagodnaya (Я́годная; feminine), or Yagodnoye (Я́годное; neuter) is the name of several inhabited localities in Russia.

== Altai Krai ==
As of 2022, two rural localities in Altai Krai bear this name:

- Yagodny, Altai Krai, a settlement in Pervomaysky Selsoviet of Biysky District
- Yagodnoye, Altai Krai, a settlement in Tsentralnaya Settlement Administration of Barnaul

== Amur Oblast ==
As of 2022, one rural locality in Amur Oblast bears this name:

- Yagodny, Amur Oblast, a railway block post under the administrative jurisdiction of Yerofey Pavlovich Urban Settlement of Skovorodinsky District

== Republic of Bashkortostan ==
As of 2022, one rural locality in the Republic of Bashkortostan bears this name:

- Yagodnaya, Republic of Bashkortostan, a village in Iglinsky Selsoviet of Iglinsky District

== Bryansk Oblast ==
As of 2022, two rural localities in Bryansk Oblast bear this name:

- Yagodnoye, Klimovsky District, Bryansk Oblast, a village in Churovichsky Selsoviet of Klimovsky District
- Yagodnoye, Novozybkovsky District, Bryansk Oblast, a settlement in Starorudnyansky Selsoviet of Novozybkovsky District

== Republic of Buryatia ==
As of 2022, one rural locality in the Republic of Buryatia bears this name:

- Yagodnoye, Republic of Buryatia, a selo in Zagustaysky somon of Selenginsky District

== Chelyabinsk Oblast ==
As of 2022, two rural localities in Chelyabinsk Oblast bear this name:

- Yagodny, Chelyabinsk Oblast, a settlement in Nizhnesanarsky Selsoviet of Troitsky District
- Yagodnaya, Chelyabinsk Oblast, a village in Nagaybaksky Selsoviet of Nagaybaksky District

== Irkutsk Oblast ==
As of 2022, one rural locality in Irkutsk Oblast bears this name:

- Yagodny, Irkutsk Oblast, a settlement in Shelekhovsky District

== Kaliningrad Oblast ==
As of 2022, five rural localities in Kaliningrad Oblast bear this name:

- Yagodnoye, Gvardeysky District, Kaliningrad Oblast, a settlement in Znamensky Rural Okrug of Gvardeysky District
- Yagodnoye, Nesterovsky District, Kaliningrad Oblast, a settlement in Prigorodny Rural Okrug of Nesterovsky District
- Yagodnoye, Polessky District, Kaliningrad Oblast, a settlement in Zalesovsky Rural Okrug of Polessky District
- Yagodnoye, Pravdinsky District, Kaliningrad Oblast, a settlement in Domnovsky Rural Okrug of Pravdinsky District
- Yagodnoye, Zelenogradsky District, Kaliningrad Oblast, a settlement in Krasnotorovsky Rural Okrug of Zelenogradsky District

== Kaluga Oblast ==
As of 2022, one rural locality in Kaluga Oblast bears this name:

- Yagodnoye, Kaluga Oblast, a village in Ulyanovsky District

== Khabarovsk Krai ==
As of 2022, one rural locality in Khabarovsk Krai bears this name:

- Yagodny, Khabarovsk Krai, a settlement in Komsomolsky District

== Khanty-Mansi Autonomous Okrug ==
As of 2022, one rural locality in Khanty-Mansi Autonomous Okrug bears this name:

- Yagodny, Khanty-Mansi Autonomous Okrug, a settlement in Kondinsky District

== Krasnodar Krai ==
As of 2022, one rural locality in Krasnodar Krai bears this name:

- Yagodnoye, Krasnodar Krai, a selo in Olginsky Rural Okrug of Primorsko-Akhtarsky District

== Krasnoyarsk Krai ==
As of 2022, one rural locality in Krasnoyarsk Krai bears this name:

- Yagodny, Krasnoyarsk Krai, a settlement in Kamensky Selsoviet of Mansky District

== Kurgan Oblast ==
As of 2022, two rural localities in Kurgan Oblast bear this name:

- Yagodnoye, Kurgan Oblast, a selo in Yagodninsky Selsoviet of Almenevsky District
- Yagodnaya, Kurgan Oblast, a village in Yagodninsky Selsoviet of Belozersky District

== Leningrad Oblast ==
As of 2022, one rural locality in Leningrad Oblast bears this name:

- Yagodnoye, Leningrad Oblast, a village in Petrovskoye Settlement Municipal Formation of Priozersky District

== Lipetsk Oblast ==
As of 2022, one rural locality in Lipetsk Oblast bears this name:

- Yagodnoye, Lipetsk Oblast, a selo in Yagodnovsky Selsoviet of Dankovsky District

== Magadan Oblast ==
As of 2022, one urban locality in Magadan Oblast bears this name:

- Yagodnoye, Magadan Oblast, an urban-type settlement in Yagodninsky District

== Nizhny Novgorod Oblast ==
As of 2022, seven rural localities in Nizhny Novgorod Oblast bear this name:

- Yagodny, Nizhny Novgorod Oblast, a settlement in Pelya-Khovansky Selsoviet of Pochinkovsky District
- Yagodnoye, Bogorodsky District, Nizhny Novgorod Oblast, a village in Khvoshchevsky Selsoviet of Bogorodsky District
- Yagodnoye, Nikolo-Pogostinsky Selsoviet, Gorodetsky District, Nizhny Novgorod Oblast, a village in Nikolo-Pogostinsky Selsoviet of Gorodetsky District
- Yagodnoye, Smolkovsky Selsoviet, Gorodetsky District, Nizhny Novgorod Oblast, a village in Smolkovsky Selsoviet of Gorodetsky District
- Yagodnoye, Perevozsky District, Nizhny Novgorod Oblast, a selo in Tilininsky Selsoviet of Perevozsky District
- Yagodnoye, Pilninsky District, Nizhny Novgorod Oblast, a village in Bortsurmansky Selsoviet of Pilninsky District
- Yagodnaya, Nizhny Novgorod Oblast, a village in Solomatovsky Selsoviet of Chkalovsky District

== Novosibirsk Oblast ==
As of 2022, one rural locality in Novosibirsk Oblast bears this name:

- Yagodny, Novosibirsk Oblast, a settlement in Karasuksky District

== Omsk Oblast ==
As of 2022, one rural locality in Omsk Oblast bears this name:

- Yagodnoye, Omsk Oblast, a village in Azovsky Rural Okrug of Azovsky Nemetsky National District

== Orenburg Oblast ==
As of 2022, two rural localities in Orenburg Oblast bear this name:

- Yagodny, Orenburg Oblast, a settlement in Pokrovsky Selsoviet of Novosergiyevsky District
- Yagodnoye, Orenburg Oblast, a selo in Yagodinsky Selsoviet of Grachyovsky District

== Oryol Oblast ==
As of 2022, one rural locality in Oryol Oblast bears this name:

- Yagodnoye, Oryol Oblast, a village in Krutovsky Selsoviet of Kolpnyansky District

== Penza Oblast ==
As of 2022, two rural localities in Penza Oblast bear this name:

- Yagodny, Kolyshleysky District, Penza Oblast, a settlement under the administrative jurisdiction of the work settlement of Kolyshley, Kolyshleysky District
- Yagodny, Luninsky District, Penza Oblast, a settlement in Lomovsky Selsoviet of Luninsky District

== Ryazan Oblast ==
As of 2022, one rural locality in Ryazan Oblast bears this name:

- Yagodnoye, Ryazan Oblast, a selo in Yagodnovsky Rural Okrug of Sarayevsky District

== Samara Oblast ==
As of 2022, two rural localities in Samara Oblast bear this name:

- Yagodny, Samara Oblast, a settlement in Koshkinsky District
- Yagodnoye, Samara Oblast, a selo in Stavropolsky District

== Sverdlovsk Oblast ==
As of 2022, one rural locality in Sverdlovsk Oblast bears this name:

- Yagodny, Sverdlovsk Oblast, a settlement under the administrative jurisdiction of the City of Yekaterinburg

== Tomsk Oblast ==
As of 2022, three rural localities in Tomsk Oblast bear this name:

- Yagodnoye, Asinovsky District, Tomsk Oblast, a selo in Asinovsky District
- Yagodnoye, Tomsky District, Tomsk Oblast, a settlement in Tomsky District
- Yagodnoye, Verkhneketsky District, Tomsk Oblast, a settlement in Verkhneketsky District

== Tula Oblast ==
As of 2022, one rural locality in Tula Oblast bears this name:

- Yagodnoye, Tula Oblast, a village in Kostomarovskaya Rural Administration of Shchyokinsky District

== Vladimir Oblast ==
As of 2022, one rural locality in Vladimir Oblast bears this name:

- Yagodnoye, Vladimir Oblast, a village in Sobinsky District

== Volgograd Oblast ==
As of 2022, three rural localities in Volgograd Oblast bear this name:

- Yagodny, Rudnyansky District, Volgograd Oblast, a khutor in Osichkovsky Selsoviet of Rudnyansky District
- Yagodny, Serafimovichsky District, Volgograd Oblast, a khutor in Krutovsky Selsoviet of Serafimovichsky District
- Yagodnoye, Volgograd Oblast, a selo in Yagodnovsky Selsoviet of Olkhovsky District

== Vologda Oblast ==
As of 2022, one rural locality in Vologda Oblast bears this name:

- Yagodnaya, Vologda Oblast, a village in Ivanovsky Selsoviet of Cherepovetsky District

== Zabaykalsky Krai ==
As of 2022, one rural locality in Zabaykalsky Krai bears this name:

- Yagodny, Zabaykalsky Krai, a settlement in Chitinsky District
