= Ulyanovka =

Ulyanovka (Russian: Ульяновка) is the name of several inhabited localities in Russia.

Urban localities

- Ulyanovka, Leningrad Oblast, an urban-type settlement under the administrative jurisdiction of Ulyanovskoye Settlement Municipal Formation in Tosnensky District of Leningrad Oblast

Rural localities

- Ulyanovka, Karmaskalinsky District, Republic of Bashkortostan, a village in Nikolayevsky Selsoviet of Karmaskalinsky District of the Republic of Bashkortostan
- Ulyanovka, Kuyurgazinsky District, Republic of Bashkortostan, a village in Taymasovsky Selsoviet of Kuyurgazinsky District of the Republic of Bashkortostan
- Ulyanovka, Belgorod Oblast, a khutor in Golofeyevsky Rural Okrug of Volokonovsky District of Belgorod Oblast
- Ulyanovka, Chuvash Republic, a settlement in Bakhtigildinskoye Rural Settlement of Batyrevsky District of the Chuvash Republic
- Ulyanovka, Kaliningrad Oblast, a settlement under the administrative jurisdiction of the town of oblast significance of Ladushkin, Kaliningrad Oblast
- Ulyanovka, Kursk Oblast, a village in Olkhovsky Selsoviet of Khomutovsky District of Kursk Oblast
- Ulyanovka, Lipetsk Oblast, a village in Lebyazhensky Selsoviet of Izmalkovsky District of Lipetsk Oblast
- Ulyanovka, Ardatovsky District, Republic of Mordovia, a village in Silinsky Selsoviet of Ardatovsky District of the Republic of Mordovia
- Ulyanovka, Atyashevsky District, Republic of Mordovia, a settlement in Sabancheyevsky Selsoviet of Atyashevsky District of the Republic of Mordovia
- Ulyanovka, Moscow Oblast, a village in Provodnikovskoye Rural Settlement of Kolomensky District of Moscow Oblast
- Ulyanovka, Nizhny Novgorod Oblast, a village in Deyanovsky Selsoviet of Pilninsky District of Nizhny Novgorod Oblast
- Ulyanovka, Novosibirsk Oblast, a selo in Krasnozyorsky District of Novosibirsk Oblast
- Ulyanovka, Omsk Oblast, a selo in Bogoslovsky Rural Okrug of Omsky District of Omsk Oblast
- Ulyanovka, Korsakovsky District, Oryol Oblast, a village in Maryinsky Selsoviet of Korsakovsky District of Oryol Oblast
- Ulyanovka, Kromskoy District, Oryol Oblast, a village in Shakhovsky Selsoviet of Kromskoy District of Oryol Oblast
- Ulyanovka, Belinsky District, Penza Oblast, a village in Pushaninsky Selsoviet of Belinsky District of Penza Oblast
- Ulyanovka, Kuznetsky District, Penza Oblast, a selo under the administrative jurisdiction of the work settlement of Yevlashevo in Kuznetsky District of Penza Oblast
- Ulyanovka, Tamalinsky District, Penza Oblast, a selo in Ulyanovsky Selsoviet of Tamalinsky District of Penza Oblast
- Ulyanovka, Perm Krai, a village in Chernushinsky District of Perm Krai
- Ulyanovka, Ryazan Oblast, a village in Mushkovatovsky Rural Okrug of Ryazansky District of Ryazan Oblast
- Ulyanovka, Samara Oblast, a settlement in Koshkinsky District of Samara Oblast
- Ulyanovka, Georgiyevsky District, Stavropol Krai, a settlement in Ulyanovsky Selsoviet of Georgiyevsky District of Stavropol Krai
- Ulyanovka, Mineralovodsky District, Stavropol Krai, a selo in Ulyanovsky Selsoviet of Mineralovodsky District of Stavropol Krai
- Ulyanovka, Kirsanovsky District, Tambov Oblast, a selo in Sokolovsky Selsoviet of Kirsanovsky District of Tambov Oblast
- Ulyanovka, Uvarovsky District, Tambov Oblast, a village in Moiseyevo-Alabushsky Selsoviet of Uvarovsky District of Tambov Oblast
- Ulyanovka, Republic of Tatarstan, a selo in Cheremshansky District of the Republic of Tatarstan
- Ulyanovka, Kamensky District, Tula Oblast, a village in Galitsky Rural Okrug of Kamensky District of Tula Oblast
- Ulyanovka, Leninsky District, Tula Oblast, a village in Rozhdestvensky Rural Okrug of Leninsky District of Tula Oblast
- Ulyanovka, Venyovsky District, Tula Oblast, a village in Metrostroyevsky Rural Okrug of Venyovsky District of Tula Oblast
- Ulyanovka, Tver Oblast, a village in Palchikhinskoye Rural Settlement of Maksatikhinsky District of Tver Oblast
- Ulyanovka, Tyumen Oblast, a village in Pervovagaysky Rural Okrug of Vagaysky District of Tyumen Oblast
- Ulyanovka, Ulyanovsk Oblast, a village under the administrative jurisdiction of Leninsky Settlement Okrug in Baryshsky District of Ulyanovsk Oblast
- Ulyanovka, Vologda Oblast, a village in Pertsevsky Selsoviet of Gryazovetsky District of Vologda Oblast
- Ulyanovka, Borisoglebsky Urban Okrug, Voronezh Oblast, a selo under the administrative jurisdiction of Borisoglebsky Urban Okrug in Voronezh Oblast
- Ulyanovka, Repyovsky District, Voronezh Oblast, a khutor in Skoritskoye Rural Settlement of Repyovsky District of Voronezh Oblast
- Ulyanovka, Zabaykalsky Krai, a selo in Shilkinsky District of Zabaykalsky Krai
