= Lermontovsky constituency =

Lermontovsky single-member constituency
- Constituency of the Russian State Duma

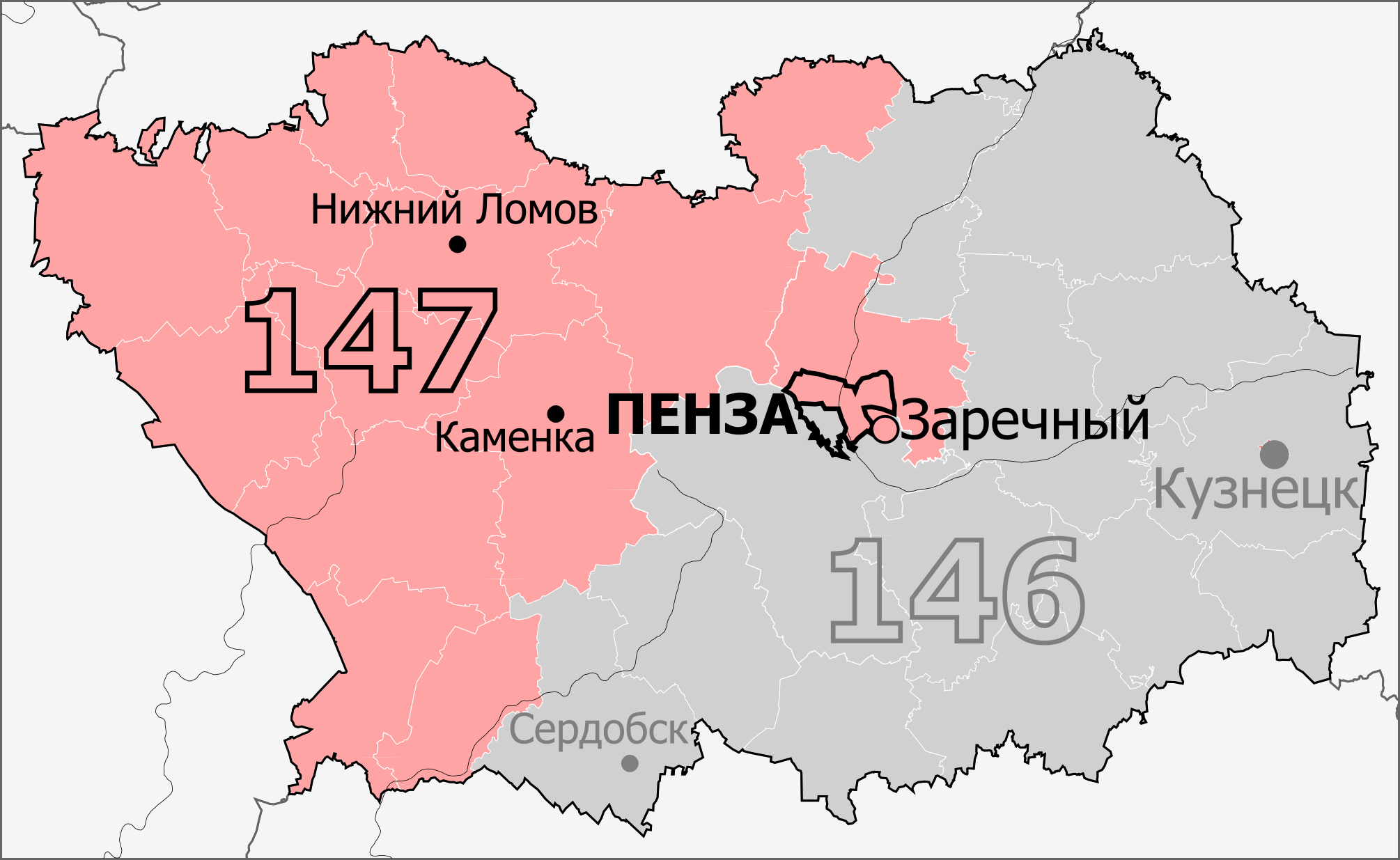
- Deputy: Igor Rudensky; United Russia
- Federal subject: Penza Oblast
- Districts: Bashmakovsky, Bekovsky, Belinsky, Bessonovsky, Issinsky, Kamensky, Mokshansky, Narovchatsky, Nizhnelomovsky, Pachelmsky, Penza (Oktyabrsky, Zheleznodorozhny), Spassky, Tamalinsky, Vadinsky, Zarechny, Zemetchinsky
- Voters: 499,003 (2026)

The Lermontovsky constituency (No.149 (Note: Zheleznodorozhny constituency No.135 in 1993-2007, No.147 in 2016–2026)) is a Russian legislative constituency in Penza Oblast. The constituency covers north-eastern half of Penza as well as western and northern Penza Oblast.

The constituency has been represented since 2026 by United Russia deputy Igor Rudensky, six-term State Duma member and businessman, who won the open seat left vacant following the death of two-term United Russia incumbent Aleksandr Samokutyayev in June 2026.

== Boundaries ==
1993–2007 Zheleznodorozhny constituency: Bashmakovsky District, Bekovsky District, Belinsky District, Bessonovsky District, Issinsky District, Kamenka, Kamensky District, Mokshansky District, Narovchatsky District, Nizhnelomovsky District, Pachelmsky District, Penza (Oktyabrsky, Zheleznodorozhny), Spassky District, Tamalinsky District, Vadinsky District, Zarechny, Zemetchinsky District
The constituency covered north-eastern half of Penza as well rural northern and western Penza Oblast, including the towns Kamenka and Zarechny.

2016–present: Bashmakovsky District, Bekovsky District, Belinsky District, Bessonovsky District, Issinsky District, Kamensky District, Mokshansky District, Narovchatsky District, Nizhnelomovsky District, Pachelmsky District, Penza (Oktyabrsky, Zheleznodorozhny), Spassky District, Tamalinsky District, Vadinsky District, Zarechny, Zemetchinsky District
The constituency was re-created for the 2016 election under the name "Lermontovsky constituency" and was virtually unchanged.

== Members elected ==
Election	Member	Party
1993	Valery Goryachev	Yavlinsky—Boldyrev—Lukin
1995	Aleksandr Rygalov	Agrarian Party
1999	Igor Rudensky	Fatherland – All Russia
2003	Igor Rudensky	United Russia
2007	Proportional representation - no election by constituency	
2011	Proportional representation - no election by constituency	
2016	Leonid Levin (Note: appointed as Deputy Chief of Staff of the Government of Russia in January 2020)	A Just Russia
2020	Aleksandr Samokutyayev (Note: died in June 2026)	A Just Russia
2021	Aleksandr Samokutyayev	United Russia
2026	Igor Rudensky	United Russia

== Election results ==
=== 1993 ===
Summary of the 12 December 1993 Russian legislative election in the Zheleznodorozhny constituency
Candidate	Party	Votes	%
Valery Goryachev	Yavlinsky—Boldyrev—Lukin	97,998	27.07%
Mikhail Sharov	Independent	49,820	13.76%
Sergey Korobov	Liberal Democratic Party	30,689	8.48%
Nikolay Urakcheyev	Independent	29,369	8.11%
Valery Markin	Choice of Russia	16,437	4.54%
Aleksey Urusov	Democratic Party	15,436	4.26%
Aleksandr Korobchenko	Party of Russian Unity and Accord	12,805	3.54%
Mikhail Legashnev	Independent	9,901	2.73%
Leonid Antsev	Civic Union	8,852	2.45%
Sergey Simonov	Future of Russia–New Names	5,534	1.53%
against all		57,911	16.00%
Total		362,029	100%

=== 1995 ===
Summary of the 17 December 1995 Russian legislative election in the Zheleznodorozhny constituency
Candidate	Party	Votes	%
Aleksandr Rygalov	Agrarian Party	163,482	40.35%
Valery Goryachev (incumbent)	Yabloko	59,302	14.64%
Sergey Korobov	Liberal Democratic Party	39,023	9.63%
Yury Zatsepin	Our Home – Russia	21,650	5.34%
Yury Grishin	Russian Lawyers' Association	13,835	3.41%
Vladimir Fomin	Independent	13,790	3.40%
Pyotr Bredikhin	Independent	11,329	2.80%
Vladimir Didenko	Democratic Choice of Russia – United Democrats	11,306	2.79%
Anatoly Aleksyutin	Ivan Rybkin Bloc	10,289	2.54%
Rinat Galiakberov	Independent	8,032	1.98%
Gennady Filatov	People's Union	7,717	1.90%
Aleksandr Sergeyenko	Stable Russia	3,468	0.86%
against all		35,074	8.66%
Total		405,203	100%

=== 1999 ===
Summary of the 19 December 1999 Russian legislative election in the Zheleznodorozhny constituency
Candidate	Party	Votes	%
Igor Rudensky	Fatherland – All Russia	131,983	36.28%
Yury Lyzhin	Communist Party	109,024	29.97%
Valery Goryachev	Yabloko	28,158	7.74%
Viktor Yermakov	Independent	24,972	6.86%
Viktor Dyuldin	Independent	8,778	2.41%
Sergey Korobov	Andrey Nikolayev and Svyatoslav Fyodorov Bloc	8,509	2.34%
against all		42,942	11.80%
Total		363,786	100%

=== 2003 ===
Summary of the 7 December 2003 Russian legislative election in the Zheleznodorozhny constituency
Candidate	Party	Votes	%
Igor Rudensky (incumbent)	United Russia	209,069	62.95%
Viktor Ilyukhin	Communist Party	69,128	20.82%
Aleksandr Seynov	Yabloko	9,476	2.85%
Viktor Dyuldin	Great Russia – Eurasian Union	5,284	1.59%
Valentina Yazvenko	United Russian Party Rus'	2,757	0.83%
against all		30,431	9.16%
Total		332,404	100%

=== 2016 ===
Summary of the 18 September 2016 Russian legislative election in the Lermontovsky constituency
Candidate	Party	Votes	%
Leonid Levin	A Just Russia	208,466	61.85%
Dmitry Filyayev	Communist Party	41,214	12.33%
Aleksandr Vasilyev	Liberal Democratic Party	35,290	10.47%
Viktoria Dobrovolskaya	Communists of Russia	20,185	5.99%
Andrey Mamonov	Rodina	8,712	2.58%
Dmitry Gaynullin	Party of Growth	7,906	2.35%
Vasily Melnichenko	The Greens	5,057	1.50%
Total		337,054	100%

=== 2020 ===
Summary of the 13 September 2020 by-election in the Lermontovsky constituency
Candidate	Party	Votes	%
Aleksandr Samokutyayev	A Just Russia	162,004	60.38%
Aleksandr Trutnev	Communist Party	34,925	13.02%
Vadim Serdovintsev	Liberal Democratic Party	19,803	7.38%
Yevgeny Vorozhtsov	Party of Pensioners	19,626	7.32%
Fatima Khugayeva	Communists of Russia	11,118	4.14%
Kirill Metalnikov	Civic Platform	10,957	4.08%
Total		268,286	100%

=== 2021 ===
Summary of the 17-19 September 2021 Russian legislative election in the Lermontovsky constituency
Candidate	Party	Votes	%
Aleksandr Samokutyayev (incumbent)	United Russia	151,889	53.64%
Aleksandr Trutnev	Communist Party	48,095	16.98%
Aleksey Shpagin	A Just Russia — For Truth	29,521	10.43%
Andrey Rekayev	Liberal Democratic Party	16,157	5.71%
Igor Nikitenko	Party of Pensioners	15,514	5.48%
Kirill Metalnikov	Yabloko	12,422	4.39%
Total		283,162	100%

=== 2026 ===
Summary of the 18-20 September 2026 Russian legislative election in the Lermontovsky constituency
Candidate	Party	Votes	%
Igor Rudensky	United Russia	187,841	63.26%
Andrey Zhdannikov	Communist Party	41,461	13.96%
Mikhail Sharonov	New People	21,840	7.35%
Anna Mikhalishcheva	Liberal Democratic Party	18,071	6.09%
Vladimir Chekarev	A Just Russia	12,080	4.07%
Mikhail Irikov	Communists of Russia	10,545	3.55%
Total		296,947	100%
