= Penza constituency =

Penza single-member constituency
- Constituency of the Russian State Duma

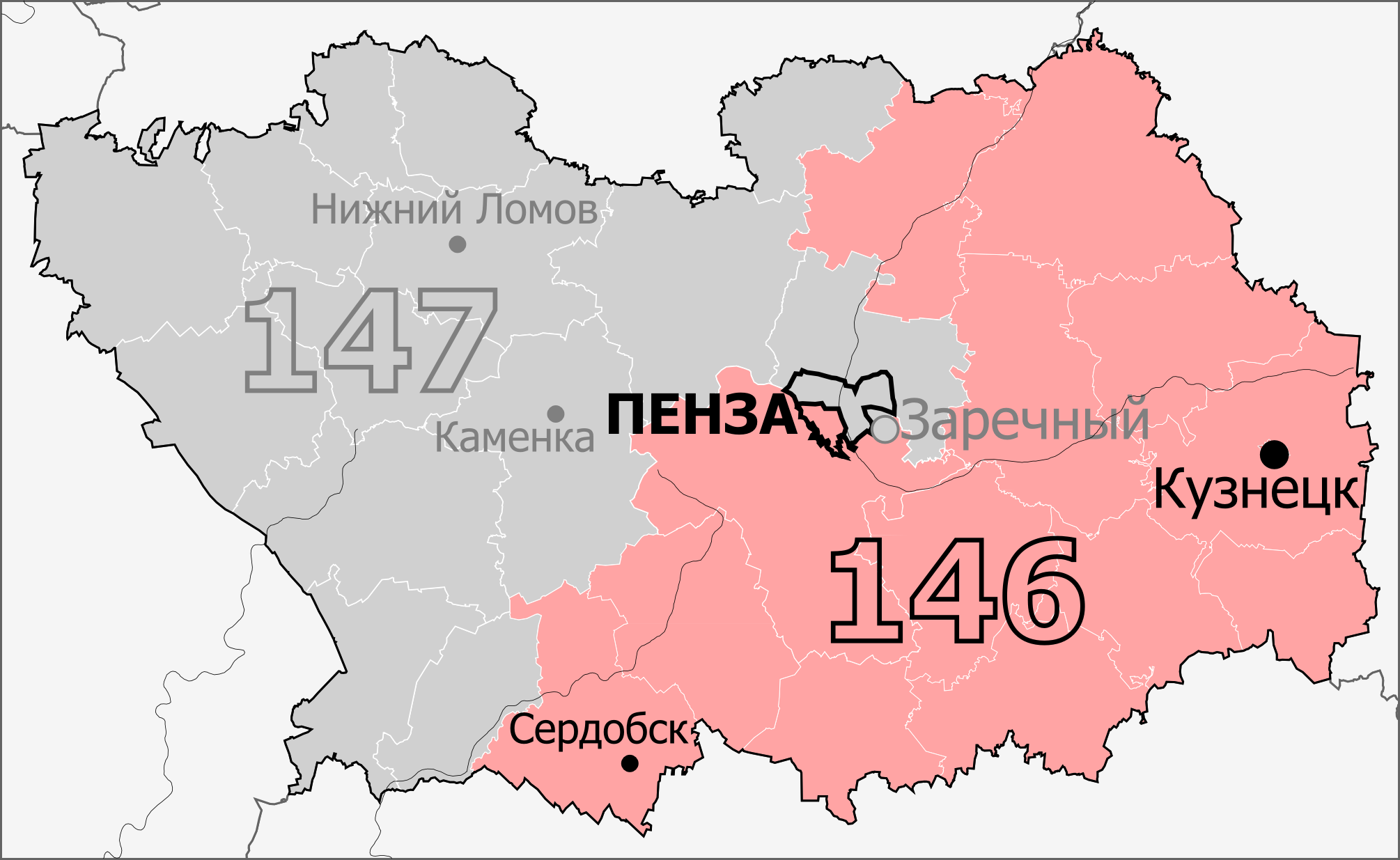
- Constituency boundaries since 2016
- Deputy: Dmitry Kadenkov; United Russia
- Federal subject: Penza Oblast
- Districts: Gorodishchensky, Kameshkirsky, Kolyshleysky, Kuznetsk, Kuznetsky, Lopatinsky, Luninsky, Maloserdobinsky, Neverkinsky, Nikolsky, Penza (Leninsky, Pervomaysky), Penzensky, Serdobsky, Shemysheysky, Sosnovoborsky
- Voters: 477,459 (2026)

The Penza constituency (No.148 (Note: Pervomaysky constituency No.136 in 1993-2007, No.146 in 2016–2026)) is a Russian legislative constituency in Penza Oblast. The constituency covers south-western half of Penza as well as eastern and southern Penza Oblast.

The constituency has been represented since 2026 by United Russia deputy Dmitry Kadenkov, two-term State Duma member and former Chief Federal Inspector for Penza Oblast, who won the open seat after five-term United Russia incumbent Igor Rudensky successfully sought re-election in the neighbouring Lermontovsky constituency.

== Boundaries ==
1993–2007 Pervomaysky constituency: Gorodishchensky District, Kameshkirsky District, Kolyshleysky District, Kondolsky District, (Note: Merged into Penzensky District in 2006.), Kuznetsk, Kuznetsky District, Lopatinsky District, Luninsky District, Maloserdobinsky District, Neverkinsky District, Nikolsky District, Penza (Leninsky, Pervomaysky), Penzensky District, Serdobsk, Serdobsky District, Shemysheysky District, Sosnovoborsky District
The constituency covered south-western half of Penza as well rural southern and eastern Penza Oblast, including the towns Kuznetsk and Serdobsk.

2016–present: Gorodishchensky District, Kameshkirsky District, Kolyshleysky District, Kuznetsk, Kuznetsky District, Lopatinsky District, Luninsky District, Maloserdobinsky District, Neverkinsky District, Nikolsky District, Penza (Leninsky, Pervomaysky), Penzensky District, Serdobsky District, Shemysheysky District, Sosnovoborsky District
The constituency was re-created for the 2016 election under the name "Penza constituency" and was virtually unchanged.

== Members elected ==
Election	Member	Party
1993	Viktor Ilyukhin	Communist Party
1995	Viktor Ilyukhin	Communist Party
1999	Viktor Ilyukhin	Movement in Support of the Army
2003	Viktor Lazutkin	Independent
2007	Proportional representation - no election by constituency	
2011	Proportional representation - no election by constituency	
2016	Sergey Yesyakov	United Russia
2021	Igor Rudensky	United Russia
2026	Dmitry Kadenkov	United Russia

== Election results ==
=== 1993 ===
Summary of the 12 December 1993 Russian legislative election in the Pervomaysky constituency
Candidate	Party	Votes	%
Viktor Ilyukhin	Communist Party	102,026	27.40%
Vladimir Grachev	Independent	48,978	13.16%
Asiyat Dashkin	Independent	33,351	8.96%
Konstantin Voytsekhovsky	Independent	29,528	7.93%
Linina Ivanova	Yavlinsky—Boldyrev—Lukin	20,666	5.55%
Viktor Tokarev	Democratic Party	17,209	4.62%
Aleksandr Knyazev	Party of Russian Unity and Accord	10,588	2.84%
Yevgeny Bezborodov	Civic Union	10,328	2.77%
Sergey Tyurin	Future of Russia–New Names	9,763	2.62%
Vasily Bezmenov	Choice of Russia	8,384	2.25%
against all		51,551	13.85%
Total		372,296	100%

=== 1995 ===
Summary of the 17 December 1995 Russian legislative election in the Pervomaysky constituency
Candidate	Party	Votes	%
Viktor Ilyukhin (incumbent)	Communist Party	230,504	55.66%
Gennady Yeroshin	Our Home – Russia	44,359	10.71%
Vladimir Sheludko	Party of Workers' Self-Government	23,806	5.75%
Sergey Dubinin	Liberal Democratic Party	16,472	3.98%
Konstantin Voytsekhovsky	Democratic Choice of Russia – United Democrats	16,366	3.95%
Vladimir Strelnikov	Congress of Russian Communities	10,167	2.45%
Viktor Belousov	Independent	10,107	2.44%
Viktor Kiselev	Independent	9,240	2.23%
Viktor Karabayev	Union of Workers of ZhKKh	7,545	1.82%
Mikhail Petrov	Independent	6,896	1.67%
Viktor Ivanov	Stable Russia	6,819	1.65%
against all		25,145	6.07%
Total		414,164	100%

=== 1999 ===
Summary of the 19 December 1999 Russian legislative election in the Pervomaysky constituency
Candidate	Party	Votes	%
Viktor Ilyukhin (incumbent)	Movement in Support of the Army	111,532	30.57%
Vladimir Ruzlyayev	Fatherland – All Russia	71,825	19.68%
Aleksandr Kislov	Independent	54,465	14.93%
Nikolay Brusnikin	Union of Right Forces	35,890	9.84%
Vladimir Sheludko	Yabloko	20,961	5.74%
Vladimir Popov	Independent	10,663	2.92%
Galina Zhukova	Independent	9,400	2.58%
Asiyat Dashkin	Independent	7,289	2.00%
Yevgeny Kuznetsov	Congress of Russian Communities-Yury Boldyrev Movement	3,142	0.86%
against all		33,818	9.27%
Total		364,876	100%

=== 2003 ===
Summary of the 7 December 2003 Russian legislative election in the Pervomaysky constituency
Candidate	Party	Votes	%
Viktor Lazutkin	Independent	179,687	54.23%
Igor Ryabov	New Course — Automobile Russia	31,600	9.54%
Oleg Kochkin	Yabloko	29,267	8.83%
Viktor Karabayev	Communist Party	29,124	8.79%
Maksim Meyer	Independent	11,984	3.62%
Kyazym Deberdeyev	Independent	10,487	3.16%
against all		34,299	10.35%
Total		331,631	100%

=== 2016 ===
Summary of the 18 September 2016 Russian legislative election in the Penza constituency
Candidate	Party	Votes	%
Sergey Yesyakov	United Russia	205,575	63.97%
Georgy Kamnev	Communist Party	42,990	13.38%
Lyudmila Kolomytseva	A Just Russia	26,443	8.23%
Pavel Kulikov	Liberal Democratic Party	18,580	5.78%
Andrey Nikiforov	Communists of Russia	6,172	1.92%
Anatoly Aleksyutin	The Greens	6,069	1.89%
Aleksey Pakayev	Rodina	4,035	1.25%
Sergey Korobov	Patriots of Russia	3,655	1.14%
Total		321,367	100%

=== 2021 ===
Summary of the 17-19 September 2021 Russian legislative election in the Penza constituency
Candidate	Party	Votes	%
Igor Rudensky	United Russia	182,166	60.40%
Aleksey Ivanov	Communist Party	45,604	15.12%
Pavel Kulikov	Liberal Democratic Party	15,564	5.16%
Andrey Abramov	Party of Pensioners	13,174	4.37%
Sergey Novikov	New People	12,891	4.27%
Anton Yurchenko	A Just Russia — For Truth	12,104	4.01%
Alina Mozhachkina-Gribanova	The Greens	6,562	2.18%
Yury Voblikov	Yabloko	3,982	1.32%
Sergey Yakhov	Russian Party of Freedom and Justice	3,843	1.27%
Total		301,613	100%

=== 2026 ===
Summary of the 18-20 September 2026 Russian legislative election in the Penza constituency
Candidate	Party	Votes	%
Dmitry Kadenkov	United Russia	167,980	57.94%
Oleg Shalyapin	Communist Party	41,686	14.38%
Aleksandr Vasilyev	Liberal Democratic Party	25,448	8.78%
Dmitry Lvov	New People	23,552	8.12%
Mikhail Lisin	A Just Russia	17,811	6.14%
Aleksey Shpagin	Communists of Russia	10,455	3.61%
Total		289,924	100%
