= Bashmakovo =

Bashmakovo (Russian: Башмаково) is the name of several inhabited localities in Russia.

Urban localities

- Bashmakovo, Penza Oblast, a work settlement in Bashmakovsky District of Penza Oblast

Rural localities

- Bashmakovo, Kostroma Oblast, a village in Tsentralnoye Settlement of Buysky District of Kostroma Oblast
- Bashmakovo, Oryol Oblast, a village in Alekhinsky Selsoviet of Khotynetsky District of Oryol Oblast
- Bashmakovo, Pskov Oblast, a village in Nevelsky District of Pskov Oblast
- Bashmakovo, Kalininsky District, Tver Oblast, a village in Kalininsky District, Tver Oblast
- Bashmakovo, Staritsky District, Tver Oblast, a village in Staritsky District, Tver Oblast
- Bashmakovo, Fakelsky Selsoviet, Igrinsky District, Udmurt Republic, a village in Fakelsky Selsoviet of Igrinsky District of the Udmurt Republic
- Bashmakovo, Muzhbersky Selsoviet, Igrinsky District, Udmurt Republic, a village in Muzhbersky Selsoviet of Igrinsky District of the Udmurt Republic
