= Rodnikovsky (rural locality) =

Rodnikovsky (Russian: Родниковский; masculine), Rodnikovskaya (Родниковская; feminine), or Rodnikovskoye (Родниковское; neuter) is the name of several rural localities in Russia.

Modern localities

- Rodnikovsky, Karachay-Cherkess Republic, a khutor in Prikubansky District of the Karachay-Cherkess Republic
- Rodnikovsky, Krasnodar Krai, a khutor in Sovetsky Rural Okrug of Novokubansky District of Krasnodar Krai
- Rodnikovsky, Penza Oblast, a settlement under the administrative jurisdiction of the Work Settlement of Kolyshley in Kolyshleysky District of Penza Oblast
- Rodnikovsky, Stavropol Krai, a khutor in Ust-Nevinsky Selsoviet of Kochubeyevsky District of Stavropol Krai
- Rodnikovsky, Nekhayevsky District, Volgograd Oblast, a khutor in Zakhopersky Selsoviet of Nekhayevsky District of Volgograd Oblast
- Rodnikovsky, Novoanninsky District, Volgograd Oblast, a khutor in Staroanninsky Selsoviet of Novoanninsky District of Volgograd Oblast
- Rodnikovskoye, a selo in Arzgirsky District of Stavropol Krai
- Rodnikovskaya, a stanitsa in Rodnikovsky Rural Okrug of Kurganinsky District of Krasnodar Krai

Alternative names

- Rodnikovsky, alternative name of Rodnikovy, a settlement under the administrative jurisdiction of Maykop Republican Urban Okrug in the Republic of Adygea
