= Pachelma =

Set index of articles associated with the same name

Pachelma (Russian: Пачелма) may refer to:

- Pachelma (urban-type settlement), workers' settlement
- Pachelma (rural locality), village in Chkalovsky Selsoviet, Pachelmsky District, Russia
- Pachelma River
- Pachelma (station)
