= Yagodina =

Yagodina may refer to:

- Yagodina, Perm Krai, a village in Russia
- Yagodina, a village in Smolyan Province, Bulgaria
- Yagodina Knoll, a hill in Antarctica

== See also ==
- Jagodina, a city in Serbia
- Yagodny, several places with the name in Russia
