= Naryshkino =

Set index of articles associated with the same name

Naryshkino (Russian: Нарышкино) is the name of several inhabited localities in Russia.

Urban localities

- Naryshkino, Uritsky District, Oryol Oblast, an urban-type settlement in Uritsky District of Oryol Oblast

Rural localities

- Naryshkino, Lipetsk Oblast, a selo in Lozovsky Selsoviet of Chaplyginsky District of Lipetsk Oblast
- Naryshkino, Nizhny Novgorod Oblast, a selo in Naryshkinsky Selsoviet of Voznesensky District of Nizhny Novgorod Oblast
- Naryshkino, Mtsensky District, Oryol Oblast, a village in Otradinsky Selsoviet of Mtsensky District of Oryol Oblast
- Naryshkino, Penza Oblast, a village under the administrative jurisdiction of the work settlement of Zemetchino in Zemetchinsky District of Penza Oblast
- Naryshkino, Kasimovsky District, Ryazan Oblast, a village in Shcherbatovsky Rural Okrug of Kasimovsky District of Ryazan Oblast
- Naryshkino, Miloslavsky District, Ryazan Oblast, a village in Murayevinsky Rural Okrug of Miloslavsky District of Ryazan Oblast
- Naryshkino, Tambov Oblast, a village in Uspenovsky Selsoviet of Petrovsky District of Tambov Oblast
- Naryshkino, Aleksinsky District, Tula Oblast, a village in Spas-Koninsky Rural Okrug of Aleksinsky District of Tula Oblast
- Naryshkino, Tyoplo-Ogaryovsky District, Tula Oblast, a selo in Naryshkinsky Rural Okrug of Tyoplo-Ogaryovsky District of Tula Oblast
