= Vetchininovo =

Vetchininovo Ветчининово
- Selo
- Location within Belgorod Oblast Location within Russia
- Coordinates: 50°21′N 37°51′E
- Country: Russia
- Region: Belgorod Oblast
- District: Volokonovsky District

Population (2010)
  - Total: 123
- Time zone: UTC+3:00

Vetchininovo (Russian: Ветчининово) is a rural locality (a selo) in Volokonovsky District, Belgorod Oblast, Russia. The population was 123 as of 2010. There are 2 streets.

== Geography ==
Vetchininovo is located 16 km south of Volokonovka (the district's administrative centre) by road. Ulyanovka is the nearest rural locality.
