= Zolotaryovskoe Gorodishche =

Coordinates: 53°05′05″N 45°17′20″E

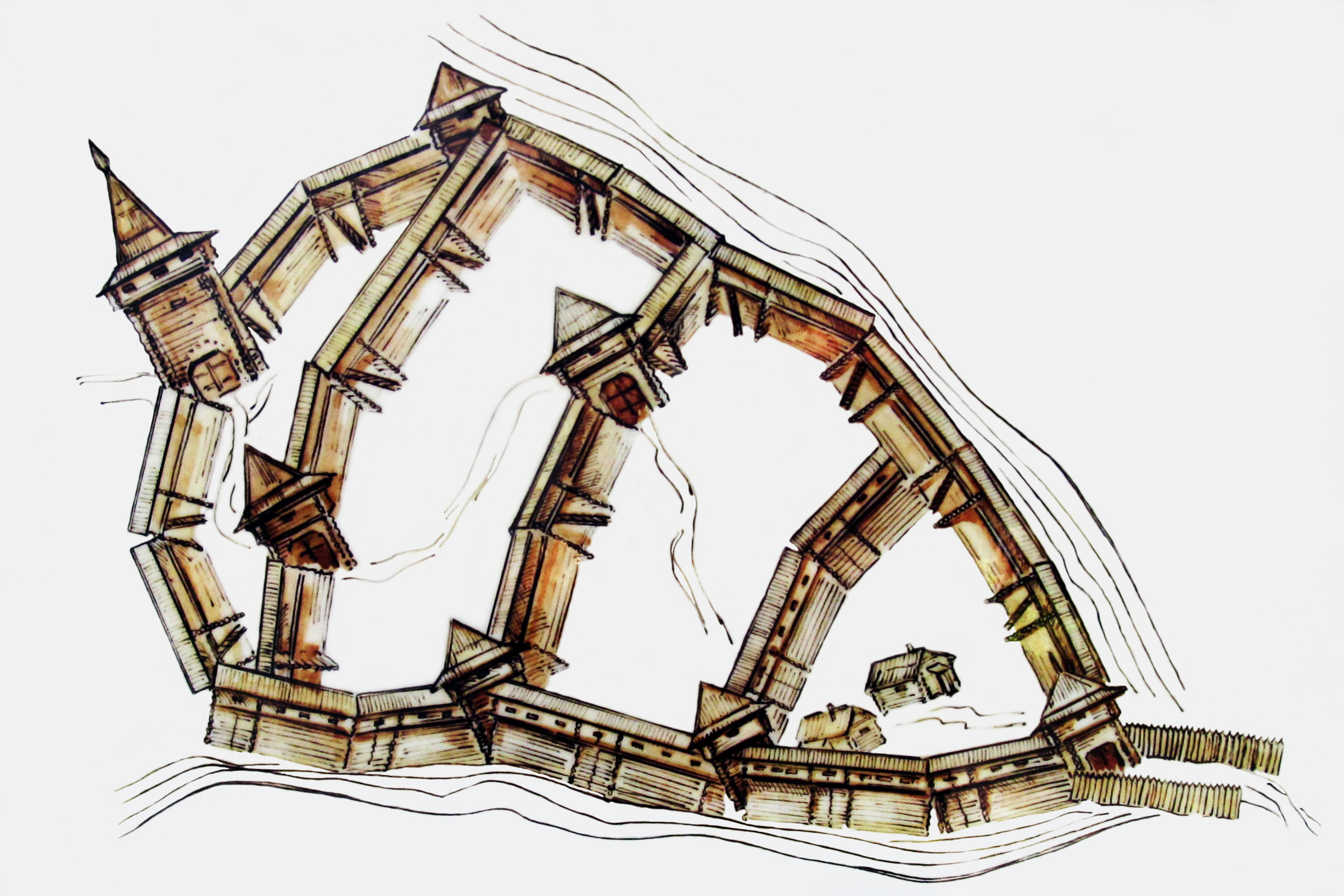
Sketch of Zolotarevskoe Gorodishche

Zolotaryovskoe Gorodishche (Russian: Золотарёвское городище) (Note: Also known as Zolotarevskoe settlement, Zolotarevsky settlement, Zolotaryovka Settlement, etc.) is an archeological site in Penza Oblast, Russia about 1.5km no the West of the settlement of Zolotaryovka. It is conjectured that it was a border fort of Volga Bulgaria. A large number of the remnants of warriors was found in the vicinity, suggesting it was a location of major battle at around 1237 with Mongol invaders. It is a registered object of cultural heritage of Russia.

Journalist N. Kryukov stipulates that the place was called Sernya by local Moksha people.
