= Rodnikovsky =

Rodnikovsky (masculine), Rodnikovskaya (feminine), or Rodnikovskoye (neuter) may refer to:

- Rodnikovsky District, a district of Ivanovo Oblast, Russia
- Rodnikovskoe Urban Settlement, a municipal formation which the town of Rodniki in Rodnikovsky District of Ivanovo Oblast, Russia is incorporated as
- Rodnikovsky (rural locality) (Rodnikovskaya, Rodnikovskoye), several rural localities in Russia
