= Russky Kameshkir =

Rural locality in Penza Oblast, Russia

Coordinates: 52°51′35″N 46°05′20″E

Russky Kameshkir (Russian: Ру́сский Камешки́р) is a rural locality (a selo) and the administrative center of Kameshkirsky District, Penza Oblast, Russia. Population: 5,369 (2010 census); 5,376 (2002 census); 5,555 (1989 Soviet census).
