= Viktor Malyuk =

Russian serial killer

- Born: Viktor Ivanovich Malyuk; 5 July 1961; Zemetchino, Penza Oblast, RSFSR
- Died: 1 August 2004 (aged 43); Moscow, Russia
- Cause of death: Suicide by hanging
- Other name: "The Ad Killer"
- Conviction: Murder
- Penalty: Life imprisonment

Details
- Victims: 4
- Span of crimes: 2000–2001
- Country: Russia
- State: Moscow
- Date apprehended: 12 March 2002

Viktor Ivanovich Malyuk (Russian: Ви́ктор Ива́нович Малю́к; 5 July 1961 – 1 August 2004), known as The Ad Killer (Russian: Убийца по объявлениям), was a Russian serial killer who killed 4 people between 2000 and 2001.

== Biography ==
After graduation, Malyuk entered a forestry college, but did not intend to associate his life with this sphere. He considered himself a talented person, engaged in music and was a director of the amateur theatre ensemble in the Ukhta Palace of Culture. Considering that in this province his talent could not be realised, Malyuk left for Moscow in 1999. He dreamed of settling in some popular band, touring and earning money. However, everywhere Malyuk went he received a refusal, and eventually ran out of money. His ambitions interfered with returning to Ukhta, however.

The main way for Malyuk to earn money was to purchase and sell household appliances and electronics, which he bought at a low price and, if necessary, repaired and then sold again. Even when he committed his crimes, his main income was precisely speculation and not prey from the murders, which suggested that it was self-interest that motivated him, but a desire to kill. Over time, Maluyk became closed up, nervous and irritable. When he realised that he could not count on taking part in musical groups, it drove him into a deep depression. Once during a deal, he was robbed, and on the day after that, he went to the market where he bought a Beretta with a few packs of cartridges and a Makarov pistol from an unknown seller. At home with the help of some tools, he altered the Beretta. Subsequently, one of the investigators into the Malyuk case said:

...It seemed to me that Malyuk just wanted to assert himself, that is, if you are capable of killing - then you are a worthy man...

In November 2000, Malyuk committed his first crime. His victim was photographer Maxim Fedan, whom Malyuk lured out under the pretext of buying a camera from him. Originally Malyuk did not plan on killing him, but when the photographer actively resisted, he shot him three times. Fedan had enough strength to jump out of the car and run a few meters, but then fell over and died. Malyuk then took the camera from the dead man and left the crime scene. Two people from neighbouring houses witnessed the event from their windows. One of them, a certain Tarverdiev, ran out in the street and, not disdaining the looting, took a mobile phone from the dead Fedan. At this time he was noticed by a militsiya patrol, who detained him and subsequently convicted him of theft and failure to provide assistance.

The next day, after reviewing a criminal chronicle, Malyuk was satisfied that he was finally in the spotlight. One day, in May 2001, while examining newspaper ads, the killer drew attention to the article "Sentenced to an armchair", which described the problems of an elderly woman, Lebedeva, who had been given adequate attention by her guardian. On 29 May 2001, Malyuk devised a plan - he ordered an expensive laptop from a computer firm and killed the businessman who came to Lebedeva's address, then entered and shot her as well. Another victim of Malyuk was an on-looker. According to the investigators, when Malyuk killed this man, he also decimated his chances of escaping. On 7 September 2001, Malyuk killed witness Viktor Gusev with a total of 7 shots and then stole 950 dollars from him.

=== Arrest ===
On 12 March 2002, Viktor Malyuk was detained on suspicion of committing four murders. Throughout the investigation and at the trial the murderer did not admit guilt in any way, and wrote many complaints to all instances. The forensic psychiatric examinations recognized Malyuk as sane and responsible for his actions. On 26 December 2003, the Moscow City Court sentenced him to life imprisonment. Since the introduction of jury trials in Moscow, it was the first time that all jurors agreed on the version of the charges. In the spring of 2004, the Supreme Court of Russia upheld the verdict without change. However, a day prior to his shipment to a prison colony, Viktor Malyuk killed himself, hanging himself with his bed sheets.

== In the media ==
- Documentary film "Murder by advertisement" from the series "Criminal Russia"

== See also ==
- List of Russian serial killers
