= Alexander Mikhailov (information scientist) =

Soviet engineer (1905–1988)

Alexander Ivanovich Mikhailov (Russian: Александр Иванович Михайлов; 6 December 1905, Zemetchino – 6 February 1988, Moscow) was a Soviet and Russian engineer and information scientist. He was one of the most influential thinkers related to the field of information science in the Soviet Union and the Eastern Bloc.

== Biography ==
Mikhailov graduated in 1931 in mechanical engineering from the Mendeleev Institute and had a successful career in plane and aircraft engineering in the 1930s and 1940s. At the beginning of the 1950s, he participated in the creation and development of VINITI, an institute devoted to the study and practice of Scientific Information in Russia. The institute opened in 1952, and Mikhailov became director from October 1956 until his death.

From the 1960s to the 1980s, Mikhailov had considerable participation in the International Federation for Information and Documentation, became two times vice-director of the institute (1969 to 1976 - 1981 to 1988), coordinating the Study Committee Research on Theoretical Basis of Information, or FID/RI and became the editor-in-chief of the institute periodical, International Forum for Information and Documentation, between 1975 and 1988.

In the 1960s, he developed, with other authors, the concept of Informatics (Informatika in Russian), related to the study, organization and the dissemination of scientific information. His principal works in this field are the books Fundamentals of Scientific Information (1965), Fundamentals Of Informatics (1968) and Scientific Communications and Informatics (1976), all of them written with Arkadii Chernyi and Ruggero Gilyarevsky.
