= Aleksei Makushkin =

Russian footballer

Personal information
- Full name: Aleksei Aleksandrovich Makushkin
- Date of birth: 17 September 1997 (age 29)
- Place of birth: Tamala, Russia
- Height: 1.81 m (5 ft 11 1/2 in)
- Position: Defender

Senior career*
Years	Team	Apps	(Gls)
2015	FC Lada-Togliatti	1	(0)
2015–2016	FC Krylia Sovetov Samara	0	(0)
2017	FC Zenit-Izhevsk	14	(0)
2018	FC Volga Ulyanovsk	3	(0)
2019–2022	FC Tekstilshchik Ivanovo	65	(0)
2022–2023	FC Khimik Dzerzhinsk	23	(0)
2023–2024	FC Nosta Novotroitsk	35	(0)
2025	FC Zenit Penza	24	(0)
- * Club domestic league appearances and goals as of 1 November 2025

Aleksei Aleksandrovich Makushkin (Russian: Алексей Александрович Макушкин; born 17 September 1997) is a Russian football player.

== Club career ==
He made his debut in the Russian Professional Football League for FC Lada-Togliatti on 5 June 2015 in a game against FC Spartak Yoshkar-Ola.

He made his Russian Football National League debut for FC Tekstilshchik Ivanovo on 20 July 2019 in a game against FC Khimki.
