= Igor Rudensky =

Russian politician (born 1962)

- Игорь Руденский
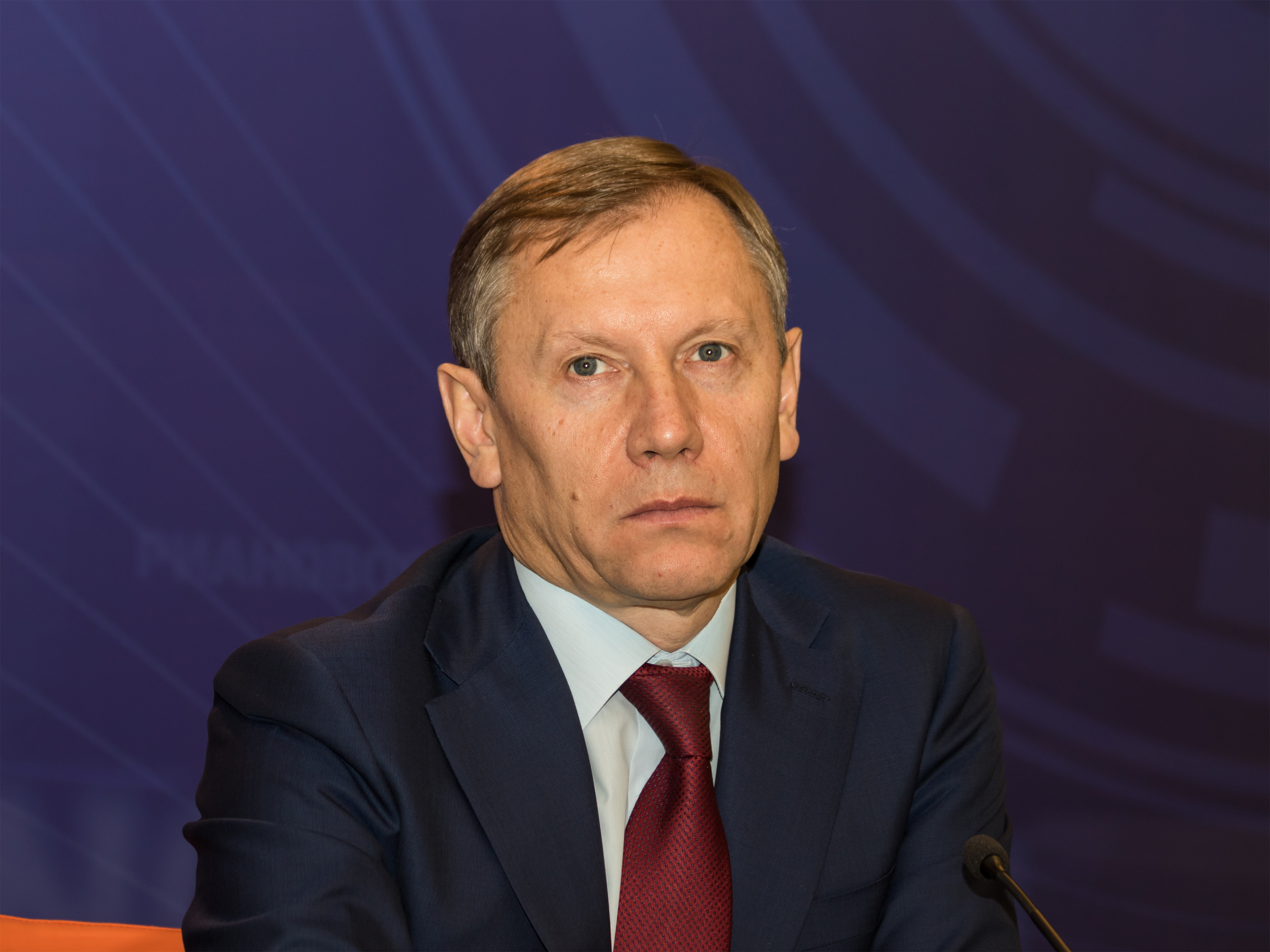

Member of the State Duma for Penza Oblast
- Incumbent
- Assumed office 12 October 2021
- Preceded by: Sergey Yesyakov
- Constituency: Penza (No. 146)
- In office 18 January 2000 – 24 December 2007
- Preceded by: Aleksandr Rygalov
- Succeeded by: constituencies abolished
- Constituency: Zheleznodorozhny (No. 135)

Member of the State Duma (Party List Seat)
- In office 24 December 2007 – 5 October 2016

Personal details
- Born: 11 September 1962 (age 64) Iksha, Dmitrovsky District, Moscow Oblast, RSFSR, USSR
- Party: United Russia
- Education: Riga Flight Technical School of Civil Aviation

Igor Nikolayevich Rudensky (Russian: Игорь Николаевич Руденский; born 11 September 1962 in Iksha, Dmitrovsky District, Moscow Oblast) is a Russian political figure and a deputy of the 3rd, 4th, 5th, 6th, and 8th State Dumas. In 2003, he was granted a Candidate of Sciences in Economics degree.

After graduating from the Riga Flight Technical School of Civil Aviation, Rudensky held various positions in the production sphere. From 1999 to 2016, he was a deputy of the 3rd, 4th, 5th, and 6th State Dumas. Since September 2021, he has served as deputy of the 8th State Duma from the Penza constituency.

In 2014, Rudensky filed a lawsuit against oppositioner Alexei Navalny. The reason for the lawsuit was the information disseminated by Navalny that Rudensky did not mention the land plot that he owned in the tax declaration for 2012. The Lyublino District Court of Moscow satisfied the claim.

== Sanctions ==
He was sanctioned by Canada under the Special Economic Measures Act (S.C. 1992, c. 17) in relation to the Russian invasion of Ukraine for Grave Breach of International Peace and Security, and by the UK government in 2022 in relation to Russo-Ukrainian War.

== Awards ==
- Order of Honour (2012)
- Medal of the Order "For Merit to the Fatherland", II degree (2005)
- Medal of P. A. Stolypin, II degree (2014)
