= Chaadayevka =

Chaadayevka Чаадаевка
- Urban-type settlement
- Interactive map of Chaadayevka
- Location of Chaadayevka Chaadayevka (Penza Oblast)
- Coordinates: 53.1419°N 45.9127°E
- Country: Russia
- Federal subject: Penza Oblast
- Administrative district: Gorodishchensky District

Population (2010 Census)
  - Total: 7,599
  - Estimate (2021): 6,734 (−11.4%)
- Time zone: UTC+3 (MSK)
- Postal codes: 442325, 442324
- OKTMO ID: 56618155051

Chaadayevka (Russian: Чаада́евка) is an urban locality (an urban-type settlement) in Gorodishchensky District of Penza Oblast, Russia. Population: 7,599 (2010 census); 7,167 (2002 census); 8,755 (1989 Soviet census).
