= Sursk =

Town in Penza Oblast, Russia

Sursk Сурск
- Town
- Interactive map of Sursk
- Location of Sursk Sursk (Penza Oblast)
- Coordinates: 53°05′N 45°42′E
- Country: Russia
- Federal subject: Penza Oblast
- Administrative district: Gorodishchensky District
- Town of district significanceSelsoviet: Sursk
- Founded: 1860
- Town status since: 1953
- Elevation: 220 m (720 ft)

Population (2010 Census)
  - Total: 7,034
  - Estimate (2021): 6,034 (−14.2%)

Administrative status
  - Capital of: town of district significance of Sursk

Municipal status
  - Municipal district: Gorodishchensky Municipal District
  - Urban settlement: Sursk Urban Settlement
  - Capital of: Sursk Urban Settlement
- Time zone: UTC+3 (MSK)
- Postal codes: 442300, 442301
- OKTMO ID: 56618108001

Sursk (Russian: Сурск) is a town in Gorodishchensky District of Penza Oblast, Russia, located on the left bank of the Sura River, 92 kilometers (57 mi) east of Penza, the administrative center of the oblast. Population: 7,034 (2010 census).

== History ==
It was founded c. 1860 as the village of Nikolsky Khutor (Нико́льский Ху́тор). In 1953, it was granted town status and renamed Sursk (after the Sura River).

== Administrative and municipal status ==
Within the framework of administrative divisions, it is incorporated within Gorodishchensky District as the town of district significance of Sursk. As a municipal division, the town of district significance of Sursk is incorporated within Gorodishchensky Municipal District as Sursk Urban Settlement.
