= Yagodnoye, Vladimir Oblast =

Yagodnoye Ягодное
- Village
- Location within Vladimir Oblast Location within Russia
- Coordinates: 56°10′N 40°01′E
- Country: Russia
- Region: Vladimir Oblast
- District: Sobinsky District
- Time zone: UTC+3:00

Yagodnoye (Russian: Ягодное) is a rural locality (a village) in Tolpukhovskoye Rural Settlement, Sobinsky District, Vladimir Oblast, Russia. The population was 5 as of 2010. There are 5 streets.

== Geography ==
Yagodnoye is located 25 km north of Sobinka (the district's administrative centre) by road. Vysokovo is the nearest rural locality.
