= Yagodny, Altai Krai =

Yagodny Ягодный
- Settlement
- Location within Altai Krai Location within Russia
- Coordinates: 52°38′N 85°16′E
- Country: Russia
- Region: Altai Krai
- District: Biysky District
- Time zone: UTC+7:00

Yagodny (Russian: Ягодный) is a rural locality (a settlement) in Pevomaysky Selsoviet, Biysky District, Altai Krai, Russia. The population was 174 as of 2013. There are 5 streets.

== Geography ==
Yagodny is located 14 km north of Biysk (the district's administrative centre) by road. Pervomayskoye is the nearest rural locality.
