= Mokshansky District =

Mokshansky District Мокшанский район (Russian)
- District
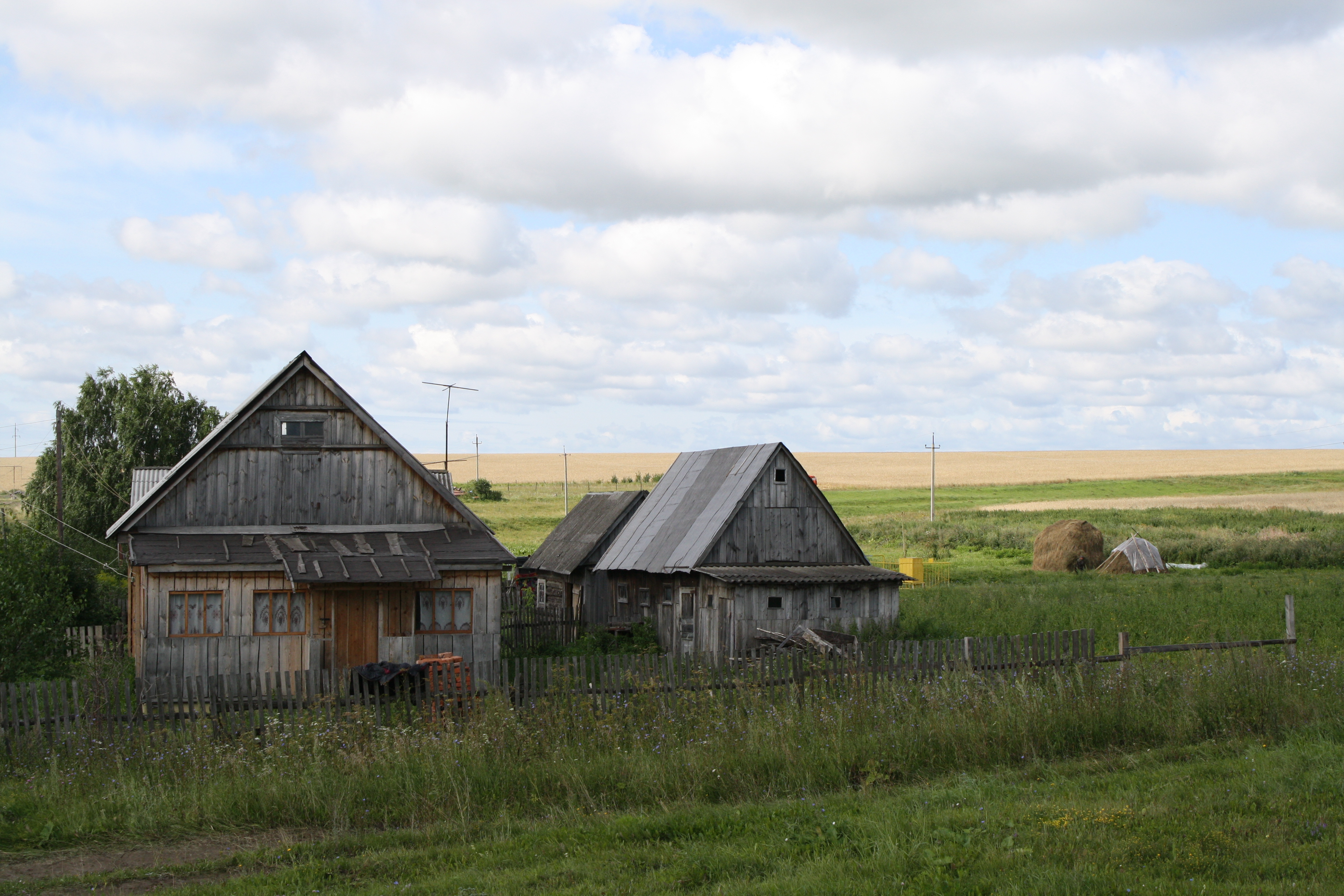
- Village in Mokshanksky District

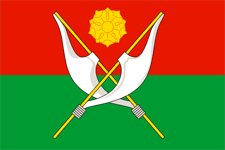
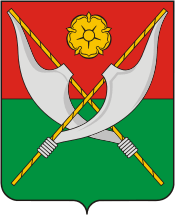
- Flag Coat of arms
- Location of Mokshansky District in Penza Oblast
- Coordinates: 53°26′23″N 44°36′38″E
- Country: Russia
- Federal subject: Penza Oblast
- Established: 16 July 1928
- Administrative center: Mokshan

Area
  - Total: 2,200 km^{2} (850 sq mi)

Population (2010 Census)
  - Total: 28,033
  - Density: 13/km^{2} (33/sq mi)
  - Urban: 41.4%
  - Rural: 58.6%

Administrative structure
  - Administrative divisions: 1 Work settlements, 12 Selsoviets
  - Inhabited localities: 1 urban-type settlements, 94 rural localities

Municipal structure
  - Municipally incorporated as: Mokshansky Municipal District
  - Municipal divisions: 1 urban settlements, 12 rural settlements
- Time zone: UTC+3 (MSK)
- OKTMO ID: 56645000
- Website: http://rmoksh.pnzreg.ru/

Mokshansky District (Russian: Мокша́нский райо́н) is an administrative and municipal district (raion), one of the twenty-seven in Penza Oblast, Russia. It is located in the north of the oblast. The area of the district is 2,200 square kilometers (850 sq mi). Its administrative center is the urban locality (a work settlement) of Mokshan. Population: 28,033 (2010 Census); 30,929 (2002 census); 33,008 (1989 Soviet census). The population of Mokshan accounts for 41.4% of the district's total population.
