= Issinsky District =

Issinsky District Иссинский район
- District
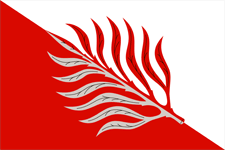
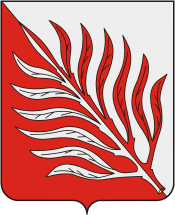
- Flag Coat of arms
- Location of Issinsky District in Penza Oblast
- Coordinates: 53°52′03″N 44°51′34″E
- Country: Russia
- Federal subject: Penza Oblast
- Established: 16 July 1928
- Administrative center: Issa

Area
  - Total: 926.3 km^{2} (357.6 sq mi)

Population (2010 Census)
  - Total: 11,157
  - Density: 12.04/km^{2} (31.20/sq mi)
  - Urban: 48.6%
  - Rural: 51.4%

Administrative structure
  - Administrative divisions: 1 Work settlements, 5 Selsoviets
  - Inhabited localities: 1 urban-type settlements, 40 rural localities

Municipal structure
  - Municipally incorporated as: Issinsky Municipal District
  - Municipal divisions: 1 urban settlements, 5 rural settlements
- Time zone: UTC+3 (MSK)
- OKTMO ID: 56626000
- Website: http://rissa.pnzreg.ru/

Issinsky District (Russian: Иссинский райо́н) is an administrative and municipal district (raion), one of the twenty-seven in Penza Oblast, Russia. It is located in the north of the oblast. The area of the district is 926.3 square kilometers (357.6 sq mi). Its administrative center is the urban locality (a work settlement) of Issa. Population: 11,157 (2010 Census); 12,611 (2002 Census); 14,746 (1989 Soviet census). The population of Issa accounts for 48.6% of the district's total population.

== Notable residents ==
- Filipp Cherokmanov (1899–1978), Soviet Army lieutenant general, Hero of the Soviet Union, born in the village of Marovka
