= Rodnikovsky, Novoanninsky District, Volgograd Oblast =

Rodnikovsky Родниковский
- Khutor
- Location within Volgograd Oblast Location within Russia
- Coordinates: 50°29′N 42°35′E
- Country: Russia
- Region: Volgograd Oblast
- District: Novoanninsky District
- Time zone: UTC+4:00

Rodnikovsky (Russian: Родниковский) is a rural locality (a khutor) in Staroanninskoye Rural Settlement, Novoanninsky District, Volgograd Oblast, Russia. The population was 139 as of 2010. There are 3 streets.

== Geography ==
Rodnikovsky is located 11 km southwest of Novoanninsky (the district's administrative centre) by road. Vesyoly is the nearest rural locality.
