= Kameshkirsky District =

Kameshkirsky District Камешкирский район (Russian)
- District
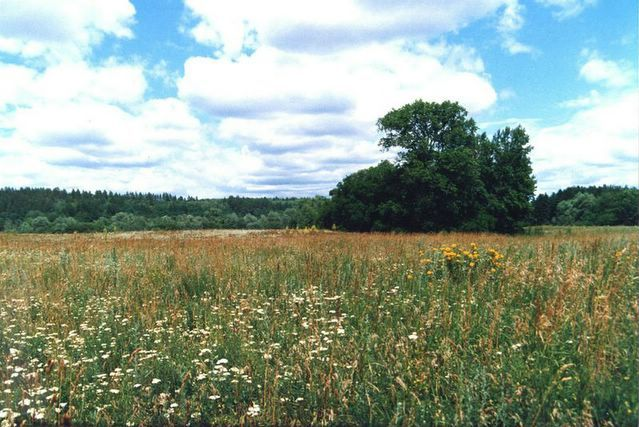
- Privolzhskaya lesostep Nature Reserve, Kameshkirsky District

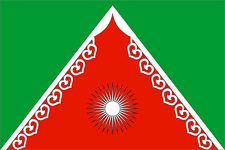
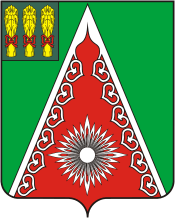
- Flag Coat of arms
- Location of Kameshkirsky District in Penza Oblast
- Coordinates: 52°51′57″N 46°05′36″E
- Country: Russia
- Federal subject: Penza Oblast
- Established: 16 July 1928
- Administrative center: Russky Kameshkir

Area
  - Total: 1,270 km^{2} (490 sq mi)

Population (2010 Census)
  - Total: 12,802
  - Density: 10.1/km^{2} (26.1/sq mi)
  - Urban: 0%
  - Rural: 100%

Administrative structure
  - Administrative divisions: 6 selsoviet
  - Inhabited localities: 28 rural localities

Municipal structure
  - Municipally incorporated as: Kameshkirsky Municipal District
  - Municipal divisions: 0 urban settlements, 6 rural settlements
- Time zone: UTC+3 (MSK)
- OKTMO ID: 56631000
- Website: http://rkam.pnzreg.ru/

Kameshkirsky District (Russian: Камешкирский райо́н) is an administrative and municipal district (raion), one of the twenty-seven in Penza Oblast, Russia. It is located in the southeast of the oblast. The area of the district is 1,270 square kilometers (490 sq mi). Its administrative center is the rural locality (a selo) of Russky Kameshkir. Population: 12,802 (2010 Census); 14,404 (2002 census); 16,733 (1989 Soviet census). The population of Russky Kameshkir accounts for 41.9% of the district's total population.
