= Yagodnoye, Republic of Buryatia =

Yagodnoye Ягодное
- Selo
- Location within Republic of Buryatia Location within Russia
- Coordinates: 51°24′N 106°30′E
- Country: Russia
- Region: Republic of Buryatia
- District: Selenginsky District
- Time zone: UTC+8:00

Yagodnoye (Russian: Ягодное) is a rural locality (a selo) in Selenginsky District, Republic of Buryatia, Russia. The population was 320 as of 2010. There are 5 streets.

== Geography ==
Yagodnoye is located 23 km north of Gusinoozyorsk (the district's administrative centre) by road. Tokhoy is the nearest rural locality.
