= Yagodnaya, Republic of Bashkortostan =

Yagodnaya Ягодная
- Village
- Location within Bashkortostan Location within Russia
- Coordinates: 54°47′N 56°26′E
- Country: Russia
- Region: Bashkortostan
- District: Iglinsky District
- Time zone: UTC+5:00

Yagodnaya (Russian: Ягодная; Bashkir: Еләкле, Yeläkle) is a rural locality (a village) in Iglinsky Selsoviet, Iglinsky District, Bashkortostan, Russia. The population was 471 as of 2010. There are 10 streets.

== Geography ==
Yagodnaya is located 5 km south of Iglino (the district's administrative centre) by road. Iglino is the nearest rural locality.
