= Mokshan =

Mokshan Мокшан
- Urban-type settlement
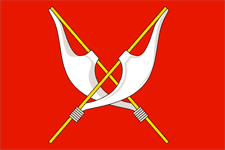
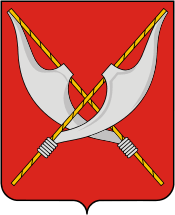
- Flag Coat of arms
- Interactive map of Mokshan
- Location of Mokshan Mokshan (Penza Oblast)
- Coordinates: 53°26′23″N 44°36′38″E
- Country: Russia
- Federal subject: Penza Oblast
- Administrative district: Mokshansky District
- Founded: 1566 (Julian)

Population (2010 Census)
  - Total: 11,592
  - Estimate (2021): 10,997 (−5.1%)
- Time zone: UTC+3 (MSK)
- Postal code: 442370
- OKTMO ID: 56645151051

Mokshan (Russian: Мокша́н) is an urban locality (a work settlement) and the administrative center of Mokshansky District of Penza Oblast, Russia. Population: 11,592 (2010 census); 11,808 (2002 census); 11,035 (1989 Soviet census); 10,710 (1900).
