= Yagodina, Perm Krai =

Yagodina Ягодина
- Village
- Location within Perm Krai Location within Russia
- Coordinates: 59°07′N 54°37′E
- Country: Russia
- Region: Perm Krai
- District: Kudymkarsky District
- Time zone: UTC+5:00

Yagodina (Russian: Ягодина) is a rural locality (a village) in Yorgvinskoye Rural Settlement, Kudymkarsky District, Perm Krai, Russia. The population was 43 as of 2010.

== Geography ==
Yagodina is located 21 km north of Kudymkar (the district's administrative centre) by road. Pronina is the nearest rural locality.
