= Nizhnelomovsky District =

Nizhnelomovsky District Нижнеломовский район (Russian)
- District
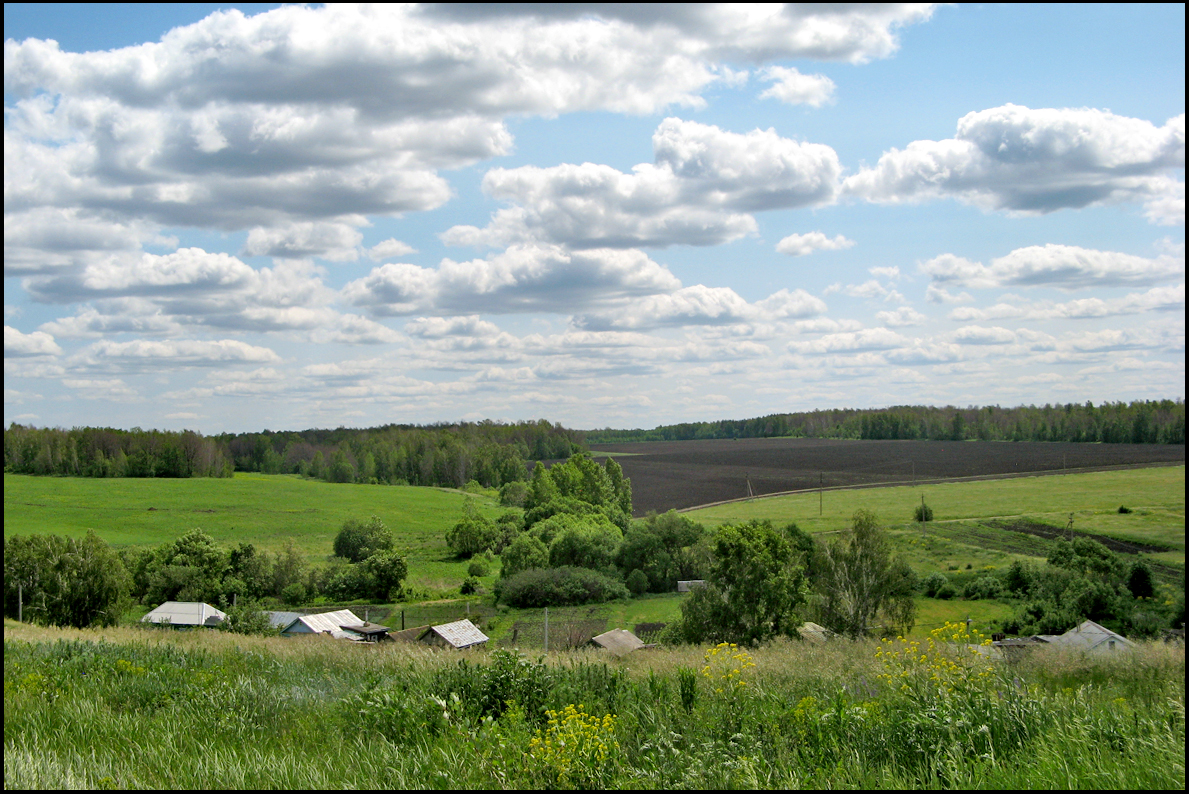
- Landscape in Nizhnelomovsky District

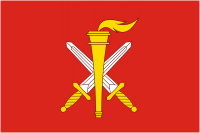
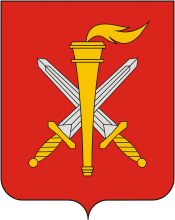
- Flag Coat of arms
- Location of Nizhnelomovsky District in Penza Oblast
- Coordinates: 53°32′N 43°41′E
- Country: Russia
- Federal subject: Penza Oblast
- Administrative center: Nizhny Lomov

Area
  - Total: 1,760 km^{2} (680 sq mi)

Population (2010 Census)
  - Total: 41,974
  - Density: 23.8/km^{2} (61.8/sq mi)
  - Urban: 54.0%
  - Rural: 46.0%

Administrative structure
  - Administrative divisions: 1 Towns of district significance, 10 Selsoviets
  - Inhabited localities: 1 cities/towns, 63 rural localities

Municipal structure
  - Municipally incorporated as: Nizhnelomovsky Municipal District
  - Municipal divisions: 1 urban settlements, 10 rural settlements
- Time zone: UTC+3 (MSK)
- OKTMO ID: 56651000
- Website: http://rnlomov.pnzreg.ru/

Nizhnelomovsky District (Russian: Нижнело́мовский райо́н) is an administrative and municipal district (raion), one of the twenty-seven in Penza Oblast, Russia. It is located in the northwest of the oblast. The area of the district is 1,760 square kilometers (680 sq mi). Its administrative center is the town of Nizhny Lomov. Population: 41,974 (2010 Census); 46,540 (2002 census); 25,510 (1989 Soviet census). The population of Nizhny Lomov accounts for 54.0% of the district's total population.
