= Sura, Penza Oblast =

Sura Сура
- Urban-type settlement
- Interactive map of Sura
- Location of Sura Sura (Penza Oblast)
- Coordinates: 53.8879°N 45.7539°E
- Country: Russia
- Federal subject: Penza Oblast
- Administrative district: Nikolsky District
- Founded: 1898

Population (2010 Census)
  - Total: 2,125
  - Estimate (2021): 1,614 (−24%)
- Time zone: UTC+3 (MSK)
- Postal code: 442650
- OKTMO ID: 56653155051

Sura (Russian: Сура́) is an urban locality (an urban-type settlement) in Nikolsky District of Penza Oblast, Russia. Population: 2,125 (2010 census); 2,305 (2002 census); 2,621 (1989 Soviet census).
