= Shemysheysky District =

Shemysheysky District Шемышейский район (Russian)
- District
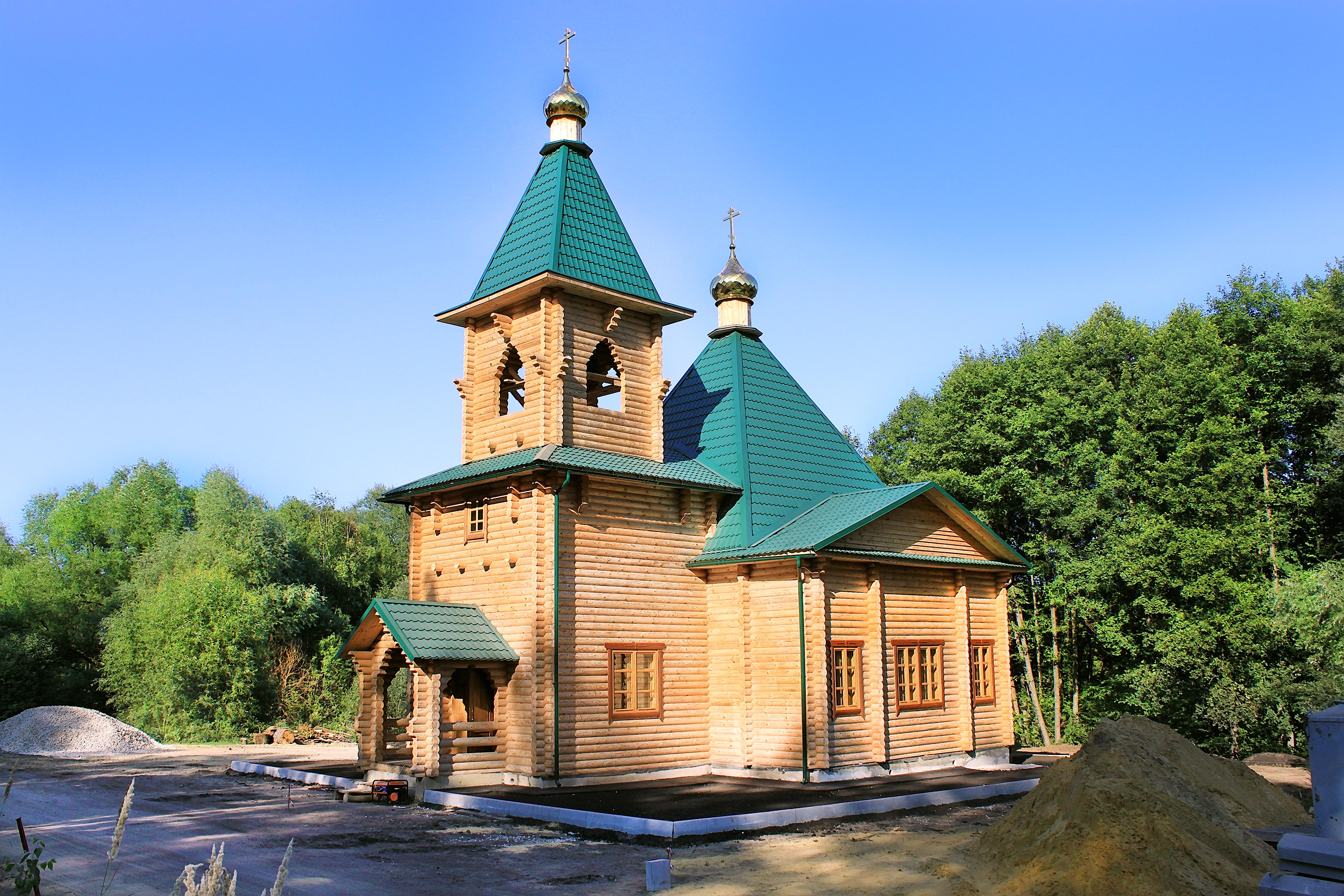
- Semiklyuche, Shemysheysky District

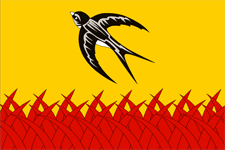
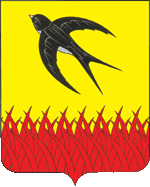
- Flag Coat of arms
- Location of Shemysheysky District in Penza Oblast
- Coordinates: 52°53′30″N 45°23′30″E
- Country: Russia
- Federal subject: Penza Oblast
- Established: 16 July 1928
- Administrative center: Shemysheyka

Area
  - Total: 1,688 km^{2} (652 sq mi)

Population (2010 Census)
  - Total: 17,661
  - Density: 10.46/km^{2} (27.10/sq mi)
  - Urban: 36.9%
  - Rural: 63.1%

Administrative structure
  - Administrative divisions: 1 Work settlements, 12 Selsoviets
  - Inhabited localities: 1 urban-type settlements, 38 rural localities

Municipal structure
  - Municipally incorporated as: Shemysheysky Municipal District
  - Municipal divisions: 1 urban settlements, 12 rural settlements
- Time zone: UTC+3 (MSK)
- OKTMO ID: 56659000
- Website: http://rshem.pnzreg.ru/

Shemysheysky District (Russian: Шемыше́йский райо́н) is an administrative and municipal district (raion), one of the twenty-seven in Penza Oblast, Russia. It is located in the southeastern central part of the oblast. The area of the district is 1,688 square kilometers (652 sq mi). Its administrative center is the urban locality (a work settlement) of Shemysheyka. Population: 17,661 (2010 Census); 19,063 (2002 census); 22,714 (1989 Soviet census). The population of Shemysheyka accounts for 36.9% of the district's total population.
