= Yagodnoye, Volgograd Oblast =

Yagodnoye Ягодное
- Selo
- Location within Volgograd Oblast Location within Russia
- Coordinates: 49°45′N 44°45′E
- Country: Russia
- Region: Volgograd Oblast
- District: Olkhovsky District
- Time zone: UTC+4:00

Yagodnoye (Russian: Я́годное) is a rural locality (a selo) and the administrative center of Yagodnovskoye Rural Settlement, Olkhovsky District, Volgograd Oblast, Russia. The population was 735 as of 2010. There are 10 streets.

== Geography ==
Yagodnoye is located in steppe, on the Volga Upland, 22 km southeast of Olkhovka (the district's administrative centre) by road. Lipovka is the nearest rural locality.
