= Yagodny, Rudnyansky District, Volgograd Oblast =

Yagodny Ягодный
- Khutor
- Location within Volgograd Oblast Location within Russia
- Coordinates: 50°57′N 44°24′E
- Country: Russia
- Region: Volgograd Oblast
- District: Rudnyansky District
- Time zone: UTC+4:00

Yagodny (Russian: Ягодный) is a rural locality (a khutor) in Osichkovskoye Rural Settlement, Rudnyansky District, Volgograd Oblast, Russia. The population was 62 as of 2010.

== Geography ==
Yagodny is located 27 km northwest of Rudnya (the district's administrative centre) by road. Kozlovka is the nearest rural locality.
