= Gorodishche, Gorodishchensky District, Penza Oblast =

Town in Penza Oblast, Russia

Gorodishche Городище
- Town
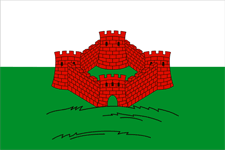
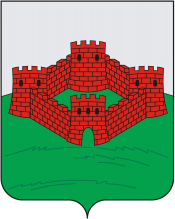
- Flag Coat of arms
- Interactive map of Gorodishche
- Location of Gorodishche Gorodishche (Penza Oblast)
- Coordinates: 53°17′N 45°42′E
- Country: Russia
- Federal subject: Penza Oblast
- Administrative district: Gorodishchensky District
- Town of district significanceSelsoviet: Gorodishche
- Founded: 1681
- Town status since: 1780
- Elevation: 210 m (690 ft)

Population (2010 Census)
  - Total: 8,096
  - Estimate (2021): 7,796 (−3.7%)

Administrative status
  - Capital of: Gorodishchensky District, town of district significance of Gorodishche

Municipal status
  - Municipal district: Gorodishchensky Municipal District
  - Urban settlement: Gorodishche Urban Settlement
  - Capital of: Gorodishchensky Municipal District, Gorodishche Urban Settlement
- Time zone: UTC+3 (MSK)
- Postal code: 442310
- OKTMO ID: 56618101001

Gorodishche (Russian: Городи́ще) is a town and the administrative center of Gorodishchensky District in Penza Oblast, Russia, located on the Yulovka River (Sura's tributary) 48 kilometers (30 mi) east of Penza, the administrative center of the oblast. According to the 2010 census, it had a population of 8096.

== History ==
It was founded in 1681 as a fortress; town status was granted to it in 1780.

== Administrative and municipal status ==
Within the framework of administrative divisions, Gorodishche serves as the administrative center of Gorodishchensky District. As an administrative division, it is incorporated within Gorodishchensky District as the town of district significance of Gorodishche. As a municipal division, the town of district significance of Gorodishche is incorporated within Gorodishchensky Municipal District as Gorodishche Urban Settlement.

== Notable residents ==
- Ivan Smirnov (1881–1936), Bolshevik revolutionary, Soviet politician and Communist Party functionary
