= Ulyanovka, Karmaskalinsky District, Republic of Bashkortostan =

Ulyanovka Ульяновка
- Village
- Location within Bashkortostan Location within Russia
- Coordinates: 54°26′N 56°08′E
- Country: Russia
- Region: Bashkortostan
- District: Karmaskalinsky District
- Time zone: UTC+5:00

Ulyanovka (Russian: Ульяновка) is a rural locality (a village) in Nikolayevsky Selsoviet, Karmaskalinsky District, Bashkortostan, Russia. The population was 100 as of 2010. There is 1 street.

== Geography ==
Ulyanovka is located 10 km north of Karmaskaly (the district's administrative centre) by road. Nikolayevka is the nearest rural locality.
