= Ulyanovka, Belgorod Oblast =

Ulyanovka Ульяновка
- Khutor
- Location within Belgorod Oblast Location within Russia
- Coordinates: 50°22′N 37°51′E
- Country: Russia
- Region: Belgorod Oblast
- District: Volokonovsky District
- Time zone: UTC+3:00

Ulyanovka (Russian: Ульяновка) is a rural locality (a khutor) in Volokonovsky District, Belgorod Oblast, Russia. The population was 66 as of 2010. There are 2 streets.

== Geography ==
Ulyanovka is located 14 km south of Volokonovka (the district's administrative centre) by road. Vetchininovo is the nearest rural locality.
