= Ulyanovka, Zabaykalsky Krai =

Ulyanovka Ульяновка
- Selo
- Location within Zabaykalsky Krai Location within Russia
- Coordinates: 52°03′N 115°47′E
- Country: Russia
- Region: Zabaykalsky Krai
- District: Shilkinsky District
- Time zone: UTC+9:00

Ulyanovka (Russian: Ульяновка) is a rural locality (a selo) in Shilkinsky District, Zabaykalsky Krai, Russia. Population: 125 (2021 census); 169 (2010 census); There are 4 streets in this selo.

== Geography ==
This rural locality is located 29 km from Shilka (the district's administrative centre), 157 km from Chita (capital of Zabaykalsky Krai) and 5,360 km from Moscow. Verkhnyaya Khila is the nearest rural locality.
