= Dmitry Kadenkov =

Russian politician

- Дмитрий Каденков

Deputy of the 8th State Duma
- Incumbent
- Assumed office 19 September 2021

Personal details
- Born: 3 May 1972 (age 54) Penza, Russian Soviet Federative Socialist Republic, USSR
- Party: United Russia
- Education: Penza State Pedagogical University Named After VG Belinsky

Dmitry Kadenkov (Russian: Дмитрий Михайлович Каденков; born 3 May 1972, Penza) is a Russian political figure and deputy of the 8th State Duma. In 2003 Kadenkov was awarded a Doctor of Sciences in Pedagogy degree.

Kadenkov is a professional trainer. In 2003 he was appointed acting deputy to the Chairman of the Committee of the Penza Oblast on physical culture, sports and tourism. The same year he served as an assistant to the Governor of Penza Oblast Vasily Bochkaryov. From July 2009 to September 2021, he was the Chief Federal Inspector for the Penza Oblast of the Office of the Plenipotentiary Representative of the President of the Russian Federation in the Volga Federal District. He left the post to become deputy of the 8th State Duma.

== Sanctions ==
He was sanctioned by Canada under the Special Economic Measures Act (S.C. 1992, c. 17) in relation to the Russian invasion of Ukraine for Grave Breach of International Peace and Security, and by the UK government in 2022 in relation to Russo-Ukrainian War.

He is one of the members of the State Duma the United States Treasury sanctioned on 24 March 2022 in response to the 2022 Russian invasion of Ukraine.

== Awards ==
- Order "For Merit to the Fatherland"
