= Shemysheyka =

Shemysheyka Шемышейка
- Urban-type settlement
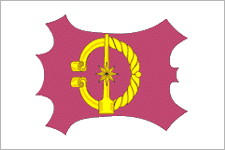
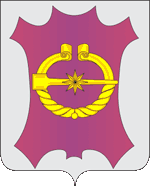
- Flag Coat of arms
- Interactive map of Shemysheyka
- Location of Shemysheyka Shemysheyka (Penza Oblast)
- Coordinates: 52.8939°N 45.3930°E
- Country: Russia
- Federal subject: Penza Oblast
- Administrative district: Shemysheysky District

Population (2010 Census)
  - Total: 6,512
  - Estimate (2021): 6,368 (−2.2%)
- Time zone: UTC+3 (MSK)
- Postal code: 442430
- OKTMO ID: 56659151051

Shemysheyka (Russian: Шемыше́йка) is an urban locality (an urban-type settlement) in Shemysheysky District of Penza Oblast, Russia. Population: 6,512 (2010 census); 6,708 (2002 census); 6,806 (1989 Soviet census).
