= Ulyanovka, Kuyurgazinsky District, Republic of Bashkortostan =

Ulyanovka Ульяновка
- Village
- Location within Bashkortostan Location within Russia
- Coordinates: 52°53′N 55°30′E
- Country: Russia
- Region: Bashkortostan
- District: Kuyurgazinsky District
- Time zone: UTC+5:00

Ulyanovka (Russian: Ульяновка) is a rural locality (a village) in Taymasovsky Selsoviet, Kuyurgazinsky District, Bashkortostan, Russia. The population was 9 as of 2010. There is 1 street.

== Geography ==
Ulyanovka is located 47 km northwest of Yermolayevo (the district's administrative centre) by road. Taymasovo is the nearest rural locality.
