= Yagodnaya, Vologda Oblast =

Yagodnaya Ягодная
- Village
- Location within Vologda Oblast Location within Russia
- Coordinates: 59°30′N 38°01′E
- Country: Russia
- Region: Vologda Oblast
- District: Cherepovetsky District
- Time zone: UTC+3:00

Yagodnaya (Russian: Ягодная) is a rural locality (a village) in Voskresenskoye Rural Settlement, Cherepovetsky District, Vologda Oblast, Russia. The population was 2 as of 2002.

== Geography ==
Yagodnaya is located 50 km northeast of Cherepovets (the district's administrative centre) by road. Titovo is the nearest rural locality.
