= Nizhny Lomov =

Town in Penza Oblast, Russia

Nizhny Lomov Нижний Ломов
- Town
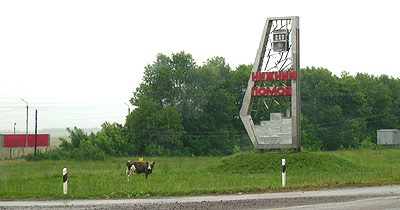
- Welcome sign at the entrance to Nizhny Lomov

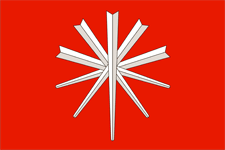
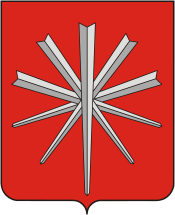
- Flag Coat of arms
- Interactive map of Nizhny Lomov
- Location of Nizhny Lomov Nizhny Lomov (Penza Oblast)
- Coordinates: 53°31′N 43°40′E
- Country: Russia
- Federal subject: Penza Oblast
- Administrative district: Nizhnelomovsky District
- Town of district significanceSelsoviet: Nizhny Lomov
- Founded: 1636
- Town status since: 1780
- Elevation: 170 m (560 ft)

Population (2010 Census)
  - Total: 22,678
  - Estimate (2021): 20,421 (−10%)

Administrative status
  - Capital of: Nizhnelomovsky District, town of district significance of Nizhny Lomov

Municipal status
  - Municipal district: Nizhnelomovsky Municipal District
  - Urban settlement: Nizhny Lomov Urban Settlement
  - Capital of: Nizhnelomovsky Municipal District, Nikolsk Urban Settlement
- Time zone: UTC+3 (MSK)
- Postal codes: 442150–442153, 442169
- OKTMO ID: 56651101001
- Website: gnlomov.nlomov.pnzreg.ru

Nizhny Lomov (Russian: Ни́жний Ломо́в) is a town and the administrative center of Nizhnelomovsky District in Penza Oblast, Russia, located on the Lomov River (Oka's basin), on the M5 Highway 109 kilometers (68 mi) northwest of Penza, the administrative center of the oblast. Population: 22,678 (2010 census); 24,249 (2002 census); 26,648 (1989 Soviet census).

== History ==
It was founded as an outpost in 1636 as part of the Belgorod Line defense system. It was later known as Lomovskaya sloboda, Lomovsky posad, and the village of Nizhny Lomov. Town status was granted to it in 1780.

== Administrative and municipal status ==
Within the framework of administrative divisions, Nizhny Lomov serves as the administrative center of Nizhnelomovsky District. As an administrative division, it is incorporated within Nizhnelomovsky District as the town of district significance of Nizhny Lomov. As a municipal division, the town of district significance of Nizhny Lomov is incorporated within Nizhnelomovsky Municipal District as Nizhny Lomov Urban Settlement.
