= Verkhozim =

Verkhozim Верхозим
- Urban-type settlement
- Interactive map of Verkhozim
- Location of Verkhozim Verkhozim (Penza Oblast)
- Coordinates: 52.9129°N 46.3673°E
- Country: Russia
- Federal subject: Penza Oblast
- Administrative district: Kuznetsky District

Population (2010 Census)
  - Total: 1,785
  - Estimate (2021): 1,504 (−15.7%)
- Time zone: UTC+3 (MSK)
- Postal code: 442516
- OKTMO ID: 56640154051

Verkhozim (Russian: Верхозим) is an urban locality (an urban-type settlement) in Kuznetsky District of Penza Oblast, Russia. Population: 1,785 (2010 census); 1,779 (2002 census); 1,886 (1989 Soviet census).
