= Tamalinsky District =

Tamalinsky District Тамалинский район (Russian)
- District
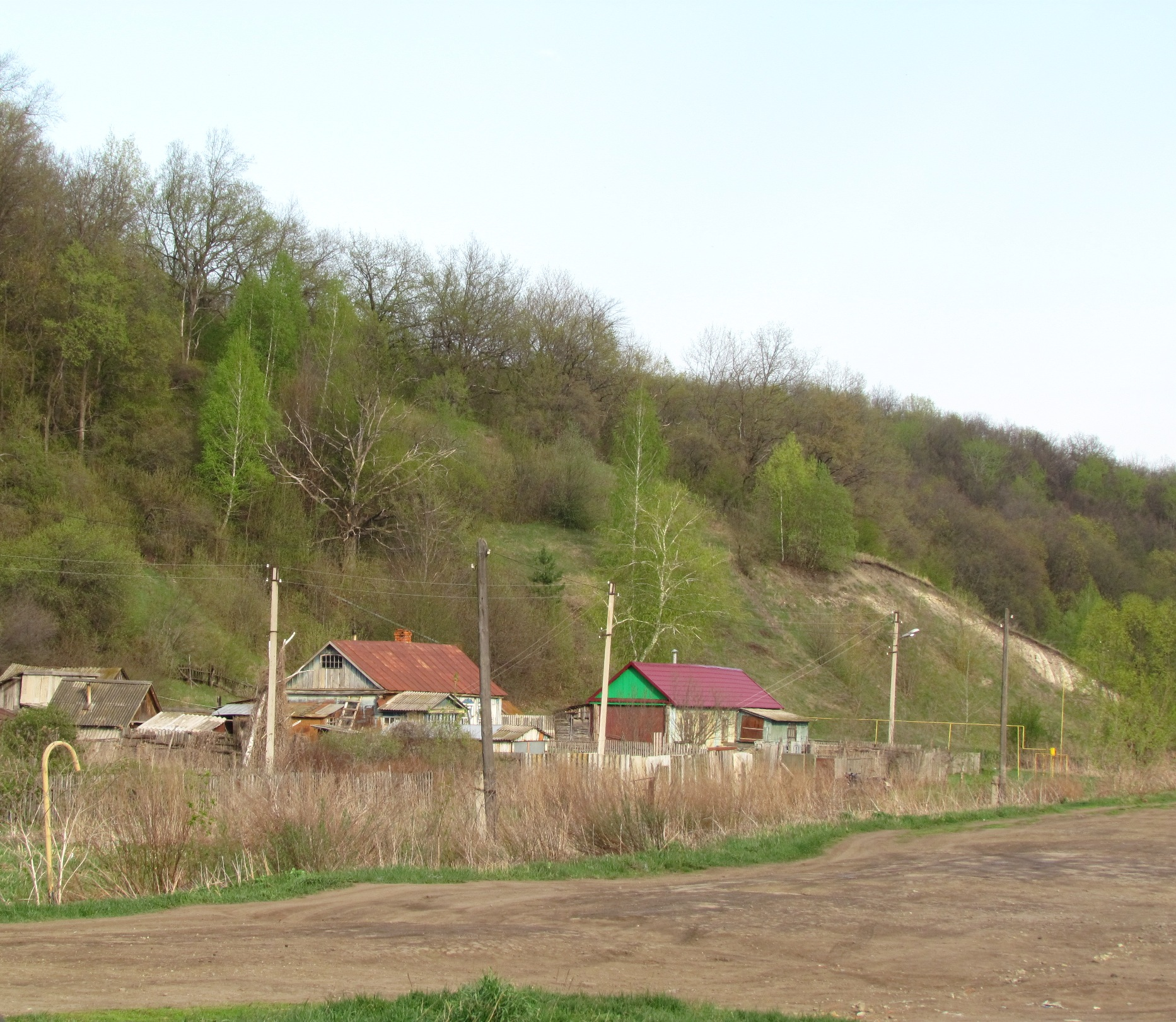
- The selo of Zubrilovo in Tamalinsky District

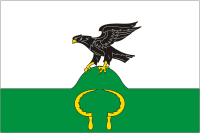
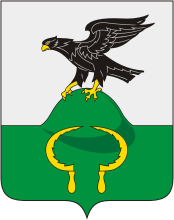
- Flag Coat of arms
- Location of Tamalinsky District in Penza Oblast
- Coordinates: 52°32′30″N 43°15′00″E
- Country: Russia
- Federal subject: Penza Oblast
- Administrative center: Tamala

Area
  - Total: 1,236 km^{2} (477 sq mi)

Population (2010 Census)
  - Total: 16,503
  - Density: 13.35/km^{2} (34.58/sq mi)
  - Urban: 45.3%
  - Rural: 54.7%

Administrative structure
  - Administrative divisions: 1 Work settlements, 5 Selsoviets
  - Inhabited localities: 1 urban-type settlements, 57 rural localities

Municipal structure
  - Municipally incorporated as: Tamalinsky Municipal District
  - Municipal divisions: 1 urban settlements, 5 rural settlements
- Time zone: UTC+3 (MSK)
- OKTMO ID: 56658000
- Website: http://rtamala.pnzreg.ru/

Tamalinsky District (Russian: Тамали́нский райо́н) is an administrative and municipal district (raion), one of the twenty-seven in Penza Oblast, Russia. It is located in the southwest of the oblast. The area of the district is 1,236 square kilometers (477 sq mi). Its administrative center is the urban locality (a work settlement) of Tamala. Population: 16,503 (2010 Census); 19,083 (2002 census); 21,289 (1989 Soviet census). The population of Tamala accounts for 45.3% of the district's total population.

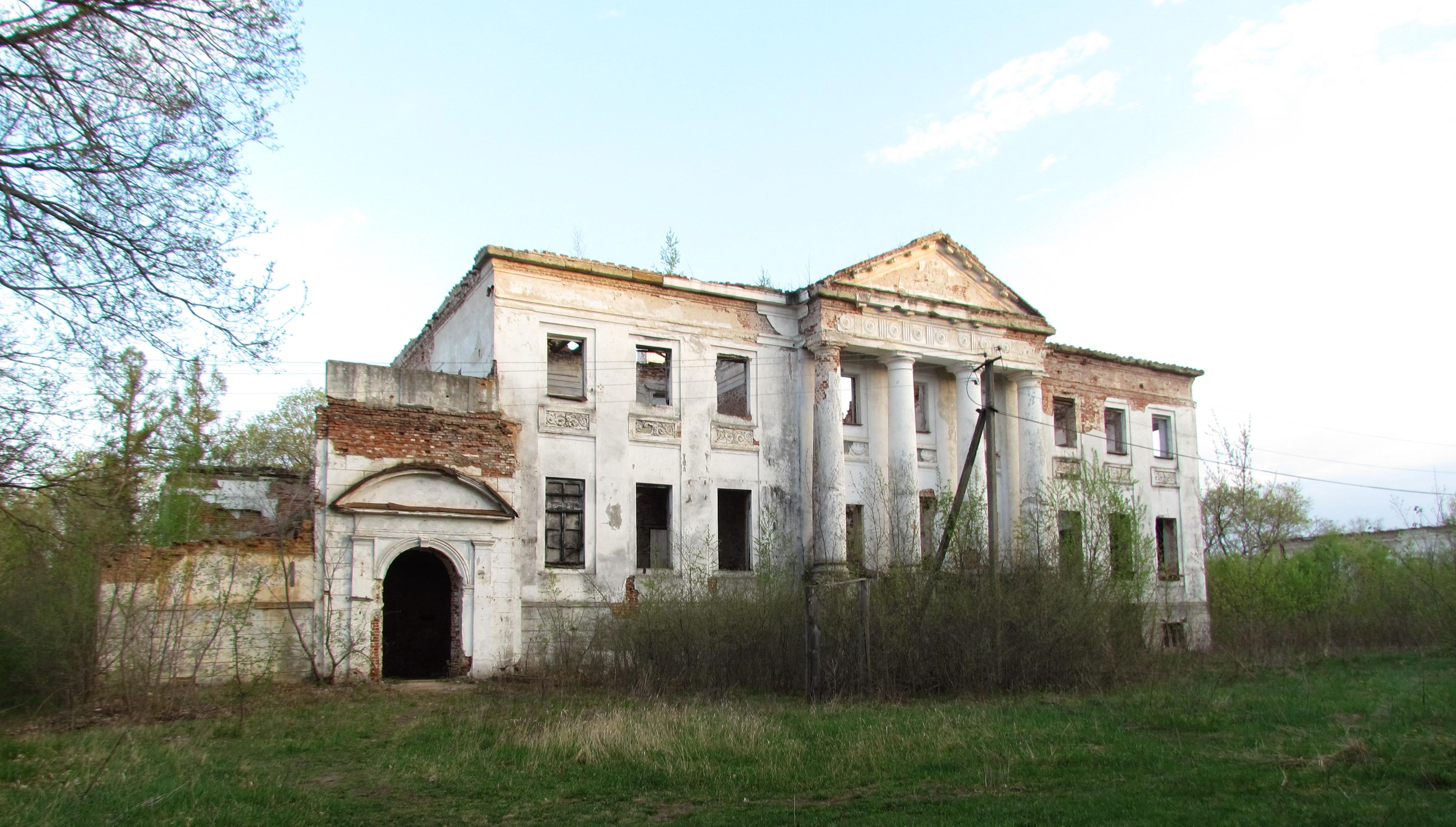
Palace of Estate of princes Prozorovskiy-Golitzyns (Zubrilovka Estate)

== Notable residents ==
- Nikolai Krylov (1903–1972), Marshal of the Soviet Union
- Aleksei Makushkin (born 1997 in Tamala), football player
