= Issa, Penza Oblast =

Issa Исса
- Urban-type settlement
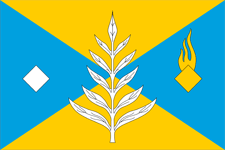
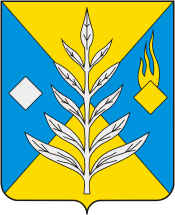
- Flag Coat of arms
- Interactive map of Issa
- Location of Issa Issa (Penza Oblast)
- Coordinates: 53.8656°N 44.8395°E
- Country: Russia
- Federal subject: Penza Oblast
- Administrative district: Issinsky District

Population (2010 Census)
  - Total: 5,418
  - Estimate (2021): 4,917 (−9.2%)
- Time zone: UTC+3 (MSK)
- Postal code: 442710
- OKTMO ID: 56626151051

Issa (Russian: И́сса) is an urban locality (an urban-type settlement) in Issinsky District of Penza Oblast, Russia. Population: 5,418 (2010 census); 5,606 (2002 census); 5,907 (1989 Soviet census).
