= Ulyanovka, Perm Krai =

Ulyanovka Ульяновка
- Village
- Location within Perm Krai Location within Russia
- Coordinates: 56°30′N 56°02′E
- Country: Russia
- Region: Perm Krai
- District: Chernushinsky District
- Time zone: UTC+5:00

Ulyanovka (Russian: Ульяновка) is a rural locality (a village) in Chernushinsky District, Perm Krai, Russia. The population was 244 as of 2010. There are 10 streets.

== Geography ==
Ulyanovka is located 3 km southwest of Chernushka (the district's administrative centre) by road. Chernushka is the nearest rural locality.
