= Yagodny, Serafimovichsky District, Volgograd Oblast =

Yagodny Ягодный
- Khutor
- Location within Volgograd Oblast Location within Russia
- Coordinates: 49°28′N 42°04′E
- Country: Russia
- Region: Volgograd Oblast
- District: Serafimovichsky District
- Time zone: UTC+4:00

Yagodny (Russian: Ягодный) is a rural locality (a khutor) in Krutovskoye Rural Settlement, Serafimovichsky District, Volgograd Oblast, Russia. The population was 28 as of 2010.

== Geography ==
Yagodny is located on the left bank of the Krivaya River, 184 km west of Serafimovich (the district's administrative centre) by road. Nizhnekrivskoy is the nearest rural locality.
