= Yevlashevo =

Yevlashevo Евлашево
- Urban-type settlement
- Interactive map of Yevlashevo
- Location of Yevlashevo Yevlashevo (Penza Oblast)
- Coordinates: 53.1118°N 46.8344°E
- Country: Russia
- Federal subject: Penza Oblast
- Administrative district: Kuznetsky District
- Elevation: 341 m (1,119 ft)

Population (2010 Census)
  - Total: 5,013
  - Estimate (2021): 4,507 (−10.1%)
- Time zone: UTC+3 (MSK)
- Postal code: 442508
- OKTMO ID: 56640158051

Yevlashevo (Russian: Евла́шево) is an urban locality (an urban-type settlement) in Kuznetsky District of Penza Oblast, Russia. Population: 5,013 (2010 census); 4,648 (2002 census); 4,691 (1989 Soviet census).
