= Bashmakovo, Penza Oblast =

Bashmakovo Башмаково
- Work settlement
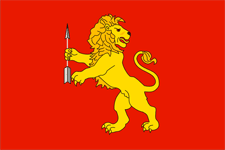
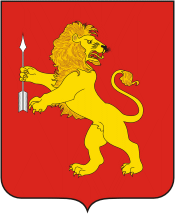
- Flag Coat of arms
- Interactive map of Bashmakovo
- Location of Bashmakovo Bashmakovo (Penza Oblast)
- Coordinates: 53°12′47″N 43°02′11″E
- Country: Russia
- Federal subject: Penza Oblast
- Administrative district: Bashmakovsky District
- Founded: 1875
- Elevation: 199 m (653 ft)

Population (2010 Census)
  - Total: 10,416
  - Estimate (2021): 9,414 (−9.6%)

Administrative status
  - Capital of: Bashmakovsky District
- Time zone: UTC+3 (MSK)
- Postal code: 442060
- OKTMO ID: 56603151051

Bashmakovo (Russian: Башмако́во) is an urban locality (a work settlement) and the administrative center of Bashmakovsky District of Penza Oblast, Russia, located 169 kilometers (105 mi) from Penza. Population: 10,416 (2010 census); 9,783 (2002 census); 9,935 (1989 Soviet census).

== History ==
Bashmakovo's history dates back to the villages of Kolesovka and Mikhaylovka established in the mid-18th century. Later, the two villages were merged and formed what now is Bashkmakovo. It was named in honor of Sergey Bashmakov, who was one of the leaders in the construction of the railway.

== Economy ==
Bashmakovo had been connected with Moscow by train since 1875. The inhabitants are mainly involved in the production and processing of agricultural products and produce oil and brine cheese.
