= Zemetchinsky District =

Zemetchinsky District Земетчинский район (Russian)
- District
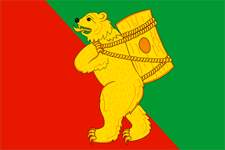
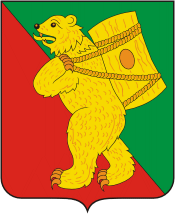
- Flag Coat of arms
- Location of Zemetchinsky District in Penza Oblast
- Coordinates: 53°29′N 42°36′E
- Country: Russia
- Federal subject: Penza Oblast
- Established: 16 July 1928
- Administrative center: Zemetchino

Area
  - Total: 2,103.2 km^{2} (812.1 sq mi)

Population (2010 Census)
  - Total: 24,674
  - Density: 11.732/km^{2} (30.385/sq mi)
  - Urban: 43.7%
  - Rural: 56.3%

Administrative structure
  - Administrative divisions: 1 Work settlements, 10 Selsoviets
  - Inhabited localities: 1 urban-type settlements, 63 rural localities

Municipal structure
  - Municipally incorporated as: Zemetchinsky Municipal District
  - Municipal divisions: 1 urban settlements, 10 rural settlements
- Time zone: UTC+3 (MSK)
- OKTMO ID: 56623000
- Website: http://rzemet.pnzreg.ru/

Zemetchinsky District (Russian: Земе́тчинский райо́н) is an administrative and municipal district (raion), one of the twenty-seven in Penza Oblast, Russia. It is located in the northwest of the oblast. The area of the district is 2,103.2 square kilometers (812.1 sq mi). Its administrative center is the urban locality (a work settlement) of Zemetchino. Population: 24,674 (2010 Census); 31,072 (2002 Census); 38,566 (1989 Soviet census). The population of Zemetchino accounts for 43.7% of the district's total population.
