= Zolotaryovka =

Zolotaryovka Золотарёвка
- Urban-type settlement
- Interactive map of Zolotaryovka
- Location of Zolotaryovka Zolotaryovka (Penza Oblast)
- Coordinates: 53.0741°N 45.3232°E
- Country: Russia
- Federal subject: Penza Oblast
- Administrative district: Penzensky District

Population (2010 Census)
  - Total: 2,630
  - Estimate (2021): 2,913 (+10.8%)
- Time zone: UTC+3 (MSK)
- Postal code: 440521
- OKTMO ID: 56655153051

Zolotaryovka (Russian: Золотарёвка) is an urban locality (an urban-type settlement) in Penzensky District of Penza Oblast, Russia. Population: 2,630 (2010 census); 2,898 (2002 census); 3,226 (1989 Soviet census).
