= Pachelma (urban-type settlement) =

Pachelma Пачелма
- Urban-type settlement
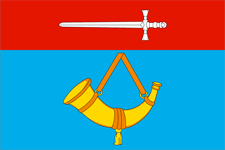
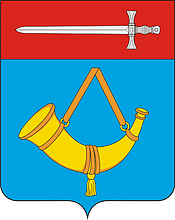
- Flag Coat of arms
- Interactive map of Pachelma
- Location of Pachelma Pachelma (Penza Oblast)
- Coordinates: 53.3268°N 43.3224°E
- Country: Russia
- Federal subject: Penza Oblast
- Administrative district: Pachelmsky District
- Founded: 1874

Population (2010 Census)
  - Total: 8,053
  - Estimate (2021): 6,994 (−13.2%)
- Time zone: UTC+3 (MSK)
- Postal code: 442100
- OKTMO ID: 56654151051

Pachelma (Russian: Пачелма) is an urban locality (an urban-type settlement) in Pachelmsky District of Penza Oblast, Russia. Population: 8,053 (2010 census); 8,735 (2002 census); 9,466 (1989 Soviet census).
