= Bashmakovsky District =

Bashmakovsky District Башмаковский район (Russian)
- District
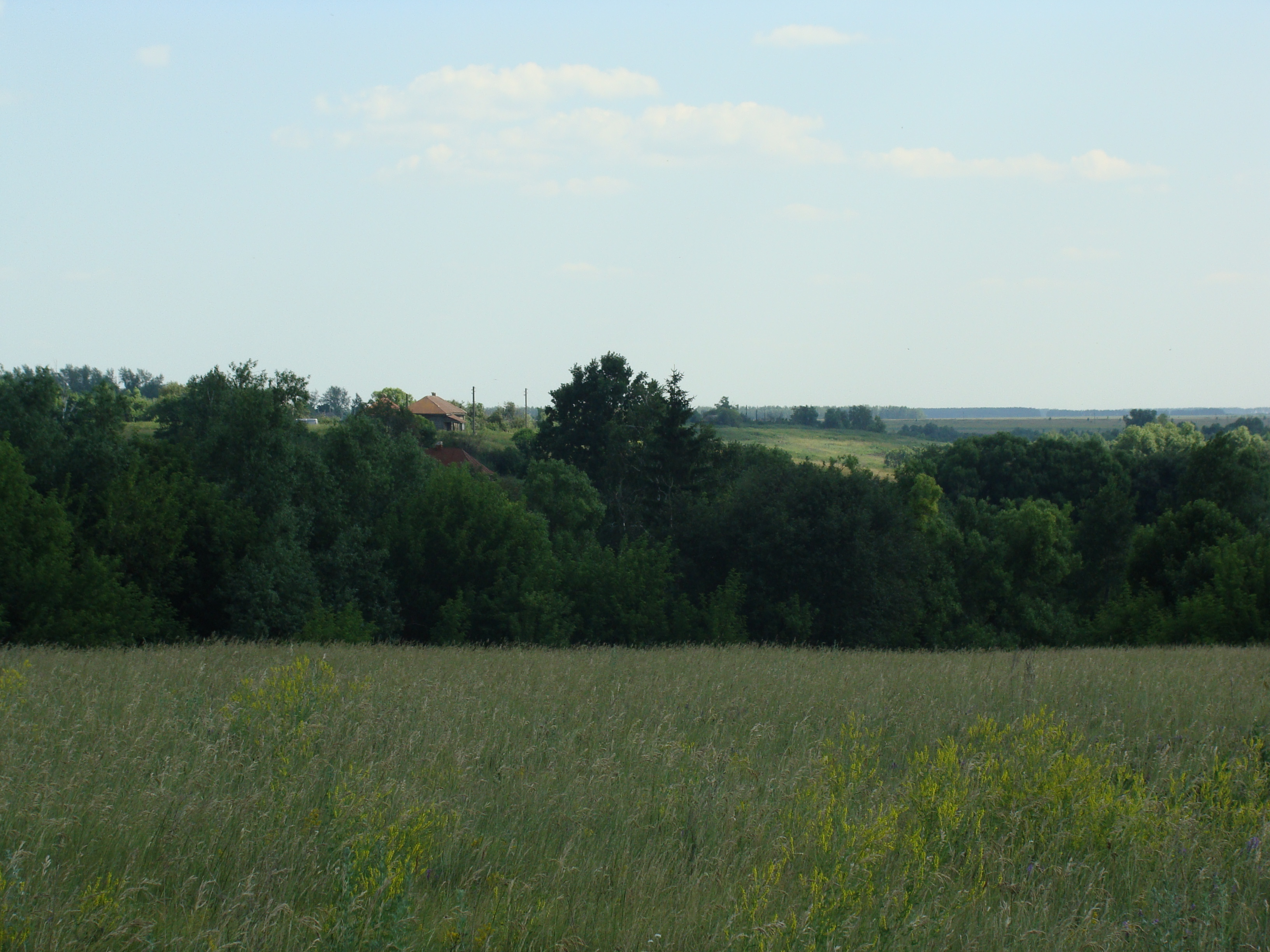
- Outside Kyanda, Bashmakovsky District

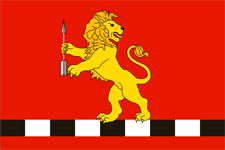
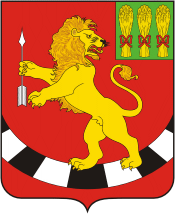
- Flag Coat of arms
- Location of Bashkmakovsky District in Penza Oblast
- Coordinates: 53°12′47″N 43°02′11″E
- Country: Russia
- Federal subject: Penza Oblast
- Administrative center: Bashmakovo

Area
  - Total: 1,618 km^{2} (625 sq mi)

Population (2010 Census)
  - Total: 23,304
  - Density: 14.40/km^{2} (37.30/sq mi)
  - Urban: 44.7%
  - Rural: 55.3%

Administrative structure
  - Administrative divisions: 1 Work settlements, 13 Selsoviets
  - Inhabited localities: 1 urban-type settlements, 59 rural localities

Municipal structure
  - Municipally incorporated as: Bashmakovsky Municipal District
  - Municipal divisions: 1 urban settlements, 13 rural settlements
- Time zone: UTC+3 (MSK)
- OKTMO ID: 56603000
- Website: http://rbash.pnzreg.ru/

Bashmakovsky District (Russian: Башмако́вский райо́н) is an administrative and municipal district (raion), one of the twenty-seven in Penza Oblast, Russia. It is located in the west of the oblast. The area of the district is 1,618 square kilometers (625 sq mi). Its administrative center is the urban locality (a work settlement) of Bashmakovo. Population: 23,304 (2010 Census); 25,159 (2002 census); 28,032 (1989 Soviet census). The population of Bashmakovo accounts for 44.7% of the district's total population.

== Notable residents ==
- Anna Konkina (born 1947 in Kirillovka), racing cyclist
