= Pachelmsky District =

Pachelmsky District Пачелмский район (Russian)
- District
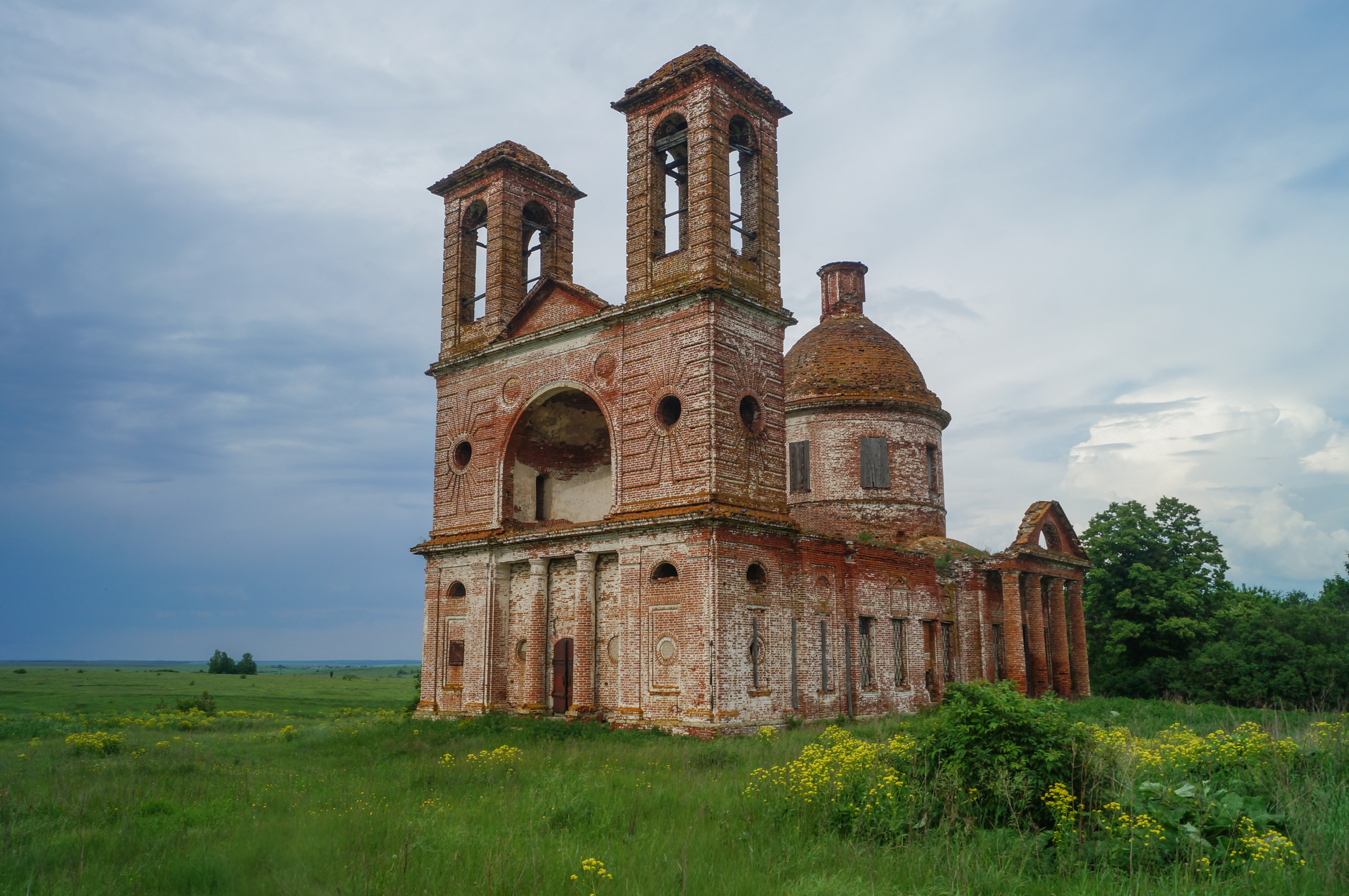
- Abandoned church, Pachelmsky District

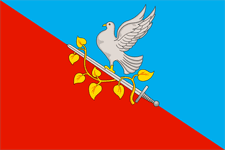
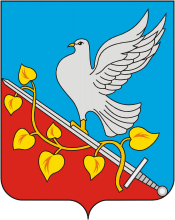
- Flag Coat of arms
- Location of Pachelmsky District in Penza Oblast
- Coordinates: 53°20′N 43°19′E
- Country: Russia
- Federal subject: Penza Oblast
- Established: 1928
- Administrative center: Pachelma

Area
  - Total: 1,300 km^{2} (500 sq mi)

Population (2010 Census)
  - Total: 16,310
  - Estimate (January 2017): 14,900
  - Density: 13/km^{2} (32/sq mi)
  - Urban: 49.4%
  - Rural: 50.6%

Administrative structure
  - Administrative divisions: 1 Work settlements, 7 Selsoviets
  - Inhabited localities: 1 urban-type settlements, 42 rural localities

Municipal structure
  - Municipally incorporated as: Pachelmsky Municipal District
  - Municipal divisions: 1 urban settlements, 7 rural settlements
- Time zone: UTC+3 (MSK)
- OKTMO ID: 56654000
- Website: http://rpach.pnzreg.ru

Population of Pachelmsky District
- 2010 Census: 16,310
- 2002 Census: 18,995
- 1989 Census: 22,263
- 1979 Census: 27,608

Pachelmsky District (Russian: Па́челмский райо́н) is an administrative and municipal district (raion), one of the twenty-seven in Penza Oblast, Russia. It is located in the west of the oblast. The area of the district is 1,300 square kilometers (500 sq mi). Its administrative center is the urban locality (a work settlement) of Pachelma. As of the 2010 Census, the total population of the district was 16,310, with the population of Pachelma accounting for 49.4% of that number.

== History ==
The district was established in 1928 within Penza Okrug of Middle Volga Oblast. It became a part of Penza Oblast in 1939.
