= Tamala, Penza Oblast =

Tamala Тамала
- Urban-type settlement
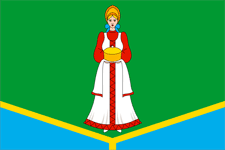
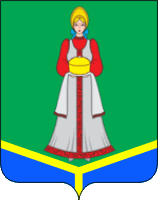
- Flag Coat of arms
- Interactive map of Tamala
- Location of Tamala Tamala (Penza Oblast)
- Coordinates: 52.5399°N 43.2553°E
- Country: Russia
- Federal subject: Penza Oblast
- Administrative district: Tamalinsky District
- Founded: 1870

Population (2010 Census)
  - Total: 7,476
  - Estimate (2021): 6,302 (−15.7%)
- Time zone: UTC+3 (MSK)
- Postal codes: 442900, 442921, 442901
- OKTMO ID: 56658151051

Tamala (Russian: Тамала) is an urban locality (an urban-type settlement) in Tamalinsky District of Penza Oblast, Russia. Population: 7,476 (2010 census); 8,062 (2002 census); 8,577 (1989 Soviet census).
