= Zemetchino, Penza Oblast =

Zemetchino Земетчино
- Urban-type settlement
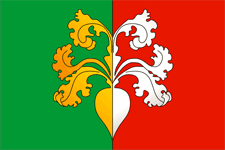
- Flag
- Interactive map of Zemetchino
- Location of Zemetchino Zemetchino (Penza Oblast)
- Coordinates: 53.4978°N 42.6202°E
- Country: Russia
- Federal subject: Penza Oblast
- Administrative district: Zemetchinsky District
- Founded: 1684

Population (2010 Census)
  - Total: 10,772
  - Estimate (2021): 9,622 (−10.7%)
- Time zone: UTC+3 (MSK)
- Postal code: 442000
- OKTMO ID: 56623151051

Zemetchino (Russian: Земетчино) is an urban locality (an urban-type settlement) in Zemetchinsky District of Penza Oblast, Russia. Population: 10,772 (2010 census); 12,088 (2002 census); 11,876 (1989 Soviet census).

== Climate ==
Climate data for Zemetchino (extremes 1880-present)
Month	Jan	Feb	Mar	Apr	May	Jun	Jul	Aug	Sep	Oct	Nov	Dec	Year
Record high °C (°F)	6.9 (44.4)	8.3 (46.9)	18.7 (65.7)	30.4 (86.7)	35.2 (95.4)	38.2 (100.8)	41.1 (106.0)	40.7 (105.3)	33.9 (93.0)	26.2 (79.2)	16.6 (61.9)	10.1 (50.2)	41.1 (106.0)
Mean daily maximum °C (°F)	−5.1 (22.8)	−4.3 (24.3)	1.4 (34.5)	12.8 (55.0)	21.5 (70.7)	24.6 (76.3)	26.8 (80.2)	25.3 (77.5)	18.6 (65.5)	10.2 (50.4)	1.5 (34.7)	−3.5 (25.7)	10.8 (51.5)
Daily mean °C (°F)	−8.2 (17.2)	−8.0 (17.6)	−2.9 (26.8)	6.9 (44.4)	14.6 (58.3)	18.3 (64.9)	20.4 (68.7)	18.5 (65.3)	12.6 (54.7)	5.9 (42.6)	−1.2 (29.8)	−6.3 (20.7)	5.9 (42.6)
Mean daily minimum °C (°F)	−11.5 (11.3)	−11.6 (11.1)	−6.8 (19.8)	1.6 (34.9)	8.1 (46.6)	12.2 (54.0)	14.2 (57.6)	12.3 (54.1)	7.5 (45.5)	2.4 (36.3)	−3.7 (25.3)	−9.1 (15.6)	1.3 (34.3)
Record low °C (°F)	−43.1 (−45.6)	−40.1 (−40.2)	−34.8 (−30.6)	−19.4 (−2.9)	−8.6 (16.5)	−1.7 (28.9)	2.5 (36.5)	0.0 (32.0)	−9.0 (15.8)	−25.4 (−13.7)	−40.1 (−40.2)	−39.4 (−38.9)	−43.1 (−45.6)
Average precipitation mm (inches)	43.3 (1.70)	34.6 (1.36)	34.3 (1.35)	29.9 (1.18)	47.9 (1.89)	62.9 (2.48)	60.1 (2.37)	46.6 (1.83)	49.3 (1.94)	48.6 (1.91)	42.1 (1.66)	43.6 (1.72)	543.2 (21.39)
Source: pogoda.ru.net

== Notable people ==
- Viktor Malyuk (1961–2004) — Russian serial killer
- Alexander Mikhailov (1905–1988) — Soviet information scientist
