= Gorodishchensky District, Penza Oblast =

Gorodishchensky District Городищенский район (Russian)
- District
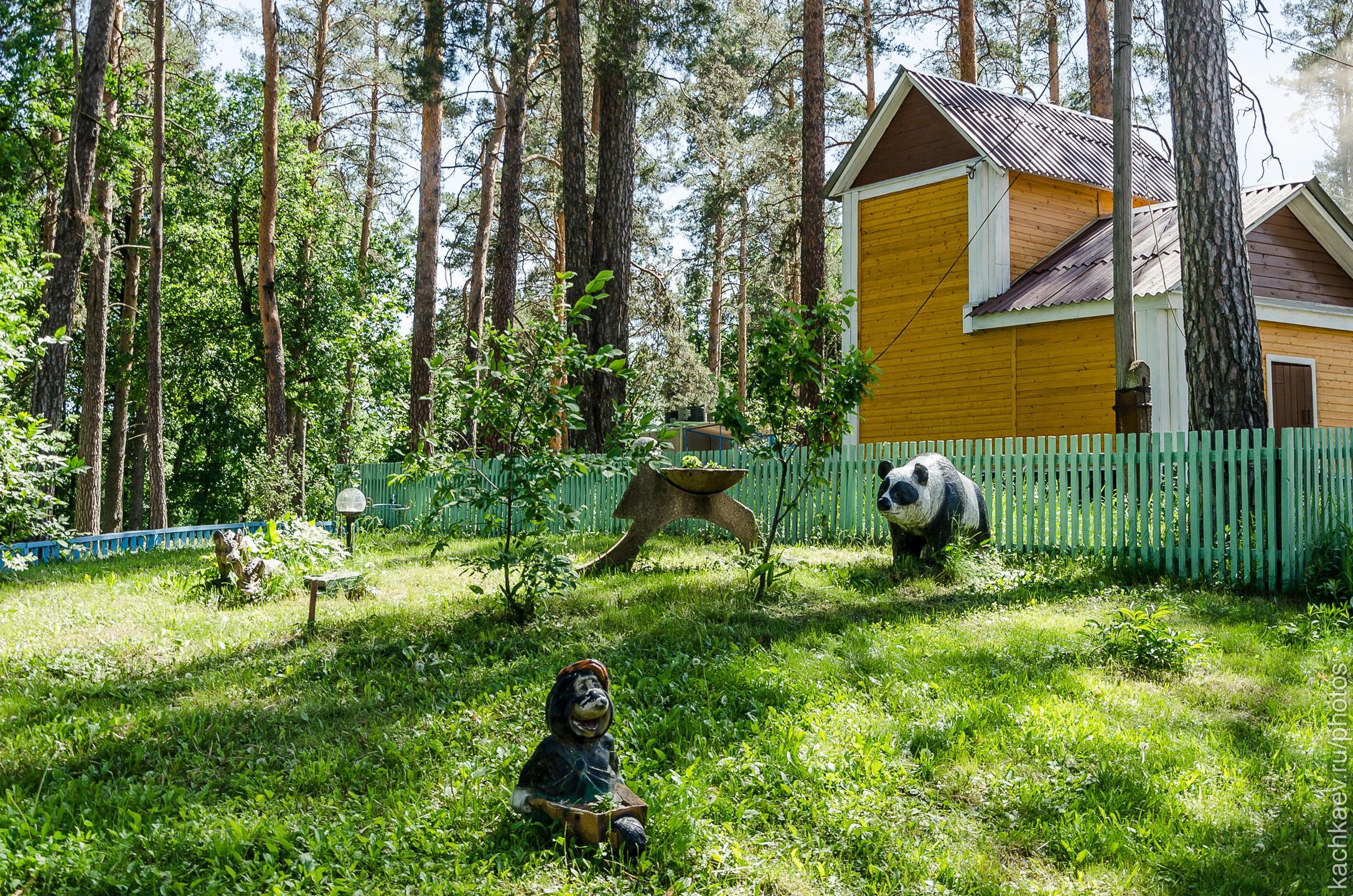
- Nikonovo, Gorodishchensky District

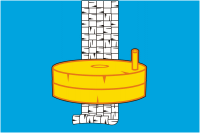
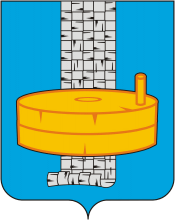
- Flag Coat of arms
- Location of Gorodishchensky District in Penza Oblast
- Coordinates: 53°16′N 45°42′E
- Country: Russia
- Federal subject: Penza Oblast
- Established: 16 July 1928
- Administrative center: Gorodishche

Area
  - Total: 2,053 km^{2} (793 sq mi)

Population (2010 Census)
  - Total: 52,480
  - Density: 25.56/km^{2} (66.21/sq mi)
  - Urban: 43.3%
  - Rural: 56.7%

Administrative structure
  - Administrative divisions: 2 Towns of district significance, 1 Work settlements, 12 Selsoviets
  - Inhabited localities: 2 cities/towns, 1 urban-type settlements, 63 rural localities

Municipal structure
  - Municipally incorporated as: Gorodishchensky Municipal District
  - Municipal divisions: 3 urban settlements, 12 rural settlements
- Time zone: UTC+3 (MSK)
- OKTMO ID: 56618000
- Website: http://rgor.pnzreg.ru/

Gorodishchensky District (Russian: Городи́щенский райо́н) is an administrative and municipal district (raion), one of the twenty-seven in Penza Oblast, Russia. It is located in the east of the oblast. The area of the district is 2,053 square kilometers (793 sq mi). Its administrative center is the town of Gorodishche. Population: 52,480 (2010 Census); 53,125 (2002 census); 58,266 (1989 Soviet census). The population of Gorodishche accounts for 15.4% of the district's total population.
