= Kolyshleysky District =

Kolyshleysky District Колышлейский район (Russian)
- District
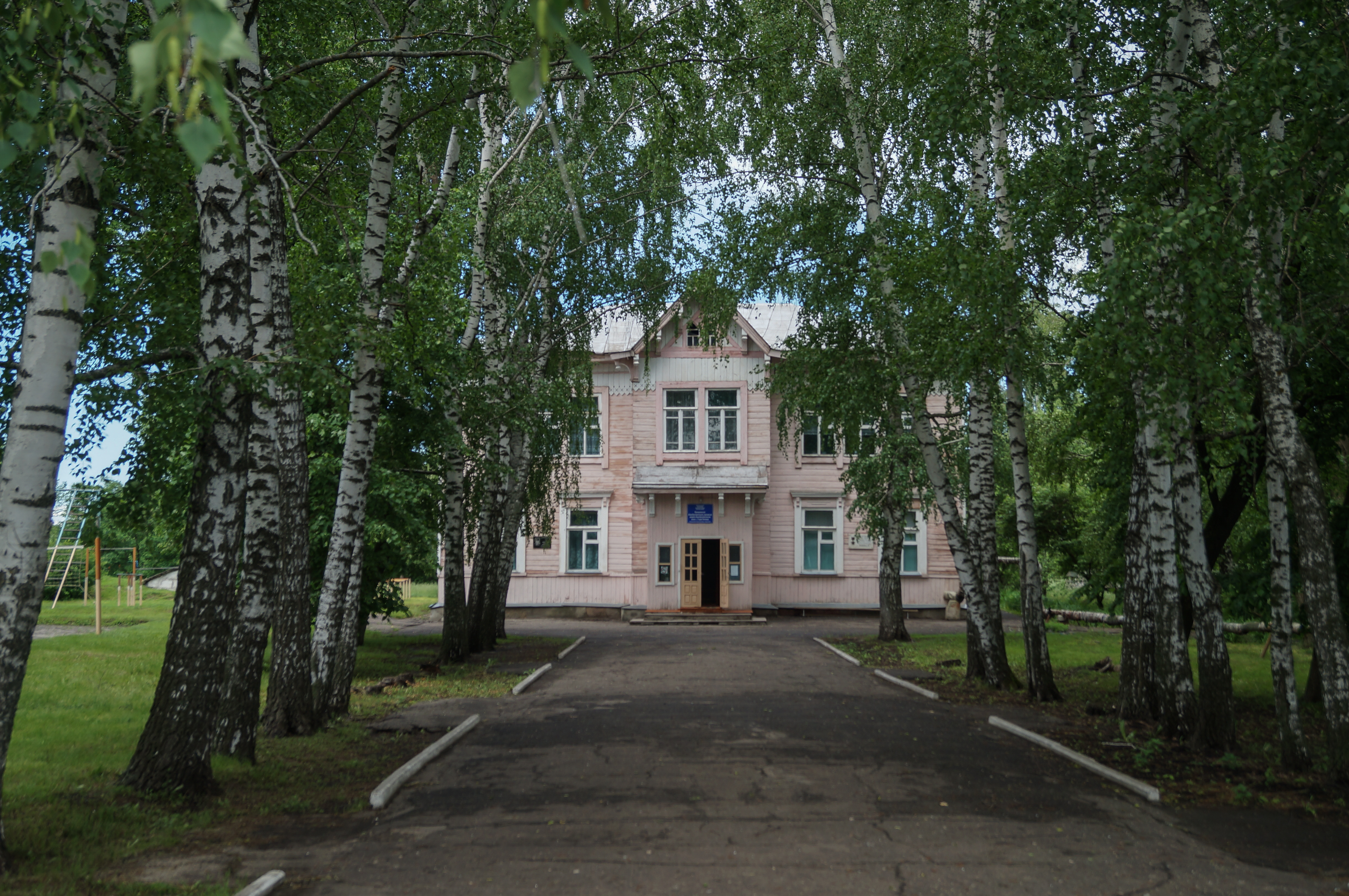
- School in Old Potlovka, Kolyshleysky District

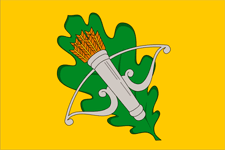
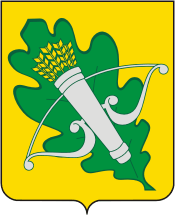
- Flag Coat of arms
- Location of Kolyshleysky District in Penza Oblast
- Coordinates: 52°42′01″N 44°32′04″E
- Country: Russia
- Federal subject: Penza Oblast
- Established: 23 July 1928
- Administrative center: Kolyshley

Area
  - Total: 1,685 km^{2} (651 sq mi)

Population (2010 Census)
  - Total: 26,187
  - Density: 15.54/km^{2} (40.25/sq mi)
  - Urban: 31.7%
  - Rural: 68.3%

Administrative structure
  - Administrative divisions: 1 Work settlements, 8 Selsoviets
  - Inhabited localities: 1 urban-type settlements, 60 rural localities

Municipal structure
  - Municipally incorporated as: Kolyshleysky Municipal District
  - Municipal divisions: 1 urban settlements, 8 rural settlements
- Time zone: UTC+3 (MSK)
- OKTMO ID: 56633000
- Website: http://rkolyshley.pnzreg.ru/

Kolyshleysky District (Russian: Колышле́йский райо́н) is an administrative and municipal district (raion), one of the twenty-seven in Penza Oblast, Russia. It is in the south of the oblast. The area of the district is 1,685 square kilometers (651 sq mi). Its administrative center is the urban locality (a work settlement) of Kolyshley. Population: 26,187 (2010 Census); 27,751 (2002 census); 29,125 (1989 Soviet census). The population of Kolyshley accounts for 31.7% of the district's total population.
