= Kolyshley =

Kolyshley Колышлей
- Urban-type settlement
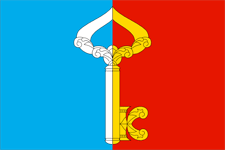
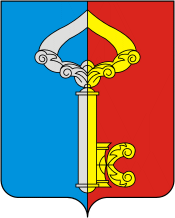
- Flag Coat of arms
- Interactive map of Kolyshley
- Location of Kolyshley Kolyshley (Penza Oblast)
- Coordinates: 52.7023°N 44.5363°E
- Country: Russia
- Federal subject: Penza Oblast
- Administrative district: Kolyshleysky District
- Founded: 1896

Population (2010 Census)
  - Total: 8,312
  - Estimate (2021): 7,978 (−4%)
- Time zone: UTC+3 (MSK)
- Postal code: 442830
- OKTMO ID: 56633151051

Kolyshley (Russian: Колышле́й) is an urban locality (an urban-type settlement) in Kolyshleysky District of Penza Oblast, Russia. Population: 8,312 (2010 census); 8,483 (2002 census); 8,995 (1989 Soviet census).
