= Voronezh Governorate =

1725–1928 unit of Russia

Coordinates: 51°40′N 39°13′E

Voronezh Governorate Воронежская губерния
- Governorate of the Russian Empire
- 1725–1928
- Coat of arms

- Location within the Russian Empire
- Capital: Voronezh
- Population
  - (1897): 2,531,253
- History
  - Established: 1725
  - Disestablished: 1928
Preceded by	Succeeded by
Azov Governorate	Central Black Earth Oblast
- Today part of: Russia; Ukraine

Voronezh Governorate (Note: Russian: Воронежская губерния, pre-1918: Воронежская губернія, romanized:Voronezhskaya guberniya; Ukrainian: Воронізька губернія) was an administrative-territorial unit (guberniya) of the Tsardom of Russia, the Russian Empire, and the Russian SFSR, which existed from 1708 (as Azov Governorate) to 1779 and again from 1796 to 1928. Its capital was located in Voronezh since 1725.

The governorate was located in the south of the European part of the Russian Empire. In 1928, the governorate was abolished, and its area was included into newly established Central Black Earth Oblast.

== First Azov Governorate ==
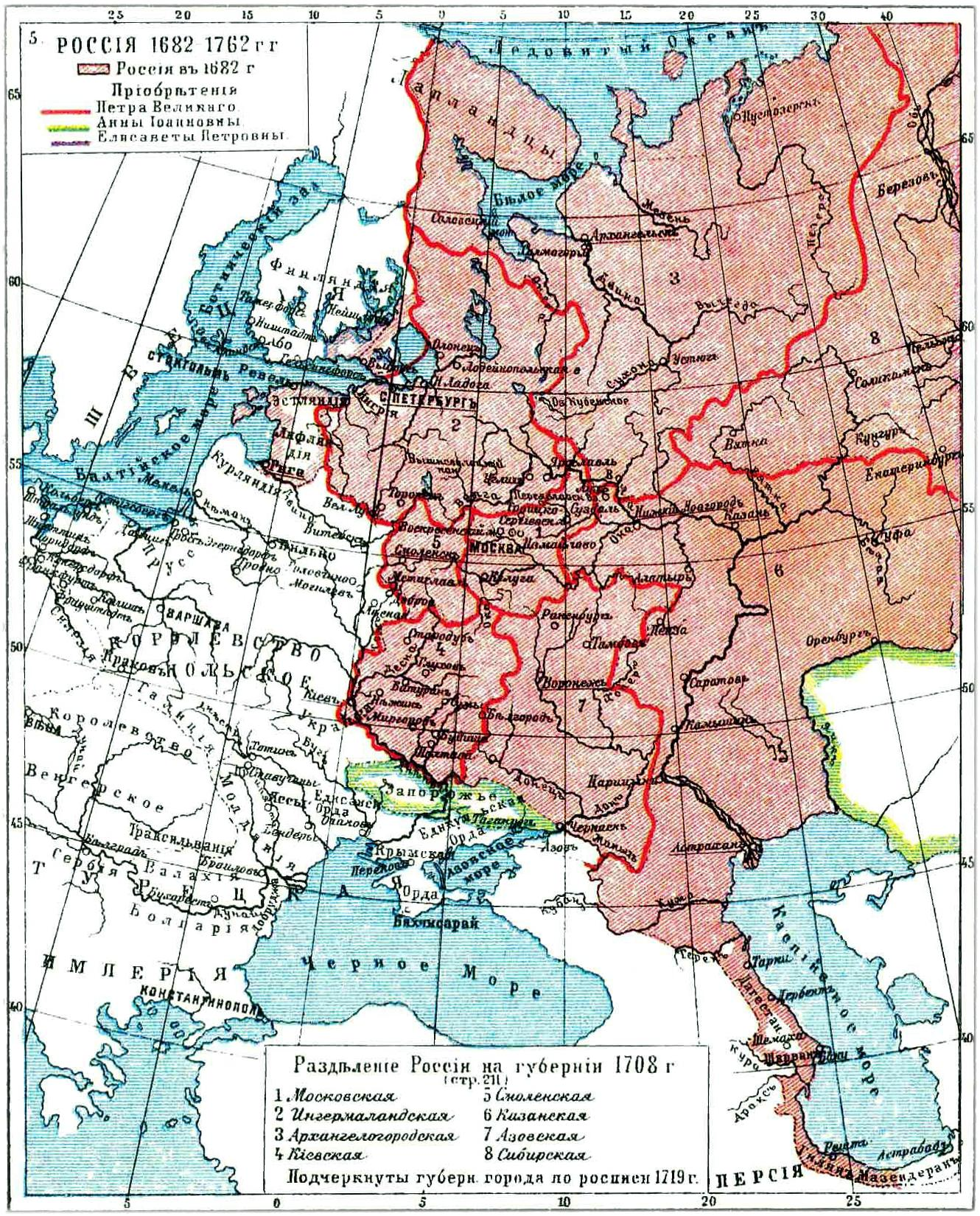
Russia in 1682–1762. Azov Governorate is shown as number 7.

Azov Governorate, together with seven other governorates, was established on December 29 [O.S. December 18], 1708, by Tsar Peter the Great's edict. As with the rest of the governorates, neither the borders nor internal subdivisions of Azov Governorate were defined; instead, the territory was defined as a set of cities and the lands adjacent to those cities. The governorate bordered Kiev Governorate in the west, Moscow Governorate in the north, and Kazan Governorate in the east. The areas south of the governorate were controlled by the Ottoman Empire, and the southern border was not defined.

Formally, Azov was the seat of the governorate, but in practice, the seat of the governor was located in Tambov until 1715 and in Voronezh after 1715. In 1725, the governorate was renamed Voronezh Governorate.

At the time of establishment, the following seventy-eight towns were included in Azov Governorate,

1. Andreyevy Lozy;
2. Atemar;
3. Azov;
4. Balykleya;
5. Belokolodskoy;
6. Belskoy;
7. Bishkin;
8. Bityug;
9. Bityutskiya syola;
10. Borisoglebskoy na Khopre;
11. Chern;
12. Chernavskoy;
13. Chernyavsk;
14. Chudnoye;
15. Chuguyev;
16. Dobroye Gorodishche;
17. Donkov;
18. Dvurechnoye;
19. Dyomshinsk;
20. Gorokhovodka;
21. Insara;
22. Inzarskoy;
23. Izyum;
24. Kamenka;
25. Kerenesk;
26. Korotoyak;
27. Kostyansk;
28. Kozlov;
29. Krasnaya Sloboda;
30. Kupchinka;
31. Liman;
32. Lebedyan;
33. Martovitsa;
34. Mayatskoy;
35. Miyus;
36. Nikonovskoy u Kalanchey;
37. Nizhny Lomov;
38. Norovchatovskoye Gorodishche;
39. Novopavlovskoy;
40. Novy Oskol;
41. Olshansk;
42. Orlov;
43. Ostrogozhskoy;
44. Ostropolye;
45. Palatov;
46. Pavlovskoy;
47. Pechenega;
48. Petrovskoy na Medveditse;
49. Potishskoy;
50. Romanov-v-Stepi;
51. Ryaskoy;
52. Sapozhok;
53. Saransk;
54. Savinskoy;
55. Senkovskoy;
56. Sergiyevskoy u Kalanchey;
57. Shatskoy;
58. Shechkeevskoy;
59. Skopin;
60. Sokolsk;
61. Tambov;
62. Tor;
63. Troitskoy on Tagan Rog;
64. Talitsa;
65. Tsaryov-Borisov;
66. Topoli;
67. Troitskoy Ostrog;
68. Uryv;
69. Userd;
70. Usman;
71. Valuyki;
72. Verkhososensk;
73. Verkhny Lomov;
74. Voronezh;
75. Yefremov;
76. Yelets;
77. Zemlyanesk;
78. Zmiyev.

In 1711, the town of Azov was ceded to Turkey, but the governorate was not renamed.

In terms of the modern political division, Azov Governorate comprised the areas of what is currently Rostov Oblast, Voronezh Oblast, Lipetsk Oblast, Tambov Oblast, and parts of Kursk Oblast, Belgorod Oblast, Tula Oblast, Oryol Oblast, Ryazan Oblast, Penza Oblast, Saratov Oblast, and the Republic of Mordovia, as well as eastern areas of Ukraine, including parts of Kharkiv, Donetsk Oblast, and Luhansk Oblast.

On June 9 [O.S. May 29], 1719, the governorate was divided into provinces: Bakhmut (with the center in Bakhmut), Shatsk, Tambov, Voronezh, and Yelets. The uyezds were transformed into districts.

In 1725, Azov Governorate was renamed into Voronezh Governorate.

=== Governors ===
The administration of the governorate was performed by a governor. The governors of First Azov Governorate were

- 1711–1719 Fyodor Matveyevich Apraksin, Governor general;
- 1717–1720 Stepan Andreyevich Kolychev, acting governor;
- 1721–1725 Pyotr Vasilyevich Izmaylov, governor;
- 1725 Grigory Petrovich Chernyshyov, governor.

=== Before 1779 ===
By that time, the governorate was divided into five provinces, defined as sets of the towns. The following towns were a part of Voronezh Governorate,

- Bakhmut Province (with the center in Bakhmut),

1. Bakhmut;
2. Borovskoy;
3. Krasnyansky;
4. Novy Aydar;
5. Raygorodok;
6. Stary Aydar;
7. Sukharev;
8. Yampol.

- Shatsk Province (Shatsk),

1. Kadom;
2. Kasimov;
3. Kerensk;
4. Krasnaya Sloboda;
5. Narovchatov;
6. Shatsk;
7. Temnikov;
8. Troitskoy Ostrog;
9. Yelatma;
10. Zalessky Stan;

- Tambov Province (Tambov),

1. Borisoglebsk;
2. Dobry;
3. Insar;
4. Verkhny Lomov;
5. Kozlov;
6. Nizhny Lomov;
7. Ryazhsk;
8. Tambov;

- Voronezh Province (Voronezh),

1. Dyomshinsk;
2. Korotoyak;
3. Kostyansk;
4. Olshansk;
5. Orlov;
6. Uryv;
7. Userd;
8. Usman;
9. Verkhososensk;
10. Voronezh;
11. Zemlyansk;
12. Bityug Volosts;
13. Ikorets Volosts;
14. Khopyor Fortress;
15. Pavlovsk;
16. Tavrov;
17. Tranzhament;

- Yelets Province (Yelets),

1. Chernavsky;
2. Dankov;
3. Lebedyan;
4. Livny;
5. Skopin;
6. Taletsky;
7. Yefremov;
8. Yelets

Three towns were subordinate to Lipetsk Iron Works, Belokolodsk, Romanov, and Sokolsk. In 1727, these towns were transferred into Bakhmut Province.

During the 18th century, some of these towns were abolished, and a number of others were mentioned as towns in later sources. In 1765, Bakhmut Province was transferred into Novorossiysk Governorate. In 1775, the provinces were abolished, and the governorate was subdivided into uyezds. At that time, the governorate consisted of Dankovsky, Demshinsky, Insarsky, Kadomsky, Kasimovsky, Kerensky, Korotoyaksky, Kozlovsky, Lebedyansky, Livensky, Narovchatsky, Nizhnelomovsky, Ryazhsky, Shatsky, Tambovsky, Temnikovsky, Userdsky, Usmansky, Verkhnelomovsky, Voronezhsky, Yefremovsky, and Yeletsky Uyezds.

In the following years, the administrative reforms continued, and governorates were gradually abolished in favor of vice-royalties. In 1778, some areas of Voronezh Governorate were transferred to Ryazan and Oryol Viceroyalties, and in 1779 Valuysky Uyezd was transferred to Voronezh Governorate. In 1779, the governorate was abolished, and Tambov and Voronezh Viceroyalty, followed in 1780 by Penza Viceroyalty, were established.

=== After 1796 ===
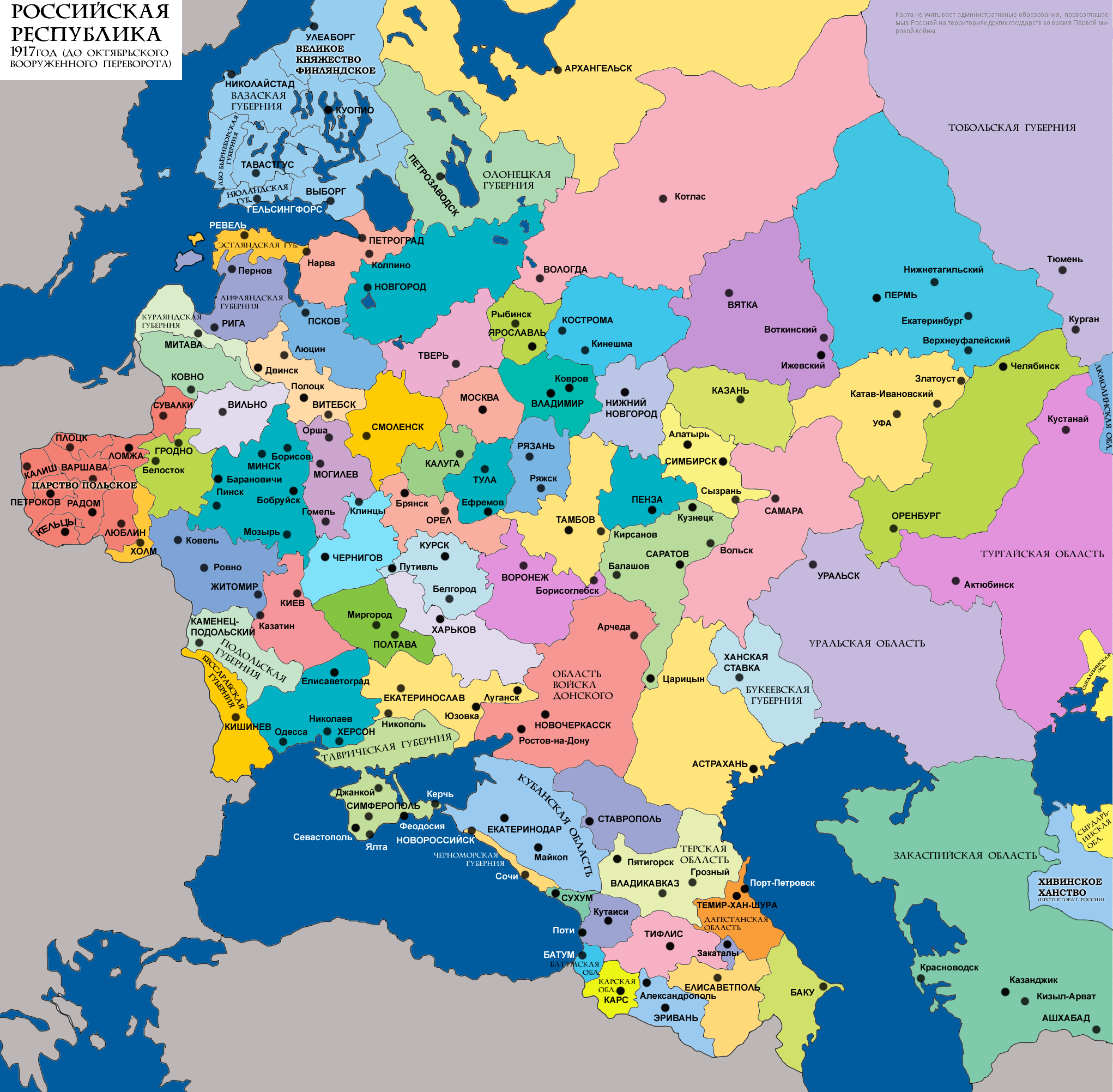
The European part of the Russian Empire in 1917. Voronezh Governorate is shown in magenta in the center of the map.

In 1796, by Decree of Tsar Pavel I, Voronezh Viceroyalty was abolished, and Voronezh Governorate was established. It consisted of nine uyezds, Biryuchensky, Bobrovsky, Korotoyaksky, Nizhnedevitsky, Pavlovsky, Valuysky, Voronezhsky, Zadonsky, and Zemlyansky.

In 1802, Bogucharsky, Ostrogozhsky, and Starobelsky Uyezds of Slobodsko-Ukrainian Governorate and Novokhopyorsky Uyezd of Saratov Governorate were transferred to Voronezh Governorate. In 1824, Starobelsky Uyezd was returned to Slobodsko-Ukrainian Governorate.

In 1923, after a series of reforms, Voronezh Governorate consisted of twelve uyezds: Bobrovsky, Bogucharsky, Kalacheyevsky, Nizhnedevitsky, Novokhopyorsky, Ostrogozhsky, Pavlovsky, Rossoshansky, Usmansky, Valuysky, Voronezhsky, and Zadonsky. In 1924, Zadonsky, Kalacheyevsky, and Pavlovsky Uyezds were abolished.

On 14 May 1928 Voronezh Governorate was abolished, and its area was included into newly established Central Black Earth Oblast.

== Governors ==
The administration of the governorate was performed by a governor. The governors of Voronezh Governorate were

- 1726 Grigory Petrovich Chernyshyov;
- 1726–1727 Ivan Mikhaylovich Likharev;
- 1728 Ivan Vasilyevich Strekalov;
- 1727–1728 Ivan Petrovich Izmaylov;
- 1728–1734 Yegor Ivanovich Pashkov;
- 1734–1735 Alexey Antonovich Myakinin;
- 1736–1740? Vasily Yakovlevich Levashov, governor general;
- 1740–1741 Grigory Alexeyevich Urusov;
- 1741–1744 Vasily Mikhaylovich Guryev;
- 1747–1760 Alexey Mikhaylovich Pushkin;
- 1760 Ivan Rodionovich Koshelev, acting governor;
- 1761–1763 Fyodor Yakovlevich Zhilin;
- 1763–1764 Grigory Prokopyevich Tolstoy;
- 1764–1766 Alexander Petrovich Lachinov;
- 1766–1773 Alexey Mikhaylovich Maslov;
- 1773–1775 Nikolay Lavrentyevich Shetnev;
- 1775–1779 Ivan Alexeyevich Potapov;
- 1797–1800 Alexander Borisovich Sontsov;
- 1800–1805 Fyodor Alexeyevich Pushkin;
- 1805–1811 Alexander Borisovich Sontsov;
- 1811–1812 Matvey Petrovich Shter;
- 1812–1817 Mikhail Ivanovich Bravin;
- 1817–1819 Nikolay Porfiryevich Dubensky;
- 1819–1820 Alexey Ivanovich Snurchevsky;
- 1820–1824 Pyotr Alexandrovich Sontsov;
- 1824–1826 Nikolay Ivanovich Krivtsov;
- 1826–1830 Boris Antonovich Aderkas;
- 1830–1836 Dmitry Nikitovich Begichev;
- 1836–1841 Nikolay Ivanovich Lodygin;
- 1841 Vladimir Porfiryevich Molostvov;
- 1841–1846 Khristophor Khristophorovich Khoven fon der Bar (Christophore Hoven von der Bar);
- 1846–1853 Nikolay Andreyevich Langel;
- 1853–1857 Yury Alexeyevich Dolgorukov;
- 1857–1859 Nikolay Petrovich Sinelnikov;
- 1859–1861 Dmitry Nikolayevich Tolstoy;
- 1861–1864 Mikhail Ivanovich Chertkov;
- 1864–1871 Vladimir Andreyevich Trubetskoy;
- 1871–1874 Dmitry Fyodorovich Kovanko;
- 1874–1878 Mikhail Alexandrovich Obolensky;
- 1878–1890 Alexey Vasilyevich Bogdanovich;
- 1890–1894 Evgeny Alexandrovich Kurovsky;
- 1894–1898 Vladimir Zakharovich Kolenko;
- 1898–1902 Pavel Alexandrovich Sleptsov;
- 1902–1906 Sergey Sergeyevich Andreyevsky;
- 1906–1909 Mikhail Mikhaylovich Bibikov;
- 1909–1914 Sergey Ivanovich Golikov;
- 1914–1915 Georgy Boleslavovich Petkevich, acting governor;
- 1915–1917 Mikhail Dmitriyevich Yershov.

== Demographics ==
=== Language ===
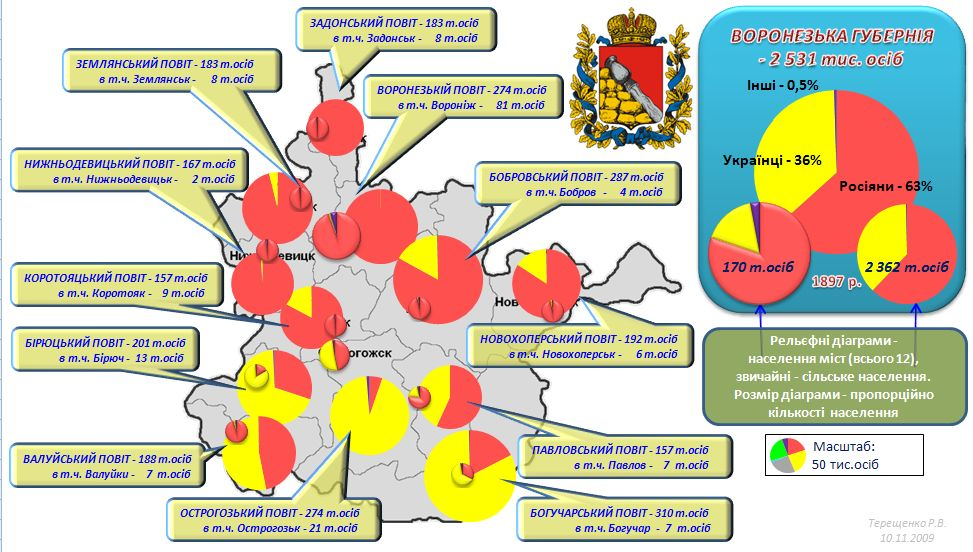
The linguistic composition of the uyezds of Voronezh in 1897. Ukrainians in yellow, Russians in red, others in purple. (in Ukrainian)

- Population by mother tongue according to the Imperial census of 1897.

Language	Number	percentage (%)	males	females
Russian	1,602,948	63.3	787,932	815,016
Ukrainian	915,883	36.1	456,389	459,494
Belarusian	3,544	0.14	1,846	1,698
Jewish	2,277	0.09	1,230	1,047
German	1,982	0.07	980	1,002
Polish	1,778	0.07	1,195	583
Gypsy	1,644	0.06	831	813
Other	1,197	0.04	942	255
Total	2,531,253	100.0	1,251,345	1,279,908
