= Nizhnedevitsk =

Nizhnedevitsk (Russian: Нижнедевицк) is the name of several rural localities in Nizhnedevitsky District of Voronezh Oblast, Russia:

- Nizhnedevitsk, Nizhnedevitskoye Rural Settlement, Nizhnedevitsky District, Voronezh Oblast, a selo in Nizhnedevitskoye Rural Settlement
- Nizhnedevitsk, Novoolshanskoye Rural Settlement, Nizhnedevitsky District, Voronezh Oblast, a settlement in Novoolshanskoye Rural Settlement
