= Ertil =

Ertil may refer to:

- Ertil Urban Settlement, an administrative division and a municipal formation which the town of Ertil and eight rural localities in Ertilsky District of Voronezh Oblast, Russia are incorporated as
- Ertil (inhabited locality), several inhabited localities in Russia
- Ertil (river), a river in Russia
- Ertil Mancaku, Albanian basketball player for PBC Tirana
