= Semidesyatnoye =

Semidesyatnoye Семидесятное
- Selo
- Location within Voronezh Oblast Location within Russia
- Coordinates: 51°20′N 38°44′E
- Country: Russia
- Region: Voronezh Oblast
- District: Khokholsky District
- Time zone: UTC+3:00

Semidesyatnoye (Russian: Семидесятное) is a rural locality (a selo) and the administrative center of Semidesyatskoye Rural Settlement, Khokholsky District, Voronezh Oblast, Russia. In the 19th century the village was the center of Semidesyatnaya volost, Nizhnedevitsky Uyezd, Voronezh Governorate. The population was 770 as of 2010. There are 17 streets.

== Geography ==
Semidesyatnoye is located 34 km south of Khokholsky (the district's administrative centre) by road. Kochetovka is the nearest rural locality.
