= Golevka, Voronezh Oblast =

Golevka Голевка
- Settlement
- Location within Voronezh Oblast Location within Russia
- Coordinates: 51°52′N 40°43′E
- Country: Russia
- Region: Voronezh Oblast
- District: Ertilsky District
- Time zone: UTC+3:00

Golevka (Russian: Голевка) is a rural locality (a settlement) in Yacheyskoye Rural Settlement, Ertilsky District, Voronezh Oblast, Russia. The population was 30 as of 2010.

== Geography ==
Golevka is located 14 km northwest of Ertil (the district's administrative centre) by road. Studyonovka is the nearest rural locality.
