= Nizhny Karabut =

Nizhny Karabut Нижний Карабут
- Selo
- Location within Voronezh Oblast Location within Russia
- Coordinates: 50°15′N 39°58′E
- Country: Russia
- Region: Voronezh Oblast
- District: Rossoshansky District
- Time zone: UTC+3:00

Nizhny Karabut (Russian: Нижний Карабут) is a rural locality (a selo) in Aleynikovskoye Rural Settlement, Rossoshansky District, Voronezh Oblast, Russia. In the 19th century the village was part of Starokalitvyanskaya volost, Ostrogozhsky Uyezd, Voronezh Governorate. The population was 409 as of 2010. There are 7 streets.

== Geography ==
Nizhny Karabut is located 34 km east of Rossosh (the district's administrative centre) by road. Nikolayevka is the nearest rural locality.
