= Gryaztsy =

Gryaztsy Грязцы
- Village
- Location within Voronezh Oblast Location within Russia
- Coordinates: 51°51′N 40°25′E
- Country: Russia
- Region: Voronezh Oblast
- District: Ertilsky District
- Time zone: UTC+3:00

Gryaztsy (Russian: Грязцы) is a rural locality (a village) in Samovetskoye Rural Settlement, Ertilsky District, Voronezh Oblast, Russia. The population was 50 in 2010. There are two streets.

== Geography ==
Gryaztsy is located 39 km west of Ertil (the district's administrative centre) by road. Kolodeyevka is the nearest rural locality.
