= Pogromets =

Pogromets Погромец
- Selo
- Location within Belgorod Oblast Location within Russia
- Coordinates: 50°20′N 37°51′E
- Country: Russia
- Region: Belgorod Oblast
- District: Volokonovsky District
- Time zone: UTC+3:00

Pogromets (Russian: Погромец) is a rural locality (a selo) and the administrative center of Pogromskoye Rural Settlement, Volokonovsky District, Belgorod Oblast, Russia. In the 19th century the village was part of Pogromskaya volost, Valuysky Uyezd, Voronezh Governorate. The population was 396 as of 2010. There are 8 streets.

== Geography ==
Pogromets is located 16 km south of Volokonovka (the district's administrative centre) by road. Verkhneyablonovo is the nearest rural locality.
