= Vyazkovka =

Vyazkovka Вязковка
- Selo
- Location within Voronezh Oblast Location within Russia
- Coordinates: 51°55′N 40°31′E
- Country: Russia
- Region: Voronezh Oblast
- District: Ertilsky District
- Time zone: UTC+3:00

Vyazkovka (Russian: Вязковка) is a rural locality (a selo) in Bityug-Matryonovskoye Rural Settlement, Ertilsky District, Voronezh Oblast, Russia. The population was 166 as of 2010. There are 3 streets.

== Geography ==
Vyazkovka is located 31 km northwest of Ertil (the district's administrative centre) by road. Gnilusha is the nearest rural locality.
