= Yacheyka =

Yacheyka Ячейка
- Selo
- Location within Voronezh Oblast Location within Russia
- Coordinates: 51°50′N 40°36′E
- Country: Russia
- Region: Voronezh Oblast
- District: Ertilsky District
- Time zone: UTC+3:00

Yacheyka (Russian: Ячейка) is a rural locality (a selo) and the administrative center of Yacheyskoye Rural Settlement, Ertilsky District, Voronezh Oblast, Russia. The population was 525 as of 2010. There are 12 streets.

== Geography ==
Yacheyka is located 15 km west of Ertil (the district's administrative centre) by road. Slastyonka is the nearest rural locality.
