= Glazovo, Nizhnedevitsky District, Voronezh Oblast =

Glazovo Глазово
- Selo
- Location within Voronezh Oblast Location within Russia
- Coordinates: 51°30′N 38°30′E
- Country: Russia
- Region: Voronezh Oblast
- District: Nizhnedevitsky District
- Time zone: UTC+3:00

Glazovo (Russian: Глазово) is a rural locality (a selo) and the administrative center of Norovo-Rotayevskoye Rural Settlement, Nizhnedevitsky District, Voronezh Oblast, Russia. The population was 782 as of 2010. There are 8 streets.

== Geography ==
Glazovo is located 12 km southeast of Nizhnedevitsk (the district's administrative centre) by road. Mikhnyovo is the nearest rural locality.
