= Mikhnyovo =

Mikhnyovo Михнёво
- Selo
- Location within Voronezh Oblast Location within Russia
- Coordinates: 51°28′N 38°32′E
- Country: Russia
- Region: Voronezh Oblast
- District: Nizhnedevitsky District
- Time zone: UTC+3:00

Mikhnyovo (Russian: Михнёво) is a rural locality (a selo) and the administrative center of Mikhnyovskoye Rural Settlement, Nizhnedevitsky District, Voronezh Oblast, Russia. The population was 470 as of 2010. There are 6 streets.

== Geography ==
Mikhnyovo is located 19 km southeast of Nizhnedevitsk (the district's administrative centre) by road. Glazovo is the nearest rural locality.
