= Slastyonka =

Slastyonka Сластёнка
- Selo
- Location within Voronezh Oblast Location within Russia
- Coordinates: 51°48′N 40°32′E
- Country: Russia
- Region: Voronezh Oblast
- District: Ertilsky District
- Time zone: UTC+3:00

Slastyonka (Russian: Сластёнка) is a rural locality (a selo) in Shchuchinsko-Peskovskoye Rural Settlement, Ertilsky District, Voronezh Oblast, Russia. The population was 82 as of 2010. There are 2 streets.

== Geography ==
Slastyonka is located on the Ertil River, 25 km west of Ertil (the district's administrative centre) by road. Stary Ertil is the nearest rural locality.
