= Novaya Olshanka =

Novaya Olshanka Новая Ольшанка
- Selo
- Location within Voronezh Oblast Location within Russia
- Coordinates: 51°39′N 38°23′E
- Country: Russia
- Region: Voronezh Oblast
- District: Nizhnedevitsky District
- Time zone: UTC+3:00

Novaya Olshanka (Russian: Новая Ольшанка) is a rural locality (a selo) and the administrative center of Novoolshanskoye Rural Settlement, Nizhnedevitsky District, Voronezh Oblast, Russia. The population was 514 as of 2010. There are 15 streets.

== Geography ==
Novaya Olshanka is located 19 km north of Nizhnedevitsk (the district's administrative centre) by road. Nizhnedevitsk is the nearest rural locality.
