= Novogeorgiyevka, Ertilsky District, Voronezh Oblast =

Novogeorgiyevka Новогеоргиевка
- Settlement
- Location within Voronezh Oblast Location within Russia
- Coordinates: 51°44′N 40°46′E
- Country: Russia
- Region: Voronezh Oblast
- District: Ertilsky District
- Time zone: UTC+3:00

Novogeorgiyevka (Russian: Новогеоргиевка) is a rural locality (a settlement) in Pervoertilskoye Rural Settlement, Ertilsky District, Voronezh Oblast, Russia. The population was 113 as of 2010. There are 2 streets.

== Geography ==
Novogeorgiyevka is located 15 km south of Ertil (the district's administrative centre) by road. Znamenka is the nearest rural locality.
