= Gorokhovka, Ertilsky District, Voronezh Oblast =

Gorokhovka Гороховка
- Selo
- Location within Voronezh Oblast Location within Russia
- Coordinates: 51°49′N 40°28′E
- Country: Russia
- Region: Voronezh Oblast
- District: Ertilsky District
- Time zone: UTC+3:00

Gorokhovka (Russian: Гороховка) is a rural locality (a selo) in Shchuchinskoye Rural Settlement, Ertilsky District, Voronezh Oblast, Russia. The population was 122 as of 2010. There are 4 streets.

== Geography ==
Gorokhovka is located on the right bank of the Bityug River, 36 km west of Ertil (the district's administrative centre) by road. Stary Ertil is the nearest rural locality.
