= Aport (apple) =

Apple cultivar group associated with Almaty, Kazakhstan

Malus domestica 'Aport'
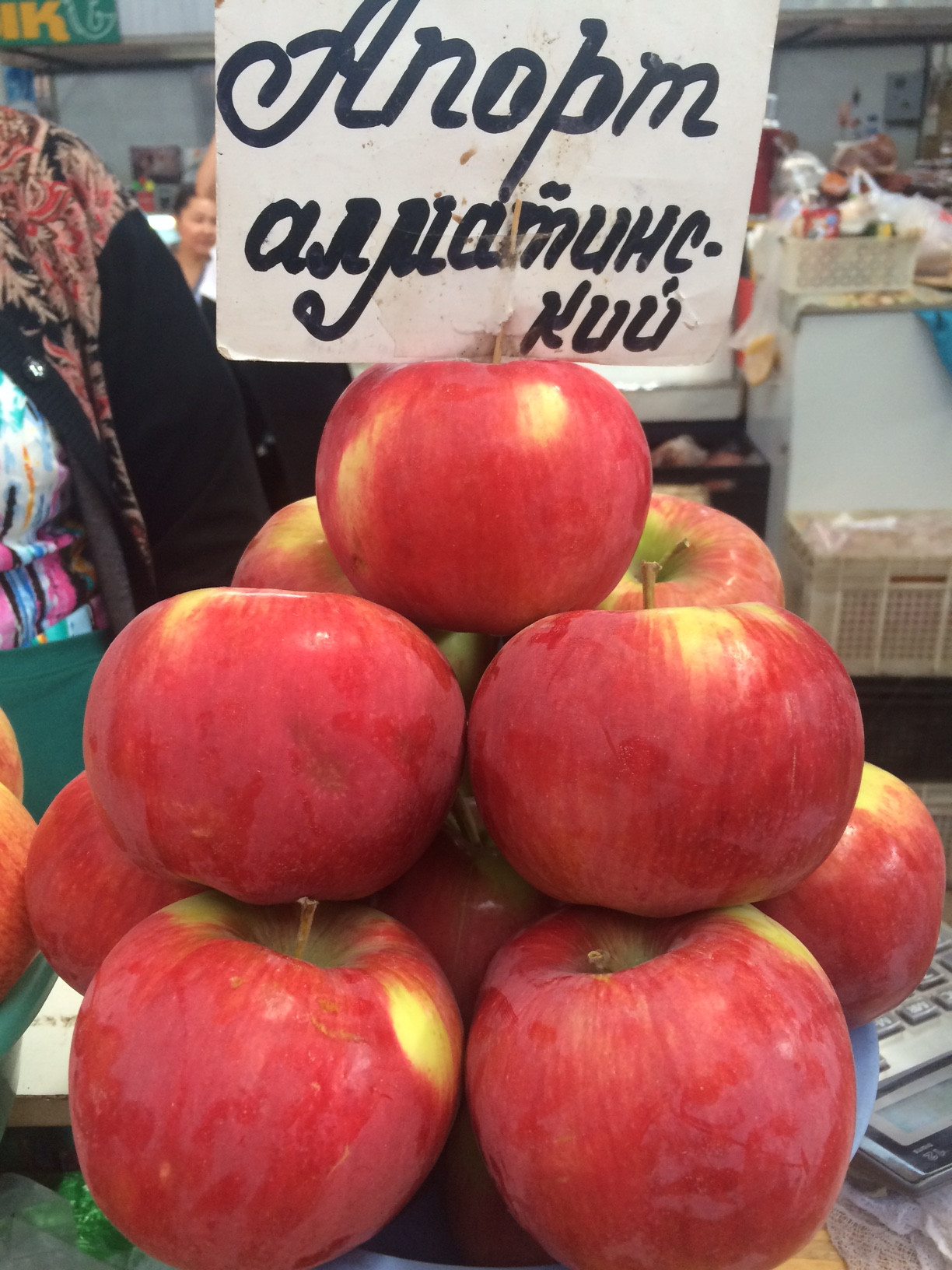
- Species: Malus domestica
- Hybrid parentage: Malus domestica × Malus sieversii (admixed hybrid)
- Cultivar group: Aport
- Origin: Possibly Central Asia; widely cultivated near Verny (modern Almaty) from the 1860s
- Cultivar group members: Aport Alexander, Ile Alatau Aport (Zailiyskiy), and c. 40 other recognised forms

The Aport (Russian: Апорт; Kazakh: Апорт алмасы) is a cultivar group of the domesticated apple (Malus domestica) most strongly associated with the foothills of the Trans-Ili Alatau around Almaty in southeastern Kazakhstan. The fruit is unusually large for a dessert apple: typical specimens weigh between 200 and 500 grams (7.1 and 17.6 oz), and exceptional ones exceed 800 grams (28 oz). Local growers credit the soil and altitude of the Almaty foothills for its strong honey-like aroma and sweet-tart flavour.

The variety's precise origin is contested. Different accounts trace it to the Balkans, to the Voronezh Governorate of the Russian Empire, or to the Almaty foothills themselves. The Aport that became famous in the late 19th and 20th centuries is generally said to have been brought to the town of Verny (modern Almaty) in 1865 and crossed in cultivation with the local wild apple Malus sieversii. It won prizes at international horticultural exhibitions in Paris in 1900 and Mannheim in 1908 and became closely identified with the city of Almaty. The area under its cultivation contracted sharply in the late 20th century; since 2012 the variety has been the subject of state and academic revival programmes in Kazakhstan. In January 2024 President of Kazakhstan Kassym-Jomart Tokayev presented the apple to the Director-General of the Food and Agriculture Organization in Rome as Kazakhstan's nominee under the FAO's "One Country One Priority Product" (OCOP) initiative.

== Name and origin ==
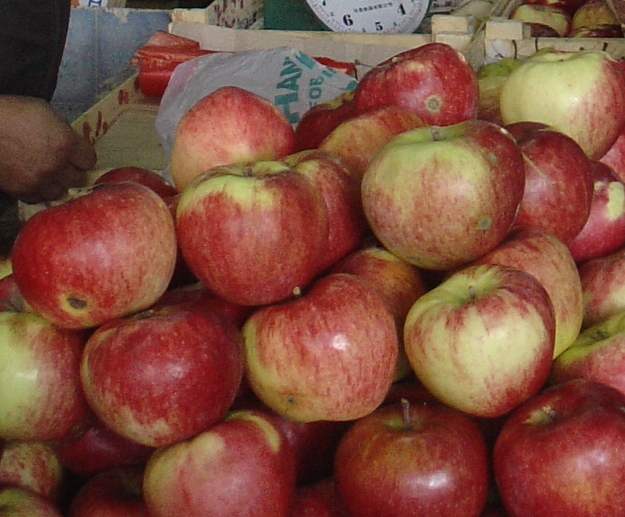
Aport apples for sale in an Almaty marketplace

The Russian word aport (Апорт) was originally a generic name for several large, late-ripening apple cultivars grown in the Russian Empire, rather than a single clonal variety. The earliest recorded use of "aport" as the name of an apple appears in monastery records dated to 1175, although it is unclear whether this refers to the cultivar group later established near Almaty. Horticultural literature has identified the variety as Ukrainian, Russian, Turkish or as a native of the Almaty mountains. Some Kazakhstani writers argue for a Balkan origin, with the variety reaching Central Asia by way of Ukraine and Russia.

By the second half of the 19th century the most influential strain was growing in the foothills of the Trans-Ili Alatau, in what was then Semirechye Oblast of the Russian Empire. According to an account by the local historian Magzhan Issin, widely repeated in the Kazakhstani press, a peasant from Ostrogozhsk in Voronezh Governorate named Yegor Redko brought Aport seedlings to Verny in 1865 and planted them on the bank of the Malaya Almatinka River, grafting some onto local wild apple stock. The seedlings were considered unremarkable in their place of origin, but produced unusually large and aromatic fruit in the new environment, and the resulting cultivar was named after the village. In 1914 the senior horticultural inspector S. Perkovsky reported to the Russian imperial authorities that the Aport apple and the Forest Beauty pear were the two varieties for which "nature has provided suitable conditions" specifically in the surroundings of Verny.

The hybridisation with Malus sieversii, the wild Central Asian apple now recognised as the principal ancestor of the domesticated apple, is generally credited with producing the variety's characteristic size and flavour. The Slow Food Foundation's Ark of Taste catalogue states that the Aport "developed into the high quality fruit that it is today" only after orchards were established in the Alatau mountains.

== Description ==
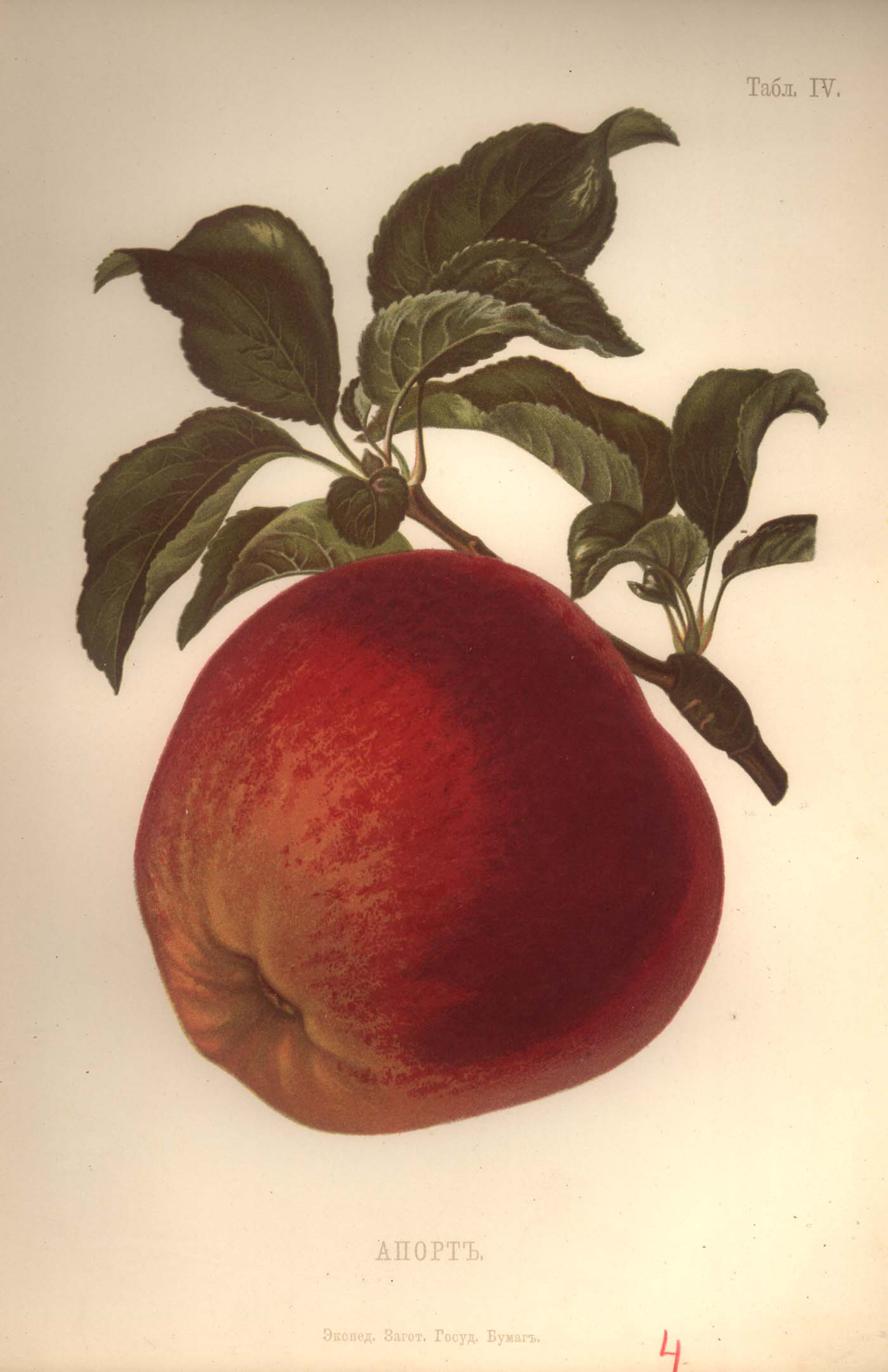
1906 sketch of the Aport by botanist Adam Hrebnicki-Doktorowicz

Aport apples are large to very large by European dessert-apple standards. The Slow Food Foundation gives an average fruit weight of 220–250 grams (7.8–8.8 oz), with single fruits reaching 800 grams (28 oz) or more under favourable conditions. Other sources report typical weights of 200–300 grams (7.1–10.6 oz), occasional fruits approaching 1 kilogram (2.2 lb), and the related Aport Alexander reaching about 900 grams (32 oz). The fruit is broadly round to slightly heart-shaped and tapers towards the base. The skin is thick, smooth and waxy, with a yellow to greenish-yellow ground colour overlaid by bright red striping and blush, sometimes with a brownish-red russet near the stem. The flesh is pale yellow-green, fine-grained and crisp at harvest, becoming softer and crumblier as the fruit matures in storage. Tasters describe the aroma as honey-like, with secondary notes of hazelnut and anise.

The Aport ripens late. In its main area of cultivation harvest takes place in the second half of September, and the fruit keeps under traditional cool storage until mid-January or early February; modern controlled-atmosphere storage extends this until June. Local growers have traditionally stored the apples under straw to ripen and dried them for winter use; the variety is also processed into juice, compote, jam and baked goods.

A number of forms are recognised within the Aport group. The Kazakh Research Institute of Fruit Growing and Viticulture has reported the existence of more than 40 such forms internationally, including Aport Alexander (sometimes treated as the original Russian form) and the Ile Alatau Aport, also called Zailiyskiy, developed at the institute from a cross between the Reinette-type Burchardt and Aport Alexander.

== Cultivation ==
Within Kazakhstan, Aport apples are grown principally in the foothills of the Trans-Ili Alatau and the Dzungarian Alatau, at altitudes between roughly 850 and 1,250 metres (2,790 and 4,100 ft). The Kazakh Research Institute of Fruit Growing and Viticulture has identified the irrigated lower- and middle-mountain zones of the Trans-Ili Alatau, between about 950 and 1,200 metres (3,120 and 3,940 ft), as optimal, with the foothill belt of the Sarkand and Eskeldi districts in the Dzungarian Alatau also suitable. The southern districts of Zhambyl Region and Turkistan Region, as well as lower elevations of the Almaty Region, are not recommended; quality fruit reportedly cannot be produced reliably below about 850 metres (2,790 ft).

The cultivar is considered demanding to grow. It is slow to come into bearing, with first crops appearing seven to ten years after planting, compared with three to five years for varieties such as Golden Delicious or Starkrimson. It also tends towards strong biennial fruiting, with abundant crops in one year often followed by a much reduced harvest the next. Specialists at the Kazakh Research Institute of Fruit Growing and Viticulture have developed drip irrigation systems specifically for Aport orchards, intended to maintain the soil-moisture conditions in which the variety is most productive.

== Cultural significance ==
The Aport is widely described in the Kazakhstani and international press as the "calling card" of Almaty, whose Kazakh name is most often translated as "Father of Apples" or "place of abundance of apples"; the city's earlier Russian name Alma-Ata carries the same meaning. The fruit appears widely in the city's visual culture, including murals, public sculptures, the apple-shaped "Alma" Wishing Fountain in Kok-Tobe Park, and the name of one of the country's largest shopping centres, the Aport Mall on the western edge of the city.

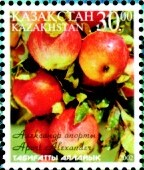
Kazakh stamp featuring the Aport

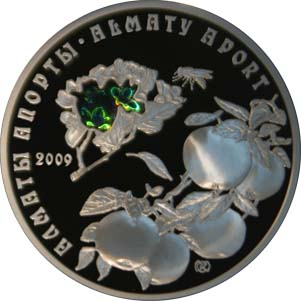
2009 Kazakh 500-tenge coin featuring the Aport

In 2002 Kazpost issued an "Ile-Alatau National Park" postal block featuring an image of an Aport Alexander apple. On 18 February 2009 the National Bank of Kazakhstan released a 500-tenge commemorative coin dedicated to the Almaty Aport. The annual AlmaFest festival, held in Almaty in September, is centred on the city's apple heritage and on the Aport in particular, with masterclasses, an open-air contemporary art exhibition and a market of regional varieties. The variety has also entered Kazakh proverb and song; horticulturalists Awais Khan and Valpuri Sovero of Cornell University have written that, for many Kazakhs, "these large fruits are more than just a delicious snack; they are a symbol of abundance and prosperity."

In international media the Aport is often treated as the cultivated counterpart to the wild Malus sieversii from which the modern apple descends. Smithsonian magazine in 2023 described the campaign to obtain a geographical indication for the Aport, comparable to the protected status of Parmesan cheese or Champagne wine, as part of a wider effort to draw attention to the apple forests of southern Kazakhstan.

== Decline and revival ==
According to the Kazakhstani Ministry of Agriculture, the country had about 3.85 million Aport trees in 1970, of which roughly 79 per cent (about 3.04 million) were concentrated in the Almaty Region. By 1984 the total had fallen to about 1.4 million. The decline accelerated in the 1990s, when the privatisation of orchard land in the Almaty foothills was followed by widespread clearance of older Aport plantations and the construction of suburban housing in their place. Saule Kazybayeva, deputy chair of the board of the Kazakh Research Institute of Fruit Growing and Viticulture, has attributed the contraction of the variety to a combination of urbanisation, the Aport's slow entry into bearing, and competition from earlier-bearing varieties such as Golden Delicious. She also points to the loss of the traditional practice of grafting Aport scions onto wild M. sieversii rootstock, which she argues is necessary to maintain the cultivar's flavour.

International attention to the variety dates from the early 2000s. In 2005 the International Labour Organization launched a project in Kazakhstan to introduce modern cooperative principles among apple farmers in the Taldykorgan region, aiming to help small producers compete with imports through collective action and vocational training. Around the same time, efforts to revive the Almaty aport variety specifically were reported by BBC News, which highlighted government and local initiatives to restore orchards in the city's foothills. In 2007 the International Science and Technology Center approved a multi-year project K-483 at the Kazakh State Agricultural University on the "Revival of the Unique Variety of the Aport Apple Tree" through grafting and micro-cloning of selected wild stocks, though the project was approved without ISTC funding.

A more sustained scientific revival began in 2012, when the biotechnology laboratory of the KazNII, then under the late professor Magzhan Issin, started selecting individual Aport types and freeing them from accumulated viral infections. In 2024 the Ministry of Agriculture and the National Agrarian Scientific and Educational Centre announced a state Aport revival programme running from 2024 to 2028. Under the programme, seedlings of Malus sieversii were to be collected and used to establish a 10-hectare (25-acre) mother garden at the Talgar regional branch of KazNII in 2025, with about 25,000 saplings of selected Aport types planted on around 110 hectares (270 acres) in the Almaty Region by 2028 and offered to commercial growers thereafter; the first significant harvest is expected eight years after planting, with mature yields projected at up to 100 kilograms (220 lb) per tree.

In January 2024 President Tokayev presented Aport apples to FAO Director-General Qu Dongyu in Rome and announced the variety's inclusion in the FAO's "One Country One Priority Product" initiative, launched in 2021 to promote agricultural products of distinctive geographical and cultural character. In late 2023 the Kazakhstani Ministry of Justice confirmed that the Almaty Aport had been formally recognised as a Kazakhstani brand, and Kazakhstani officials indicated that an international geographical indication would require further molecular-genetic analysis of the preserved Aport forms held by the Kazakh Research Institute of Fruit Growing and Viticulture. As of 2024 total Aport plantings in the Almaty and Zhetysu regions were reported to cover about 2,500 hectares (6,200 acres), comprising roughly 416,000 trees.

== See also ==
- List of apple cultivars
- Malus sieversii
- Almaty
- Geographical indication
- Plant breeding
- Ark of Taste
- Slow Food
