= Veselovka, Voronezh Oblast =

Veselovka Веселовка
- Settlement
- Location within Voronezh Oblast Location within Russia
- Coordinates: 51°51′N 40°45′E
- Country: Russia
- Region: Voronezh Oblast
- District: Ertilsky District
- Time zone: UTC+3:00

Veselovka (Russian: Веселовка) is a rural locality (a settlement) in Ertil, Ertilsky District, Voronezh Oblast, Russia. The population was 135 as of 2010. There are 2 streets.

== Geography ==
Veselovka is located 5 km northwest of Ertil (the district's administrative centre) by road. Ertil is the nearest rural locality.
