= Stary Ertil =

Stary Ertil Старый Эртиль
- Selo
- Location within Voronezh Oblast Location within Russia
- Coordinates: 51°48′N 40°29′E
- Country: Russia
- Region: Voronezh Oblast
- District: Ertilsky District
- Time zone: UTC+3:00

Stary Ertil (Russian: Старый Эртиль) is a rural locality (a selo) in Shchuchinskoye Rural Settlement, Ertilsky District, Voronezh Oblast, Russia. The population was 376 as of 2010. There are 7 streets.

== Geography ==
Stary Ertil is located 32 km west of Ertil (the district's administrative centre) by road. Slastyonka is the nearest rural locality.
