= Gnilusha, Ertilsky District, Voronezh Oblast =

Gnilusha Гнилуша
- Selo
- Location within Voronezh Oblast Location within Russia
- Coordinates: 51°53′N 40°30′E
- Country: Russia
- Region: Voronezh Oblast
- District: Ertilsky District
- Time zone: UTC+3:00

Gnilusha (Russian: Гнилуша) is a rural locality (a selo) in Bityug-Matryonovskoye Rural Settlement, Ertilsky District, Voronezh Oblast, Russia. The population was 236 as of 2010. There are 6 streets.

== Geography ==
Gnilusha is located on the left bank of the Bityug River, 26 km northwest of Ertil (the district's administrative centre) by road. Bolshoy Samovets is the nearest rural locality.
