= Bolshaya Dobrinka =

Bolshaya Dobrinka Большая Добринка
- Selo
- Location within Voronezh Oblast Location within Russia
- Coordinates: 51°53′N 40°51′E
- Country: Russia
- Region: Voronezh Oblast
- District: Ertilsky District
- Time zone: UTC+3:00

Bolshaya Dobrinka (Russian: Большая Добринка) is a rural locality (a selo) and the administrative center of Bolshedobrinskoye Rural Settlement, Ertilsky District, Voronezh Oblast, Russia. The population was 495 as of 2010. There are 11 streets.

== Geography ==
Bolshaya Dobrinka is located 6 km northeast of Ertil (the district's administrative centre) by road. Ertil is the nearest rural locality.
