= Kostomarovo =

Village in Voronezh Oblast, Russia

Kostomarovo Костомарово
- Selo
- Location within Voronezh Oblast Location within Russia
- Coordinates: 50°41′N 39°46′E
- Country: Russia
- Region: Voronezh Oblast
- District: Podgorensky District
- Time zone: UTC+3:00

Kostomarovo (Russian: Костома́рово) is a rural locality (a selo) in Yudinskoye Rural Settlement, Podgorensky District, Voronezh Oblast, Russia. In the 19th century the village was part of Sagunovskaya volost, Ostrogozhsky Uyezd, Voronezh Governorate. The population was 263 as of 2010. There are 4 streets.

== Geography ==
Kostomarovo is located on the Central Russian Upland, 40 km north of Podgorensky (the district's administrative centre) by road. Pokrovka is the nearest rural locality.
