= Voznesenovka, Ertilsky District, Voronezh Oblast =

Voznesenovka Вознесеновка
- Settlement
- Location within Voronezh Oblast Location within Russia
- Coordinates: 51°47′N 40°48′E
- Country: Russia
- Region: Voronezh Oblast
- District: Ertilsky District
- Time zone: UTC+3:00

Voznesenovka (Russian: Вознесеновка) is a rural locality (a settlement) in Pervoertilskoye Rural Settlement, Ertilsky District, Voronezh Oblast, Russia. The population was 24 as of 2010.

== Geography ==
Voznesenovka is located 6 km south of Ertil (the district's administrative centre) by road. Vasilyevka is the nearest rural locality.
