= Bolshoy Samovets =

Bolshoy Samovets Большой Самовец
- Selo
- Location within Voronezh Oblast Location within Russia
- Coordinates: 51°54′N 40°28′E
- Country: Russia
- Region: Voronezh Oblast
- District: Ertilsky District
- Time zone: UTC+3:00

Bolshoy Samovets (Russian: Большой Самовец) is a rural locality (a selo) and the administrative center of Samovetskoye Rural Settlement, Ertilsky District, Voronezh Oblast, Russia. The population was 719 as of 2010. There are 9 streets.

== Geography ==
Bolshoy Samovets is located 29 km northwest of Ertil (the district's administrative centre) by road. Gnilusha is the nearest rural locality.
