= Bityug-Matryonovka =

Bityug-Matryonovka Битюг-Матрёновка
- Selo
- Location within Voronezh Oblast Location within Russia
- Coordinates: 51°52′N 40°29′E
- Country: Russia
- Region: Voronezh Oblast
- District: Ertilsky District
- Time zone: UTC+3:00

Bityug-Matryonovka (Russian: Битюг-Матрёновка) is a rural locality (a selo) and the administrative center of Bityug-Matryonovskoye Rural Settlement, Ertilsky District, Voronezh Oblast, Russia. The population was 533 as of 2010. There are 6 streets.

== Geography ==
Bityug-Matryonovka is located 25 km northwest of Ertil (the district's administrative centre) by road. Kolodeyevka is the nearest rural locality.
