= Pervo-Ertil =

Pervo-Ertil Перво-Эртиль
- Settlement
- Location within Voronezh Oblast Location within Russia
- Coordinates: 51°43′N 40°48′E
- Country: Russia
- Region: Voronezh Oblast
- District: Ertilsky District
- Time zone: UTC+3:00

Pervo-Ertil (Russian: Перво-Эртиль) is a rural locality (a settlement) and the administrative center of Pervoertilskoye Rural Settlement, Ertilsky District, Voronezh Oblast, Russia. The population was 356 as of 2010. There are 3 streets.

== Geography ==
Pervo-Ertil is located 11 km south of Ertil (the district's administrative centre) by road. Dmitriyevka is the nearest rural locality.
