= Borshchyovskiye Peski =

Borshchyovskiye Peski Борщёвские Пески
- Selo
- Location within Voronezh Oblast Location within Russia
- Coordinates: 51°42′N 40°33′E
- Country: Russia
- Region: Voronezh Oblast
- District: Ertilsky District
- Time zone: UTC+3:00

Borshchyovskiye Peski (Russian: Борщёвские Пески) is a rural locality (a selo) and the administrative center of Borshchyovo-Peskovskoye Rural Settlement, Ertilsky District, Voronezh Oblast, Russia. The population was 605 as of 2010. There are 8 streets.

== Geography ==
Borshchyovskiye Peski is located 31 km southwest of Ertil (the district's administrative centre) by road. Borshyovo is the nearest rural locality.
