= Shukavka =

Shukavka Шукавка
- Selo
- Location within Voronezh Oblast Location within Russia
- Coordinates: 51°55′N 40°37′E
- Country: Russia
- Region: Voronezh Oblast
- District: Ertilsky District
- Time zone: UTC+3:00

Shukavka (Russian: Шукавка) is a rural locality (a selo) in Morozovskoye Rural Settlement, Ertilsky District, Voronezh Oblast, Russia. The population was 52 as of 2010. There are 3 streets.

== Geography ==
Shukavka is located 18 km northwest of Ertil (the district's administrative centre) by road. Yacheyka is the nearest rural locality.
