= Malye Yasyrki =

Malye Yasyrki Малые Ясырки
- Selo
- Location within Voronezh Oblast Location within Russia
- Coordinates: 51°39′N 40°31′E
- Country: Russia
- Region: Voronezh Oblast
- District: Ertilsky District
- Time zone: UTC+3:00

Malye Yasyrki (Russian: Малые Ясырки) is a rural locality (a selo) in Borshchyovo-Peskovskoye Rural Settlement, Ertilsky District, Voronezh Oblast, Russia. The population was 42 as of 2010. There are two streets.

== Geography ==
Malye Yasyrki is located 69 km southwest of Ertil (the district's administrative centre) by road. Aloye Pole is the nearest rural locality.
