= Kolodeyevka, Ertilsky District, Voronezh Oblast =

Kolodeyevka Колодеевка
- Village
- Location within Voronezh Oblast Location within Russia
- Coordinates: 51°52′N 40°26′E
- Country: Russia
- Region: Voronezh Oblast
- District: Ertilsky District
- Time zone: UTC+3:00

Kolodeyevka (Russian: Колодеевка) is a rural locality (a village) in Samovetskoye Rural Settlement, Ertilsky District, Voronezh Oblast, Russia. The population was 101 as of 2010. There are two streets: Lugovaya (Луговая) and Tsentralnaya (Центральная).

== Geography ==
Kolodeyevka is located 35 km northwest of Ertil (the district's administrative centre) by road. Gryaztsy is the nearest rural locality.
