= Morozovka, Ertilsky District, Voronezh Oblast =

Morozovka Морозовка
- Settlement
- Location within Voronezh Oblast Location within Russia
- Coordinates: 51°55′N 40°43′E
- Country: Russia
- Region: Voronezh Oblast
- District: Ertilsky District
- Time zone: UTC+3:00

Morozovka (Russian: Морозовка) is a rural locality (a settlement) in Morozovskoye Rural Settlement, Ertilsky District, Voronezh Oblast, Russia. The population was 52 as of 2010.

== Geography ==
Morozovka is located 15 km northwest of Ertil (the district's administrative centre) by road. Maryevka is the nearest rural locality.
