= Maryevka, Ertilsky District, Voronezh Oblast =

Maryevka Марьевка
- Settlement
- Location within Voronezh Oblast Location within Russia
- Coordinates: 51°54′N 40°43′E
- Country: Russia
- Region: Voronezh Oblast
- District: Ertilsky District
- Time zone: UTC+3:00

Maryevka (Russian: Марьевка) is a rural locality (a settlement) and the administrative center of Morozovskoye Rural Settlement, Ertilsky District, Voronezh Oblast, Russia. The population was 215 as of 2010. There are 3 streets.

== Geography ==
Maryevka is located 14 km northwest of Ertil (the district's administrative centre) by road. Morozovka is the nearest rural locality.
