= Shchuchinskiye Peski =

Shchuchinskiye Peski Щучинские Пески
- Selo
- Location within Voronezh Oblast Location within Russia
- Coordinates: 51°45′N 40°32′E
- Country: Russia
- Region: Voronezh Oblast
- District: Ertilsky District
- Time zone: UTC+3:00

Shchuchin Peski village, Ertilsky district. Church of St. Demetrius of Thessaloniki.

Shchuchinskiye Peski (Russian: Щучинские Пески) is a rural locality (a selo) and the administrative center of Shchuchinsko-Peskovskoye Rural Settlement, Ertilsky District, Voronezh Oblast, Russia. The population was 672 as of 2010. There are 10 streets.

== Geography ==
Shchuchinskiye Peski is located 24 km southwest of Ertil (the district's administrative centre) by road. Shchuchye is the nearest rural locality.
