= Nikolay Borodin =

Red Army sergeant

Nikolay Ivanovich Borodin
- Born: 25 September 1923; Koshelevka, Penza Governorate, Russian SFSR
- Died: 24 October 1975 (aged 52); Gorky, Soviet Union
- Military career
- Allegiance: Soviet Union
- Branch: Red Army
- Service years: 1942–1945
- Rank: Senior Sergeant
- Unit: 1st Guards Motor Rifle Division
- Awards: Order of Lenin; Order of the Patriotic War (2nd class); Order of the Red Star; Medal "For Courage"; Medal "For the Defence of Stalingrad"; Medal "For the Victory over Germany in the Great Patriotic War 1941–1945"; Jubilee Medal "Twenty Years of Victory in the Great Patriotic War 1941–1945"; Jubilee Medal "Thirty Years of Victory in the Great Patriotic War 1941–1945"; Medal "50 Years of the Armed Forces of the USSR"; Medal "In Commemoration of the 100th Anniversary of the Birth of Vladimir Ilyich Lenin"

Nikolay Ivanovich Borodin (Николай Иванович Бородин; 25 September 1923 – 24 October 1975) was a senior sergeant of the Red Army and a participant in the Great Patriotic War. He was awarded the title Hero of the Soviet Union in 1945 for bravery during the crossing of the Neman River.

== Biography ==
Borodin was born on 25 September 1923 in the village of Koshelevka, Penza Governorate (now Spassky District, Penza Oblast), into a peasant family. In 1935, his family moved to the city of Gorky (now Nizhny Novgorod), where he completed seven years of school and attended a factory apprenticeship school at a machine tool plant. He worked as a turner at the Vorobyov Factory.

In 1942, Borodin was drafted into the Red Army and sent to the front. He served from an anti-tank gunner to an assistant platoon commander, taking part in the battles on the Kalinin Front, Don Front, Voronezh Front, 1st Baltic Front, and 3rd Belorussian Front. In 1944, he joined the VKP(b). He was wounded four times during combat. Borodin fought in the Rzhev–Vyazma offensive (1942), the Battle of Stalingrad, the Battle of Kursk, the liberation of Belarus and the Baltic States, the crossing of the Neman River, and the East Prussian offensive.

By July 1944, Guards Senior Sergeant Borodin served as assistant platoon commander of the 171st Guards Rifle Regiment, 1st Guards Motor Rifle Division, 11th Guards Army, 3rd Belorussian Front.

On 14 July 1944, despite enemy fire, Borodin was the first in his regiment to cross the Neman near Alytus. Though wounded, he remained on the battlefield and helped secure the bridgehead on the western bank. With his group, he destroyed about a company of enemy soldiers.

By decree of the Presidium of the Supreme Soviet of the USSR on 24 March 1945, for "exemplary performance of combat missions of the command at the front against the German invaders and for the courage and heroism displayed," Guards Senior Sergeant Nikolai Borodin was awarded the title of Hero of the Soviet Union with the Order of Lenin and the Gold Star Medal (No. 7337).

In March 1945, Borodin was demobilized due to disability. He worked for three years as chairman of a kolkhoz in the Narovchatsky District of Penza Oblast, and later returned to Gorky, where he worked at the Gorky Automobile Plant. He died on 24 October 1975 and was buried in the Old Avtozavodskoye Cemetery.

Borodin also received the Order of the Patriotic War (2nd class), the Order of the Red Star, the Medal "For Courage", and several other medals.

== Commemoration ==
- A bust of Nikolay Borodin stands in the village of Narovchat on the Alley of Heroes, dedicated to natives and residents of the Narovchatsky District of Penza Oblast.
- A memorial plaque in honor of Nikolay Borodin is installed on the house where he lived in Nizhny Novgorod.
