= Peter of Krutitsy =

Russian Eastern Orthodox bishop

Metropolitan Peter of Krutitsy
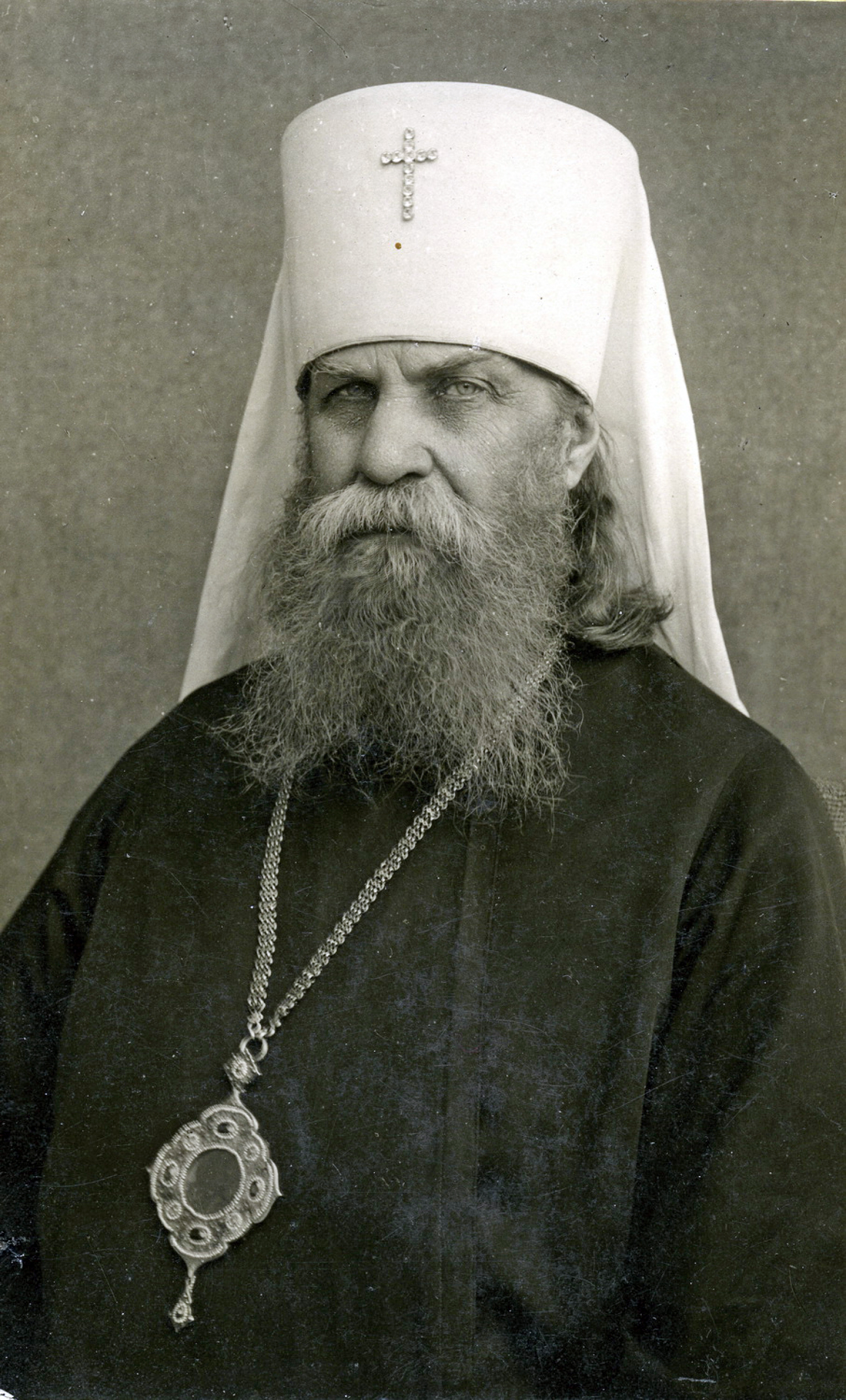
- Peter in 1925

Hieromartyr
- Born: July 10, 1862 (N.S./June 28, 1862 (O.S.); Storozhevoye, Voronezh Governorate, Russian Empire
- Died: October 10, 1937/September 27 (O.S.); Magnitogorsk, Chelyabinsk
- Venerated in: Eastern Orthodox Church
- Canonized: February 23, 1997 by Russian Orthodox Church
- Feast: September 27/October 10
- Attributes: Vested as a bishop, right hand raised in blessing

Peter of Krutitsy (Священному́ченик Пётр Крути́цкий, born Pyotr Fyodorovich Polyansky, Пётр Фёдорович Поля́нский; July 10, 1862 (June 28 O.S.) – October 10, 1937 (September 27 O. S.), was a Russian Orthodox bishop and martyr. From April 12 till December 9, 1925 he was the head of the Russian Orthodox Church, serving as the patriarchal locum tenens. Despite his imprisonment, he remained technically locum tenens until his death in 1937.

He is considered as a saint hieromartyr by the Russian Orthodox Church.

== Early life ==
Peter was born in the village of Storozhevoye of the Korotoyaksky Uyezd of the Voronezh Governorate of the Russian Empire (now Ostrogozhsky District, Voronezh Oblast, Russia) to the family of a parish priest.

In 1875, he entered the Kostroma Theological College, from which he graduated in 1879 and entered the Voronezh Theological Seminary, from which he graduated in 1885 with the first degree. In 1892 he was graduated from the Moscow Theological Academy. He remained in the academy in the position of Assistant Dean of Students ("Inspector") and in 1897 he defended his Master's thesis.

Upon graduation, Polyansky did not seek an ordained ministry, but rather for the most of his life, he served as a layman in various official ecclesiastical establishments. From 1906 to 1918, Polyansky worked at the Education Committee of the Most Holy Synod of the Russian Orthodox Church, by 1915 becoming Secretary, with the rank of "Active State Councillor" (Действительный статский советник), Class IV on the Russian Table of Ranks, equivalent to the rank of Major General in the Imperial Russian Army), serving as Inspector of all theological schools of the Russian Orthodox Church. His duties required him to travel extensively, and during this time, he developed a close acquaintance with the future Patriarchs Tikhon (Bellavin) and Sergius (Stragorodsky).

== After the Bolshevik Revolution ==
When the Education Committee was closed down in 1918, in the aftermath of the Bolshevik Russian Revolution, Polyansky worked in the apparatus of the All-Russian Council of 1917–1918 in Moscow. In 1920, when the tide of anti-religious policies of Soviet government was rising rapidly, he was asked by Patriarch Tikhon to do another important service to the Church – to accept monastic tonsure and the episcopacy, in order to assist Tikhon in the administration of the Church. After the request was made, he was reported as saying: "If I refuse, I will be a traitor of the Church; but I am aware that by accepting this offer, I am signing my own death sentence."

Peter was tonsured a monk by Metropolitan Sergius (Stragorodsky) and quickly advanced through the clerical ranks to be consecrated as Bishop of Podolsk by Patriarch Tikhon on October 8, 1920. Almost immediately, he was arrested and spent 1920–1923 in exile in Veliky Ustiug. Upon his return from exile in 1923, Bishop Peter became one of the prominent members of church government and a close ally of Patriarch Tikhon. In 1923 he was elevated to the rank of archbishop and in 1924 became a Metropolitan of Krutitsy – an ancient see within Moscow, which became a titular see since 1919

On December 25, 1924, Patriarch Tikhon made a secret "will" where he designated three possible successors to the Patriarchal Throne upon his death. This step was clearly unforeseen either by the church canons or the Statutes of the Russian Church, but was dictated by the circumstances under which a proper Patriarchal election by an independent church council was impossible. In his will, Tikhon named three candidates: Metropolitan Kirill (Smirnov) of Kazan, Metropolitan Agathangel (Preobrazhensky) of Yaroslavl and Metropolitan Peter (Polyansky) of Krutitsy. Since Peter was the only candidate who was not in prison or exile at the time, on April 12, 1925 (the day of Tikhon's funeral), he was confirmed as the Patriarchal locum tenens.

== Locum tenens ==
Upon assuming the duties of locum tenens, Metropolitan Peter came under intense pressure from the Soviet government and secret services, trying to persuade him to reconcile with the pro-Soviet Renovationist schism calling itself the "Living Church" and to express unconditional loyalty to the Soviet state. While Peter agreed with the need for Orthodox Soviet citizens to be politically loyal, he regarded any reconciliation with the Living Church to be possible only on the condition of the schismatics' repentance. On July 28, 1925, Peter issued a "Letter" to his flock where he confirmed the Church's position with respect to Renovationists. In response, Renovationists accused Peter of conspiring with the Russian emigres in the West and thus contributed to Peter's arrest.

Foreseeing his imminent imprisonment, Peter followed Tikhon's example in selecting three candidates, one of whom would assume the responsibilities of Patriarchal locum tenens in the event of Peter's arrest. The latter followed on December 10, 1925, and his duties passed onto Metropolitan Sergius (Stragorodsky) who became Deputy locum tenens, with Peter as a nominal head of the Church. Peter would spend the rest of his life in exile and prisons, weakened by the harsh conditions and harassed by Soviet authorities.

== Imprisonment and death ==
In November 1926, Peter was sentenced to three-year exile to the Ural region, which in May 1928 was extended to two more years. His exile by no means implied his lack of involvement in the church affairs – thus, in December 1929, he sent a letter to Metropolitan Sergius, reprimanding him for exceeding his powers as a "deputy", and reminding him that he, Peter, is still technically the head of the Church.

In 1930, Peter was arrested again. After rejecting the offers to resign his position and to become a GPU agent, he was sentenced to five years of hard labor. Some time before the sentencing, Peter suffered a partial paralysis caused by the harsh prison conditions. He spent the years 1931 to 1937 in solitary confinement in the Verkhneuralsk prison. In July 1936, his confinement was extended to three more years, while Metropolitan Sergius was given a false report of Peter's death and therefore assumed the full leadership of the Russian Orthodox Church with the consent of their supporters, but only as a locum tenens, because authority doesn't allow him to convene a council for the purpose of electing the patriarch.

On October 2, 1937, the NKVD troika for Chelyabinsk Oblast sentenced Metropolitan Peter to death. He was executed by shooting at 4 p.m. on October 10, 1937, and buried in the city of Magnitogorsk, Chelyabinsk region.

Metropolitan Peter of Krutitsy was canonized as Hieromartyr by the decision of Hierarchical Council of the Russian Orthodox Church on February 23, 1997. His feast day is celebrated on the anniversary of his death, October 10 (N.S.).

== Sources ==
- Vladislav Tsypin. History of the Russian Orthodox Church 1917-1997 (in Russian))
