= Studyonovka, Ertilsky District, Voronezh Oblast =

Studyonovka Студёновка
- Settlement
- Location within Voronezh Oblast Location within Russia
- Coordinates: 51°53′N 40°40′E
- Country: Russia
- Region: Voronezh Oblast
- District: Ertilsky District
- Time zone: UTC+3:00

Studyonovka (Russian: Студёновка) is a rural locality (a settlement) in Yacheyskoye Rural Settlement, Ertilsky District, Voronezh Oblast, Russia. The population was 16 as of 2010.

== Geography ==
Studyonovka is located 17 km northwest of Ertil (the district's administrative centre) by road. Golevka is the nearest rural locality.
