= Stepan Povetkin =

Soviet lieutenant general (1895–1965)

Stepan Ivanovich Povetkin
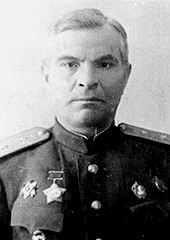
- Born: 15 August 1895; Russkaya Zhuravka, Pavlovsky Uyezd, Voronezh Governorate, Russian Empire
- Died: 1 May 1965 (aged 69) Moscow, Soviet Union
- Allegiance: Russian Empire; Russian SFSR; Soviet Union
- Branch: Imperial Russian Army; Red Army
- Service years: 1915–1917; 1918–1946
- Rank: Lieutenant general
- Commands: 85th Rifle Division; 51st Rifle Corps; 47th Rifle Corps; 6th Rifle Corps (became 19th Guards Rifle Corps)
- Conflicts: World War I; Russian Civil War; World War II
- Awards: Order of Lenin (2); Order of the Red Banner; Order of Suvorov, 2nd class; Order of the Patriotic War, 1st class

Stepan Ivanovich Povetkin (Russian: Степа́н Ива́нович Пове́ткин; 15 August 1895 – 1 May 1965) was a Red Army lieutenant general.

Conscripted into the Imperial Russian Army during World War I, Povetkin rose from private to ensign during the war. Joining the Red Army during the Russian Civil War, he served as a junior commander and held command positions stationed in the North Caucasus during the 1920s and early 1930s. Povetkin rose to division and then corps command by the late 1930s. At the outbreak of Operation Barbarossa he commanded the 47th Rifle Corps in Belarus and was severely wounded in the first month of the war. He returned to the front in late 1941 as an army deputy commander and in 1942–1943 commanded a corps before becoming deputy commander of the Belorussian Military District. Relieved of this post in early 1945 for drunkenness and neglecting his duties, he briefly returned to the front as a corps deputy commander and retired shortly after the end of the war.

== Early life, World War I, and Russian Civil War ==
Born to a peasant family on 15 August 1895 in the village of Russkaya Zhuravka, Pavlovsky Uyezd, Voronezh Governorate, Povetkin completed primary school. Conscripted into the Imperial Russian Army in 1915 during World War I, he was sent to the 9th Infantry Regiment on the Southwestern Front as a ryadovoy. Graduating from the regimental training detachment in 1916, Povetkin served successively as a squad leader, platoon leader, and company commander, rising to the rank of praporshchik.

After being demobilized, in February 1918, Povetkin became a platoon leader in the Red Guard detachment of the liquidation commission in Kaluga. Joining the Red Army in May 1918 during the Russian Civil War, he became a pre-conscription training instructor at the Zhuravsky District Military Commissariat. Serving there for more than a year, Povetkin was sent to a combat unit in April 1919, serving as a junior commander in the separate sapper company of the Boguchar Rifle Regiment on the Southern Front.

He was evacuated to a hospital in Penza and treated there from September 1919, returning to the Southern Front in April 1920 to become a squad leader and assistant platoon commander in the 1st Shock Regiment of the Exemplary Separate Rifle Brigade. In May of that year Povetkin was transferred to the 10th Rifle Regiment of the 2nd Don Rifle Division, with which he served as a platoon commander and acting training battalion detachment commander before becoming a company commander in October. During the war, Povetkin fought in actions against the Armed Forces of South Russia, the Army of Wrangel, and the Revolutionary Insurrectionary Army of Ukraine.

== Interwar period ==
After the end of the war, in April 1921, Povetkin became a cadet of the repeat department of the Krasnodar Infantry Courses, and upon graduation returned to the 2nd Don Rifle Division, part of the North Caucasus Military District in Novocherkassk. He served as a battalion and company commander with the 10th Rifle Regiment, then as a platoon commander in the 4th Rifle Regiment. From July 1922, Povetkin was assistant chief and chief of the machine gun detachments of the 25th and 27th Rifle Regiments of the 9th Don Rifle Division (the renumbered 2nd Don Rifle Division) in Rostov-on-Don. He studied at the Vystrel course from October 1924 and upon graduation in 1925 served with the 64th Rifle Regiment of the 22nd Krasnodar Rifle Division in Armavir as commander of the regimental school and machine gun detachment. Povetkin was transferred to the Vladikavkaz Infantry School in January 1926, serving as commander of machine gun company and a first-year cadet company with the school. He became a member of the Communist Party of the Soviet Union in 1927.

Transferred to the 74th Rifle Division of the North Caucasus Military District in September 1931, Povetkin served as assistant commander for personnel of the 220th and 221st Rifle Regiments of the division, and in January 1933 became commander of the 221st Regiment. In August 1934 he became head of the military department at the Rostov College of Physical Education, and from November 1936 commanded a battalion at the Leningrad Military-Political School. In January 1937 he became a course leader at the Vystrel courses, simultaneously studying at the courses between November 1937 and January 1938. Upon his second graduation from the Vystrel courses, Povetkin was appointed commander of the 85th Rifle Division of the Ural Military District in Chelyabinsk in July 1938, then in August of the same year commander of the 51st Rifle Corps of the same district at Molotov, following his promotion to kombrig on 15 July. Povetkin received a further promotion to komdiv on 4 November 1939 and transferred to the 4th Army of the Western Special Military District in July 1940 to command its 47th Rifle Corps. Just before this relocation, Povetkin became a major general when the Red Army reintroduced general officer rank on 4 June 1940.

== World War II ==
After the beginning of the German invasion of the Soviet Union, Operation Barbarossa, Povetkin led the corps in the Battle of Białystok–Minsk, during which it fought against superior German forces in the Brest region, then retreated towards Kobryn and Bobruisk. On 27 June the Soviet defenders of Bobruisk, a roughly 4,000-man consolidated detachment commanded by Povetkin, were forced to retreat from the city, but managed to blow up the bridge over the Berezina. In July, during the First Battle of Smolensk, the corps defended positions on the left bank of the Sozh near Propoysk. In the fighting, Povetkin was seriously wounded and evacuated to Moscow for hospitalization. After recovering, in December, he was appointed deputy commander for the rear of the 31st Army of the Kalinin Front. After holding that position for almost a year, Povetkin was given command of the 6th Rifle Corps of the 41st Army of the same front. He led the corps as it defended positions west of Bely and fought in the Rzhev–Vyazma Offensive. For its actions, the corps became the 19th Guards Rifle Corps on 19 April 1943, which Povetkin continued to command as part of the 10th Guards Army of the Western Front. Promoted to lieutenant general on 28 April, he led it in the Spas-Demensk Offensive and the Yelnya–Dorogobuzh Offensive during the Second Battle of Smolensk.

Povetkin served as deputy commander for the troops of the Belorussian Military District from November 1943. He was relieved of his post on 27 February 1945 by a directive of the People's Commissar of Defense, charged with habitual drunkenness, drinking with subordinates, and shirking his responsibility of supervising combat training in the district. After being at the disposal of the Main Personnel Directorate for several weeks, he was appointed deputy commander of the 38th Guards Rifle Corps of the 9th Guards Army in April. In the final stages of the war he fought with the corps in the Vienna Offensive and the Prague Offensive, ending the war on the Elbe.

== Postwar ==
After the end of the war, Povetkin continued as deputy commander of the 38th Guards Rifle Corps. He was discharged from active duty in August 1946, and died in Moscow on 1 May 1965.

== Awards and honors ==
Povetkin was a recipient of the following decorations:

- Order of Lenin (2)
- Order of the Red Banner
- Order of Suvorov, 2nd class
- Order of the Patriotic War, 1st class
