= Ertil (inhabited locality) =

Ertil (Russian: Эртиль) is the name of several inhabited localities in Russia.

Urban localities

- Ertil, Voronezh Oblast, a town in Ertilsky District, Voronezh Oblast

Rural localities

- Ertil, Tambov Oblast, a village in Troitskoroslyaysky Selsoviet of Tokaryovsky District of Tambov Oblast
