= Povetkin =

Povetkin (masculine, Russian: Поветкин) or Povetkina (feminine, Russian: Поветкина) is a Russian surname. Notable people with the surname include:

- Alexander Povetkin (born 1979), Russian boxer
- Stepan Povetkin (1895–1965), Soviet general
