= Zemlyansky Uyezd =

Zemlyansky Uyezd (Землянский уезд) was one of the subdivisions of the Voronezh Governorate of the Russian Empire. It was situated in the northwestern part of the governorate. Its administrative centre was Zemlyansk.

== Demographics ==
At the time of the Russian Empire Census of 1897, Zemlyansky Uyezd had a population of 200,736. Of these, 96.2% spoke Russian and 3.7% Ukrainian as their native language.
