= Bityug (disambiguation) =

The Bityug is a river in Voronezh Oblast, Russia.

Bityug may also refer to several rural localities in Russia:

- Bityug, Kursk Oblast, a village in 2-y Ponyrovsky Selsoviet of Ponyrovsky District of Kursk Oblast
- Bityug, Tula Oblast, a settlement in Krasnodubrovsky Rural Okrug of Volovsky District of Tula Oblast
- Bityug, Voronezh Oblast, a settlement in Khlebenskoye Rural Settlement of Novousmansky District of Voronezh Oblast
