= Korotoyak =

Korotoyak (Russian: Коротояк) is the name of several rural localities in Russia:

- Korotoyak, Altai Krai, a selo in Korotoyaksky Selsoviet of Khabarsky District in Altai Krai; 53°45′N 79°40′E
- Korotoyak, Voronezh Oblast, a selo in Korotoyakskoye Rural Settlement of Ostrogozhsky District in Voronezh Oblast
