= Dobrovsky District =

Dobrovsky District Добровский район (Russian)
- District
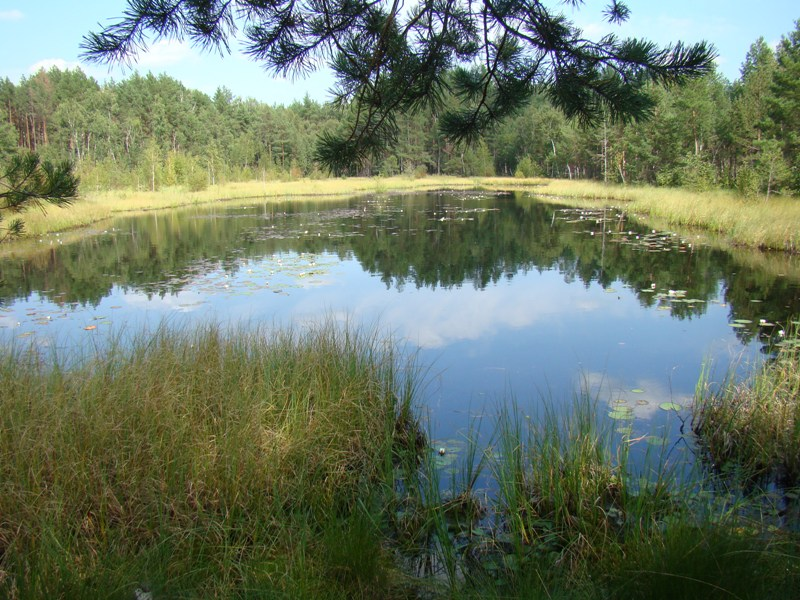
- Lake in Dobrovsky District

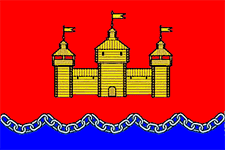
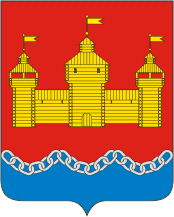
- Flag Coat of arms
- Location of Dobrovsky District in Lipetsk Oblast
- Coordinates: 52°51′37″N 39°48′34″E
- Country: Russia
- Federal subject: Lipetsk Oblast
- Established: 30 July 1928
- Administrative center: Dobroye

Area
  - Total: 1,326.4 km^{2} (512.1 sq mi)

Population (2010 Census)
  - Total: 24,228
  - Density: 18.266/km^{2} (47.309/sq mi)
  - Urban: 0%
  - Rural: 100%

Administrative structure
  - Administrative divisions: 17 selsoviet
  - Inhabited localities: 45 rural localities

Municipal structure
  - Municipally incorporated as: Dobrovsky Municipal District
  - Municipal divisions: 0 urban settlements, 17 rural settlements
- Time zone: UTC+3 (MSK)
- OKTMO ID: 42615000
- Website: http://www.admdobroe.ru/

Dobrovsky District (Russian: До́бровский райо́н) is an administrative and municipal district (raion), one of the eighteen in Lipetsk Oblast, Russia. It is located in the east of the oblast. The area of the district is 1,326.4 square kilometers (512.1 sq mi). Its administrative center is the rural locality (a selo) of Dobroye. Population: 26,837 (2021 census); 24,228 (2010 census); 26,821 (2002 Census); 28,723 (1989 Soviet census). The population of Dobroye accounts for 24.2% of the district's total population.
