= Korotoyaksky Uyezd =

Subdivision of Voronezh Governate, Russian Empire

Korotoyaksky Uyezd (Коротоякский уезд) was one of the subdivisions of the Voronezh Governorate of the Russian Empire. It was situated in the western part of the governorate. Its administrative centre was Korotoyak.

== Demographics ==
At the time of the Russian Empire Census of 1897, Korotoyaksky Uyezd had a population of 157,189. Of these, 83.8% spoke Russian, 16.1% Ukrainian and 0.1% Romani as their native language.
