= Sukharev =

Sukharev or Suharev (Russian: Сухарев) is a Russian masculine surname, its feminine counterpart is Sukhareva or Suhareva. It may refer to:

- Alexandru Suharev (born 1970), Moldovan football player
- Dmitry Sukharev (biologist) (1930–2024), Soviet and Russian biologist, poet, and bard
- Grunya Sukhareva (1891–1981), Russian child psychiatrist
- Ivan Sukharev (born 1978), Russian politician
- Maria Sukhareva, Russian correspondence chess player
- Olga Sukhareva (born 1963), Russian correspondence chess player
- Sergei Sukharev (born 1987), Russian football player
- Victoria Sukhareva (born 1990), Russian acrobatic gymnast
- Vladimir Sukharev (1924–1997), Soviet sprinter

== See also ==
- Sukharev Tower in Moscow, Russia
