= Biryuchensky Uyezd =

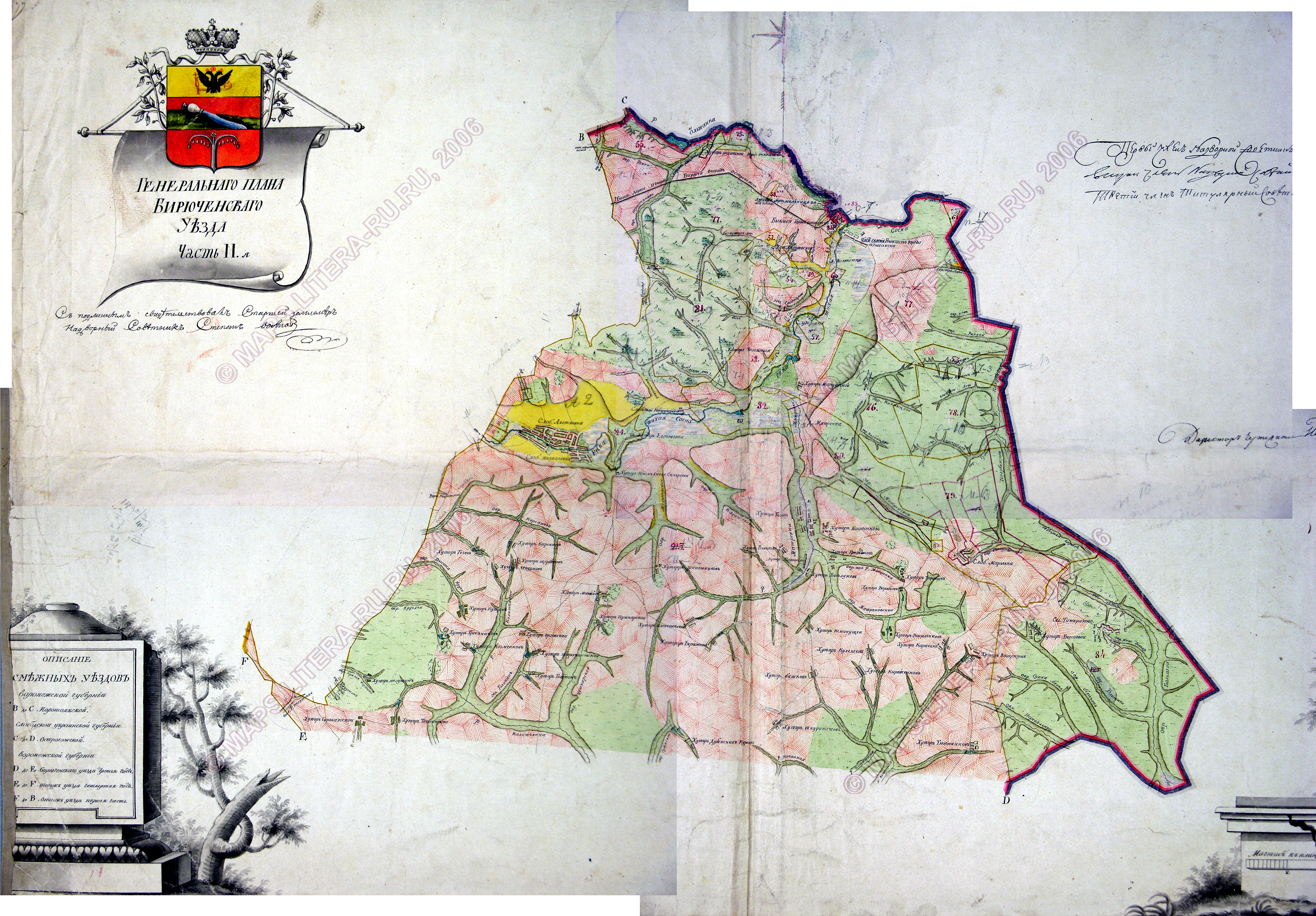
1792 map of the Uyezd

Biryuchensky Uyezd (Бирюченский уезд) was one of the subdivisions of the Voronezh Governorate of the Russian Empire. It was situated in the southwestern part of the governorate. Its administrative centre was Biryuch.

== Demographics ==
At the time of the Russian Empire Census of 1897, Biryuchensky Uyezd had a population of 200,668. Of these, 70.2% spoke Ukrainian, 29.2% Russian and 0.5% Belarusian as their native language.
