= Nizhnedevitsk, Novoolshanskoye Rural Settlement, Nizhnedevitsky District, Voronezh Oblast =

Nizhnedevitsk Нижнедевицк
- Settlement
- Location within Voronezh Oblast Location within Russia
- Coordinates: 51°41′N 38°19′E
- Country: Russia
- Region: Voronezh Oblast
- District: Nizhnedevitsky District
- Time zone: UTC+3:00

Nizhnedevitsk (Russian: Нижнедевицк) is a rural locality (a settlement) in Novoolshanskoye Rural Settlement, Nizhnedevitsky District, Voronezh Oblast, Russia. The population was 870 as of 2010. There are 16 streets.

== Geography ==
Nizhnedevitsk is located 19 km north of Nizhnedevitsk (the district's administrative centre) by road. Polyana is the nearest rural locality.
