= Voronezhsky Uyezd =

Administrative division of Russian Empire

Voronezhsky Uyezd (Воронежский уезд) was one of the subdivisions of the Voronezh Governorate of the Russian Empire. It was situated in the northern part of the governorate. Its administrative centre was Voronezh.

== Demographics ==
At the time of the Russian Empire Census of 1897, Voronezhsky Uyezd had a population of 273,832. Of these, 98.3% spoke Russian, 0.5% Yiddish, 0.4% Polish, 0.4% Ukrainian and 0.2% German as their native language.
