= Kadomsky Uyezd =

Subdivision of the eighteenth-century Russian empire

Kadomsky Uyezd (Russian: Кадомский уезд) was one of the subdivisions of the Tambov Governorate of the Russian Empire in 1779–1796. Its administrative centre was Kadom.

== History ==
31 December 1796 Kadomsky uyezd was disestablished, Kadom became a city in Temnikovsky Uyezd.
