= 47th Rifle Corps =

- Allegiance: Soviet Union
- Branch: Soviet Red Army
- Engagements: Eastern Front (World War II); Operation Barbarossa

The 47th Rifle Corps was a corps of the Red Army of the Soviet Union. It took part in World War II.

The corps headquarters was established in the summer of 1939. It took part in the Winter War.

By June 1941, the corps was located in Bobruisk, almost fully equipped and manned. But the separate communications battalion only had 40–50% of its communications equipment and vehicles, and the 47th corps aviation squadron was only 47% equipped.

On the eve of Operation Barbarossa, the German invasion of the Soviet Union, the corps is listed as being directly subordinate to the Western Special Military District, and comprising the 55th, 121st, and 143rd Rifle Divisions.

Soon after the invasion, the WSMD became the Western Front. The corps was resubordinated to the 4th Army by 1 July 1941. Later it was withdrawn into Front reserve in the area east of Gomel, and on 14 July, the corps headquarters was placed under the High Command ("Главного командования") directly, and the corps' divisions reallocated elsewhere. The First Formation of the corps was active as part of the 'operational army' (active and fighting) from June 22 to July 22, 1941.

== Commanders ==
- Ivan Dashichev (August 1939 - July 1940)
- Major General Stepan Povetkin (08.07.1940 - 01.08.1941)
