= Tavrovo =

Tavrovo Таврово
- Selo
- Flag Seal

- Location within Belgorod Oblast Location within Russia
- Coordinates: 50°30′N 36°34′E
- Country: Russia
- Region: Belgorod Oblast
- District: Belgorodsky District
- Time zone: UTC+3:00

Tavrovo (Russian: Таврово) is a rural locality (a selo) and the administrative center of Tavrovskoye Rural Settlement, Belgorodsky District, Belgorod Oblast, Russia. Population: 13,592 (2021 census); 5,192 (2010 census).

== Geography ==
Tavrovo is located 17 km east of Maysky (the district's administrative centre) by road. Dubovoye is the nearest rural locality.
