= Maria Sukhareva =

Russian chess player

Maria Aleksandrovna Sukhareva is a Russian chess player who earned the correspondence chess titles of Lady International Master (LIM) in 2013 and Lady Grandmaster (LGM) in 2014. She is known for being a contender for the ninth Ladies World Correspondence Chess Championship.
