= Pavlovsky Uyezd, Voronezh Governorate =

Subdivision of Voronezh Governorate, Russian Empire

Pavlovsky Uyezd Павловский уезд
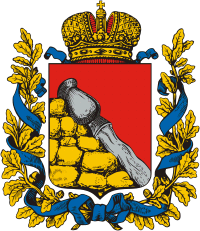
- Coat of arms

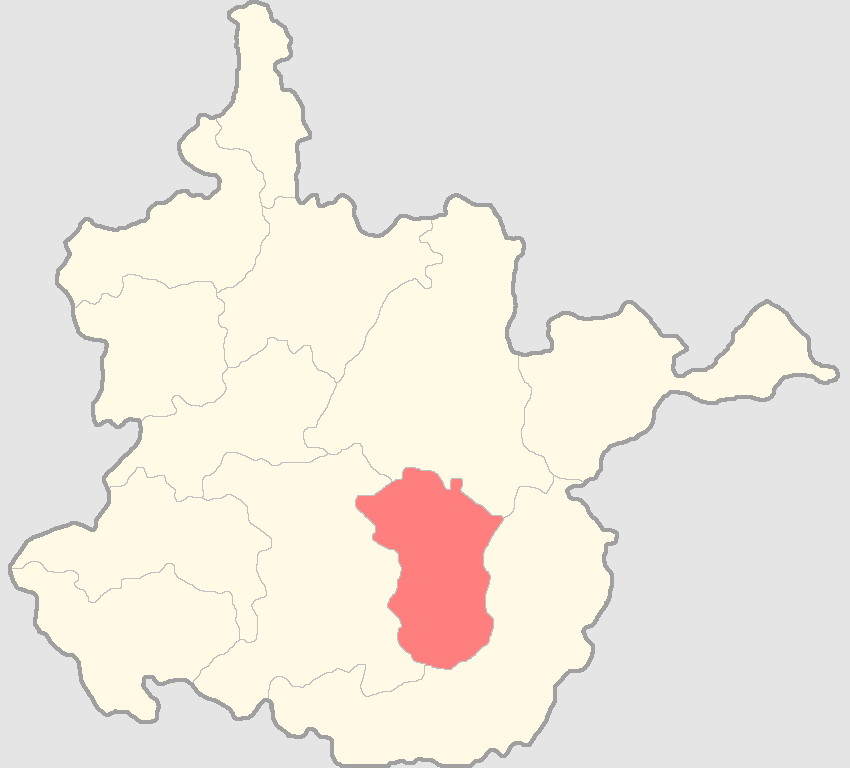
- Country: Russia
- Political status: Uyezd
- Region: Voronezh Governorate
- Established: 1779
- Abolished: 1924

Area
  - Total: 4,204 km^{2} (1,623 sq mi)

Population (1897)
  - Total: 157,365
  - Density: 37.43/km^{2} (96.95/sq mi)

Pavlovsky Uyezd (Russian: Павловский уезд) was an uyezd of Voronezh Governorate in the Russian Empire. It was situated in the central part of the governorate. Its administrative centre was Pavlovsk.

== History ==
The uyezd was established in 1779 when Voronezh Governorship, which became Voronezh Governorate in 1796, was created. It was abolished on 12 May 1924 and its territory divided between Bobrovsky and Bogucharsky uyezds.

== Demographics ==
At the time of the Russian Empire Census of 1897, Pavlovsky Uyezd had a population of 157,365. Of these, 57.8% spoke Russian, 42.0% Ukrainian, 0.1% Belarusian and 0.1% Yiddish as their native language.
