= Lenino, Lipetsk Oblast =

Village in Russia

Coordinates: 52°31′03″N 39°30′14″E

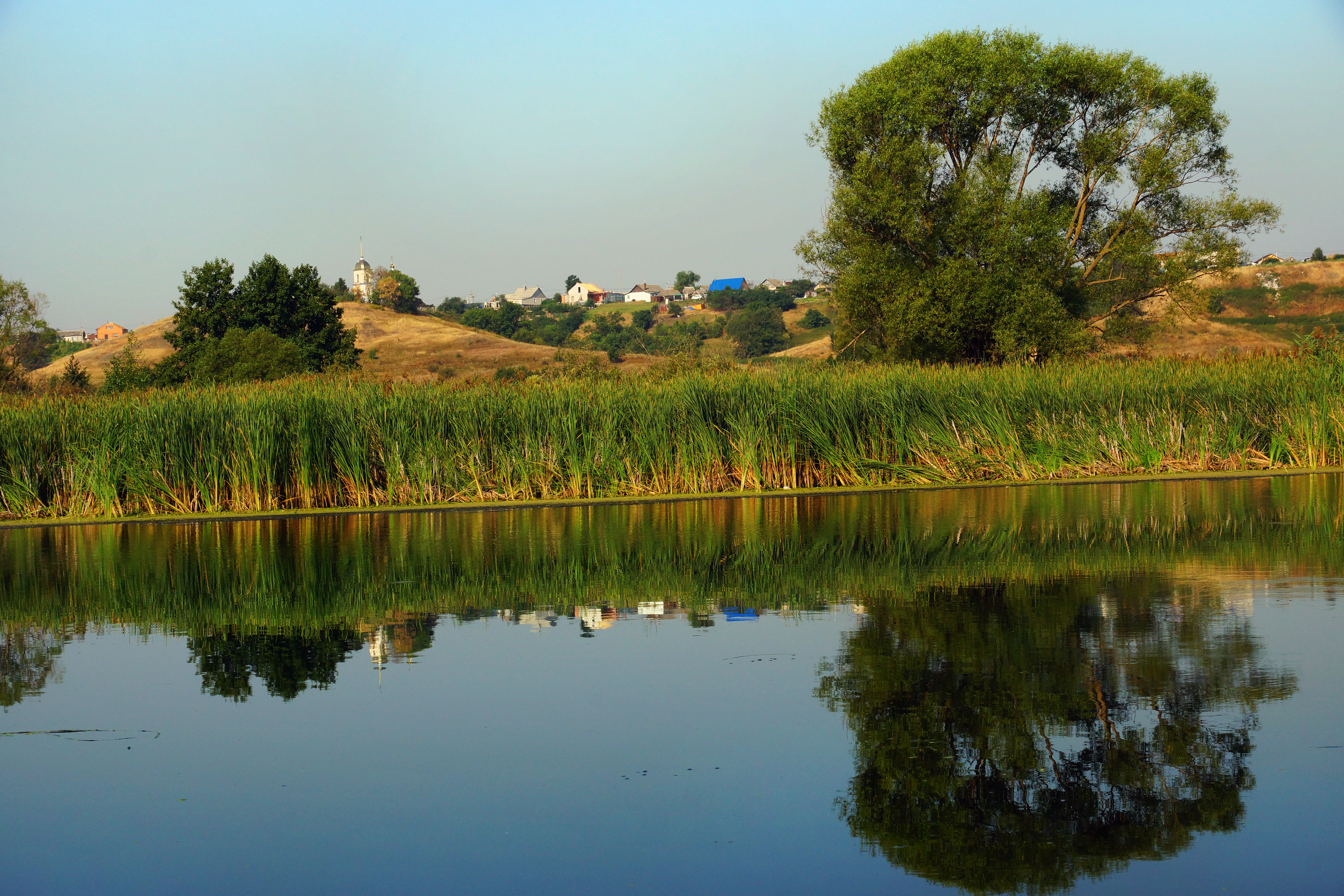
View of Lenino

Lenino (Russian: Ле́нино) is a village (selo) in Lipetsky District of Lipetsk Oblast, Russia, located on the right bank of the Voronezh River.

Romanovo Gorodishche (Романово-Городище). In 1614, boyar Ivan Romanov built a built an ostrog (fortified wooden fort) here, and the village became known as the town of Romanov.

In the 18th century, the town was transformed into the village of Romanovo. In 1920, it was renamed Lenino (in honor of Vladimir Lenin).

There were plans to build a satellite town of Romanov near the south-western border of Lipetsk. The territory of this planned town, at approximately 5,700 hectares (22 mi^{2}) with a population of 130,000, will include the territory of Lenino.
