= Valuysky Uyezd =

Valuysky Uyezd (Russian: Валуйский уезд; Ukrainian: Валуйський повіт, romanized: Valuiskyi povit) was one of the subdivisions of the Voronezh Governorate of the Russian Empire. It was situated in the southwestern part of the governorate. Its administrative centre was Valuyki.

== Demographics ==
At the time of the Russian Empire Census of 1897, Valuysky Uyezd had a population of 188,113. Of these, 51.1% spoke Ukrainian, 48.6% Russian, 0.1% Romani and 0.1% Yiddish as their native language.
