= Verkhososna =

Verkhososna Верхососна
- Selo
- Location within Belgorod Oblast Location within Russia
- Coordinates: 50°43′N 38°14′E
- Country: Russia
- Region: Belgorod Oblast
- District: Krasnogvardeysky District
- Time zone: UTC+3:00

Verkhososna (Russian: Верхососна) is a rural locality (a selo) and the administrative center of Verkhnesosenskoye Rural Settlement, Krasnogvardeysky District, Belgorod Oblast, Russia. The population was 1,069 as of 2010. There are 14 streets.

== Geography ==
Verkhososna is located 23 km (14 mi) northwest of Biryuch (the district's administrative centre) by road. Zavalskoye is the nearest rural locality.
