= Verkhny Olshan =

Verkhny Olshan Верхний Ольшан
- Selo
- Location within Voronezh Oblast Location within Russia
- Coordinates: 50°46′N 38°53′E
- Country: Russia
- Region: Voronezh Oblast
- District: Ostrogozhsky District
- Time zone: UTC+3:00

Verkhny Olshan (Russian: Верхний Ольшан) is a rural locality (a selo) in Olshanskoye Rural Settlement, Ostrogozhsky District, Voronezh Oblast, Russia. The population was 167 as of 2010. There are 5 streets.

== Geography ==
Verkhny Olshan is located 19 km southwest of Ostrogozhsk (the district's administrative centre) by road. Veretye is the nearest rural locality.
