= Russkaya Zhuravka =

Rural locality in Verkhnemamonsky District, Voronezh Oblast, Russia

Coordinates: 50°21′09″N 40°32′59″E

Russkaya Zhuravka (Russian: Рýсская Журáвка) is a rural locality (a selo) in Verkhnemamonsky District of Voronezh Oblast in Russia, the administrative center of the Russko-Zhuravsky Rural Settlement. According to the Russian Census of 2010, Russkaya Zhuravka had 1,779 inhabitants.
