= Troitsk, Mordovia =

Troitsk Троицк
- Rural locality

Other transcription(s)
  - Moksha: Тройця
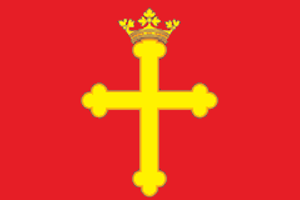
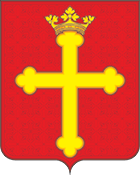
- Flag Coat of arms
- Interactive map of Troitsk
- Location of Troitsk Troitsk (Republic of Mordovia)
- Country: Russia
- Federal subject: Mordovia
- Administrative district: Kovylkinsky

Population (2010 Census)
  - Total: 1,610
  - Estimate (2010): 1,610 (0%)

Municipal status
  - Municipal district: Kovylkinsky
  - Rural settlement: Troitskoye Rural Settlement
- Time zone: UTC+3 (MSK)
- Postal code: 431320
- OKTMO ID: 89629483101

Troitsk (Russian: Тро́ицк; Moksha: Тройця, Trojtsä) is a rural locality (a selo) in Kovylkinsky District of the Republic of Mordovia, Russia.

== History ==
Troitsk was founded in the 17th century as a fortress. During the Stepan Razin rebellion, Troitsk was a rebels' stronghold. From 1780 to 1798 Troitsk was an uyezd center of the Penza Governorate, after which it became a supernumerary town in Krasnoslobodsky Uyezd, ultimately losing town status in 1925.

Population: 1,610 (2010 census); 1,677 (2002 census); 5,822 (1897 Census).
