= Nizhnedevitsky Uyezd =

Nizhnedevitsky Uyezd Нижнедевицкий уезд
- Uezd of Russian Empire and RSFSR
- 1779–1928
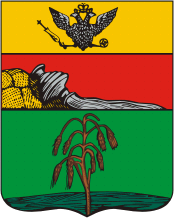
- Coat of arms

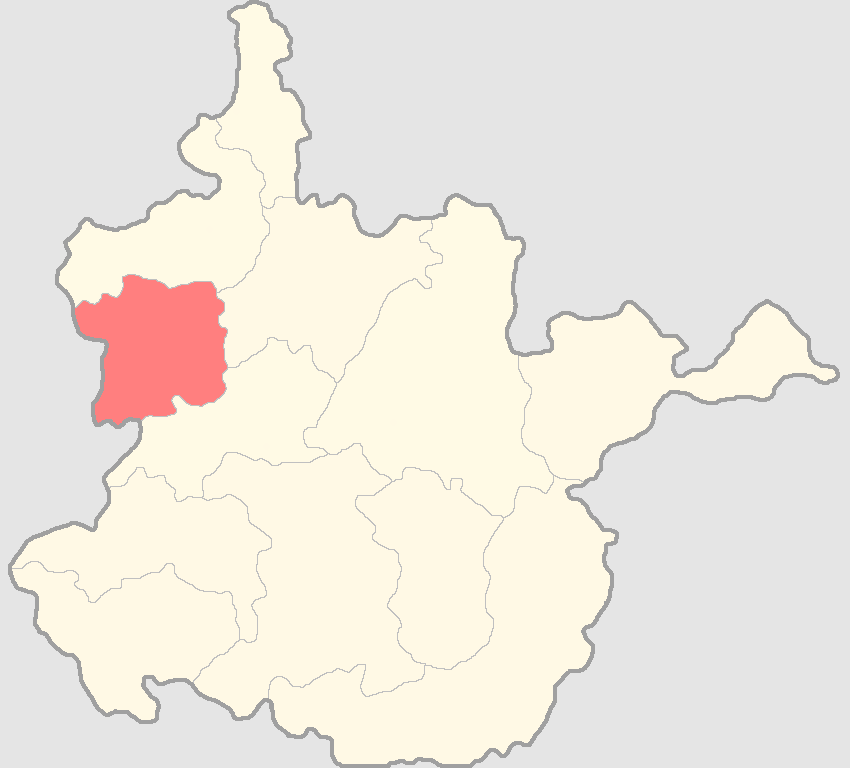
- Nizhnedevitsky Uyezd in Voronezh Governorate
- Capital: Nizhnedevitsk
- Area
  - 1897: 3,742 km^{2} (1,445 sq mi)
- Population
  - 1897: 167,183
- History
  - Established: 1779
  - Disestablished: 1928

Nizhnedevitsky Uyezd (Russian: Нижнедевицкий уезд) was one of the subdivisions of the Voronezh Governorate of the Russian Empire. It was situated in the northwestern part of the governorate. Its administrative centre was Nizhnedevitsk.

== Demographics ==
At the time of the Russian Empire Census of 1897, Nizhnedevitsky Uyezd had a population of 167,183. Of these, 98.9% spoke Russian and 1.1% Ukrainian as their native language.
