= Dobroye, Lipetsk Oblast =

Rural locality in Lipetsk Oblast, Russia

Coordinates: 52°51′30″N 39°49′36″E

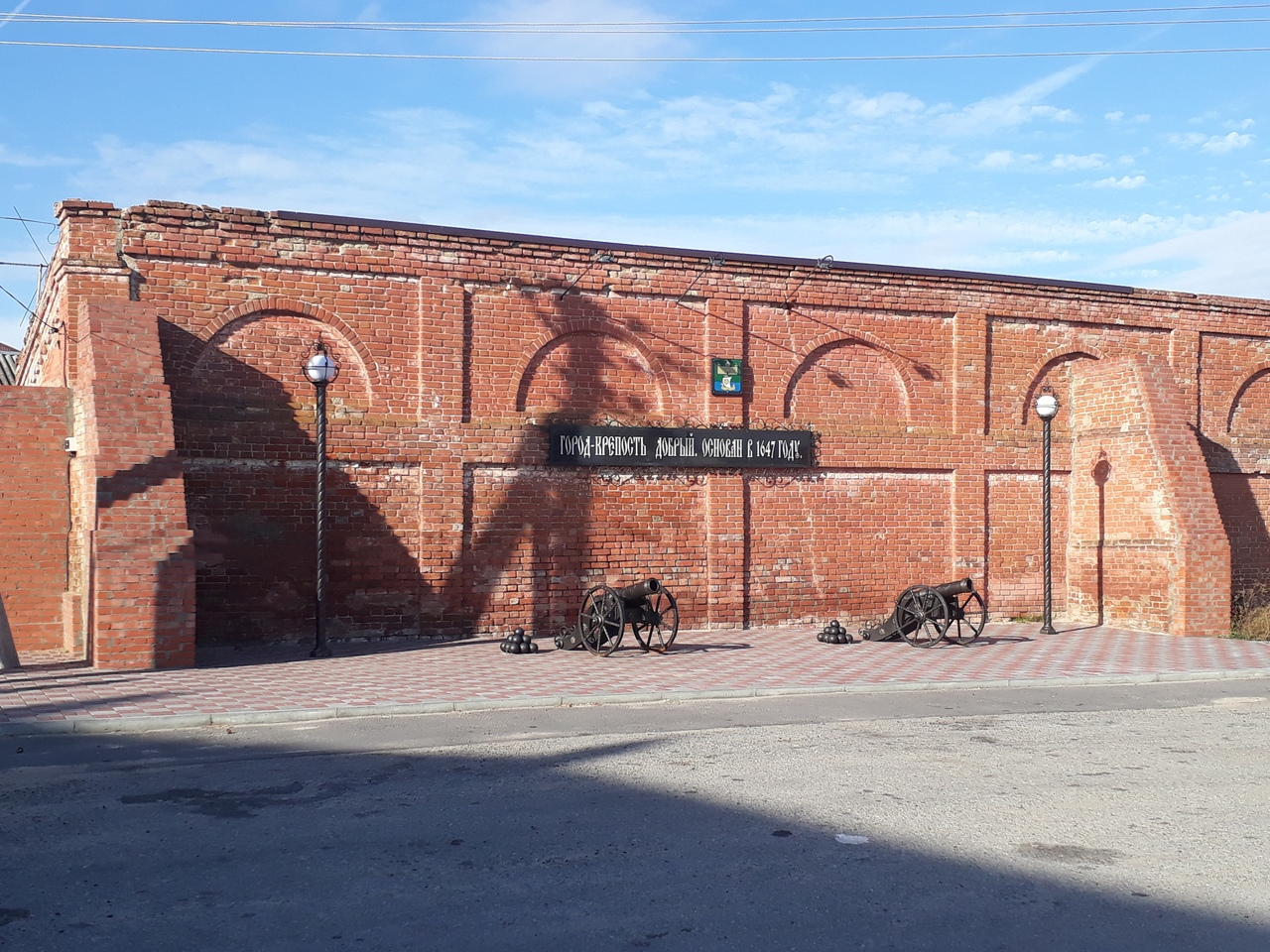
The estate wall of Count Shatilov in Dobroye

Dobroye (Russian: Доброе) is a rural locality (a selo) and the administrative center of Dobrovsky District, Lipetsk Oblast, Russia. Population: 6,482 (2021 census); 5,445 (2010 census); 5,600 (2002 census); 6,547 (1989 Soviet census).
