= Narovchat =

Set index of articles associated with the same name

Narovchat (Russian: Наровчат) is the name of several rural localities in Penza Oblast, Russia:

- Narovchat, Narovchatsky District, Penza Oblast, a selo in Narovchatsky Selsoviet of Narovchatsky District
- Narovchat, Tamalinsky District, Penza Oblast, a village in Volche-Vrazhsky Selsoviet of Tamalinsky District
