= Korotoyak, Altai Krai =

Korotoyak Коротояк
- Selo
- Location within Altai Krai Location within Russia
- Coordinates: 53°45′N 79°40′E
- Country: Russia
- Region: Altai Krai
- District: Khabarsky District

Population
  - Total: 1,090
- Time zone: UTC+7:00

Korotoyak (Russian: Коротояк) is a rural locality (a selo) and the administrative center of Korotoyaksky Selsoviet, Khabarsky District, Altai Krai, Russia. The population was 1,090 as of 2013. It was founded in 1913. There are 12 streets.

== Geography ==
Korotoyak is located 21 km northeast of Khabary (the district's administrative centre) by road. Tselinny is the nearest rural locality.

== Demographics ==
As of 2013, the population of Korotoyak was 1,090.
