= Temnikovsky Uyezd =

Temnikovsky Uyezd (Темниковский уезд) was one of the subdivisions of the Tambov Governorate of the Russian Empire. It was situated in the northeastern part of the governorate. Its administrative centre was Temnikov.

== Demographics ==
At the time of the Russian Empire Census of 1897, Temnikovsky Uyezd had a population of 138,350. Of these, 71.8% spoke Russian, 23.8% Mordvin and 4.3% Tatar as their native language.

== See also ==
- Temnikovsky District
