= Narovchatsky District =

Narovchatsky District Наровчатский район (Russian)
- District
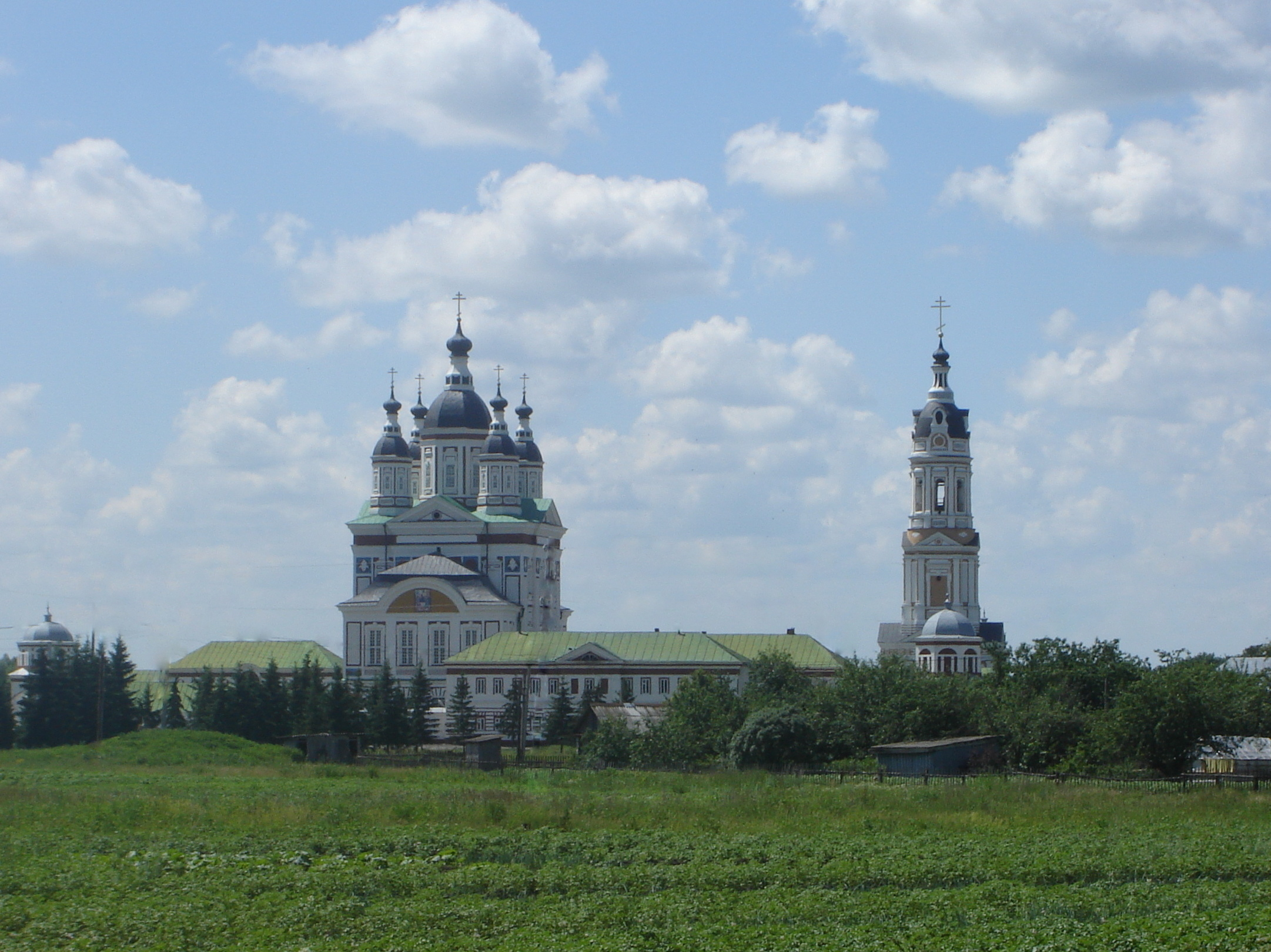
- Trinity Monastery, NArovchatsky District

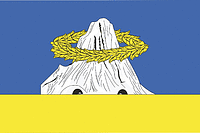
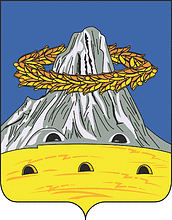
- Flag Coat of arms
- Location of Narovchatsky District in Penza Oblast
- Coordinates: 53°52′52″N 43°41′48″E
- Country: Russia
- Federal subject: Penza Oblast
- Established: 16 July 1928
- Administrative center: Narovchat

Area
  - Total: 956.9 km^{2} (369.5 sq mi)

Population (2010 Census)
  - Total: 12,069
  - Density: 12.61/km^{2} (32.67/sq mi)
  - Urban: 0%
  - Rural: 100%

Administrative structure
  - Administrative divisions: 13 selsoviet
  - Inhabited localities: 46 rural localities

Municipal structure
  - Municipally incorporated as: Narovchatsky Municipal District
  - Municipal divisions: 0 urban settlements, 13 rural settlements
- Time zone: UTC+3 (MSK)
- OKTMO ID: 56647000
- Website: http://rnarov.pnzreg.ru/

Narovchatsky District (Russian: Наровча́тский райо́н) is an administrative and municipal district (raion), one of the twenty-seven in Penza Oblast, Russia. It is located in the northwest of the oblast. The area of the district is 956.9 square kilometers (369.5 sq mi). Its administrative center is the rural locality (a selo) of Narovchat. Population: 12,069 (2010 Census); 13,839 (2002 census); 15,718 (1989 Soviet census). The population of Narovchat accounts for 34.8% of the district's total population.
