= Bityug =

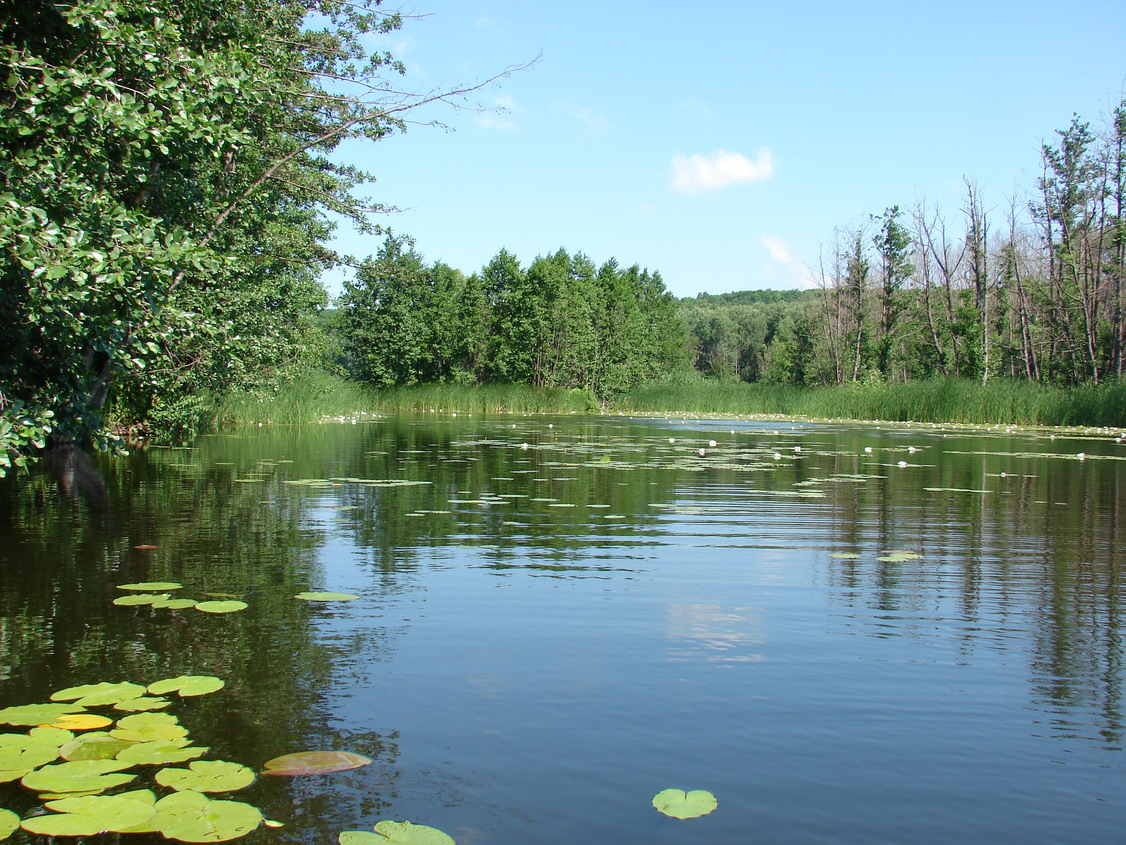
- Native name: Битюг (Russian)

Location
- Country: Russia

Physical characteristics
- Mouth: Don
  - coordinates: 50°37′33″N 39°55′18″E
- Length: 379 km (235 mi)
- Basin size: 8,840 km^{2} (3,410 sq mi)

Basin features
- Progression: Don→ Sea of Azov
- Tributaries
  - left: Ertil

The Bityug (Russian: Битюг) is a river in Voronezh Oblast, Russia, a left tributary of the Don. Its upper reaches are located in Tambov Oblast. The Bityug is 379 kilometres (235 mi) long, with a basin of 8,840 square kilometres (3,410 mi^{2}). There are more than 400 lakes in the Bityug basin. The river freezes up in mid-December and stays icebound until late March or early April.
