= Korotoyak, Voronezh Oblast =

Rural locality in Ostrogozhsky District, Voronezh Oblast, Russia

Coordinates: 50°59′N 39°11′E

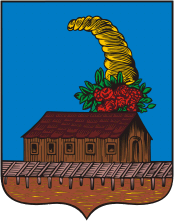
The coat of arms of Korotoyak was adopted in 1781

Korotoyak (Russian: Коротояк) is a rural locality (a selo) in Ostrogozhsky District of Voronezh Oblast, Russia, located on the right bank of the Don River. Population: 1,904 (2010).

It was established in 1642 as one of the forts in the Belgorod Defensive Line. The name is derived from the Korotoyachka River which enters the Don nearby. Korotoyak was incorporated as a town in 1779. Some of the first Russian warships were built in Korotoyak ca. 1700. Peter the Great is known to have inspected the local shipbuilding yard in person.

Korotoyak served as the administrative center of an uyezd until 1923 and the administrative center of a district in 1923–1961.
