= Ertil (river) =

- Native name: Эртиль (Russian)

Location
- Country: Russia
- Region: Voronezh Oblast, Tambov Oblast

Physical characteristics
- Source
  - elevation: 180 m (590 ft)
- Mouth: Bityug
  - coordinates: 51°46′27″N 40°29′52″E
  - elevation: 107 m (351 ft)
- Length: 92 km (57 mi)
- Basin size: 931 km^{2} (359 sq mi)

Basin features
- Progression: Bityug→ Don→ Sea of Azov

The Ertil (Russian: Эртиль) is a river within the basin of the Don in Voronezh Oblast and Tambov Oblast, Russia. It is 92 kilometres (57 mi) long, and has a drainage basin of 931 square kilometres (359 sq mi). The Ertil is a left tributary of the Bityug.
