= Nizhnedevitsk, Nizhnedevitskoye Rural Settlement, Nizhnedevitsky District, Voronezh Oblast =

Rural locality in Voronezh Oblast, Russia

Coordinates: 51°32′41″N 38°21′55″E

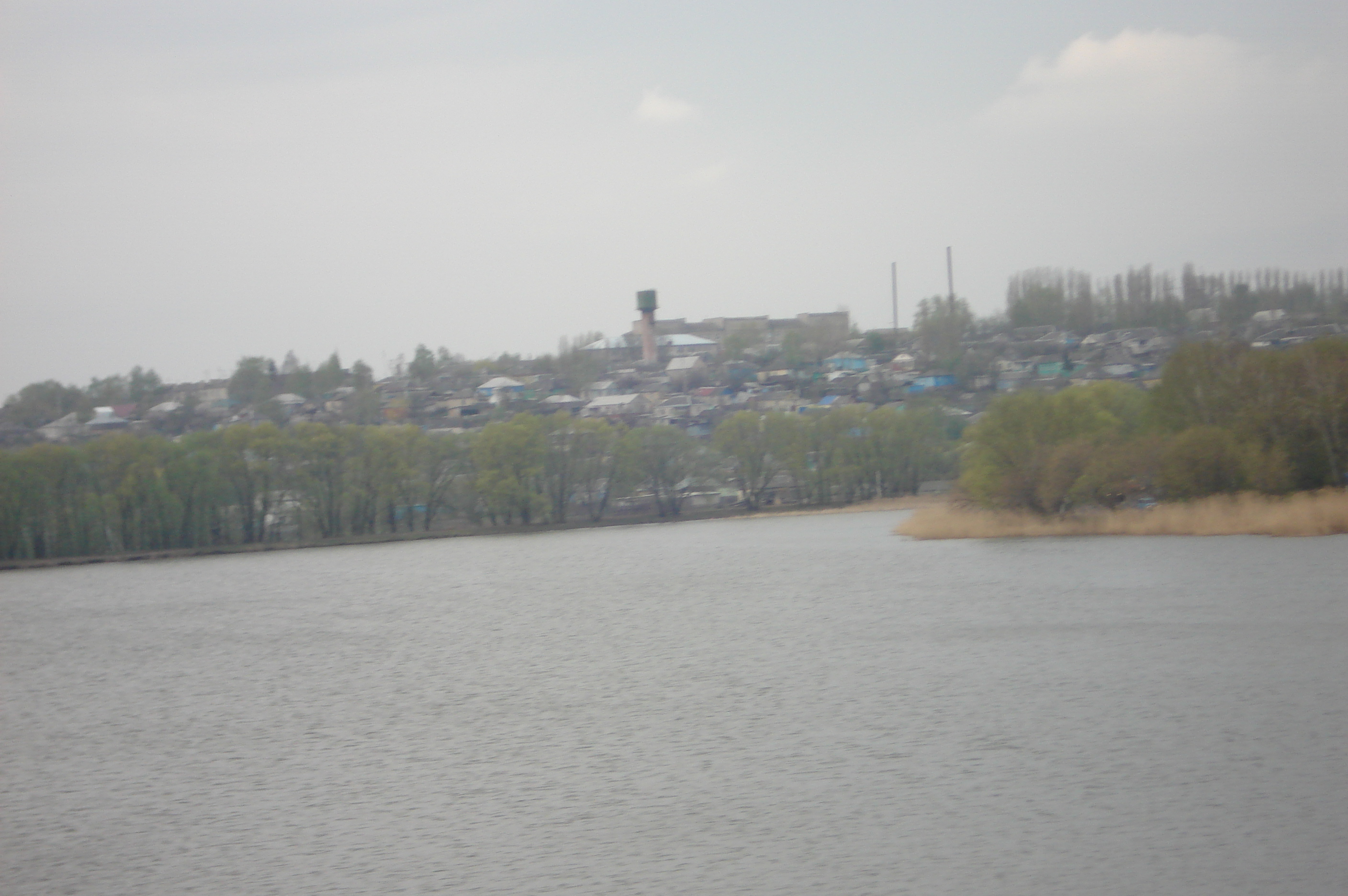
Panorama of Nizhnedevitsk

Nizhnedevitsk (Russian: Нижнеде́вицк) is a rural locality (a selo) and the administrative center of Nizhnedevitsky District of Voronezh Oblast, Russia. Population: 5,460 (2021 census); 5,839 (2010 census); 6,409 (2002 census); 6,736 (1989 Soviet census).

== History ==
Nizhnedevitsk was founded in late 17th century by settlers from Zemlyansk and Stary Oskol. In 1779 it was granted town rights and became seat of Nizhnedevitsky Uyezd. Under the new division, administrative buildings from the abolished town of Kostensk were relocated there. The proximity of such large cities as Voronezh and Stary Oskol did not allow Nizhnedevitsk to develop into a commercial or industrial center. In 1928, after the uyezd was abolished, Nizhnedevitsk lost its town status and became a selo, or village.

There is an eponymous settlement 19 km to the north, which emerged around Nizhnedevitsk railway station.
