= Ostrogozhsky Uyezd =

Ostrogozhsky Uyezd (Острогожский уезд) was one of the subdivisions of the Voronezh Governorate of the Russian Empire. It was situated in the southern part of the governorate. Its administrative centre was Ostrogozhsk.

== Demographics ==
At the time of the Russian Empire Census of 1897, Ostrogozhsky Uyezd had a population of 273,837. Of these, 90.3% spoke Ukrainian, 8.4% Russian, 0.6% Belarusian, 0.4% German, 0.1% Romani and 0.1% Yiddish as their native language.
