= Zemlyansk =

Zemlyansk Землянск
- Selo
- Location within Voronezh Oblast Location within Russia
- Coordinates: 51°53′N 38°43′E
- Country: Russia
- Region: Voronezh Oblast
- District: Semiluksky District
- Time zone: UTC+3:00

Zemlyansk (Russian: Земля́нск) is a rural locality (a selo) and the administrative center of Zemlyanskoye Rural Settlement, Semiluksky District, Voronezh Oblast, Russia. The population was 3,276 (2021 census); 3,043 as of 2010. There are 37 streets.

== Geography ==
Zemlyansk is located 36 km northwest of Semiluki (the district's administrative centre) by road. Dolgoye is the nearest rural locality.
