= Nizhnedevitsky District =

Nizhnedevitsky District Нижнедевицкий район (Russian)
- District
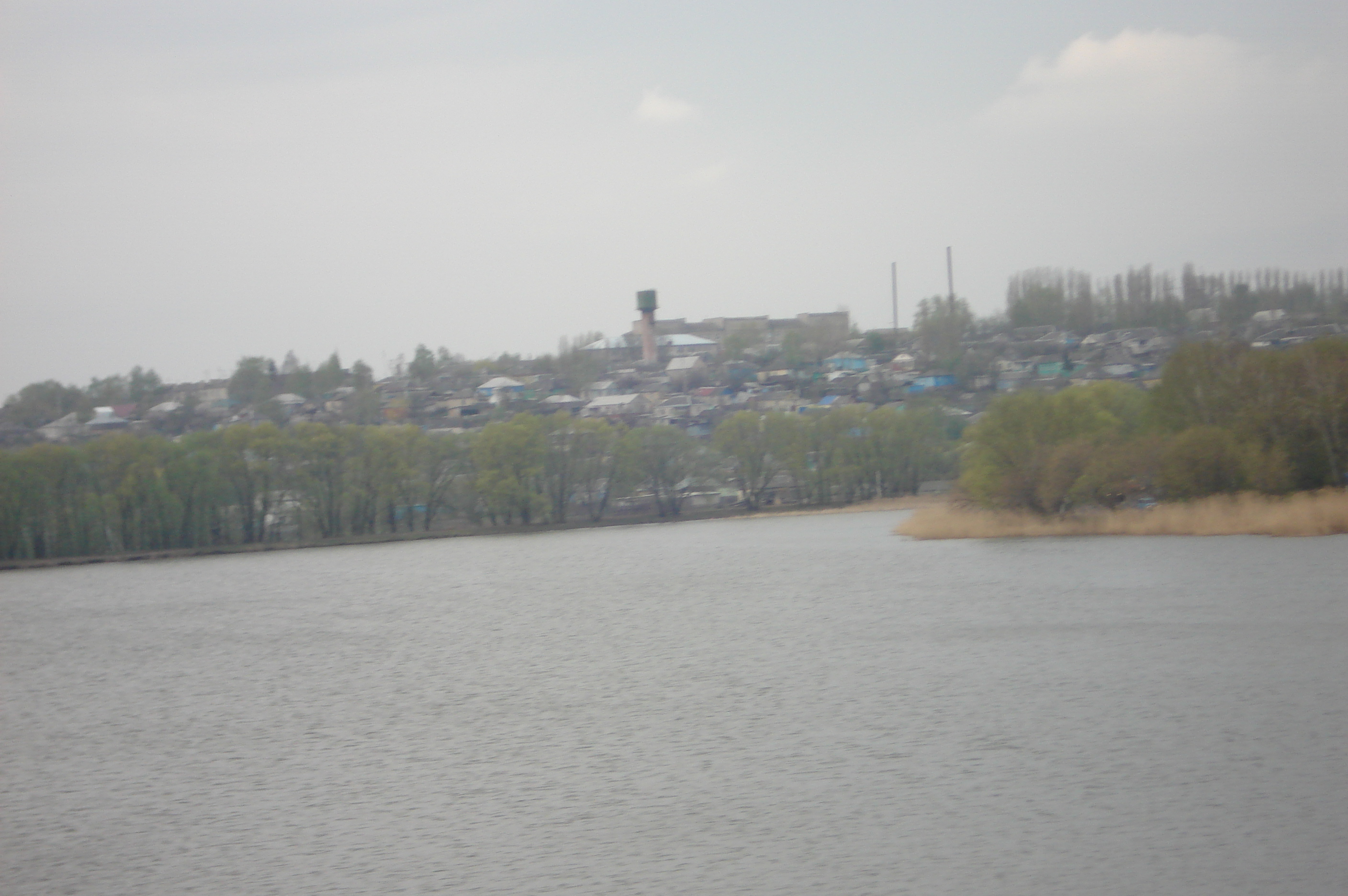
- Nizhnedevitsk, Nizhnedevitsky District

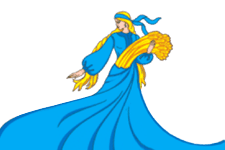
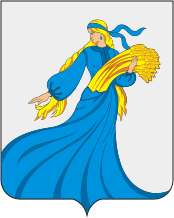
- Flag Coat of arms
- Location of Nizhnedevitsky District in Voronezh Oblast
- Coordinates: 51°32′54″N 38°22′07″E
- Country: Russia
- Federal subject: Voronezh Oblast
- Established: 14 May 1928
- Administrative center: Nizhnedevitsk

Area
  - Total: 1,196 km^{2} (462 sq mi)

Population (2010 Census)
  - Total: 20,611
  - Density: 17.23/km^{2} (44.63/sq mi)
  - Urban: 0%
  - Rural: 100%

Administrative structure
  - Administrative divisions: 15 Rural settlements
  - Inhabited localities: 51 rural localities

Municipal structure
  - Municipally incorporated as: Nizhnedevitsky Municipal District
  - Municipal divisions: 0 urban settlements, 15 rural settlements
- Time zone: UTC+3 (MSK)
- OKTMO ID: 20623000
- Website: http://www.nizhnedevick.ru/

Nizhnedevitsky District (Russian: Нижнеде́вицкий райо́н) is an administrative and municipal district (raion), one of the thirty-two in Voronezh Oblast, Russia. It is located in the northwest of the oblast. The area of the district is 1,196 square kilometers (462 sq mi). Its administrative center is the rural locality (a selo) of Nizhnedevitsk. Population: 17,938 (2021 census); 20,611 (2010 census); 24,077 (2002 census); 29,577 (1989 Soviet census). The population of the administrative center accounts for 30.4% of the district's total population.
