= Ertilsky District =

Ertilsky District Эртильский район (Russian)
- District
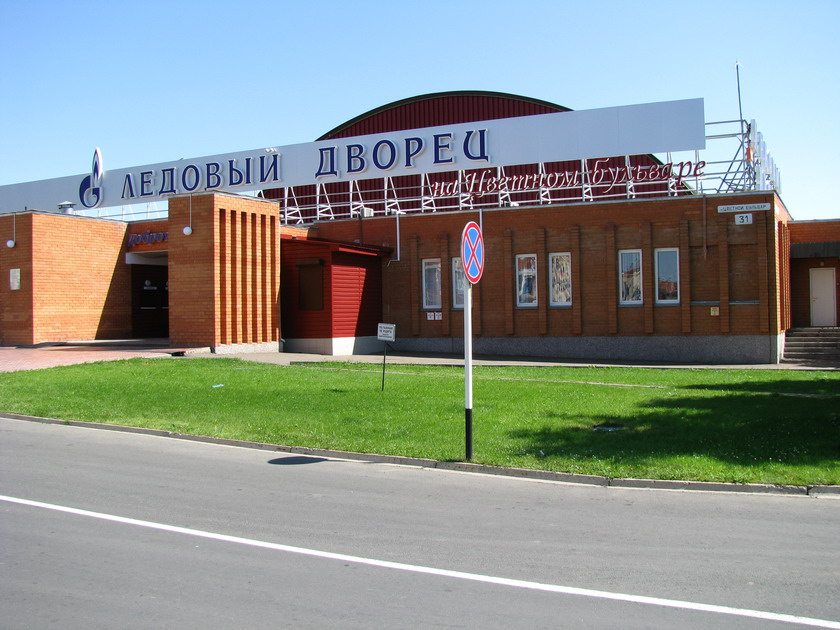
- Ice Palace in Rostoshi, Ertilsky District

- Flag Coat of arms
- Location of Ertilsky District in Voronezh Oblast
- Coordinates: 51°50′N 40°48′E
- Country: Russia
- Federal subject: Voronezh Oblast
- Established: 1938
- Administrative center: Ertil

Area
  - Total: 1,457.81 km^{2} (562.86 sq mi)

Population (2010 Census)
  - Total: 25,728
  - Density: 17.648/km^{2} (45.709/sq mi)
  - Urban: 44.3%
  - Rural: 55.7%

Administrative structure
  - Administrative divisions: 1 Urban settlements, 13 Rural settlements
  - Inhabited localities: 1 urban-type settlements, 62 rural localities

Municipal structure
  - Municipally incorporated as: Ertilsky Municipal District
  - Municipal divisions: 1 urban settlements, 13 rural settlements
- Time zone: UTC+3 (MSK)
- OKTMO ID: 20658000
- Website: http://www.govertil.ru/

Ertilsky District (Russian: Эрти́льский райо́н) is an administrative and municipal district (raion), one of the thirty-two in Voronezh Oblast, Russia. It is located in the north of the oblast. The area of the district is 1,457.81 square kilometers (562.86 sq mi). Its administrative center is the town of Ertil. Population: 20,865 (2021 census); 25,728 (2010 census); 31,499 (2002 census); 36,054 (1989 Soviet census). The population of Ertil accounts for 48.0% of the district's total population.
