= Ertil, Voronezh Oblast =

Town in Voronezh Oblast, Russia

Ertil Эртиль
- Town
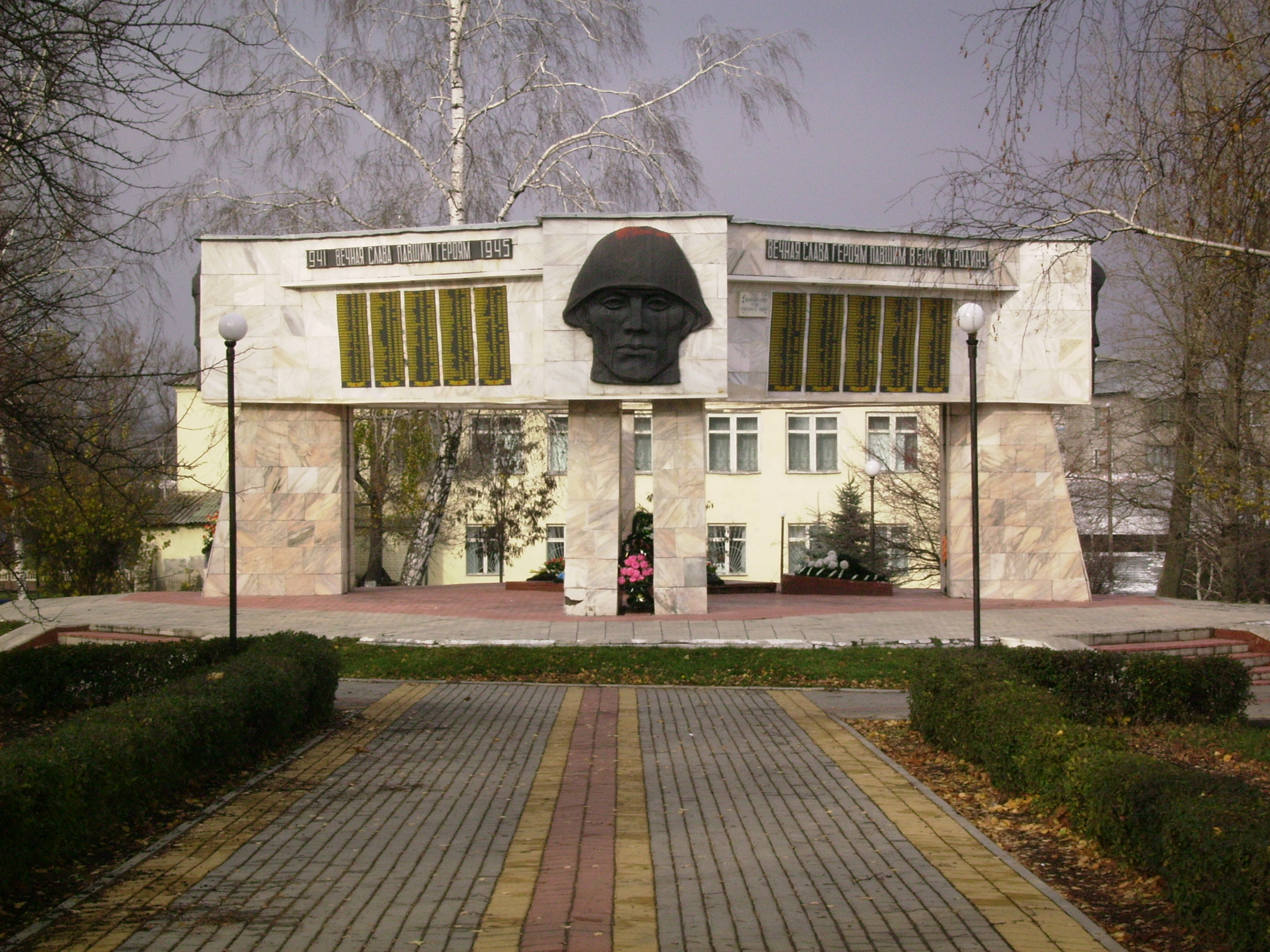

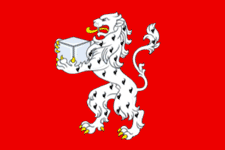
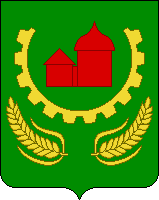
- Flag Coat of arms
- Interactive map of Ertil
- Location of Ertil Ertil (Voronezh Oblast)
- Coordinates: 51°51′N 40°48′E
- Country: Russia
- Federal subject: Voronezh Oblast
- Administrative district: Ertilsky District
- Urban settlementSelsoviet: Ertil
- Founded: 1897
- Town status since: 1963
- Elevation: 140 m (460 ft)

Population (2010 Census)
  - Total: 11,387
  - Estimate (2025): 9,666 (−15.1%)

Administrative status
  - Capital of: Ertilsky District, Ertil Urban Settlement

Municipal status
  - Municipal district: Ertilsky Municipal District
  - Urban settlement: Ertil Urban Settlement
  - Capital of: Ertilsky Municipal District, Ertil Urban Settlement
- Time zone: UTC+3 (MSK)
- Postal codes: 397030–397033, 397039
- OKTMO ID: 20658101001

Ertil (Russian: Эртиль) is a town and the administrative center of Ertilsky District in Voronezh Oblast, Russia, located on the Ertil River (Don's basin), 145 kilometers (90 mi) east of Voronezh, the administrative center of the oblast. Population: 10,024 (2021 census); 11,387 (2010 census); 12,885 (2002 census); 14,144 (1989 Soviet census).

== History ==
It was founded in 1897 as a settlement around a sugar plant. It was granted town status in 1963.

== Administrative and municipal status ==
Within the framework of administrative divisions, Ertil serves as the administrative center of Ertilsky District. As an administrative division, it is, together with eight rural localities in Ertilsky District, incorporated within Ertilsky District as Ertil Urban Settlement. As a municipal division, this administrative unit also has urban settlement status and is a part of Ertilsky Municipal District.

== Culture ==
There is a museum of local lore in the town.
