= Constantin Westchiloff =

Russian-American painter (1878–1945)

- Константин Вещилов
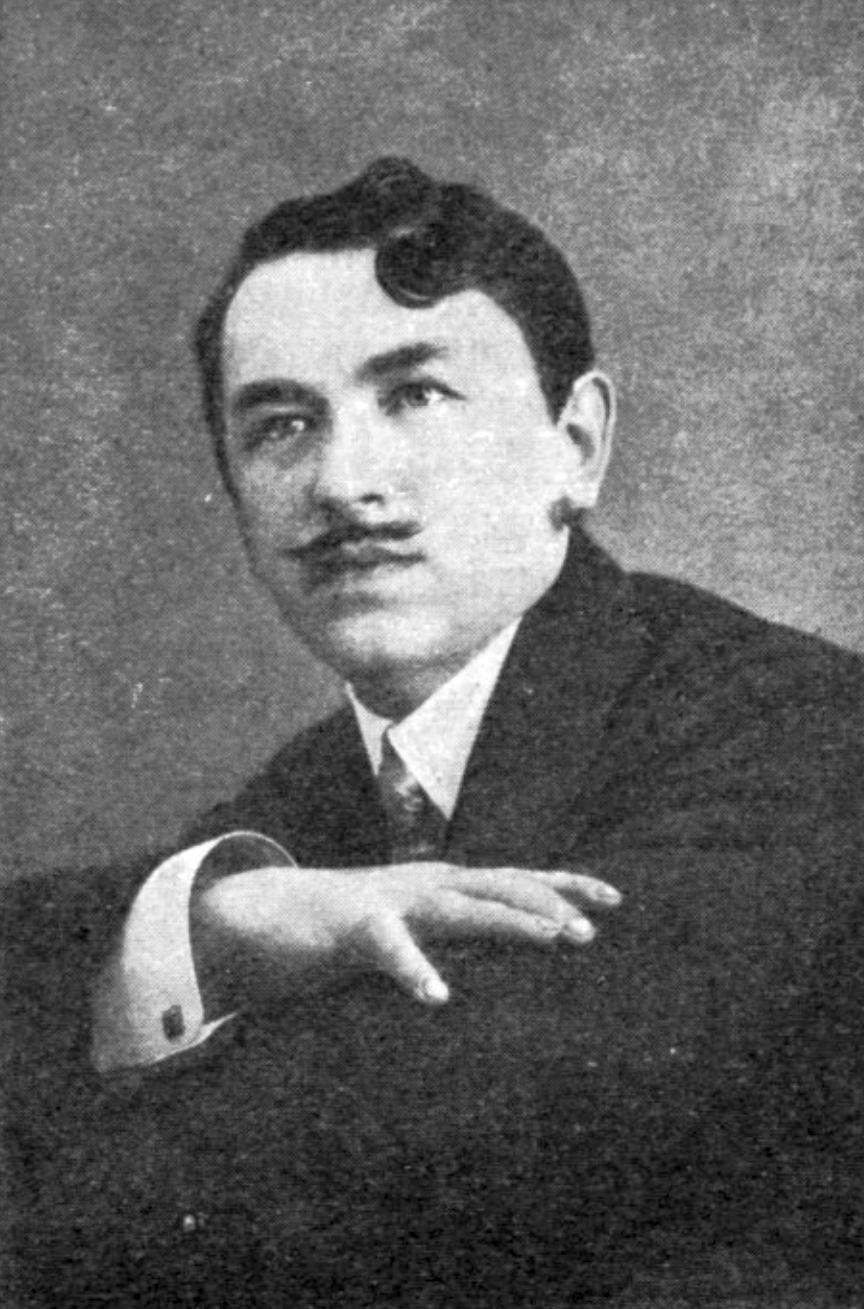
- Featured in the magazine Ogonyok, Issue No. 50, 1911
- Born: Konstantin Aleksandrovich Veshchilov; 27 May 1878; Saint Petersburg, Russian Empire
- Died: 23 April 1945 (aged 66); New York City, U.S.
- Resting place: Mount Olivet Cemetery, Maspeth, Queens, New York
- Education: Imperial Academy of Arts

Constantin Alexandrovich Westchiloff (Russian: Константин Александрович Вещилов, romanized: Konstantin Aleksandrovich Veshchilov; 27 May [O.S. 15 May] 1878 – 23 April 1945) was a Russian-American painter and set designer known for his portraits, landscapes, seascapes, and historical scenes. In 1922, he moved to Western Europe and adopted the latinized spelling of his name.

== Early life ==
Westchiloff was born on 27 May [O.S. 15 May] 1878 in Saint Petersburg, Russian Empire, into a merchant family, the son of Alexander and Anna Veshchilov. (Note: Some Western reference works and posthumous municipal records erroneously list his birth as November 1877, 28 May 1878 (arising from a 13-day Gregorian calendar conversion error), or 5 December 1878.)

== Training ==
Westchiloff received his first art lessons at Valaam Monastery under Father Luke, who directed the painting of the monastery's main cathedral. In 1893, at age fifteen, Westchiloff entered the Drawing School of the Imperial Society for the Encouragement of the Arts in St. Petersburg, studying there until 1896. From 1896 to 1898, he trained under Ilya Repin at the art school established by Princess Maria Tenisheva.

Between 1898 and 1904, Westchiloff continued his studies under Repin at the Imperial Academy of Arts. Repin singled out Westchiloff as one of his favorite personal pupils. During this period, Westchiloff lived with fellow impoverished student I. M. Tryapichnikov in Repin's studio apartment at the master's expense. Westchiloff spent summers practicing plein-air painting at Repin's dacha; an 1898 sketch by Repin depicts Westchiloff, Tryapichnikov, and Repin's son Yuri working en plein air.

In November 1904, Westchiloff graduated from the Imperial Academy with a gold medal for his canvas Ivan the Terrible after the Kazan Victories. The award conferred upon him the title of artist and a one-year travelling fellowship to Italy starting on 1 January 1905 at state expense.

== Career ==
=== Russia ===
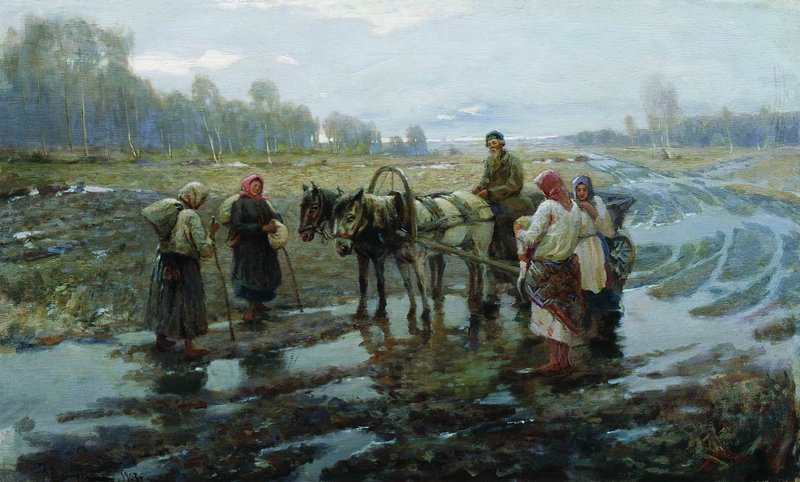
Constantin Alexandrovich Westchiloff, On the Way, 1903, Perm State Art Gallery, Perm, Russia

In 1902, with Repin's recommendation, Westchiloff was commissioned to paint a large diorama, The Founding of St. Petersburg, for the city's 1903 bicentennial celebrations. That same year, he began showing portraits and genre paintings at exhibitions in Moscow and St. Petersburg. His 1903 canvas On the Way is representative of his early genre scenes.

In 1904, Westchiloff became a regular exhibitor with the Society of Russian Watercolors. Following the death of painter Vasily Vereshchagin in April 1904 aboard the battleship Petropavlovsk during the Russo-Japanese War, Westchiloff took over several commissions for the Russian Admiralty.

In 1905, he received the A. I. Kuindzhi Prize for Forgiveness Sunday in Russia in the 17th Century. While on his travelling fellowship in Italy and France, he began Julius Caesar: The Last Entrance to the Senate. The Imperial Academy extended his fellowship through 1906 to allow him to complete the canvas, but declined his request for an additional year to study in Norway.

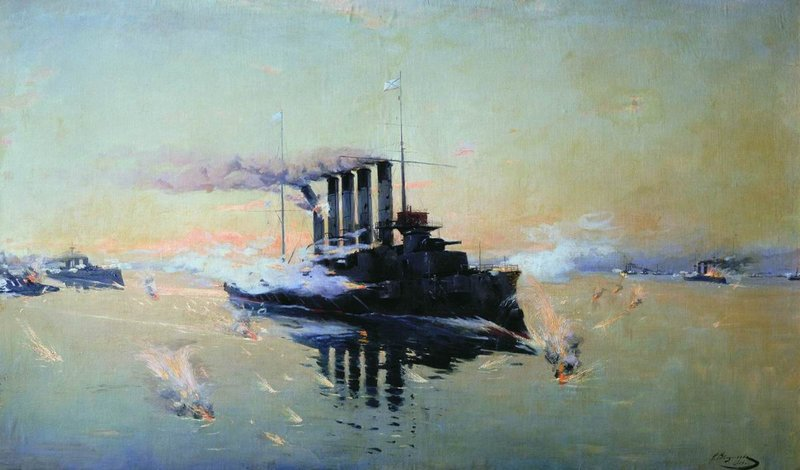
Constantin Alexandrovich Westchiloff, Breakthrough of the Cruiser Askold in 1904 in the Yellow Sea, 1906, Central Naval Museum, St. Petersburg

At the Academy's 1906 Fall Exhibition in St. Petersburg, Westchiloff showed Breakthrough of the Cruiser Askold in 1904 in the Yellow Sea, as well as portraits of Count Nikolay Muravyov-Amursky and Lieutenant S. Pogulyayev.

In 1907, he painted Marius on the Ruins of Carthage, which received mixed critical notice:

"Veshchilov promised the ruins, but did not give them, or he gave them too timidly and carefully. Instead of titanic chaos, there is something supremely decent... The best thing in the picture is the marina. In fact, Veshchilov is a good landscape painter, and, really, his small piece 'Warm Night' displayed next to it is much more successful and better than Marius with Carthaginian ruins..."

— N. Breshko-Breshkovsky in Birzhevyye Vedomosti, 21 March 1907

Westchiloff graduated from the Saint Petersburg Archaeological Institute in 1908. He gained wider acclaim for a series of historical canvases purchased by M. E. Sinitsyn, a collector from the Rezhitsa Old Believer community:

- On the Volga in Olden Times: Stenka Razin before the Campaign against Astrakhan in 1669, which won the first prize named after Princess Eugenia Maximilianovna of Leuchtenberg at the Imperial Society for the Encouragement of the Arts competition.
- The Trial of Archpriest Avvakum in the Golden Patriarchal Chamber, May 13, 1666, praised in the Moscow press as an outstanding masterwork of the modern "Russian style".

In 1910, Westchiloff designed stage sets for Aleksey Suvorin's play Tsar Dmitry the Pretender and Princess Ksenia at the Theater of the Literary and Art Society in St. Petersburg.

In 1911, he was appointed chief artist of the Naval Ministry with the civil rank of collegiate secretary, filling a post vacant since the death of Alexey Bogolyubov in 1896. In this capacity, he produced large battle scenes of the Russo-Japanese War, including Squadron of Admiral Rozhdestvensky, Anchorage of Military Ships in Port Arthur, and The Beginning of the End (awarded First Prize for Historical Painting by the Society for the Encouragement of Arts). His painting An Unexpected Arrival was acquired by Grand Duchess Maria Pavlovna of Russia, and Dowager Empress Maria Feodorovna purchased Brittany: High Tide and View of the Tuileries.

In 1912, Westchiloff traveled through Egypt and Palestine to paint studies for Caesar and Cleopatra. For his state and artistic service, he was awarded the Order of St. Anna, 2nd class in 1913, and the Order of St. Vladimir, 4th class in 1916. In 1914, he spent six months on Capri after the outbreak of World War I, creating a series of Italian landscapes that were later shown at the 1915 Spring Exhibition in Petrograd.

Following the Russian Revolution of 1917, Westchiloff designed propaganda (agitprop) theatrical sets at the Petrograd Technical Institute. Around 1918–1920, he stayed in Kochelaevo in Penza Governorate with painter Fedot Sychkov and married Maria Mikhailovna Erofeyeva. In 1919, he contributed works to the First Free State Exhibition in Petrograd.

=== Emigration ===
Westchiloff emigrated from Soviet Russia with his wife in 1922, living in Italy until 1928 and in France from 1929 to 1936. He first traveled to New York in September 1935 aboard the SS Île de France, and made subsequent transatlantic trips with his wife aboard the SS Normandie in 1936 and the Île de France in 1937 and 1938.

=== France ===
In Paris, Westchiloff maintained a studio overlooking the Seine River. In spring 1928, he held a solo exhibition at the Galeries Jean Charpentier (76 Rue du Faubourg-Saint-Honoré):

"M. Westchiloff's exhibition in a room on the first floor has had a great success from the first day and one of his works has been bought by the Duchess de Vendôme. (Note: Princess Henriette of Belgium was the Duchess of Vendôme from 12 February 1896 until 1 February 1931.) Under the late Tsar, M. Westchiloff was the painter of the Russian Navy, but his country is the subject of only a small number of his works. He has a brilliantly colored palette and has obtained extremely seductive effects in his Amalfi and Capri landscapes."

— Georges Bal

Between 1928 and 1930, Westchiloff worked in Paris as set designer and director for D. N. Kirova's Russian Intimate Theater. From 1933 until leaving France, he served on the board of the Artists Section of the Union of Russian Art Workers in France, participating in émigré exhibitions in Belgrade (1930) and Paris (1931, 1932).

=== United States ===
By October 1939, Westchiloff and his wife had settled in New York City, residing at 58 West 57th Street in Manhattan. In New York, he joined the Repin Society of Russian Artists and became an honorary member of the Society of Former Russian Naval Officers in America. He regularly donated paintings to charity auctions benefiting Russian émigré mutual-aid organizations. In 1937, his work was displayed at the Metropolitan Museum of Art.

In the late 1930s and early 1940s, Westchiloff painted coastal scenes in New England, frequently working around Ogunquit, Maine, as well as winter landscapes in the Adirondack Mountains.

In January 1936, the Reynolds Gallery in New York opened an exhibition of his works. Art critic Howard DeVree reviewed the show in The New York Times:

"Westchiloff's canvases are fairly typical of the Russian school of artists in the pre-war period. (Note: Pre-World War I.) Here are the historical illustrative quality, the high palette, the Ivan Fedorovich Choultsé-like light on snow, the emphasis on the picturesque. One or two — notably a bridge reflected in the water — may be recognized as revealing French influence. Technically, there is abundance of craftsmanship."

— Howard DeVree

In April 1942, the gallery (renamed Reynolds-Metropolitan) relocated to 50 Rockefeller Plaza, inaugurating its new premises with an exhibition of Westchiloff's paintings. In May 1939, he participated in a group exhibition at the Municipal Art Galleries.

Westchiloff died of a heart attack in New York City on 23 April 1945. He was buried on 25 April 1945 at Mount Olivet Cemetery in Maspeth, Queens.

In February 1959, collector Robert Lehman acquired 28 paintings and etchings by Westchiloff from Lock Galleries in New York. Lehman subsequently donated five paintings and one etching to the Metropolitan Museum of Art.

== Reception ==
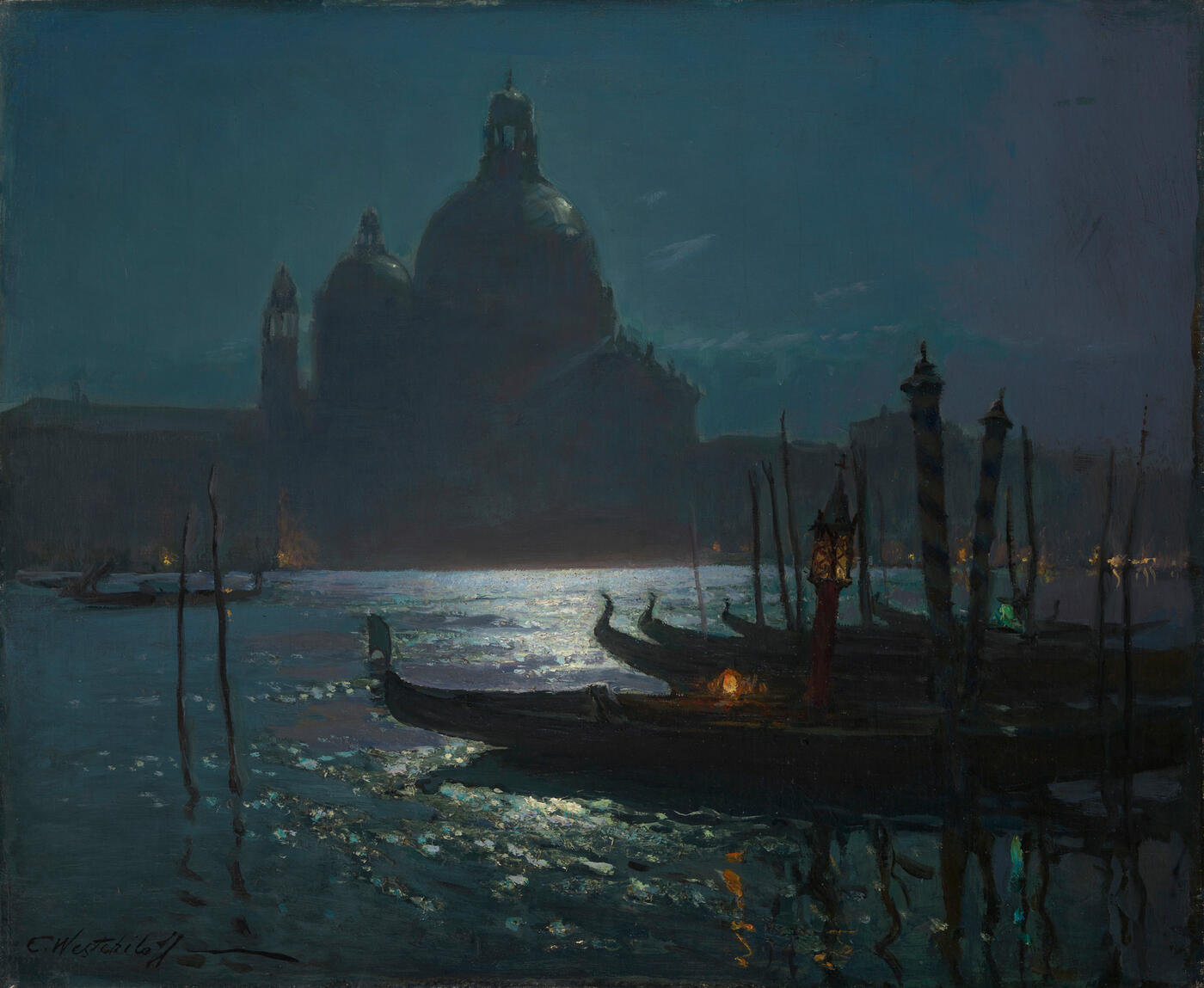
Santa Maria della Salute at Night

A catalogue of the Robert Lehman Collection at the Metropolitan Museum notes that Westchiloff's Russian-period paintings remained grounded in academic realism rather than the experimental idioms of the Russian avant-garde, such as Suprematism or Constructivism. Later critics characterized his style in Western Europe and the United States as closest to Impressionism.

Curator Anthony Capodilupo observed that Westchiloff's favored medium was oil, "which was well suited to his confident and strong technique," imbuing his landscapes and coastal scenes with the dramatic atmosphere of New England. Art historian Natalie H. Lee noted that Westchiloff's seascapes reveal his "evident skill at rendering water and the atmosphere of the New England coast and undoubtedly derive from the tradition of seascape painting that was an important part of Russian academic training in the nineteenth century, when the artist was a student." Biographer Peter H. Falk summarized Westchiloff as "an enigmatic character".
