= Aleksandr Malyshkin =

Russian Soviet writer

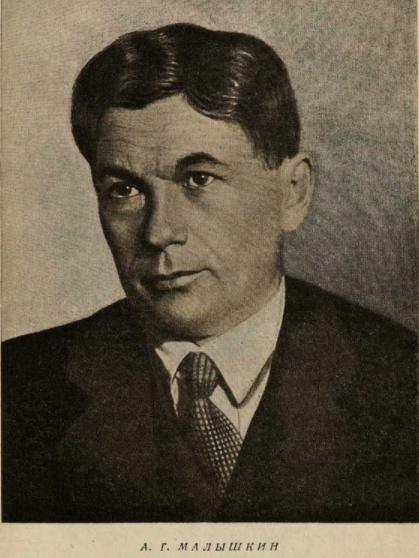
- Born: March 21, 1892; Bogorodskoye village, Mokshansky Uyezd, Penza Governorate, Russian Empire
- Died: August 3, 1938 (aged 46); Moscow, Russian SFSR, Soviet Union
- Writing career
- Notable works: Fall of the Dair; People From the Backwoods
- Literary movement: Socialist realism

Aleksandr Georgievich Malyshkin (Russian: Алекса́ндр Гео́ргиевич Малы́шкин; 21 March 1892 – 3 August 1938) was a Russian Soviet writer.

== Biography ==
Malyshkin was born in to a large family of Russian peasants in Penza. His father worked as a clerk.

In 1916, Malyshkin graduated from the Faculty of Philology of Petrograd University. Already while studying at the university, he wrote realistic stories about county life which were published in the magazines such as Mir Bozhiy and Nasha Zarya.

After graduating from the university, Malyshkin was drafted into the army, promoted to ensign ahead of schedule and sent to Sevastopol, to the active Black Sea Fleet. From 1918 to 1920 he participated on side of the Red Army in the Civil War on the Eastern Front, Turkestan and Southern fronts; took part in operations to capture Crimea. In 1925, after serving in the Red Army, he headed the naval department of the Krasnaya Zvezda newspaper.

Malyshkin became famous for his story “The Fall of Dair,” written in 1923, one of the first attempts in Soviet literature to demonstrate the popular character of the revolution and depict the heroism of the Red Army.

He was a member of the literary organization Pereval in the 1920s. He became a member of the board of the Union of Soviet Writers after its foundation and a member of the editorial board of the Novy Mir magazine.

His novel People from the Outback, unfinished due to his early death, brought wide reader recognition, which was the pinnacle of the writer's work. The novel carefully develops the theme of re-education of people in the process of post-revolutionary transformations.

The writer came to Penza at the end of January 1938 to collect materials “about the new industrial Penza”; he was going to write a play for the Penza theater, but on August 3, a message came about his unexpected death.

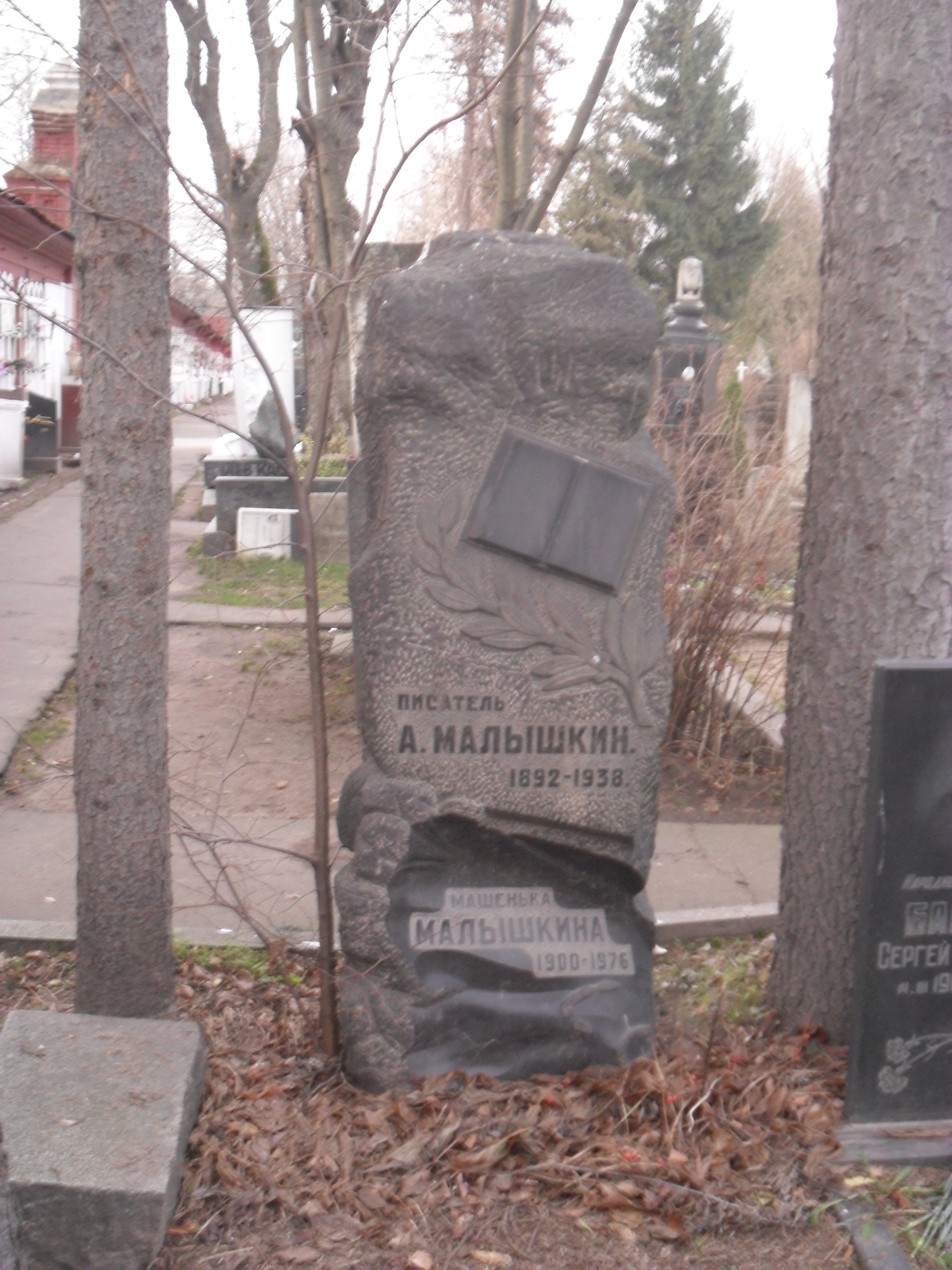
Grave of Aleksandr Malyshkin at the Novodevichy Cemetery

In 1950, his collection “Stories, Essays, Film Scripts” was published in Penza.
