= Fedot Sychkov =

Russian painter (1870–1958)

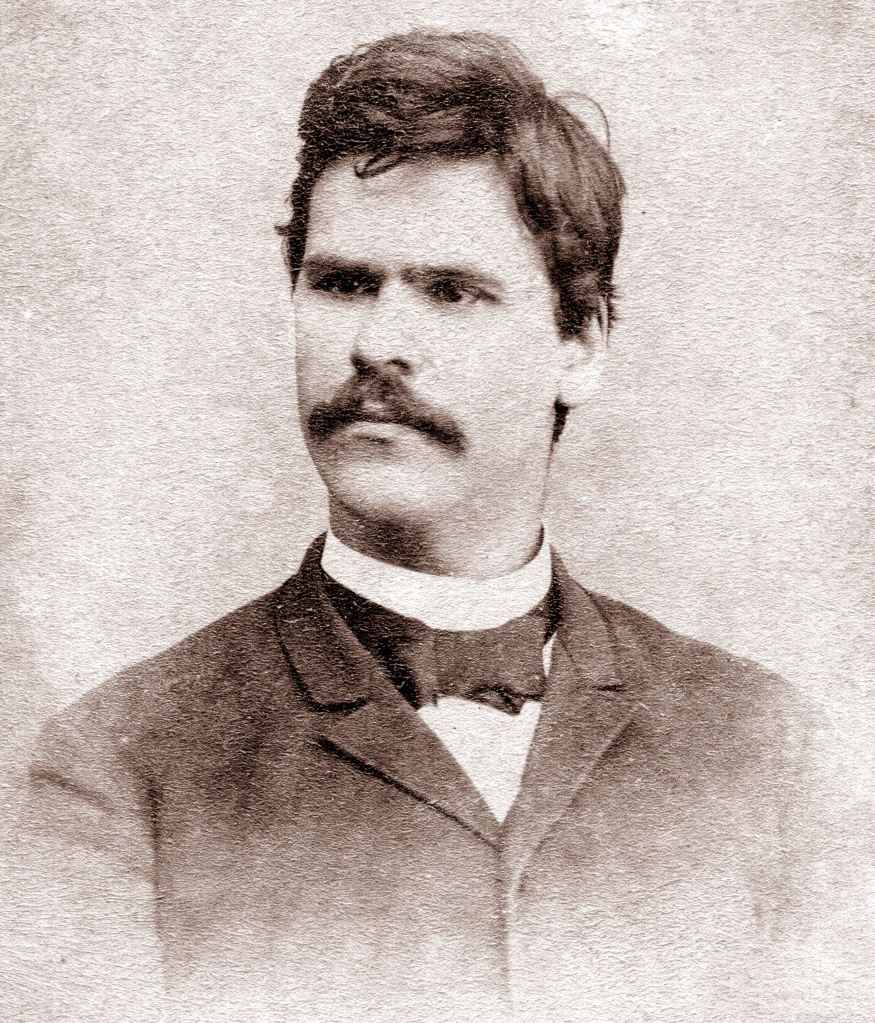
F.V. Sychkov

Fedot Vasilevich Sychkov (Russian: Федот Васильевич Сычков), March 13, 1870, Kochelaevo, Russian Empire – August 3, 1958, Saransk) was a Russian painter.

== The early years (1870–1900) ==
Fedot Vasilyevich Sychkov was born in Penza Governorate, in the village Kochelaevo of Narovchatsky Uyezd, now Kovylkinsky District of Mordovia in 1870. His family was poor, he lost his parents as a child. Fedot Sychkov began his education in the three-class school. A few years after its completion and cooperative learning in the icon workshop Sychkov began working as an artist, he painted icons and portraits of peasants. One of the famous works of this period is the picture "Founding of Arapovo Station" (1892), made for Ivan Arapov, general from St. Petersburg who lived on his estate near Kochelaevo. With his help, young artist Sychkov was sent to St. Petersburg to continue his artistic education in 1892.

In the Drawing School of St. Petersburg he continued to improve his skills and create paintings. One of the best paintings of the period is "Portrait of the Artist's Younger Sister, Yekaterina Sychkova" (1893). Also Sychkov painted custom portraits.

In 1895 he began studying at the Higher School of Arts at the Imperial Academy of Arts. In the years of study Sychkov painted several self-portraits.

Like many young other of that time, he wanted to study in Ilya Repin’s workshop, who he was Familiar to.

Despite the fact that during these years course of Imperial Academy of Arts Sychkov studied the battle-painting after graduation he found his vocation as a portrait and genre painter.

After completing his studies in St. Petersburg Sychkov returned to his homeland. The main topics of his works concerned folk festivals, weddings and other celebrations. He also was very interested in painting everyday village life. For example "On The Hills" (1910), "Skating Carnival" (1914).

== The youth of the artist (1900–1930) ==
In the years 1900–1910, Sychkov was the period of artistic maturity. In that time he painted "Return of the Fair," "Village Wedding," "Blessing of the Waters", "Christ Singers", "Difficult Transition", "Flax Combers", "Return From The Hay" and several others. Sychkov tried to tell various aspects of rural life without embell shing of the life. His works attracted by the brightness of the portrait characteristics, accurately build the plastic multi-track to the ability, find expressive poses and gestures that give special emotional openness of the images.

In the 1900s. developed front portraits at the time Sychkov was a very popular portrait painter in St. Petersburg. Customers are attracted by his ability to paint quickly and accurately grasping the features of appearance. Among his "models" were bankers, government officials and society ladies. An excellent example of the front of the portrait is "Portrait In Black" (1904).

Children's portraits became interesting page in work of the painter. For the first time he consulted them in the 900th years, except for a few students' studies where it was posed as a model by children. Among them are "Friends" (1911), "Girlfriends. Children" (1916), "Grinko" (1937). The trip abroad in 1908 became one of his brightest vital impressions.Acquaintance to masterpieces of the West European art became a powerful impulse for further creative activity of the painter, lifted it on qualitatively new artistic level. He brought from Italy and France a lot of scenery.Grandiose buildings of ancient Rome – Arch of Constantine, Forum, Colosseum appear in them as symbols of former greatness of the antique empire.

The color range constructed on combinations of light yellow-green and blue tones, transfers a hot haze of the southern air in which as if outlines of monuments of an antiquity melt.However at doubtless art advantages of these landscapes, the artist's soul most completely reveals in the works devoted to native places. Tirelessly he painted the native village, crooked fences, ingrown into the land of the hut, the spring floods overflowing Moksha. Intimacy and warmth of sentiment infused with small-sized winter studies are designed in a gray-bluish color. At the heart of landscapes – deep poetic feeling, a worship of the master for beauty of the Russian nature exciting in the modest charm.

Sychkov's creative range was rather wide. Besides, portraits, landscapes, genre cloths, throughout all life he painted still lifes: from classically clear on manner of performance, as, for example, «The Still life. Fruit», created in 1908 during a trip across Italy, more characteristic for it still lifes with a landscape approach - "Strawberry" (1910), "Cucumbers" (1917), etc. in which in a bit different refraction the same subject of life and a village life sounds. Sychkov liked to work in a garden, in a kitchen.He always was proud to say, "I am a peasant!"

The end of the 1910-1920th – it was time when Sychkov created, generally options or repetitions of the early works, continuing to develop favourite and characteristic for it a subject of holidays, varying plots of pre-revolutionary pictures - "Girlfriends" (1920), "Holiday" (1927), «The holiday. Girlfriends. Winter» (1929) and several others. His style of painting evolved during this time toward greater brightness of a color.

== Maturity (1930–1958) ==
In 1930 the new authorities were trying to dispossess him, counted among individual peasants. It was a difficult time in Sychkov's life. Sychkov continued to participate actively at this time in exhibition life of Moscow and Leningrad, but in Mordovia, very few people knew about it. In 1937 in Mordovia the Union of artists was created. Sychkov's pictures made the real furor. In the 1930s, when the Mordovian autonomy was formed, the special place in creativity of the painter was occupied by a national subject. However, the appeal to this subject cannot be considered as a courtesy towards the authorities as Mordovian ethno - the culture caused long ago interest in the master to what numerous photos from Sychkov's archive testify.

Unlike Russian peasants, Mordvinians continued to wear national clothes and during the Soviet period. Dozens of sketches, the etudes of the Mordovian national suit preceding creation of such known pictures as "Teacher-Mordvinian" (1937), "Tractor Driver, Mordvinian" (1938). In the second half of the '30s, theme of art Sychkov expanded by reference to the Soviet reality. This time he created paintings "Day Off The Farm" (1936), "The Collective Farm Market" (1936), they stand out with their multi-figure compositions, artist's ability to distinguish among the mass of the individual characters of people. These works on their ideological orientation were quite in line with Stalin epoch's official art.

Some traces of the influence of social realism can be found in the custom panel "Harvest Festival" (1938) and "Presentation Of The Eternal Act Of Free Use Of The Land" (1938), pompously praising a hard working Soviet man. These two large format canvas were created by the author in the shortest possible time for exhibition hall "Volga" for the State Agricultural Exhibition in Moscow.

Among the works of 1940–50s, created by the artist in the eighth decade of his life, stand out "Return From School" (1945) and "Meeting With A Hero" (1952). It is known that he had serious problems with eyes, but he continued to work.

The last two years of life the artist spent in Saransk, continuing the work until the last days.

== Features of the style of Fedot Sychkov ==
Fedot Sychkov is best known for his compositions containing only one or two figures. Despite the similarity of type of depicted people paintings look in different ways. Basically, there is a pure portrait, where the model is shown in a neutral background. But it gets more developed with time. Centre to all the paintings is a human coexistence with the natural world. In his portraits, landscape always combines with emotional state of characters or contrasts with it. There are not so many compositional innovations in arts of Sychkov. There are some plots going through all the work of the master, for example – “near the fence”, “driving down the hills”. However, it cannot be reproached for the monotony and the cliche. Sychkov did never aim to the painting of people with complex, contradictory character.

The phenomenon of Sychkov as a painter is a loyalty to one theme – the theme life of a Russian village, passed through the prism of his artistic vision of peasant life and traditions. Contemporary to Fedot Sychkov peasants abandoned the traditional clothing in everyday life, but he portrayed his models in the traditional Russian sundresses, bright scarves, beads.

The best known works by Sychkov:

- "Portrait of Anna Ivanovna Sychkov, the Mother of the Artist" (1898)
- "News from the War" (1900)
- "Portrait of a Woman"(1903)
- "Portrait in Black" (1904)
- "Flax Combers" (1905)
- "Girlfriends" (1909)
- "From the Hills" (1910)
- "Return From The Hay" (1911)
- "Skating Carnival" (1914)
- "The Return Of The Fair"
- "Country Wedding"
- "Blessing Of The Waters"
- "Christ Singers"
- "The Difficult Transition"
- "Holiday" (1927)
- "Holiday. Girlfriend. Winter "(1929)
- "The Day on The Farm" (1936)
- "The Collective Farm Market" (1936)
- "The Teacher-Mordvinian" (1937)
- 'Tractor Driver, Mordvinian "(1938)
- "Harvest Festival" (1938)
- "Presentation of the Eternal Act of Free Use of the Land" (1938)
- "Return From School" (1945)
- "Meeting with a Hero" (1952).
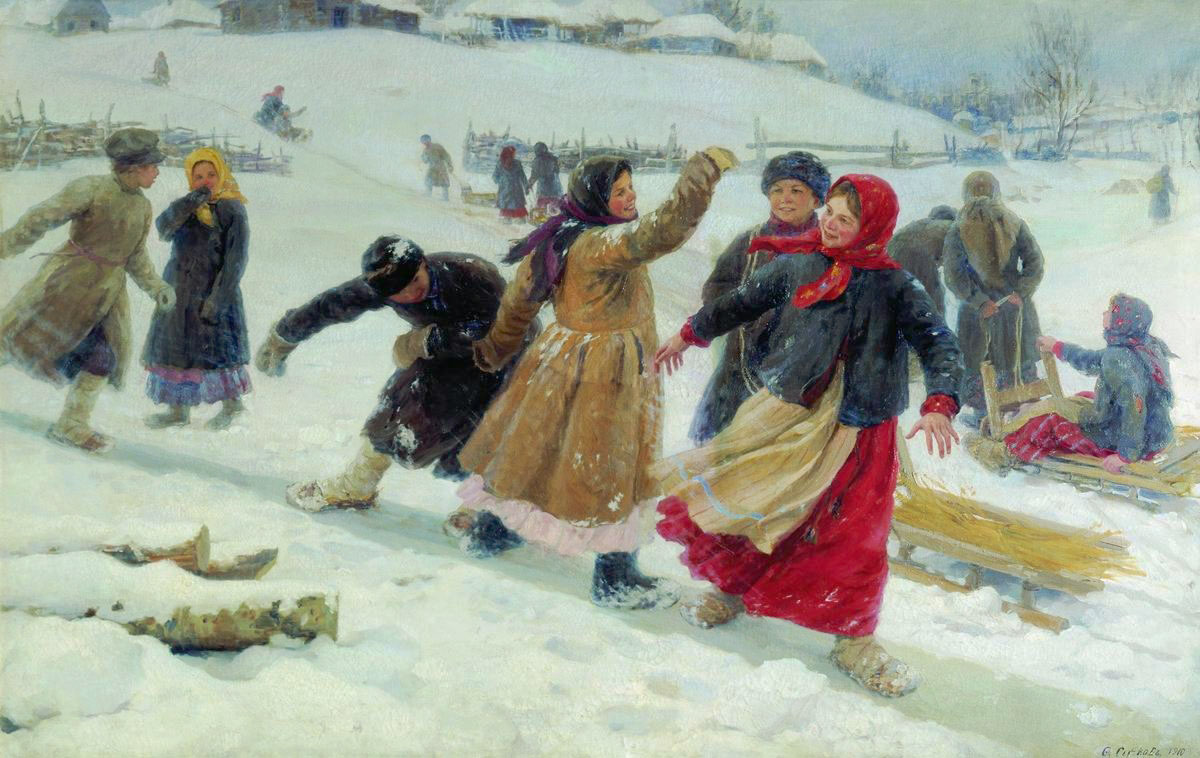
From the Hills

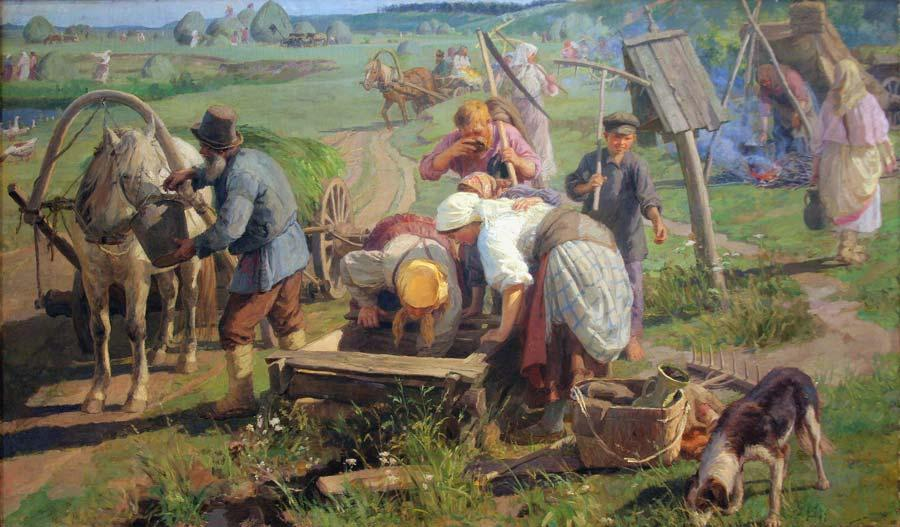
Return From The Hay

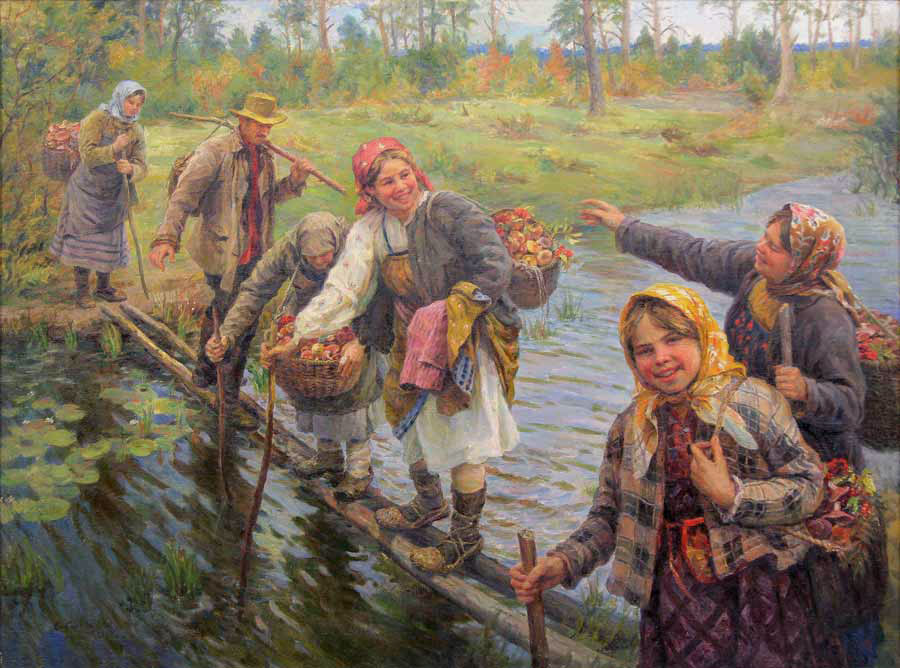
The Difficult Transition

Since 1960, at the Mordovian Erzia Museum of Visual Arts there is a permanent exhibition of his works (in the collections of the museum there is the largest collection of paintings and graphic works by Sychkov; there is about 600 works, including sketches and drawings).

In 1970, the 100th anniversary of the birth of the eminent painter was published by order of the Ministry of Culture of Mordovia on opening the artist's memorial museum. House and Museum of Fedot Sychkov was opened March 11, 1970 at Kochelaevo after a reconstruction of the premises.
