= Alexander Arkhangelsky (composer) =

Russian composer and conductor

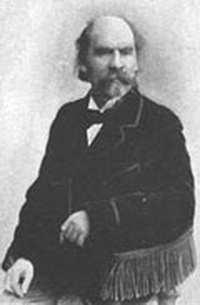
Alexander Arkhangelsky

Alexander Andreyevich Arkhangelsky (Russian: Алекса́ндр Андре́евич Арха́нгельский) (23 October [O.S. 11 October] 1846, in Staroye Tezikovo, Penza Governorate – 16 November 1924, in Prague) was a Russian composer of church music and a conductor.

He "received his initial musical education at the Penza Theological Seminary; from childhood sang in the choir of the Archbishop of Penza; later taught singing in the Penza Seminary; in 1872 passed the examination at the Imperial Court Chapel for the title of precentor. From 1873 served as conductor of a number of church choirs in St. Petersburg, among them the choir of Count Sheremetev (1889-1898). In 1880 organized his own choir in St. Petersburg, replacing boys' voices with women's; from 1883 toured with this choir in Russia and abroad, performing Russian and Western sacred music, secular choruses and arrangements of folk songs. In 1902 organized the Church Singers' Benefit Society in St. Petersburg; taught choral singing in various educational institutions, and published choral anthologies.

Arkhangelsky made an important contribution to Russian choral and church singing: beginning with simple arrangements of church chants, which included the complete cycle of hymns for the entire year, he later enriched the so-called "St. Petersburg style" of church music with more complex free compositions, many of which are modeled after traditional Western European polyphony. Among his works are over 300 sacred compositions and arrangements of church chants, many of which are published in the form of complete liturgical cycles, (Divine Liturgy, the All-Night Vigil, the Memorial Service, etc.). Arkhangelsky also composed a number of secular choruses a cappella and arrangements of Russian folk songs."

To the Mother of God Let Us Earnestly Hasten, by Alexander Arkhangelsky
Audio by Daniel Johnson
