= Alexander Arkhangelsky =

Alexander Arkhangelsky may refer to:

- Aleksandr Arkhangelsky (1892–1978), aircraft designer and doctor of technical sciences
- Alexander Arkhangelsky (composer) (1846–1924), Russian composer of church music and conductor
- Alexander Arhangelskii (born 1938), Russian mathematician
