= Chembarsky Uyezd =

Subdivisions of the Penza Governorate of the Russian Empire

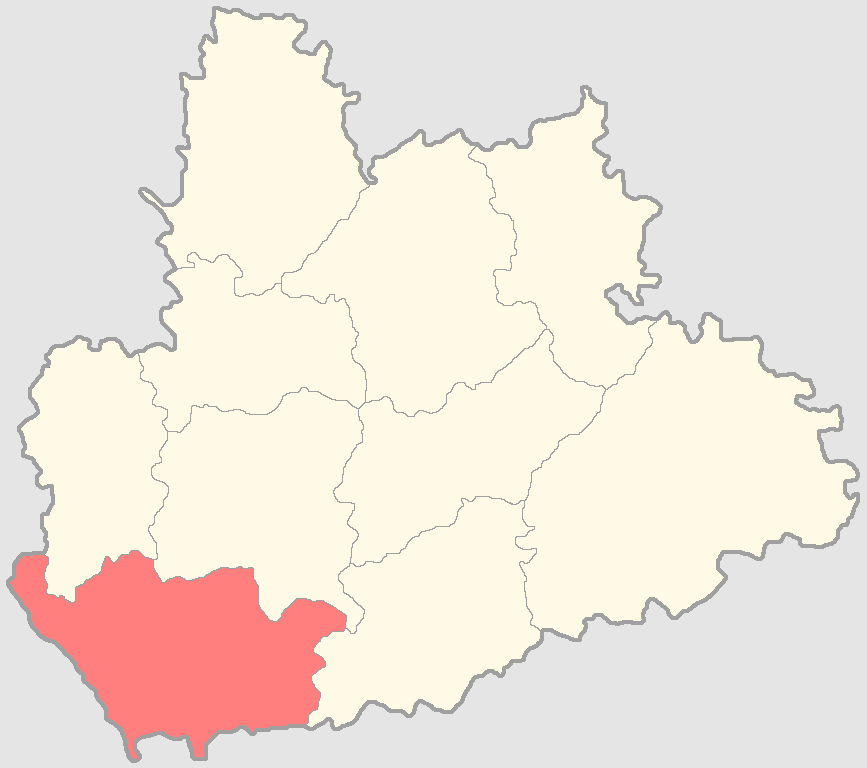

Chembarsky Uyezd (Чембарский уезд) was one of the subdivisions of the Penza Governorate of the Russian Empire. It was situated in the southwestern part of the governorate. Its administrative centre was Chembar (Belinsky). In terms of present-day administrative borders, the territory of Chembarsky Uyezd is divided between the Bashmakovsky, Belinsky, Kamensky, Pachelmsky and Tamalinsky districts of Penza Oblast.

== Demographics ==
At the time of the Russian Empire Census of 1897, Chembarsky Uyezd had a population of 153,380. Of these, 86.1% spoke Russian, 7.8% Mordvin, 5.8% Tatar and 0.2% Ukrainian as their native language.
