= Nizhnelomovsky Uyezd =

Subdivision of Penza Governorate

Nizhnelomovsky Uyezd (Нижнеломовский уезд) was one of the subdivisions of the Penza Governorate of the Russian Empire. It was situated in the central part of the governorate. Its administrative centre was Nizhny Lomov. In terms of present-day administrative borders, the territory of Nizhnelomovsky Uyezd is divided between the Kamensky, Mokshansky, Nizhnelomovsky and Pachelmsky districts of Penza Oblast.

== Demographics ==
At the time of the Russian Empire Census of 1897, Nizhnelomovsky Uyezd had a population of 153,395. Of these, 96.9% spoke Russian, 2.3% Mordvin and 0.7% Tatar as their native language.
