= Insarsky Uyezd =

Insarsky Uyezd (Инсарский уезд) was one of the subdivisions of the Penza Governorate of the Russian Empire. It was situated in the northern part of the governorate. Its administrative centre was Insar. In terms of present-day administrative borders, the territory of Insarsky Uyezd is divided between the Insarsky, Kadoshkinsky, Kovylkinsky, Lyambirsky, Ruzayevsky and Staroshaygovsky districts of Mordovia and Issinsky District of Penza Oblast.

== Demographics ==
At the time of the Russian Empire Census of 1897, Insarsky Uyezd had a population of 178,233. Of these, 69.3% spoke Russian, 23.6% Mordvin and 7.3% Tatar as their native language.
