= Nikolay Burdenko =

Russian Empire and Soviet surgeon

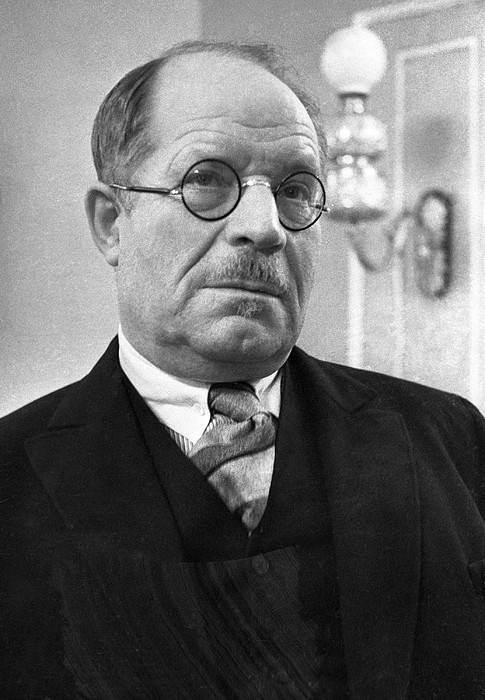
- Burdenko in 1937
- Born: 3 June 1876; Kamenka village, Penza Governorate, Russian Empire
- Died: 11 November 1946 (aged 70); Moscow, Soviet Union
- Education: Imperial University of Yuryev
- Known for: Neurosurgery, field surgery
- Scientific career
- Fields: Medicine, surgery, neurosurgery
- Workplaces: Red Cross; Imperial University of Yuryev; Moscow University; Central Neurosurgical Institute; USSR Academy of Medical Sciences

Nikolay Nilovich Burdenko (Russian: Николай Нилович Бурденко; 22 May [O.S. 10 May] 1876 – 11 November 1946) was a Russian and Soviet surgeon, the founder of Russian neurosurgery. He was Surgeon-General of the Red Army (1937–1946), an academician of the USSR Academy of Sciences (from 1939), an academician and the first director of the Academy of Medical Sciences of the USSR (1944–1946), a Hero of Socialist Labor (from 1943), Colonel General of medical services, and a Stalin Prize winner (1941). He was a veteran of the Russo-Japanese War, First World War, Winter War and the German-Soviet War.

== Early years ==
Nikolay Burdenko was born on 3 June 1876 in the village of Kamenka in the Nizhnelomovsky Uyezd of the Penza Governorate (modern-day Kamenka, Kamensky District, Penza Oblast of Russia), one of the eight children of Nil Karpovich Burdenko and Varvara Markianovna Burdenko (née Smagina). His paternal grandfather Karp Fyodorovich Burdenko came from serfs of the Kuznetsky Uezd of the Saratov Governorate where he served as a landlord's estate manager and his wife as a maid; after being granted freedom they moved to Penza and then to Verhniy Lomov of the Penza Governorate. Nikolay's father also worked as an estate manager for the major general Vladimir Voeykov (ru) who served in the Svita of Nicholas II and was close to the Emperor's family. Nikolay's mother was a housewife who came from peasants of the Tambov Governorate.

In 1885, Burdenko finished Kamenka zemstvo school and in 1886 entered Penza theological school to study for an Orthodox priest. In 1891, he entered Penza theological seminary and was soon sent to the Saint Petersburg Theological Academy as the best student. In 1897, he left it to study medicine at the recently opened Faculty of Medicine of the Tomsk Imperial University. There, he became fascinated with anatomy and operative surgery, and by the third course he was appointed as a prosector's assistant. He was then excluded from the university for participating in the 1899 Russian student strike, but was pardoned and restored just to be excluded for the second time in 1901 on the same account. After that, he was forced to leave Tomsk.

== Medical career ==
On 11 October 1901, he entered the fourth course of the Imperial University of Yuryev (modern-day University of Tartu), Faculty of Medicine. Once again, he became involved with the student protest movement and had to spend a year in the Kherson Governorate treating children with typhus, tuberculosis and other epidemic diseases. He was then restored in the university. During that time he worked a lot as a surgeon and took part in medical expeditions around the country to fight epidemics of typhus, smallpox and scarlet fever.

In January 1904, Burdenko volunteered for the Russo-Japanese War. He served in the field ambulance detachment in Manchuria and was shot in the arm while saving wounded under hostile fire during the Battle of Te-li-Ssu. He was awarded with the Cross of St. George for his service. On December he demobilized and returned to his studies. In 1905, he was invited to the surgery department of the Riga town hospital for practice.

In 1906, Burdenko graduated from the university and moved back to Penza where he became a surgeon at the local zemstvo hospital. Simultaneously he worked on a thesis on the consequences of portal vein ligation. He was heavily influenced by the works of Ivan Pavlov that inspired him to write five scientific efforts. In March 1909, he earned the Doctor of Medicine degree and the next year he became a privatdozent and an associate professor at the University of Yuryev.

== World War I ==
With the start of the World War I in 1914, Burdenko once again volunteered for the frontline and joined the Red Cross detachment of the Northwestern Front, taking part in the East Prussian Operation and the Battle of the Vistula River. In addition to the duties of field surgeon he also evacuated wounded soldiers under hostile fire, organized triage, aid and dressing stations, including special sections for soldiers with stomach, lungs and skull wounds. For the first time in battlefield medicine Burdenko applied first aid care for skull injuries. From 1915 to 1917, he also worked as a consultant surgeon, first at the Kovno and Vilna Governorates, then at the 2nd Army and various Riga hospitals. In March 1917, he was appointed the Main Battlefield Medical Inspector, but left the post on May due to disagreements with the Russian Provisional Government and returned to front.

He was diagnosed with the post-concussion syndrome after one of the battles and had to return to his Alma mater where he headed the surgery department. Following the occupation of Yuryev by German forces Burdenko was suggested to continue to carry out his duties under the new power, but he declined the offer and in June 1918 evacuated to Voronezh along with other professors. There, he became one of the founders of the Voronezh State University based on the University of Yuryev.

== Scientific work ==
Burdenko took active part in building and managing war hospitals for the Red Army. In 1920 he organized medical courses to prepare field surgeons and nurses. Simultaneously he consulted the Voronezh Health Department and continued his scientific work. His researches concerned shock prevention, healing of wounds and infections, surgical treatment of tuberculosis, anesthesia, blood transfusion and so on. At the time he also came to conclusion that neurosurgery must be taken as a separate specialty.

In 1923, Burdenko moved to Moscow and became a professor of the Moscow State University where he founded a neurosurgical department; in 1930, it was reorganized into the 1st Moscow Medical Institute. He also headed the university surgical clinic from 1924 until his death which currently bears his name. In 1929, a faculty of field surgery was founded on his initiative. Same year Burdenko was appointed a director of the neurosurgical clinic of the X-ray institute under the People's Commissariat for Health which served as the basis for the world's first Central Neurosurgical Institute founded in 1932 (known today as N .N. Burdenko National Scientific and Practical Center for Neurosurgery).

Burdenko was among the first to introduce surgery of the central and peripheral nervous system to clinical practice; he investigated the reasons behind the appearance of shock and the methods of treating it, made a large contribution to the study of the processes which appear in the central and peripheral nervous system in connection with the surgical operation in the case of sharp injuries; he developed the bulbotomy — operation on the upper division of the spinal cord. Burdenko created the school of surgeons with a sharply pronounced experimental direction. Works in the domains of the oncology of central and vegetative nervous system, pathology of the liquor circulation, and cerebral blood circulation were the valuable contribution of Burdenko and his school to the theory and practice of neurosurgery.

With his active participation, neurosurgical clinics and departments appeared all over the country. Burdenko organized and headed various medical conferences, including the All-Union Neurosurgical Council founded in 1935, and represented Soviet Union at international conferences. He also headed the All-Union Association of Surgeons and became a member of the USSR Academy of Sciences in 1938, the same year he joined the Communist Party of the Soviet Union. From 1937, he worked as the main consultant surgeon under the Red Army Board of Health. He also published the first guide concerning field surgery based on his war experience which helped to prepare the army for the World War II.

== World War II ==
In 1939, the 64-year-old Burdenko joined the Winter War and spent all four months at the frontline, managing the battlefield surgery. With the start of the Great Patriotic War in 1941, he was appointed the Main Surgeon of the Red Army and participated in some of the first battles that took place near Yartsevo and Vyazma. He organized medical help and personally operated thousands of people. He also tested and actively applied first antibiotics—benzylpenicillin and gramicidin—to treat injury infections.

During one of the Nazi bombings, Burdenko survived another heavy concussion which led to a stroke; he also completely lost ability to talk and had to train hard to regain it. He spent two months in war hospitals and in April 1942 returned to Moscow where he continued scientific work. For the first time in world medicine he suggested to treat pus complications after brain and skull injures by injecting streptocide white into a carotid artery which turned to be more effective compared to intravenous injections practiced at the time. He also promoted the usage of secondary suture and effective treating of artery wounds.

In November 1942, Burdenko was appointed a member of the Extraordinary State Commission. He investigated various Nazi crimes, including attacks on medical personnel, hospital trains and Red Cross units. He also headed the special commission of forensic medical examination that revealed atrocities committed during the Nazi occupation of the Smolensk and Oryol Oblast where over 215 000 Soviet civilians were murdered.

In January 1944, he headed a special commission established to investigate the Katyn massacre. The commission's report assigned Nazi Germany the responsibility for the massacre, factually carried out by the NKVD (People's Commissariat for Internal Affairs), the Soviet secret police. Based on the autopsy performed by 75 doctors, evidences found on corpses and testimony collected from witnesses, the commission reported that the massacre happened during the autumn of 1941 and that methods used to kill Polish officers were identical to those used by German forces during occupation of Soviet cities. Documented materials were entered into evidence at the Nuremberg trial. In 1993, a commission of experts under the Russia's Chief Military Prosecutor's Office disapproved the Burdenko commission's report as "false" and "not meeting science requirements".

In 1950, Boris Olshansky, a defector to the United States and a former Soviet Army officer who claimed to be a former associated professor at the Voronezh State University and Burdenko's friend, published an article and in 1952 — testified in court that in April 1946 Burdenko had revealed to him that he knew about the execution been carried out by the NKVD, recognizing it as a "mistake" of the agency, and stating that for him as a medical man "it was quite clear" that the corpses dated back to 1940. In 1957, Olshansky returned to the USSR where he claimed that his testimony was made up by the American Committee for Liberation and was given by him under fear of repressions, although according to Democratic United States Representative Dan Flood, Olshansky "appeared and testified voluntarily". However, other doubts arose as to the credibility of Olshansky's testimony the following years.

Burdenko's name also appeared on the official Soviet report regarding the Auschwitz concentration camp as document USSR-008.

In June 1944, the USSR Academy of Medical Sciences was founded in Moscow. It was designed in accordance with plans developed by Burdenko and was partially based on the Institute of Experimental Medicine — the first Russian research institute that existed from 1890 to 1944. Burdenko served as its president from 20 December until his death.

== Death ==
In June 1945, he survived a second stroke, and during the summer of 1946 — a third one. While in hospital, Burdenko finished a report on healing of gunshot wounds.

Burdenko died on 11 November 1946, just several months after the third stroke. He was buried at the Novodevichy Cemetery in Moscow. He was survived by his wife Maria Emilievna Burdenko (1882–1954) and their son Vladimir Nikolaevich Burdenko (1912–1974), Captain 2nd rank who served on submarine during the war.

== Honours and awards ==
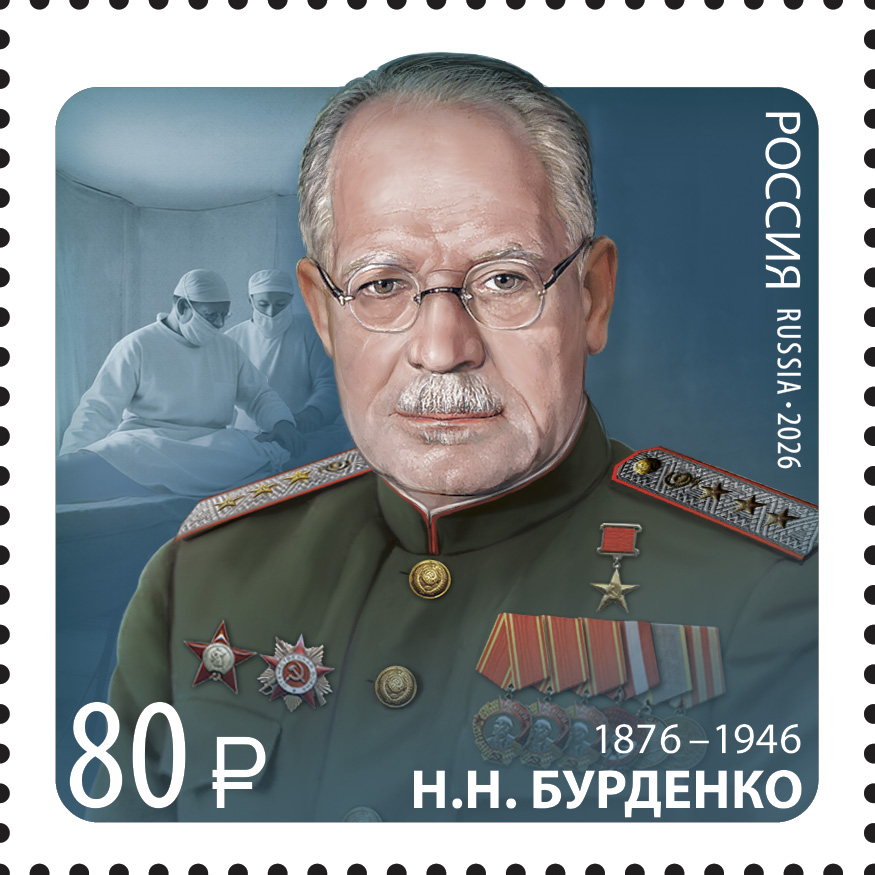
Burdenko on a 2026 Russian stamp

- Order of Saint Anna, 3rd class with swords (March 1915)
- Order of Saint Anna, 2nd class (April 1915)
- Order of Saint Vladimir, 4th class (1916)
- Hero of Socialist Labour (1943)
- Three Orders of Lenin
- Order of the Red Banner
- Order of the Patriotic War, 1st class
- Order of the Red Star
- Medal for Combat Service
- Medal "For the Defence of Moscow"
- Medal "For the Victory over Germany in the Great Patriotic War 1941–1945"
- Medal "For the Victory over Japan"
- Medal "For Valiant Labour in the Great Patriotic War 1941-1945"
- Stalin Prize (1941)
- Honorary member of the International Society of Surgeons, Royal Society of London.

The following were named after Burdenko: SRI of the neurosurgery in Moscow, Central military hospital, the faculty of the surgical clinic of Sechenov's medical academy, Penza provincial clinical hospital, streets in Moscow and Voronezh, an asteroid (6754 Burdenko).

== Literature ==
- Nikolay Burdenko (1951). N. N. Burdenko. Collection of Works in 7 Volumes. — Moscow: Academy of Science Publishing House.
- Suren Bagdasaryan (1950). Materials for N. N. Burdenko's Biography (1876–1946). — Moscow: Academy of Science Publishing House, 152 pages.
- Suren Bagdasaryan (1954). Nikolay Nilovich Burdenko. — Moscow: Medgiz, 248 pages.
