= Krasnoslobodsky Uyezd =

Krasnoslobodsky Uyezd (Краснослободский уезд) was one of the subdivisions of the Penza Governorate of the Russian Empire. It was situated in the northern part of the governorate. Its administrative centre was Krasnoslobodsk. In terms of present-day administrative borders, the territory of Krasnoslobodsky Uyezd is divided between the Atyuryevsky, Kovylkinsky, Krasnoslobodsky, Temnikovsky and Yelnikovsky districts of Mordovia.

== Demographics ==
At the time of the Russian Empire Census of 1897, Krasnoslobodsky Uyezd had a population of 174,396. Of these, 66.9% spoke Russian, 24.7% Mordvin, 8.2% Tatar and 0.2% Ukrainian as their native language.
