= Kamenka, Kamensky District, Penza Oblast =

Town in Penza Oblast, Russia

Kamenka Каменка
- Town
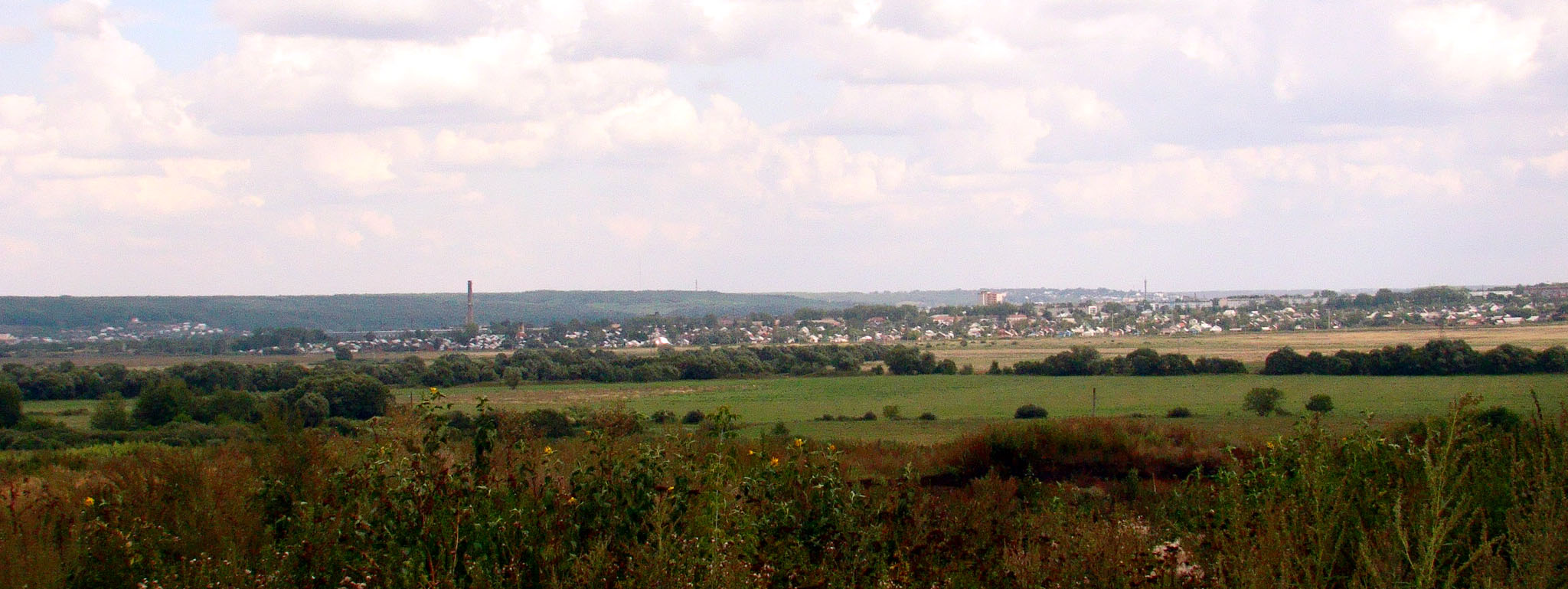
- View of Kamenka

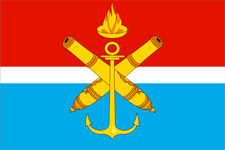
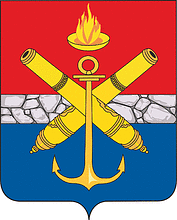
- Flag Coat of arms
- Interactive map of Kamenka
- Location of Kamenka Kamenka (Penza Oblast)
- Coordinates: 53°11′N 44°03′E
- Country: Russia
- Federal subject: Penza Oblast
- Administrative district: Kamensky District
- Town of district significanceSelsoviet: Kamenka
- Founded: 18th century
- Town status since: 1951
- Elevation: 180 m (590 ft)

Population (2010 Census)
  - Total: 39,577
  - Estimate (2025): 32,477 (−17.9%)

Administrative status
  - Capital of: Kamensky District, town of district significance of Kamenka

Municipal status
  - Municipal district: Kamensky Municipal District
  - Urban settlement: Kamenka Urban Settlement
  - Capital of: Kamensky Municipal District, Kamenka Urban Settlement
- Time zone: UTC+3 (MSK)
- Postal codes: 442240–442243, 442245–442249
- OKTMO ID: 56629101001

Kamenka (Russian: Ка́менка) is a town and the administrative center of Kamensky District in Penza Oblast, Russia, located on the Atmis River (a Moksha tributary) 80 kilometers (50 mi) west of Penza, the administrative center of the oblast. Population: 39,577 (2010 census); 40,712 (2002 census); 27,235 (1989 Soviet census); 30,000 (1970).

== History ==
It was founded in the 18th century and granted a town status in 1951.

== Administrative and municipal status ==
Within the framework of administrative divisions, Kamenka serves as the administrative center of Kamensky District. As an administrative division, it is incorporated within Kamensky District as the town of district significance of Kamenka. As a municipal division, the town of district significance of Kamenka is incorporated within Kamensky Municipal District as Kamenka Urban Settlement.

== Notable people ==
- Nikolay Burdenko (1876–1946), surgeon, the founder of Russian neurosurgery
- Anatoliy Chizhov (1934–2021), engineer and politician
