= Gorodishchensky Uyezd =

Subdivision of the Russian Empire

Gorodishchensky Uyezd (Городищенский уезд) was one of the subdivisions of the Penza Governorate of the Russian Empire. It was situated in the eastern part of the governorate. Its administrative centre was Gorodishche. In terms of present-day administrative borders, the territory of Gorodishchensky Uyezd is divided between the Bessonovsky, Gorodishchensky, Luninsky, Nikolsky and Sosnovoborsky districts of Penza Oblast and the Bazarnosyzgansky and Inzensky districts of Ulyanovsk Oblast.

== Demographics ==
At the time of the Russian Empire Census of 1897, Gorodishchensky Uyezd had a population of 172,602. Of these, 71.8% spoke Russian, 26.4% Mordvin and 1.6% Tatar as their native language.
