= Kovylkino =

Town in the Republic of Mordovia, Russia

Kovylkino Ковылкино
- Town

Other transcription(s)
  - Moksha: Лашма ош
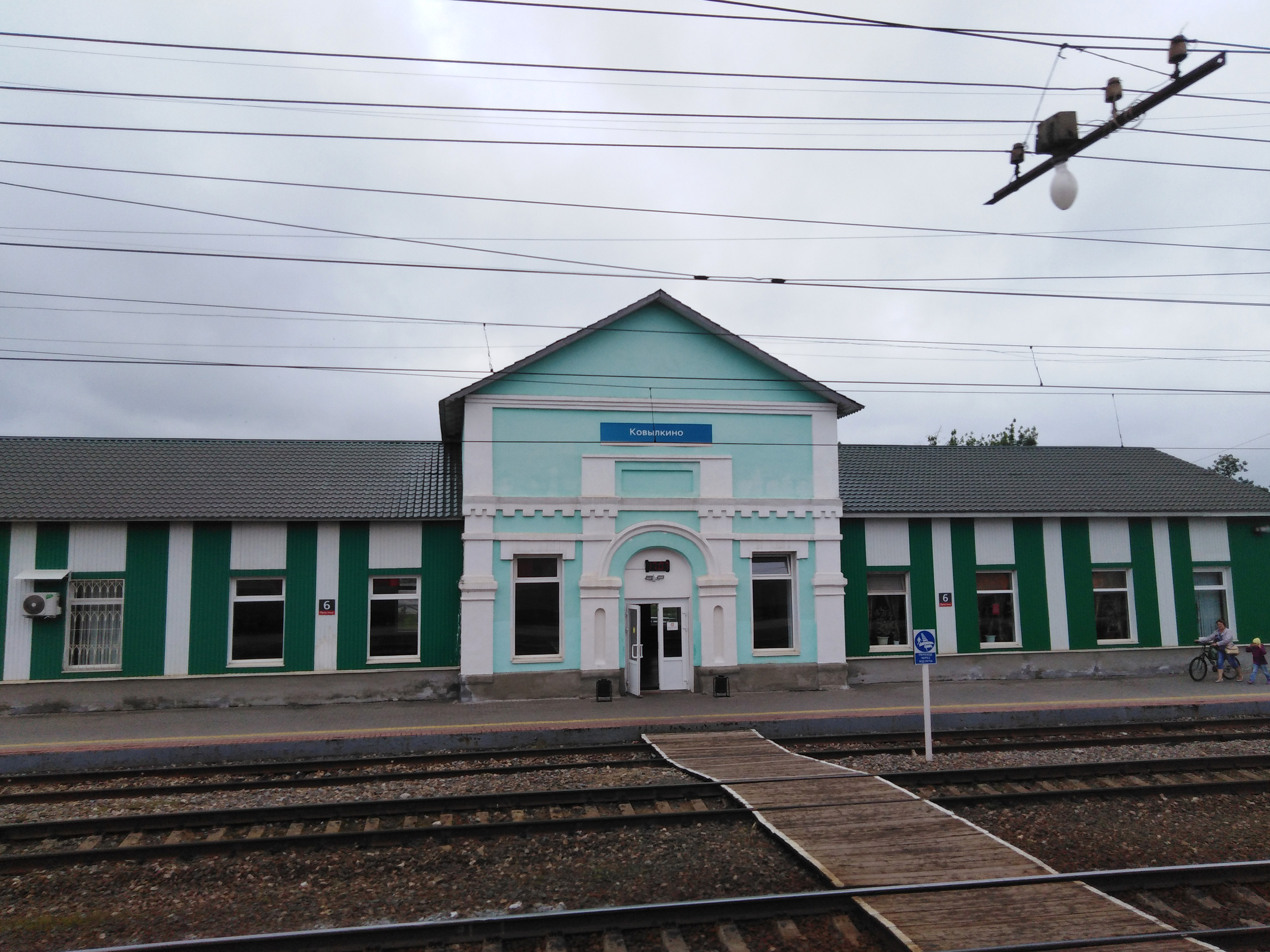
- Train station at Kovylkino

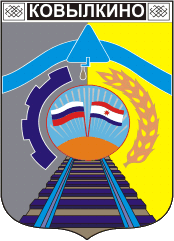
- Coat of arms
- Interactive map of Kovylkino
- Location of Kovylkino Kovylkino (Republic of Mordovia)
- Coordinates: 54°02′25″N 43°55′17″E
- Country: Russia
- Federal subject: Mordovia
- Founded: 1892
- Town status since: 1960
- Elevation: 140 m (460 ft)

Population (2010 Census)
  - Total: 21,307
  - Estimate (2021): 19,793 (−7.1%)

Administrative status
  - Subordinated to: town of republic significance of Kovylkino
  - Capital of: Kovylkinsky District, town of republic significance of Kovylkino

Municipal status
  - Municipal district: Kovylkinsky Municipal District
  - Urban settlement: Kovylkino Urban Settlement
  - Capital of: Kovylkinsky Municipal District, Kovylkino Urban Settlement
- Time zone: UTC+3 (MSK)
- Postal code: 431350–431355
- OKTMO ID: 89629101001

Kovylkino (Russian: Ковы́лкино; Moksha: Лашма ош, Lašma oš) is a town in the Republic of Mordovia, Russia, located 116 kilometers (72 mi) southwest of Saransk on the left bank of the Moksha River (a tributary of the Oka). Population: 21,307 (2010 census); 21,873 (2002 census); 21,615 (1989 Soviet census).

== History ==
Town status was granted to it in 1960.

== Administrative and municipal status ==
Within the framework of administrative divisions, Kovylkino serves as the administrative center of Kovylkinsky District, even though it is not a part of it. As an administrative division, it is, together with the settlement of Sosnovy Bor, incorporated separately as the town of republic significance of Kovylkino—an administrative unit with the status equal to that of the districts. As a municipal division, the town of republic significance of Kovylkino is incorporated within Kovylkinsky Municipal District as Kovylkino Urban Settlement.

== Infrastructure ==
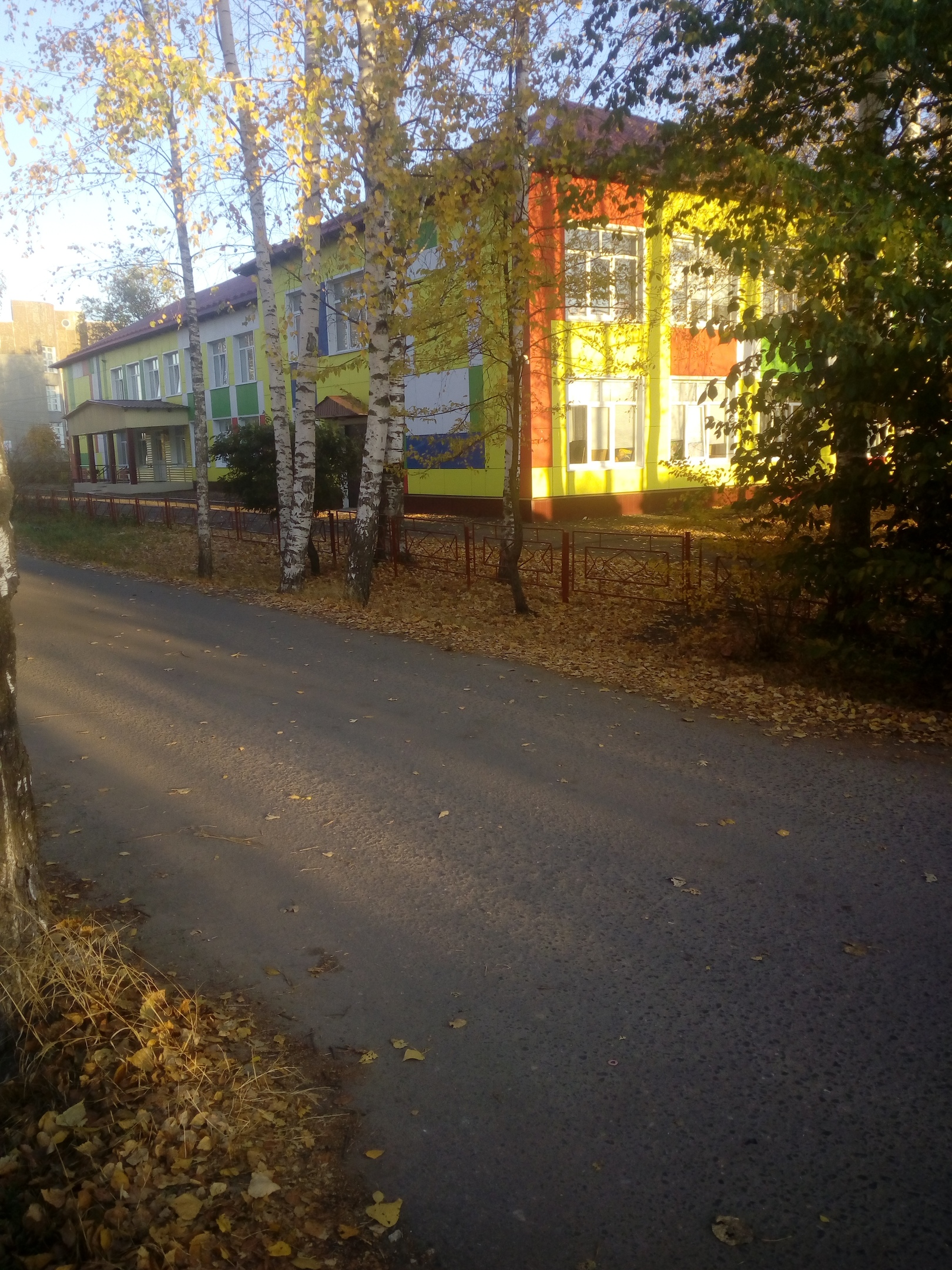
The musical school

There are more than 150 enterprises and organisations, 2 churches and an estate of Insar's monastery, 5 secondary schools, a children's summer camp "Ryzhik", a children's sanatorium "Sosnoviy Bor" in Kovylkino today. There also are a creamery, an electromechanical factory, an affiliated society of Mordovian State University, a central district hospital, a House of Culture, a Museum of local lore, as well as special schools: a musical one, an arts one, and a sports one. Kovylkinsky Agraria-building college is a local branch of Mordovian State University.

== Trade ==
- Magnit — 3 points of sale.
- Bristol — 2 points of sale.
- Euroset — 1 point of sale.
- Pyaterochka — 3 points of sale.
- Krasnoe & Beloe — 1 point of sale.
- Gorod'ok — 1 point of sale.

and other small points of sale.

Shopping centres:

- «Kouprey»
- «SpecMarket»
- «Rainbow» (Raduga/Радуга)

== Factory ==
- JSC "Kirpich silikatnyi" (currently bankrupt)
- JSC "KEMF"

== Internet and communication ==
Mobile operators:

- Rostelecom
- MTS
- Beeline
- MegaFon
- Tele2

Internet providers:

- Rostelecom
- TTK

== Notable residents ==
- Mikhail Markin (born 1993), football player
