= Anatoliy Chizhov =

Russian engineer and politician (1934–2021)

Member of the Congress of People's Deputies of the Soviet Union
- In office 1989–1991

Personal details
- Born: Anatoliy Alekseyevich Chizhov; 15 June 1934 Kamenka, Russian SFSR, Soviet Union
- Died: 24 August 2021 (aged 87)
- Party: Communist Party of the Soviet Union

Anatoliy Alekseyevich Chizhov (Russian: Анатолий Алексеевич Чижов; 15 June 1934 – 24 August 2021) was a Soviet and Russian engineer and politician. He was Director of the Progress Rocket Space Centre from 1980 to 1996 and served in the Congress of People's Deputies of the Soviet Union from 1989 to 1991. He was a recipient of the USSR State Prize in 1981 and a Hero of Socialist Labour in 1988.

== Biography ==
Chizhov was born on 15 June 1934 in the town of Kamenka in Penza Oblast. He studied at the Kazan Aviation Institute from 1955 to 1960 and then began working at the Progress Rocket Space Centre plant in Samara. He worked at the plant until 1977, serving as an engineer and an advisor to the Soviet crewed lunar programs, such as Energia and Orlets-1.

On 6 September 1978, the Supreme Soviet of the Soviet Union honored Chizhov with induction into the Order of the Red Banner of Labour. In 1981, the Central Committee of the Communist Party of the Soviet Union and the Council of Ministers of the Soviet Union awarded him the USSR State Prize. On 10 October 1988, the Supreme Soviet awarded him as a Hero of Socialist Labour, a "Hammer and Sickle" gold medal, and inducted him into the Order of Lenin.

Chizhov was also engaged in political work, serving in the Congress of People's Deputies of the Soviet Union from 1989 to 1991 as a member of the Communist Party of the Soviet Union. He also served on the Committee of Defense and State Security for the Supreme Soviet. He retired in 1996 and lived in Moscow.

Anatoliy Chizhov died on 24 August 2021, at the age of 87. He was buried in the Federal Military Memorial Cemetery.
