= Mokshansky Uyezd =

Uyezd in Penza Governorate, Russian Empire

Mokshansky Uyezd (Russian: Мокшанский уезд) was one of the subdivisions of the Penza Governorate of the Russian Empire. It was situated in the central part of the governorate. Its administrative centre was Mokshan. In terms of present-day administrative borders, the territory of Mokshansky Uyezd is divided between the Bessonovsky, Issinsky, Luninsky and Mokshansky districts of Penza Oblast.

== Demographics ==
At the time of the Russian Empire Census of 1897, Mokshansky Uyezd had a population of 109,052. Of these, 98.1% spoke Russian, 1.6% Tatar and 0.1% Mordvin as their native language.
