= Ivan Fedorovich Choultsé =

Russian painter (1874–1939)

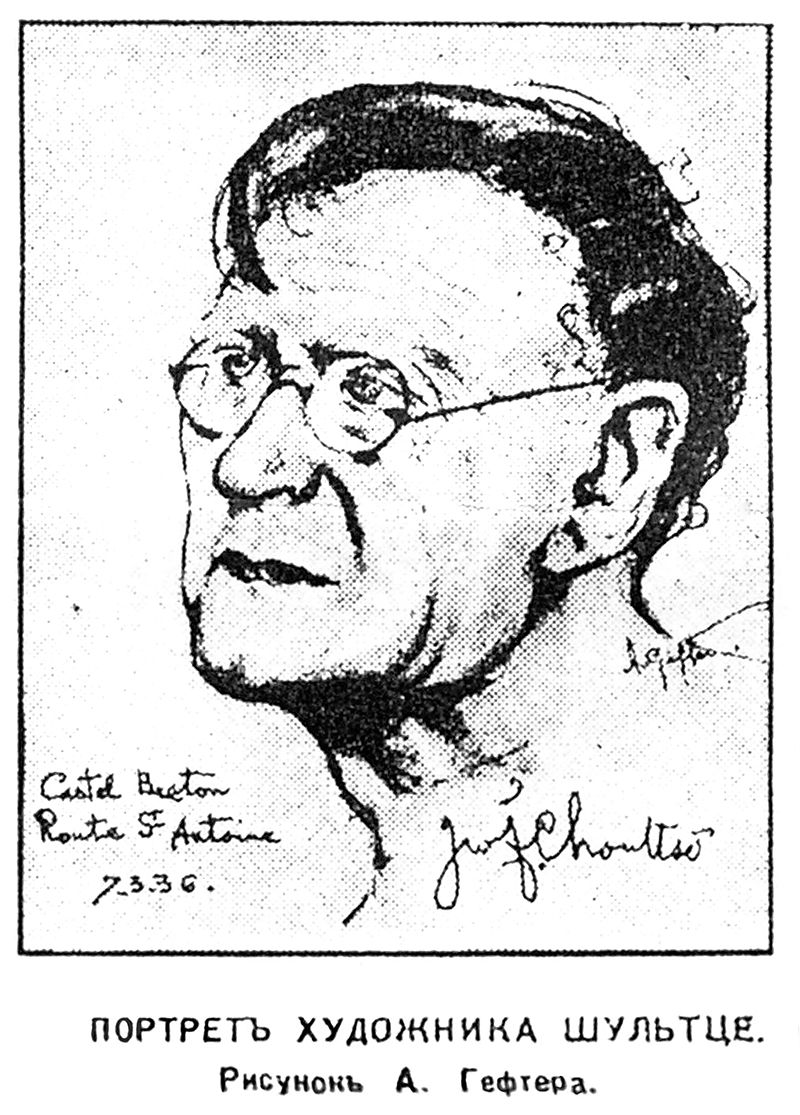
Portrait of Ivan Choultsé

Ivan Fedorovich Choultsé (October 21, 1874–1939) was a Russian landscape painter who emigrated to France after the Russian Revolution and then later to the United States. He died in Nice, France in 1939.

== Biography ==
=== Early years ===
Choultsé was born in Saint Petersburg, Russia on October 21, 1874. His family was of German origin – the original spelling of his family name was Schultze – but they had lived in Russia since the 17th century.

Choultsé originally studied electrical engineering at the same time as trying to paint landscapes. At the age of thirty he showed his first attempts to Konstantin Kryzhitsky, a Ukrainian painter and member of the Russian Academy of Fine Arts, who invited Choultsé to study art. In 1910 Choultsé travelled to Spitzbergen with Kryzhitsky, where he painted many arctic landscapes in the Spitzbergen archipelago, including Datskiy Island, Medvezhiy Island, and Saint Magdalene's Bay. Apart from Kryzhitsky, other significant influences on Choultsé were the Russian painter Arkhip Kuindzhi and the Swiss painter Alexandre Calame.

After Kuindzhi died in 1910 and Kryzhitsky committed suicide in 1911 Choultsé began to master his own style of painting, frequently participating in exhibitions held by Grand Duchess Olga Alexandrovna (1882–1960) in her palace on Sergeevskaya street, 46/48 (now Tchaikovskogo Street). She was also a pupil of Kryzhitsky and founded a society in his name.

By 1916 Choultsé had become a widely famous artist, with members of the Tsar's family acquiring his works, including Nicholas II's brother Michael Alexandrovich and Grand Duke Grigoriy Mikhailovich. The Tsar himself was not much interested as Choultsé later noted, observing that Nicholas II displayed no interest in landscapes or still lives as they "told no story". Some of Choultsé's works were bought by Сarl Fabergé, and the development of postcards contributed greatly to Choultsé's success, with the printing of his works on these "open letters" making him famous throughout Russia.

=== Revolutionary period ===
Like many "academic" painters Choultsé was in a state of great uncertainty during the revolutionary years and decided to go on a lengthy trip to Europe which lasted from 1917 till 1919. During that time he painted many views of the Swiss Alps, southern France, and northern Italy. After returning to Russia briefly on a few occasions after that trip he returned to his homeland more permanently in 1921 in an attempt to win the attention of the Soviet public. He joined the Society of Individualistic Painters in Petrograd alongside Isaak Izrailevich Brodsky (1883–1939), Ivan Avgustovich Veltz (1866–1926), Juliy Julievich Klever (1850–1924), and Aleksandr Vladimirovich Makovsky (1869–1924), and took part in the society's first two exhibitions. But ultimately he decided to emigrate for life.

=== French period ===
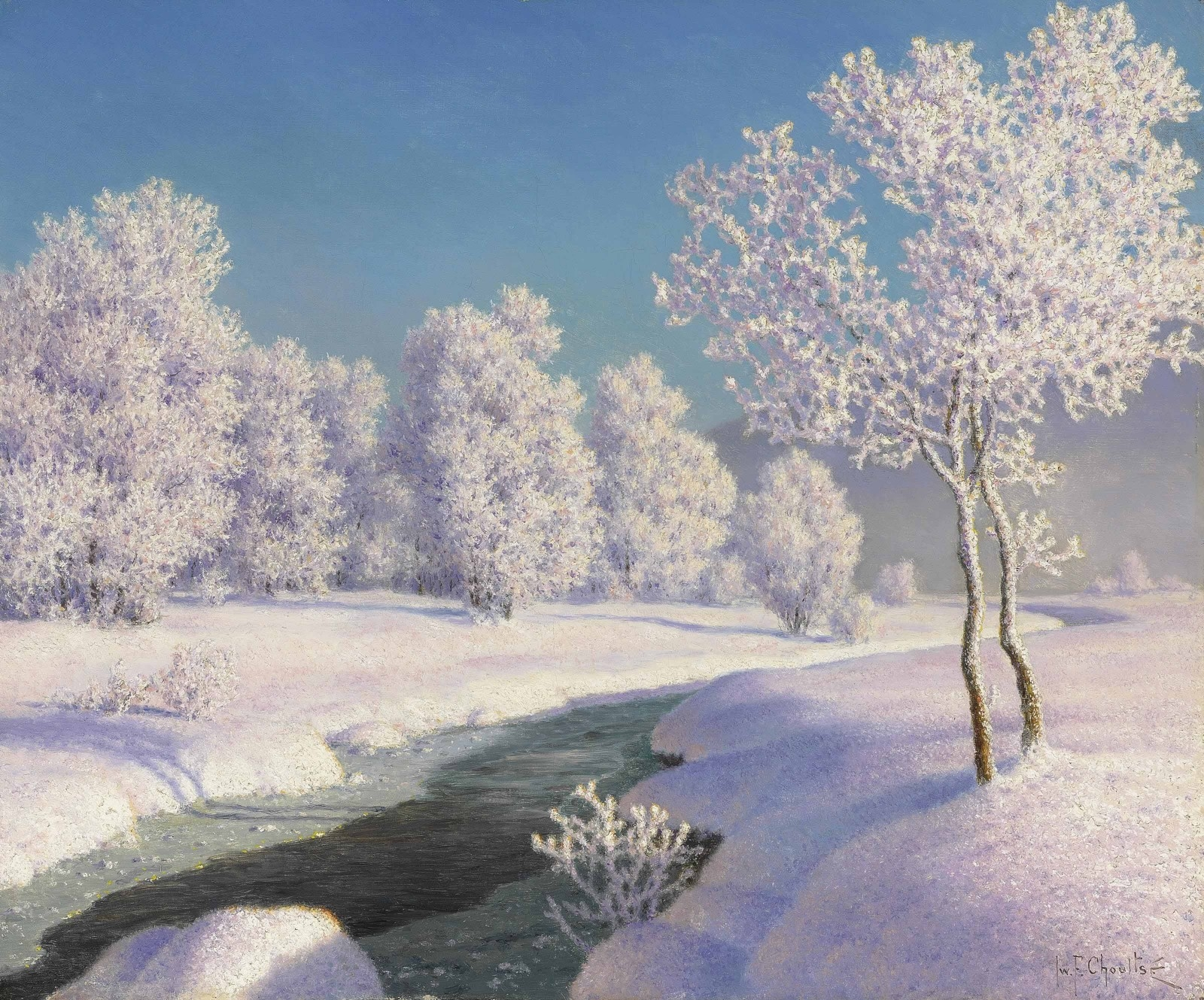
Winter landscape

Choultsé emigrated to France and moved into Boulevard Pereire, 121 in Paris. There he tried to penetrate the artistic milieu of Paris even though it was overloaded at that time by both immigrants and the rise of many French painters.

Choultsé's first solo exhibition of 50 works opened on November 23, 1922 at Rue La Boétie, 2, and the Léon Gérard Gallery later exhibited his "Soir de Novembre" ("November evening") at the 136th Salon des Artistes Francais in 1923 and "Derniers rayons" ("The Last Rays of Light") at the 137th Salon. The gallery then held annual solo exhibitions of Choultsé's work until 1925.

Choultsé received French citizenship in 1927.

=== American period ===
On March 16, 1927 a solo exhibition of Choultsé's work opened in Arthur Tooth & Sons Gallery at 155 New Bond Street, London. The London journal The Studio (1927, Vol. 93) described the event as a sensation in the field of classical painting, with Choultsé demonstrating a new approach to landscape and thereby evoking a wave of interest in the old genre.

His European fame became international. Édouard Jonas, a prominent figure in both the French and international art markets and owner of exhibition halls in both Paris and New York, offered to exhibit Choultsé's works in the United States. On December 1, 1928, Choultsé's exhibition opened at Jonas's New York City gallery at 9 East 56th Street with the slogan "It must be seen to be believed". The exhibition ran from November 15, 1929 until January 1, 1930 and the 68 works found buyers in the United States, Canada, Argentina, and Mexico.

Choultsé moved to Nice, France in the mid-1930s, but exhibitions of his work were held in New York City in April 1936, April 1940, and May 1943, and in Oklahoma City in May/June 1938 after his departure for France.

=== Death ===
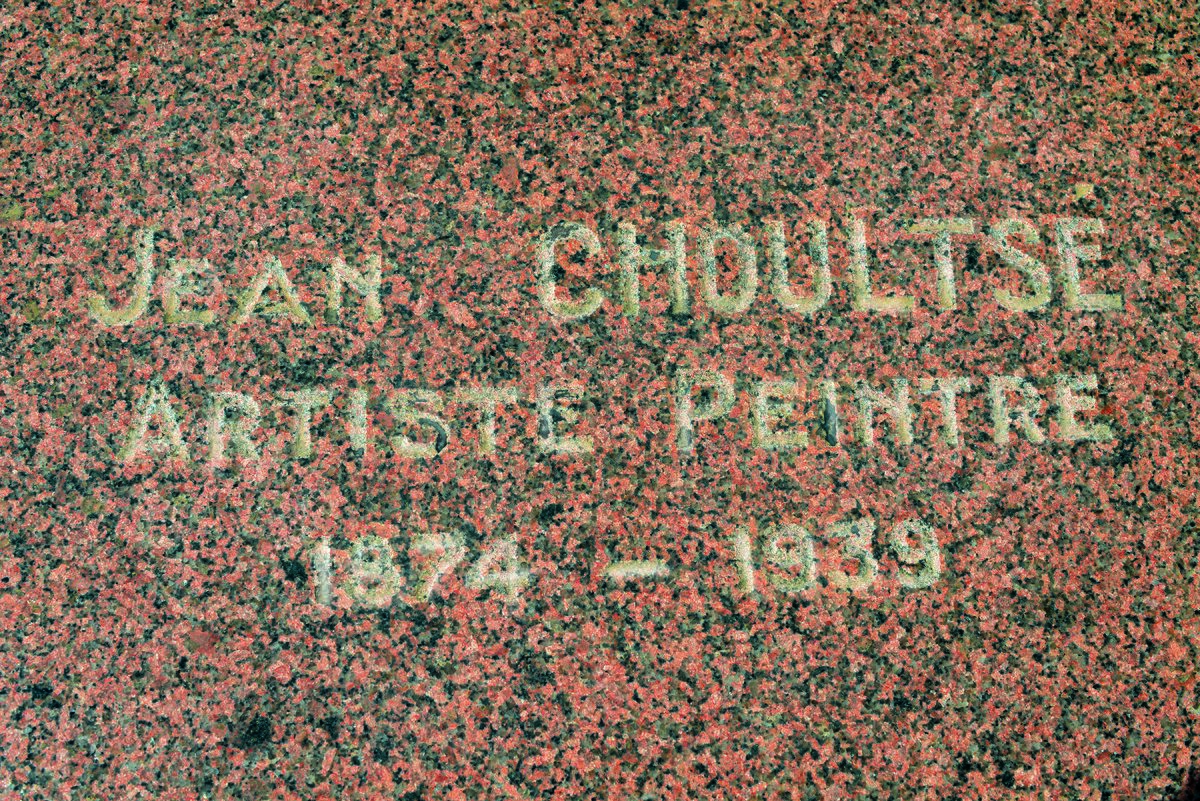
Gravestone of Choultsé in the Russian Orthodox Cemetery, Nice

The last reliable account of Choultsé comes from Alexander Iosifovich Gefter (1885–1956), a marine painter, mason, and member of various underground Anti-Bolshevik organisations. He saw Choultsé on March 7, 1936 during a meeting of Russian emigrees in Breton Castle, Nice. Choultsé's gravestone in the Nice Russian Orthodox Cemetery states the year of his death as 1939.

== Works ==
Choultsé celebrated all of nature throughout his life, but his artistic world was a world without people or animals. The most important elements of his paintings were snow and water, and his preferred type of landscape was a winter view, frequently not Russian but Swiss. He was called a "magician of light" because of the almost magic realism of his paintings, with Toronto art dealer G. Blair Laing writing:

He painted spectacular snow scenes in which the light seems to come from behind the canvas and glow. The critics scorned these pictures as photographic and called them non-art – but today this style of painting is called "magic-realism" and is much admired by critics and museum people.

Choultsé's works are scarce in Russia, with the Saint Petersburg Arctic and Antarctic Museum and the Dagestan Fine Arts Museum being the only Russian museums to hold his works. However, his paintings can be found in American and Canadian collections such as the Hillwood Museum in Washington D.C., Washington State University Museum of Art, Indianapolis Museum of Art, and Montreal Museum of Fine Arts, and many of his works are in private collections.

Works by Choultsé

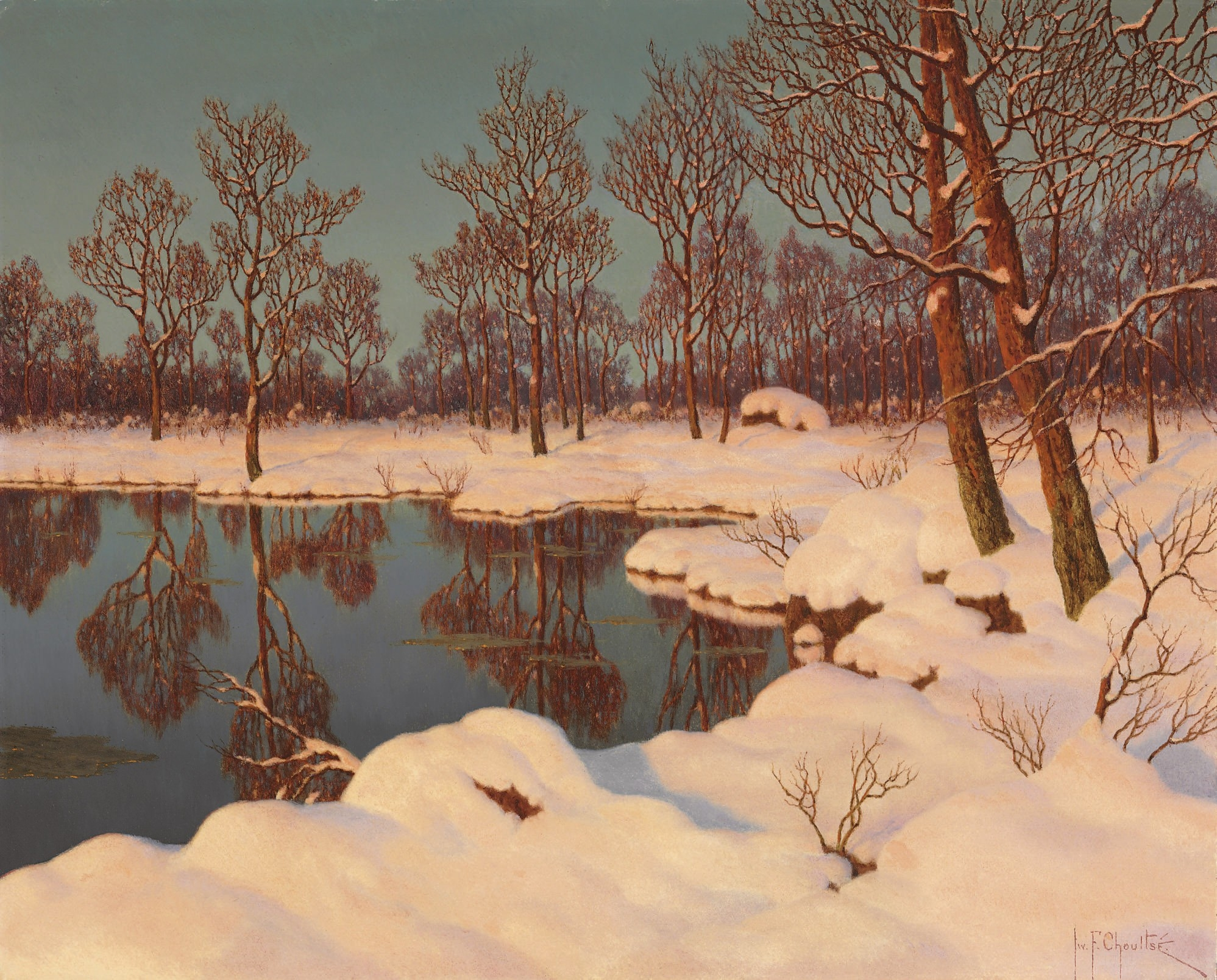
Winter sunset

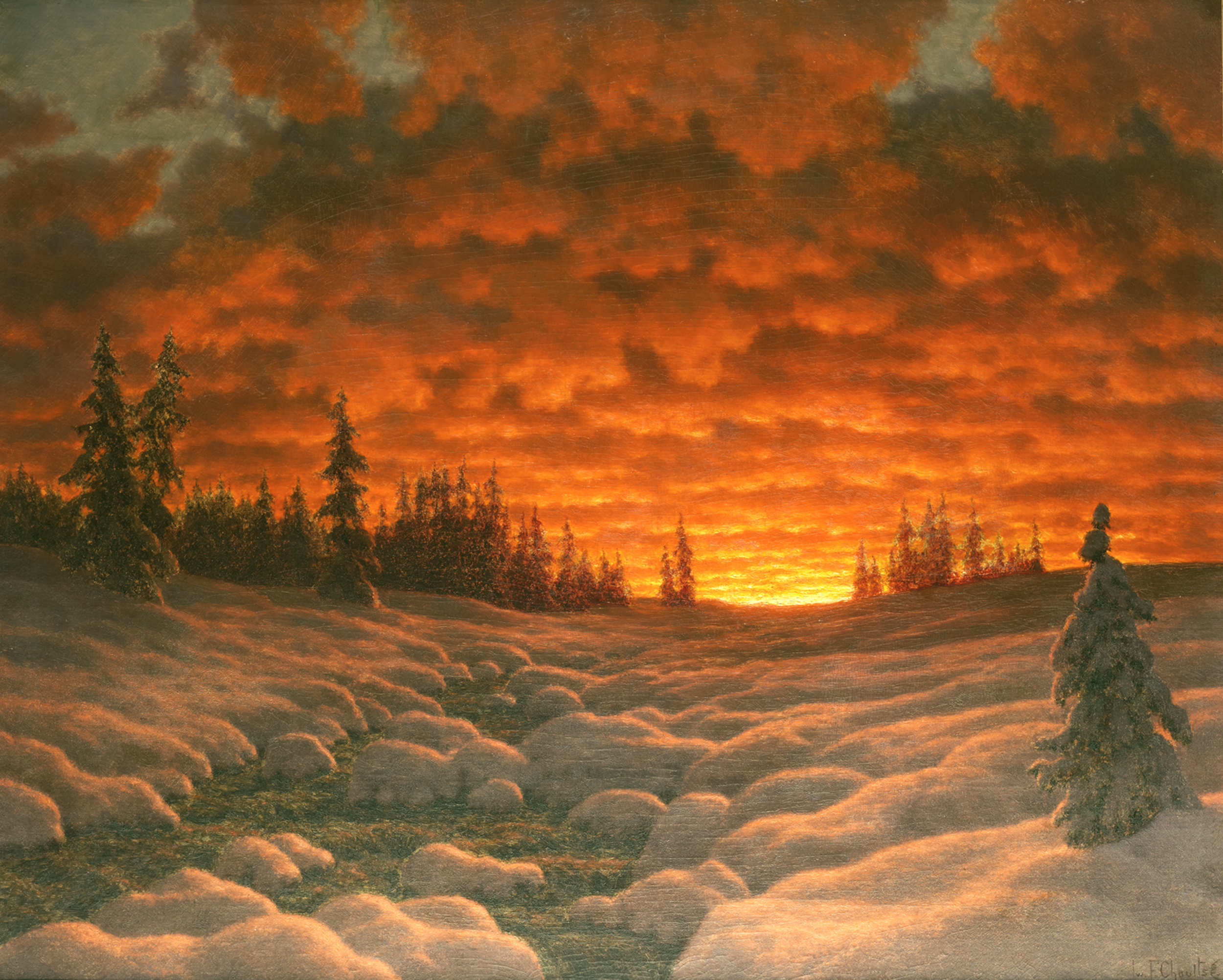
Winter Sunset (1920s)

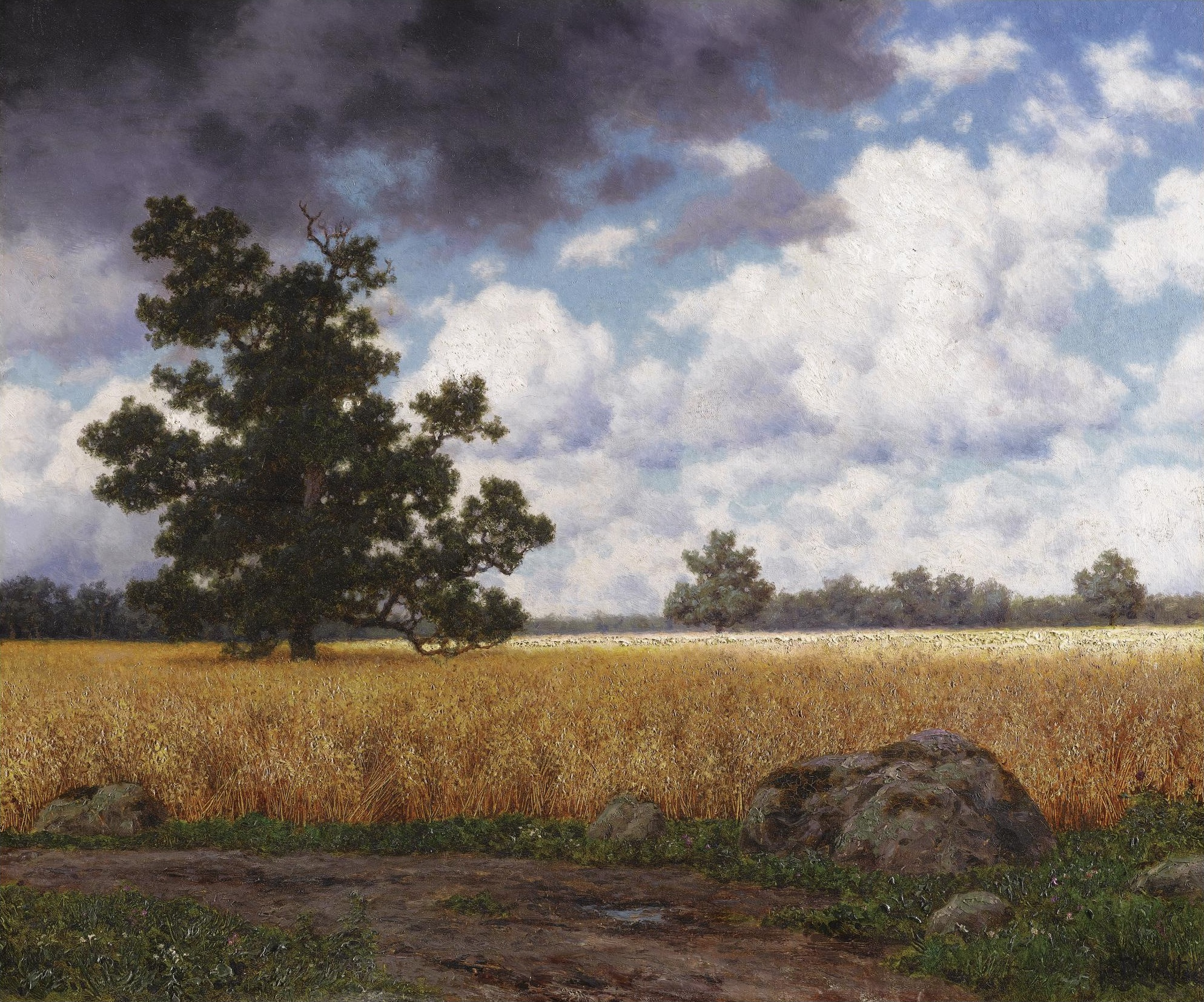
Wheatfields

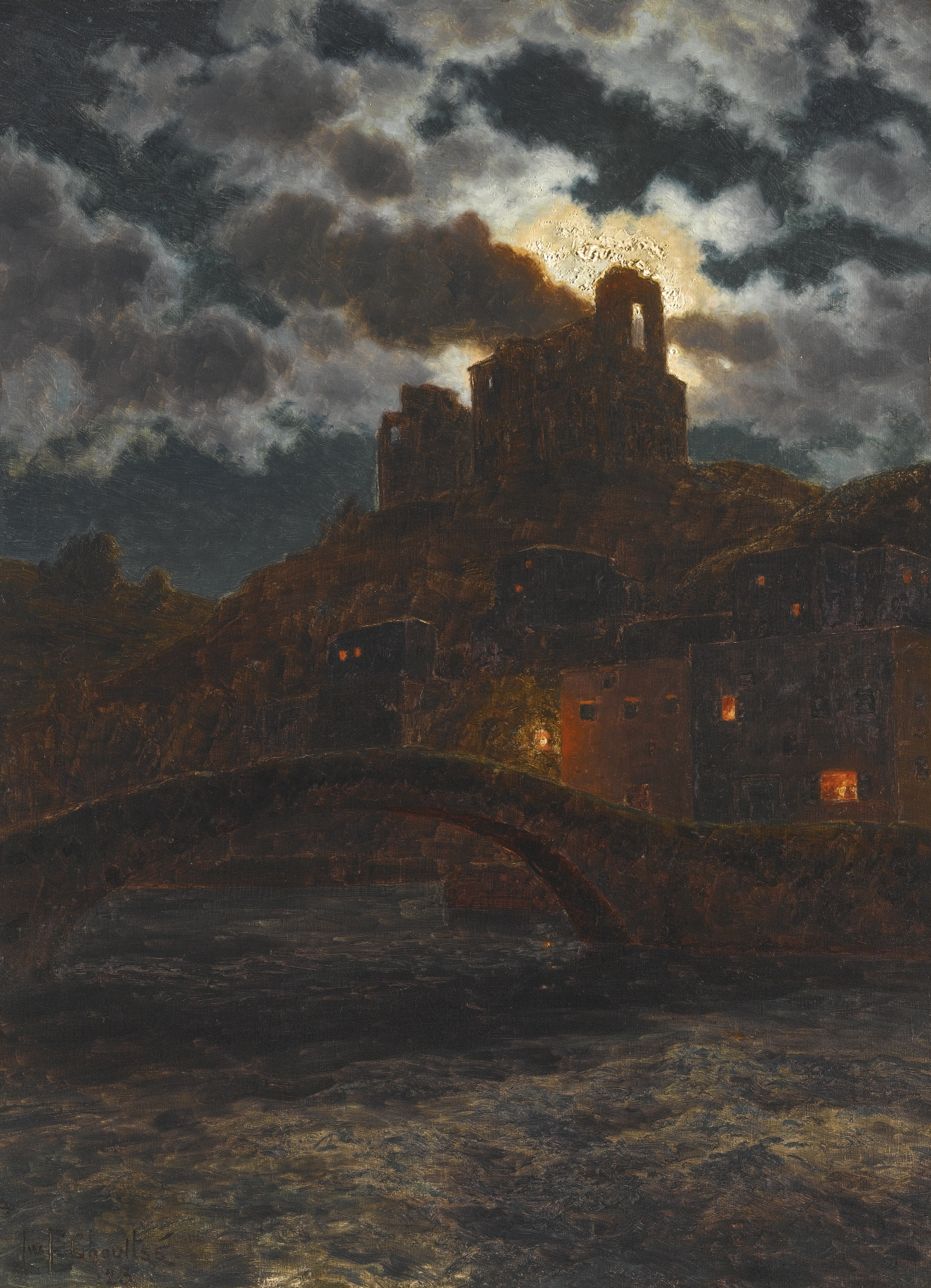
On the banks at twilight

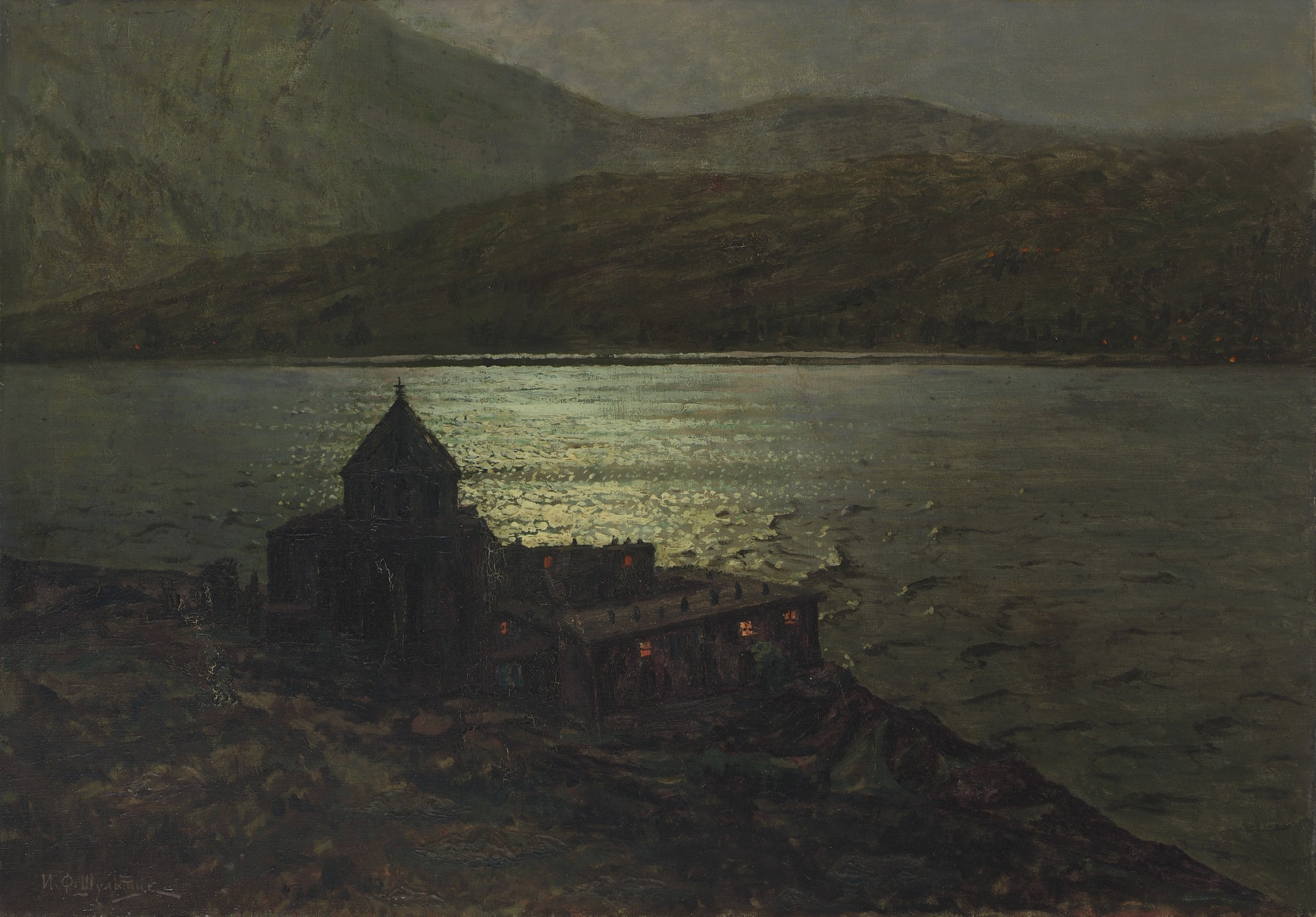
Sevanavank Monastery on Lake Sevan

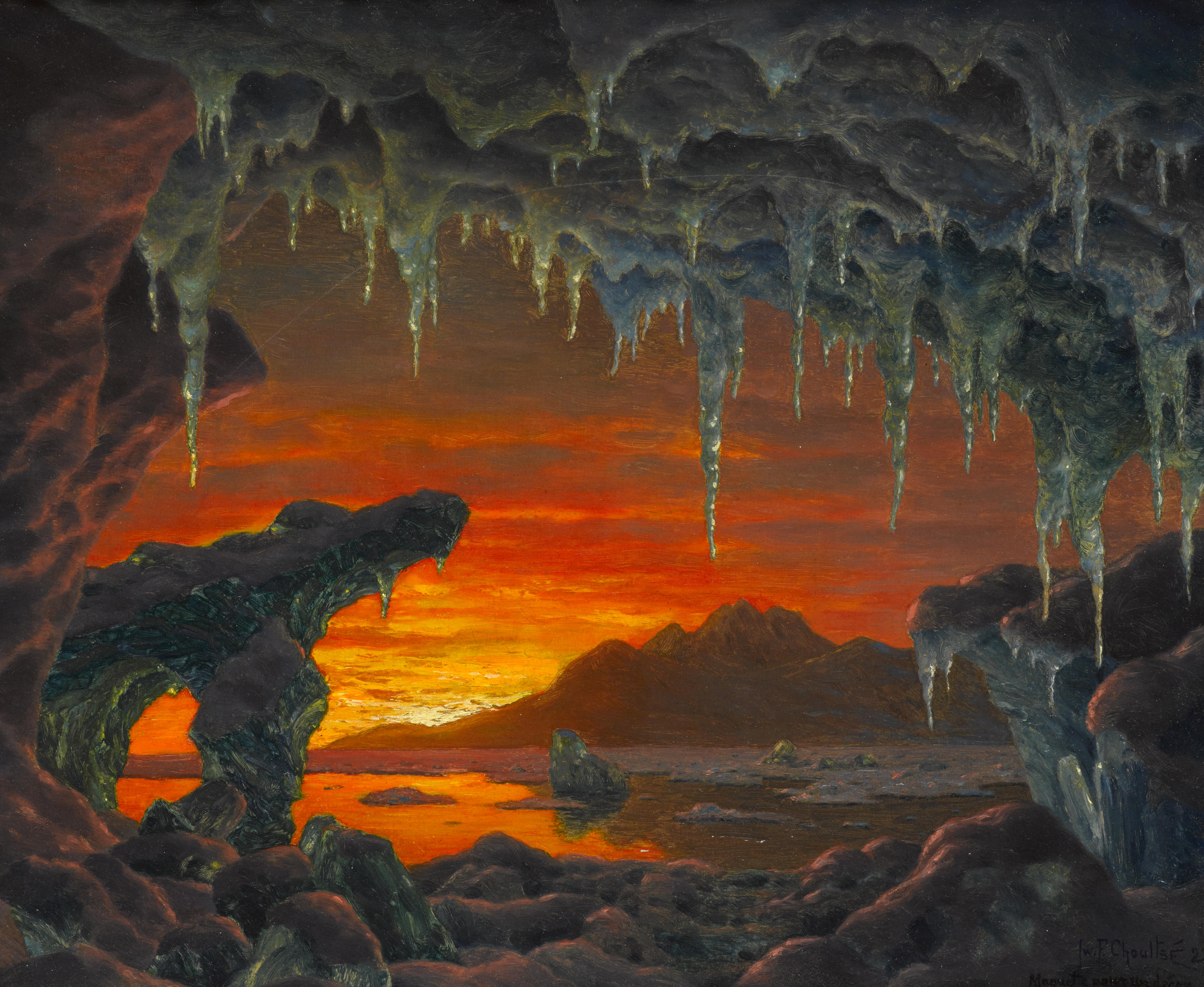
Maquette pour un Décor Grotte Arctique
