= Narovchatsky Uyezd =

Narovchatsky Uyezd (Наровчатский уезд) was one of the subdivisions of the Penza Governorate of the Russian Empire. It was situated in the northwestern part of the governorate. Its administrative centre was Narovchat. In terms of present-day administrative borders, the territory of Narovchatsky Uyezd is divided between the Narovchatsky and Spassky districts of Penza Oblast and the Insarsky and Kovylkinsky districts of Mordovia.

== Demographics ==
At the time of the Russian Empire Census of 1897, Narovchatsky Uyezd had a population of 229,118. Of these, 86.3% spoke Russian and 13.6% Mordvin as their native language.
