= Mikhail Markin =

Russian footballer

Personal information
- Full name: Mikhail Mikhailovich Markin
- Date of birth: 21 November 1993 (age 32)
- Place of birth: Kovylkino, Russia
- Height: 1.79 m (5 ft 10 in)
- Position: Forward

Youth career
- Mordovia Saransk

Senior career*
| Years | Team | Apps | (Gls) |
| 2011–2016 | Mordovia Saransk | 45 | (3) |
| 2015 | → Khimki (loan) | 9 | (1) |
| 2015 | → Tyumen (loan) | 8 | (0) |
| 2016–2017 | Zenit Penza | 17 | (8) |
| 2017–2019 | Mordovia Saransk | 36 | (5) |
| 2019 | → Zenit-2 Saint Petersburg (loan) | 13 | (5) |
| 2019–2021 | Baltika Kaliningrad | 58 | (18) |
| 2021 | Torpedo Moscow | 3 | (1) |
| 2022 | Kuban Krasnodar | 11 | (2) |
| 2022–2023 | Leningradets | 38 | (21) |
| 2024 | Spartak Kostroma | 15 | (4) |
| 2024 | Maxline Vitebsk | 13 | (10) |
| 2025 | Slavia Mozyr | 2 | (1) |
| 2025 | Irtysh Omsk | 8 | (0) |

International career
| 2010 | Russia U-17 | 2 | (1) |
| 2013 | Russia U-20 | 2 | (0) |
- * Club domestic league appearances and goals as of 18 October 2025

Mikhail Mikhailovich Markin (Russian: Михаил Михайлович Маркин; born 21 November 1993) is a Russian football striker.

== Club career ==
He made his debut in the FNL for FC Mordovia Saransk on 14 June 2011 in a game against FC Baltika Kaliningrad. He made his Russian Premier League debut for Mordovia on 31 August 2012 in a game against FC Zenit Saint Petersburg.

On 18 June 2019, he signed a contract with FC Baltika Kaliningrad for two years with an additional one-year extension option.
