= Kovylkinsky District =

Kovylkinsky District Ковылкинский район (Russian)
- District

Other transcription(s)
  - Moksha: Лашмонь район
  - Erzya: Ковёлбуе
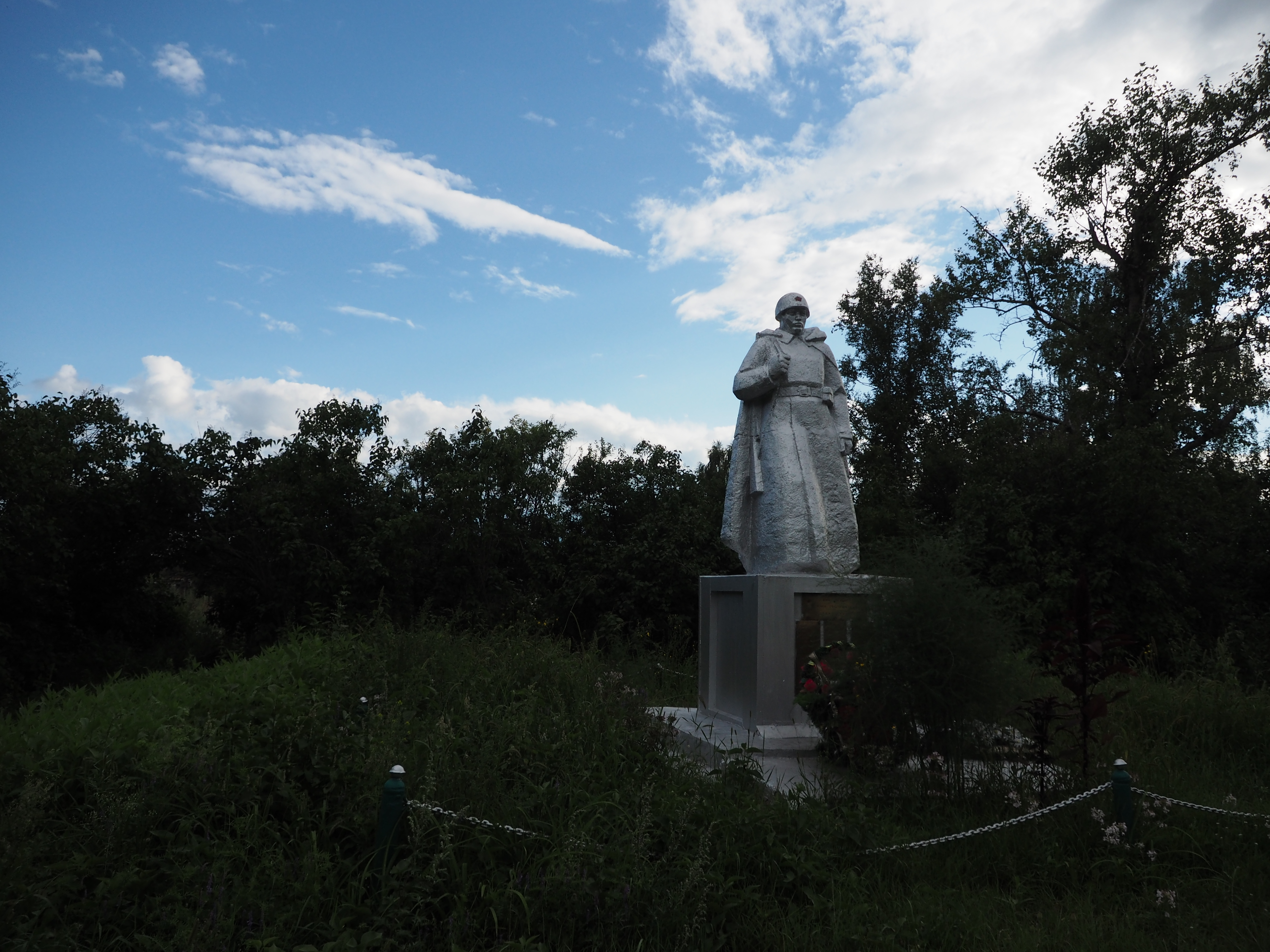
- Monument to Unknown Soldier, Kovylkinsky District

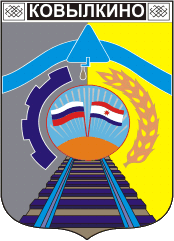
- Coat of arms
- Location of Kovylkinsky District in the Republic of Mordovia
- Coordinates: 54°02′N 43°55′E
- Country: Russia
- Federal subject: Republic of Mordovia
- Established: 16 July 1928
- Administrative center: Kovylkino

Area
  - Total: 2,013 km^{2} (777 sq mi)

Population (2010 Census)
  - Total: 22,523
  - Density: 11.19/km^{2} (28.98/sq mi)
  - Urban: 0%
  - Rural: 100%

Administrative structure
  - Administrative divisions: 21 Selsoviets
  - Inhabited localities: 106 rural localities

Municipal structure
  - Municipally incorporated as: Kovylkinsky Municipal District
  - Municipal divisions: 1 urban settlements, 21 rural settlements
- Time zone: UTC+3 (MSK)
- OKTMO ID: 89629000
- Website: http://www.kovilkino13.ru

Population of Kovylkinsky District
- 2010 Census: 22,523
- 2002 Census: 25,488
- 1989 Census: 33,488
- 1979 Census: 47,727

Kovylkinsky District (Russian: Ковы́лкинский райо́н; Moksha: Лашмонь аймак, Lašmoń ajmak; Erzya: Ковёлбуе, Kovölbuje) is an administrative and municipal district (raion), one of the twenty-two in the Republic of Mordovia, Russia. It is located in the south of the republic. The area of the district is 2,013 square kilometers (777 sq mi). Its administrative center is the town of Kovylkino (which is not administratively a part of the district). As of the 2010 Census, the total population of the district was 22,523.

== Administrative and municipal status ==
Within the framework of administrative divisions, Kovylkinsky District is one of the twenty-two in the republic. The district is divided into 21 selsoviets which comprise 106 rural localities. The town of Kovylkino serves as its administrative center, despite being incorporated separately as a town of republic significance—an administrative unit with the status equal to that of the districts.

As a municipal division, the district is incorporated as Kovylkinsky Municipal District, with the town of republic significance of Kovylkino being incorporated within it as Kovylkino Urban Settlement. Its twenty-one selsoviets are incorporated as twenty-one rural settlements within the municipal district. The town of Kovylkino serves as the administrative center of the municipal district as well.

== Notable people ==
Soviet/Russian artist Fedot Sychkov was born in 1870 in the territory of modern Kovylkinsky District, in the selo of Kochelayevo. Sychkov museum was opened in 1970.

Footballer Mikhail Markin was born in 1993 in Kovylkino.
