= Kamensky District, Penza Oblast =

Kamensky District Каменский район (Russian)
- District
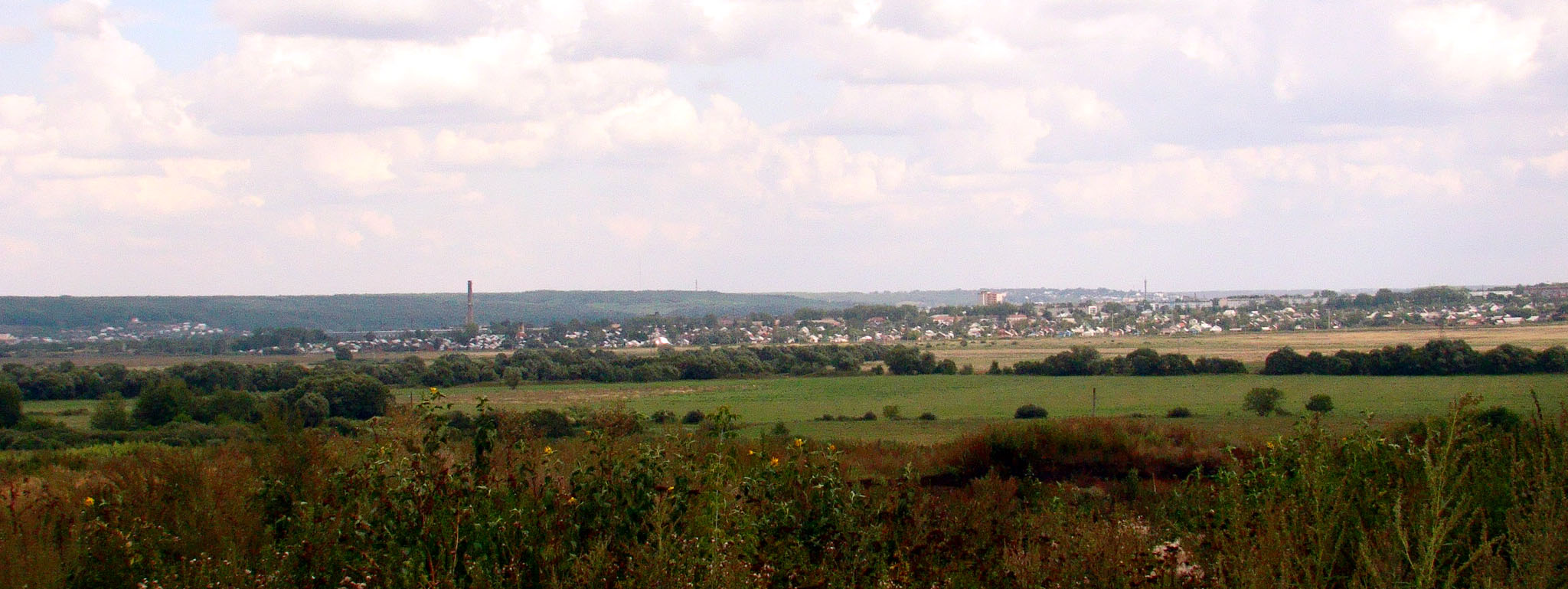
- View of the town of Kamenka, the administrative center of Kamensky District

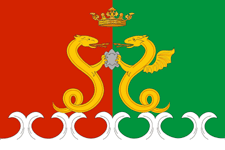
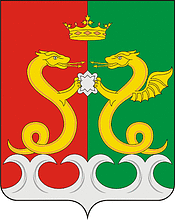
- Flag Coat of arms
- Location of Kamensky District in Penza Oblast
- Coordinates: 53°11′N 44°03′E
- Country: Russia
- Federal subject: Penza Oblast
- Established: 16 July 1928
- Administrative center: Kamenka

Area
  - Total: 2,174 km^{2} (839 sq mi)

Population (2010 Census)
  - Total: 62,322
  - Density: 28.67/km^{2} (74.25/sq mi)
  - Urban: 63.5%
  - Rural: 36.5%

Administrative structure
  - Administrative divisions: 1 Towns of district significance, 11 Selsoviets
  - Inhabited localities: 1 cities/towns, 64 rural localities

Municipal structure
  - Municipally incorporated as: Kamensky Municipal District
  - Municipal divisions: 1 urban settlements, 11 rural settlements
- Time zone: UTC+3 (MSK)
- OKTMO ID: 56629000
- Website: http://rkamen.pnzreg.ru/

Kamensky District (Russian: Ка́менский райо́н) is an administrative and municipal district (raion), one of the twenty-seven in Penza Oblast, Russia. It is located in the western central part of the oblast. The area of the district is 2,174 square kilometers (839 sq mi). Its administrative center is the town of Kamenka. Population: 62,322 (2010 Census); 24,275 (2002 census); 27,235 (1989 Soviet census). The population of Kamenka accounts for 63.5% of the district's total population.
