= Penza Governorate =

1780–1928 unit of Russia

Coordinates: 53.2000°N 45.0000°E

Penza Governorate Пензенская губерния
- Governorate of the Russian Empire
- 1780–1928
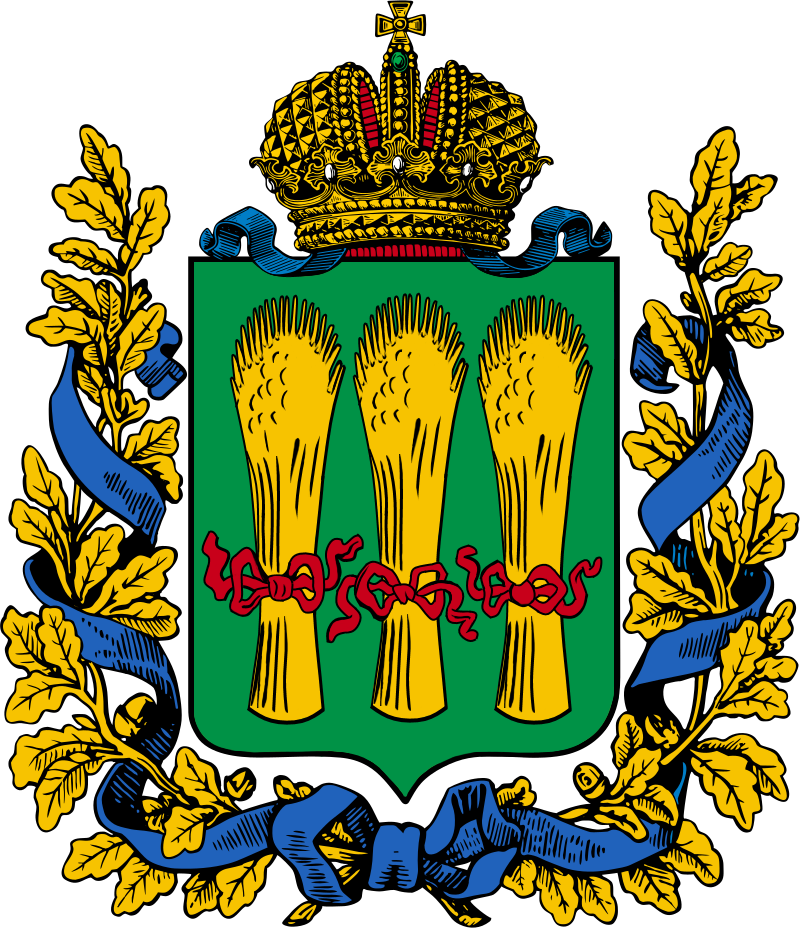
- Coat of arms

- Location in the Russian Empire
- Area
  - 1897: 36,408 km^{2} (14,057 sq mi)
- Population
  - 1897: 1,470,474
- History
  - Established: 15 September 1780
  - Disestablished: 14 May 1928
Preceded by	Succeeded by
Penza province	Penza Okrug

Penza Governorate (Russian: Пензенская губерния, romanized: Penzenskaya guberniya) was an administrative-territorial unit (guberniya) of the Russian Empire and Russian SFSR, located in the Volga Region. It existed from 1780 to 1797 and again from 1801 to 1928; its capital was in Penza.

== Uyezds ==
Penza Governorate was subdivided into ten uyezds:

- Gorodishchensky Uyezd
- Insarsky Uyezd
- Kerensky Uyezd
- Krasnoslobodsky Uyezd
- Mokshansky Uyezd
- Narovchatsky Uyezd
- Nizhnelomovsky Uyezd
- Penzensky Uyezd
- Saransky Uyezd
- Chembarsky Uyezd

== Demographics ==
At the time of the Russian Empire Census of 1897, Penza Governorate had a population of 1,470,474. Of these, 83.0% spoke Russian, 12.8% Mordvin, 4.0% Tatar, 0.1% Ukrainian and 0.1% Polish as their native language.
