= Cholponbai =

1958 novel by Fedor Samokhin

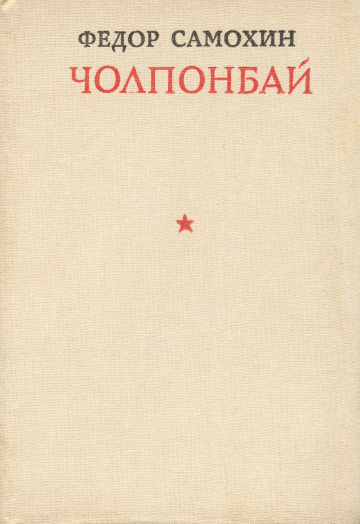
- The cover of the second edition
- Author: Fedor Samokhin
- Original title: Чолпонбай
- Language: Russian, Kyrgyz (fragments)
- Genre: novel
- Publisher: The Kyrgyz State Publishing House (1958); Molodaya Gvardiya (1958); Mektep (1982)
- Publication date: 1958
- Publication place: Soviet Union
- Media type: Print (hard & paperback)
- Website: Digitized novel in the Internet Archive

Cholponbai (Russian: Чолпонбай; Kyrgyz: Чолпонбай) is a novel by Soviet writer Fedor Samokhin, published in 1958 by the Kyrgyz State Publishing House and the "Molodaya Gvardiya". It is dedicated to the Hero of the Soviet Union Cholponbai Tuleberdiev, describing his life, the evolution of life views and the growth of self-awareness, starting from childhood. The plot is divided into three chapters: "Schooldays", "Harsh Time" and "The Don steppes on fire", each of which leads the main character to perform a feat. The story also raises topics such as friendship of peoples, women's rights issues, the struggle against patriarchy, cruel methods of parenting and outdated customs.

To write a story based on historical facts, the writer visited the hero's homeland, traveled to the places of battles in which he took part, worked in archives, met personally, and also got acquainted by correspondence with his friends and associates. In critical articles, the novel was called the author's main achievement, the newspaper "Sovetskaya Kultura" attributed it to works that "adorn the multicolored carpet of Kyrgyz literature," and the magazine "Literary Kyrgyzstan" put it on a par with works that are "more widely and comprehensively developed in content, style and aesthetics." In 1982, the novel was republished by the Kyrgyz state educational and pedagogical publishing house "Mektep", in 2019 it was digitized by the Osh Regional Library named T. Satylganov, and in 2020 it was included in the section with materials from the Ministry of Education and Science of Kyrgyzstan for schools of the republic. Fragments were translated into Kyrgyz. Located in the department of rare and especially valuable publications of the National Library of the Kyrgyz Republic.

Fedor Samokhin continued the theme of Cholponbai Tuleberdiev's feat in the essay "Krov'yu serdttsa", which the Belarusian writer Vasil Bykaŭ included in his collection of proze works "Molodye geroi Velikoi Otechestvennoi voiny", published in the series "Zhizn' zamechatel'nyh lyudei". In the preface to the collection, Bykov attributed this essay to works "in which everything is not equal," but they are "strong first of all with their genuine sincerity, the desire to convey to posterity the courageous and bright features of young heroes".

== Plot ==
=== Chapter 1. "School days" ===
On the first pages of the story, Cholponbai appears to readers as a seventeen-year-old boy. He, participating in district horse races, takes first place and is awarded an Honorary district diploma with a pocket watch. The victory did not turn his head — Cholponbai understood that he still had to study and work a lot to win the respect of the people and become a support for his family. After the competition, Cholponbai returns home to the Telman village, where the reader can get to know his family. The head of the family Tuleberdy Tarakulov died after a long illness in 1935, six years ago. Only Surake's mother remained, who raised five children. They lived poorly, but by the forty-first year there was prosperity in the Surake's house. In the "squat adobe house" of the Tuleberdievs, the celebration of the victory of Cholponbai began, but a friend of the late father, Dulat, comes with the news that war has begun in Europe. Surake's mother was "horrified" and compares the events with basmachism, she is afraid to remember, although it was a long time ago: "There is no need for war… I remember how the Basmachi mocked people." Everyone present in the house understands that something inevitable and menacing is coming.

The novel also shows the school of the main character. It has a whole gallery of his teachers and classmates. Cholponbai himself appears to readers as a modest and even somewhat shy young man, persistent in his studies, thoughtful and responsive to his classmates. He is ready to help all laggards, but sometimes the desire to help a friend out of trouble leads him to serious mistakes. For example, the story describes a scene when Cholponbai helps his school friend Sagymbek out of trouble. Sagymbek, being fond of horses, starts studying. His father Duishembi comes to the village from the pasture, to whom the son must report on his successes. To avoid punishment, Sagymbek asks Cholponbai, an excellent student, to give him his notebooks. Cholponbai, realizing that he is doing wrong, still helps out a classmate. Later, Cholponbai himself gets into a bad situation because of this. This case did him good: he realized that it was necessary to help a classmate not by hiding his shortcomings, but on the contrary, they should be openly and honestly criticized. Sagymbek runs away from home to his uncle Umar out of shame. Cholponbai finds him and puts up with him. Uncle Umar tells the children about his meeting and conversation with the poet Toktogul Satylganov in the year when kolkhozes were created and the bai "raged".

Before graduating from school, Cholponbai passes his first exam — an essay on native literature. After reading out the essay by the teacher Sultan-ake, Cholponbai chooses "The creative activity of poet Toktogul Satylganov". "The day of the fifteenth of June, one thousand nine hundred and forty-first year was the last day at school," Cholponbai is given a certificate of completion of seven years, and the young man enters adulthood. He decides to enter the pedagogical college in Frunze, but doubts that he will pass the exams. To this, the director of the school Kazybek Abdykerimovich answers Cholponbai that he should not worry, since he was not a lagging student. Waking up early the next morning, Cholponbai goes to Tutkuch's stable, where he meets Gul'nara and greets her at the duval. But the girl is silent and leaves. On the same day, their second meeting takes place at the Kara-Bura River. Cholponbai helps the girl climb the wall of the stone fortress of Kyzyl-Orda, which overlooks the valley. There, holding hands, they spend time, but Gulnara remembers about her father's lunch and runs away. Cholponbai is sure that he does not want to marry her, "He likes Gulnara — and only".

=== Chapter 2. "Harsh time" ===
"On a clear June morning of the forty-first year, everything was as usual in the Telman village," Cholponbai and Ashimbek, together with other kolkhoz people, leave for the mountains for haymaking. They finish work late, everyone works without rest: "Not only people, but also horses were exhausted from the heat." The guys go to wait out the heat to the Kara-Bura River, and the postman Sagyn rushes past them, who informs everyone that Adolf Hitler is starting a war. On that day, Cholponbai's brother Tokosh goes to the front. Cholponbai has a vague idea about the war: he knows about it only from movies, from books he has read and from the stories of Tutkuch, as he "bullied" the Basmachi in the Chatkal valley. The postman Sagyn often brings news about the death of fellow villagers, about the seizure of towns and villages by fascists who "furiously rush deep into their native country". Meanwhile, Cholponbai goes to the house of Sharshen, Gul'nara's father. The girl shuns him, runs away into the house. The reason for this behavior was that Gul'nara, against her will, was married to a jigit from Kirovka. So she becomes the bride of her late sister's husband. Sagymbek insists that Cholponbai should convince Gulnara not to live according to the old customs.

Upon returning home, Cholponbai is waiting for joyful news — a letter from Tokosh arrives. He reports that some of them are heading to the city of Kalinin. "Don't worry about me, I'm not the only one, we'll go beat the fascists soon," the letter ends with these words. After a weight—lifting contest (Cholponbai lifts two and a half bags of wheat there — one hundred and fifty kilograms) and a competition for drinking kumis in thirty-three sips in one breath, Sagymbek searches for Cholponbai and reports that Gul'nara does not love her fiancé. The next evening, he goes to Gul'nara with the intention of persuading her father Sharshen. Cholponbai tells him that Gulnara should not marry an old man: "It's not fair, Sharshen-aka, to deprive a girl of her right to choose," tries to convince him not to follow outdated customs.

Autumn is coming. The Sovinformburo reports are broadcast. When the trees shed their yellow leaves, sad news comes to the Telman village: the fascists have approached Moscow. It is also reported that there are horsemen from Kyrgyzstan near Moscow, among whom there is Duishenkul Shopokov. They are commanded by the military commissar of the Kyrgyz Republic Ivan Panfilov. The news of the heroism of the heroes of the Volokolamsk highway inspired residents with hope, (Note: It is said about the battle on November 16, 1941 near Volokolamsk, at the Dubosekovo junction and the village of Nelidovo, which occurred between the second battalion of the 1075 regiment of the 316th Rifle Division under the command of Major General Ivan Panfilov and a column of German fascist tanks trying to break through to Moscow. As a result of the battle, the tanks were stopped, and the fascist occupiers were forced to turn and choose another direction for the breakthrough.) everyone is sure: "The uninvited aliens will flee through the snow-covered fields and forests of the Moscow region, as Napoleon's diverse army once ingloriously fled".

In the early November's morning, the postman Sagyn knocks at the Tuleberdievs' house and takes a triangular envelope from his hands at Dusk, where it is reported that her son Tokosh died a brave death near the village of Ashevsk in the Kalinin Oblast. After that, Cholponbai decides to go to the front, to avenge his brother. He goes to the military enlistment office and demands to be sent to the front. Although the young man was still a few months short of military age, his request was granted — Cholponbai becomes a Red Army soldier. At parting, Gulnara gives Cholponbai a pink handkerchief with the words: "I will wait. Take it".

=== Chapter 3. "The Don steppes on fire" ===
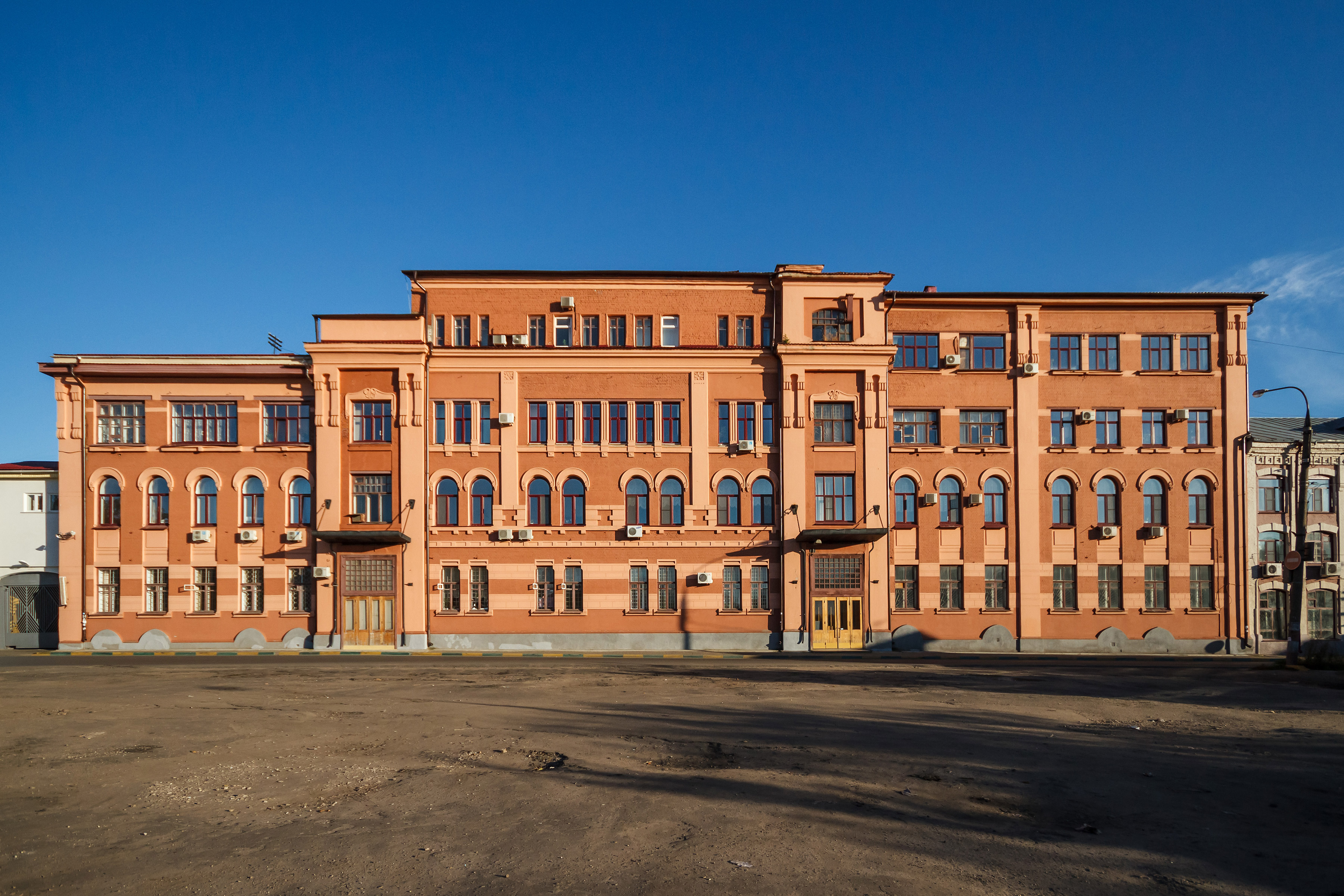
The main entrance of Krasnoye Sormovo Factory No. 112 in Nizhny Novgorod, Russia

After completing three-month courses, Cholponbai gets into a car with the inscription "Frunze—Moscow" on an April's morning. On the fifth day he finds himself in Saratov, and in the evening he sets off again. The journey takes two days, and on the third day there is a long stop at the steppe station. After the march on foot, the companies entered the village, and Cholponbai meets his regiment, which becomes his native. There he meets Ivan Antonov and learns about his family. His grandfather worked in Sormovskaya Sloboda for half a century, Ivan's father, Nikolai Petrovich, worked in Sormovo for many years. The Antonov family "defended Soviet power in the city with arms in their hands," after the Russian Civil War, his father worked permanently at a Krasnoye Sormovo Factory. He gives his only son to study as a locksmith, but he becomes a turner. Soon the war comes and Antonov becomes a Red Army soldier, gets into field camps, a regiment of workers from the city of Gorky is formed there, where Ivan is appointed commander of the department. After the fighting, the six hundred and thirty-sixth rifle regiment is withdrawn from the front line for re-formation and attached to the newly formed Voronezh Front. Ivan Antonov asks platoon commander Yakov Herman to give him Cholponbai to his squad. Then Cholponbai meets Sergo Metroveli, Gayfulla Gillyazitdinov, Vasily Petrov and others. The fighters begin to listen to the lectures of the company commander Gorokhov. However, as Cholponbai admits, he knows few Russian words, and Gillyazitdinov comes to his aid at the request of the commander. He claims that he will be able to explain everything to him, since the Tatar language is similar to Kyrgyz.

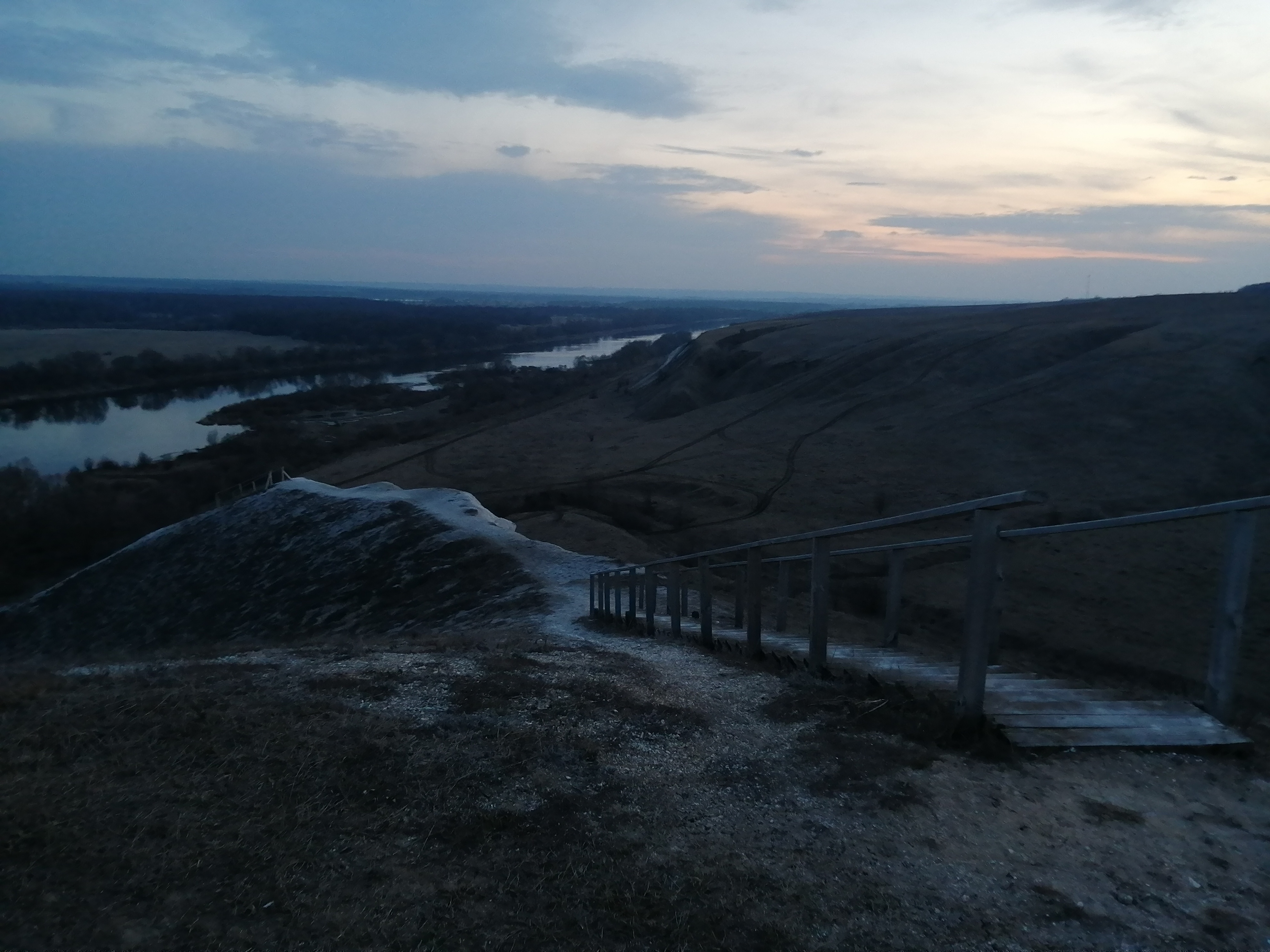
A staircase on the top of Lysaya Gora

Next, it tells about Cholponbai's combat training, his relationship with commanders and comrades, his taking the military oath, participation in the first battles on the Don, as well as how Cholponbai catches his "yazyk". (Note: A prisoner of war captured for the special purpose of obtaining information about the enemy.) The prisoner turns out to be a fascist, the commander of a machine-gun platoon. After such a walking reconnaissance, Cholponbai and his fighters are sent to horse reconnaissance. The mustachioed Cossack trained him for three days — taught him the rules of horse disguise, shooting from a machine gun at full gallop. Cholponbai crosses the Don on a trotter of the Russian Don breed and heads with the fighters to the Storozhevsky forest. They pass the Uryv-Pokrovka and jump in the direction of Ostrogozhsk — Korotoyak remains far away. The lookout informs them that he has met the fascists, and the fighters decide to leave, but Cholponbai jumps forward on a horse and with the help of cunning frees the way. Having visited Ostrogozhsk, Oskino, Repyevsk, the fighters see a lot and take note. On the tenth day, on the way from Repyevsk to Korotoyak, the cavalrymen stopped for a day in a deep ravine. Soon a fascist tank appears — Cholponbai "jumped up and threw a grenade right under the tracks with all his might." The car breaks down, and the lieutenant and a group of fighters decide to return: "The fascists will miss the tank, they will send soldiers — and then the horsemen will be in trouble." All returned from reconnaissance without losses, in full force.

Ahead is a day rest. Cholponbai receives a letter from Gul'nara — she reports that the village has become deserted, there are only old men, women and children. She asks Cholponbai to write more often, wants everyone in the village to know that she has such a friend at the front. Cholponbai never learns from the letter what happened between the girl and her fiancé after his departure. Cholponbai writes a reply letter, where he promises the girl that he will fight like Manas. A little later, Cholponbai is called to the Komsomol meeting, where he is accepted into the ranks of it. Battalion Commissar Major V. A. Muradyan arrives at the company's disposal and all the fighters assume that an offensive is being prepared. Muradyan draws a pencil along the front line of Stalingrad — Stavropol — Nalchik, and says that the fascists are rushing to the Volga: "Now our regiment faces a big task — to seize a bridgehead on the right bank of the Don and from there launch an offensive… In the morning, the ninth company set out on a campaign".

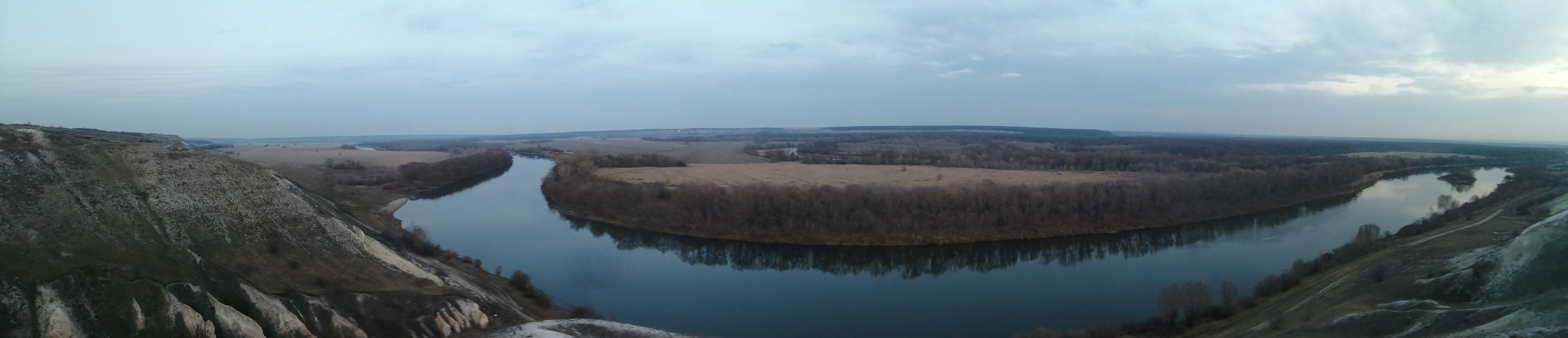
The approximate place of the feat of the Hero of the Soviet Union Cholponbai Tuleberdiev

"On the other side of the Don in the village of Selyavnoye, houses were burning, set on fire by artillery fire. Black smoke covered the cloudless sky...". At times, the Lysaya Gora on the other side was hidden from view. There were already trenches, bunkers, wire fences and fascists hiding in the ground on the mountain. During the two weeks that the company spends on vacation, the fascists strengthen themselves in the village and bring firing points closer to the shore, install two machine-gun points on the Lysaya Gora: the invaders sought to "cover the Chertov Yar, which began at the Don itself, circled the village of Selyavnoye in a semicircle and reached almost to the edge of the Storozhevsky forest." Gorokhov orders the destruction of the bunker on Lysaya Gora.

Next, it tells about the exploration of Arkhip Polikarpov on the other side of the Don, where the fascists are now: according to legend, he collects clothes from the dead. (Note: In the Frunze's edition of the 1958 novel, Arkhip Polikarpov is indeed a marauder and collects clothes from the dead. This image has been criticized. In the Moscow and subsequent editions of the novel, Arkhip becomes just a scout with such a "legend" in order to gain the trust of the fascists.) Passing the central square of Korotoyak, Arkhip gets to a quiet street, where he meets Denis Proskurin, a fellow soldier in the German war. He shows him a warehouse of German clothes, and the next morning Arkhip goes to the Storozhevoe. On the way Arkhip is caught by fascists. When asked who he is and where he came from, Arkhip instead of answering shows a tunic, trousers and a revolver from a handkerchief and says that he killed a Russian lieutenant: "They started chasing me, so I ran away to you. And I myself am a resident of the Novo-Zadonsky khutor." The chief lieutenant does not believe him, and calls the headman Blinkov. Arkhip recognizes him: he is from the village of Selyavnoye. Blinkov helps him escape from the fascists. Subsequently, the chief lieutenant gives him a piece of paper, which provides Arkhip with a way out of the situation. On his return, Polikarpov tells what he found out. Gorokhov decides to take Lysaya Gora and take possession of the Chertov Yar.

Preparation for the capture of the bridgehead took many days. "When the company was ready to start crossing" across the Don south of Selyavny, "a battle broke out in the Korotoyak area," which distracted the attention of the fascists. Meanwhile, Cholponbai and other fighters cross the river. Coming out of the water, Cholponbai immediately rushes to the mountain and climbs the cliff "with the agility of a climber": he had the experience gained in hiking in the Kara-Molo mountains to the Kyzyl-Adyr Tower with childhood friends. When all the soldiers got out, Gorokhov discovers a bunker. Fascists notice Soviet fighters: "The squad came under hurricane fire. It was impossible to move further." Cholponbai asks permission from Gorokhov to destroy the bunker and goes to him. He approaches the bunker and falls on the embrasure.

== Characters ==
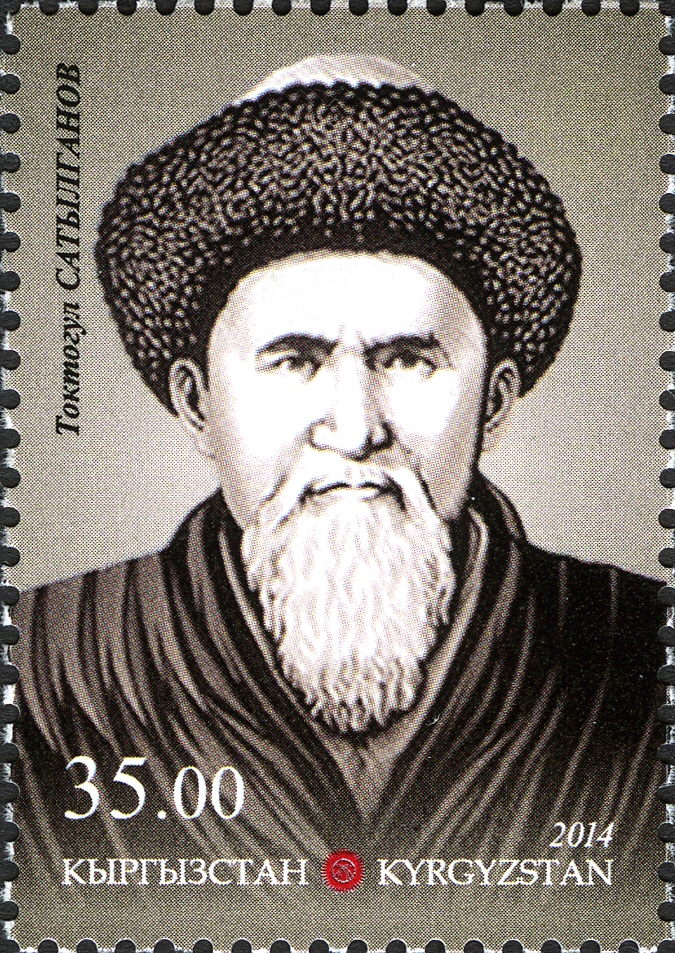
The main character in the story repeatedly refers to the poetry of Toktogul Satylganov

Cholponbai in the image of Fedor Samokhin is honest, strong-willed, he knows how to treat his elders with respect. The evolution of life views, the growth of self-awareness of the protagonist in the story unfold against the background of the overall picture of historical events when the Soviet people defended their freedom from the Nazi Germany. Fedor Samokhin, according to literary critic Tendik Askarov, reveals in Cholponbai "love for people and honesty." The author writes about the emotional experiences of the hero — Cholponbai, being in the Don steppes, walking along the bank of the Don, finds in them echoes of the Kara-Bura River, where he was born and grew up. Longing for his native land strengthens in him both hatred for violators of peaceful life and the desire to return home with a victory as soon as possible. Soon Cholponbai becomes a worthy fighter of his unit, he begins to be sent on important assignments, giving him confidence along with other soldiers. The story also draws attention to the fact that the poetry of Toktogul Satylganov seriously influenced the main character — he had a collection of poet's poems with him. Since childhood, the words have sunk into his soul: "The glory of the winged brave man lives after him for a year".

The literary critic drew attention to other characters in the story. He called the images of Surake and Duishembi successful and convincing. Surake in the image of Fedor Samokhin "a hardworking, loving mother". She endured all the hardships of life patiently, and this quality remained the main feature of the character. She didn't get emotional when she found out about the death of her son Tokosh. When Cholponbai announced that he was voluntarily going to the front, "she did not cry, did not faint," but only "clenched her teeth tighter" — she had a premonition that she was saying goodbye to him forever. According to Askarov, the author managed to create a "memorable image of the Kyrgyz mother".

The father of a friend of Cholponbai Duishembi teaches his son obsolete methods, beats him by a whip for bad marks. His temper, according to Tendik Askarov, resembles the image of Omor-ake from the story "Deti gor" by Tugolbay Sydykbekov — there is also a person who feels great power in the family, ready to make a scandal if someone encroaches on his beliefs. The methods of influencing people and educating them are the same, but they differ from each other in their views on life and the fact that Omor-ake adheres to his father's precepts, the traditions of antiquity, does not consider education "the work of real people." Duishembi is the exact opposite in this matter. He is convinced that only teaching will give a person happiness, but at the same time he goes to extremes, trying to instill his views on life by the power of whip. Askarov noted that this is the strengths and weaknesses of the image of Duishembi. In his opinion, the author managed to penetrate to some extent into the specifics of the national character, to find a characteristic detail for this, achieving great expressiveness. Duishembi, concerned about the departure of his son Sagymbek from home because of the offense inflicted on him, turns to his wife: "How long has he left? Duishembi asked his wife, who was raking out the ashes from the hearth." "The sun was shining through this window," she replied, looking anxiously at her husband." This insignificant touch, according to Askarov, contains a deep meaning. The words about the sun refer to the life of the Kyrgyz people, when people, "wise with the experience of folk astronomy," determined the seasons and days by the heavenly bodies. Elements of folk astronomy, some features of everyday phenomena continue their legitimate existence to this day. The author, as noted by the literary critic, correctly noticed this feature, and such "paint became, as it were, an expressive line against the background of monotonous tones".

In a truthful way, the critic called the episodic face of sergeant Potapov, but added that his image in the story is "convex" outlined. They say about him in the company: "Stingy as a petty officer Potapov." The lack of uniforms and bedding forced him to appear outwardly strict and stingy, but in fact he is a "warm-hearted" person who honestly treats his duties. He lives by the interests of the team, wants good for everyone and is ready to share with them "the first joy and well-being".

Along with the successful images in the novel, according to Tendik Askarov, there are also untruthful ones, since the writer did not follow the truth of life, he took the illusion of plausibility for the truth. As an example, the literary critic cited the scene where Cholponbai tries to argue with Gul'nara's father Sharshen and her groom. Here the characters say "unnatural, pompous words" and their actions are implausible. Cholponbai suddenly found himself in the role of a venerable old man, peppering his speech with aphoristic expressions, like — "Habit is a matter of everyday life, that's right, Sharshen—aka. However, many customs are outdated, as the lasso wears out. Some people grow old — gain wisdom, others cling in the frumpy way, like a burdock to a sheep's tail." Gulnara's fiancé is a "stupid" person who can only show his spiritual emptiness. Fedor Samokhin, noted Askarov, "put cynical words into the mouth of the groom" in order to cause the reader to feel "disgust and contempt," but, according to the literary critic, this way of portraying negative characters suffers from one-sidedness. Askarov doubted that "the groom, claiming the hand of a young girl, would demonstrate his mental squalor, animal selfishness." According to the critic, it would be more plausible to depict "the groom is not a simpleton, but a cunning wolf in sheep's clothing".

According to Tendik Askarov, the image of Arkhip Polikarpov also leaves a bad impression. His occupation is to collect things from corpses. When asked what he collects, Polikarpov replies that he takes everything from a greatcoat to a tunic. He justifies his actions by saying that the dead no longer need things: "And does it matter to the murdered person how to lie in the grave — naked or in a greatcoat? And I need things alive." The reader cannot indifferently read this "vile philosophy", which "is a mockery of the memory of fallen soldiers." But at the same time, Arkhip Polikarpov was trusted, and he was sent to the German-Fascist rear for reconnaissance. Once there, he shows himself to be a "surprisingly dexterous person", turns into a "cunning scout" and makes unhindered walks near the military facilities of the fascists. The consciousness of humanity awakens in Polikarpov's soul, and before the reader he is reborn into a decent person. "I was ashamed to live the way I used to, in my homeland..." he says. However, according to the literary critic, this sounds unconvincing and false, his rebirth is insufficiently motivated and "has no solid ground". Nevertheless, the author believes in the rebirth of his hero.

== Literary features ==
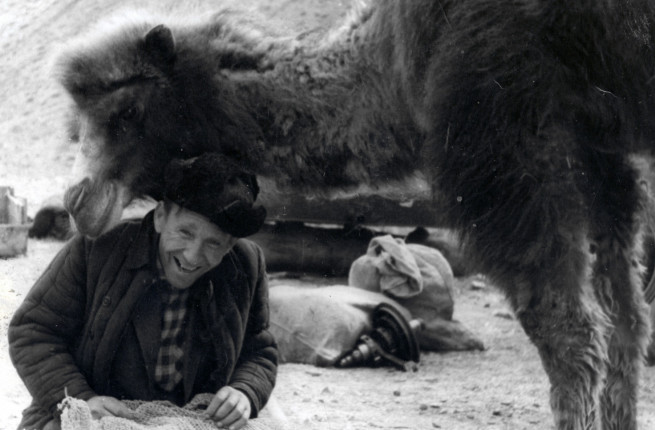
Fedor Samohin, author

Researcher O. I. Trudakova from the Zhukov Air and Space Defence Academy analyzed the language tools used by Fedor Samokhin to create the image of the Hero of the Soviet Union Cholponbai Tuleberdiev in order to determine the patterns of their use. The research of the story is based on the works of Kirov's linguists (S. V. Chernova, N. G. Naumova, A. N. Gluhikh). The main attention in the article is drawn to the description of the image of a person / character using dynamic and static ("procedural" and "non-procedural") characteristics. (Note: Procedural characteristics include goals, motives, ways of performing actions, communicative tactics, non-procedural — appearance, material objects, life values, character traits.) Trudakova comes to the conclusion that the main author's characteristic of the hero in the text of the story "Cholponbai" by F. Samokhin is the action itself, and not thinking about it. The characteristics of the main character are transmitted mostly with the help of verbs, verb forms and their accompanying adverbs. When describing the main character of the story, the writer most often uses nouns and adjectives with a positive and neutral assessment. Negative vocabulary in relation to the main character appears only in two places in other characters.

The main character owns things characteristic of a resident of a Kyrgyz village, in his canvas bag there are tortillas, boiled lamb meat. Through such objects, the motive of the road is introduced, and the narration acquires a parable manner. The article also highlights the main values of the hero, including family and friends, expressed in desires and actions both in peacetime and in wartime. He feels personally responsible to the country and his loved ones. All of the above forms the traits of his character — the hero has aspirations, hopes and moral guidelines. The hero's intentions, in which his future actions can be seen, are conveyed using verbs.

Among the static characteristics of the character in the story, Trudakova pays attention to his desire "to be with his comrades all the time, among people." "It's dreary to be alone", the hero says to his friend, the infantryman Ostap. "Cholponbai tried to walk next to the platoon leader — you feel calmer." "He has a kind heart. He will take off his shirt for a friend," Ostap characterizes Tuleberdiev. The researcher notes that a typical phenomenon for Soviet literature can be traced here — the lack of individualism in a positive hero. The lack of individualism helps to understand the "desperate act of a person" who sacrificed himself for others. As a result of the analysis of static characteristics, O. I. Rudakova discovers that the appearance of the main character is described using adjectives in degrees of comparison.

In the descriptions of Tuleberdiev's activity in the story, the author resorts to the past tense forms of perfect verbs (an element of dynamics). The text of the story repeatedly emphasizes the speed and strength of the actions carried out by the hero. Due to their timeliness, they are usually successful. The mental activity of the main character is most often described by the verbs "worried", "rejoiced", "guessed". The hero overcomes his excitement before each significant action. Cholponbai does not reflect on his actions and does not react to the actions of the other heroes.

It is noted that the author characterizes the hero mainly through action, and not through reflection. The hero speaks without emotion, evaluates his actions in rare cases. In his action, uncertainty and excitement fade into the background. Before the feat, he had "clear, clear thoughts in his head." The feat is evaluated only in the lyrical digressions and speeches of other characters. "Tuleberdiev died for his Homeland", "here a man gave his life so that hundreds of other fighters would remain alive", "what a golden heart this fighter had, <...> may the earth lie like swan's down on his grave" (Lieutenant Gorokhov). "For us, loyal friends, he did not spare his life" (company commander). "He died a brave death for the freedom and independence of our Motherland" (company foreman). "Tuleberdiev chest opened the way for us" (fighter Metroveli). The writer quotes the text from the wooden obelisk of the mass grave: "Eternal memory to you, hero of the Kyrgyz people! Faithful son of the Motherland, Cholponbai Tuleberdiev, you have immortalized yourself and your people! The memory of you will live forever!". In the author's speech, the assessment of the feat is expressed as follows: "The bright image of Cholponbai Tuleberdiev inspired soldiers to combat feats"; "the memory of Cholponbai Tuleberdiyev lives in the hearts of soldiers and officers".

The scale of the personality and the feat justify, according to the researcher, the idealization of the main character in the story. There are no contradictions in his character — desires and actions are directly connected, and the feat is an inevitable consequence of his moral and ethical foundations. According to O. I. Trudakova, the prevailing social morality at that time — when the interests of the collective were put above the interests of the individual — and the peculiarities of the worldview of front-line writers are reflected in the linguistic means that Fedor Samokhin used to describe a historical personality.

== History of publication ==
=== Publication history and significance ===
How did it happen that Samokhin's book was published in our publishing house ("Molodaya Gvardiya")? It very rarely happens that we write about the Komsomol members of Kyrgyzstan, Tajikistan, Georgia. We published books for the anniversary of the Komsomol. In this regard, we have addressed many republics with a written request to recommend publishing something from the history of the people. Comrade Abakirov answered us from Kyrgyzstan and advised us to publish this book.

— M. Danilova, editor of the Moscow's edition of the novel.

In February 1957, even before the publication of the story, the newspaper "Leninchil Zhash" published an excerpt of the story in Kyrgyz "Baatyr zhonundo", at the same time the excerpt was published in the newspaper "Komsomolets Kirghizii" in Russian. In 1958, the novel was published by the Kyrgyz State Publishing House and the "Molodaya Gvardiya", and soon became widely known in Kyrgyzstan. The release of the story was reported by the magazines "Novy Mir", "Moskva", as well as "Literaturnaya Gazeta", where the release of the novel was timed to coincide with the Decade of Kyrgyz Art and Literature in Moscow in 1958.

In 1965, the story was placed in the recommendation index of literature about the Eastern Front of World War II from the State Library of the USSR named after V. I. Lenin (now the Russian State Library) and the State Public Historical Library of Russia. In 1978, it excerpt was published in the newspaper "Sovetskaya Kirgiziya". In 1982, the novel was republished by the Kyrgyz State Educational and Pedagogical publishing house "Mektep", marked "for middle and high school age". In 1985, it excerpt was included in the collection "Ikh podvig budet zhit' v vekakh" edited by Doctor of Philosophy, corresponding member of the Kyrgyz Academy of Sciences A. K. Karypkulov and Candidate of Historical Sciences, corresponding member of the Academy of Sciences of the Kyrgyz SSR K. K. Orozaliev, as well as in the collection of short stories and poems by writers-veterans of Kyrgyzstan "Zveni, komuz!". In addition, the story was listed as a source about the feat of Ch. Tuleberdieva in the book of Doctor of Historical Sciences S. K. Kerimbaev "Sovetskiy Kirgizstan v Velikoy Otechestvennoy voyne 1941—1945 gg.", edited by Doctor of Historical Sciences and Professor Georgy Kumanev. In 2014, an excerpt of the story was included in a collection of documents and materials about Cholponbai Tuleberdiev entitled "Podvig ego bessmerten...", published by the Archival Agency at the State Registration Service under the Government of the Kyrgyz Republic. In 2019, the story was digitized by the Osh Regional Library named after T. Satylganov, and in 2020 it was included in the section with materials from the Ministry of Education and Science of Kyrgyzstan for schools of the republic. Located in the department of rare and especially valuable publications of the National Library of the Kyrgyz Republic.

=== Reviews from readers and critics ===
Literary critic Tendik Askarov generally praised the story and noted that Fedor Ivanovich Samokhin managed to create not a bare chronicle of Cholponbai's life, but a work of fiction, "where the author's fiction found its rightful place." The literary critic drew attention to the author's lack of intention to portray Cholponbai as an ideal hero, and this, in his opinion, "the story only wins and even more endears the reader." In his opinion, the author should be credited with the fact that in the story "the author's speech and the speech of the characters does not move in line with some phrases gleaned from newspapers with an admixture of Kyrgyz words," and noted that all this was achieved thanks to "the author's skillful use of all shades of speech expression, artistic means, finding the most correct connections between the components of the set goal".

Tendik Askarov noted that, having perceived the Kyrgyz people's colors, motives, poetics of speech, the writer tried to show some national peculiarities in mores, recreate the national flavor — in many places he uses proverbs and sayings of the Kyrgyz people, insert stories, which describe, for example, the arrival of poet Toktogul Satylganov. Thanks to this, according to the critic, "sometimes the author manages to find a characteristic detail that achieves great expressiveness in creating national specifics".

The author of the article in the magazine "Kommunist" N. Ivanov noted that the dignity of the story is "combat communist party membership". In his opinion, F. Samokhin, drawing the image of Cholponbai, "vividly shows his indissoluble connection with the working people", "selfless devotion to his socialist Homeland". At the same time, Ivanov criticized the story for the heavy language, the straightness of the plot, the poor colors of the description of nature, the weak outline of many images and the schematicity of enemies. Literary critic G. N. Khlypenko (from Kyrgyz State University) noted the manner of F. Samokhin in the story "heaped one "figurative" absurdity on another", which, in his opinion, was characteristic of the story "Dom moego ottsa", where he continued to "flaunt such "figurative" comparisons".

Poet Nikolai Imshenetskiy generally praised the story "Cholponbai" and noted that F. I. Samokhin proved that it was not Cholponbai Tuleberdiev who repeated the feat of Alexander Matrosov, but vice versa. Imshenetsky also noted what the writer went through to write a story based on historical facts: "For this I had to travel hundreds of kilometers, dig into archives, put a lot of energy and effort <...> F. Samokhin meets many interesting people — Cholponbai's relatives, friends, comrades, with all that amazing world that surrounded the hero of his future book." The poet concluded: "There is no need to talk about the strengths and weaknesses of the story again. It is read, it lives. And this is the main thing".

In the newspaper "Sovetskaya Kultura", the story "Cholponbai" by F. I. Samokhin was attributed to works that "adorn the multicolored carpet of Kyrgyz literature". Literary critic and translator V. Ya. Vakulenko attributed the story to those works where the Kyrgyz theme is not just a background, but the subject of "direct feelings and experiences of the author". The magazine "Literaturniy Kyrgyzstan" put the story on par with works that are "more widely and comprehensively developed in content, style and aesthetics". Literary critic and publicist Pamirbek Kazybaev wrote in 2022:

The writer Fedor Samokhin considered the image of the feat of the people of Soviet Kyrgyzstan in the Great Patriotic War to be the main theme of his work and did a great job. The greatest achievement is his story "Cholponbai", published in Frunze and at the same time in Moscow by the publishing house "Molodaya Gvardiya". The release of the book is a joint success of the hero of the book and the author himself.

Writer and publicist, candidate of Historical Sciences Vladimir Deev in 1981 in his book "Istoriya v obrazakh", comparing the story "Cholponbai" and the essay of the same name by Kasymaly Dzhantoshev, wrote that the most complete image of Cholponbai was created in the story by Fedor Samokhin. In his opinion, the author was able to reveal the origins of the heroism of the young Kyrgyz fighter: "In the story, you can find out that the hero's father died after working hard at bai's, that his older brother died at the hands of the Basmachi, the other in the battle of Moscow, and that Tuleberdiev's spiritual mentor was a Russian Civil War fighter Tutkuch." Deev noted: the writer focuses on the fact that among the soldiers of the regiment it was "an unwritten law to protect the honor of the working class, that the workers cemented the combat team and its discipline in the regiment." According to the historian, this author's concept is connected with the teachings of V. I. Lenin on the protection of the socialist Fatherland.

== Editions ==
Separate editions

- Samokhin, Fedor (1958). Zhazhiev, S. M. (ed.). Cholponbai. Frunze: Kyrgyz State Publishing House. p. 191.
- Samokhin, Fedor (1958). Danilova, M (ed.). Cholponbai. Moscow: Molodaya Gvardiya. p. 112.
- Samokhin, Fedor (1982). Ledenev, P. G; Boldyreva, N. M (eds.). Cholponbai (2 ed.). Frunze: Mektep. p. 125.

As part of collections

- Samokhin, Fedor (1978). Ivanov, A. I (ed.). Izbrannoe. Frunze: Publishing House "Kyrgyzstan". p. 251.
- Samokhin, Fedor (1988). Gorbacheva, R. V (ed.). Povesti i rasskazy. Frunze: Publishing House "Kyrgyzstan". p. 200. ISBN 5-655-00113-6.

== Influence ==
Doctor of Philology, corresponding member of the National Academy of Sciences of the Kyrgyz Republic Abdikadyr Sadykov discovered the influence of Fyodor Samokhin's story "Cholponbai" on the plot of the drama of the same name by Toktobolot Abdumomunov, written in 1985. According to the literary critic, the drama included the main events of the hero's life, as in F. Samokhin. For example, the story tells how Gulnara gives Cholponbai a handkerchief with a letter as a symbol of her love for him — there is a similar thing in the drama. The literary critic also noted the similarity of the names of the Cholponbai girl — in Samokhin's story her name is Gul'nara, and in Abdumomunov's drama she is Gul'zhar.

== Continuation of the theme in other works of the author ==
In the works of Fedor Samokhin, the story "Cholponbai" is not the only work describing the life and feat of Cholponbai Tuleberdiev. He continued the same theme in his collection of short stories "Geroi iz Talasa" (1966), which was published by the Publishing House of Political Literature. In Kyrgyz he wrote an essay "Talastyk baatyr", which in 1967 was published in the artistic and socio-political Kyrgyz magazine "Ala-Too". In 2007, his excerpt was included in the collection of documents and works about Ch. Tuleberdieva from the historian and Manas scholar Ch. T. Subakozhoeva.

His other essay on the feat of Ch. Tuleberdiev's "Krov'yu serdttsa" was published in the collection of works by Soviet Kyrgyz writers "Geroi surovikh let" in 1968, and in the second edition of the same collection in 1975. The essay was included in the collection "Molodye geroi Velikoi Otechestvennoi voiny", published in the series "ZHZL", compiled by the Belarusian writer Vasil Bykov. In the preface to the collection, Bykov attributed Fedor Samokhin's essay to works "in which everything is not equal", but they are "strong first of all with their genuine sincerity, the desire to convey to posterity the courageous and bright features of young heroes". In 1971, an excerpt of the essay was published in the magazine "Smena". David Ortenberg included the essay in the anthology "In the Name of the Motherland" from the Publishing House of Political Literature in 1968 and in the second edition of the same anthology in 1982.

== Sources ==
- Ivanov, N (October 1, 1958). "The novel of Cholponbai's Immortal Feat". Kommunist: 59–63.
- Askarov, Tendik (November 14, 1958). "The novel of the hero (About the story "Cholponbai" by F. I. Samokhin)". Komsomolets Kirgizii.
- Imshenetskiy, Nikolay (February 1, 1968). "Writer and time". Komsomolets Kirgizii.
- Deev, Vladimir (1981). History in Images: Reflection in Kyrgyz Fiction of the History of Kyrgyzstan during the Great Patriotic War. Frunze: Publishing House "Kyrgyzstan". p. 174.
- Samokhin, Fedor (1982). Ledenev, P. G; Boldyreva, N. M (eds.). Cholponbai (2 ed.). Frunze: Mektep. p. 125.
- Trudakova, O. I (2021). Language tools for creating images of Cholponbai Tuleberdiev in the story of Fedor Samokhin. Tver: Zhukov Air and Space Defence Academy. pp. 232–236. ISBN 978-5-6045206-4-2.

== Links ==
The novel "Cholponbai" by F. Samokhin as part of the collection "Izbrannoe" (1978) in the British Library and the Harvard Library.
