= Buzenki =

Buzenki Бузенки
- Khutor
- Location within Voronezh Oblast Location within Russia
- Coordinates: 51°12′N 38°56′E
- Country: Russia
- Region: Voronezh Oblast
- District: Ostrogozhsky District
- Time zone: UTC+3:00

Buzenki (Russian: Бузенки) is a rural locality (a khutor) in Mastyuginskoye Rural Settlement, Ostrogozhsky District, Voronezh Oblast, Russia. The population was 146 as of 2010. There are 3 streets.

== Geography ==
Buzenki is located 55 km north of Ostrogozhsk (the district's administrative centre) by road. Rossoshki is the nearest rural locality.
