= Khokhol-Trostyanka =

Khokhol-Trostyanka Хохол-Тростянка
- Selo
- Location within Voronezh Oblast Location within Russia
- Coordinates: 50°47′N 38°46′E
- Country: Russia
- Region: Voronezh Oblast
- District: Ostrogozhsky District
- Time zone: UTC+3:00

Khokhol-Trostyanka (Russian: Хохол-Тростянка) is a rural locality (a selo) and the administrative center of Khokhol-Trostyanskoye Rural Settlement, Ostrogozhsky District, Voronezh Oblast, Russia. The population was 652 as of 2010. There are 7 streets.

== Geography ==
Khokhol-Trostyanka is located 27 km southwest of Ostrogozhsk (the district's administrative centre) by road. Repenka is the nearest rural locality.
