= Ternovoye, Ostrogozhsky District, Voronezh Oblast =

Ternovoye Терновое
- Selo
- Location within Voronezh Oblast Location within Russia
- Coordinates: 50°58′N 38°58′E
- Country: Russia
- Region: Voronezh Oblast
- District: Ostrogozhsky District
- Time zone: UTC+3:00

Ternovoye (Russian: Терновое) is a rural locality (a selo) and the administrative center of Ternovskoye Rural Settlement, Ostrogozhsky District, Voronezh Oblast, Russia. The population was 704 as of 2010. There are 5 streets.

== Geography ==
Ternovoye is located 18 km northwest of Ostrogozhsk (the district's administrative centre) by road. Beryozovo is the nearest rural locality.
