= Petrenkovo =

Petrenkovo Петренково
- Selo
- Location within Voronezh Oblast Location within Russia
- Coordinates: 50°47′N 39°07′E
- Country: Russia
- Region: Voronezh Oblast
- District: Ostrogozhsky District
- Time zone: UTC+3:00

Petrenkovo (Russian: Петренково) is a rural locality (a selo) and the administrative center of Petrenkovskoye Rural Settlement, Ostrogozhsky District, Voronezh Oblast, Russia. The population was 543 as of 2010. There are 5 streets.

== Geography ==
Petrenkovo is located 11 km southeast of Ostrogozhsk (the district's administrative centre) by road. Pakholok is the nearest rural locality.
