= Beryozovo, Ostrogozhsky District, Voronezh Oblast =

Beryozovo Берёзово
- Selo
- Location within Voronezh Oblast Location within Russia
- Coordinates: 50°56′N 38°54′E
- Country: Russia
- Region: Voronezh Oblast
- District: Ostrogozhsky District
- Time zone: UTC+3:00

Beryozovo (Russian: Берёзово) is a rural locality (a selo) and the administrative center of Beryozovskoye Rural Settlement, Ostrogozhsky District, Voronezh Oblast, Russia. The population was 488 as of 2010. There are 14 streets.

== Geography ==
Beryozovo is located 24 km northwest of Ostrogozhsk (the district's administrative centre) by road. Ternovoye is the nearest rural locality.
