= Mastyugino =

Mastyugino Мастюгино
- Selo
- Location within Voronezh Oblast Location within Russia
- Coordinates: 51°11′N 39°02′E
- Country: Russia
- Region: Voronezh Oblast
- District: Ostrogozhsky District
- Time zone: UTC+3:00

Mastyugino (Russian: Мастю́гино) is a rural locality (a selo) and the administrative center of Mastyuginskoye Rural Settlement, Ostrogozhsky District, Voronezh Oblast, Russia. The population was 657 as of 2010. There are 6 streets.

== Geography ==
Mastyugino is located 47 km north of Ostrogozhsk (the district's administrative centre) by road. Novo-Uspenka is the nearest rural locality.
