= Rastykaylovka =

Rastykaylovka Растыкайловка
- Khutor
- Location within Voronezh Oblast Location within Russia
- Coordinates: 50°39′N 39°09′E
- Country: Russia
- Region: Voronezh Oblast
- District: Ostrogozhsky District
- Time zone: UTC+3:00

Rastykaylovka (Russian: Растыкайловка) is a rural locality (a khutor) in Krivopolyanskoye Rural Settlement, Ostrogozhsky District, Voronezh Oblast, Russia. The population was 131 as of 2010. There are three streets.

== Geography ==
Rastykaylovka is located 29 km south of Ostrogozhsk (the district's administrative centre) by road. Krivaya Polyana is the nearest rural locality.
