= Novaya Osinovka =

Novaya Osinovka Новая Осиновка
- Selo
- Location within Voronezh Oblast Location within Russia
- Coordinates: 50°47′N 38°56′E
- Country: Russia
- Region: Voronezh Oblast
- District: Ostrogozhsky District
- Time zone: UTC+3:00

Novaya Osinovka (Russian: Новая Осиновка) is a rural locality (a selo) in Veretyevskoye Rural Settlement, Ostrogozhsky District, Voronezh Oblast, Russia. The population was 457 as of 2010. There are 4 streets.

== Geography ==
Novaya Osinovka is located 14 km southwest of Ostrogozhsk (the district's administrative centre) by road. Nizhny Olshan is the nearest rural locality.
