= Novo-Uspenka =

Novo-Uspenka Ново-Успенка
- Khutor
- Location within Voronezh Oblast Location within Russia
- Coordinates: 51°10′N 39°05′E
- Country: Russia
- Region: Voronezh Oblast
- District: Ostrogozhsky District
- Time zone: UTC+3:00

Novo-Uspenka (Russian: Ново-Успенка) is a rural locality (a khutor) in Uryvskoye Rural Settlement, Ostrogozhsky District, Voronezh Oblast, Russia. The population was 297 as of 2010. There are 2 streets.

== Geography ==
Novo-Uspenka is located 41 km north of Ostrogozhsk (the district's administrative centre) by road. Mastyugino is the nearest rural locality.
