= Kolovatovka =

Kolovatovka Коловатовка
- Village
- Location within Voronezh Oblast Location within Russia
- Coordinates: 50°44′N 38°52′E
- Country: Russia
- Region: Voronezh Oblast
- District: Ostrogozhsky District
- Time zone: UTC+3:00

Kolovatovka (Russian: Коловатовка) is a rural locality (a village) in Olshanskoye Rural Settlement, Ostrogozhsky District, Voronezh Oblast, Russia. The population was 78 as of 2010.

== Geography ==
Kolovatovka is located 21 km southwest of Ostrogozhsk (the district's administrative centre) by road. Nizhny Olshan is the nearest rural locality.
