= Nizhny Olshan =

Nizhny Olshan Нижний Ольшан
- Selo
- Location within Voronezh Oblast Location within Russia
- Coordinates: 50°45′N 38°55′E
- Country: Russia
- Region: Voronezh Oblast
- District: Ostrogozhsky District
- Time zone: UTC+3:00

Nizhny Olshan (Russian: Нижний Ольшан) is a rural locality (a selo) and the administrative center of Olshanskoye Rural Settlement, Ostrogozhsky District, Voronezh Oblast, Russia. The population was 884 as of 2010. There are 12 streets.

== Geography ==
Nizhny Olshan is located 23 km southwest of Ostrogozhsk (the district's administrative centre) by road. Veretye is the nearest rural locality.
