= Shubnoye =

Shubnoye Шубное
- Selo
- Location within Voronezh Oblast Location within Russia
- Coordinates: 50°51′N 38°51′E
- Country: Russia
- Region: Voronezh Oblast
- District: Ostrogozhsky District
- Time zone: UTC+3:00

Shubnoye (Russian: Шубное) is a rural locality (a selo) and the administrative center of Shubinskoye Rural Settlement, Ostrogozhsky District, Voronezh Oblast, Russia. The population was 1,061 as of 2010. There are 15 streets.

== Geography ==
Shubnoye is located 17 km west of Ostrogozhsk (the district's administrative centre) by road. Gubarevka is the nearest rural locality.
