= Blizhneye Stoyanovo =

Blizhneye Stoyanovo Ближнее Стояново
- Khutor
- Location within Voronezh Oblast Location within Russia
- Coordinates: 50°48′N 39°05′E
- Country: Russia
- Region: Voronezh Oblast
- District: Ostrogozhsky District
- Time zone: UTC+3:00

Blizhneye Stoyanovo (Russian: Ближнее Стояново) is a rural locality (a khutor) in Gnilovskoye Rural Settlement, Ostrogozhsky District, Voronezh Oblast, Russia. The population was 580 as of 2010. There are 9 streets.

== Geography ==
Blizhneye Stoyanovo is located 8 km south of Ostrogozhsk (the district's administrative centre) by road. Gniloye is the nearest rural locality.
