= Veretye, Voronezh Oblast =

Veretye Веретье
- Selo
- Location within Voronezh Oblast Location within Russia
- Coordinates: 50°46′N 38°52′E
- Country: Russia
- Region: Voronezh Oblast
- District: Ostrogozhsky District
- Time zone: UTC+3:00

Veretye (Russian: Веретье) is a rural locality (a selo) and the administrative center of Veretyevskoye Rural Settlement, Ostrogozhsky District, Voronezh Oblast, Russia. The population was 704 as of 2010. There are 15 streets.

== Geography ==
Veretye is located 19 km southwest of Ostrogozhsk (the district's administrative centre) by road. Nizhny Olshan is the nearest rural locality.
