= Dolzhik =

Dolzhik Должик
- Khutor
- Location within Voronezh Oblast Location within Russia
- Coordinates: 50°49′N 39°12′E
- Country: Russia
- Region: Voronezh Oblast
- District: Ostrogozhsky District
- Time zone: UTC+3:00

Dolzhik (Russian: Должик) is a rural locality (a khutor) in Krinichenskoye Rural Settlement, Ostrogozhsky District, Voronezh Oblast, Russia. The population was 350 as of 2010. There are 11 streets.

== Geography ==
Dolzhik is located 12 km southeast of Ostrogozhsk (the district's administrative centre) by road. Litvinovka is the nearest rural locality.
