= Trud, Voronezh Oblast =

Trud Труд
- Settlement
- Location within Voronezh Oblast Location within Russia
- Coordinates: 50°56′N 39°00′E
- Country: Russia
- Region: Voronezh Oblast
- District: Ostrogozhsky District
- Time zone: UTC+3:00

Trud (Russian: Труд) is a rural locality (a settlement) in Ostrogozhsk, Ostrogozhsky District, Voronezh Oblast, Russia. The population was 61 as of 2010. There are four streets.

== Geography ==
Trud is located 12 km northwest of Ostrogozhsk (the district's administrative centre) by road. Ternovoye is the nearest rural locality.
