= Peski-Kharkovskiye =

Peski-Kharkovskiye Пески-Харьковские
- Settlement
- Location within Voronezh Oblast Location within Russia
- Coordinates: 50°56′N 39°16′E
- Country: Russia
- Region: Voronezh Oblast
- District: Ostrogozhsky District
- Time zone: UTC+3:00

Peski-Kharkovskiye (Russian: Пески-Харьковские) is a rural locality (a settlement) in Krinichenskoye Rural Settlement, Ostrogozhsky District, Voronezh Oblast, Russia. The population was 92 as of 2010. There are 4 streets.

== Geography ==
Peski-Kharkovskiye is located 29 km northeast of Ostrogozhsk (the district's administrative centre) by road. Luki is the nearest rural locality.
