= Russkaya Trostyanka =

Russkaya Trostyanka Русская Тростянка
- Selo
- Location within Voronezh Oblast Location within Russia
- Coordinates: 50°52′N 38°45′E
- Country: Russia
- Region: Voronezh Oblast
- District: Ostrogozhsky District
- Time zone: UTC+3:00

Russkaya Trostyanka (Russian: Русская Тростянка) is a rural locality (a selo) in Shubinskoye Rural Settlement, Ostrogozhsky District, Voronezh Oblast, Russia. The population was 405 as of 2010. There are 7 streets.

== Geography ==
Russkaya Trostyanka is located 27 km west of Ostrogozhsk (the district's administrative centre) by road. Strelitsa is the nearest rural locality.
