= Elevatorny =

Elevatorny Элеваторный
- Settlement
- Location within Voronezh Oblast Location within Russia
- Coordinates: 50°49′N 39°05′E
- Country: Russia
- Region: Voronezh Oblast
- District: Ostrogozhsky District
- Time zone: UTC+3:00

Elevatorny (Russian: Элеваторный) is a rural locality (a settlement) in Gnilovskoye Rural Settlement, Ostrogozhsky District, Voronezh Oblast, Russia. The population was 477 as of 2010. There are three streets.

== Geography ==
Elevatorny is located 5 km southeast of Ostrogozhsk (the district's administrative centre) by road. 3-go otdeleniya sovkhoza Pobeda is the nearest rural locality.
