= Yablochny, Voronezh Oblast =

Yablochny Яблочный
- Khutor
- Location within Voronezh Oblast Location within Russia
- Coordinates: 51°09′N 38°59′E
- Country: Russia
- Region: Voronezh Oblast
- District: Ostrogozhsky District
- Time zone: UTC+3:00

Yablochny (Russian: Яблочный) is a rural locality (a khutor) in Boldyrevskoye Rural Settlement, Ostrogozhsky District, Voronezh Oblast, Russia. The population was 50 as of 2010. There are 2 streets.

== Geography ==
Yablochny is located 39 km north of Ostrogozhsk (the district's administrative centre) by road. Boldyrevka is the nearest rural locality.
