= Blizhnyaya Polubyanka =

Blizhnyaya Polubyanka Ближняя Полубянка
- Selo
- Location within Voronezh Oblast Location within Russia
- Coordinates: 50°44′N 39°11′E
- Country: Russia
- Region: Voronezh Oblast
- District: Ostrogozhsky District
- Time zone: UTC+3:00

Blizhnyaya Polubyanka (Russian: Ближняя Полубянка) is a rural locality (a selo) in Petrenkovskoye Rural Settlement, Ostrogozhsky District, Voronezh Oblast, Russia. The population was 385 as of 2010. There are 4 streets.

== Geography ==
Blizhnyaya Polubyanka is located 17 km southeast of Ostrogozhsk (the district's administrative centre) by road. Yarki is the nearest rural locality.
