= Gniloye =

Gniloye Гнилое
- Selo
- Location within Voronezh Oblast Location within Russia
- Coordinates: 50°48′N 39°04′E
- Country: Russia
- Region: Voronezh Oblast
- District: Ostrogozhsky District
- Time zone: UTC+3:00

Gniloye (Russian: Гнилое) is a rural locality (a selo) and the administrative center of Gnilovskoye Rural Settlement, Ostrogozhsky District, Voronezh Oblast, Russia. The population was 1,028 as of 2010. There are 18 streets.

== Geography ==
Gniloye is located 10 km south of Ostrogozhsk (the district's administrative centre) by road. Blizhneye Stoyanovo is the nearest rural locality.
