= Krivaya Polyana =

Krivaya Polyana Кривая Поляна
- Selo
- Location within Voronezh Oblast Location within Russia
- Coordinates: 50°38′N 39°08′E
- Country: Russia
- Region: Voronezh Oblast
- District: Ostrogozhsky District
- Time zone: UTC+3:00

Krivaya Polyana (Russian: Кривая Поляна) is a rural locality (a selo) and the administrative center of Krivopolyanskoye Rural Settlement, Ostrogozhsky District, Voronezh Oblast, Russia. The population was 330 as of 2010. There are 10 streets.

== Geography ==
Krivaya Polyana is located 32 km south of Ostrogozhsk (the district's administrative centre) by road. Rastykaylovka is the nearest rural locality.
