= Ostrogozhsky =

Ostrogozhsky (masculine), Ostrogozhskaya (feminine), or Ostrogozhskoye (neuter) may refer to:

- Ostrogozhsky District, a district of Voronezh Oblast, Russia
- Ostrogozhskoye, a rural locality (a settlement) in Kaliningrad Oblast, Russia
