= Fedor Samokhin =

Soviet-Russian novelist

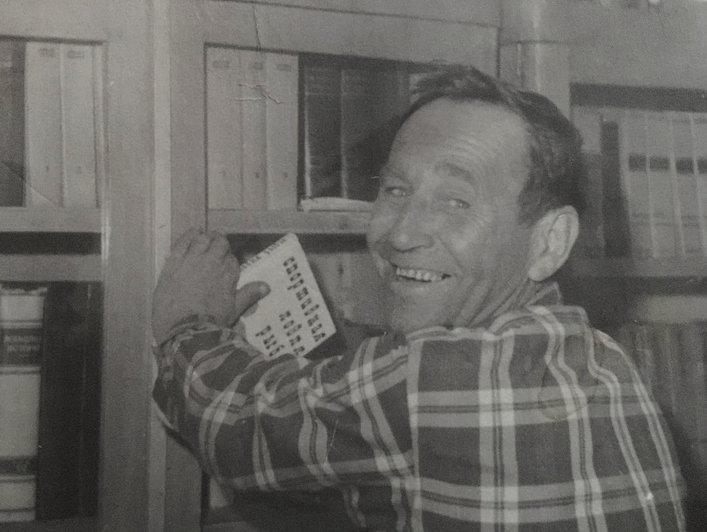
- In February 1968
- Born: Fedor Ivanovich Samokhin; 12 February 1918; Second Don District, Don Host Oblast, Russian Soviet Republic
- Died: 17 July 1992 (aged 74); Bishkek, Kyrgyzstan
- Education: Kyrgyz National University
- Occupations: writer; journalist; translator
- Spouse: Raisa Ilyinichna Samokhina (m. 1947)
- Children: Victoria; Vladimir; Aleksey
- Writing career
- Language: Russian, Kyrgyz
- Years active: 1949—1992
- Genres: Novel; short story
- Literary movement: Realism

Fedor Ivanovich Samokhin (Russian: Фёдор Иванович Самохин; 12 February 1918 – 17 July 1992) was a Soviet-Kyrgyz writer of prose, journalist and translator, member of the Union of writers of the USSR (since 1958). One of the founders of lieutenant and village prose in Kyrgyz literature.

His first book, The Boy from Stalingrad (Mal'chik iz Stalingrada, 1954), about the meeting in Kyrgyzstan and Kazakhstan of the evacuated population from the western regions of the Soviet Union during the Eastern Front, was awarded the First degree Prize of the Central Committee of the Komsomol and the Union of Writers of Kyrgyzstan, however it later received criticism in the press of the Kyrgyz SSR because of her "ideological depravity". His landmark book Cholponbai (1958) about the life of the Hero of the Soviet Union Cholponbai Tuleberdiev, published in the Kyrgyz State Publishing House and the Molodaya Gvardiya, is considered by researchers to be examples of the battle genre in Kyrgyz literature; revised into a sketch Krov'yu serdtsa (Bleeding Heart), it was included in the collection Young Heroes of the Great Patriotic War (Molodye geroi Velikoy Otechestvennoy voyny, 1970), published in the series The Lives of Remarkable People. His last work on military subjects and in his work as a whole was the novel Homeland, I'll Be Back! (Rodina, ya vernus'!) (1975), which tells how Soviet schoolchildren kidnapped by the Nazis are looking for a way to leave Germany to return home.

== Life ==
=== Early years. The Eastern Front ===
Fedor Samokhin was born on khutor of Verkhne-Sadovsky of the Don Host Oblast of the Russian Soviet Federative Socialist Republic in the family of a poor peasant. In 1940, he graduated from the Nizhne-Chirskaya secondary school. He began his career in 1934 as an accountant at his native khutor, from 1940 to 1942 he worked as a senior accountant at the Nizhne-Chirsky fish point.

After the outbreak of the Eastern Front, on the instructions of the Stalingrad obkom Komsomol from 1942 to 1943, he was a member of the bureau of the Nizhne-Chirsky underground Komsomol district committee, became an intelligence agent for the partisan detachment "Smertʹ fashyzmu!". Samokhin outlined his memories of the work of the detachment in the story The Intelligence Agent Claudia Panchishkina (1952), and his letter, later published in the magazine Molodaya Gvardiya in 1982, became the only surviving, according to historian Ivan Kandaurov, archival document about the work of the detachment in September 1942.

His work in the detachment was reflected in Ivan Kandaurov's documentary stories Stoĭkostʹ (1983) and Inache oni ne mogli (1986). In them, Fedor Samokhin is characterized as a rural correspondent who is actively involved in the public life of the district. After the onset of the war, he did not follow his relatives across the Volga, but began to lead a hidden life. Soon, the head of the detachment, Claudia Panchishkina, proposed to include him in the detachment.

In addition to intelligence work, he also participated in combat operations. To implement one of these, the head suggested creating several groups. The task of the group, which included Fedor Ivanovich, was to disable the steam mill and destroy grain warehouses on the left bank of the Don. Samokhin with comrade blew up a mill that provided bread to the Nazis: for three days they drove bags of burnt wheat to the mill, pretending to stand in line, and on the fourth they began to act. Catching the moment when the engine room became empty, they planted an anti-tank mine. The next day, the Nazis rolled barrels of fuel oil into the mill, after which the mine went off. The arson of warehouses on the banks of the Don took less time: after waiting for the only food guard to fall asleep, he and comrade set fire to the walls and doors doused with gasoline, after which they headed for the river.

Later, Panchishkina instructed him to send signals with a rocket launcher for Soviet Air Forces flying over the village towards Nazi targets. In the first half of November 1942, Claudia Panchishkina and Tamara Artemova were betrayed and shot by the Nazis — realizing that they would soon be discovered, they warned the rest of the underground in advance, thanks to which Samokhin was able to escape.

=== After the war. Moving to Kyrgyzstan ===
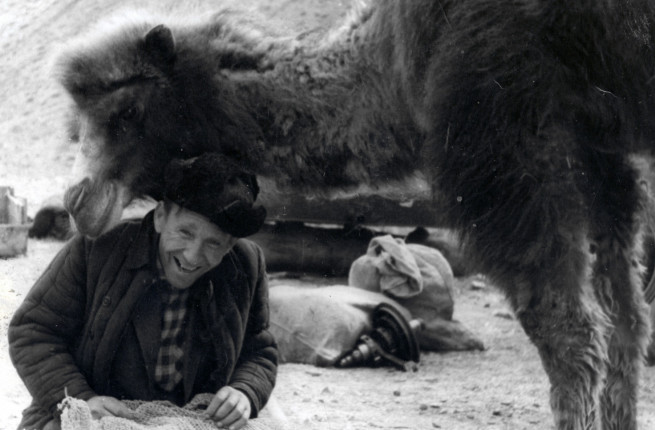
In the 1960s

After the liberation of the Nizhne-Chirsky district from occupation, Samokhin was appointed editor of the regional newspaper Kolkhoznik Dona - his first stories Na perekate, Garmon, Provody and others were also published there. In 1944, he attended a course for newspaper workers in Moscow; in the same year he became a member of the CPSU(b). Since 1945, he was a correspondent for Komsomolskaya Pravda, and a year later a literary employee, head of the department of the Leninskaya Smena newspaper in Almaty. From 1947 to 1949 he was a special correspondent for the newspaper Kommunist (Jambyl Region).

In 1947, he married Samokhina (Koroneva) Raisa Ilyinichna. In 1949 he moved to Frunze. In 1950 he entered the Kyrgyz State Pedagogical Institute, from which he graduated in 1955. From 1949 to 1961 he was a literary staff member, head of the editorial department of the newspaper Komsomolets Kirghizii; from 1961, for two years, he was a literary staff member in the editorial office of the magazine Bloknot Agitatora.

He did not have both legs and he moved on prosthetics — but he traveled a lot around Kyrgyzstan, got acquainted with the life and everyday life of Susamyr livestock breeders, builders of the Toktogul Dam, oil workers from Izbaskent, cotton growers of Aravan, hydrologists of Orto-Tokoy and fishermen of Issyk-Kul, the miners of Kyzyl-Kyya and the beet growers of the Kemin Valley, who later became the heroes of his works such as the stories My Father's House (Dom moyego ottsa), Three Islands (Tri ostrova) and Chui's Spills (Chuiskiye razlivy).

The Samokhin family has three children — a daughter and two sons. Daughter Victoria died of a serious illness, son Vladimir died tragically in 1969 in the Tien Shan. The second son, Alexey, settled in the Russian Far East.

In 1992, after a long illness, Fedor Samokhin died in Bishkek. After the writer's death, the editorial board of the Literary Kyrgyzstan magazine, the Association of Russian and Russian-speaking writers of the Union of Writers of Kyrgyzstan noted that "both Russian and Kyrgyz readers are proud of him as their countryman" and he "will forever remain a bright memory in the hearts of his readers and colleagues in pen".

== Legacy ==
=== Critical perception of the Soviet period ===
With the arrival in the literary space of the Kyrgyz SSR, the "writer of the Don expanses" (as Samokhin was later called in the Literaturnaya Gazeta), was met favorably: writer Shukurbek Beyshenaliev described him as "a gifted author of fiction writings <...> diligently, lovingly engaged in literary work". The novelist Nikolai Udalov believed that despite the shortcomings of his works, they have "certain artistic merits", help "to recognize some aspects of our lives" and, as the poet Sooronbai Dzhusuyev later noted, forcing readers to appreciate peaceful life. The novelist and playwright Mikhail Aksakov noted his constant creative search, the desire to find different artistic solutions. Writer Nikolai Chekmenev said:

It is quite good that Samokhin, before taking up a large canvas, worked for many years in a newspaper, where he printed short stories. This accustomed him to simplicity, clarity and brevity of the syllable, to thoughtful work on the language.

According to the former President of the Kyrgyzstan Writers Union Tendik Askarov, Samokhin's works are considered an "inseparable part of the literary process in the republic".

In the encyclopedia by the Academy of Sciences of the Kyrgyz SSR "Frunze" Abdygany Erkebaev attributed F. I. Samokhin to Russian writers who played "a significant role in the literary life of the republic and its capital".

=== Reviews of contemporaries. Memory ===
According to philologists G. N. Khlypenko, R. D. Bulatova (from the Kyrgyz-Russian Slavic University) and C. A. Dzholbulakova (from the Kyrgyz Technical University), F. I. Samokhin was among the creators of lieutenant and village prose in Kyrgyzstan. Ph.D. in Philology Almazbek Alymkulov considers Samokhin to be representatives of realism, and his works to be examples of the battle genre in Kyrgyz literature, which made a "great contribution" to this literary direction. At the same time, Alymkulov noted his "multifaceted, complex and contradictory" depiction of the heroism of his characters, their similarity in this regard to the images recreated by Mikhail Sholokhov, Alexander Bek, Vasily Grossman, Konstantin Simonov, Ilya Ehrenburg and others.

Associate professor of the Department of Theory and History of Russian and Foreign Literature of the Kyrgyz National University D. T. Burzhubaeva ranked Fedor Samokhin among the "talented" writers who sought to capture the versatility of life. Literary critic Papan Duyshonbaev considers him the author of "calendar prose", that is, works mainly based on the political and public agenda. Duyshonbaev believes that in Samokhin's prose there are "typical" images of workers, peasants, intellectuals, mainly the topics of the population transfer, collectivization, the creation of sovkhoz, industrialization and land development are raised.

In 2021, the National Library of the Kyrgyz Republic hosted an exhibition of his books "Skazat' lyudyam pravdu!" ("To Tell People the Truth!") dedicated to the 103rd anniversary of the writer's birth.

== As Translator ==
In 1968, he translated from Kyrgyz into Russian articles by Kasymaly Bayalinov "Nezabyvaemoe" and Zhoomart Bokonbaev "Velikiy pisatel' proletariata", telling about the meeting of Kyrgyz writers with Maxim Gorky during the First Congress of Soviet Writers. His translations were included in the collection "Dumy o Gorkom", which in 2021 was included in the eighth volume of the memoir heritage of the post-war period of the history of the USSR from the project of the Russian State Library and the State Public Historical Library of Russia "Sovetskoye obshchestvo v vospominaniyakh i dnevnikakh". In 1985, he took part in the translation and publication of a collection of works by Kyrgyz front-line writers “Zveni, komuz!”.

== Works ==
=== Novels ===
- The Intelligence Agent Claudia Panchishkina (Razvedchitsa Klavdiya Panchishkina, 1952)
- The Boy from Stalingrad (Mal'chik iz Stalingrada, 1954)
- Cholponbai ("Kyrgyz State Publishing House", 1958)
- Cholponbai ("Molodaya Gvardiya", 1958)
- Cholponbai ("Mektep", 1982)
- My Father's House (Dom moyego ottsa, 1963)
- Chui's Spills (Chuiskiye razlivy, 1968; OCLC 254078203)
- Three Islands (Tri ostrova, 1975)
- Homeland, I'll Be Back! (Rodina, ya vernus'!, 1975)

=== Short stories ===
- Where Rivers Meet (Gde slivayutsya reki, 1956)
- Bleeding Heart (Krov'yu serdtsa, 1968)
- Three Islands (Tri ostrova, 1975)
- The Boy and the Wolf (Mal'chik i volk, 1978)
- Eternal Snow (Netayushchiy sneg, 1989)

=== Collections of works ===
- Selected Works (Izbrannoe, 1978; OCLC 254083273)
- Novels and Short Stories (Povesti i rasskazy, 1988; ISBN 5-655-00113-6)

== Honours ==
- Medal "For the Defence of Stalingrad"
- Jubilee Medal "In Commemoration of the 100th Anniversary of the Birth of Vladimir Ilyich Lenin"
- Jubilee Medal "Twenty Years of Victory in the Great Patriotic War 1941–1945"
- Jubilee Medal "Thirty Years of Victory in the Great Patriotic War 1941–1945"
- Jubilee Medal "Forty Years of Victory in the Great Patriotic War 1941–1945"
- Jubilee Medal "50 Years of the Armed Forces of the USSR"
- Jubilee Medal "60 Years of the Armed Forces of the USSR"
- Three Ddiplomas of honor of the Presidium of the Supreme Soviet of the Kirghiz SSR.
