= Samokhin =

Samokhin (Russian: Самохин) is a Russian masculine surname, its feminine counterpart is Samokhina. It may refer to

- Andrey Samokhin (born 1985), Kazakhstani wrestler
- Anna Samokhina (1963–2010), Russian actress
- Daria Samokhina (born 1992), Russian handballer
- Gennady Samokhin (born 1971), Crimean speleologist
- Viktor Samokhin (1956–2022), Russian football player
- Fedor Samokhin (1918–1992), was a Soviet-Russian novelist, member of the Union of writers of the USSR.
