= Storozhevoye 1-ye =

Storozhevoye 1-ye Сторожевое 1-е
- Selo
- Location within Voronezh Oblast Location within Russia
- Coordinates: 51°12′N 39°10′E
- Country: Russia
- Region: Voronezh Oblast
- District: Ostrogozhsky District
- Time zone: UTC+3:00

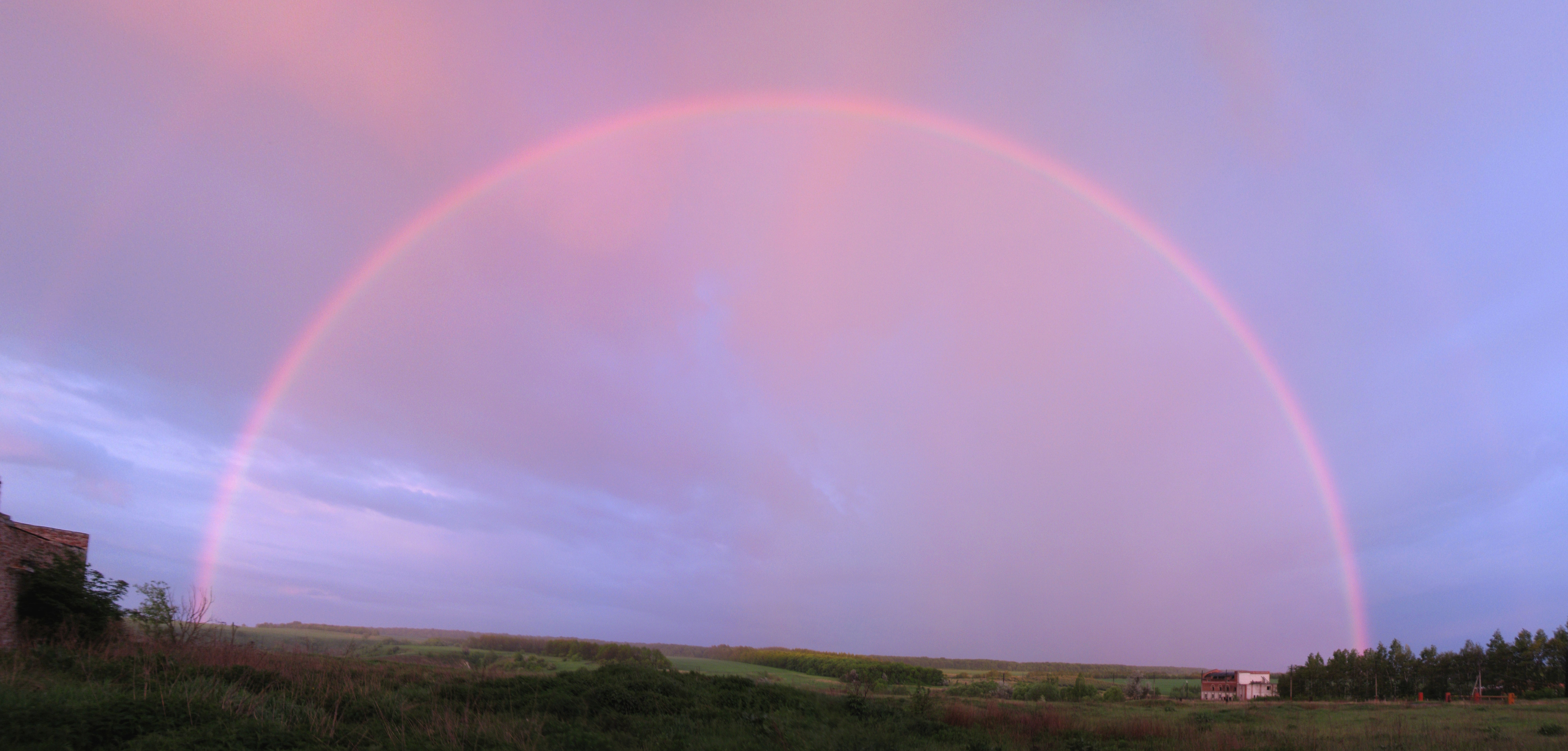

Storozhevoye 1-ye (Russian: Сторожевóе 1-е) is a rural locality (a selo) and the administrative center of Storozhevoye 1-ye Rural Settlement, Ostrogozhsky District, Voronezh Oblast, Russia. The population was 804 as of 2010. There are 9 streets.

== Geography ==
Storozhevoye 1-ye is located on the right bank of the Don River, 51 km north of Ostrogozhsk (the district's administrative centre) by road. Anoshkino is the nearest rural locality.
