= The Boy from Stalingrad (novel) =

1954 novel by Fedor Samokhin

- Author: Fedor Samokhin
- Original title: Мальчик из Сталинграда
- Language: Russian
- Genre: novel
- Publisher: Stalingrad Book Publishing House (1954)
- Publication date: 1954
- Publication place: Soviet Union
- Media type: Print (hard & paperback)

The Boy from Stalingrad (Russian: Мальчик из Сталинграда; Kyrgyz: Сталинграддык бала) is the first novel by Soviet writer Fedor Samokhin, published in 1954 by the Stalingrad Book Publishing House. It tells about the meeting in Kyrgyzstan and Kazakhstan of the evacuated population from the western regions of the country during the Eastern Front of World War II, and is devoted to the theme of friendship of nations. It was included in the list of "ideologically vicious" works and was severely criticized.

== Plot ==
The action takes place in 1942, at the beginning of the Battle of Stalingrad. Grisha Orlov, together with his mother, evacuated from Stalingrad to Kyrgyzstan (Grisha's elder brother Nikolai already lived and worked in the republic at that time); leaving his house at the Mosque beam, he saw "hundreds of fascist planes" in the sky near Stalingrad, which "were flying like flocks of huge bumblebees." All around, "the earth and the sky shook with the roar, houses collapsed, and smoke and dust stood in the air, blocking the sun, like a heavy gray cloud." Grisha and his mother barely crossed the Volga — "fascist planes dropped bombs on steamships and longboats". Then they found themselves outside the Urals, where "trains were running strictly according to schedule." On the way, my mother fell ill and soon died, my father died at the front. The woman who sheltered Grisha rummaged through all the mother's documents in search of a mention of where to look for Nikolai, but not finding him, she gave the boy to an orphanage. There he was met by his teacher Mariam and introduced him to other children; together with them Grisha took part in various activities — helped kolkhozes in collecting sugar beet, went to weeding a potato field. Going to the next task, Grisha was called to the office of the orphanage, where he was informed that Satkyn Asanova wanted to take him in. From that moment Grisha began to get acquainted with the culture and people of Kyrgyzstan; he lived in a yurt, drank tea with milk and ate tortillas, helped old Ibraimkul cultivate the soil, found himself riding a horse for the first time in his life, together with pioneers from the Embek school collected medicinal herbs for the front.

After a while, Grisha volunteered to help Ibraimkul bring knives for pruning beets and rode a horse named Berkutka to the village. However, the horse was scared by the children from the orphanage, and she rushed away from the road and broke her leg. The boy returned to the old man, and he scolded the boy: "What have you done? — gently touching the horse's leg, the old man said angrily. — How did you look?". Grisha began to explain what had happened, to which Ibraimkul replied to him: "You're lying! You're lying to me, the old man!". After a quarrel with the old man, Grisha ran away from the village back to the orphanage — but after the guys confessed to what they had done, Grisha returned to Satkyn and reconciled with Ibraimkul. It was the beginning of the school year and Grisha entered the local school in the fourth grade. Some time later, in the morning, his older brother Nikolai entered Grisha's room. Several years have passed; after graduating from the decade, Grisha went to study at the Stalingrad Mechanical Institute, and Nikolai works as a combine harvester at the Otradnoye state farm.

== Main characters ==
- Grisha Orlov was born in 1931, evacuated by train with his mother from Stalingrad to the Central Asia. On the way, some of the cars were uncoupled, and Grisha and his mother moved to the car going to the Soviet Kyrgyzstan. On the way, his mother fell ill — at the Belovodsk station, "she was already so bad" that she was taken off the train and put in the hospital; at that time, the boy was living with "some unknown kind woman cook" who worked in the hospital. A few days later, the mother died.
- Mariam is a teacher in an orphanage, she has a "dark smooth forehead, slightly tired eyes, slightly covered with eyelashes", her "black hair is braided in thick braids and laid around her head with a wreath".
- Akhtan is a friend of Grisha, his hair is the color of "ripe wheat", he himself is "thin, his neck is thin, and this makes the collar of a black shirt hang loose".
- Token is Grisha's second friend, brown-eyed, with a lively, swarthy and cheekboned face. He also had a stern and resolute face; "it was as if he was not twelve years old, but all twenty." He wore a black shirt with a stand-up collar and trousers, tanned to black. Despite the hot weather, he wore shoes. He dreams of getting to the front: "And I will visit the front. I will get to the front line, I will beat the fascists." On Grisha's offer to live together in Stalingrad instead of the front, Token refused: "And then what to do there?", "You can live in any city." He promised Grisha to find his brother: "And we will find our brother. We will definitely find it. Tomorrow we will tell Mary and go to the district executive committee, they will send a search team to all the edges".
- Satkyn Asanova — a young woman from the collective farm "Enbek" who sheltered Grisha, a link in the cultivation of sugar beet, later received the title of Hero of Socialist Labour. She was a widow: "Satkyn's husband died at the front in the summer".
- Ibraimkul is an old man and a kolkoznik, he was wearing a "quilted coat and a white felt hat." In his youth, he plucked hairs from his beard and mustache: "a poor Kyrgyz was not supposed to have such a luxury — after all, he had to buy a razor or a sharp knife to shave," and he did not have money then. Ibraimkul had a difficult youth: "Day and night he went after the Bay flock, and ate dry cakes and water". At the end of the story, he was dressed in a long black coat and "looked like a storyteller of beautiful legends of the gray Tien Shan".
- Nikolai Orlov is Grisha's older brother, worked as a combine harvester on a state farm, after being wounded near Rostov, he lived and worked in Kyrgyzstan. Brother Grisha "remembered very little." According to Grisha's memoirs, in peacetime, together with Nikolai, his father and mother, they went to the Volga on Sunday: "Taking a boat, they went to the Green Island and rested there all day". On the day of the meeting with Grisha, he was big and broad-shouldered, dressed in a gray soldier's overcoat, with a black patch over his left eye, "stood with his legs wide apart and smiled," he, like his mother, smiled quietly, as if ashamed of his smile. The boy noticed that he had "a slightly forked chin, just like his mother, wide brown eyebrows".

== Publication history and criticism ==
It tells about the meeting in Kyrgyzstan and Kazakhstan of the evacuated population from the western regions of the country during the Eastern Front of World War II, and is devoted to the theme of friendship of nations. In 1950, F. I. Samokhin received for her the first degree Prize of the literary competition organized by the Central Committee of the LKSM and the Union of Writers of Kyrgyzstan. In 1951, it was published in the 12th book of the almanac "Kyrgyzstan" (now the magazine "Literary Kyrgyzstan"). However, two years later, the story was included in the list of "ideologically vicious" works and subjected to harsh criticism. The writer was severely criticized in republican newspapers, calling this work not only artistically defective, but also "ideologically vicious." At a meeting convened by the Union of Writers of Kyrgyzstan, the Central Committee of the LKSM of Kyrgyzstan and the Ministry of Education of the Republic, Fyodor Samokhin admitted "made mistakes" and promised to "redo the story and not repeat mistakes in the future." The speaker Toktobolot Abdumomunov at the meeting stated that this book cannot be considered "satisfactory" in the sense of artistic usefulness: "Most authors continue to write non-objective, apolitical and unfinished works". The situation with the criticism of the story was covered in the American magazine "The Current Digest of the Soviet Press" from the American Association for the Development of Slavic Studies (AAASS). In 1968, the poet Nikolai Imshenetsky noted that the story was "warmly received by young readers", and that he was waiting for the continuation of the theme of the book in other works of the writer.

== Editions and publications in collections ==
Editions

- Samokhin, F (1954). Kimberg, V. A (ed.). The Boy from Stalingrad. Stalingrad: Stalingrad Book Publishing House. p. 82.

Publications in collections

- Samokhin, F (1951). "The boy from Stalingrad (novel)". Kyrgyzstan: Almanac (№12). Frunze: 50–78.
- Samokhin, F (1988). Gorbacheva, R. V (ed.). Povesti i rasskazy. Frunze: Publishing House "Kyrgyzstan". p. 200. ISBN 5-655-00113-6.
