= Homeland, I'll Be Back! =

Homeland, I'll be Back!
- Author: Fedor Samokhin
- Original title: Родина, я вернусь!
- Language: Russian
- Genre: novel
- Publisher: The Publishing House "Kyrgyzstan" (1975)
- Publication date: 1975
- Publication place: Soviet Union
- Media type: Print (hardback)

Homeland, I'll be Back! (Russian: Родина, я вернусь!; Kyrgyz: Мекеним, мен кайрылып келем!) is a novel for children and young adults by Fedor Samokhin, published in 1975 by the publishing house "Kyrgyzstan".

== Plot ==
Esen Osmonov and Mikola Danilchenko, along with other children, are kidnapped by the Nazis and transported to Germany. From that moment on, they become pupils of the railway school in Moritzburg, where strict rules prevail. The true purpose of the school is to educate future agents loyal to the Reich and the Fuhrer.

Trying to return to their homeland, the young men face difficulties. The approach of Soviet troops to the German border becomes the reason for the transfer of pupils to the British. When Esen gets hope of salvation after meeting with representatives of the KGB, the main character is kidnapped again and transported to London. Now his main task is to bypass the agents from the MI6, and find the Soviet embassy, in which he is assisted by Londoners and Soviet agents.

== Protagonists ==
- Esen Osmonov: was born in 1930 in the village of Balyk in the Ulakhol district of Kyrgyzstan, in the family of a border guard commander and a schoolteacher. Having lost his parents, he is captured by the Nazis and transported to Germany. He has a high forehead, expressive eyes, thick and coarse hair, speaks Russian poorly, but easily learns German. He loves poetry and sometimes composes his own.
- Mikola Danilchenko: was born in 1929, originally from Kiev from Khreshchatyk. The "broad-shouldered boy" came to the outpost to his brother, the senior lieutenant - later the Nazis took him and Esen to the station. He is energetic by nature, helps the weak and when he worries, he begins to speak Ukrainian.
- Hans Koch: is a twenty-three-year-old "dapper" non-commissioned officer, a graduate of Vilnius University, and a former high school German teacher. He was born in Lithuania in a family of workers. He has a thin, pale face and rough palms, his appearance suggests that "this man ate poorly, but worked hard physically." When the Soviet Union occupied Lithuania, Hans and his friends decided to go abroad. Due to lack of money to move, he and his friends rob a jewelry store, for which Hans was sentenced to three years jail, but was soon released from prison by the German authorities. Hans is now the company commander of the Muritzburg Railway School and the personal translator of the commandant of the railway school Otto von Kruger.
- Ruth Lemke: is an old friend of Hans Koch. She is German, speaks Russian with almost no accent. She is tall, has blond curled hair, gray eyes and dark eyebrows. She works for Soviet intelligence.

== Publication and significance ==
The novel was published in 1975 by the publishing house "Kyrgyzstan", then it was included in the one-volume collection of the writer's works "Izbrannoe" (1978; OCLC 254083273). In 1976, literary critic and the former President of the Kyrgyzstan Writers Union Tendik Askarov attributed the novel to "definitely successful" works that contributed to the development of front-line themes in Kyrgyz literature. In 1981, the magazine Literary Kyrgyzstan singled out the novel from among the works written for children and youth, noting the "dramatic" image by the author the struggle of the Soviet Union for the return of children left in Nazi-occupied territories.
