= Uryv-Pokrovka =

Uryv-Pokrovka Урыв-Покровка
- Selo
- Location within Voronezh Oblast Location within Russia
- Coordinates: 51°06′N 39°10′E
- Country: Russia
- Region: Voronezh Oblast
- District: Ostrogozhsky District
- Time zone: UTC+3:00

Uryv-Pokrovka (Russian: Урыв-Покровка) is a rural locality (a selo) and the administrative center of Uryvskoye Rural Settlement, Ostrogozhsky District, Voronezh Oblast, Russia. The population was 1,647 as of 2010. There are 13 streets.

== Geography ==
Uryv-Pokrovka is located 46 km north of Ostrogozhsk (the district's administrative centre) by road. Devitsa is the nearest rural locality.
