= Ekspress-K =

- Founded: 12 January 1992
- Language: Russian
- Website: link

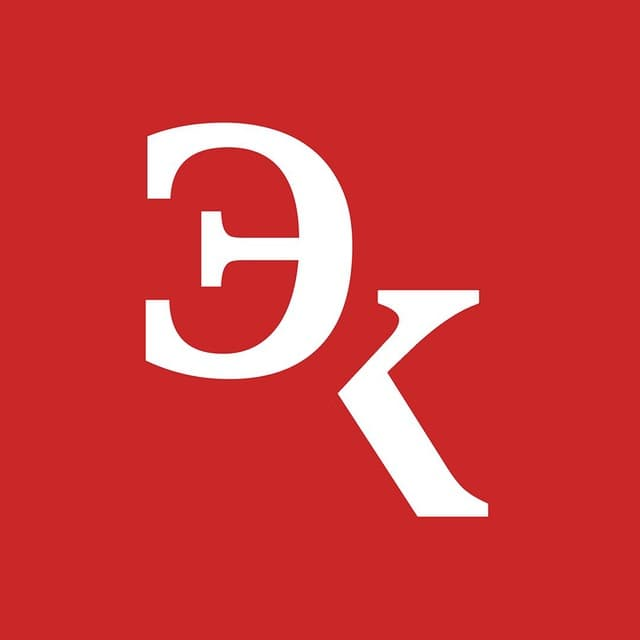
Logo of Ekspress-K

Ekspress-K (Russian: Экспресс К) is a private Russian language newspaper published in Kazakhstan. The first issue appeared on 12 January 1992.

== See also ==
- Media of Kazakhstan
