= Novozadonsky =

Novozadonsky Новозадонский
- Khutor
- Location within Voronezh Oblast Location within Russia
- Coordinates: 51°07′N 39°19′E
- Country: Russia
- Region: Voronezh Oblast
- District: Liskinsky District
- Time zone: UTC+3:00

Novozadonsky (Russian: Новозадонский) is a rural locality (a khutor) in Bodeyevskoye Rural Settlement, Liskinsky District, Voronezh Oblast, Russia. The population was 205 as of 2010. There are 3 streets.

== Geography ==
Novozadonsky is located 31 km northwest of Liski (the district's administrative centre) by road. Bodeyevka is the nearest rural locality.
