= Oskino =

Oskino Оськино
- Selo
- Location within Voronezh Oblast Location within Russia
- Coordinates: 51°14′N 39°01′E
- Country: Russia
- Region: Voronezh Oblast
- District: Khokholsky District
- Time zone: UTC+3:00

Oskino (Russian: Оськино) is a rural locality (a selo) and the administrative center of Oskinskoye Rural Settlement, Khokholsky District, Voronezh Oblast, Russia. The population was 709 as of 2010. There are 19 streets.

== Geography ==
Oskino is located 56 km southeast of Khokholsky (the district's administrative centre) by road. Rossoshki is the nearest rural locality.
