= Shukurbek Beyshenaliev =

Soviet writer (1928–2000)

Shukurbek Beyshenaliev (Cyrillic: Бейшеналиев Шүкүрбек) (25 October 1928 – 2000) was a Soviet writer of Kyrgyz origin. He wrote numerous stories about the lives of his fellow Kyrgyz people. One of his best-known works is The Horned Lamb (Рогатый ягненок), an award-winning children's book that was translated into English and Bengali, among other languages.
