= Ostrogozhsky District =

Ostrogozhsky District Острогожский район (Russian)
- District
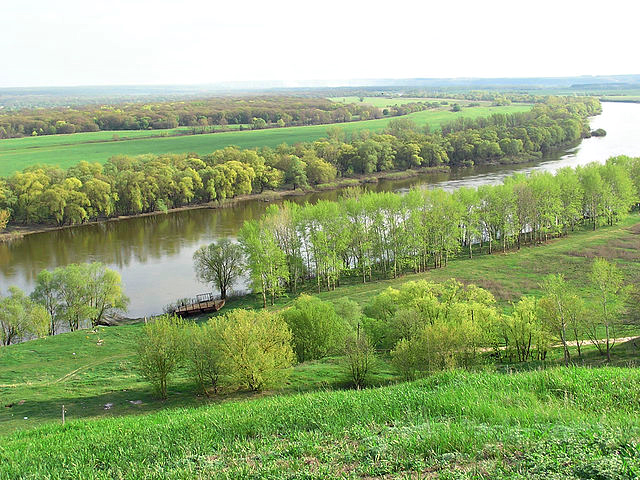
- The Don River near the selo of Uryv-Pokrovka in Ostrogozhsky District

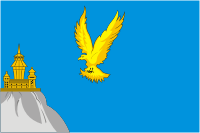
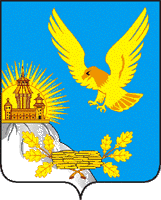
- Flag Coat of arms
- Location of Ostrogozhsky District in Voronezh Oblast
- Coordinates: 50°52′N 39°05′E
- Country: Russia
- Federal subject: Voronezh Oblast
- Established: 1928
- Administrative center: Ostrogozhsk

Area
  - Total: 1,725 km^{2} (666 sq mi)

Population (2010 Census)
  - Total: 61,291
  - Density: 35.53/km^{2} (92.02/sq mi)
  - Urban: 55.2%
  - Rural: 44.8%

Administrative structure
  - Administrative divisions: 1 Urban settlements, 19 Rural settlements
  - Inhabited localities: 1 cities/towns, 79 rural localities

Municipal structure
  - Municipally incorporated as: Ostrogozhsky Municipal District
  - Municipal divisions: 1 urban settlements, 19 rural settlements
- Time zone: UTC+3 (MSK)
- OKTMO ID: 20631000
- Website: http://www.ostroadm.ru/

Ostrogozhsky District (Russian: Острого́жский райо́н) is an administrative and municipal district (raion), one of the thirty-two in Voronezh Oblast, Russia. It is located in the west of the oblast. The area of the district is 1,725 square kilometers (666 sq mi). Its administrative center is the town of Ostrogozhsk. Population: 55,747 (2021 census); 61,291 (2010 census); 27,972 (2002 census); 31,201 (1989 Soviet census). The population of Ostrogozhsk accounts for 58.3% of the district's total population.

== People ==
- Ivan Kramskoi (1837–1887)
