= Ostrogozhsk =

Town in Voronezh Oblast, Russia

Ostrogozhsk Острогожск
- Town
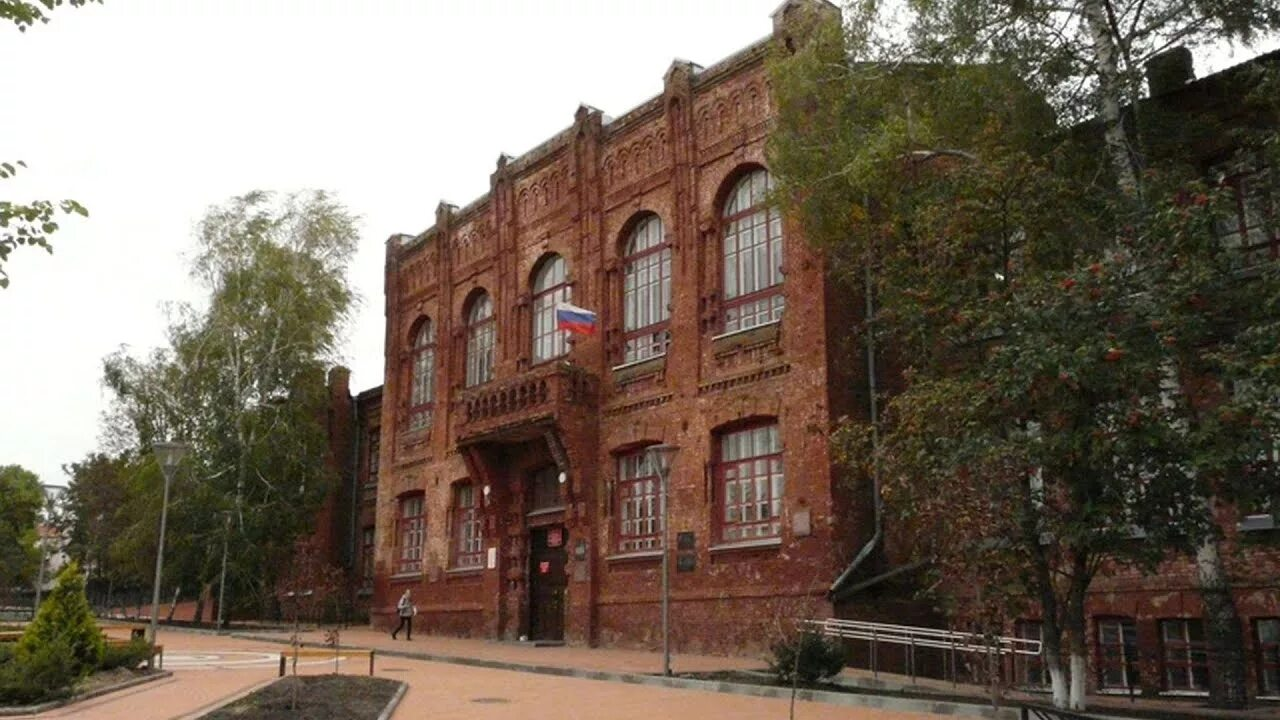
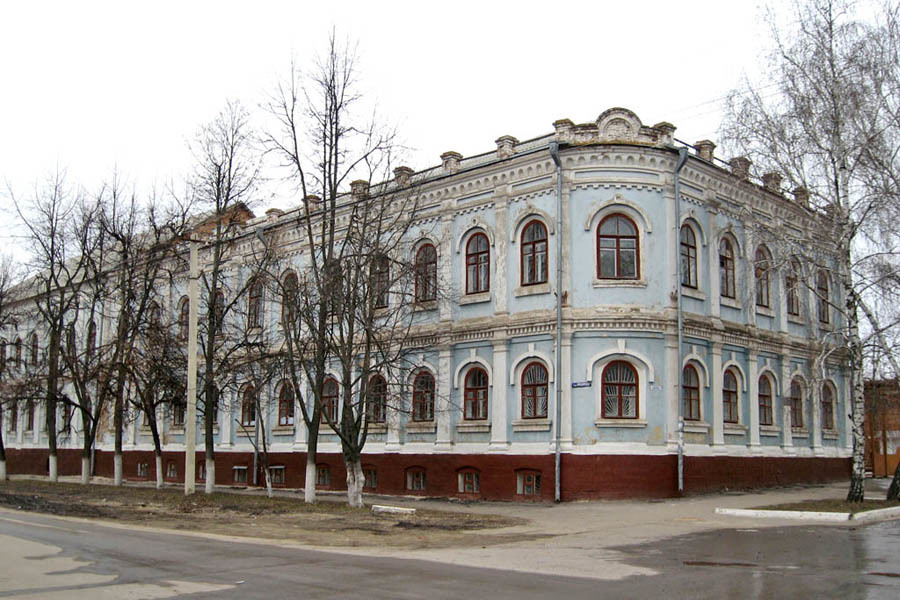
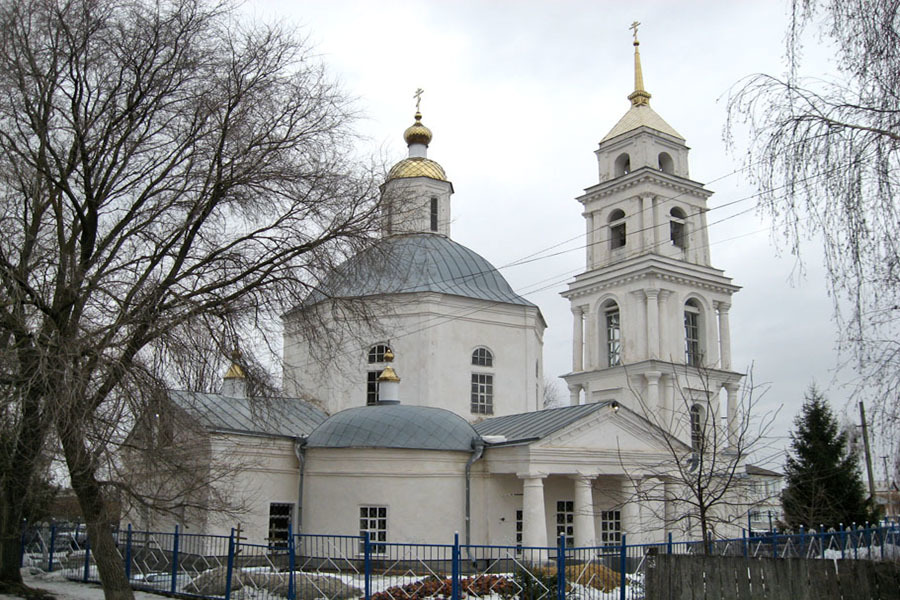
- Clockwise from top: School No. 2 • Church of the Transfiguration of the Lord • Ostrogozhsk Medical College

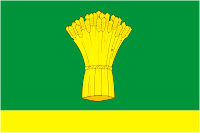
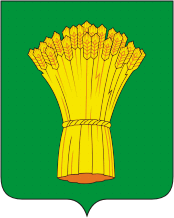
- Flag Coat of arms
- Interactive map of Ostrogozhsk
- Location of Ostrogozhsk Ostrogozhsk (European Russia) Ostrogozhsk (Russia)
- Coordinates: 50°52′N 39°04′E
- Country: Russia
- Federal subject: Voronezh Oblast
- Administrative district: Ostrogozhsky District
- Urban settlementSelsoviet: Ostrogozhsk
- Founded: 1652
- Town status since: 1765
- Elevation: 110 m (360 ft)

Population (2010 Census)
  - Total: 33,842
  - Estimate (2025): 30,549 (−9.7%)

Administrative status
  - Capital of: Ostrogozhsky District, Ostrogozhsk Urban Settlement

Municipal status
  - Municipal district: Ostrogozhsky Municipal District
  - Urban settlement: Ostrogozhsk Urban Settlement
  - Capital of: Ostrogozhsky Municipal District, Ostrogozhsk Urban Settlement
- Time zone: UTC+3 (MSK)
- Postal codes: 397850, 397852–397855
- Dialing code: +7 47375
- OKTMO ID: 20631101001

Ostrogozhsk population
- 2021 Census: 32,520
- 2010 Census: 33,842
- 2002 Census: 34,585
- 1989 Census: 34,492
- 1979 Census: 34,044

Ostrogozhsk (Russian: Острого́жск) is a town and the administrative center of Ostrogozhsky District in Voronezh Oblast, Russia, located on the Tikhaya Sosna River (a tributary of the Don), 142 kilometers (88 mi) south of Voronezh, the administrative center of the oblast. As of the 2021 Census, its population was 32,520.

== History ==
Ostrogozhsk is a historical center of Eastern Sloboda Ukraine. It was established in 1652 by Belgorod Voivode Fedor Arsenyev and Cossack Ivan Zevkovsky (or Dzenkovsky) as Ostrogozhsk (little fortress) bringing along some 2,000 resettlers from Chernigov and Nezhin Regiments around an ostrog (fortress) of the Belgorod Defensive Line of Russia.

During the time of Stepan Razin's revolt against Aleksey Mikhailovich of Russia the city was under control of rebellious Cossacks.

In 1696 Peter the Great stopped at Ostrogozhsk to meet with the Hetman of Zaporizhian Host Ivan Mazepa and Cossacks of Ostrogozhsk regiment. At the Ostrogozhsk city square is located a memorial commemorating the event.

In 1708 Ostrogozhsk was incorporated into the Azov Governorate.

In 1724 the Russians that were living in Ostrogozhsk, who were referred to as "people of posad" by the local inhabitants moved to Korotoyak and the Ukrainian Cossacks that lived in Korotoyak moved to Ostrogozhsk.

The town served as the headquarters of a Sloboda Ukrainian Cossack territorial and military regiment until the 1760s when it was abolished by Catherine II. In 1765 the city Ostrogozhsk was incorporated into newly established the Sloboda Ukraine Governorate. In 1802 the city of Ostrogozhsk ended up in the new Voronezh Governorate and same year it was granted the town rights. Since then the city became a center of the split East Sloboda Ukraine.

According to the 1897 Russian census there were 51,4% of Little Russians (Ukrainians) in the town of Ostrogozhsk and 46,8% of Great Russians (Russians). The inhabitants of the town continued to preserve their Ukrainian customs and Cossack traditions well into the twentieth century and their remains a district of the town named 'majdan'.

In 1918 the town was controlled by Ukrainian People's Republic and the Ukrainian Hetmanate. From 1919 the town was controlled by Anton Denikin's White Armee of South Russia. In 1920, Ostrogozhsk became a part of Soviet Russia, while borders between the Soviet Russia and the Soviet Ukraine were not finalized until 1925. According to the census of 1926, ethnic Ukrainians accounted for 74.1 percent of the town's and 69.6 percent of the county's inhabitants. In 1928 Ostrogozhsk became a district's administrative center within what now is Voronezh Oblast. The town was occupied by Nazi Germany during World War II from July 5, 1942 (during the Battle of Voronezh) to January 20, 1943, when it was liberated in the course of the Ostrogozhsk–Rossosh Offensive. The Germans operated a forced labour battalion for Jews in the town.

== Administrative and municipal status ==
Within the framework of administrative divisions, Ostrogozhsk serves as the administrative center of Ostrogozhsky District. As an administrative division, it is, together with six rural localities in Ostrogozhsky District, incorporated within Ostrogozhsky District as Ostrogozhsk Urban Settlement. As a municipal division, this administrative unit also has urban settlement status and is a part of Ostrogozhsky Municipal District.

== Notable people ==
- Alexander Iovsky (1796—1857), Russian chemist and pharmacist
- Ivan Kramskoi (1837—1887), Russian painter
- Lev Solovyev (1837—1919), Russian painter
- Elisabeth Milicyna (1869—1930), Russian writer
- Eduard Steinberg (1882—1935), Russian painter
- Pavel Fedoseenko (1898—1934), Soviet aeronaut
- Olga Vasilyeva, Soviet Russian sniper
- Veniamin Gaydukov, Soviet Russian lieutenant-general
